= Gyeongui Line (1904–1945) =

1904–1945 railway line in Korea

Overview
- Native name: 경의선 (京義線)
- Status: Divided
- Owner: Temporary Military Railway (1905–1906); National Railway (1906–1909); Korea Railway (1909–1910); Chosen Government Railway (1910–1917); South Manchuria Railway (1917–1925); Chosen Government Railway (1925–1945)
- Termini: Gyeongseong; Sinuiju

Service
- Type: Heavy rail, Passenger rail, Freight rail

History
- Opened: 3 April 1906
- Closed: 1945 (divided)

Technical
- Line length: 499.3 km (310.3 mi)
- Number of tracks: Double track
- Track gauge: 1,435 mm (4 ft 8 1/2 in) standard gauge

- Gyeongui Line
- Hangul: 경의선
- Hanja: 京義線
- RR: Gyeonguiseon
- MR: Kyŏngŭisŏn

The Gyeongui Line (Korean: 경의선, Japanese: 京義線) was a railway line of the Chosen Government Railway running from Keijō to Sinuiju in Korea, Empire of Japan. After the partition of Korea in 1945, the line was divided between North and South Korea.

== History ==
=== Origins, to 1910 ===
Construction of a railway line running north from Hanseong had been envisioned since the end of the 19th century, but the lack of funding led to the failure of several attempts. Over the last five years of the century several abortive attempts were made to that end. In 1896 the French Fives Lille obtained the rights to build a railway line in Korea, but after failing to secure the necessary funding, the rights were transferred to the "Korean Railway Company" (대한철도회사, Hanguk Cheoldohoesa) in 1899. However, this attempt likewise went nowhere. Finally, in 1900, the government-owned "Western Railway" (서부철도회사, Seobu Cheoldohoesa) began surveying a route for a railway from Gyeongseong to Gaeseong. Construction of what was to become the first section of the Gyeongui Line began in 1902. The line's name was derived from the names of the two proposed termini, Gyeongseong and Sinuiju.

Imperial Japan, which had gained the concession to build the Gyeongbu Line from Seoul to Busan, recognised that a railway running through all of Korea from north to south would serve as a means to strengthen its influence over Korea, sought to gain control of the Gyeongui Line project as well. When the Russo-Japanese War broke out in 1904, Japan ignored Korea's declaration of neutrality, transporting troops to Incheon and forcing the Korean government to sign an agreement that gave Japan's military control of railway projects if deemed necessary for military operations. The Imperial Japanese Army then established the Temporary Military Railway Office, and took over control of the Western Railway, intending to use the line to assist with military operations against Russia in Manchuria. The Yongsan–Gaeseong section was completed in March 1904, followed by the completion of the Pyeongyang–Sinuiju (today's Kangan station) section on 28 April 1905, and freight operations between Yongsan and Sinuiju began on 5 November of that year. Although the war had ended on 5 September of that year, the Japanese military retained control of the Temporary Military Railway, still intent on using it to ensure its dominance in Korea. In the following year, bridges were completed over the Cheongcheon and Daedong rivers, allowing for the operation of through trains between Yongsan and Sinŭiju. The Gyeongui Line was officially opened on 3 April 1906.

Twelve days after freight operations began on the Gyeongui Line, the Second Japan–Korea Convention was signed, making the Empire of Korea a protectorate of the Empire of Japan, with the Japanese Resident-General representing Japan in Korea. The Administration of the Resident-General established its Railway Office on 1 July 1906, at the same time nationalising the privately owned (by Japanese interests) Gyeongbu Railway, which by then was the only other railway operator in Korea besides the Temporary Military Railway. On 1 September of that year, the Railway Office took over control of the Gyeongui Line from the military and merged it with the Gyeongbu Railway to create the National Railway Administration.

The National Railway initiated passenger service on the Gyeongui Line on 1 April 1908, and Korea's first express train, the "Ryūki", began operating between Sinuiju and Busan via Gyeongseong. The National Railway was reformed on 18 June 1909, being replaced by the newly established Korea Railway. When Korea was annexed by Japan on 29 August 1910, the creation of the Government-General of Korea led to the establishment of the Railway Bureau of the Government-General of Korea, with the Railway Bureau taking over administration of the Korea Railway and renaming it the Chosen Government Railway (Sentetsu).

=== Japanese rule, 1910–1945 ===
On 1 November 1911, Korea's first railway connection to another country was made, when the Yalu River Railway Bridge was completed across the Yalu River between Sinuiju and Andong, connecting the Gyeongui Line to the Anfeng Line of the South Manchuria Railway (Mantetsu). Work to convert the Anfeng Line from 762 mm (2 ft 6.0 in) narrow gauge to standard gauge was completed at the same time, thus connecting the capitals of Korea and China via Manchuria with a continuous railway line. As a result, Sentetsu opened a new station in Sinuiju, with the original station, located 1.8 km (1.1 mi) northwest of the new station, being renamed Lower Sinuiju station, which on 1 June 1936 was renamed Sinuiju Gangan station, and the 1.8 km (1.1 mi) line from Sinuiju station to Sinuiju Kangan station was detached from the Gyeongui Line to become the Gangan Line. Passenger service on the Gangan Line was discontinued on 31 March 1943, with general (public) freight traffic being relocated from Sinuiju Gangan to Sinuiju station on 20 December of that year.

Over the following decades, numerous branch lines and privately owned railways were built connecting to the Gyeongui Line mainline. On 13 May 1916, the Mitsui Mining Railway (called Gaecheon Light Railway after 1927) opened the narrow gauge Gaecheon Line from Sinanju to Gaecheon, Sentetsu opened the Bakcheon Line from Maengjungni to Bakcheon on 10 December 1926, on 27 September 1939 the Pyeongbuk Railway opened its line from Jeongju to Cheongsu and Supung, where the Supung Dam was built; the Emperor of Manchukuo, Puyi, visited the Supung Dam, travelling by rail via the Gyeongui Line and the Pyeongbuk Railway. On 31 October 1939 the Dasado Railway opened its Sinuiju–South Sinuiju Interlocking–Yangsi–Dasado Port line, and on 29 October 1940, extended it from Yangsi south to Namsi, connecting it to the Gyeongui Line there, too. This resulted in a shorter route than the original mainline between South Sinuiju and Namsi, leading Sentetsu to nationalise the Sinuiju—Namsi line on 1 April 1943, naming it the Yangsi Line. South Sinuiju Interlocking was elevated to station status on 16 October 1943.

Between 1917 and 1925, the management of Sentetsu was transferred to the South Manchuria Railway, during this time, Sentetsu was referred to as "Mantetsu Gyeongseong Bureau"; however, on 1 April 1925 management of railways in Korea was returned to the Railway Bureau, and Sentetsu became independent once again. Passenger service was expanded in the 1930s, seeing the introduction of the "Hikari" limited express running from Busan to Xinjing, Manchukuo, in November 1934; then, in November 1939, the North China Transportation Company, in conjunction with Sentetsu and Mantetsu, introduced the "Koa" and "Tairiku" limited express trains, running between Pusan and Beijing. The "Koa" made the trip in 39 hours 30 minutes in 1940, but as the situation deteriorated due to the Pacific War, travel times increased, taking 49 hours by January 1945. The train remained in operation until Japan's defeat. By 1943 traffic levels were sufficiently high to justify double tracking of the entire line between P'yŏngyang and Sinŭiju, with the work being completed on 15 May 1943.

Following Japan's defeat in the Pacific War and the subsequent partition of Korea, the Gyeongui Line was divided at the 38th parallel between North and South Korea. On 25 August 1945, the Soviet Army began operating trains on the line north of Sariwon, whilst trains in the south terminated at Gaeseong. In 1946, the railways in both North and South were nationalised, creating the Korean National Railroad in the South and the Korean State Railway in the North. After the Korean War, the Gyeongui Line was split into three sections. In the South, the Seoul–Jangdan section became the KNR's Gyeongui Line, retaining the same name; in the North, the Bongdong–Pyeongyang section became the P'yŏngbu Line, whilst the Pyeongyang–Sinuiju section became the P'yŏngŭi Line.

For the post-war history of the various sections of Sentetsu's Gyeongui Line, see Gyeongui Line for the Southern section, and P'yŏngbu Line, P'yŏngŭi Line, Yangsi Line, and Paengma Line for the sections in the North.

== Route ==
Stations as of 1945
Distance		Station name					
Total; km	S2S; km	Transcribed, Korean	Transcribed, Japanese	Hunminjeongeum	Hanja/Kanji	Opening date	Connections
0.0	0.0	Gyeongseong	Keijō	경성	京城	8 July 1900	Gyeongbu Line, Gyeongwon Line
3.1	3.1	Sinchon	Shinson	신촌	新村	11 July 1921	
5.8	2.7	Gajwa	Kasa	가좌	加佐	1 December 1930	
8.5	2.7	Susaek	Suishoku	수색	水色	1 April 1908	
16.5	8.0	Neunggok	Ryōkoku	능곡	陵谷	1 April 1908	
24.9	8.4	Ilsan	Issan	일산	一山	3 April 1906	
35.1	10.2	Geumchon	Kinson	금촌	金村	4 April 1906	
46.0	10.9	Munsan	Bunzan	문산	汶山	3 April 1906	
57.8	11.8	Jangdan	Chōtan	장단	長湍	3 April 1906	
65.6	7.8	Bongdong	Hōtō	봉동	鳳東	3 April 1906	
73.4	7.8	Gaeseong	Kaijō	개성	開城	1 April 1908	
82.5	9.1	Toseong	Dojō	토성	土城	4 April 1906	Dohae Line
90.3	7.8	Yeohyeon	Reiken	여현	礪峴	1 July 1923	
97.5	7.2	Gyejeong	Keisei	계정	鶏井	3 April 1906	
109.4	11.9	Geumgyo	Kinkō	금교	金郊	3 April 1906	
119.7	10.3	Hanpo	Kanpo	한포	汗浦	3 April 1906	
125.4	5.7	Pyeongsan	Heizan	평산	平山	20 December 1931	
134.0	8.6	Namcheon	Nansen	남천	南川	20 December 1931	
142.8	8.8	Mulgae	Bukkai	물개	物開	?	
153.3	10.5	Sinmak	Shinbaku	신막	新幕	3 April 1906	
160.1	6.8	Seoheung	Zuikō	서흥	瑞興	3 April 1906	
170.5	10.4	Munmuri	Bunburi	문무리	文武里	1 December 1939	
175.3	4.8	Heungsu	Kōsui	흥수	興水	4 April 1906	
183.2	7.9	Cheonggye	Seikei	청계	清溪	4 April 1906	
190.2	7.0	Madong	Badō	마동	馬洞	4 April 1906	
195.6	5.4	Sinbongsan	Shinpōzan	신봉산	新鳳山	1 December 1926	
200.2	4.6	Sariwon	Shariin	사리원	沙里院	4 April 1906	Hwanghae Main Line, Jangyeon Line
206.9	6.7	Gyedong	Keitō	계동	桂東	1 July 1923	
214.0	7.1	Chimchon	Chinson	침촌	沈村	4 April 1906	
224.2	10.2	Hwanghae Hwangju	Hōkai-Kōshū	황해황주	黃海黃州	5 November 1905	Gyeom-ipo Line
236.3	12.1	Heukgyo	Kokkyō	흑교	黒橋	4 April 1906	
242.9	6.6	Junghwa	Chūwa	중화	中和	4 April 1906	
250.2	7.3	Yeokpo	Ryokuho	역포	力浦	4 April 1906	
258.1	7.9	Daedonggang	Daidōkō	대동강	大同江	1 October 1926	Pyeongyang Colliery Line
260.7	2.6	Pyeongyang	Heijō	평양	平壤	3 April 1906	Pyeongnam Line
265.4	4.7	West Pyongyang	Nishi-Heijō	서평양	西平壤	16 November 1929	
271.8	6.4	Seopo	Seiho	서포	西浦	1 April 1908	Pyeongwon Line
279.9	8.1	Galli	Kanri	간리	間里	11 February 1934	
285.9	6.0	Sunan	Jun'an	순안	順安	?	
294.2	8.3	Seokam	Sekigan	석암	石巌	1 July 1923	
301.8	7.6	Eopa	Gyoha	어파	漁波	5 November 1905	
312.6	10.8	Sukcheon	Shukusen	숙천	粛川	5 November 1905	
322.9	10.3	Manseong	Banjō	만성	万城	5 November 1905	
331.2	8.3	Daegyo	Taikyō	대교	大橋	16 July 1938	
336.4	5.2	Sinanju	Shin'anshū	신안주	新安州	5 November 1905	Gaecheon Line
342.4	6.0	Maengjungni	Mōchūri	맹중리	孟中里	1 October 1914	Bakcheon Line
349.8	7.4	Yeongmi	Reibi	영미	嶺美	?	
362.8	13.0	Unjeon	Unden	운전	雲田	?	
371.3	8.5	Goeup	Koyū	고읍	古邑	?	
384.1	12.8	Jeongju	Teishū	정주	定州	5 November 1905	Pyeongbuk Railway Pyeongbuk Line
388.8	4.7	Hadan	Katan	하단	下端	16 July 1938	
396.7	7.9	Gwaksan	Kakuzan	곽산	郭山	5 November 1905	
408.3	11.6	Noha	Roka	노하	路下	?	
417.6	9.3	Seoncheon	Sensen	선천	宣川	5 November 1905	
427.7	10.1	Dongnim	Tōrin	동림	東林	5 November 1905	
438.5	10.8	Charyeonggwan	Sharenkan	차련관	車輦館	5 November 1905	Dongcheon Line
451.9	13.4	Namsi	Nanshi	남시	南市	5 November 1905	Dasado Railway Yangsi Line
460.6	8.7	Yangchaek	Ryōsaku	양책	良策	5 November 1905	
468.4	7.8	Pihyeon	Hiken	피현	枇峴	5 November 1905	
477.7	9.3	Baengma	Hakuba	백마	白馬	5 November 1905	
488.9	11.2	Seokha	Sekka	석하	石下	5 November 1905	
491.5	2.6	Namsinuiju	Minami-Shingishū	남신의주	南新義州	1 October 1938	Sentetsu Yangsi Line
496.7	5.2	Sinuiju	Shingishū	신의주	新義州	1911	Gang-an Line
		Yalu River Railway Bridge	Ōryokukō-tekkyō	압록강 철교	鴨綠江鐵橋	October 1911	Korea, Empire of Japan−Manchukuo border
499.3	2.6	Andong, Manchukuo	Antō	안동	安东	11 November 1911 (regauged)	South Manchuria Railway Anfeng Line
