= Ragwon station (Pyongui Line) =

Railway station in North Korea

Ragwŏn 락원

Korean name
- Hangul: 락원역
- Hanja: 樂元驛
- Revised Romanization: Nagwon-yeok
- McCune–Reischauer: Ragwŏn-yŏk

General information
- Location: Ragwŏn 1-dong, Sinŭiju, North P'yŏngan Province; North Korea
- Coordinates: 40°02′37″N 124°26′05″E
- Owner: Korean State Railway

Services
Preceding station	Korean State Railway	Following station
South Sinŭiju towards Dandong (China)	P'yŏngŭi Line	Ryongch'ŏn towards P'yŏngyang
Location

Ragwŏn station (Pohyang station) is a railway station in Ragwŏn 1-dong, Sinŭiju, North P'yŏngan Province, North Korea. It is on located on the P'yŏngŭi Line of the Korean State Railway.
