= Sinŭiju Chongnyon station =

Railway station in North Korea

Coordinates: 40°06′25″N 124°24′06″E

Sinŭiju Ch'ŏngnyŏn 신의주청년
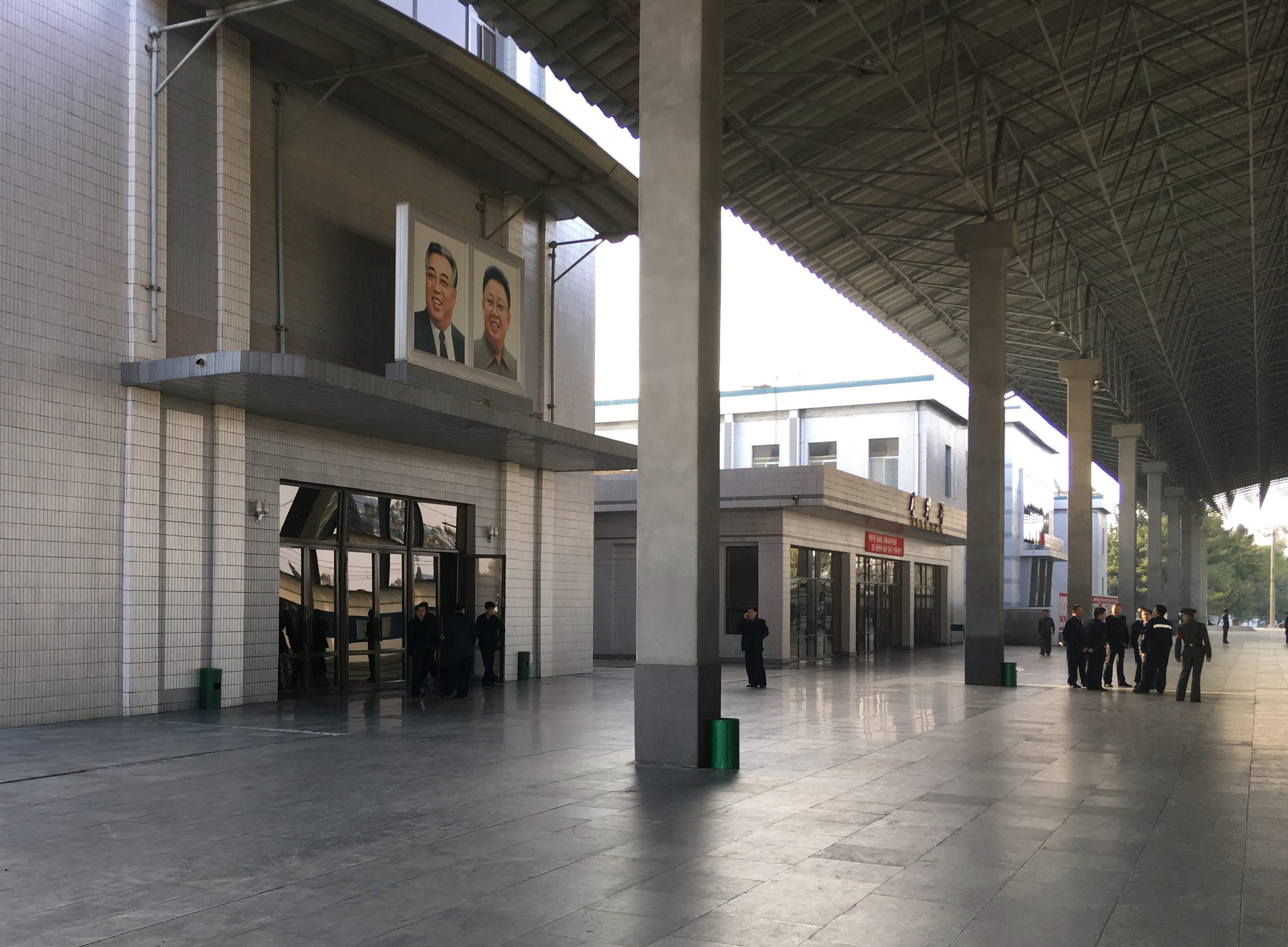
- View of Sinŭiju Ch'ŏngnyŏn station of the platform area

Korean name
- Hangul: 신의주청년역
- Hanja: 新義州青年驛
- RR: Sinuiju cheongnyeon-yeok
- MR: Sinŭiju ch'ŏngnyŏn-yŏk

General information
- Location: Yŏkchŏn-dong, Sinŭiju-si, North P'yŏngan; North Korea
- Owner: Korean State Railway
- Platforms: 5 (2 island platforms)
- Tracks: 14

History
- Opened: 1911
- Rebuilt: 1954

Services
| Preceding station | Korean State Railway | Following station |
|---|---|---|
| Dandong (China) Terminus | P'yŏngŭi Line | South Sinŭiju towards P'yŏngyang |
| Terminus | Kangan Line | Kangan Terminus |

Sinŭiju Chongnyon station, also known as Sinŭiju Ch'ŏngnyŏn station, is a railway station in Yŏkchŏn-dong, Sinŭiju-si, North P'yŏngan Province, North Korea. It is the northern terminus of the P'yŏngŭi Line of the Korean State Railway, and the starting point of the Kang'an Line, which is an industrial line serving the factories of Sinŭiju.

The station is the main recipient of overland traffic between North Korea and the People's Republic of China, and is one of the country's most important rail stations, as it controls access to the Chinese city of Dandong over the Yalu River, via the Sino-Korean Friendship Bridge. Adjacent to the station is a locomotive maintenance depot.

== History ==
The Kyŏngŭi Line was opened on 3 April 1906, and general passenger and freight service began on 1 April 1908. The original station was located at what is now Kang'an station, 1.8 km (1.1 mi) to the northwest of the current Sinŭiju Ch'ŏngnyŏn station, but, following the opening of the Yalu River Bridge connecting the Kyŏngŭi Line to the South Manchuria Railway's Shendan (Anpo) Line, the Chosen Government Railway opened a new station at the current site.

The old station was then renamed Lower Sinŭiju station. On 1 June 1936, Lower Sinŭiju station was renamed Sinŭiju Kang'an station, and the 1.8 km (1.1 mi) line from Sinŭiju station to Sinŭiju Kang'an station was detached from the Kyŏngŭi Line to become the Kang'an Line. Passenger service on the Kang'an Line was discontinued on 31 March 1943, with general (public) freight traffic being relocated from Sinŭiju Kang'an to Sinŭiju station on 20 December of that year.

The original three-story European style building was destroyed by UN forces in the Korean War, and the station was rebuilt after the war; it received the current name at the same time, in honour of the Youth Shock Troops who took part in the reconstruction of the station.

== Gallery ==
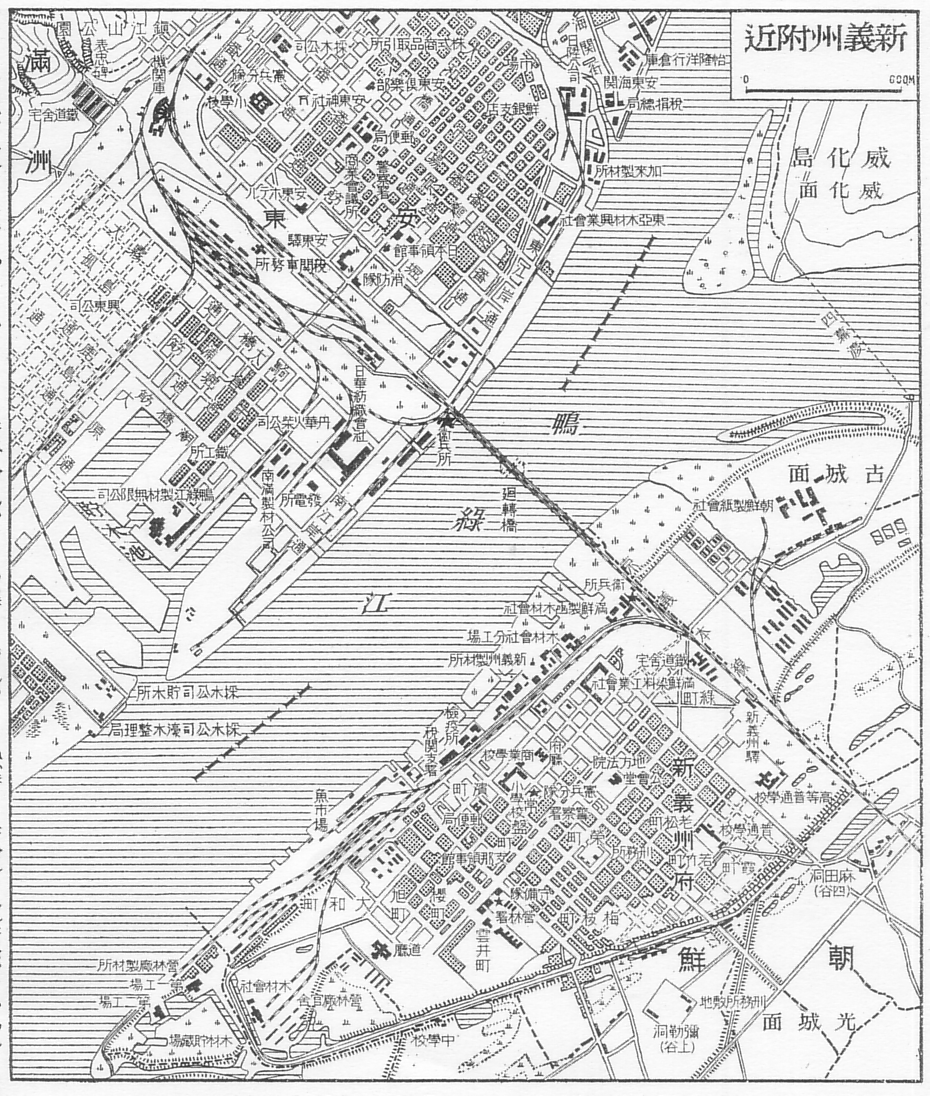
Map of Andong (Dandong) and Sinŭiju, c. 1930

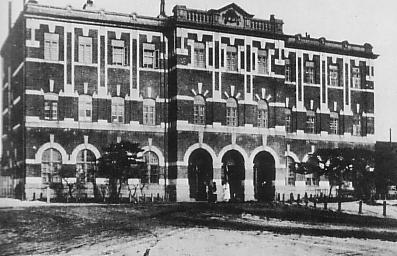
Original station, destroyed during the Korean War

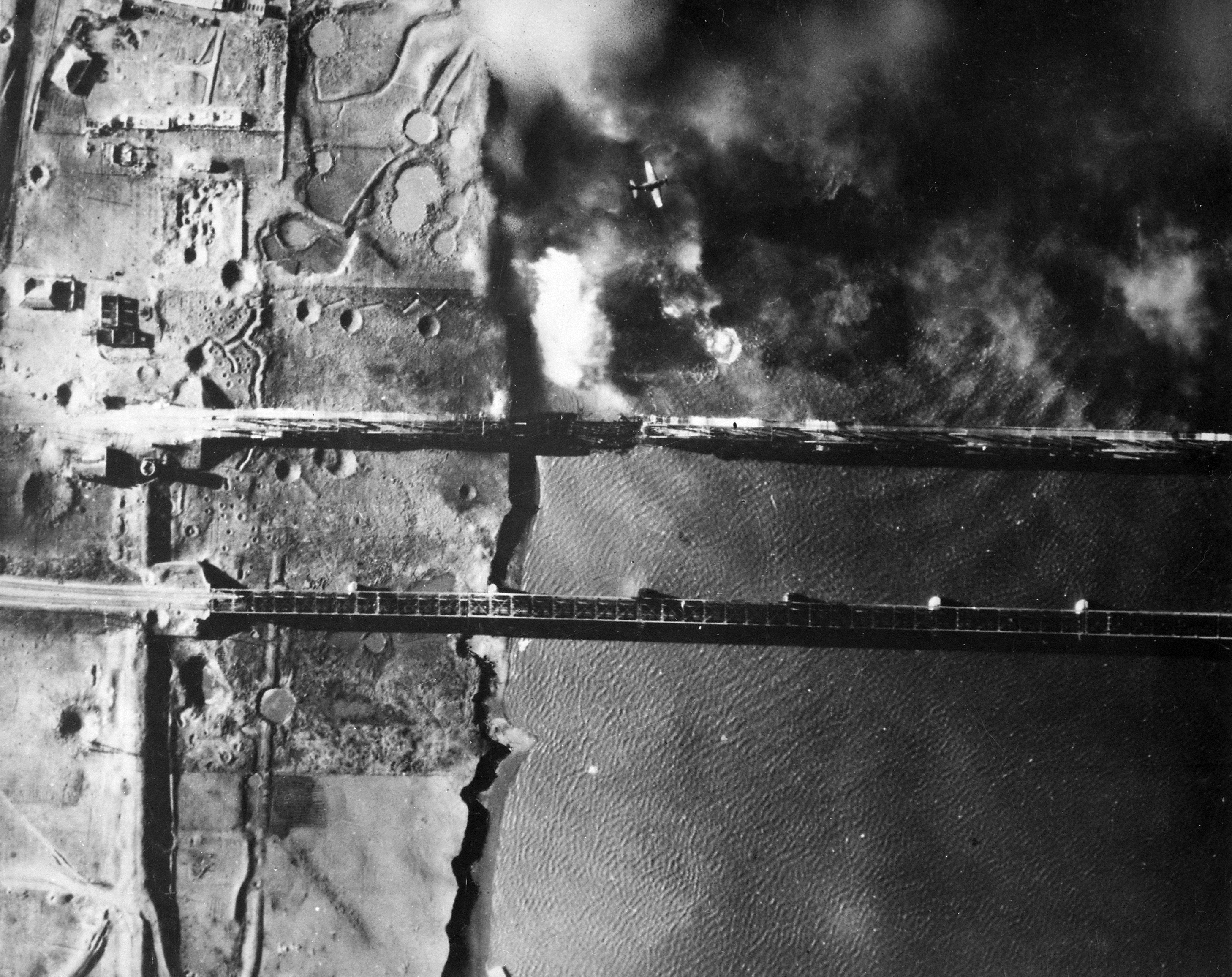
Aerial bombing of the Yalu River bridges in 1950

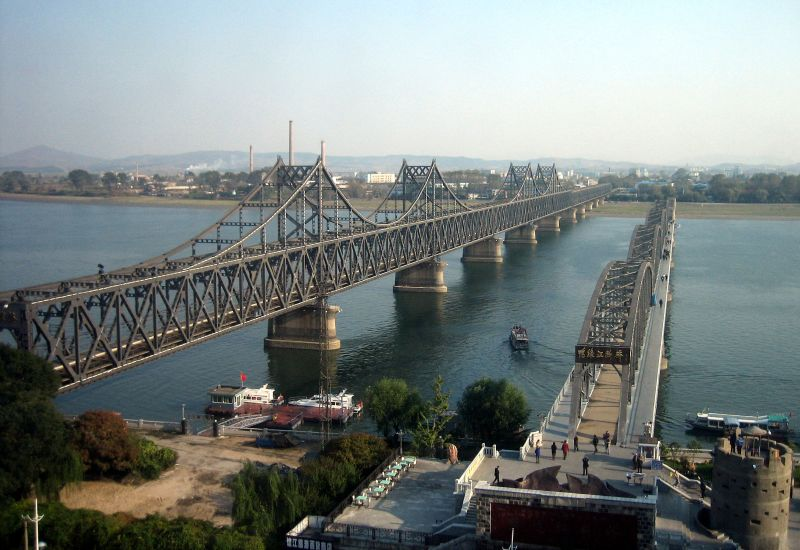
The current Sino-Korean Friendship Bridge next to the ruins of the old bridge
