= Opa station =

Railway station in Pyongwon County, North Korea

Coordinates: 39°19′38″N 125°39′3″E

Ŏp'a 어파

Korean name
- Hangul: 어파역
- Hanja: 漁波驛
- Revised Romanization: Eopa-yeok
- McCune–Reischauer: Ŏp'a-yŏk

General information
- Location: Ŏp'a-rodongjagu, P'yŏngwŏn, South P'yŏngan; North Korea
- Owner: Korean State Railway

History
- Opened: 5 November 1905

Services
Preceding station	Korean State Railway	Following station
Sukch'ŏn towards Dandong (China)	P'yŏngŭi Line	Sŏgam towards P'yŏngyang
Location

Ŏp'a station is a railway station in Ŏp'a-rodongjagu, P'yŏngwŏn County, South P'yŏngan Province, North Korea. It is on located on the P'yŏngŭi line of the Korean State Railway.

== History ==
The station was opened on 5 November 1905 along with the rest of this section of the Kyŏngŭi Line, from which the P'yŏngŭi Line was formed after the division of Korea in 1945. A pro-independence demonstration against the Japanese occupation of Korea of about a thousand people took place in front of the station on 7 March 1919.
