= Niso station =

Railway station in North Korea

Nisŏ 니서

Korean name
- Hangul: 니서역
- Hanja: 尼西驛
- Revised Romanization: Niseo-yeok
- McCune–Reischauer: Nisŏ-yŏk

General information
- Location: Mundŏk County, South P'yŏngan Province; North Korea
- Owner: Korean State Railway

Services
Preceding station	Korean State Railway	Following station
Mundŏk towards Dandong (China)	P'yŏngŭi Line	Sukch'ŏn towards P'yŏngyang

Nisŏ station is a railway station in Mundŏk County, South P'yŏngan Province, North Korea. It is on located on the P'yŏngŭi Line of the Korean State Railway.
