= Koup station =

Railway station in Chongju, North Korea

Coordinates: 39°36′23″N 125°18′28″E

Koŭp 고읍
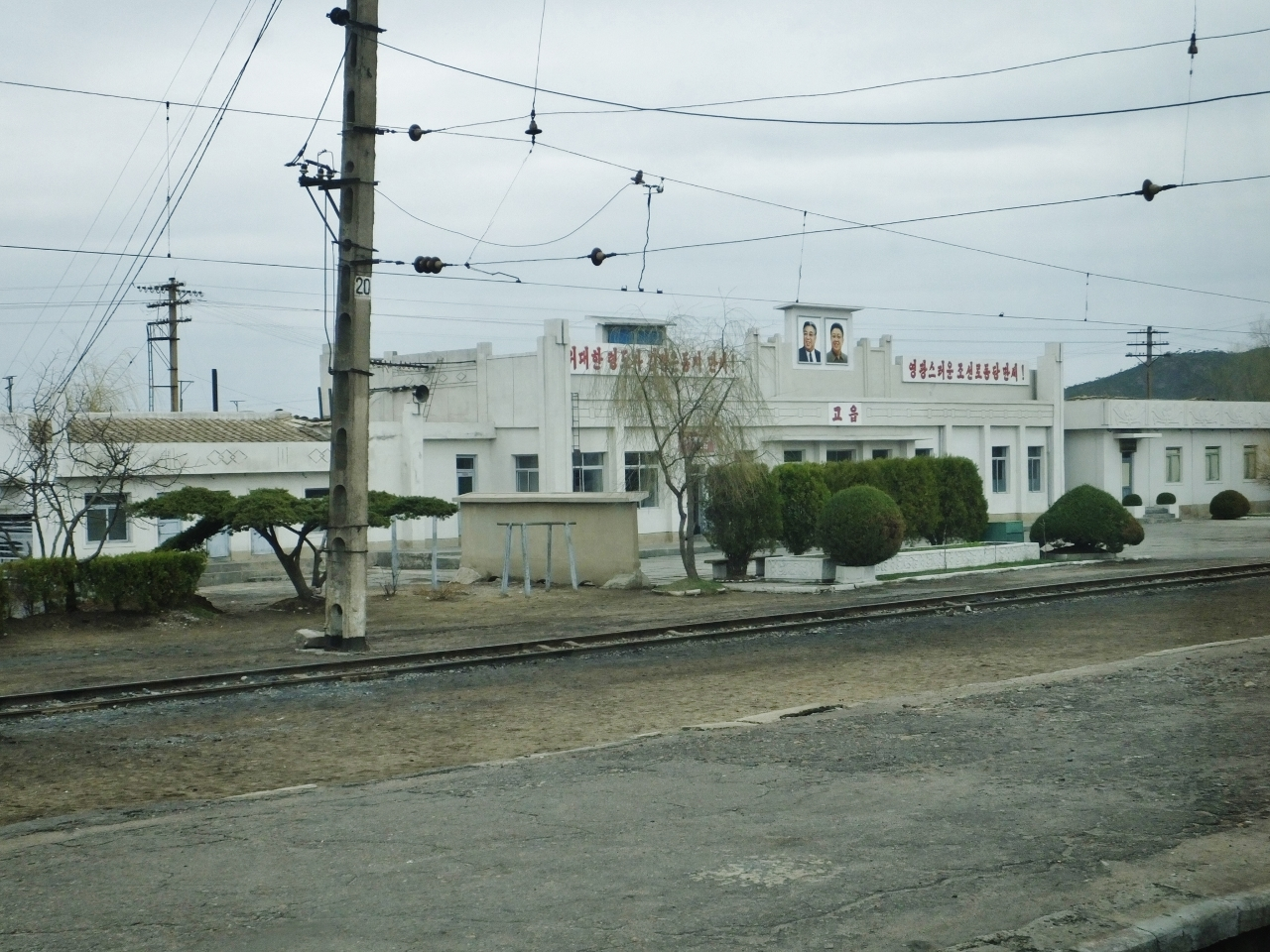

Korean name
- Hangul: 고읍역
- Hanja: 古邑驛
- Revised Romanization: Go-eup-yeok
- McCune–Reischauer: Koŭp-yŏk

General information
- Location: Chŏngju, North P'yŏngan Province; North Korea
- Owner: Korean State Railway

Services
Preceding station	Korean State Railway	Following station
Ch'ŏngju Ch'ŏngnyŏn towards Dandong (China)	P'yŏngŭi Line	Unam towards P'yŏngyang
Location

Koŭp station is a railway station in Chŏngju, North P'yŏngan Province, North Korea. It is on located on the P'yŏngŭi Line of the Korean State Railway.

== History ==
Originally opened as Koyū station, it received its current name in July 1945.
