= Kalli station =

Railway station in Pyongyang, North Korea

Coordinates: 39°08′44″N 125°41′58″E

Kalli 간리

Korean name
- Hangul: 간리역
- Hanja: 間里驛
- Revised Romanization: Galli-yeok
- McCune–Reischauer: Kalli-yŏk

General information
- Location: Hyongjesan-guyŏk, P'yŏngyang; North Korea
- Owner: Korean State Railway

History
- Opened: 11 February 1934
- Original company: Chosen Government Railway

Services
Preceding station	Korean State Railway	Following station
Sŏp'o towards P'yŏngyang	P'yŏngra Line	Chung'i towards Rajin
Sunan towards Dandong (China)	P'yŏngŭi Line	West P'yŏngyang towards P'yŏngyang
Sijŏng Terminus	Sijŏng Line	Terminus
Location

Kalli station is a railway station in Hyongjesan-guyŏk, P'yŏngyang, North Korea. It is located on the P'yŏngra and P'yŏngŭi lines of the Korean State Railway.

== History ==
The station was originally opened on 11 February 1934 by the Chosen Government Railway.
