= Sunan station =

Railway station in Sunan-guyŏk, P'yŏngyang, North Korea

Coordinates: 39.1961°N 125.6840°E

Sunan 순안

Korean name
- Hangul: 순안역
- Hanja: 順安驛
- Revised Romanization: Sun-an-yeok
- McCune–Reischauer: Sunan-yŏk

General information
- Location: Sunan-guyŏk, P'yŏngyang; North Korea
- Owner: Korean State Railway

Services
Preceding station	Korean State Railway	Following station
Sŏgam towards Dandong (China)	P'yŏngŭi Line	Kalli towards P'yŏngyang
Location

Sunan station is a railway station in Sunan-guyŏk, P'yŏngyang, North Korea. It is on located on the P'yŏngŭi Line of the Korean State Railway.

It is the closest station to the terminal building of P'yŏngyang International Airport, which is located about 800 metres (2,600 ft) from the station.
