= Mundok station =

Railway station in Mundok County, North Korea

Coordinates: 39°29′52″N 125°35′26″E

Mundŏk 문덕

Korean name
- Hangul: 문덕역
- Hanja: 文德驛
- Revised Romanization: Mundeok-yeok
- McCune–Reischauer: Mundŏk-yŏk

General information
- Location: Mundŏk-ŭp, Mundŏk County, South P'yŏngan Province; North Korea
- Owner: Korean State Railway

History
- Opened: 5 November 1905

Services
Preceding station	Korean State Railway	Following station
Taegyo towards Dandong (China)	P'yŏngŭi Line	Nisŏ towards P'yŏngyang
Songbom towards Hwap'ung	Sŏhae Line	Terminus
Location

Mundŏk station is a railway station in Mundŏk-ŭp, Mundŏk County, South P'yŏngan Province, North Korea. It is the junction point of the P'yŏngŭi and Sŏhae lines of the Korean State Railway.

== History ==
The station was opened, together with the rest of this section of the Kyŏngŭi Line, on 5 November 1905. Originally called Mansŏng station, it was given its current name in July 1945.
