= Sijong Line =

Railway line in North Korea

Sijŏng Line

Overview
- Native name: 시정선 (柴井線)
- Status: Operational
- Owner: Korean State Railway
- Locale: South P'yŏngan, P'yŏngyang
- Termini: Kalli; Sijŏng
- Stations: 2

Service
- Type: Heavy rail, freight rail
- Operator(s): Korean State Railway

Technical
- Line length: 8.0 km (5.0 mi)
- Number of tracks: Single track
- Track gauge: 1,435 mm (4 ft 8 1/2 in) standard gauge
- Electrification: 3000 V DC Catenary

- Sijong Line
- Hangul: 시정선
- Hanja: 柴井線
- RR: Sijeongseon
- MR: Sijŏngsŏn

The Sijŏng Line is an electrified standard-gauge freight-only secondary line of the Korean State Railway in South P'yŏngan Province and P'yŏngyang, North Korea, running from Kalli on the P'yŏngŭi Line to Sijŏng.

== Route ==
A yellow background in the "Distance" box indicates that section of the line is not electrified.

| Distance (km) | | Station Name | | Former Name | | |
| Total | S2S | Transcribed | Chosŏn'gŭl (Hanja) | Transcribed | Chosŏn'gŭl (Hanja) | Connections |
|---|---|---|---|---|---|---|
| 0.0 | 0.0 | Kalli | 간리 (間里) | | | P'yŏngŭi Line, P'yŏngra Line |
| 8.0 | 8.0 | Sijŏng | 시정 (柴井) | | | |
