= Sukchon station =

Railway station in Sukchon County, North Korea

Coordinates: 39°24′41″N 125°37′5″E

Sukch'ŏn 숙천

Korean name
- Hangul: 숙천역
- Hanja: 肅川驛
- Revised Romanization: Sukcheon-yeok
- McCune–Reischauer: Sukch'ŏn-yŏk

General information
- Location: Sukch'ŏn-ŭp, Sukch'ŏn County, South P'yŏngan Province; North Korea
- Owner: Korean State Railway

History
- Opened: 5 November 1905

Services
Preceding station	Korean State Railway	Following station
Nisŏ towards Dandong (China)	P'yŏngŭi Line	Ŏp'a towards P'yŏngyang
Location

Sukch'ŏn station is a railway station in Sukch'ŏn-ŭp, Sukch'ŏn County, South P'yŏngan Province, North Korea. It is on located on the P'yŏngŭi Line of the Korean State Railway.

== History ==
The station was opened, together with the rest of this section of the Kyŏngŭi Line, on 5 November 1905. Originally called Shukusen station, it was given its current name in July 1945.
