= Taegyo station =

Railway station in Anju, North Korea

Coordinates: 39°33′41″N 125°34′36″E

Taegyo 대교
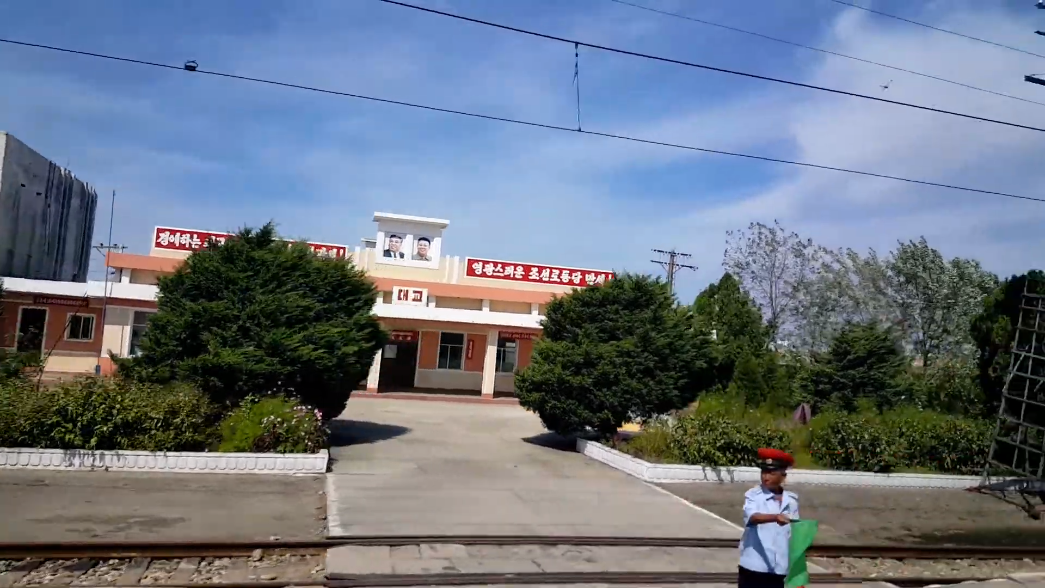

Korean name
- Hangul: 대교역
- Hanja: 大橋驛
- Revised Romanization: Daegyo-yeok
- McCune–Reischauer: Taegyo-yŏk

General information
- Location: Ch'angsong-dong, Anju-si, South P'yŏngan; North Korea
- Owner: Korean State Railway

History
- Opened: 16 July 1938
- Original company: Chosen Government Railway

Services
Preceding station	Korean State Railway	Following station
Sinanju Ch'ŏngnyŏn towards Dandong (China)	P'yŏngŭi Line	Mundŏk towards P'yŏngyang
Location

Taegyo station is a railway station in Ch'angsong-dong, Anju-si, South P'yŏngan Province, North Korea. It is on located on the P'yŏngŭi Line of the Korean State Railway.

== History ==
The station was originally opened on 16 July 1938 by the Chosen Government Railway.
