= Hadan station (Pyongui Line) =

Railway station in Chongju, North Korea

Hadan 하단
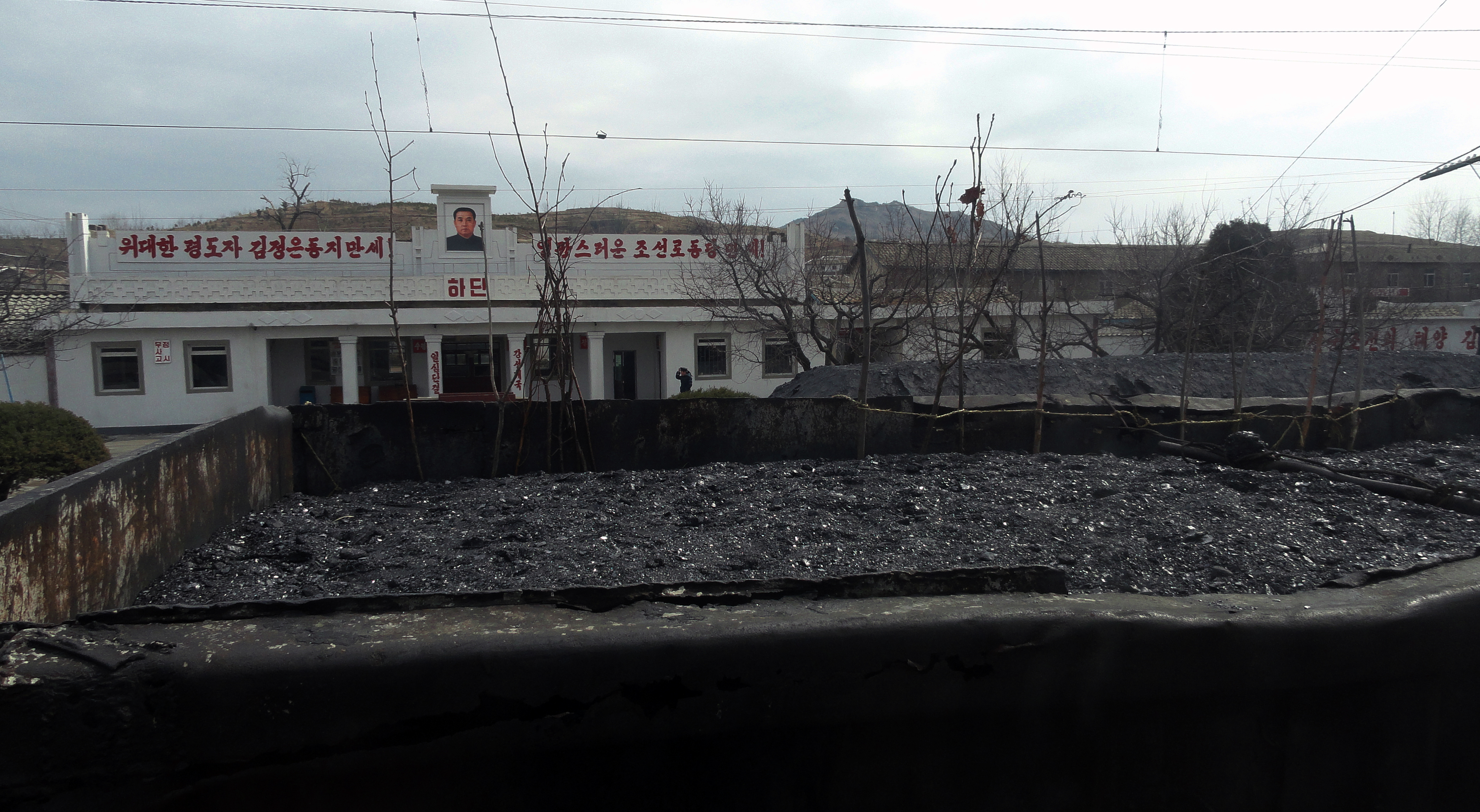

Korean name
- Hangul: 하단역
- Hanja: 下端驛
- Revised Romanization: Hadan-yeok
- McCune–Reischauer: Hadan-yŏk

General information
- Location: Chŏngju, North P'yŏngan Province; North Korea
- Coordinates: 39.6784°N 125.1640°E
- Owner: Korean State Railway

History
- Opened: 16 July 1938
- Original company: Chosen Government Railway

Services
Preceding station	Korean State Railway	Following station
Kwaksan towards Dandong (China)	P'yŏngŭi Line	Ch'ŏngju Ch'ŏngnyŏn towards P'yŏngyang
Location

Hadan station is a railway station in Chŏngju, North P'yŏngan Province, North Korea. It is on located on the P'yŏngŭi Line of the Korean State Railway.

== History ==
The station was originally opened on 16 July 1938 by the Chosen Government Railway.
