= Pongdong station =

Railway station in North Korea

Coordinates: 37.9468°N 126.6219°E

Pongdong 봉동

Korean name
- Hangul: 봉동역
- Hanja: 鳳東驛
- Revised Romanization: Bongdong-yeok
- McCune–Reischauer: Pongdong-yŏk

General information
- Location: Pongsan County, North Hwanghae Province; North Korea
- Owner: Korean State Railway
- Operator: Korean State Railway
- Platforms: 1 (1 side platform)
- Tracks: 1

History
- Opened: 1 July 1923
- Closed: 1950-1953
- Rebuilt: 2003
- Original company: Chosen Government Railway

Services
Preceding station	Korean State Railway	Following station
Sonha towards P'yŏngyang	P'yŏngbu Line Not in regular service	P'anmun towards Dorasan (ROK)
Location

Pongdong station is a railway station located in Pongsan County, North Hwanghae province, North Korea. It is on located on the P'yŏngbu Line, which was formed from part of the Kyŏngŭi Line to accommodate the shift of the capital from Seoul to P'yŏngyang; though this line physically connects P'yŏngyang to Pusan via Dorasan, in operational reality it ends at Kaesŏng due to the Korean Demilitarized Zone.

== History ==
Although the Kyŏngŭi Line was originally opened on 3 April 1906, the station itself was opened by the Chosen Government Railway for passenger and freight service on 1 July 1923. The station was closed after the Korean War. The station, as well as the disused section from Kaesŏng across the DMZ to Dorasan, was rebuilt in 2003, and a special train inaugurating the reopened line ran on 17 May 2007. Regular freight service began between Dorasan and the Kaesŏng Industrial Region, and although passenger service for South Korean workers exists between Dorasan and the Kaesŏng Industrial Area, apart from the inaugural special train, there has been no passenger service to Sonha station. The freight and passenger services have been interrupted several times as a result of political events between North and South that have caused the closure of the industrial district; it was most recently reopened on 16 September 2013 after a five-month shutdown.
