= Sogam station =

Railway station in Pyongyang, North Korea

Coordinates: 39.2503°N 125.7027°E

Sŏgam 순안

Korean name
- Hangul: 석암역
- Hanja: 石岩驛
- Revised Romanization: Seogam-yeok
- McCune–Reischauer: Sŏgam-yŏk

General information
- Location: Taegam-ri, Sunan-guyŏk, P'yŏngyang; North Korea
- Owner: Korean State Railway

History
- Opened: 1 July 1923
- Former names: T'aegam
- Original company: Chosen Government Railway

Services
Preceding station	Korean State Railway	Following station
Ŏp'a towards Dandong (China)	P'yŏngŭi Line	Sunan towards P'yŏngyang
Location

Sŏgam station is a railway station in Taegam-ri, Sunan-guyŏk, P'yŏngyang, North Korea. It is located on the P'yŏngŭi line of the Korean State Railway.

== History ==
The station, originally called T'aegam station, was opened by the Chosen Government Railway on 1 July 1923.
