= Chonggang station =

Railway station in Tongrim County, North Korea

Coordinates: 39.8349°N 124.8206°E

Ch'ŏnggang 청강역

Korean name
- Hangul: 청강역
- Hanja: 淸江驛
- Revised Romanization: Cheonggang-yeok
- McCune–Reischauer: Ch'ŏnggang-yŏk

General information
- Location: Ch'ŏnggang-ri, Tongrim County, North P'yŏngan Province; North Korea
- Owner: Korean State Railway

History
- Opened: 5 November 1905

Services
Preceding station	Korean State Railway	Following station
Tongrim towards Dandong (China)	P'yŏngŭi Line	Sŏnch'ŏn towards P'yŏngyang
Location

Ch'ŏnggang station is a railway station in Ch'ŏnggang-ri, Tongrim County, North P'yŏngan Province, North Korea. It is on located on the P'yŏngŭi Line of the Korean State Railway.

== History ==
The station was opened, along with the rest of this section of the Kyŏngŭi Line, on 5 November 1905; it was originally called Tongrim station, receiving its current name in July 1945.
