= Pyongwon County =

P'yŏngwŏn County 평원군
- County

Korean transcription(s)
  - Chosŏn'gŭl: 평원군
  - Hancha: 平原郡
  - McCune-Reischauer: P'yŏngwŏn-gun
  - Revised Romanization: Pyeongwon-gun
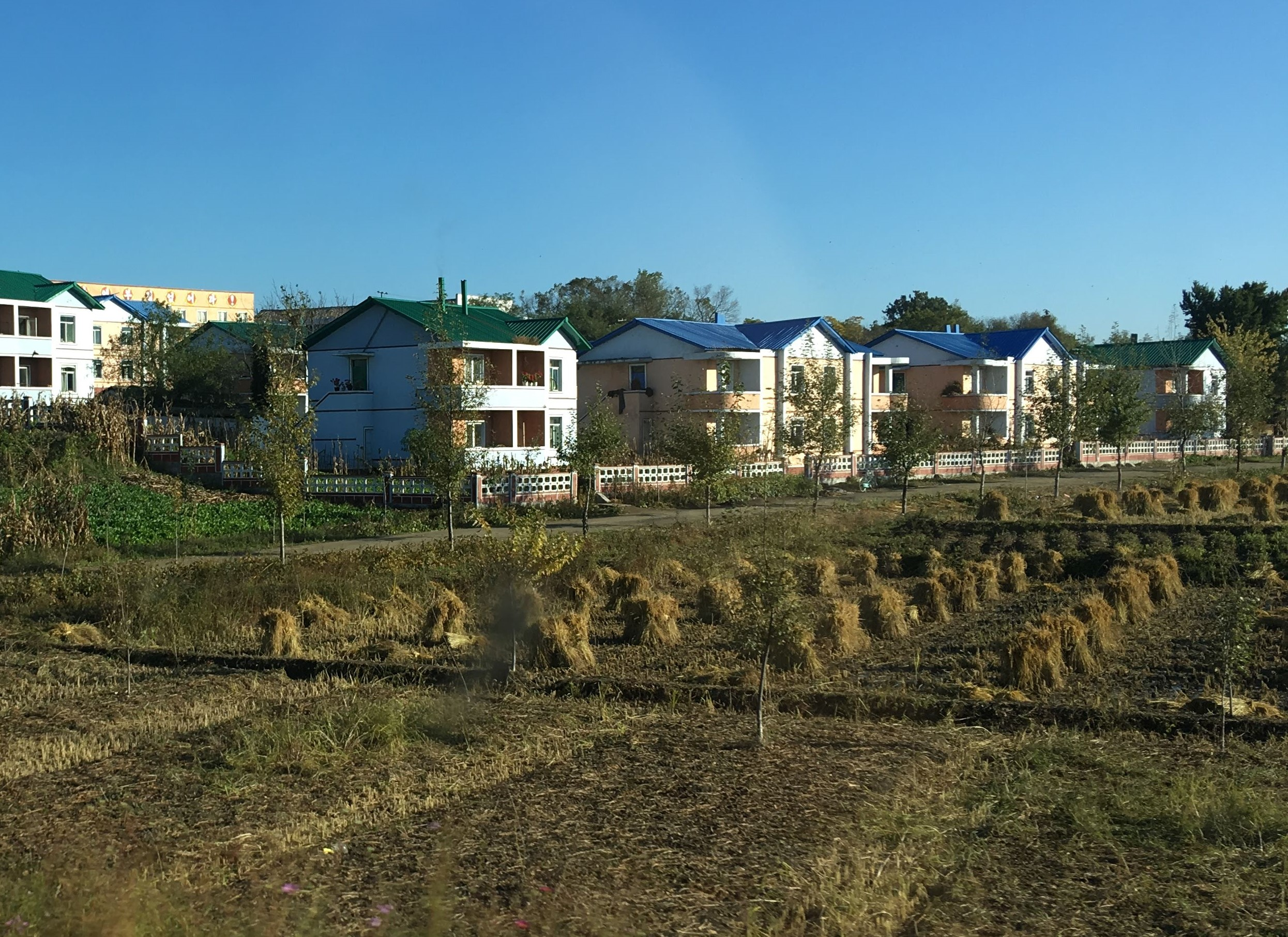
- Village in Pyongwon County.

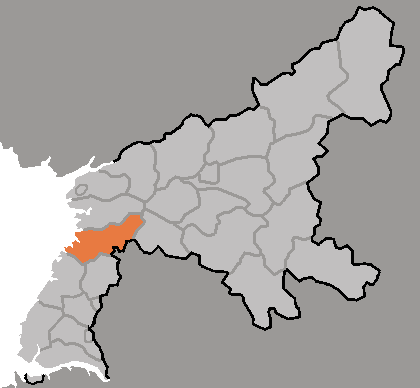
- Map of South Pyongan showing the location of Pyongwon
- Country: North Korea
- Province: South P'yŏngan
- Administrative divisions: 1 ŭp, 2 workers' districts, 29 ri

Area
  - Total: 451.53 km^{2} (174.34 sq mi)

Population (2008)
  - Total: 179,492
  - Density: 397.52/km^{2} (1,029.6/sq mi)

P'yŏngwŏn County is a kun (county) in South P'yŏngan province, North Korea.

== Administrative divisions ==
P'yŏngwŏn County is divided into 1 ŭp (town), 2 rodongjagu (workers' districts) and 29 ri (villages):

- P'yŏngwŏn-ŭp (평원읍)
- Hanch'ŏl-lodongjagu (한천로동자구)
- Ŏp'a-rodongjagu (어파로동자구)
- Ch'ŏngbo-ri (청보리)
- Ch'ŏngryong-ri (청룡리)
- Hwajil-li (화진리)
- Namsal-li (남산리)
- Paejŏl-li (배전리)
- Ryanggyo-ri (량교리)
- Ryong'i-ri (룡이리)
- Ryongsang-ri (룡상리)
- Sambong-ri (삼봉리)
- Samsong-ri (삼송리)
- Simwŏl-li (심원리)
- Sinsŏng-ri (신성리)
- Sinsong-ri (신송리)
- Sŏg'am-ri (석암리)
- Sŏkkyo-ri (석교리)
- Songhwa-ri (송화리)
- Songrim-ri (송림리)
- Songsŏng-ri (송석리)
- Taeam-ri (대암리)
- Taejŏng-ri (대정리)
- Taep'ung-ri (대풍리)
- Tŏkche-ri (덕제리)
- Tŏkp'o-ri (덕포리)
- Ullyong-ri (운룡리)
- Unbong-ri (운봉리)
- Unhŭng-ri (운흥리)
- Wŏn'am-ri (원압리)
- Wŏnhwa-ri (원화리)
- Wŏr'il-li (월일리)

== Transportation ==
P'yŏngwŏn County is served by the P'yŏngŭi Line of the Korean State Railway.
