= Pyongui Line =

Railway connecting Pyongyang, North Korea and Dandong, China

P'yŏngŭi Line
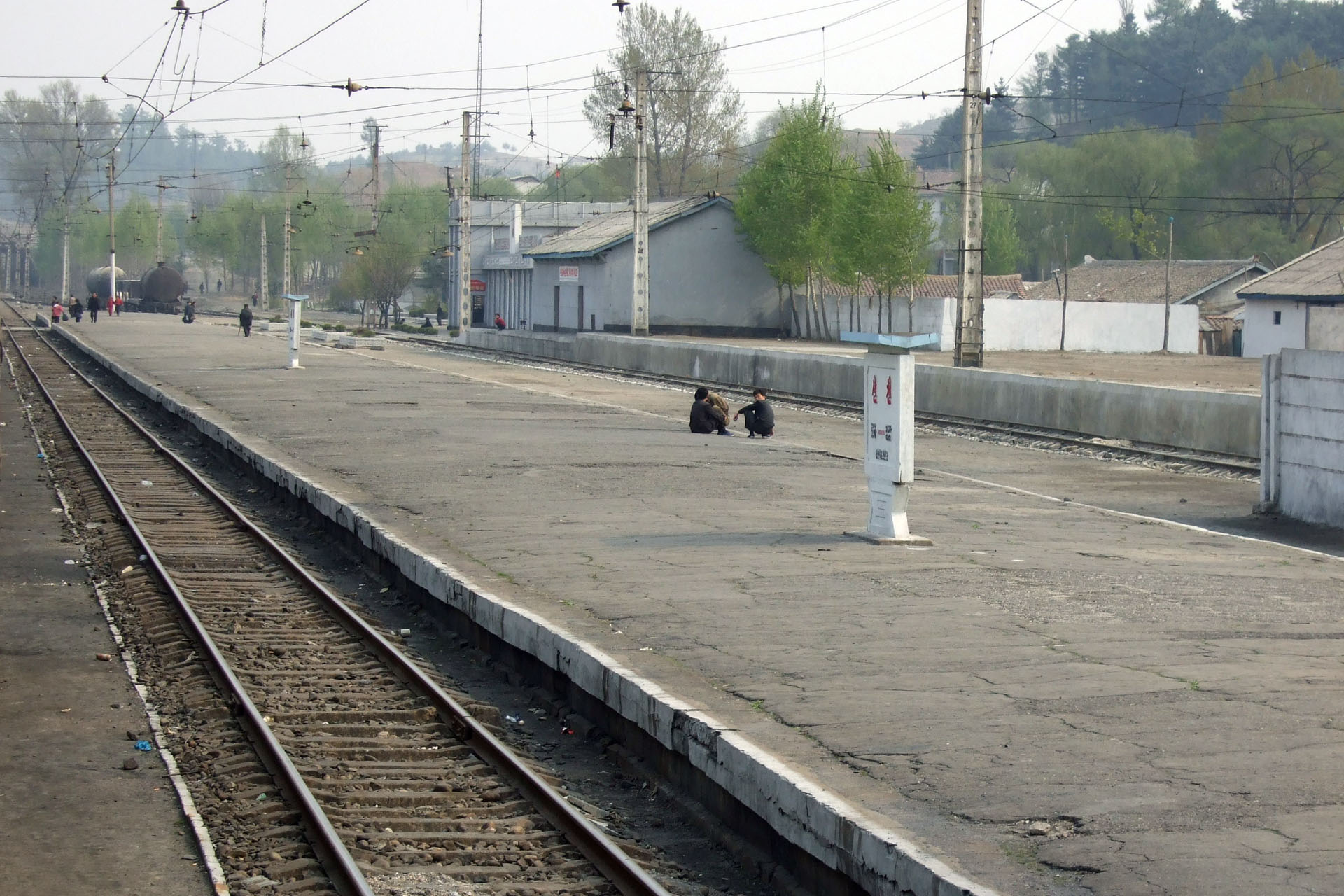
- View of the platform at Sŏnch'ŏn station on the P'yŏngŭi Line.

Overview
- Native name: 평의선 (平義線)
- Owner: Temporary Military Railway (1905–1906); National Railway (1906–1909); Korea Railway (1909–1910); Chosen Government Railway (1910–1917); South Manchuria Railway (1917–1925); Chosen Government Railway (1925–1945); Korean State Railway (since 1945)
- Locale: P'yŏngyang, South P'yŏngan, North P'yŏngan
- Termini: P'yŏngyang; Sinŭiju Ch'ŏngnyŏn
- Stations: 33

Service
- Type: Heavy rail, Regional rail Passenger/Freight
- Depot(s): P'yŏngyang, West P'yŏngyang, Chŏngju, Sinŭiju Ch'ŏngnyŏn (locomotive); P'yŏngyang, Kangan (rolling stock)

History
- Opened: 28 April 1905 (freight); 1 April 1908 (passenger)

Technical
- Line length: 225 km (140 mi)
- Number of tracks: Double track (P'yŏngyang–Kalli, Ŏpa–Sukch'ŏn, South Sinŭiju–Sinŭiju Ch'ŏngnyŏn); Single track
- Track gauge: 1,435 mm (4 ft 8 1/2 in) standard gauge
- Minimum radius: 300 m (980 ft)
- Electrification: 3000 V DC Catenary
- Operating speed: 100 km/h (62 mph) (nominal); 40 km/h (25 mph) (actual)
- Maximum incline: 11‰
Route map
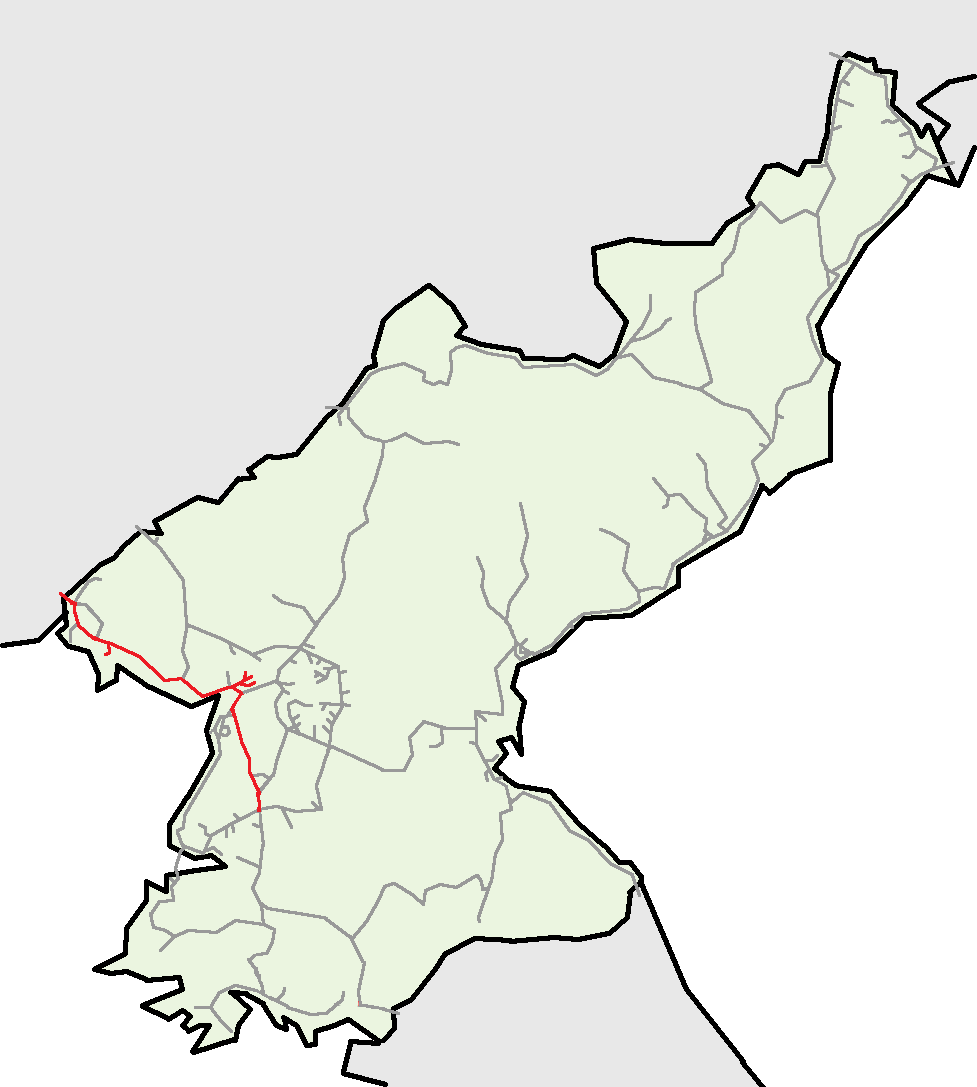

- Pyongui Line
- Hangul: 평의선
- Hanja: 平義線
- RR: Pyeonguiseon
- MR: P'yŏngŭisŏn

The P'yŏngŭi Line is an electrified main trunk line of the Korean State Railway of North Korea, running from P'yŏngyang to Sinŭiju on the border with China. It is the main corridor for overland traffic between North Korea and China, and is one of the country's most important rail lines. A bridge over the Yalu River connects Sinŭiju to the Chinese city of Dandong and the Shendan Line of the China Railway to Shenyang and Chinese points beyond.

== Description ==
The total length of the line is 225.1 km (139.9 mi), which corresponds to 5.3% of the total national railway network. Although most of the line is single track, the P'yŏngyang–Kalli (17.9 km (11.1 mi)), Sukch'ŏn–Ŏp'a (10.6 km (6.6 mi)) and Sinŭiju–South Sinŭiju sections (5.2 km (3.2 mi)) are double-tracked. The ruling grade on the line is 11‰, and the minimum curve radius is 300 m (980 ft). The average distance between stations is 7.5 km (4.7 mi)

The P'yŏngyang–Sŏgam section is under the jurisdiction of the P'yŏngyang Railway Bureau, while the Sŏgam–Sinŭiju section is under the Kaech'ŏn Railway Bureau.

There are 177 bridges with a total length of 9,083 m (29,800 ft) and 5 tunnels with a total length of 2,383 m (7,818 ft). Although the average length of the bridges is only 51 m (167 ft), the P'yŏngŭi Line nevertheless features the longest railway bridge in the DPRK - over 1,200 m (3,900 ft) in length. There are locomotive depots at P'yŏngyang, West P'yŏngyang, Chŏngju and Sinŭiju Ch'ŏngnyŏn stations, and two rolling stock maintenance facilities, one at P'yŏngyang, and one for passenger cars at Kangan station in Sinŭiju.

Deceased North Korean leader Kim Jong-il used to travel on the P'yŏngŭi Line for visits to China, as he did not fly.

== History ==
=== Origins, to 1945 ===
For the original line's history and other information prior to 1945, see Gyeongui Line (1904–1945).

The Kyŏngŭi Line was originally opened by the Temporary Military Railway Office established by the Empire of Japan to aid in the movement of its forces during the Russo-Japanese War and to strengthen its influence over Korea. Freight service on the entirety of the line from Kyŏngsŏng to Sinŭiju started in April 1906, and on 1 September of that year, the Railway Office took over control of the Kyŏngŭi Line from the military and merged it with the Kyŏngbu Railway to create the National Railway Administration, which took over ownership and operation of the Kyŏngŭi Line.

=== Liberation, Partition and the Korean War, 1945–1953 ===
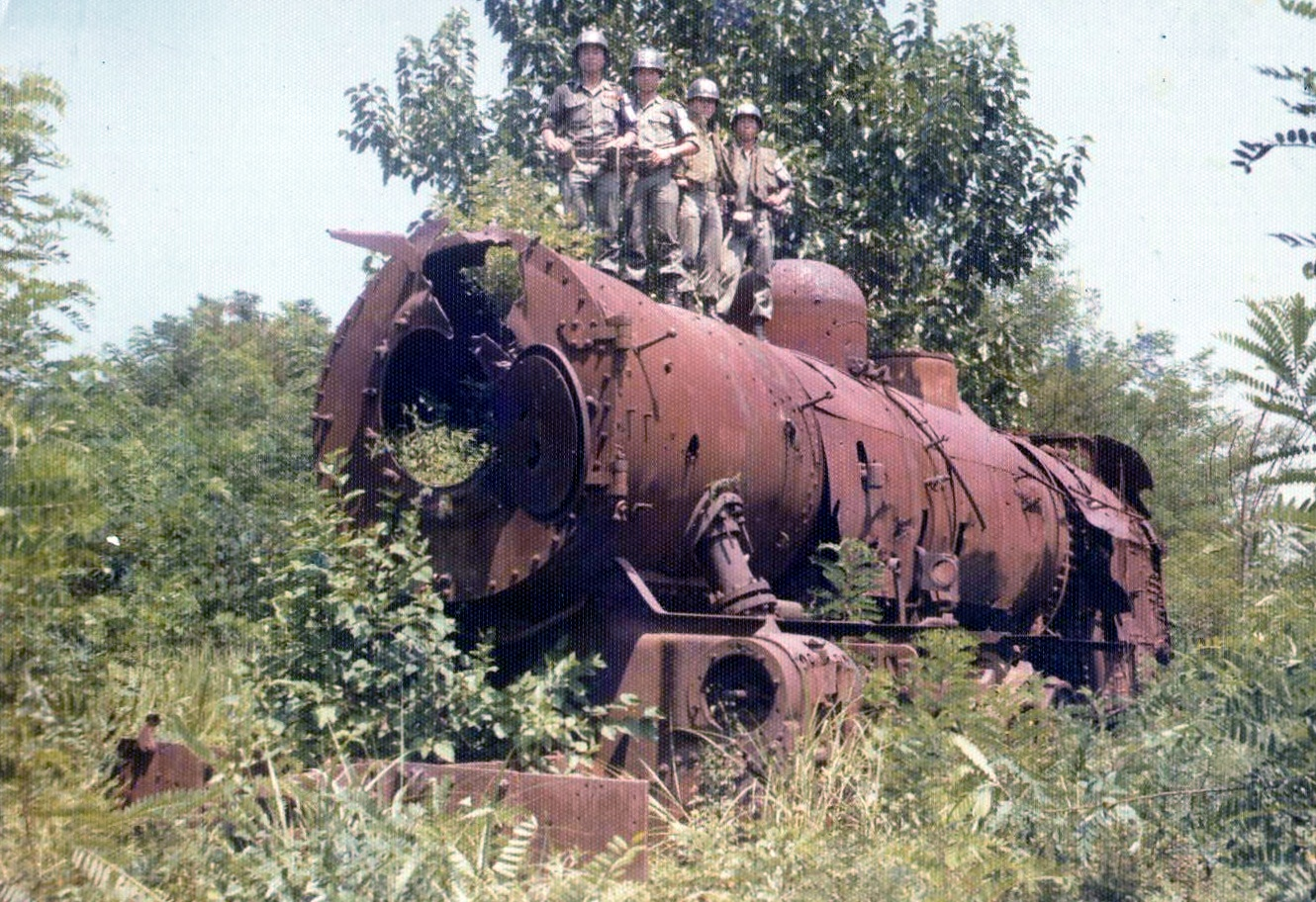
The ruins of the locomotive Matei 10 at Changdan in 1976.

Following the end of the Pacific War and the subsequent partition of Korea, the Kyŏngŭi Line was divided at the 38th parallel, between Tosŏng and Sariwŏn. On 25 August 1945, the Soviet Army began operating trains on the Kyŏngŭi Line north of Sariwŏn, and on 10 August 1946 the Provisional People’s Committee for North Korea nationalised all railways in the Soviet-occupied part of Korea, creating the Korean State Railway, and on 9 September 1948 the Kyŏngŭi Line was split, with the P'yŏngyang–Sinŭiju section becoming the P'yŏngŭi Line (from the names of the two termini, P'yŏngyang and Sinŭiju), and the P'yŏngyang–Kaesŏng–DMZ section becoming the P'yŏngbu Line (from P'yŏngyang and the theoretical southern terminus of the line, Pusan). Despite the partition, trains continued to operate along the Kyŏngŭi Line until the outbreak of the Korean War in 1950. On 31 December 1950, a passenger train, consisting of the locomotive MaTeI 10 and 25 cars, going from Hanp'o to Munsan was ordered to stop at Changdan by the US Army and was destroyed. The locomotive is now on display at Imjingak. The Munsan-Kaesong section was thus closed, severing the north–south railway connection. Between April 1937 and May 1943, the Imperial Japanese Army built a second bridge across the Yalu River; both this newer bridge and the original bridge were attacked repeatedly between November 1950 and February 1951 by US Air Force bombers, but were repeatedly repaired. After the end of the Korean War, the 1911 bridge was left destroyed, and only the newer bridge was repaired and returned to use. In 1990 the bridge was given its current name, Sino–Korean Friendship Bridge. The entirety of the line suffered severe damage during the Korean War.

=== Post-war, since 1953 ===
After the end of the Korean War, with Soviet and Chinese assistance the line was quickly rebuilt and modernised.

An agreement was signed between the DPRK and China on cross-border train service on 5 February 1954, and a Beijing–P'yŏngyang through-train service began, using China Railway rolling stock, on 3 June of the same year. In 1964, through a rearrangement of lines, the main line was shortened by almost 11 km (6.8 mi). To accomplish this, the South Sinŭiju–Naejung–Yŏmju section of the Yangsi Line was made the mainline of the P'yŏngŭi Line, while the former mainline, South Sinŭiju–Paengma–Yŏmju, was split off to become the current Paengma Line. Also, in August of that year, the electrification of the entire line from P'yŏngyang to Sinŭiju was completed, and at the same time the track was upgraded with heavy rail, and 68% of the sleepers were replaced with concrete sleepers. Semi-automatic train control was also installed, with the line divided into two sections, P'yŏngyang–Kalli and Kalli–Sinŭiju.

The 1970s saw the opening of new branchlines connecting to the P'yŏngŭi Line mainline - the Sŏhae Line (also known as the Anju Colliery Line) from Mundŏk to Namdong to serve coal mines in the area, as well as the Ch'ŏngch'ŏn'gang–Songdo–Kubongsan–Ryonghŭng Kubongsan Line, and in 1976, the Ch'ŏnghwaryŏk Line from Kubongsan to the Ch'ŏngch'ŏn River Thermal Power Plant and the Namhŭng Line from Songdo to Namhŭng to serve the Namhŭng Youth Chemical Complex; both the power plant and the chemical complex were opened that year.

To facilitate the construction of the Sŏhae Satellite Launching Station, the Ch'ŏlsan Line was extended in the early 2000s to the launch facility via Ch'ŏlsan and Tongchang. On 22 April 2004, the worst railway disaster in the DPRK occurred when a train carrying ammonium nitrate fertiliser exploded at Ryongch'ŏn Station.

== Planned Sinŭiju–Kaesŏng high-speed railway ==
On 8 December 2013, an agreement was reached between North Korea and a consortium of Chinese companies to construct a high-speed railway connecting Kaesŏng, P'yŏngyang, and Sinŭiju. The project is to be a build-operate-transfer arrangement, in which the construction, scheduled to take five years, will be funded by the consortium, which will then operate the line for 30 years, after which the Railway Ministry will take over operations and complete ownership of the line. The rail line is to be a double-track line of about 400 km (250 mi) with an operating speed of over 200 km/h (120 mph).

== Services ==
The P'yŏngŭi Line serves numerous important industrial centres such as Tongrim, Mundŏk, Chŏngju and the Sinŭiju Industrial Zone, as well as Tŏkhyŏn (iron ore), Ryongamp'o (machinery manufacturing), Paengma (chemicals), Ryangch'aek (petrochemicals, machinery), Kusŏng (machinery, textiles), Ch'ŏngsu (chemicals), Namhŭng (chemicals), Kaech'ŏn (coal) and Ch'ŏngnam (coal), thus being one of the DPRK's major economic arteries. It also plays a major role in foreign trade; Sinŭiju station is the most important railway station in the DPRK in terms of quantity of freight moved for import and export, accounting for 59.1% of export cargo and 38.5% of import cargo volume in 1983, as not only freight to and from China was shipped via Sinŭiju, but also cargo to and from the Soviet Union and the socialist countries in Europe. Although much of the traffic with Europe has dried up since the collapse of communism in Europe and the shift of traffic to and from Russia to the Hongŭi Line, Sinŭiju still remains the most important railway border station.

According to the 1996 timetable, the travel time between P'yŏngyang and Sinŭiju was 4 hours 30 minutes; in comparison, the travel time over the same relation for the "Koa" limited express of 1942 was 4 hours 15 minutes, despite running via the longer Paengma Line. Although in the past speeds of up to 100 km/h (62 mph) were reached on the line, in recent years the average speeds of passenger trains on the line have fallen to around 40 km/h (25 mph). There are also various commuter trains on the line, such as between Sinŭiju and Ryongchŏn, and between Sinŭiju and Chŏngju, and to the Namhŭng Youth Chemical Complex. The following passenger trains are known to operate on this line:

- International express trains 5/6, operating between P'yŏngyang and Beijing, China, run along the entirety of this line between P'yŏngyang and Sinŭiju;
- Express trains 19/20, operating between P'yŏngyang and Huich'ŏn, run on this line between P'yŏngyang and Sinanju;
- Semi-express trains 115/116, operating between P'yŏngyang and Ch'ŏngsu, run on this line between P'yŏngyang and Chŏngju;
- Semi-express trains 124-125/126-127, operating between Sinŭiju Ch'ŏngny'ŏn and Ch'ŏngjin Ch'ŏngnyŏn, run on the entirety of this line between Sinuiju and P'yŏngyang;
- Semi-express trains 142-143/144-145, operating between Sinŭiju Ch'ŏngnyŏn and Kaesŏng, run on the entirety of this line between Sinuiju and P'yŏngyang;
- Semi-express trains 146-147/148-149, operating between Sinŭiju Ch'ŏngnyŏn and Namp'o, run on the entirety of this line between Sinuiju and P'yŏngyang;
- Regional trains 200/201, operating between West P'yŏngyang and Ch'ŏngsu, run on this line between West P'yŏngyang and Chŏngju;
- Regional trains 222-223/224, operating between Kalli and Kaesŏng, run on this line between Kalli and P'yŏngyang;
- Regional trains 249/250 operate between P'yŏngyang and Sŏgam;
- Regional trains 250-251/252-253, operating between Sinŭiju Ch'ŏngnyŏn and Huich'ŏn Ch'ŏngnyŏn, run on this line between Sinuiju and Sinanju;
- Local trains 302-303/304-305, operating between Sunan and Kangdong, run on this line between Sunan and P'yŏngyang;
- Local trains 418/419, operating between Sinuiju Ch'ŏngnyŏn and Yŏmju via the Paengma line, run on this line between Sinŭiju and South Sinŭiju.

== Route ==
A yellow background in the "Distance" box indicates that section of the line is not electrified.

Distance (km)								
Current		Original		Station Name		Former Name		
Total	S2S	Total	S2S	Transcribed	Chosŏn'gŭl (Hanja)	Transcribed	Chosŏn'gŭl (Hanja)	Connections (former)
0.0	0.0	0.0	0.0	Pyongyang	평양 (平壤)			Phyongbu Line, Phyongnam Line, P'yŏngdŏk Line, Phyongra Line ● Ch'ŏllima Line Yŏnggwang Station ● Tram Line 1
4.7	4.7	4.7	4.7	West Pyongyang (Sopyongyang)	서평양 (西平壤)			Phyongra Line ● Tram Line 3
9.6	4.9	11.1	6.4	Sopho	서포 (西浦)			Ryongsong Line ● Chollima Line Sopho Station (planned)
14.3	4.7	↓	↓	Sanum	산음 (山陰)			Sanum Branch
17.6	3.3	19.1	8.0	Kalli	간리 (間里)			Phyongra Line, Sijong Line
23.9	6.3	25.2	6.1	Sunan	순안 (順安)			Pyongyang International Airport
30.8	6.9	33.5	8.3	Sogam	석암 (石巖)			Station relocated
41.6	10.8	41.1	7.6	Opha	어파 (漁波)			
52.4	10.8	51.9	10.8	Sukchon	숙천 (肅川)			
~~57.8~~	~~5.4~~	~~57.3~~	~~5.4~~	Niso	니서 (尼西)			Closed
62.7	4.9	62.2	4.9	Mundok	문덕 (文德)	Mansŏng	만성 (萬城)	Sohae Line
71.0	8.3	70.5	8.3	Taegyo	대교 (大橋)			(Songbop Branch)
76.2	5.2	75.7	5.2	Sinanju Chongnyon	신안주청년 (新安州靑年)	Sinanju	신안주 (新安州)	Kaechon Line
80.2	4.0	79.7	4.0	Chongchongang	청천강 (淸川江)			Kubongsan Line
82.0	1.8	81.5	1.8	Maengjungri	맹중리 (孟中里)			Namhong Line (Pakchon Line)
89.6	7.6	89.1	7.4	Unjon	운전 (雲田)	Yŏngmi	영미 (嶺美)	
102.6	13.0	102.1	13.0	Unam	운암 (雲巖)	Unjŏn	운전 (雲田)	
111.1	8.5	110.6	8.5	Koup	고읍 (古邑)			
123.9	12.8	123.4	12.8	Chongju Chongnyon	정주청년 (定州靑年)	Chŏngju	정주 (定州)	Phyongbuk Line
128.6	4.7	128.1	4.7	Hadan	하단 (下端)			
136.5	7.9	136.0	7.9	Kwaksan	곽산 (郭山)			
148.1	11.6	147.6	11.6	Roha	로하 (路下)	Noha	노하 (路下)	
157.4	9.3	156.9	9.3	Sonchon	선천 (宣川)			
167.5	10.1	167.0	10.1	Chonggang	청강 (淸江)	Tongrim	동림 (東林)	
178.3	10.8	177.8	10.8	Tongrim	동림 (東林)	Ch'aryŏngwan	차련관 (車輦館)	Cholsan Line
191.6	13.3	191.2	13.4	Yomju	염주 (鹽州)	Namsi	남시 (南市)	Paengma Line
↓	↓	~~195.5~~	~~4.3~~	Sujong	수정 (壽亭)			Closed 1944.
199.3	7.7	198.9	3.4	Naejung	내중 (內中)			
↓	↓	~~201.7~~	~~2.8~~	Tangryong	당령 (堂嶺)			Closed.
205.0	5.8	204.7	3.0	Ryongju	룡주 (龍州)			
210.1	5.1	209.8	5.1	Ryongchon	룡천 (龍川)	Yangsi	양시 (楊市)	Tasado Line
~~213.4~~	~~3.3~~	~~213.1~~	~~3.3~~	Ribam	리밤 (立岩)	Ibam	이밤 (立岩)	Closed
217.2	3.8	216.9	3.8	Ragwon	락원 (樂元)			
220.2	3.0	219.9	3.0	South Sinuiju (Namsinuiju)	남신의주 (南新義州)			Paengma Line, Tokhyon Line
225.4	5.2	225.1	5.2	Sinuiju Chongnyon	신의주청년 (新義州靑年)	Sinŭiju	신의주 (新義州)	Kangan Line
				Yalu River	압록강 (鴨綠江)			DPRK−PRC border Sino–Korean Friendship Bridge 조중우의교 (朝中友誼橋)
228.0	2.6	227.7	2.6	Dandong (China)	丹东	Andong	安東	China Railway Shendan Railway

== See also ==
- Transport in North Korea
- Korail
- Ryongchon disaster
