= Kangan Line =

Railway line in North Korea

Kang'an Line
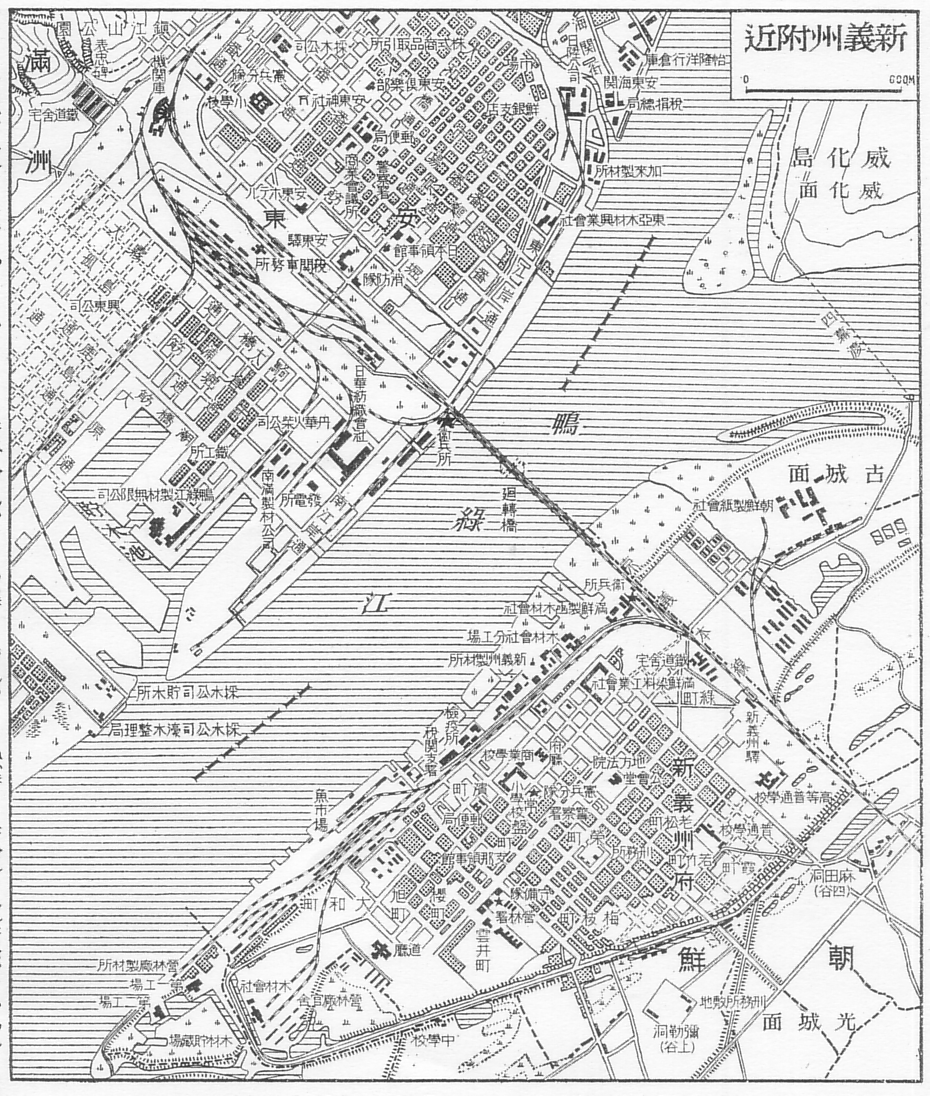
- Map of the area circa 1930; much of the current Kang'an Line can be seen along the south side of the river

Overview
- Native name: 강안선 (江岸線)
- Status: Operational
- Owner: Korean State Railway
- Locale: Sinŭiju-si, North P'yŏngan
- Termini: Sinŭiju Ch'ŏngnyŏn; Kang'an
- Stations: 2

Service
- Type: Heavy rail, Freight rail
- Operator(s): Korean State Railway

History
- Opened: 1911

Technical
- Line length: 1.8 km (1.1 mi)
- Number of tracks: Single track
Track gauge
1,435 mm (4 ft 8 1/2 in) standard gauge

- Kangan Line
- Hangul: 강안선
- Hanja: 江岸線
- RR: Ganganseon
- MR: Kangansŏn

The Kangan Line, also spelled Kang'an Line, is a non-electrified standard-gauge freight-only secondary line of the Korean State Railway located entirely within Sinŭiju-si, North P'yŏngan Province, North Korea, running from Sinŭiju on the P'yŏngŭi Line to Kang'an.

== History ==
For the original line's history and other information prior to 1945, see Gyeongui Line (1904–1945).

In 1911, the Yalu River Railway Bridge was completed across the Yalu River between Sinŭiju and Andong (now Dandong), China, connecting the Kyŏngŭi Line to the Anfeng Line of the South Manchuria Railway. Work to convert the Anfeng Line from 762 mm (2 ft 6.0 in) narrow gauge to standard gauge was completed at the same time, thus connecting the capitals of Korea and China with a continuous railway line via and Manchuria.

As a result, Sentetsu opened a new station in Sinŭiju (on the site of today's Sinŭiju Ch'ŏngnyŏn Station), with the original station, located 1.8 km (1.1 mi) northwest of the new station, being renamed Lower Sinŭiju Station.

On 1 November 1935, Sentetsu opened Pinjŏng Station between Sinŭiju and Lower Sinŭiju stations, but closed it again on 15 November 1941.

On 1 June 1936, Lower Sinŭiju station was renamed Sinŭiju Kang'an Station, and the 1.8 km (1.1 mi) line from Sinŭiju Station to Sinŭiju Kang'an Station was detached from the Kyŏngŭi Line to become the Kang'an Line.

Passenger service on the Kang'an Line was discontinued on 31 March 1943, with general (public) freight traffic being relocated from Sinŭiju Kang'an to Sinŭiju station on 20 December of that year.

== Services ==
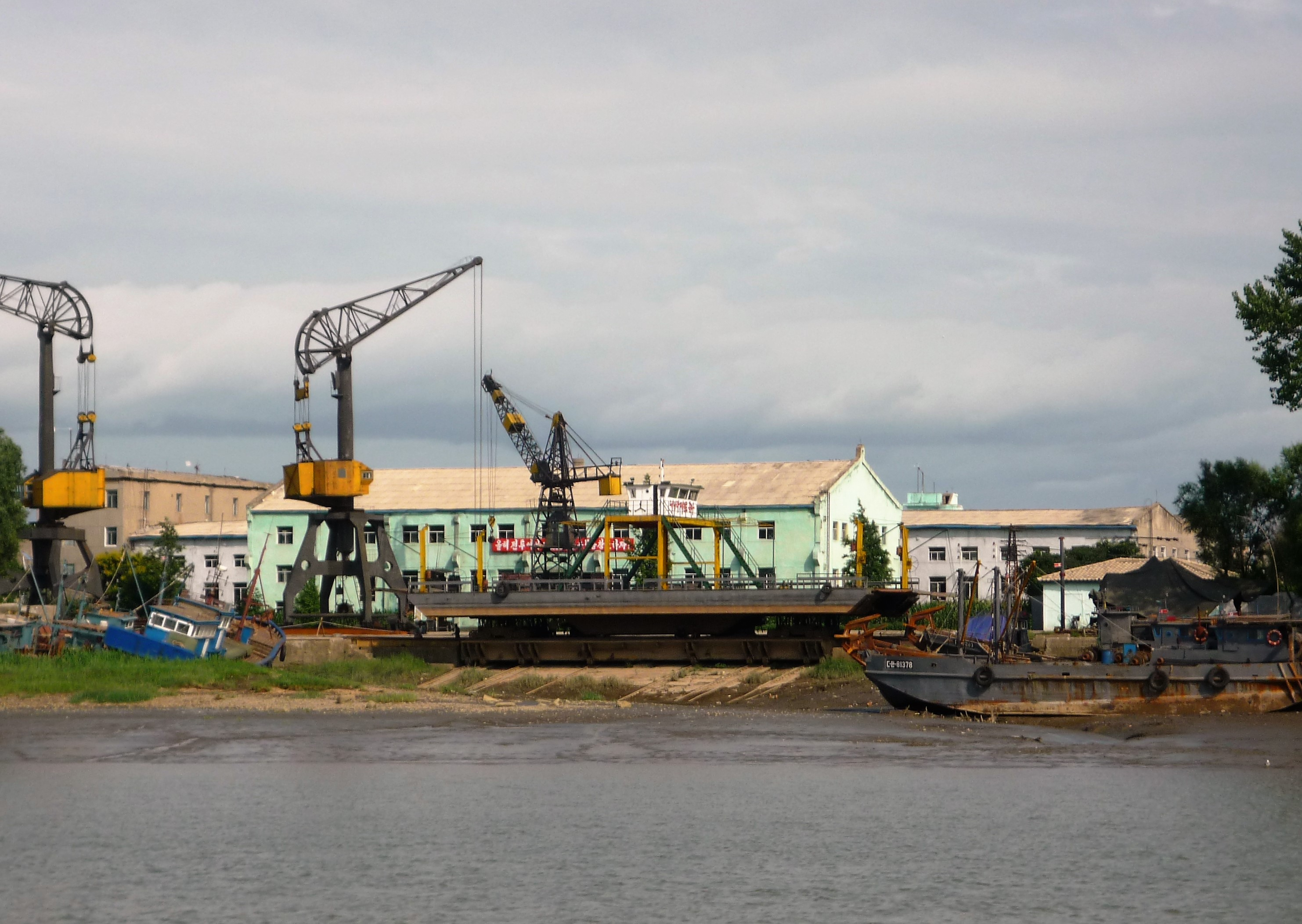
View of Sinŭiju Port from the river.

The Kang'an Line is used to serve the various industries in Sinŭiju, such as the Sinŭiju Streptomycin Factory and the Sinŭiju Chemical Fibre Complex (called the "Chōsen Paper Mills, Ltd." prior to 1945). There is also a large workshop for maintenance of passenger cars at Kang'an Station.

== Route ==
A yellow background in the "Distance" box indicates that section of the line is not electrified.

Distance (km)		Station Name		Former Name		
Total	S2S	Transcribed	Chosŏn'gŭl (Hanja)	Transcribed	Chosŏn'gŭl (Hanja)	Connections
0.0	0.0	Sinŭiju Ch'ŏngnyŏn	신의주청년 (新義州靑年)	Sinŭiju	신의주 (新義州)	P'yŏngŭi Line
~~1.1~~	~~1.1~~	Pinjŏng	빈정 (濱町)			Open 1 November 1935 to 15 November 1941.0
1.8	1.8	Kang'an	강안 (江岸)	Sinŭiju Hagŭpso (1911−1936); Sinŭiju Kang'an (1936−1945)	신의주하급소 (新義州荷扱所) 신의주강안 (新義州江岸)	
