= Sinuiju =

Sinŭiju 신의주시
- Municipal city

Korean transcription(s)
  - Chosŏn'gŭl: 신의주시
  - Hancha: 新義州市
  - Revised Romanization: Sinuiju-si
  - McCune-Reischauer: Sinŭiju-si
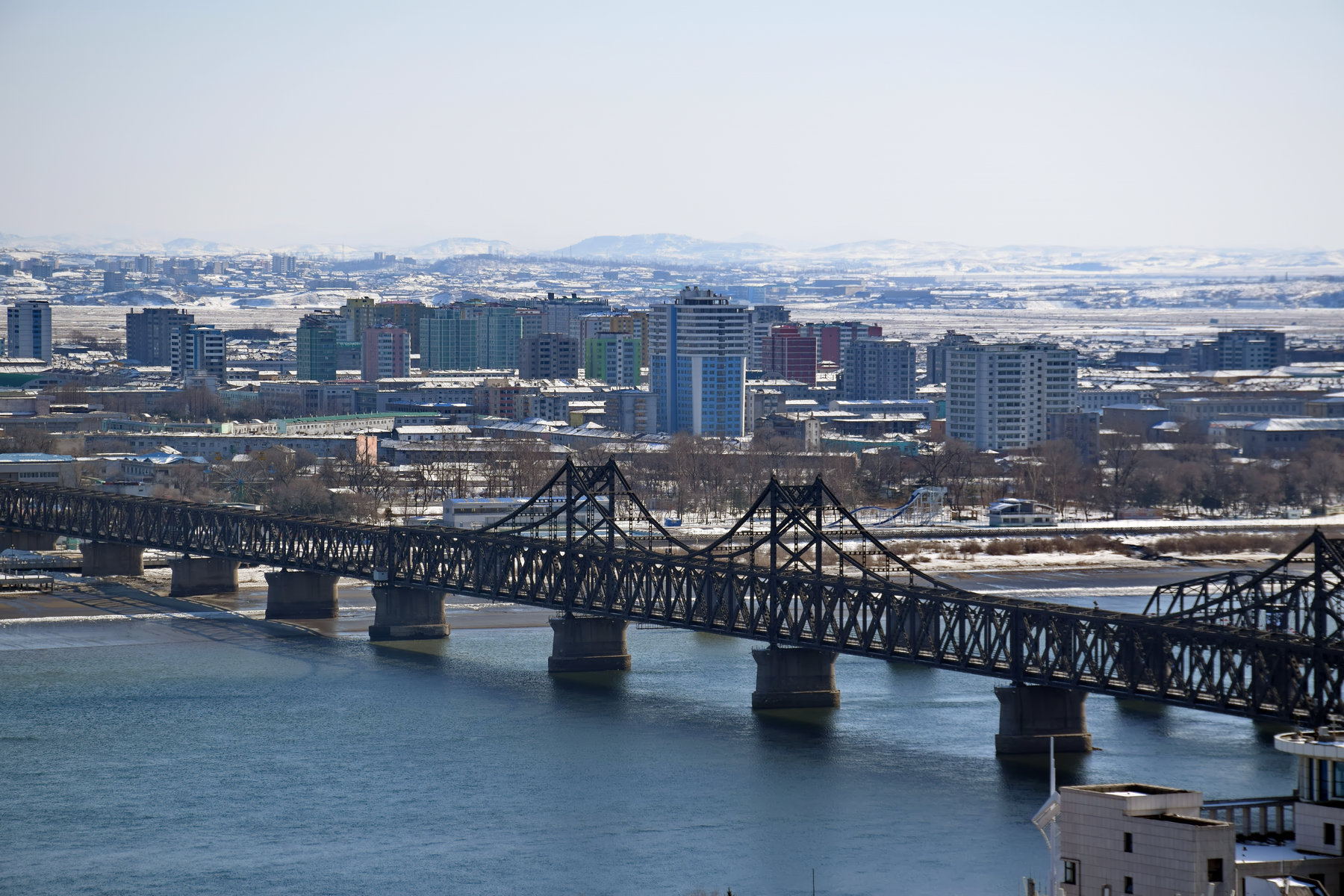
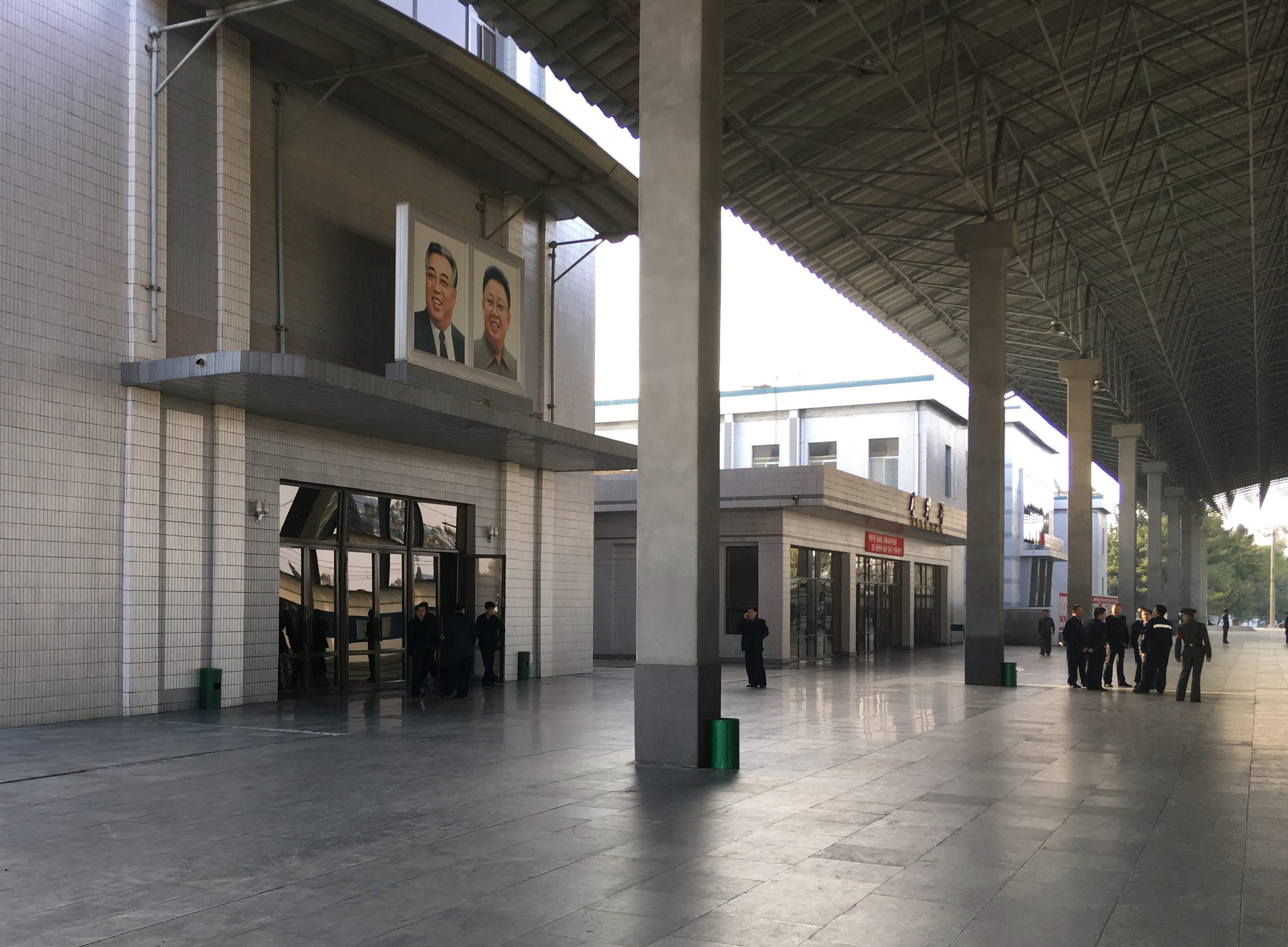
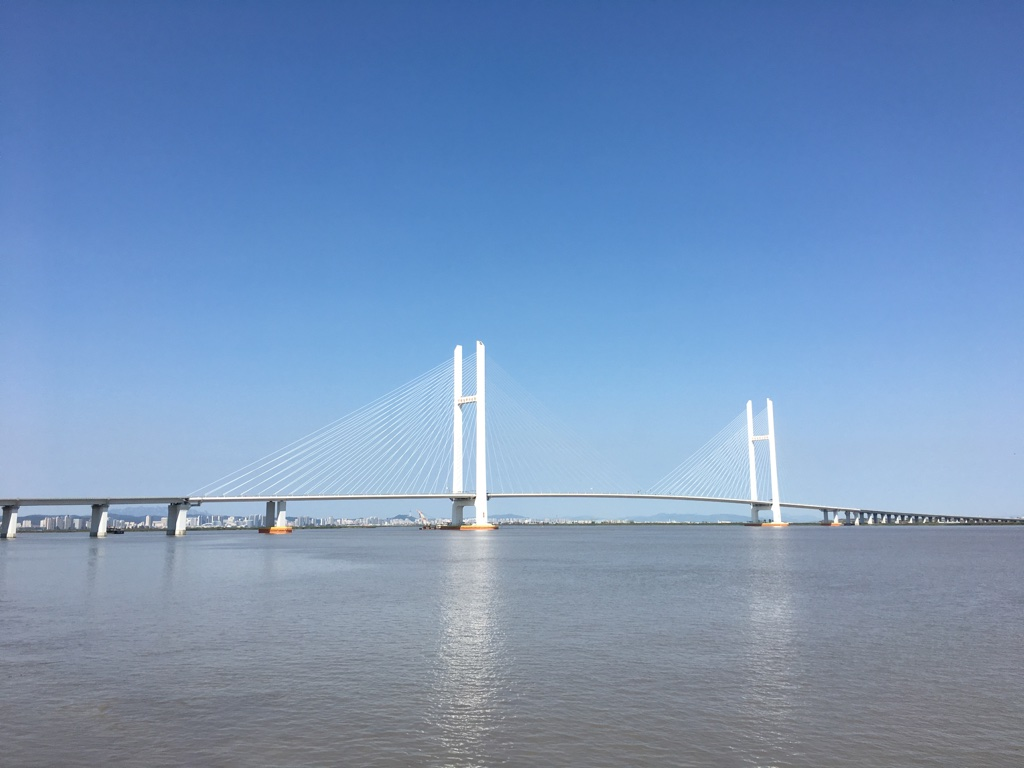
- Aerial view of Downtown Sinŭiju and Sino-Korean Friendship Bridge, from Dandong Sinŭiju Chongnyon station New Yalu River Bridge Skyline of Sinŭiju at night (in March 2026)
- Motto: The emblem Magnolia.
- Sinŭiju location within North Pyongan Province

- Location within North Korea
- Coordinates: 40°06′N 124°24′E
- Country: North Korea
- Province: North P'yŏngan
- Administrative divisions: 49 tong, 9 ri

Area
  - Total: 180 km^{2} (69 sq mi)

Population (2008)
  - Total: 359,341
  - Density: 2,000/km^{2} (5,200/sq mi)
  - Dialect: P'yŏngan
- Time zone: UTC+9 (Pyongyang Time)

Sinŭiju (Korean: 신의주시; MR: Sinŭiju-si; IPA: [sʰinɰid͡zu sʰi]) is a city in North Korea which faces Dandong, Liaoning, China, across the international border of the Yalu River. It is the capital of North P'yŏngan province. Part of the city is included in the planned Sinŭiju Special Administrative Region, which was proclaimed in 2002 and intended to experiment with introducing a market economy. In recent years the city has seen increasing tourism from China.

== Geography ==
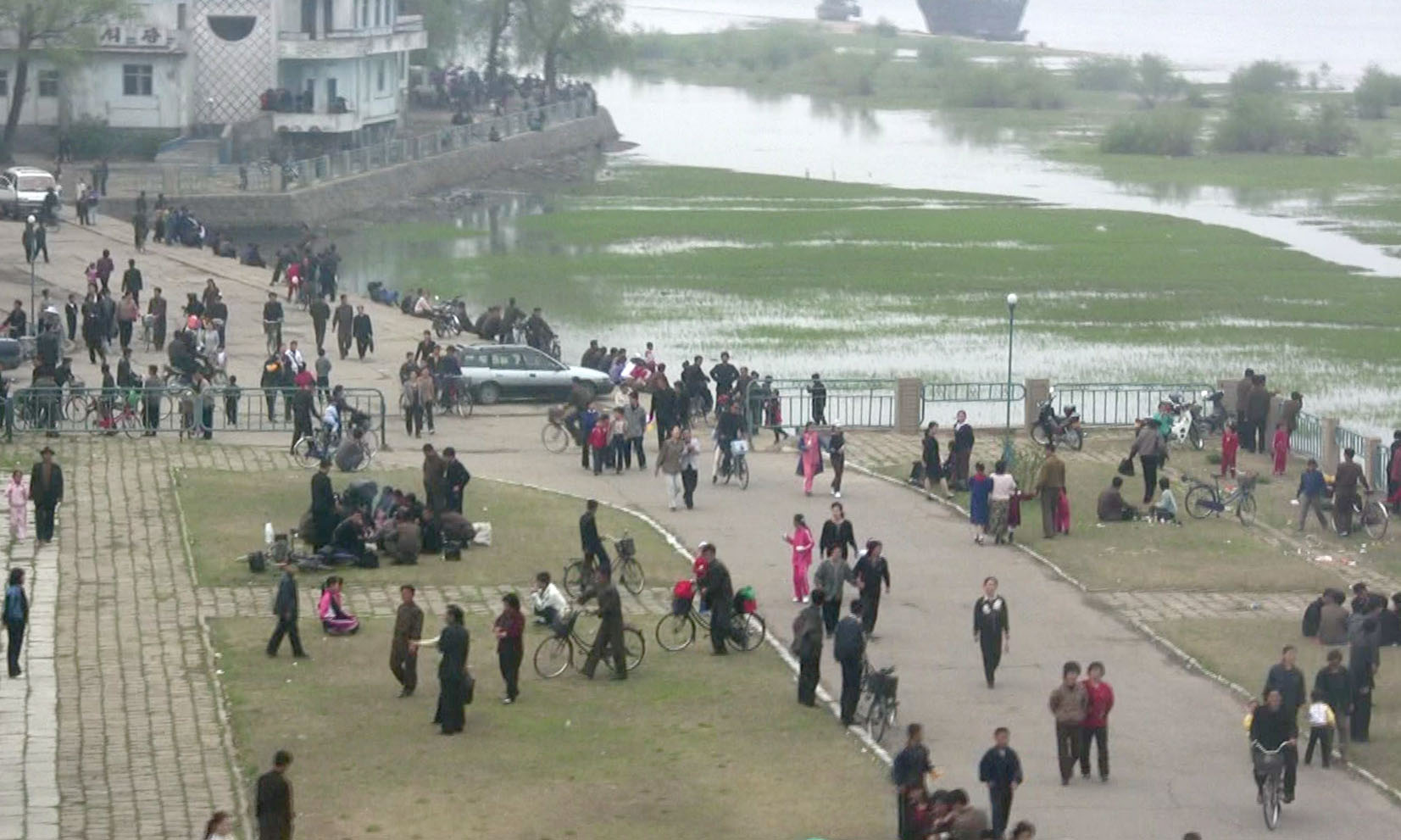
A park near the Sino-Korean Friendship Bridge

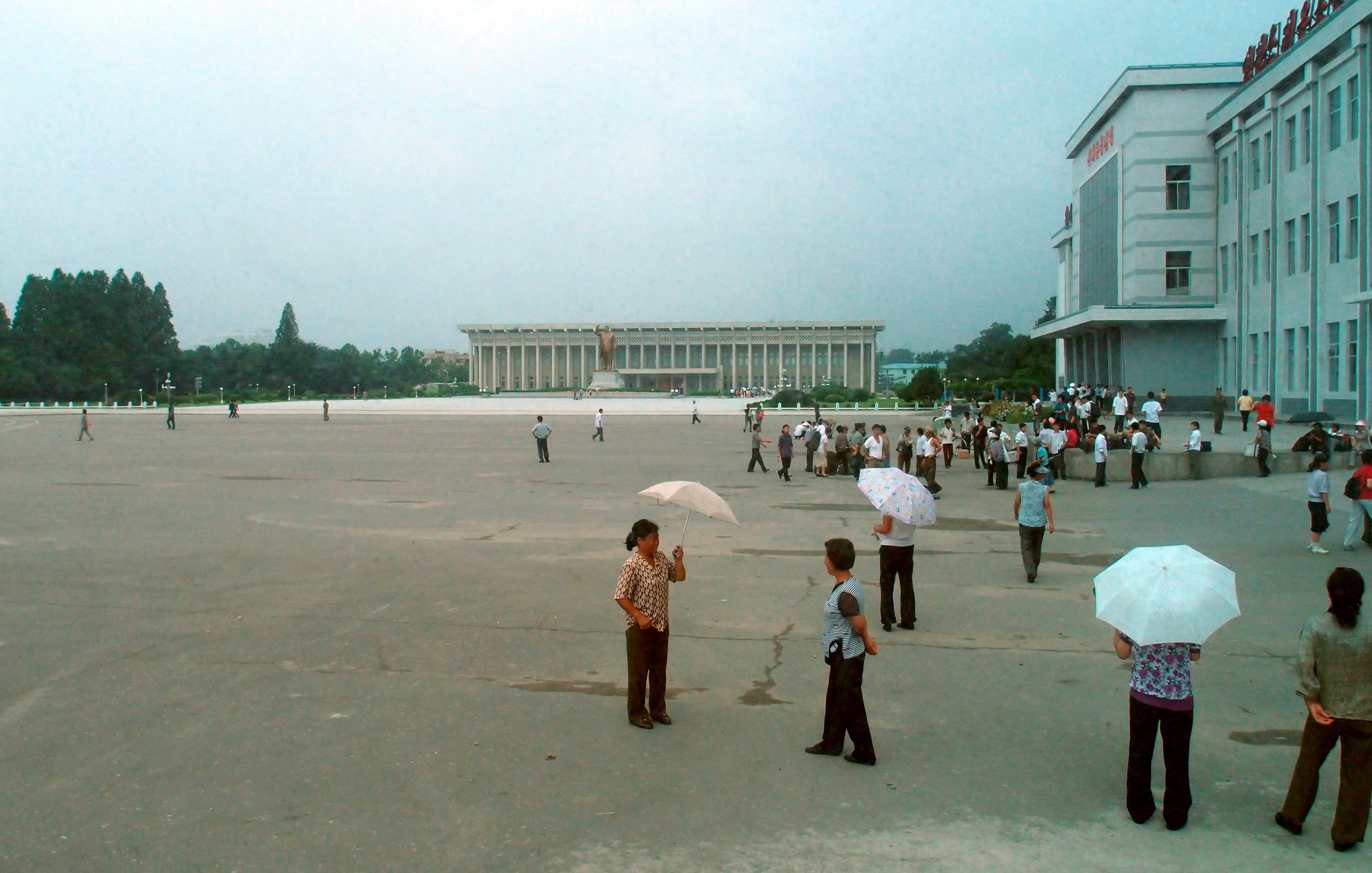
A large square in the center of Sinŭiju in August 2012, with a statue of Kim Il Sung

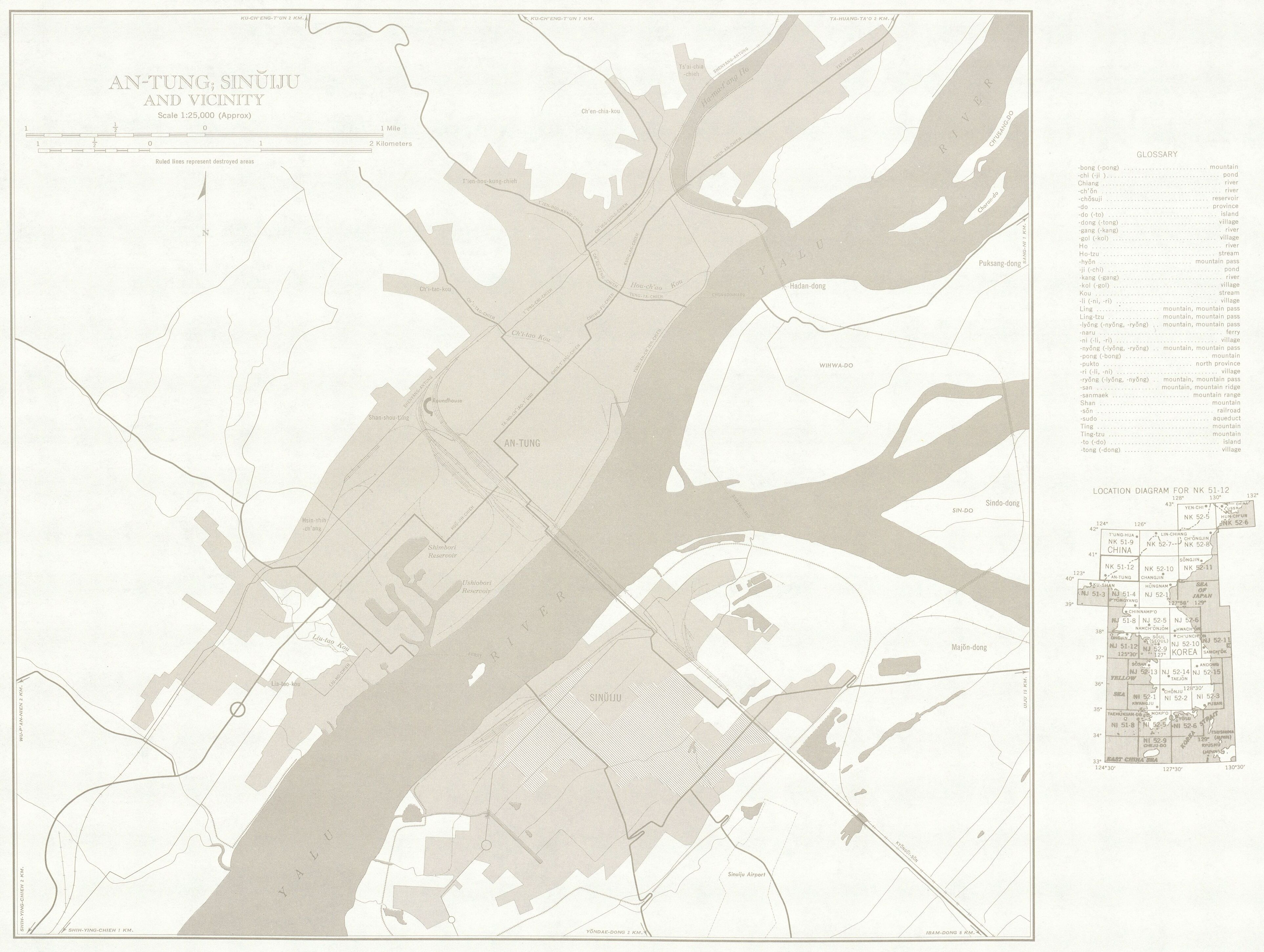
Map of Sinŭiju and Dandong (An-tung)

Sinŭiju is bordered by the Amnok River, and by P'ihyŏn and Ryongch'ŏn counties. The city's altitude is 1 metre (4 feet) above sea level. There are several islands at the mouth of the Amnok River – Wihwa-do, Rim-do, Ryuch'o-do and Tongryuch'o-do.

== Administrative divisions ==
Sinŭiju city is the heart of the Sinŭiju Special Administrative Region. The city is currently divided into 49 tong (neighbourhoods) and 9 ri (villages):

Name	Chosŏn'gŭl	Hancha
May 1-dong (O-il-dong)	5-1동 (오일동)	五一洞
Apkang-dong	압강동	鴨江洞
Chaeha-dong	채하동	彩霞洞
Chinsŏn 1-dong	친선1동	親善一洞
Chinsŏn 2-dong	친선2동	親善二洞
Ch'ŏngsong-dong	청송동	靑松洞
Haebang-dong	해방동	解放洞
Kaehyŏk-dong	개혁동	改革洞
Kosŏng-dong	고성동	古城洞
Kŭnhwa-dong	근화동	芹花洞
Majŏn-dong	마전동	麻田洞
Minpho-dong	민포동	敏浦洞
Namha-dong	남하동	南下洞
Namjung-dong	남중동	南中洞
Nammin-dong	남민동	南敏洞
Namsang-dong	남상동	南上洞
Namsŏ-dong	남서동	南西洞
Namsong-dong	남송동	南松洞
Paekun-dong	백운동	白雲洞
Paeksa-dong	백사동	白沙洞
Paekto-dong	백토동	白土洞
Pangjik-tong	방직동	紡織洞
Ponbu-dong	본부동	本部洞
P'anmun-dong	판문동	板門洞
P'ungsŏ 1-dong	풍서1동	豊西一洞
P'ungsŏ 2-dong	풍서2동	豊西二洞
P'yŏnghwa-dong	평화동	平和洞
Rakwŏn 1-dong	락원1동	樂園一洞
Rakwŏn 2-dong	락원2동	樂園二洞
Rakch'ŏng 1-dong	락청1동	樂清一洞
Rakchŏng 2-dong	락청2동	樂清二洞
Ryŏnsang 1-dong	련상1동	蓮上一洞
Ryŏnsang 2-dong	련상2동	蓮上二洞
Ryusang 1-dong	류상1동	柳上一洞
Ryusang 2-dong	류상2동	柳上二洞
Sinnam-dong	신남동	新南洞
Sinp'o-dong	신포동	新浦洞
Sinwŏn-dong	신원동	新元洞
Sŏkha 1-dong	석하1동	石下一洞
Sŏkha 2-dong	석하2동	石下二洞
Songhan-dong	송한동	送鷴洞
Sŏnsang-dong	선상동	仙上洞
Sumun-dong	수문동	水門洞
Tongha-dong	동하동	東下洞
Tongjung-dong	동중동	東中洞
Tongsang-dong	동상동	東上洞
Wai-dong	와이동	瓦耳洞
Yŏkchŏn-dong	역전동	驛前洞
Yŏnha-dong	연하동	煙下洞
Chungjae-ri	중재리	中斉里
Hadan-ri	하단리	下端里
Ryucho-ri	류초리	柳草里
Samgyo-ri	삼교리	三橋里
Samryong-ri	삼룡리	三龍里
Sangdan-ri	상단리	上端里
Sŏngsŏ-ri	성서리	城西里
Taji-ri	다지리	多智里
Tosŏng-ri	토성리	土城里

== History ==
Developed as a major settlement during Japanese colonial rule at the terminus of a railway bridge across the Amrok River, Sinŭiju is located 11 km (7 miles) south by southwest of Ŭiju, the old city from whose name Sinŭiju (meaning “New Ŭiju”) derives. As an open port, it grew commercially with the logging industry which uses the Amnok River to transport lumber. Additionally, a chemical industry developed after the hydroelectric Sup'ung Dam was built further up the river.

During the Korean War, after being driven from P'yŏngyang, Kim Il Sung and his government temporarily moved the capital to Sinŭiju – although as United Nations Command forces approached, the government again moved – this time to Kanggye. On 7 November 1950, the city sustained heavy damage during an aerial bombardment from the United States Air Force; 95 percent of the city was destroyed. However, the city has since been rebuilt.

In 2018, a master plan for the redevelopment of the city was unveiled and shown to Kim Jong Un, which would have featured many high rise buildings and parks, centered around the road leading to the statues of Kim Il Sung and Kim Jong Il. Ultimately, this plan has yet to be fulfilled, with the only major work completed being the repaving of roads leading to the statues and the red coloured, circular apartment building behind and the Sinŭiju Youth Open Air Theatre's completion, although the industrial areas in the city have seen some reconstruction. A 2023 study by the Korea Institute for National Unification argued that planning for the city had since broadened from the Sinŭiju district alone to also include South Sinŭiju district.

== Economy ==
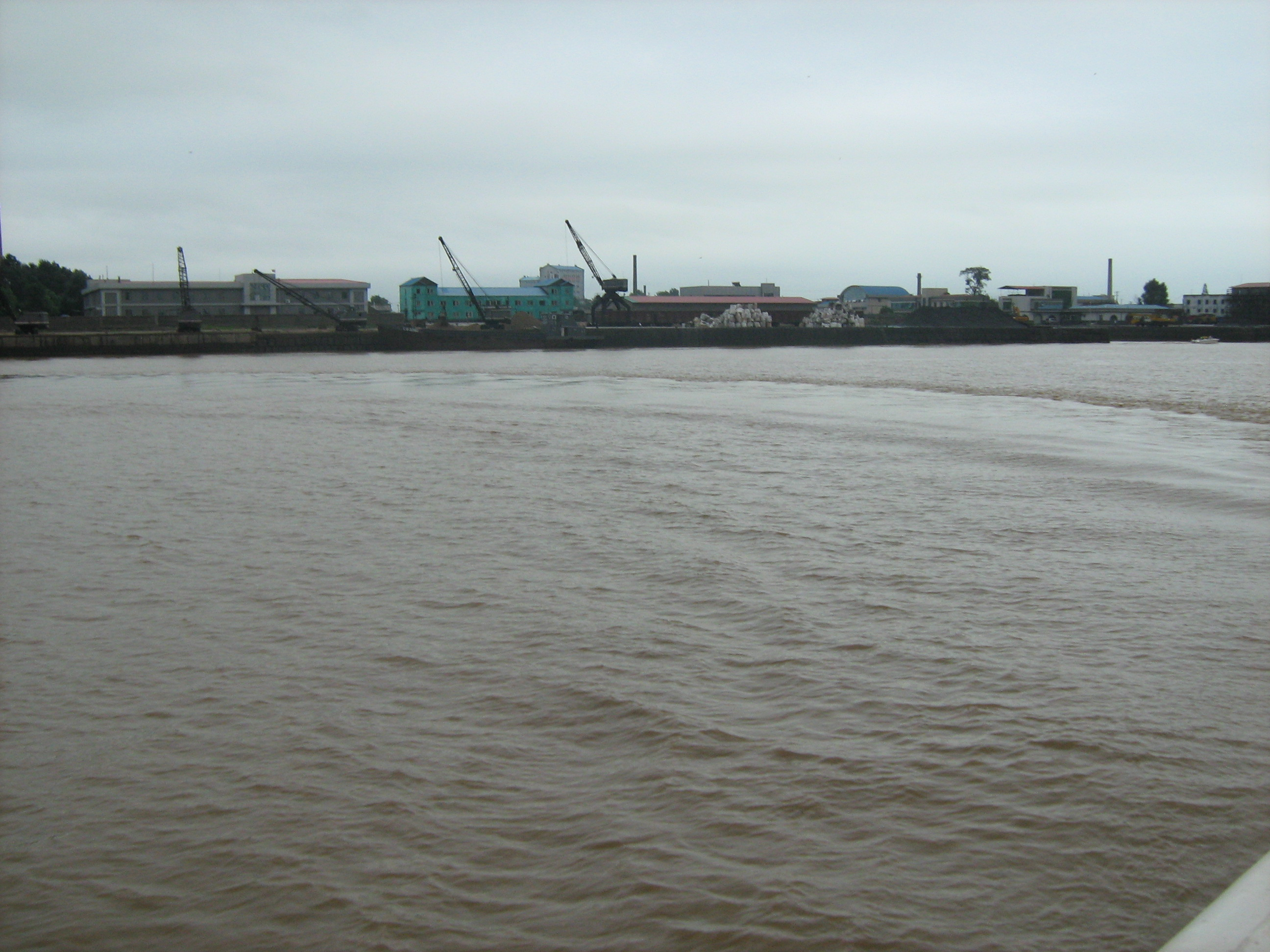
Waterfront on the Amnok River

An important light industry centre in North Korea, Sinŭiju has a plant manufacturing enamelled ironware as well as a textile mill, paper mill and an afforestation factory. Its southwest harbour has a shipyard, although the shipyard's main function is seemingly to dismantle ships for scrap metal and other usable materials rather than building new ships. The area has recycling plants which recycle a wide range of material, including products that are banned for recycling in China. The Sinŭiju Cosmetics Factory is located in South Sinŭiju (Namsinŭiju).

=== Trade with China ===
A substantial portion of North Korea's international trade, both legal and illegal, passes through Sinŭiju and Dandong, across the Yalu River.

=== Agriculture ===
In 2026, a major greenhouse complex called the Sinŭiju Combined Greenhouse Farm was completed on Wihwa Island. Spanning approximately 450 hectares, this complex was developed over an area that previously suffered from floods in 2024.

== Transportation ==
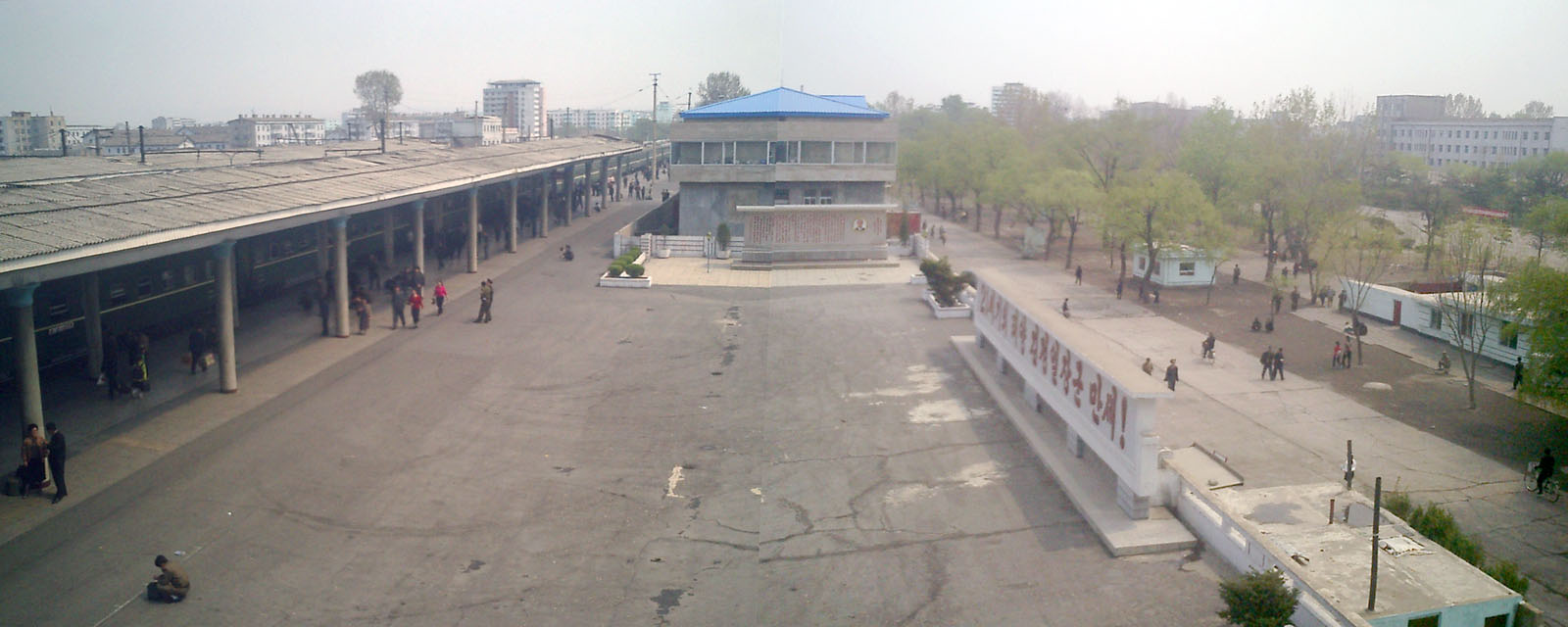
Sinŭiju Ch'ŏngnyŏn Railway Station

Sinŭiju can be reached from P'yŏngyang by air, railway, and road. It can be reached from Dandong in China by crossing the Amnok River by bridge or boat. Foreign tourists on excursion boats from Dandong are sometimes permitted to approach within a few meters of the city's coastline, as long as they do not land.

=== Air ===
Sinŭiju's airport has a single turf runway 03/21 measuring 991 by 61 metres (3,250 by 200 feet). Air Koryŏ operates passenger and cargo flights from P'yŏngyang.

=== Rail ===
Sinŭiju Ch'ŏngnyŏn Station is the northern terminus of the Korean State Railway's P'yŏngŭi Line from P'yŏngyang; the district is also served by several other stations on the P'yŏngŭi line, as well as the Tŏkhyŏn and Paengma lines. It is also connected with the Chinese city of Dandong in Liaoning Province in China by the Sino-Korean Friendship Bridge, which is 944 m (3,097 ft) long from end to end, and through the Manchuria Railway links up with the Trans-Siberian Railway. The factories of the city of Sinŭiju are provided with railway service via the Kang'an Line.

=== Urban transit ===
Sinŭiju has a trolleybus line that runs from the city centre to the railway station. It was reopened in October 2020 with new trolleybuses derived from the Pyongyang Chollima-321 trolleybus. It formerly had another line running from the Sinŭiju Chongnyon Station to Ragwon Machine Complex that closed between 2005 and 2009 with the reconstruction of the highway with a shifted alignment.

== Climate ==
Sinŭiju has a monsoonal humid continental climate (Köppen Dwa) with hot, humid and stormy summers and cold, dry winters with little snowfall.

Climate data for Sinuiju (1991–2020 normals, extremes 1957–present)
Month	Jan	Feb	Mar	Apr	May	Jun	Jul	Aug	Sep	Oct	Nov	Dec	Year
Record high °C (°F)	9.2 (48.6)	15.5 (59.9)	22.0 (71.6)	28.4 (83.1)	32.0 (89.6)	37.0 (98.6)	36.9 (98.4)	38.5 (101.3)	33.0 (91.4)	28.9 (84.0)	23.1 (73.6)	13.9 (57.0)	38.5 (101.3)
Mean daily maximum °C (°F)	−0.8 (30.6)	2.9 (37.2)	8.8 (47.8)	16.1 (61.0)	22.0 (71.6)	25.9 (78.6)	28.3 (82.9)	29.2 (84.6)	25.6 (78.1)	18.3 (64.9)	8.7 (47.7)	0.5 (32.9)	15.5 (59.9)
Daily mean °C (°F)	−6.2 (20.8)	−2.8 (27.0)	3.2 (37.8)	10.1 (50.2)	16.2 (61.2)	20.9 (69.6)	24.1 (75.4)	24.5 (76.1)	19.7 (67.5)	12.2 (54.0)	3.6 (38.5)	−4.2 (24.4)	10.1 (50.2)
Mean daily minimum °C (°F)	−10.3 (13.5)	−7.2 (19.0)	−1.2 (29.8)	5.4 (41.7)	11.5 (52.7)	17.0 (62.6)	21.2 (70.2)	21.1 (70.0)	15.1 (59.2)	7.5 (45.5)	−0.4 (31.3)	−8.0 (17.6)	6.0 (42.8)
Record low °C (°F)	−27.3 (−17.1)	−26.0 (−14.8)	−18.9 (−2.0)	−5.0 (23.0)	−2.6 (27.3)	3.0 (37.4)	10.7 (51.3)	10.0 (50.0)	2.8 (37.0)	−5.3 (22.5)	−15.0 (5.0)	−22.8 (−9.0)	−27.3 (−17.1)
Average precipitation mm (inches)	5.9 (0.23)	14.9 (0.59)	20.3 (0.80)	53.7 (2.11)	85.0 (3.35)	122.6 (4.83)	251.9 (9.92)	241.3 (9.50)	95.7 (3.77)	78.8 (3.10)	37.2 (1.46)	13.6 (0.54)	1,020.9 (40.19)
Average precipitation days (≥ 0.1 mm)	2.1	3.2	3.8	6.4	7.7	9.8	12.6	10.4	5.7	5.6	5.2	4.0	76.5
Average snowy days	3.5	3.1	2.1	0.3	0.1	0.0	0.0	0.0	0.0	0.1	1.9	4.4	15.5
Average relative humidity (%)	60.2	59.9	61.8	63.7	70.0	78.0	84.2	81.7	73.7	68.0	65.6	62.5	69.1
Mean monthly sunshine hours	199	195	227	228	237	207	163	200	220	208	169	172	2,425
Source 1: Korea Meteorological Administration
Source 2: Deutscher Wetterdienst (sun, 1961–1990), (Note: Station ID for Sinuiju is 47035 Use this station ID to locate the sunshine duration) Meteo Climat (extremes), Extreme Temperature Around The World

== Places of interest ==
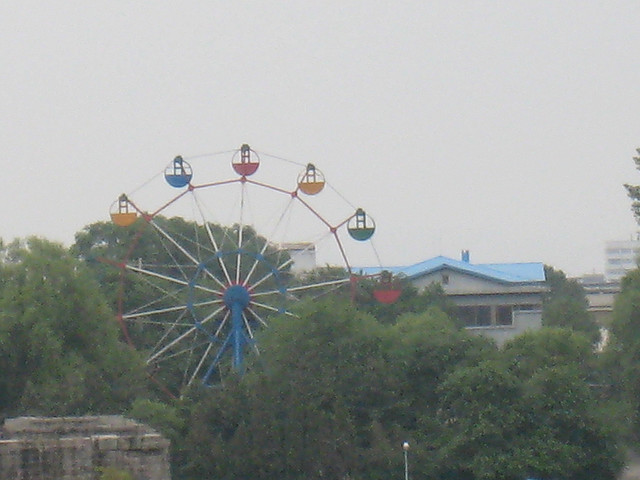
Ferris wheel in Sinŭiju

Facilities in Sinŭiju include Sinŭiju High School, Sinŭiju Commercial High School, Eastern Middle School, Sinŭiju Light Industry University, Sinŭiju University of Medicine and the Sinŭiju University of Education. Scenic sites include the Tonggun Pavilion, Waterfall, and Hot Springs.

There also is a Ferris wheel overlooking the Yalu River, reportedly broken.

== Notable people ==
- Sohn Kee-chung, South Korean Olympic athlete and long-distance runner
- Suh Chong Kang, South Korean martial artist
- Yi Sung-sun, South Korean street knight
- Yushoku Cho, Japanese speed skater

== See also ==
- List of cities in North Korea
- Geography of North Korea
- Sinŭiju Incident
- Sinŭiju North Korean Leader's Residence
