= Pyongyang station =

Central railway station of Pyongyang, North Korea

P'yŏngyang 평양
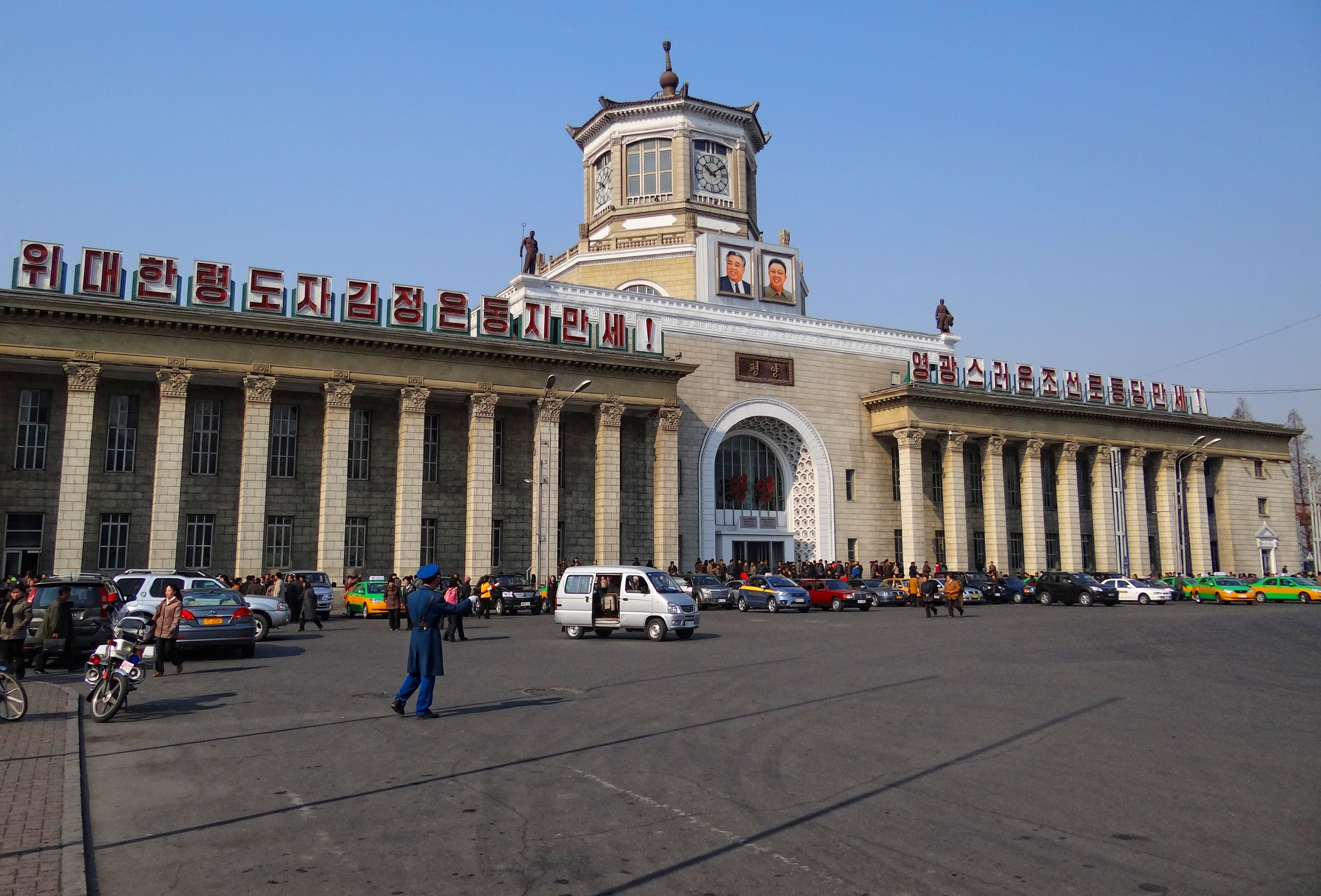
- Street facade of the railway station

Korean name
- Hangul: 평양역
- Hanja: 平壤驛
- RR: Pyeongyang-yeok
- MR: P'yŏngyang-yŏk

General information
- Location: Yŏkchŏn-dong, Chung-guyŏk, P'yŏngyang; North Korea
- Coordinates: 39.0050°N 125.7365°E
- Owner: Korean State Railway
- Platforms: 5
- Tracks: 6
- Connections: Ch'ŏllima Line (Yonggwang Station); Line 1; Trolleybus line 1, 2, 10

History
- Opened: 1906
- Rebuilt: 1958
- Original company: Chosen Government Railway

Services
Preceding station	Korean State Railway	Following station
Terminus	P'yŏngbu Line	Taedonggang towards Kaesŏng
Taedonggang towards Kujang Ch'ŏngnyŏn	P'yŏngdŏk Line	Terminus
Terminus	P'yŏngnam Line	Pot'onggang towards Namp'o
Terminus	P'yŏngra Line	West P'yŏngyang towards Rajin
West P'yŏngyang towards Dandong (China)	P'yŏngŭi Line	Terminus
Location

Pyongyang station (Korean: 평양역) is the central railway station of Pyongyang, North Korea. It is located in Yŏkchŏn-dong, Chung-guyŏk.

== Main information ==
The station is the start of the Pyongbu and Pyongŭi lines, which were adjusted from the Kyongbu and Kyongui lines used before the division of Korea to accommodate the shift of the capital from Seoul to Pyongyang. The P'yŏngŭi Line runs from Pyongyang to Sinuiju, while the Pyongbu Line theoretically runs through Seoul and ends at Busan; in practice, however, the line ends at Kaesŏng. It is also served by the Pyongnam Line, which runs from Pyongyang to Nampo, as well as the Pyongdok Line running from Pyongyang to Kujang.

== Connections ==
Pyongyang station is the main station in North Korea and it connects most of the cities of the country: Chongju, Sinuiju, Namp'o, Sariwŏn, Kaesŏng, Wŏnsan, Hamhŭng and Rason. Beside domestic routes, international trains link Pyongyang with the Chinese capital Beijing four times weekly (24 hours) and the Chinese city of Dandong, located on the adjacent bank of the Yalu River. Trains do connect Pyongyang with Moscow, however due to chronic delays these are off-limits to foreigners. There are presently no scheduled trains to Seoul (about 250 km (155 mi) away), due to the separation of the two Koreas.

Local transit connections can be made at the station via Pyongyang Metro's Yongwang station (on the Ch'ŏllima Line), by Line 1 of the P'yŏngyang tram system and Pyongyang trolleybus lines 1, 2 and 10, with Pyongyang station being the terminus of all three lines.

== Structure ==
The original station was constructed in the 1920s by the Empire of Japan who occupied Korea at the time, the original architectural style being akin to the original Seoul station built at a similar time, with the two cities once linked together. During the Korean War, the original structure was destroyed and later on rebuilt in 1958 in the style of socialist architecture. The station presently has three floors above ground level as well as a basement. The ground level houses a ticket desk exclusively for government employees. At the first floor there is a waiting room, toilets, a ticket desk and access to the trains. At the second floor there are offices for the staff and at the third the office of the station master. There are five platforms, with number 1 being the most spacious.

== Speaker system ==
At 6:00 AM every morning, a rendition of "Where Are You, Dear General?" is played over a speaker system at the station. It is widely believed the song may be intended as a morning alarm call for residents of Pyongyang.

== Gallery ==
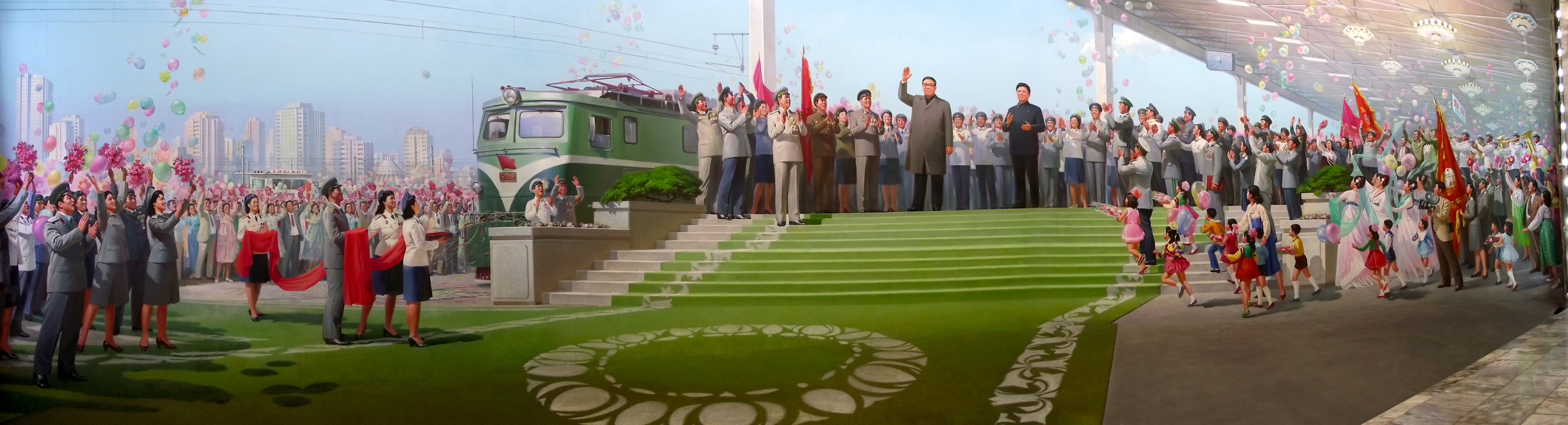
Pyongyang station in a painting
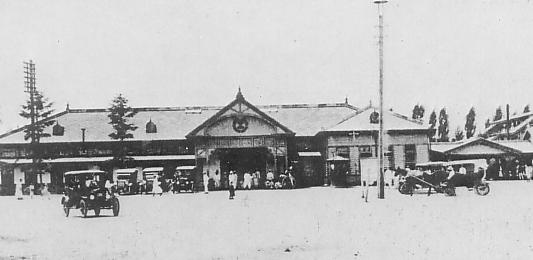
The station in the 1920s

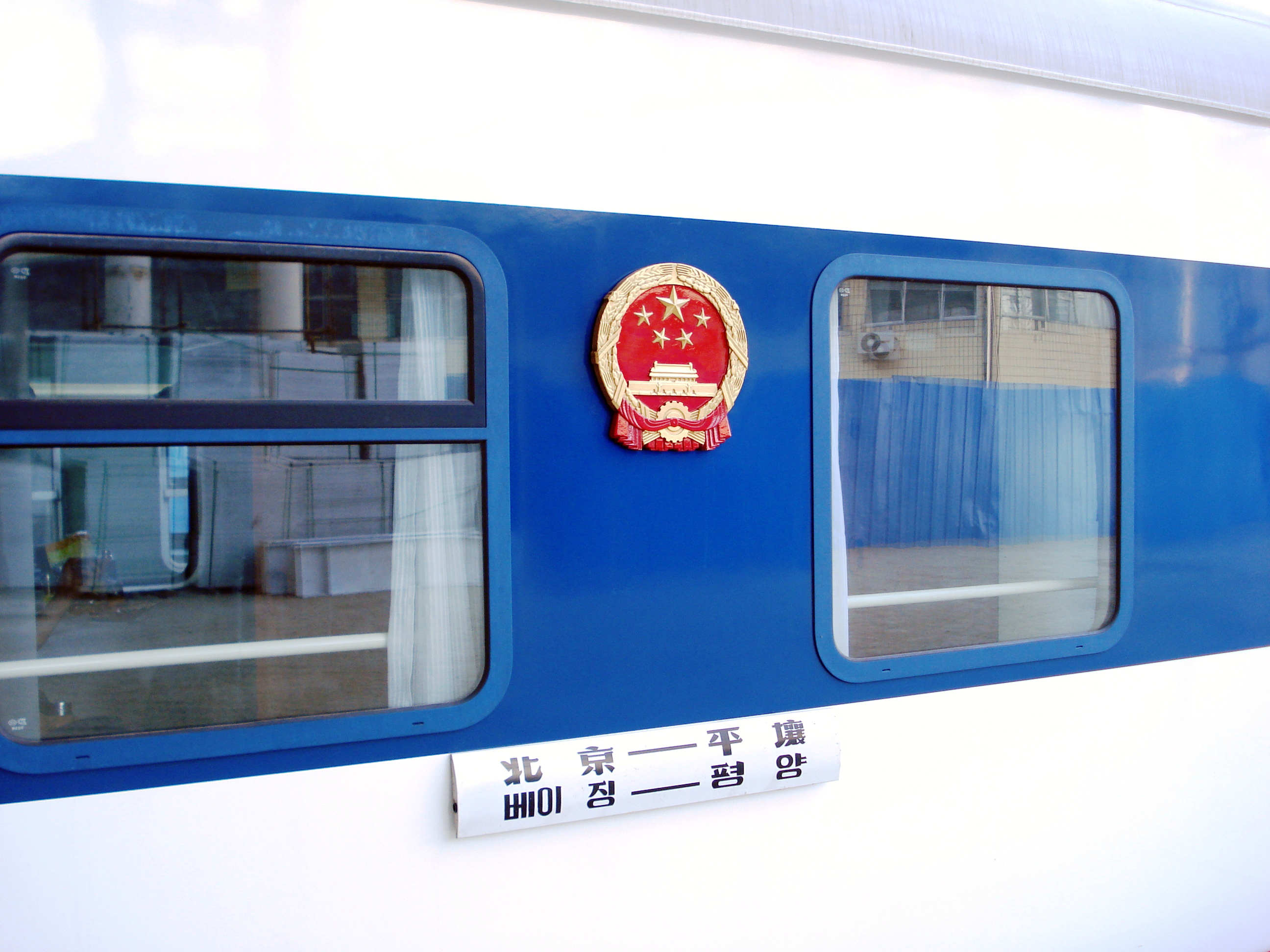
A Beijing–Pyongyang train in the station (2010)
