= Heianhoku Province =

1910–1945 province of Korea under Japan

Heianhoku Province 平安北道
- Former province of Korea, Empire of Japan
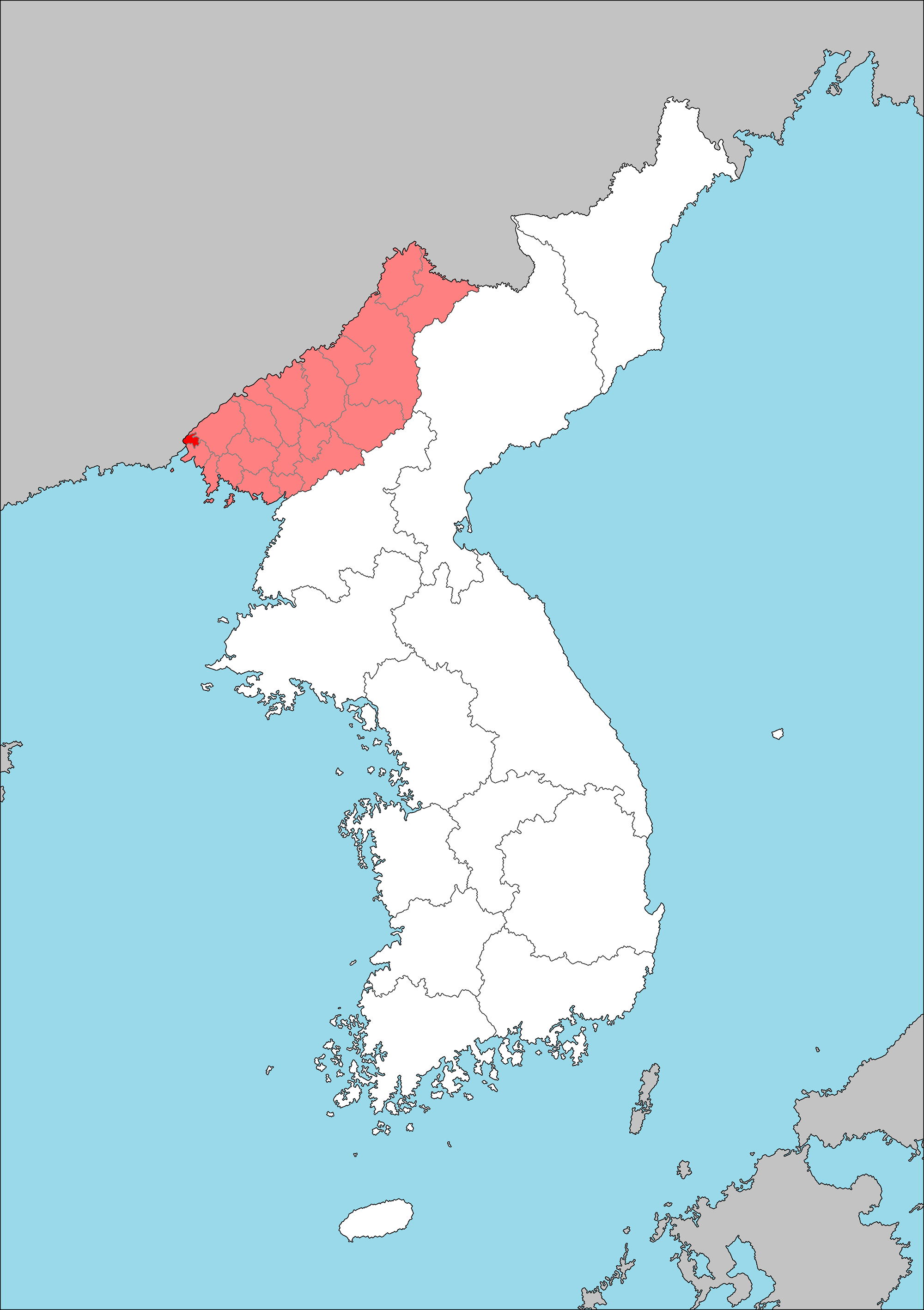
- Capital: Shingishū
- History
  - Established: 29 August 1910
  - Disestablished: 15 August 1945
- Today part of: North Korea

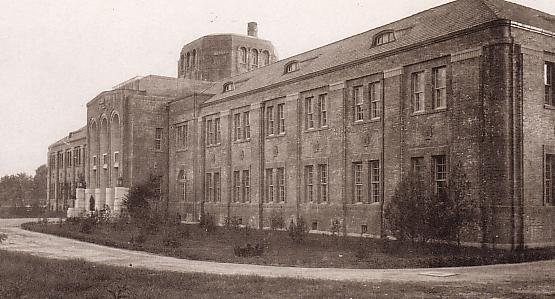
Heian-hoku Provincial Office

Heianhoku-dō (平安北道; Korean: 평안북도), alternatively Heianhoku Province or North Heian Province, was a province of Korea under Japanese rule. Its capital was at Shingishū (Sinuiju). The province consisted of modern-day North Pyongan Province, North Korea.

== Population ==
Number of people by nationality according to the 1936 census:

- Overall population: 1,620,882 people
  - Japanese: 22,363 people
  - Koreans: 1,578,605 people
  - Other: 19,914 people

== Administrative divisions ==
=== Cities ===
Emblem of Shingishū

- Shingishū (신의주, capital)

=== Counties ===
- Gishū(의주)
- Ryūsen(용천)
- Tetsuzan(철산)
- Sensen(선천)
- Teishū(정주)
- Hakusen(박천)
- Neihen(영변)
- Unzan(운산)
- Taisen(태천)
- Kijō(구성)
- Sakushū(삭주)
- Shōjō(창성)
- Hekidō(벽동)
- Sozan(초산)
- Igen(의원)
- Kisen(희천)
- Kōkai(강계)
- Jijō(자성)
- Kōshō(후창)

== Provincial governors ==
Family Register	Name	Kanji Notation	Term of Office	Notes
Naichijin	Kawakami Tsuneo	川上 常郎	October 1, 1910 – November 14, 1916	Chief Minister of Heianhoku
Naichijin	Fujikawa Risaburo	藤川 利三郎	November 14, 1916 – September 26, 1919	Chief Minister; from August 1919, Governor of Heianhoku
Naichijin	Iio Tojiro	飯尾 藤次郎	September 26, 1919 – February 24, 1923	
Naichijin	Ikuta Seizaburo	生田 清三郎	February 24, 1923 – June 15, 1925	
Naichijin	Tani Takima	谷 多喜磨	June 15, 1925 – November 28, 1929	
Naichijin	Ishikawa Tomori	石川 登盛	November 28, 1929 – December 13, 1932	
Naichijin	Hashi Morisada	土師 盛貞	December 13, 1932 – April 1, 1935	
Naichijin	Ōtake Jūrō	大竹 十郎	April 1, 1935 – May 21, 1936	
Naichijin	Miza Sasuga	美座 流石	May 21, 1936 – March 15, 1939	
Naichijin	Nishimoto Keizō	西本 計三	March 15, 1939 – September 2, 1940	
Naichijin	Kō Yasuhiko	高 安彦	September 2, 1940 – November 19, 1941	
Naichijin	Shiraishi Kōjirō	白石 光治郎	November 19, 1941 – July 17, 1943	
Naichijin	Nobuhara Satoru	信原 聖	July 17, 1943 – March 28, 1945	
Naichijin	Yamaji Yasuyuki	山地 靖之	March 28, 1945 – August 15, 1945	Tenure terminated with the end of the Japanese rule

== See also ==
- Provinces of Korea
- Governor-General of Chōsen
- Administrative divisions of Korea
