= Taehung County =

Taehŭng County 대흥군
- County

Korean transcription(s)
  - Chosŏn'gŭl: 대흥군
  - Hancha: 大興郡
  - McCune–Reischauer: Taehŭng-gun
  - Revised Romanization: Daeheung-gun
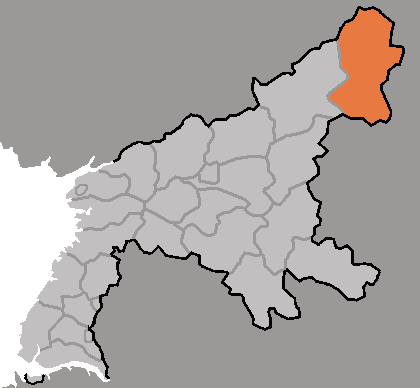
- Map of South Pyongan showing the location of Taehung
- Country: North Korea
- Province: South P'yŏngan
- Administrative divisions: 1 ŭp, 1 rodongjagu, 16 ri

Area
  - Total: 1,224 km^{2} (473 sq mi)

Population (2008)
  - Total: 32,915

Taehŭng County is a kun, or county, in the northeastern corner of South P'yŏngan province, North Korea. It is bordered to the north by Ryongrim and Changjin, to the east by Yŏnggwang and Hamju, to the south by Yodŏk and Chŏngp'yŏng, and to the west by Nyŏngwŏn and Tongsin. It is drained by the Taedong River, which rises in the north part of the county before flowing west into Yŏngwŏn.

The terrain of Taehŭng is higher and more mountainous than any other part of South P'yŏngan. Three mountain ranges, the Rangrim, Myohyang, and Puktaebong, pass through the county. The highest of the many peaks is Tongdaesan, at 2,094 meters above sea level.

Local agriculture is dominated by dry-field farming, with maize the chief crop. Lumber is sent down the Taedong River for processing. There are subterranean reserves of tungsten, gold, copper, and zinc. There are no railroads, but the county is served by roads which connect it to neighbouring towns via the mountain passes.

== Administrative divisions ==
Taehung County is divided into one town (ŭp), one workers' district (rodongjagu) and 16 villages (ri).

	Chosŏn'gŭl	Hancha
Taehŭng-ŭp	대흥읍	大興邑
Kyŏngsu-rodongjagu	경수로동자구	鯨水勞動者區
Ch'anghyŏl-li	창현리	昌峴里
Huksu-ri	흑수리	黑水里
Illyong-ri	인룡리	仁龍里
Kŭmsŏng-ri	금성리	錦城里
Kwangt'ong-ri	광통리	廣通里
Munsam-ri	문삼리	文三里
Pokhŭng-ri	복흥리	福興里
P'yŏnghwa-ri	평화리	平和里
Rangrim-ri	랑림리	狼林里
Ryongp'yŏng-ri	룡평리	龍坪里
Sinnam-ri	신남리	新南里
Sobaeng-ri	소백리	小白里
Taedong-ri	대동리	大同里
Tohŭng-ri	도흥리	都興里
Tŏkhŭng-ri	덕흥리	德興里
Unhŭng-ri	운흥리	雲興里

== See also ==
- List of secondary subdivisions of North Korea
- Geography of North Korea
