= Usi County =

Coordinates: 40.679°N 125.669°E

Usi County 우시군
- County

Korean transcription(s)
  - Hanja: 雩時郡
  - McCune–Reischauer: Usi-gun
  - Revised Romanization: Usi-gun
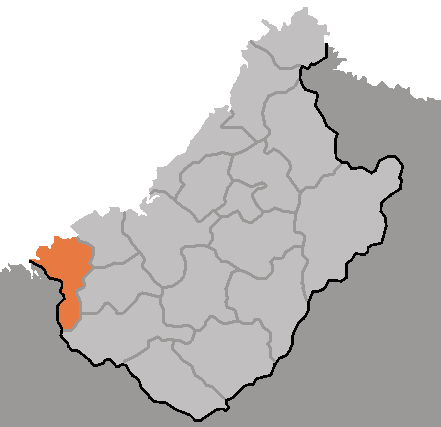
- Map of Changang showing the location of Usi
- Country: North Korea
- Province: Chagang Province
- Administrative divisions: 1 ŭp, 1 workers' district, 22 ri

Area
  - Total: 665 km^{2} (257 sq mi)

Population (2008 census)
  - Total: 42,919
  - Density: 64.5/km^{2} (167/sq mi)

Usi is a kun, or county, in westernmost Chagang Province, North Korea. It looks across the Yalu River into the People's Republic of China. Within North Korea, it borders Chosan and Kopung to the east, Songwon to the south, and North Pyongan Province's Pyoktong county to the west. Originally part of Pyoktong, it was made a separate county in 1952 as part of a general reorganization of local government; in 1954, it was transferred from North Pyongan to Chagang.

There are no railroads in Usi, but it is connected by road to the neighboring districts of Chosan and Pyoktong, and beyond Pyoktong to Sinuiju. In addition, the Yalu is used for transportation. The stretch of the Yalu in Usi is part of the massive "Lake Supung", North Korea's largest reservoir.

The Yalu valley is farmed for rice, while the upland regions produce maize, potatoes, and sesame. There is little manufacturing. The county's Kaha-ri district is known for its medicinal waters.

== Administrative divisions ==
Usi county is divided into one town (ŭp), one worker's district (rodongjagu), and 22 villages (ri).

	Chosŏn'gŭl	Hancha
Usi-ŭp	우시읍	雩時邑
Palŭl-lodongjagu	발은노동자구	發銀勞動者區
Kŭmsŏng-ri	금성리	金城里
Kŭmyang-ri	금양리	金陽里
Usang-ri	우상리	雩上里
Ujung-ri	우중리	雩中里
Siha-ri	시하리	時下里
Sisang-ri	시상리	時上里
P'yŏlha-ri	별하리	別下里
P'yŏlsang-ri	별상리	別上里
Kaha-ri	가하리	加下里
Kajung-ri	가중리	加中里
Kasang-ri	가상리	加上里
P'yŏngsang-ri	평상리	平上里
Taep'yŏng-ri	대평리	大平里
Sangp'yŏng-ri	상평리	上坪里
Hap'yŏng-ri	하평리	下坪里
Puhŭng-ri	부흥리	富興里
Pukha-ri	북하리	北下里
Puksang-ri	북상리	北上里
Osang-ri	오상리	吾上里
Oha-ri	오하리	吾下里
Ryonghae-ri	룡해리	龍海里
Hachang-ri	하창리	下倉里

== See also ==
- Geography of North Korea
- Administrative divisions of North Korea
