= Songwon County =

Songwon County 송원군
- County

Korean transcription(s)
  - Hanja: 松源郡
  - McCune-Reischauer: Songwŏn kun
  - Revised Romanization: Songwon-gun
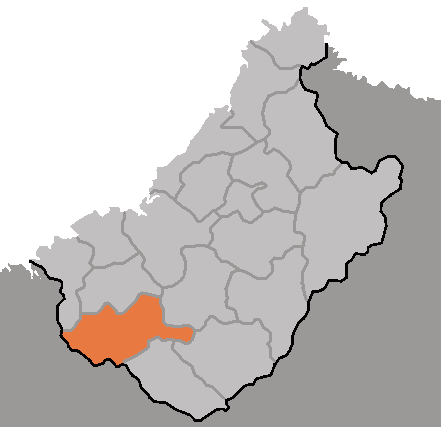
- Map of Chagang showing the location of Songwon
- Country: North Korea
- Province: Chagang Province
- Administrative divisions: 1 ŭp, 12 ri

Area
  - Total: 1,080 km^{2} (420 sq mi)

Population (2008)
  - Total: 38,051
  - Density: 35.2/km^{2} (91.3/sq mi)

Songwŏn County is a kun, or county, in southwestern Chagang province, North Korea. It borders Usi and Kop'ung counties to the north, Tongsin to the east, and Hŭich'ŏn to the south, as well as North P'yŏngan's Tongchang county to the west. Originally part of Chosan, it was established as a separate county in 1949, when Chagang province was created.

The Ch'ongch'ŏn and Chungman Rivers both flow through Songwŏn. The terrain is mountainous, with the Pinandŏk and Chogyuryong Mountains rising in the county's south. The highest peaks are in the north; the tallest is Koambong, 1,744 m above sea level. The climate is continental but relatively wet; the frost begins in early October and lifts in late April.

The chief local industry is logging, with 93% of the county covered by forestland. Livestock, particularly cattle, are also raised, and crops including maize and rice are grown. A 67 km² reservoir has been built across the Chungman (completed in 1980), and is used for hydroelectric power.

== Administrative divisions ==
Songwŏn County is divided into 1 ŭp (town) and 12 ri (villages):

- Songwŏn-ŭp
- Chŏnch'ang-ri
- Ch'angdŏng-ri
- Ch'ap'yŏng-ri
- Hoeyang-ri
- Sinyang-ri
- Songch'ŏl-li
- Songgwal-li
- Wŏlhyŏl-li
- Wŏlsung-ri
- Wŏndae-ri
- Yangji-ri
- Yŏn'gang-ri

== See also ==
- Geography of North Korea
- Administrative divisions of North Korea
- Chagang
