= Ojok-tong =

Village in North Korea

- Village
- Interactive map of Ojok-tong
- Coordinates: 40°13′N 124°32′E
- Country: North Korea
- Province: North Pyongan
- Kun: Ŭiju

Population
  - Total: 54,767

Korean name
- Hangul: 어적동
- Hanja: 於赤洞
- RR: Eojeok-dong
- MR: Ŏjŏk-tong

Ojok-tong is a village located in Uiju, North Pyongan Province, North Korea. It has a population of around 54,767 residents.
