= Tongsin County =

Tongsin County 동신군
- County

Korean transcription(s)
  - Hanja: 東新郡
  - McCune-Reischauer: Tongsin kun
  - Revised Romanization: Dongsin-gun
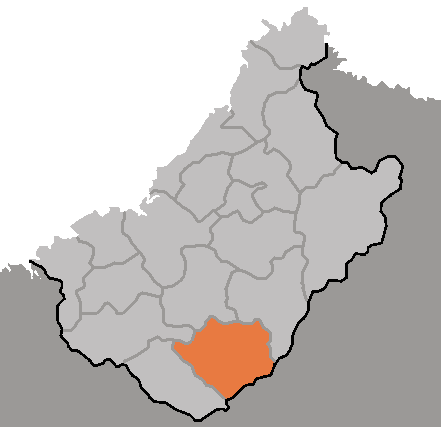
- Map of Chagang showing the location of Tongsin
- Country: North Korea
- Province: Chagang Province
- Administrative divisions: 1 ŭp, 14 ri

Area
  - Total: 1,211 km^{2} (468 sq mi)

Population (2008)
  - Total: 47,460
  - Density: 39.19/km^{2} (101.5/sq mi)

Tongsin County is a kun, or county, in southern Chagang province, North Korea. It borders Ryongrim and Chonchon to the north, the counties of Taehung and Yongwon in South Pyongan to the south and east, and Huichon and Songwon to the west and southwest. Originally part of Huichon, it was created in 1952 as part of a general reorganization of local government.

The valley of the Chongchon River lies in western Tongsin. High mountains rise on all other sides, with the Myohyang Mountains in the south and the Chogyuryong Mountains in the north and east; spurs and outliers of these ranges cover most of the county. The highest point is Ungosusan (웅어수산, 2020 m).

Agriculture and logging are the chief local industries. 13% of Tongsin's land is arable, and most of the remaining 87% is forested. Maize is the principal crop. There are no rail lines in the county, but roads tie it to nearby Huichon and Ryonggang, with a bus service operating between Tongsin and Huichon.

== Administrative divisions ==
Tongsin County is divided into 1 ŭp (town) and 14 ri (villages):

- Tongsin-ŭp
- Kŭmsŏk-ri
- Kyŏnghŭng-ri
- Munhwa-ri
- Onch'ŏl-li
- Paeksal-li
- Ryongp'yŏng-ri
- Saeng-ri
- Sŏkp'o-ri
- Sŏyang-ri
- Sujŏl-li
- Tongch'ang-ri
- Tonghŭng-ri
- Wŏnhŭng-ri
- Yaksu-ri

== See also ==
- Geography of North Korea
- Administrative divisions of North Korea
- Chagang
