= Chonma County =

Ch'ŏnma County 천마군
- County

Korean transcription(s)
  - Chosŏn'gŭl: 천마군
  - Hancha: 天摩郡
  - McCune-Reischauer: Ch'ŏnma-gun
  - Revised Romanization: Cheonma-gun
- Country: North Korea
- Province: North P'yŏngan
- Administrative divisions: 1 ŭp, 20 ri

Area
  - Total: 763.3 km^{2} (294.7 sq mi)

Population (2008)
  - Total: 50,462
  - Density: 66.11/km^{2} (171.2/sq mi)

Ch'ŏnma County is a kun, or county, in northwestern North P'yŏngan province, North Korea. It borders Kusŏng city and Taegwan county to the east, Sonch'ŏn and Tongrim counties to the south, Ŭiju and P'ihyŏn counties to the west, and Sakchu county to the north. It was created in 1952 from parts of Kusŏng and Ŭiju.

== Geography ==
There are abundant mountains, with the Ch'ŏnma and Munsu ranges both traversing the county. The highest peak is Ch'ŏnmasan, 1169 m. The Ch'ŏnmasan region provides habitat for a variety of animals, and has been designated an animal protection area.

The county lies in the Yalu River basin; major tributaries draining the county include the Samgyoch'ŏn and the Kojin and Ch'ŏnma Rivers; these have been dammed to create Manp'ung Lake as well as the Taeha Reservoir, the water from which is used to water the plains along the Yellow Sea.

== Administrative divisions ==
Ch'ŏnma county is divided into 1 ŭp (town) and 20 ri (villages):

- Ch'ŏnma-ŭp (천마읍/天摩邑)
- Chikyŏng-ri (지경리/地境里)
- Ch'ŏnsal-li (천산리/天山里)
- Illyŏng-ri (일녕리/一寧里)
- Kuam-ri (구암리/九岩里)
- Kŭmgol-li (금골리/金골里)
- Kwandong-ri (관동리/館洞里)
- Mihwa-ri (비화리/斐化里)
- Paekcha-ri (백자리/栢子里)
- Sambong-ri (삼봉리/三峰里)
- Samsŭng-ri (삼송리/三松里)
- Sinch'ang-ri (신창리/新昌里)
- Sinhŭng-ri (신흥리/新興里)
- Sinsi-ri (신시리/新市里)
- Sŏgu-ri (서고리/西古里)
- Songhyŏl-li (송현리/松峴里)
- Songrim-ri (송림리/宋林里)
- Taeha-ri (대하리/大鰕里)
- Taeu-ri (대우리/大牛里)
- Tonggu-ri (동고리/東古里)
- Yŏngsal-li (영산리/永山里)

== Climate ==
The climate is continental, with hot summers and cold winters. The average annual temperature is 8.7 °C, with a January average of -10.7 °C and an August average of 22.6 °C. The average annual rainfall is 1260 mm. Some 13% of the county's land is cultivated; 82% is forestland. Chonma leads the province in the production of hops.

== See also ==
- Geography of North Korea
- Administrative divisions of North Korea
- North Pyongan
