= Tongchang County =

Tongchang County 동창군
- County

Korean transcription(s)
  - Chosŏn'gŭl: 동창군
  - Hancha: 東倉郡
  - McCune-Reischauer: Tongch'ang-kun
  - Revised Romanization: Dongchang-gun
- Country: North Korea
- Province: North P'yŏngan
- Administrative divisions: 1 ŭp, 1 workers' district, 16 ri

Area
  - Total: 654 km^{2} (253 sq mi)

Population (2008)
  - Total: 28,665
  - Density: 43.8/km^{2} (114/sq mi)

Tongchang County is a kun, or county, in the northeast of the far western North Pyŏngan province, North Korea. It borders Pyŏktong and Chagang's Usi county to the north, Unsan and Songwŏn (in Chagang province) to the east, Thaechŏn to the south, and Changsŏng and Taegwan to the west.

== Geography ==
The Pinandŏk Mountains pass through northern and eastern Tongchang, contributing the county's highest point, Tanphungdŏksan (단풍덕산, 1159 m). The Changsŏng River flows from the northwest to the southeast, on its way to join the Taedong. Some 80% of the county's land is forested (of which 40% is coniferous, with mixed pine-oak woods predominating).

== Administrative divisions ==
Tongchang county is divided into 1 ŭp (town), 1 rodongjagu (workers' district) and 16 ri (villages):

- Tongchang-ŭp (동창읍/東倉邑)
- Taeyu-rodongjagu (대유로동자구/大楡勞動者區)
- Changam-ri (창암리/倉岩里)
- Chŏngryong-ri (청룡리/靑龍里)
- Hakpong-ri (학봉리/鶴峰里)
- Haksong-ri (학송리/鶴松里)
- Hoesang-ri (회상리/會上里)
- Kojik-ri (고직리/高直里)
- Kuryong-ri (구룡리/九龍里)
- Hwaphung-ri (화풍리/和豊里)
- Pongryong-ri (봉룡리/鳳龍里)
- Richŏn-ri (리천리/梨川里)
- Ryongdu-ri (룡두리/龍頭里)
- Ryulgok-ri (률곡리/栗谷里)
- Sinan-ri (신안리/新安里)
- Sŏngphyŏng-ri (성평리/城坪里)
- Taedong-ri (대동리/大洞里)
- Turyu-ri (두류리/頭龍里)

== Climate ==
The year-round local temperature is 7 °C, with an average of -10 °C in January and 22.8 °C in August. The average annual rainfall is quite high, at 1440 mm.

== Industry ==
The dominant local industry is mining. The first gold mine there was opened in Taeyu-dong in 1896 by a French concern. In addition, silver and apatite are now mined. Tongchang has the least cultivable land of any county in the province, at 6.5% of its total area; most of that (80%) consists of dry fields unsuitable for rice. The chief local crop, therefore, is maize. There are numerous small-scale hydroelectric power stations.

== See also ==
- Geography of North Korea
- Administrative divisions of North Korea
- North Pyongan
