= Pungso County =

Pungsŏ County 풍서군
- County

Korean transcription(s)
  - Chosŏn'gŭl: 풍서군
  - Hancha: 豊西郡
  - McCune-Reischauer: P'ungsŏ-gun
  - Revised Romanization: Pungseo-gun
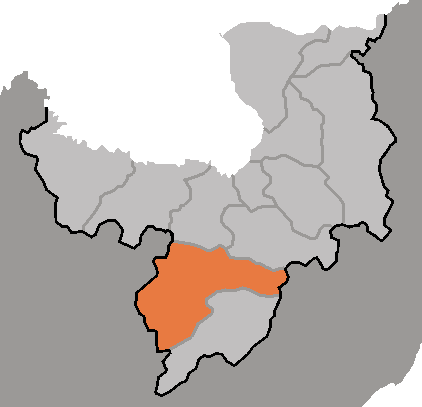
- Map of Ryanggang showing the location of Pungso
- Country: North Korea
- Province: Ryanggang
- Administrative divisions: 1 ŭp, 3 workers' districts, 17 ri

Area
  - Total: 1,812 km^{2} (700 sq mi)

Population (2008 census)
  - Total: 44,112
  - Density: 24.34/km^{2} (63.05/sq mi)

P'ungsŏ County is a kun, or county, in Ryanggang province, North Korea. It was formed after the division of Korea from portions of Kimhyŏnggwŏn (then P'ungsan) and Kapsan counties.

== Geography ==
Lying atop the southern portion of the Kaema Plateau, P'ungsŏ is heavily mountainous. In general, the mountains are higher in the northwest and lower toward the southeast. They include the Puksubaek range; the highest point is Puksubaeksan itself. The chief rivers are the Hŏch'ŏn and the Nŭnggwi (능귀강). P'ungsŏ Lake, an artificial reservoir, lies in the middle of the county. Some 91% of P'ungsŏ's area is covered with forestland.

== Administrative divisions ==
P'ungsŏ county is divided into 1 ŭp (town), 3 rodongjagu (workers' districts) and 17 ri (villages):

- P'ungsŏ-ŭp (풍서읍/豊西邑)
- Happ'o-rodongjagu (합포로동자구/合浦勞動者區)
- Sŏch'ang-rodongjagu (서창로동자구/西昌勞動者區)
- Yaksu-rodongjagu (약수로동자구/藥水勞動者區)
- Hwaŭl-li (회은리/會隱里)
- Kwanhŭng-ri (관흥리/館興里)
- Kwibong-ri (귀복리/貴福里)
- Muha-ri (무하리/舞下里)
- Munjo-ri (문조리/文藻里)
- Naep'o-ri (내포리/內浦里)
- Rimsŏ-ri (림서리/林西里)
- Rohŭng-ri (로흥리/櫓興里)
- Ryongmul-li (룡문리/龍門里)
- Sang-ri (상리/上里)
- Sinch'ang-ri (신창리/新昌里)
- Sindŏng-ri (신덕리/新德里)
- Sinmyŏng-ri (신명리/新明里)
- Sŏg'u-ri (석우리/石禹里)
- Soksil-li (속신리/俗新里)
- Up'o-ri (우포리/隅浦里)
- Yusangha-ri (유상하리/楡上下里)

== Economy ==
Logging is the chief industry in P'ungsŏ. There is little agriculture, due to the rugged terrain. However, some amounts of maize, potatoes, and wheat are produced on dry-field farms; livestock are also raised. The county is known for the production of bracken fern. The county is home to deposits of gold, lead and zinc.

== Transportation ==
The county is served by road, but not by rail. The Nŭnggwi River and P'ungsŏ Lake are used to transport raw lumber downstream.

== See also ==
- Geography of North Korea
- Administrative divisions of North Korea
- Ryanggang
