= 1952 Inter-Camp P.O.W. Olympics =

Mock event in the Korean War

1952 Inter-Camp P.O.W. Olympics 1952年战俘营奥运会
- Location: Pyuktong, D.P.R.K.
- Dates: 15–27 November 1952

1952 Inter-Camp P.O.W. Olympics
- Traditional Chinese: 1952年戰俘營奧運會
- Simplified Chinese: 1952年战俘营奥运会
Transcriptions
Standard Mandarin
- Hanyu Pinyin: 1952 nián zhànfú yíng àoyùnhuì

The 1952 Inter-Camp P.O.W. Olympics (Chinese: 1952年战俘营奥运会), also known as Inter-Camp POW Olympic Games, was a mock Olympic Games held at the Pyuktong Prisoner-of-War Camp (碧潼战俘营) of the Chinese People's Volunteer Army during the Korean War. The athletes were all United Nations POWs. It was often used as a propaganda campaign by China and North Korea to encourage more UN soldiers to surrender.

1952 Inter-Camp P.O.W. Olympics was not authorized by the International Olympic Committee, but was organized by the Chinese People's Volunteer Army, in accordance with the Olympic Charter.

== The games ==
The POW Olympics were held between 15–27 November 1952 at Pyuktong, D.P.R.K. The Chinese hoped to gain worldwide publicity and, whilst some prisoners refused to participate, over 500 prisoners of 11 nationalities took part. They were representative of all the prison camps in North Korea and competed in American football, baseball, softball, basketball, volleyball, track and field, soccer, gymnastics, and boxing. For the prisoners, this was an opportunity to meet with friends from other camps. They also acted as photographers, announcers and even reporters, who after each day's competition published a newsletter, the Olympic Roundup.

Overall Result	Team (Teams were arranged by Camp)
1st	Camp 5 (Pyoktong, North Korea)
2nd	Camp 1 (Changsong, North Korea)
3rd	Camp 4 (Pyoktong, North Korea)

== Propaganda value ==
The Olympics featured frequently in North Korean psychological warfare (PSYWAR) pamphlets and leaflets distributed to UN soldiers. The 1952 Olympics allowed Communist forces to point to the good conditions available to those who surrendered.

== See also ==
- 1944 Summer Olympics during the Second World War at which prisoners of war from Oflag II-C staged a comparable unofficial Olympic games.

== Bibliography ==
- Young, Charles S. (2014). Name, Rank, and Serial Number: Exploiting Korean War POWs at Home and Abroad. New York: Oxford University Press. ISBN 978-0-19-518348-1.
- Adams, Clarence (2007). An American Dream: The Life of an African American soldier and POW Who Spent Twelve Years in Communist China. Amherst: University of Massachusetts Press. ISBN 978-1-5584-9595-1.
