= Ragwon County =

Ragwon County 락원군
- County

Korean transcription(s)
  - Hanja: 樂園郡
  - McCune–Reischauer: Ragwŏn-gun
  - Revised Romanization: Nagwon-gun
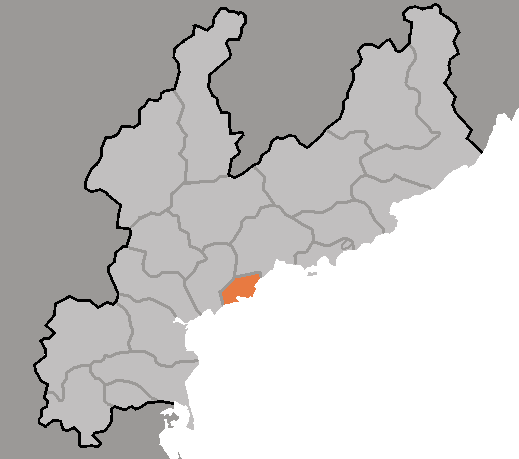
- Map of South Hamgyong showing the location of Ragwon
- Country: North Korea
- Province: South Hamgyong Province
- Administrative divisions: 1 ŭp, 1 workers' district, 11 ri

Population (2008)
  - Total: 60,700

Ragwŏn County is a county in South Hamgyŏng province, North Korea. Formerly known as T'oejo (퇴조), it was named in 1982 after Ragwŏn, paradise.

== Geography ==
It borders the Sea of Japan (East Sea of Korea) to the south and east. Most of the county is mountainous. The highest point is Chonchubong (천주봉). The coastal area includes the islands such as Chonchodo (전초도) and Chintudo (진두도). Forestland occupies about 75% of the county's area.

== Administrative divisions ==
Ragwŏn county is divided into 1 ŭp (town), 1 rodongjagu (workers' district) and 11 ri (villages):

- Ragwŏn-ŭp
- Samho-rodongjagu
- Changhŭng-ri
- Ch'ŏnjung-ri
- Hŭngsang-ri
- Hŭngsŏ-ri
- Ryŏho-ri
- Sadong-ri
- Sangsong-ri
- Sep'o-ri
- Sinp'ung-ri
- Sŏjung-ri
- Songhae-ri

== Economy ==
The local economy is centered on fishing. Abalone are harvested abundantly from Ragwon Bay. The processing of marine goods is also a developed local business. Local agriculture is dominated by maize. There are also orchards and a small amount of heavy industry.

The Ragwon County Offshore Farm was inaugurated on 30 August 2025, with Kim Jong Un attending. It is the second offshore farm constructed by North Korea.

== Transportation ==
Ragwŏn county is served by the P'yŏngra line of the Korean State Railway.

== See also ==
- Geography of North Korea
- Administrative divisions of North Korea
- South Hamgyong
