= 平安北道 =

平安北道 may refer to:

- Heianhoku-dō, administrative divisions of Korea under Japanese rule
- North Pyongan Province, province of North Korea
