= Uiju County =

Coordinates: 40°11′49″N 124°31′55″E

Ŭiju County 의주군
- County

Korean transcription(s)
  - Chosŏn'gŭl: 의주군
  - Hancha: 義州郡
  - McCune-Reischauer: Ŭiju-gun
  - Revised Romanization: Uiju-gun
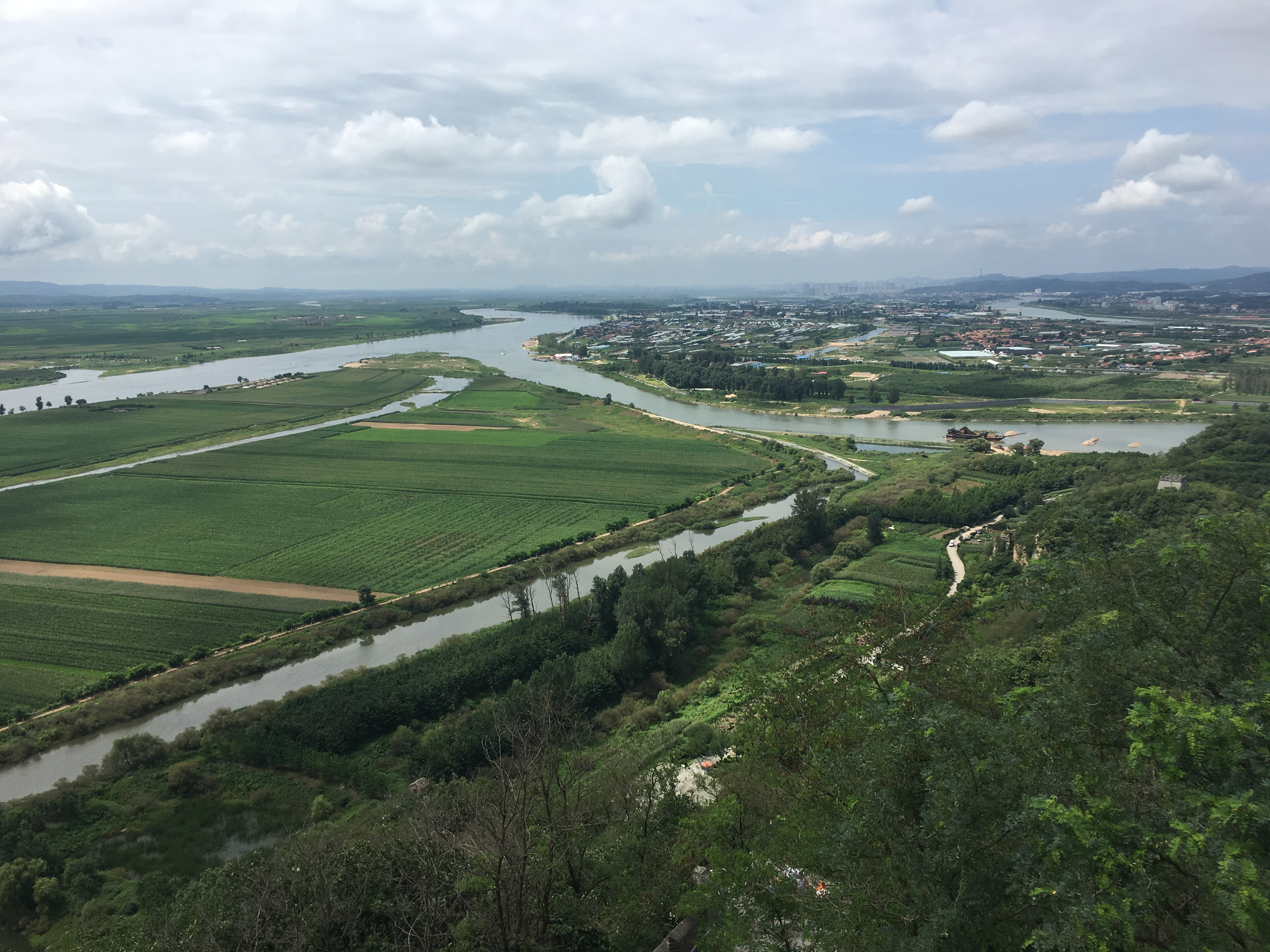
- View of Uiju from Dandong, Liaoning

- Country: North Korea
- Province: North P'yŏngan
- Administrative divisions: 1 ŭp, 2 workers' districts, 17 ri

Area
  - Total: 420 km^{2} (160 sq mi)

Population (2008)
  - Total: 110,018

Ŭiju is a kun, or county, in North Pyongan Province, North Korea. The county has an area of 420 km^{2}, and a population of 110,018 (2008 data).

== Name ==
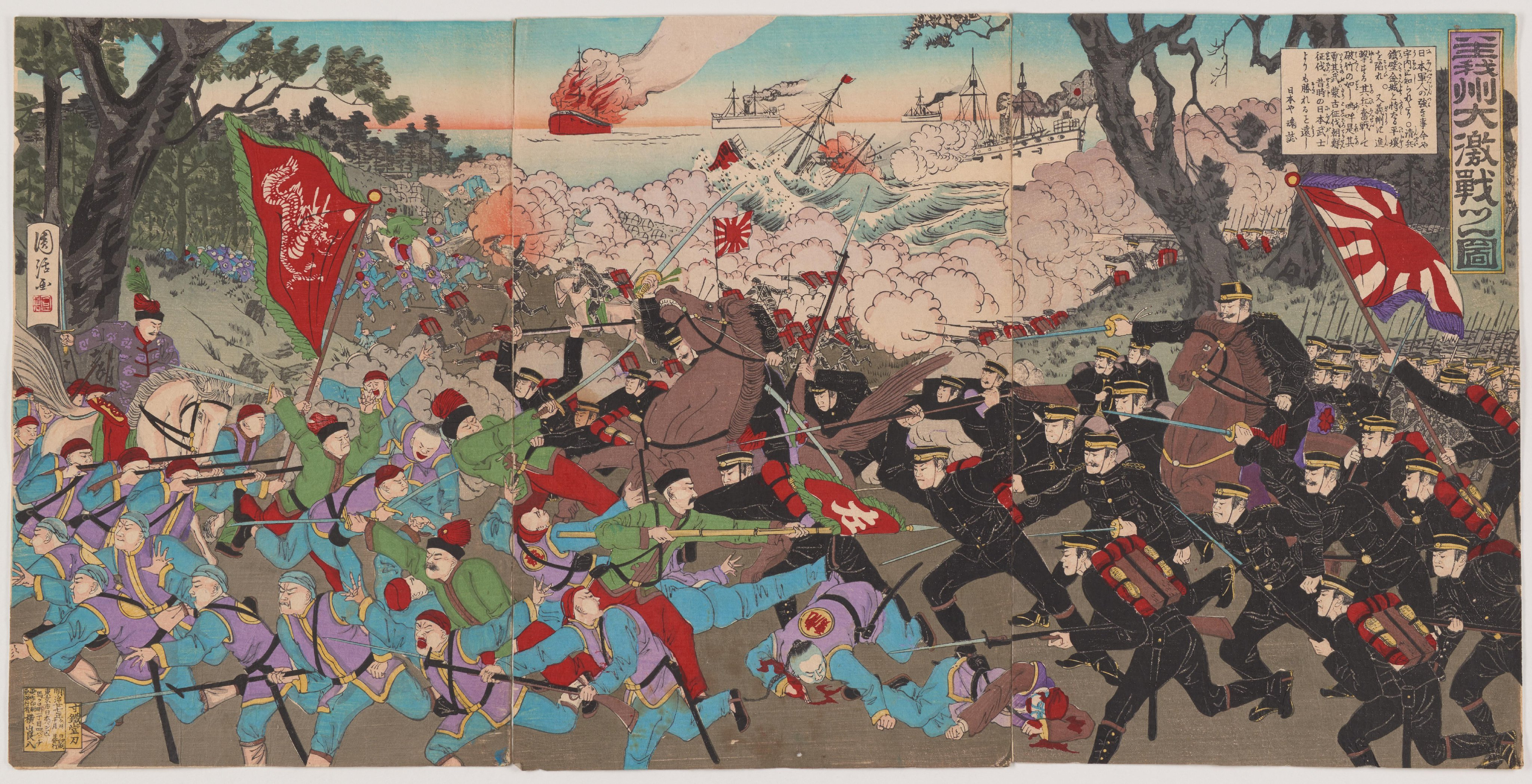
Fierce battle at Uiju between the Imperial Japanese army Chinese forces during the First Sino-Japanese War

Ŭiju appears as Uiju in South Korea's Revised Romanization and as Yizhou in Chinese sources, as during its occupation by general Mao Wenlong's forces during the Transition from Ming to Qing, and was called Gishū during the Chōsen period.

== Geography ==
Ŭiju County borders Sakchu county and Kusŏng to the east, Sŏnch'ŏn and Ch'ŏlsan counties to the south, and Ryongch'ŏn county and Sinŭiju to the west, respectively. To the north, Ŭiju shares a border with China.

== Administrative divisions ==
Ŭiju county is divided into 1 ŭp (town), 2 rodongjagu (workers' districts) and 17 ri (villages):

- Ŭiju-ŭp (의주읍)
- Tŏngryong-rodongjagu (덕룡로동자구)
- Tŏkhyŏl-lodongjagu (덕현로동자구)
- Chungdal-li (중단리)
- Ch'unsal-li (춘산리)
- Ch'u-ri (추리)
- Hŭngnam-ri (흥남리)
- Kŭmgwang-ri (금광리)
- Misong-ri (미송리)
- Ŏjŏng-ri (어적리)
- Ryonggye-ri (룡계리)
- Ryong'ul-li (룡운리)
- Sangha-ri (상하리)
- Sŏho-ri (서호리)
- Sujil-li (수진리)
- Taehwa-ri (대화리)
- Taemul-li (대문리)
- T'aesal-li (태산리)
- Unch'ŏl-li (운천리)
- Yŏn'u-ri (연우리)

== Transportation ==
Ŭiju county is served by the Tŏkhyŏn Line of the Korean State Railway. There is also an airport, Uiju Airfield (ICAO airport code: ZKUJ).

== 1980 earthquake ==
Ŭiju earthquake was a 5.3 magnitude earthquake that occurred in Ŭiju County in 1980. It is among the largest earthquakes by magnitude recorded in the Korean Peninsula since South Korea began official earthquake observation in 1978.

== See also ==
- Geography of North Korea
- Ojok-tong
- Battle of the Yalu River (1904)
