= Chongdan County =

Ch'ŏngdan County 청단군
- County

Korean transcription(s)
  - Hanja: 青丹郡
  - McCune-Reischauer: Ch'ŏngdan-gun
  - Revised Romanization: Cheongdan-gun
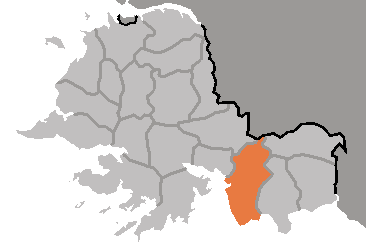
- Country: North Korea
- Province: South Hwanghae Province

Area
  - Total: 475 km^{2} (183 sq mi)

Population (2008)
  - Total: 142,607
  - Density: 300/km^{2} (778/sq mi)

Ch'ŏngdan County (Korean: 청단군) is a county in South Hwanghae province, North Korea.

== Administrative divisions ==
Ch'ŏngdan county is divided into 1 ŭp (town), 1 rodongjagu (workers' district) and 22 ri (villages):

- Ch'ŏngdan-ŭp
- Sinhŭng-rodongjagu
- Ch'ilbong-ri
- Ch'ŏngjŏng-ri
- Hŭngsal-li
- Hwasal-li
- Hwayang-ri
- Kalsal-li
- Kŭmhang-ri
- Kuwŏl-li
- Maryong-ri
- Namch'ol-li
- Ryongp'o-ri
- Samjŏng-ri
- Simp'yŏng-ri
- Sinp'ung-ri
- Sinsaeng-ri
- Sojŏng-ri
- Taep'ung-ri
- Tŏktal-li
- Tongdae-ri
- Un'gong-ri
- Yanghwa-ri
- Yangsal-li
