= Suan County =

Suan County 수안군 (Korean)
- County

Korean transcription(s)
  - Hanja: 遂安郡
  - McCune-Reischauer: Suan-gun
  - Revised Romanization: Suan-gun
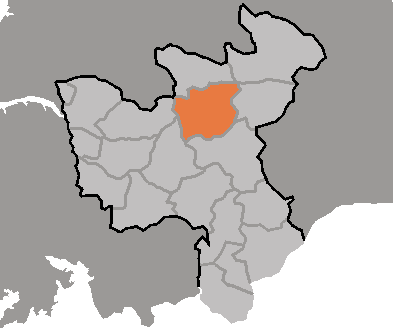
- Map of North Hwanghae showing the location of Suan
- Country: North Korea
- Province: North Hwanghae Province

Area
  - Total: 655 km^{2} (253 sq mi)

Population (2008)
  - Total: 76,890
  - Density: 117/km^{2} (304/sq mi)

Suan County is a county in North Hwanghae province, North Korea.

== Administrative divisions ==
Suan county is divided into 1 ŭp (town), 1 rodongjagu (workers' districts) and 17 ri (villages):

- Suan-ŭp
- Namch'ŏl-lodongjagu
- Chugyŏng-ri
- Chwawi-ri
- Ch'ŏlsal-li
- Ch'ŏn'am-ri
- Okch'i-ri
- P'yŏngwŏl-li
- Ryonghyŏl-li
- Ryongp'o-ri
- Sanbung-ri
- Sangdŏng-ri
- Sindae-ri
- Sŏkkyo-ri
- Sŏktam-ri
- Sŏnggyo-ri
- Sŏp'yŏng-ri
- Sudŏng-ri
- Tojŏl-li
