= Sungho County =

Coordinates: 39°01′48″N 126°00′00″E

Sŭngho 승호
- County
- 승호군 · Sŭngho County

Korean transcription(s)
  - Chosŏn'gŭl: 승호군
  - Hanja: 勝湖郡
  - McCune–Reischauer: Sŭngho-gun
  - Revised Romanization: Seungho-gun
- Interactive map of Sŭngho
- Country: North Korea
- Region: North Hwanghae Province
- Administrative divisions: 8 tong, 6 ri

Population (2008)
  - Total: 85,624

Sŭngho or Sŭngho-gun is a county of North Hwanghae Province, North Korea. It was formerly one of the 19 kuyŏk that constitute P'yŏngyang, but in 2010, it was administratively reassigned from P'yŏngyang to North Hwanghae; foreign media attributed the change as an attempt to relieve shortages in P'yŏngyang's food distribution system.

== Administrative divisions ==
Sŭngho county is divided into 8 tong (neighbourhoods) and 6 ri (villages):

- Apsae-dong(앞새동)
- Hwach'ŏn 1-dong(화천1동)
- Hwach'ŏn 2-dong(화천2동)
- Namgang-dong(남강동)
- Ripsŏk-tong(입석동)
- Sŭngho 1-dong(승호1동)
- Sŭngho 2-dong(승호2동)
- Tokkol-dong(독골동)
- Kŭm'ong-ri(금옥리)
- Kwangch'ŏng-ri(광정리)
- Mandal-li(만달리,萬達里)
- Pongdo-ri(봉도리)
- Rich'ŏl-li(이천리,梨川里)
- Samch'ŏng-ri(삼청리,三靑里)
