= Taechon Northwest Airport =

- IATA: none; ICAO: none

Summary
- Airport type: Military
- Serves: Taechon, North Korea
- Elevation AMSL: 293 ft / 89 m
- Coordinates: 39°59′36.40″N 125°21′55.60″E

Map
- Location of airport in North Korea

Runways
Direction	Length		Surface
Direction	ft	m	Surface
05/23	2,600	792	Grass

Taechon Northwest Airport, also known as Kumpungri Airport (금풍리비행장) is an airport in Pyongan-bukto, North Korea. It is 14 km northwest of the main Taechon Airport and also 15 km northeast of Panghyon Airport.

== Facilities ==
The airfield has a single grass runway 05/23 measuring 2600 x 161 feet (792 x 49 m).
