= Sinpyong County =

Sinp'yŏng County 신평군
- County

Korean transcription(s)
  - Hanja: 新坪郡
  - McCune-Reischauer: Sinp‘yŏng-gun
  - Revised Romanization: Sinpyeong-gun
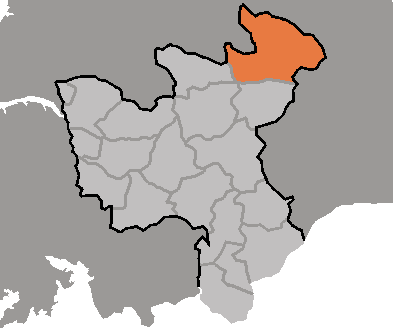
- Map of North Hwanghae showing the location of Sinpyong
- Country: North Korea
- Province: North Hwanghae Province

Area
  - Total: 1,075 km^{2} (415 sq mi)

Population (2008)
  - Total: 63,727
  - Density: 59.28/km^{2} (153.5/sq mi)

Sinp'yŏng County is a county in North Hwanghae province, North Korea. The Mannyon mine is located at Mannyon-rodongjagu.

Sinp'yŏng County is located in North Hwanghae province from the coast, near the Nam River and its mainstream, Taedong River in Pyongan Province.

== Administrative divisions ==
Sinp'yŏng county is divided into 1 ŭp (town), 2 rodongjagu (workers' districts) and 11 ri (villages):

- Sinp'yŏng-ŭp
- Mannyŏn-rodongjagu
- Myŏngmi-rodongjagu
- Ch'uranjŏl-li
- Kŏriso-ri
- Koŭp-ri
- Misong-ri
- Namch'ŏl-li
- P'yŏnghwa-ri
- Saengyang-ri
- Sŏg'am-ri
- Sŏn'am-ri
- Taeji-ri
- Toŭm-ri

== Transportation ==
Sinpyong County has a trolleybus line in Mannyon-rodongjagu. The line closed in early 2000s and has been partially dismantled since then, but still has a complete network of poles on the south side of the road.
