= Taegwan County =

Taegwan County 대관군
- County

Korean transcription(s)
  - Chosŏn'gŭl: 대관군
  - Hancha: 大館郡
  - McCune-Reischauer: Taegwan-gun
  - Revised Romanization: Daegwan-gun
- Country: North Korea
- Province: North P'yŏngan
- Administrative divisions: 1 ŭp, 1 workers' district, 22 ri

Area
  - Total: 865 km^{2} (334 sq mi)

Population (2008)
  - Total: 69,565
  - Density: 80.4/km^{2} (208/sq mi)

Taegwan County is a kun, or county, in northeastern North P'yŏngan province, North Korea. It lies in the province's interior, and is bounded by Tongch'ang on the east, Kusŏng and T'aech'ŏn to the south, Ch'ŏnma to the west, and Ch'angsŏng and Sakchu to the north. It was created in 1952 from portions of Sakchu county.

== Geography ==
Taegwan's borders are mountainous, with the Kangnam Mountains rising in the north and the Chonma Mountains in the west. The Taeryong River (대령강) flows through the county's centre, joined in its course by many fast small streams.

== Administrative divisions ==
Taegwan county is divided into 1 ŭp (town), 1 rodongjagu (workers' district) and 22 ri (villages):

- Taegwan-ŭp (대관읍/大館邑)
- Songp'yŏng-rodongjagu (송평로동자구/松坪勞動者區)
- Ch'ŏnggye-ri (청계리/淸溪里)
- Kŭmch'ang-ri (금창리/金倉里)
- Myŏngsang-ri (명상리/明上里)
- Namjŏng-ri (남장리/南長里)
- Obong-ri (오봉리/五峰里)
- P'yŏnghwa-ri (평화리/平和里)
- Rohŭng-ri (로흥리/老興里)
- Ryangsal-li (량산리/兩山里)
- Ryoha-ri (료하리/料下里)
- Ryongch'ang-ri (룡창리/龍昌里)
- Ryongsal-li (룡산리/龍山里)
- Sin'gwang-ri (신광리/新光里)
- Sinsang-ri (신상리/新上里)
- Sin'ol-li (신온리/新溫里)
- Songnam-ri (송남리/松南里)
- Suwŏl-li (수원리/水元里)
- Taeal-li (대안리/大安里)
- Tapp'ung-ri (답풍리/畓沓豊里)
- Tŏg'yŏl-li (덕연리/德淵里)
- Ullim-ri (운림리/雲林里)
- Unch'ang-ri (운창리/雲昌里)
- Wŏnp'ung-ri (원풍리/院豊里)

== Climate ==
Taegwan enjoys a relatively rainy climate, with an average annual rainfall of 1300 mm. The average temperature is 7 °C, fluctuating between an average of -11.2 °C in January and 22.5 °C in August.

== Economy ==
Some 83% of the county's area is forested; only 8.5% is cultivated. Most of these are dry fields, with maize the chief crop. Forestry, including lumber as well as the harvesting of wild herbs and fruits, is a major local industry; Taegwan is home to the province's largest lumber base, which specializes in wood for mining and construction applications. Gold and graphite are mined in the county, and a small hydroelectric generator harnesses the Taeryŏng River's stream. It is also home to a ballistic missile factory called No. 301 Factory and an operating missile base to the north of town, which saw significant expansion upon establishment since 2004.

== Transportation ==
The P'yŏngbuk Line of the Korean State Railway passes through the county, on its way between Chŏngju and Ch'ŏngsu.

== Education ==
Educational institutions in Taegwan include the Taegwan Technical School.

== See also ==
- Geography of North Korea
- Administrative divisions of North Korea
- North Pyongan
