= Ungok =

Un'gok 운곡지구
- District

Korean transcription(s)
  - Chosŏn'gŭl: 운곡지구
  - Hancha: 雲谷地區
  - McCune–Reischauer: Un’gok-jigu
  - Revised Romanization: Ungok-jigu
- Country: North Korea
- Province: South P'yŏngan
- Administrative divisions: 1 workers' district, 8 ri

Un'gok District is a chigu in South P'yŏngan province, North Korea.

== Administrative districts ==
The district is split into 1 rodongjagu (workers' district) and 8 ri (villages):

- Chŏnsal-rodongjagu (전산로동자구/氈山労働者区)
- Chunghŭng-ri (중흥리/中興里)
- Kuryong-ri (구룡리/九龍里)
- Pallyong-ri (반룡리/盤龍里)
- Ripsŏng-ri (립석리/立石里)
- Ryongbong-ri (룡복리/龍伏里)
- Ryongdam-li (룡담리/龍潭里)
- Ryongjŏl-li (룡전리/龍田里)
- Sinhŭng-ri (신흥리/新興里)
