= Pyoksong County =

Pyŏksŏng County 벽성군
- County

Korean transcription(s)
  - Hanja: 碧城郡
  - McCune-Reischauer: Pyŏksŏng-gun
  - Revised Romanization: Byeokseong-gun
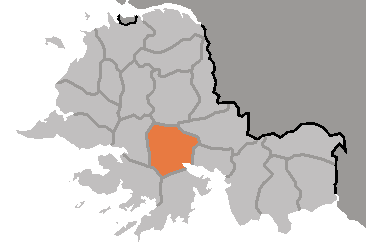
- Country: North Korea
- Province: South Hwanghae Province

Area
  - Total: 439.9 km^{2} (169.8 sq mi)

Population (2008)
  - Total: 90,753
  - Density: 206.3/km^{2} (534.3/sq mi)

Pyŏksŏng County is a county in South Hwanghae province, North Korea.

== Administrative divisions ==
Pyŏksŏng county is divided into 1 ŭp (town) and 21 ri (villages):

- Pyŏksŏng-ŭp
- An'gong-ri
- Changch'ŏl-li
- Changhyŏl-li
- Chukch'ŏl-li
- Okch'ŏl-li
- Namch'ang-ri
- Paeg'ul-li
- Ryongjŏng-ri
- Sahyŏl-li
- Sangrim-ri
- Sŏktam-ri
- Sŏktong-ri
- Sŏwŏl-li
- Ssangam-ri
- Taeho-ri
- Taesal-li
- Tohyŏl-li
- T'ongsal-li
- Wŏlbong-ri
- Wŏlhyŏl-li
- Wŏnp'yŏng-ri

== Transportation ==
Pyŏksŏng county is served by the Ongjin Line of the Korean State Railway.
