= Unsan County =

Unsan County 운산군
- County

Korean transcription(s)
  - Chosŏn'gŭl: 운산군
  - Hancha: 雲山郡
  - McCune-Reischauer: Unsan-gun
  - Revised Romanization: Unsan-gun
- Country: North Korea
- Province: North P'yŏngan
- Administrative divisions: 1 ŭp, 1 workers' district, 27 ri

Area
  - Total: 865.5 km^{2} (334.2 sq mi)

Population (2008)
  - Total: 102,928
  - Density: 118.9/km^{2} (308.0/sq mi)

Unsan County is a kun, or county, in eastern North P'yŏngan province, North Korea. Within the province, it borders Hyangsan to the east, Kujang and Nyŏngbyŏn to the south, and Tongch'ang and T'aech'ŏn to the west. In addition, it is bordered by Chagang province to the east (Hŭich'ŏn) and north (Songwŏn).

== History ==
=== Ancient history ===
No artefacts of human existence until the Bronze Age were found in the region, however, artefacts from the period are found in nearby counties, suggesting possible existence in the region at least from the Neolithic period. Knife money from the Yan dynasty found in nearby counties suggest the inhabitants traded with Yan merchants after the Eastern invasion of Yan by general Qinkai during the reign of King Zhao of Yan. The region became part of the territory of the kingdom of Goguryeo in 56 AD after the kingdom expanded its domain up until the Salsu river (presumed to be Chongchon River), but no record of a county actually installed is unclear. The region is thought to have suffered damage during the Sui invasion of Goguryeo, and the region is said to be holding the tomb of Goguryeo general Yŏn Kaesomun.

=== Medieval history ===
The region started becoming part of the territory of the Goryeo dynasty after a fortress was constructed in the region (The region was called wihwajin), a move that was part of the northern expansion project of Gwangjong of Goryeo. The region was known as Unjung County or Gowonhwajin during the Early Goryeo period but later got the name Wihwajin in 968. In 995, the region changed its name to Unju, and a defense institution was installed to ward off the invasions of the khitans in the north. In 1231, the residents of the region evacuated to Haedo island to escape the invading Mongols and temporarily stayed in a town west of Gasan (a town in Pyongan province), but later became incorporated into Yeonsanbu (a subdivision part of modern-day Yongbyon) but it separated to its own subdivision in 1271. In 1413, during the reign of Taejong of Joseon, the region officially was named Unsan County, however, some towns that were formerly under the control of the region became part of Chongju since it is too deep into the territory of other counties beside Unsan, "like teeth of a dog fit together (犬牙相入)". This decision shrank the number of houses under control of the subdivision to merely 70 making the independence of the county difficult, and the decision was reversed in 1449. In 1456, the town of Old Unsan was sent to the control of Chongju, and the town of Yonsan which was in the control of Yongbyon went under the control of Unsan.In 1459 the region was again incorporated into nearby counties, with work burden issues being located in a rural mountain, but this decision was also reversed in 1462.

=== Early modern history and westernization ===
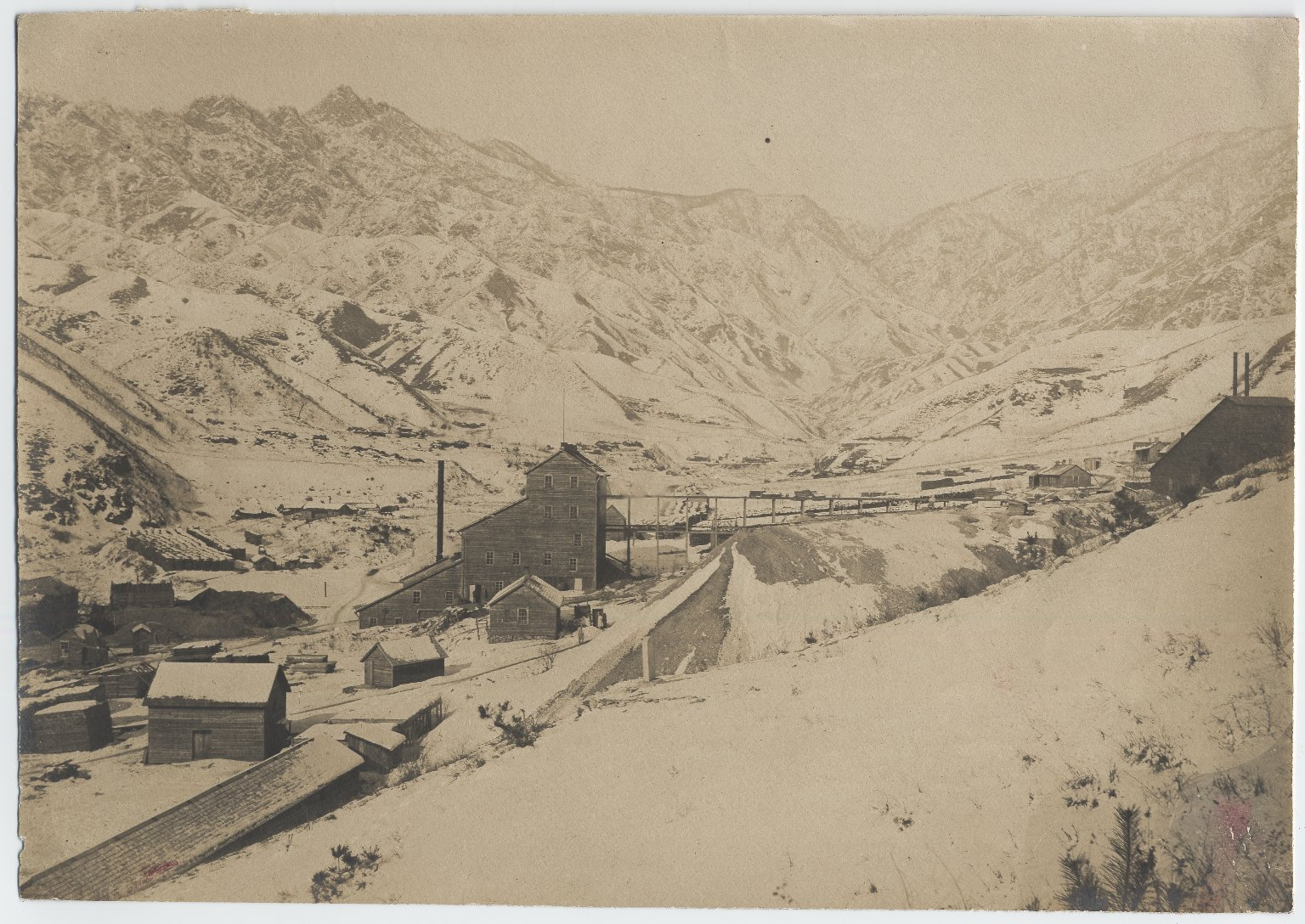
The Tabowie mining camp of the OCMC, c. 1908.

In 1895, after a drastic change in subdivisions as a consequence of the Gabo reforms, Unsan County became part of the Department of Uiju (modern-day Sinuiju). The region became part of North Pyongan Province in 1896. In July 1895, the Joseon dynasty signed a treaty with American businessman James R. Morse regarding the mining of gold in the region and established a joint corporation called the Oriental Consolidated Mining Company (OCMC,동양합동광업회사) in April 1896. The company later was owned by the Nippon Mining Company during the Japanese occupation of Korea. The region became one of the centers of protests associated with the March 1st Movement in 1919, led by local Christians. It also became the centre of armed rebellions against the Japanese regime.

=== After the liberation of Korea in 1945 ===
During the changes of 1952 by the North Korean government, the territory of the County was divided into two Counties, Unsan County and Bukjin County, but was reunited in 1954. In 1956, Bukjinri was abolished and part of its former domain became part of Bukjin worker's district (Pukchil-lodongjagu) and Kumsan worker's district (also later reincorporated into Pukchil-lodongjagu). An Urban warfare training base is located at 40°0′50″N 125°53′10″E.

== Geography ==
The Kuryong River (구룡강) has formed a steep valley and basin in the centre of the county, into which various tributaries flow including the Uhyŏn River, Choyang River, Ryonghŭng River, and P'ungsanch'ŏn. 73% of the county's area is forested, while only 15.5% is cultivated.

== Administrative divisions ==
Unsan county is divided into 1 ŭp (town), 1 rodongjagu (workers' district) and 27 ri (villages):

- Unsan-ŭp (운산읍)
- Pukchil-lodongjagu (북진로동자구)
- Cheil-li (제인리)
- Chŏnsŭng-ri (전승리)
- Chonyang-ri (조양리)
- Chwa-ri (좌리)
- Hwaŭng-ri (화응리)
- Kosŏng-ri (고성리)
- Kuŭp-ri (구읍리)
- Masang-ri (마상리)
- Majang-ri (마장리)
- Namsal-li (남산리)
- Nit'am-ri (니탑리)
- Pang'ŏ-ri (방어리)
- Pongji-ri (봉지리)
- Puhŭng-ri (부흥리)
- P'ungyang-ri (풍양리)
- P'yŏnghwa-ri (평화리)
- Ryongho-ri (룡호리)
- Ryonghŭng-ri (룡흥리)
- Samsal-li (삼산리)
- Sangwŏl-li (상원리)
- Sŏngbong-ri (성봉리)
- Tangsang-ri (당상리)
- Toch'ŏl-li (도청리)
- Ŭngbong-ri (응봉리)
- Wŏl'yang-ri (월양리)
- Yŏng'ung-ri (영웅리)
- Yŏnha-ri (연하리)

== Climate ==
The year-round average temperature is 8.2 °C, with a January average of -10.2 °C and an August average of 23.8 °C. The climate is fairly wet, with an average annual rainfall of 1400 mm.

== Economy ==
Of Unsan's cultivated land, most (70%) is dry-field, with numerous cattle farms; local crops include maize, soybeans, sweet potatoes, and vegetables as well as rice. Unsan leads the province in the production of sweet potatoes. Fruit is also raised. Gold and silver are mined, and factories produce textiles and ironware.

In Ryongho-ri on the slopes of Kubongsan, there are tombs from the Koguryŏ period. A tomb traditionally held to be that of the Kojosŏn ruler Wiman is also located there.

== Transportation ==
Unsan is served by the Unsan Line of the Korean State Railway, and is also connected to neighbouring districts by road.

As of December 2016, a small runway is being installed near the Sunchon Cement Factory, believed to be intended for use by small aircraft transporting Kim Jong-un.

== See also ==
- Battle of Unsan
- Geography of North Korea
- Administrative divisions of North Korea
