= Rodongjagu =

Administrative division of North Korea

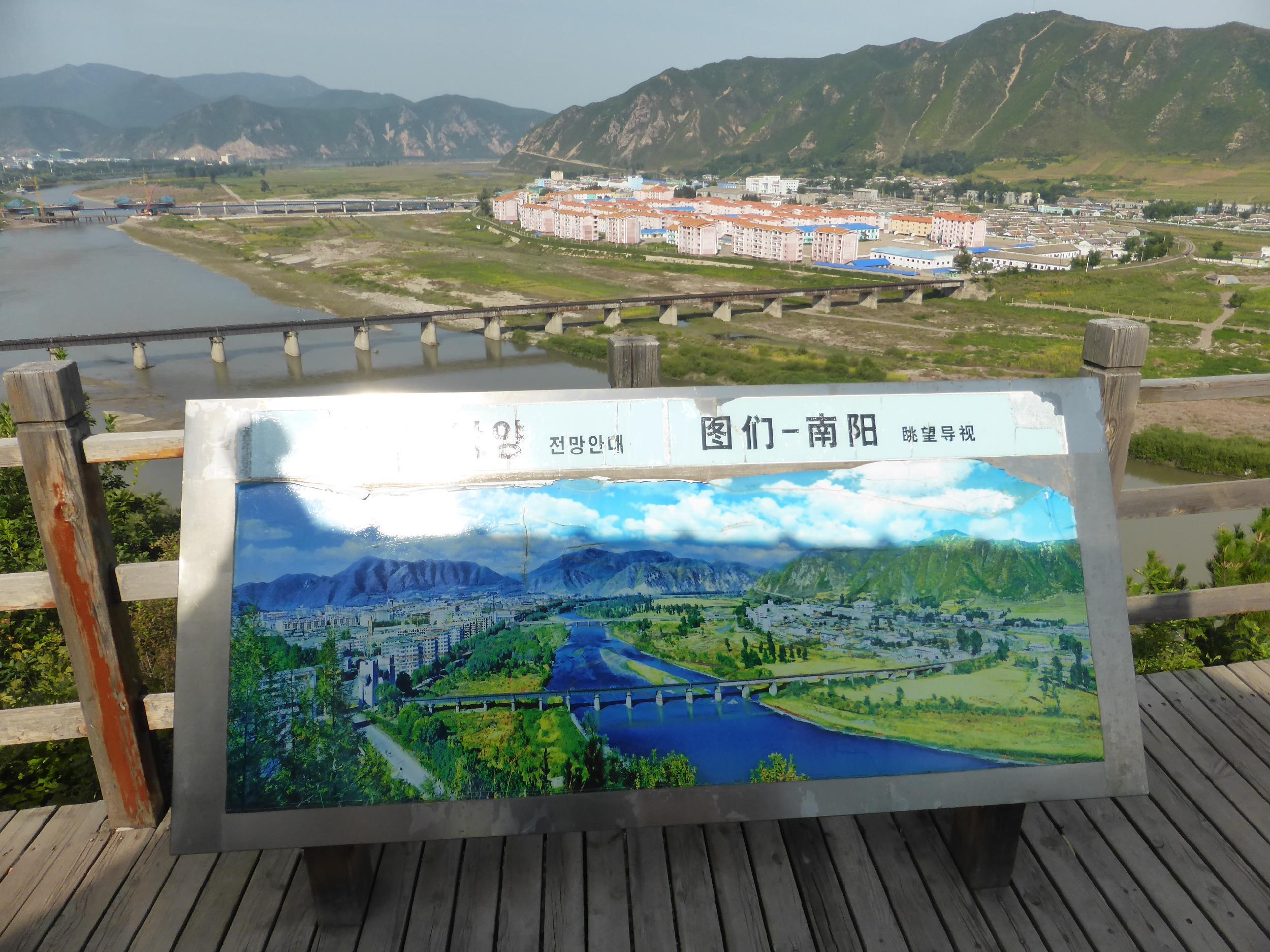
Namyang Workers' District viewed from the Chinese border

A Workers' District (Korean: 로동자구; MR: rodongjagu) is a third-level administrative division of North Korea, meaning it lies below a city or county. They are a special type of village characterized by high density residential areas located adjacent to industrial sites or special farms.

== Description ==
Workers' Districts were first introduced with the administrative reform of December 1952. They are established in areas where there are 400 or more adult residents and where the proportion of workers exceeds 65%. A Workers' District will have an administrative agency, the Workers' District Office, and an administrative organization, the Workers' District Accounting Committee.

Typically, they are established under a county, and there are only a few worker districts that belong to a city, such as Hamhung City's Raeil Workers' District (Korean version).

According to reports from the Republic of Korea Statistics Office, the total number of Workers' Districts is 314 as of 2022, an increase of 16 from 2021.
