= Hwasong-guyok =

District in North Korea

Hwasŏng-guyŏk 화성구역
- Guyŏk of Pyongyang

Korean transcription(s)
  - Hanja: 和盛區域
  - McCune-Reischauer: Hwasŏng-guyŏk
  - Revised Romanization: Hwaseong-guyeok
- Location of Hwasong-guyok within Pyongyang
- Coordinates: 39°05′47″N 125°46′39″E
- Country: North Korea
- Direct-administered city: P'yŏngyang-Chikhalsi

Hwasong-guyok or Hwasong District is one of the 19 guyok which constitute the city of Pyongyang, North Korea. This planned district was created from areas close to the Kumsusan Palace of the Sun based on a decision on May 15, 2022 by the Standing Committee of the Supreme People's Assembly. The region is known for its residential projects being constructed.

== Administrative divisions ==
The administrative divisions of the district as of January 29, 2026, are as follows:

	Chosŏn'gŭl	Hancha
Chonggye 1-dong	청계1동	
Chonggye 2-dong	청계2동	
Chonggye 3-dong	청계3동	
Chonghwa 1-dong	청화1동	淸華一洞
Hwasong 1-dong	화성1동	和盛一洞
Hwasong 2-dong	화성2동	和盛二洞
Hwasong 3-dong	화성3동	和盛三洞
Hwawon 1-dong	화원1동	
Hwawon 2-dong	화원2동	
Hwawon 3-dong	화원3동	
Kumnung 1-dong	금릉1동	錦綾一洞
Kumnung 2-dong	금릉2동	錦綾二洞
Kumnung 3-dong	금릉3동	錦綾三洞
Saeppyol-dong	새별동	
Songam-dong	송암동	

== Residential project ==
North Korea's five-year project to build 50,000 new flats was unveiled in 2021 by Kim Jong Un during the 8th Congress of the WPK which aims to address housing shortages and improve living standards of the people in Pyongyang. The project is split into 5 stages, with 10,000 new flats to be built per year. In 2022, the first stage of 10,000 flats were completed in the Songsin and Songhwa areas of Sadong District. Construction in the Hwasong area consists of four stages of construction: Hwasong Street as Stage No.1, Rimhung Street as Stage No.2, Stage No.3, and Saebyol (Saeppyol) Street as Stage No.4. During construction of Hwasong Street, the area was officially named Hwasong District of Pyongyang City. In 2024, Construction on the 4th stage of the Hwasong District began on February 16, 2025 during the 83rd anniversary of General Kim Jong Il’s birth. According to DPRK state media, the 4th stage of the Hwasong District, Saebyol Street was inaugurated on February 16, 2026, concluding the 5-year construction project and claimed that nearly 60,000 homes and public buildings were completed in the city, surpassing the initial plan. On February 18, 2026, a 5th stage of construction in Hwasong District broke ground in a ceremony.

== Hwasong Computer Entertainment Hall ==
In 2025, an entertainment hall for computer gaming called the Hwasong Computer Entertainment Hall (화성콤퓨터오락관(Hwasong kompyuto orakkwan)) opened in the district. It features gaming computers of Asus' Republic of Gamers brand with Nvidia RTX graphics cards. The games are mainly from Western publishers whose online features were later restricted. Although forbidden, some imagery was leaked by players. Games including Fifa 11, Counter Strike 2, Dota 2, Call of Duty: Black Ops II or Far Cry 2 and 5 are available to play. The official way to play these games is remarkable, as the consumption of western media is usually punished harshly by the state officials.

== Hwasong Taedonggang Beer Restaurant ==
As parts of developments in Rimhung Street in 2024, a landmark beer bar selling the signature Taedonggang beer and unspecified international beers opened in the district. The Hwasong Taedonggang Beer Restaurant (화성대동강맥주집(Hwasong Daedonggang Maekju-jip)) is a 2-storey bar that incorporates Taedonggang beer branding and features beer halls, separate rooms, and balconies.
