= Taechon County =

T'aechŏn County 태천군
- County

Korean transcription(s)
  - Chosŏn'gŭl: 태천군
  - Hancha: 泰川郡
  - McCune-Reischauer: T'aech'ŏn-gun
  - Revised Romanization: Taecheon-gun
- Country: North Korea
- Province: North P'yŏngan
- Administrative divisions: 1 ŭp, 1 workers' district, 21 ri

Area
  - Total: 720.9 km^{2} (278.3 sq mi)

Population (2008)
  - Total: 108,894
  - Density: 151.1/km^{2} (391.2/sq mi)

T'aechŏn or Thaechŏn (in North Korean romanization) is a kun, or county, in central North P'yŏngan province, North Korea. It borders Taegwan and Tongch'ang to the north, Unsan and Nyŏngbyŏn to the east, Pakch'ŏn and Unjŏn to the south, and Kusŏng to the west.

== Geography ==
Mountains are scattered across the county, with the Pinandŏk mountains rising in the east. The tallest of these is Paegundŏksan (백운덕산, 868 m), but the county's highest point is in the north, at Samgaksan (삼각산, 936 m). The county is drained by the Taeryŏng River and its tributaries, which include the Ch'ŏnbang and Ch'angsŏng. Some 64% of the county's area is forestland, while 30% is cultivated.

== Administrative divisions ==
T'aech'ŏn county is divided into 1 ŭp (town), 1 rodongjagu (workers' district) and 21 ri (villages):

- T'aech'ŏn-ŭp (태천읍)
- Paljŏl-lodongjagu (발전로동자구)
- Anhŭng-ri (안흥리)
- Chinnam-ri (진남리)
- Ch'ŏn'gye-ri (천계리)
- Ch'wihŭng-ri (취흥리)
- Hakpong-ri (학봉리)
- Haktang-ri (학당리)
- Hwanhyŏl-li (환현리)
- Mahyŏl-li (마현리)
- Rimch'ŏl-li (림천리)
- Ryonghŭng-ri (룡흥리)
- Ryongsang-ri (룡상리)
- Sangdal-li (상단리)
- Sinbong-ri (신봉리)
- Sin'gwang-ri (신광리)
- Songt'ae-ri (송태리)
- Songwŏl-li (송원리)
- Taeha-ri (대하리)
- Tŏkhŭng-ri (덕흥리)
- Tŏkhwa-ri (덕화리)
- Ullyong-ri (운룡리)
- Unhŭng-ri (운흥리)

== Climate ==
The year-round annual temperature is 8.5 °C, with a January mean of -10 °C and an August mean of 23.8 °C. The annual rainfall is 1,338 mm (53 in). On average, there are 40 foggy days per year.

== Economy ==
Crops raised on the cultivated land include maize, rice, tobacco and vegetables; Taechon leads the province in maize production. In addition, various animals are raised including silkworms, rabbits, cattle and hogs. There are numerous deposits of gold and graphite.

== Transportation ==
The Ch'ŏngnyŏn P'arwŏn Line of the Korean State Railway passes through the county, on its way between Kusŏng and Kujang.

There are two airfields in the county - T'aech'ŏn Airport and T'aech'ŏn Northwest Airport.

== Places of interest ==
The Silla-era temple Yanghwasa still stands in T'aech'ŏn.

Educational institutions in T'aech'ŏn include T'aech'ŏn Technical School (태천전문학교).

The construction of the Taechon nuclear power plant (39.928°N 125.569°E) was halted in 1994 in accordance with the U.S.-North Korea Agreed Framework.

== See also ==
- Geography of North Korea
- Administrative divisions of North Korea
- North Pyongan
