= Kimhyonggwon County =

Kimhyŏnggwŏn County 김형권군
- County

Korean transcription(s)
  - Chosŏn'gŭl: 김형권군
  - Hancha: 金亨權郡
  - McCune-Reischauer: Kimhyŏnggwŏn-gun
  - Revised Romanization: Gimhyeonggwon-gun
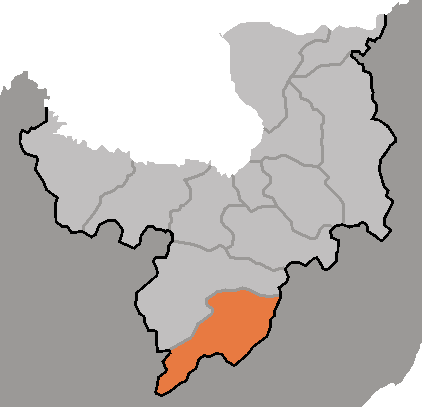
- Map of Ryanggang showing the location of Kimhyonggwon
- Coordinates: 40°45′00″N 128°10′00″E
- Country: North Korea
- Province: Ryanggang
- Administrative divisions: 1 ŭp, 1 workers' district, 17 ri

Area
  - Total: 1,243 km^{2} (480 sq mi)

Population (2008)
  - Total: 37,528
  - Density: 30.19/km^{2} (78.20/sq mi)

Kimhyŏnggwŏn is a kun, or county, in southeastern Ryanggang province, North Korea. It borders South Hamgyŏng to the south. Previously known as Pungsan, it was renamed by Kim Il Sung in 1990. He named it after his uncle, Kim Hyŏng-gwŏn. It is known for its striking scenery and for the Pungsan Dog, a large breed of hunting dog.

== Geography ==
Kimhyŏnggwŏn lies on the southeastern edge of the Kaema Plateau, and is covered with mountainous terrain. The Hamgyong Mountains and the Puksubaek Mountains both pass through the county. The highest peak is Paeksan. There are many streams; the chief among them is the Hŏch'ŏn River. Some 88% of the county's area is occupied by forestland.

== Climate ==
Climate data for Pungsan (1991–2020)
Month	Jan	Feb	Mar	Apr	May	Jun	Jul	Aug	Sep	Oct	Nov	Dec	Year
Mean daily maximum °C (°F)	−6.2 (20.8)	−2.8 (27.0)	3.1 (37.6)	11.0 (51.8)	17.9 (64.2)	21.6 (70.9)	23.9 (75.0)	23.5 (74.3)	19.2 (66.6)	13.0 (55.4)	3.5 (38.3)	−4.3 (24.3)	10.3 (50.5)
Daily mean °C (°F)	−14.4 (6.1)	−10.7 (12.7)	−3.8 (25.2)	3.9 (39.0)	10.3 (50.5)	14.6 (58.3)	17.9 (64.2)	17.4 (63.3)	11.7 (53.1)	4.6 (40.3)	−4.0 (24.8)	−11.9 (10.6)	3.0 (37.4)
Mean daily minimum °C (°F)	−21.3 (−6.3)	−17.8 (0.0)	−10.7 (12.7)	−3.0 (26.6)	3.1 (37.6)	8.3 (46.9)	12.9 (55.2)	12.6 (54.7)	5.4 (41.7)	−2.4 (27.7)	−10.5 (13.1)	−18.6 (−1.5)	−3.5 (25.7)
Average precipitation mm (inches)	6.4 (0.25)	6.6 (0.26)	13.4 (0.53)	26.8 (1.06)	49.2 (1.94)	93.4 (3.68)	157.2 (6.19)	132.0 (5.20)	64.5 (2.54)	30.1 (1.19)	20.7 (0.81)	9.5 (0.37)	609.8 (24.01)
Average precipitation days (≥ 0.1 mm)	3.1	4.2	6.4	7.9	10.2	12.5	13.7	12.6	7.5	5.4	5.8	4.6	93.9
Average snowy days	5.1	5.7	8.8	6.7	1.1	0.0	0.0	0.0	0.0	1.9	6.5	6.3	42.1
Average relative humidity (%)	72.2	68.5	66.5	63.4	66.5	77.0	82.9	83.3	78.0	69.4	71.3	72.2	72.6
Source: Korea Meteorological Administration

== Administrative divisions ==
Kimhyŏnggwŏn county is divided into 1 ŭp (town), 1 rodonjagu (workers' district) and 17 ri (villages):

- Kimhyŏnggwŏn-ŭp (김형권읍)
- P'yŏngsal-lodongjagu (평산로동자구)
- Changal-li (장안리/長安里)
- Changp'yŏng-ri (장평리/長坪里)
- Chigyŏng-ri (지경리/地境里)
- Chiksŏl-li (직설리/直雪里)
- Hajigyŏng-ri (하지경리/下地境里)
- Hwangsuwŏl-li (황수원리/黄水院里)
- Kwangdŏng-ri (광덕리/広徳里)
- Migam-ri (미감리/米甘里)
- Naejung-ri (내중리/内中里)
- P'abal-li (파발리/擺撥里)
- Rip'o-ri (리포리/梨浦里)
- Roŭl-li (로은리/老隠里)
- Saa-ri (사아리/士雅里)
- Sinwŏl-li (신원리/新元里)
- Sudong-ri (수동리/水東里)
- Tonghŭng-ri (동흥리/東興里)
- Yangp'yŏng-ri (양평리/陽坪里)

== Economy ==
There are several hydroelectric power stations in the county. There is also a great deal of dry-field farming; the chief local crops include hops and flax. In addition, potatoes, wheat, soybeans, and barley are grown, and livestock are also raised. In addition, there is some manufacturing and mining, with deposits of gold, nickel, graphite and iron sulfide found in the county.

== Transportation ==
Kimhyŏnggwŏn is served by road, but not by rail.

== See also ==
- Geography of North Korea
- Administrative divisions of North Korea
