= Mannyon mine =

Tungsten mine in North Korea

Coordinates: 38.9439°N 126.9545°E

Mannyŏn mine
- Interactive map of Mannyŏn mine
- Location: Mannyon-rodongjagu, Sinpyong County, South Hamgyong Province, North Korea
- Products: Tungsten

- Mannyon mine
- Chosŏn'gŭl: 만년광산
- Hancha: 萬年鑛山
- Revised Romanization: Mannyeon-gwangsan
- McCune–Reischauer: Mannyŏn'gwangsan

The Mannyŏn mine is one of the largest tungsten mines in North Korea and in the world. The mine is located in the center of the country in South Hamgyong Province. The mine has estimated reserves 20 million tonnes of ore grading 0.65% tungsten.

A trolleybus line runs through Mannyon-rodongjagu, terminating near the entrance to the mine. However, operation has been suspended since the early 2000s.
