= Yodok County =

Coordinates: 39°36′40″N 126°50′40″E

Yodŏk County
- County
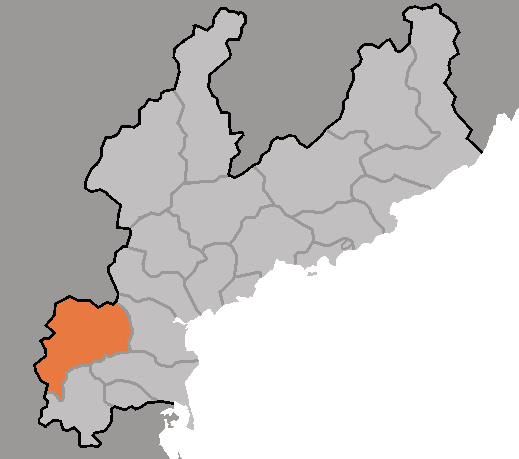
- Map of South Hamgyong showing the location of Yodok
- Country: North Korea
- Province: South Hamgyong Province
- Administrative divisions: 1 ŭp, 21 ri

Area
  - Total: 1,292 km^{2} (499 sq mi)

Population (2008)
  - Total: 40,839
  - Density: 31.61/km^{2} (81.87/sq mi)

Korean name
- Hangul: 요덕군
- Hanja: 耀德郡
- RR: Yodeok-gun
- MR: Yodŏk-kun

Yodŏk is a county in South Hamgyŏng province, North Korea. Originally part of Yŏnghŭng county (now Kŭmya County), it became a separate entity as part of the 1952 reorganization of local government.

== Name ==
The County is named after a fortress that was built in the region in 1023 called Yodokjin, meaning "A fortress on a hill where the sun shines".

== History ==
=== Ancient times ===
The region was under the dominion of the kingdom of OKjeo, which formed its southern regions. In 56 it was incorporated into the kingdom of Goguryeo, and during the rule of Goguryeo the region was called Jangryongjin, Dangmun, or Bakpyong County. The region was administered under the Namgyongnamhae department under Balhae.

=== Medieval times ===
After the fall of Balhae, the region was roamed by the Jurchens, until they were reincorporated into the kingdom of Goryeo in 920. The region was renamed as Hwaju, and fortresses were constructed including the famous Cheolli Jangseong. The region went under the control of Ssangseong Prefectures, after Goryeo was defeated by the Yuan dynasty.

=== Japanese occupation ===
The regions that forms modern day Yodok County today, were administered under Yonghung County (formed as a result of a subdivision change in 1895) as follows,

==== Sonhungmyon ====
Sonhungmyon was a myon that was originally known as Sondokmyon in 1907, was named as Sonhung in 1910.The region was mountainous and known for growing potatoes, beans and Foxtail millets, and was known for grazing cows and the production of timber. A branch of the Yonghung river called the Bulryusu was a river known to be a ritual site for kings and housed the Jinjung temple where an oral story of a buddhist monk exists. It also had ruins of a fortress called Pyongchonsansong.

==== Yodokmyon ====
Yodokmyon was a myon known for weaving textiles made from cannabis. It had the Yodokjin and Wolwangryong peak.

==== Hwengchonmyon ====
Hwengchonmyon hosted an ancient fortress ruin called Gocholongsongji. It also was known for its market of livestock.

=== After liberation of Northern Korea ===
The county was part of Yonghung County, until 1952. The county was formed from Sonhungmyon, Yodokmyon and 23 ris that were part of Hwengchonmyon, which was part of Yonghung County.

== Natural geography ==
Most of the county is mountainous. Yodŏk is traversed by the Rangrim and Puktaebong ranges. The chief river is the Ryonghŭng. The highest point is Raganbong. Roughly 90% of the county's area is forestland.

== Administrative divisions ==
Yodŏk county is divided into 1 ŭp (town) and 21 ri (villages):

- Yodŏk-ŭp
- Ch'ŏnhŭng-ri
- Hŭngsang-ri
- Hyangbong-ri
- Inhŭng-ri
- Inhwa-ri
- Kuŭp-ri
- Kwanp'yŏng-ri
- Misam-ri
- Mun'am-ri
- P'yŏngjŏl-li
- P'yŏngwŏl-li
- Ripsŏng-ri
- Ryangsu-ri
- Ryongp'yŏng-ri
- Sŏng-ri
- Sŏngch'ŏl-li
- Songdo-ri
- Taesung-ri
- Tongsal-li
- Unhŭng-ri
- Wansal-li

== Economy ==
Due to the rugged terrain, agriculture is nearly impossible. However, a few farms are tucked into the mountains, harvesting maize, soybeans, millet, wheat and barley.

== Transport ==
Yodŏk county is served primarily by roads, but there is a single railway station on the P'yŏngra line of the Korean State Railway in Yodŏk-ŭp.

== Camp ==
Yodŏk is the site of the Yodŏk concentration camp.

== See also ==
- Geography of North Korea
- Administrative divisions of North Korea
