= Sonchon County =

Coordinates: 39°47′57″N 124°55′02″E

Sŏnch'ŏn County 선천군
- County

Korean transcription(s)
  - Chosŏn'gŭl: 선천군
  - Hancha: 宣川郡
  - McCune-Reischauer: Sŏnch'ŏn-gun
  - Revised Romanization: Seoncheon-gun
- Country: North Korea
- Province: North P'yŏngan
- Administrative divisions: 1 ŭp, 24 ri

Area
  - Total: 724 km^{2} (280 sq mi)

Population (2008)
  - Total: 126,350
  - Density: 175/km^{2} (452/sq mi)

Sŏnch'ŏn County is a kun, or county, on the coast of the Yellow Sea in west-central North P'yŏngan province, North Korea. To the north it borders Ch'ŏnma, to the east Kusŏng and Kwaksan, and to the west Tongrim; to the south, it borders nothing but the sea. Sŏnch'ŏn was reorganized in 1952, with two myŏn, or townships, being split off to form the new county of Tongrim.

== Physical features ==
The terrain varies between hills and plains; numerous islands are also found along the indented coastline. The highest point is Kainbong (가인봉, 535 m), which is the source of the Tongrae River. The year-round average temperature is 8.5 °C, with a January average of -9.2 °C and an August average of 23.6 °C. The average annual rainfall is 1192 mm. The island of Sinmido hosts a peak of 532 m, Unjongsan, and is also home to a variety of plants normally found only in warm areas. Some 45% of the county's area is forestland.

== Administrative divisions ==
Sŏnch'ŏn county is divided into 1 ŭp (town) and 24 ri (villages):

- Sŏnch'ŏn-ŭp (선천읍)
- Wŏlch'ŏl-li (월천리)
- Paekhyŏl-li (백현리)
- Ansang-ri (안상리)
- In'am-ri (인암리)
- Kuch'ŏl-li (구청리)
- Kusŏng-ri (고성리)
- Wŏnbong-ri (원봉리)
- Sambong-ri (삼봉리)
- Sŏkhwa-ri (석화리)
- Samsŏng-ri (삼성리)
- Kobu-ri (고부리)
- Changgong-ri (장공리)
- Hyoja-ri (효자리)
- Yŏnbong-ri (연봉리)
- Roha-ri (로하리)
- In'gong-ri (인곡리)
- Songhyŏl-li (송현리)
- Ilbong-ri (일봉리)
- Chang'yo-ri (장요리)
- Chindo-ri (진도리)
- Yaksu-ri (약수리)
- Munsa-ri (문사리)
- Wŏnch'ang-ri (원창리)
- Unjong-ri (운종리)

== Economy ==
The local economy relies on agriculture, including livestock-raising and sericulture, as well as fishing and manufacturing. Local crops include rice, maize, tobacco and soybeans. Factories in Sŏnch'ŏn manufacture ironware, ceramics, and tobacco products.

== Transportation ==
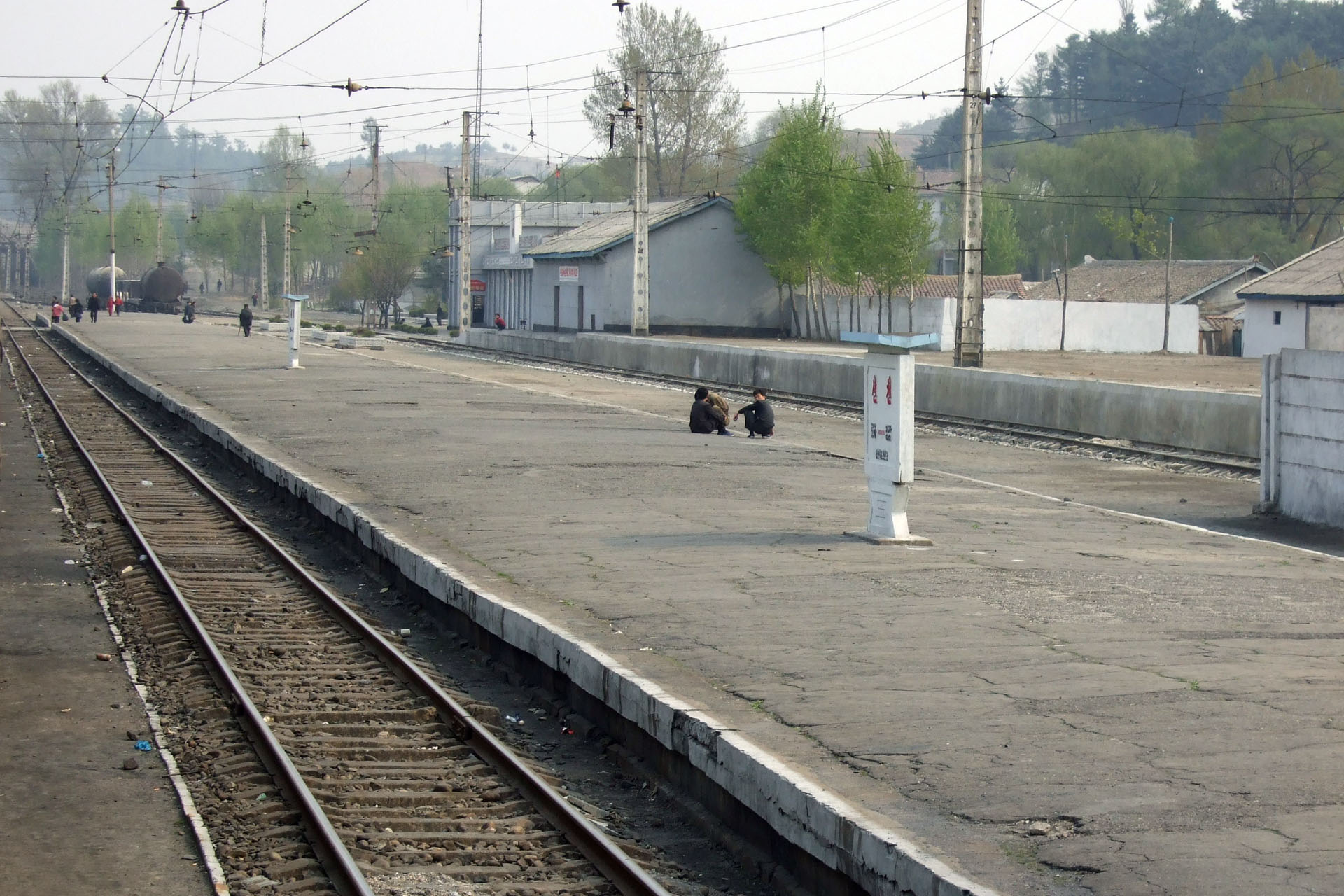
Sonchon-up railway station, May 2007

Sŏnch'ŏn county is served by the P'yŏngŭi Line of the Korean State Railway, which runs between P'yŏngyang and Sinŭiju. In addition, a passenger ferry operates between Sinmido and the mainland.

== Religion ==
In the late 19th and early 20th centuries, the area was a hotbed of Protestant Christian religious activity, with more than 50 churches. There were also 13 Buddhist temples. These were all converted or destroyed following the establishment of the DPRK.

== Protests ==
In February 2011, the area and other cities in North P'yŏngan had rare protests, of a few score of people, calling for adequate provision of rice and power. At the time, news of the Arab Spring was spreading via Chinese TV channels and phone calls with defectors.

== See also ==
- Geography of North Korea
- Administrative divisions of North Korea
- North Pyongan
