= Kopung County =

Coordinates: 40.604°N 125.944°E

Kop'ung County 고풍군
- County

Korean transcription(s)
  - Hanja: 古豊郡
  - McCune-Reischauer: Kop'ung kun
  - Revised Romanization: Gopung-gun
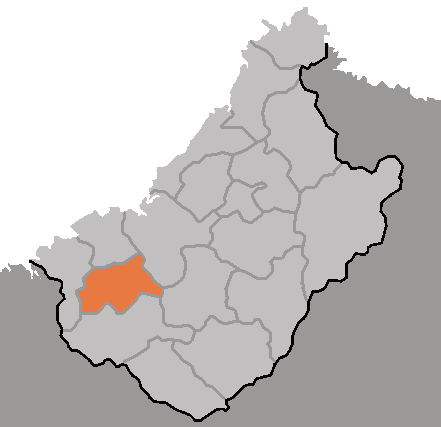
- Map of Chagang showing the location of Kopung
- Country: North Korea
- Province: Chagang Province
- Administrative divisions: 1 ŭp, 12 ri

Area
  - Total: 670 km^{2} (260 sq mi)

Population (2008)
  - Total: 31,572
  - Density: 47/km^{2} (120/sq mi)

Kop'ung County is a kun, or county, in Chagang province, North Korea. Prior to the division of Korea, it was part of Chosan county.

== Geography ==
Most of Kop'ung is mountainous, but lower in the west. The Kangnam and Chogyuryong (적유령산맥) ranges pass through the county. The chief streams are the Chungman River and the Komyonchon, Wolmyongchon, and Pungmyonchon streams. The highest peak is Koamsan. Some 89.4% of the county's area is forestland. There are karstic regions in the county. The Songwon Reservoir is located there.

== Administrative divisions ==
Kop'ung County is divided into 1 ŭp (town) and 12 ri (villages):

- Kop'ung-ŭp
- Mundŏng-ri
- Pangsŏng-ri
- Ryongdae-ri
- Ryongdang-ri
- Ryonggong-ri
- Ryongp'ung-ri
- Ryongsŏng-ri
- Samp'yŏng-ri
- Sinch'ang-ri
- Sŏksang-ri
- Tongdo-ri
- Wŏlmyŏng-ri

== Economy ==
The chief local industry is agriculture, centered on dry-field farming. Crops include maize, soybeans, wheat, barley, radishes, cabbage, gochu peppers, and cucumbers. Orcharding, sericulture, and livestock raising are also carried out. In addition, some rice is cultivated along the valleys of the Chungman and the other streams.

There are deposits of iron, gold, copper, lead, zinc, tungsten, graphite, coal, and limestone, among other minerals. There is relatively little manufacturing.

Kopung is served by roads. The Chungman River is used to ship raw lumber downstream.

== See also ==
- Geography of North Korea
- Administrative divisions of North Korea
- Chagang
