= Nyongwon County =

Nyŏngwŏn County 녕원군
- County

Korean transcription(s)
  - Chosŏn'gŭl: 녕원군
  - Hancha: 寧遠郡
  - McCune-Reischauer: Nyŏngwŏn-gun
  - Revised Romanization: Nyeongwon-gun
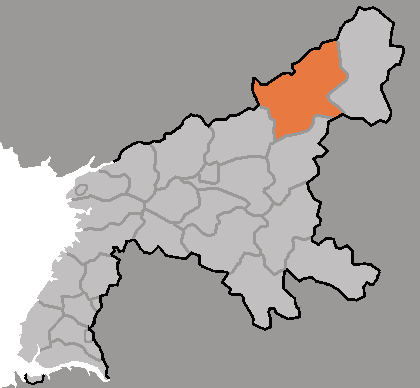
- Map of South Pyongan showing the location of Nyongwon
- Country: North Korea
- Province: South P'yŏngan
- Administrative divisions: 1 ŭp, 1 tong, 23 ri

Nyŏngwŏn County is a county in South P'yŏngan province, North Korea.

== Administrative divisions ==
Nyŏngwŏn county is divided into 1 ŭp (town), 1 tong (neighbourhood) and 23 ri (villages):

- Nyŏngwŏn-ŭp (녕원읍)
- Okch'ŏn-dong (옥천동)
- Changsal-li (장산리)
- Chungsam-ri (중삼리)
- Ch'angsal-li (창산리)
- Ch'ŏngsal-li (청산리)
- Hwiyang-ri (회양리)
- Masal-li (마산리)
- Mungong-ri (문곡리)
- On'yang-ri (온양리)
- P'ungjŏl-li (풍전리)
- Ryongdae-ri (룡대리)
- Ryongsŏl-li (룡성리)
- Sil-li (신리)
- Sindae-ri (신대리)
- Sinhŭng-ri (신흥리)
- Sinmang-ri (신막리)
- Songsal-li (송산리)
- Suha-ri (수하리)
- Sŭngdong-ri (승통리)
- Sunho-ri (순호리)
- Taesŏng-ri (대성리)
- Top'yŏng-ri (도평리)
- Tosam-ri (도삼리)
- Yŏngch'ang-ri (영창리)
