= List of second-level administrative divisions of North Korea =

The second-level divisions of the DPRK as of 2026

This is a list of all second-level administrative divisions of North Korea, including cities, counties, workers' districts, districts or wards, organized by province or directly governed city.

== Pyongyang Directly Governed City ==
- 19 wards (guyok): Chung, Hwasong-guyok, Pyongchon, Potonggang, Moranbong, Sosong, Songyo, Tongdaewon, Taedonggang, Sadong, Taesong, Mangyongdae, Hyongjesan, Ryongsong, Samsok, Ryokpo, Rangnang, Sunan, Unjong
- 2 county (kun): Kangdong, Kangnam

== Rason Special City ==
- 2 ward (guyok): Rajin, Sŏnbong

== Kaesong Special City ==
- 2 ward (guyok): Kaep'ung, P'anmun
- 1 county (kun): Changp'ung

== Chagang Province ==
- 3 cities (si): Kanggye, Hŭich'ŏn, Manp'o
- 15 counties (kun): Changgang, Chasŏng, Chŏnch'ŏn, Ch'osan, Chunggang, Hwap'yŏng, Kop'ung, Rangrim, Ryongrim, Sijung, Sŏnggan, Songwŏn, Tongsin, Usi, Wiwŏn

== North Hamgyong Province ==
- 3 cities (si): Ch'ŏngjin, Hoeryŏng, Kimch'aek
- 12 counties (kun): Myŏnggan, Hwadae, Kilju, Kyŏngsŏng, Musan, Myŏngch'ŏn, Onsŏng, Ŏrang, Puryŏng, Kyŏngwŏn, Kyŏnghŭng, Yŏnsa

== South Hamgyong Province ==
- 4 cities (si): Hamhŭng, Hŭngnam, Sinp'o, Tanch'ŏn
- 1 district (ku): Sudong
- 1 area (chigu): Kŭmho
- 15 counties (kun): Changjin, Chŏngp'yŏng, Hamju, Hŏch'ŏn, Hongwŏn, Kowŏn, Kŭmya, Pujŏn, Pukch'ŏng, Ragwŏn, Riwŏn, Sinhŭng, Tŏksŏng, Yŏnggwang, Yodŏk

== North Hwanghae Province ==
- 2 cities (si): Sariwŏn, Songrim
- 17 counties (kun): Chunghwa, Hwangju, Koksan, Kŭmch'ŏn, Pongsan, P'yŏngsan, Rinsan, Sangwŏn, Singye, Sinp'yŏng, Sŏhŭng, Suan, Sŭngho, T'osan, Ŭnp'a, Yŏnsan, Yŏnt'an

== South Hwanghae Province ==
- 1 city (si): Haeju
- 19 counties (kun): Anak, Chaeryŏng, Changyŏn, Ch'ŏngdan, Kangryong, Kwail, Ongjin, Paech'ŏn, Pongch'ŏn, Pyŏksŏng, Ryongyŏn, Samch'ŏn, Sinch'ŏn, Sinwŏn, Songhwa, T'aet'an, Ŭllyul, Ŭnch'ŏn, Yŏnan

== Kangwon Province ==
- 2 cities (si): Munch'ŏn, Wŏnsan
- 1 special administrative region: Kŭmgangsan Kwan'gwangjigu (Tourist Region)
- 15 counties (kun): Anbyŏn, Ch'angdo, Ch'ŏrwŏn, Ch'ŏnnae, Hoeyang, Ich'ŏn, Kimhwa, Kosan, Kosŏng, Kŭmgang, P'an'gyo, Pŏptong, P'yŏnggang, Sep'o, T'ongch'ŏn

== North Pyongan Province ==
- 3 cities (si): Sinŭiju, Chŏngju, Kusŏng
- 22 counties (kun): Ch'angsŏng, Ch'ŏlsan, Ch'ŏnma, Hyangsan, Kujang, Kwaksan, Nyŏngbyŏn, Pakch'ŏn, P'ihyŏn, Pyŏktong, Ryongch'ŏn, Sakchu, Sindo, Sŏnch'ŏn, T'aech'ŏn, Taegwan, Tongch'ang, Tongrim, Ŭiju, Unjŏn, Unsan, Yŏmju

== South Pyongan Province ==
- 6 cities (si): P'yŏngsŏng, Anju, Kaech'ŏn, Namp'o (City with special status), Sunch'ŏn, Tŏkch'ŏn
- 1 district (ku): Ch'ŏngnam
- 2 districts (chigu): Tŭkchang, Ungok
- 16 counties (kun): Chungsan, Hoech'ang, Maengsan, Mundŏk, Nyŏngwŏn, Pukch'ang, P'yŏngwŏn, Sinyang, Sŏngch'ŏn, Sukch'ŏn, Taedong, Taehŭng, Ŭnsan, Yangdŏk

== Ryanggang Province ==
- 2 cities (si): Hyesan, Samjiyon
- 11 counties (kun): Kapsan, Kimjŏngsuk, Kimhyŏnggwŏn, Kimhyŏngjik, Paegam, Poch'ŏn, P'ungsŏ, Samsu, Taehongdan, Unhŭng

== See also ==
- Administrative divisions of North Korea
