= Pyoktong County =

Pyŏktong County 벽동군
- County

Korean transcription(s)
  - Chosŏn'gŭl: 벽동군
  - Hancha: 碧潼郡
  - McCune-Reischauer: Pyŏktong-gun
  - Revised Romanization: Byeokdong-gun
- Country: North Korea
- Province: North P'yŏngan
- Administrative divisions: 1 ŭp, 19 ri

Area
  - Total: 644.5 km^{2} (248.8 sq mi)

Population (2008)
  - Total: 35,601
  - Density: 55.24/km^{2} (143.1/sq mi)

Pyŏktong County is a kun, or county, in northern North P'yŏngan province, North Korea. It lies in the valley of the Yalu River, and borders China to the north. Within North Korea, it is bounded by Tongch'ang to the south, Ch'angsŏng to the west, and Usi county in Chagang province to the east. It was separated from Usi in 1952, as part of a nationwide reorganization of local government.

== Geography ==
The terrain is steep and mountainous, with the Kangnam and Pinandŏk ranges both passing through the county. The highest point is Piraebong, at 1470 metres. There are various small streams, including the Tongch'ŏn (동천), Songgyech'ŏn (송계천), and Namch'ŏn (남천). These are used to transport cut lumber; and the Namch'ŏn is also used to generate hydroelectric power. Due to the rugged terrain, only seven percent of Pyoktong's area is cultivated, while 80% is forested.

== Administrative divisions ==
Pyŏktong county is divided into 1 ŭp (town) and 19 ri (villages):

- Pyŏktong-ŭp (벽동읍)
- Kwŏnch'ang-ri (권창리)
- Kwŏnsang-ri (권상리)
- Majŏng-ri (마전리)
- Namha-ri (남하리)
- Namsŏ-ri (남서리)
- Namsung-ri (남숭리)
- Ryongp'yŏng-ri (룡평리)
- Sach'ang-ri (사창리)
- Sŏngha-ri (성하리)
- Song'i-ri (송이리)
- Songryŏl-li (송련리)
- Songsa-ri (송사리)
- Songsam-ri (송삼리)
- Sŏngsam-ri (성삼리)
- Taebong-ri (대동리)
- Taep'ung-ri (대풍리)
- Tongha-ri (동하리)
- Tongju-ri (동주리)
- Yŏngp'ung-ri (영풍리)

== Climate ==
The average year-round temperature is 7.1 °C, plunging to a mean of -12.5 °C in January and rising to 23 °C in August. The climate is relatively dry, with an average annual rainfall of 992 mm.

== Economy ==
Forestry is the chief local industry. The farms produce maize, soybeans, sweet potatoes, potatoes, gochu peppers, and hops. Livestock are also raised; Pyŏktong ranks second nationwide in sheep production.

== See also ==
- Geography of North Korea
- Administrative divisions of North Korea
