= Changsong County =

Coordinates: 40.4216°N 125.2455°E

Changsŏng County 창성군
- County

Korean transcription(s)
  - Chosŏn'gŭl: 창성군
  - Hancha: 昌城郡
  - McCune-Reischauer: Ch'angsŏng-gun
  - Revised Romanization: Changseong-gun
- Country: North Korea
- Province: North P'yŏngan
- Administrative divisions: 1 ŭp, 1 workers' districts, 15 ri

Area
  - Total: 605.2 km^{2} (233.7 sq mi)

Population (2008)
  - Total: 26,577
  - Density: 43.91/km^{2} (113.7/sq mi)

Changsŏng County is a kun, or county, in northern North Phyŏngan province, North Korea. It is bordered by Pyŏktong to the east, Tongchang and Taegwan to the south, Sakchu to the west; to the north, it faces China across the Yalu (Amrok) River.

== Name ==
Changsŏng appears as "Changseong" in South Korea's Revised Romanization and as Changcheng in Chinese records, as during its occupation by Mao Wenlong's forces during the Manchu conquest of China.

== Geography ==
Changsŏng's terrain is steep and mountainous, sloping generally downward from the southeast toward the Yalu. The Kangnam Mountains and Pandŏk Mountains both pass through the county. The highest point is Piraebong, at 1470 m. The county is drained by various tributaries of the Yalu, including the Yŏngjuchŏn (영주천) and Namchangchŏn (남창천), as well as by the Changsŏng River, a tributary of the Taeryŏng. The Yalu itself has been blocked by the Suphung Dam to create Suphung Lake.

== Administrative divisions ==
Changsŏng county is divided into 1 ŭp (town). 1 rodongjagu (workers' district) and 15 ri (villages):

- Changsŏng-ŭp (창성읍)
- Yujŏn-rodongjagu (유전로동자구)
- Hwidŏk-ri (회덕리)
- Insan-ri (인산리)
- Kaksŏng-ri (각성리)
- Kŭmya-ri (금야리)
- Okpho-ri (옥포리)
- Ŏsin-ri (어신리)
- Pongchŏn-ri (봉천리)
- Phungdŏk-ri (풍덕리)
- Sinphyŏng-ri (신평리)
- Talsan-ri (달산리)
- Ŭisan-ri (의산리)
- Wanphung-ri (완풍리)
- Yaksu-ri (약수리)
- Yuphyŏng-ri (유평리)
- Yŏnphung-ri (연풍리)

== Climate ==
Annual rainfall in Changsŏng is 1000 mm, with an annual average temperature of 7.3 °C (the average fluctuating from -11.6 °C in January to 22 °C in August). Temperatures are of course much colder in the mountains, with the snows atop Piraebong not melting until late May. Fog is common near Suphung Lake. Some 80% of the county's land is forested, while only 6.1% is under cultivation.

== Economy ==
Sericulture is widely practised; other crops include maize, rice, peanuts, gochu peppers, sweet potatoes, and various fruits. Changsŏng also leads the county in the production of sheep. Various products, including lumber and medicinal herbs, are harvested from the forests. In addition, gold, tungsten, and coal are mined from the hills. Local manufactured products include gochujang and alcohol.

== Transportation ==
There are no railroads, but a road does connect Changsŏng to Sakchu, Tongchang, and Pyŏktong. Freight and passenger traffic is also carried by ships plying Lake Suphung; the lake is also used to transport raw lumber.

== See also ==
- Geography of North Korea
- Administrative divisions of North Korea
- North Pyongan
