= Kusong =

Kusong 구성시
- Municipal City

Korean transcription(s)
  - Chosŏn'gŭl: 구성시
  - Hancha: 龜城市
  - McCune-Reischauer: Kusŏng si
  - Revised Romanization: Guseong-si
- Kusong City Hospital

- Map of North Pyongan showing the location of Kusong
- Interactive map of Kusong
- Location within North Korea
- Coordinates: 39°58′N 125°10′E
- Country: North Korea
- Province: North Pyongan Province
- Administrative divisions: 24 tong, 18 ri

Area
  - Total: 666.8 km^{2} (257.5 sq mi)

Population (2008)
  - Total: 196,515
  - Dialect: P'yŏngan
- Time zone: UTC+9 (Pyongyang Time)

Kusŏng (Korean: 구성; Korean pronunciation: [ku.sʌŋ]) is a city in central North Pyongan province, North Korea.

It borders Taegwan to the north, Taechon to the east, Kwaksan and Chongju to the south, and Chonma to the west. The highest point is Chongryongsan (청룡산, 920 m).

Educational institutions located in Kusong include Kusong Mechanical College and Kusong Industrial College. Historical relics include the Koryo dynasty-era Kuju Castle.

Panghyon-dong, an exclave of Pyongyang, was formerly part of Kusong.

== Industry ==
Kusong is also home to much of North Korea's military industry, with both munitions factories and uranium mines in the area. The No.112, also known as the January 12th Factory, was the site of the first successful Hwasong-12 launch, with a memorial dedicated to the successful launch nearby.

The Panghyon airfield is also located by Kusong, which is a site of missile test launches, including the first successful ICBM test launch by the DPRK.

Kusong is home to the Machine Plant managed by Ho Chol Yong, a large factory that produces tracked vehicles and tanks. This factory saw multiple extensions to it in 2016 and 2020. The factories' expansion is reflected on the increasing use of tracked transporter erector launchers.

== Climate ==
The year-round average temperature is 8.2 °C, with a January average of -9.6 °C and an August average of 23.3 °C. 1300 millimeters of rain fall in a typical year. 22% of the county's area is cultivated; 64% is forested.

Climate data for Kusong (1991–2020)
Month	Jan	Feb	Mar	Apr	May	Jun	Jul	Aug	Sep	Oct	Nov	Dec	Year
Mean daily maximum °C (°F)	−0.7 (30.7)	2.3 (36.1)	8.8 (47.8)	16.9 (62.4)	23.1 (73.6)	26.8 (80.2)	28.4 (83.1)	29.2 (84.6)	25.7 (78.3)	18.5 (65.3)	8.5 (47.3)	0.2 (32.4)	15.6 (60.1)
Daily mean °C (°F)	−6.6 (20.1)	−3.4 (25.9)	2.7 (36.9)	10.1 (50.2)	16.4 (61.5)	21.1 (70.0)	24.1 (75.4)	24.2 (75.6)	19.1 (66.4)	11.6 (52.9)	3.0 (37.4)	−4.9 (23.2)	9.8 (49.6)
Mean daily minimum °C (°F)	−11.7 (10.9)	−8.6 (16.5)	−2.4 (27.7)	3.8 (38.8)	10.4 (50.7)	16.3 (61.3)	20.5 (68.9)	20.3 (68.5)	13.9 (57.0)	5.9 (42.6)	−1.6 (29.1)	−9.4 (15.1)	4.8 (40.6)
Average precipitation mm (inches)	6.1 (0.24)	17.7 (0.70)	23.3 (0.92)	53.5 (2.11)	87.6 (3.45)	123.0 (4.84)	342.4 (13.48)	312.6 (12.31)	91.8 (3.61)	52.6 (2.07)	55.2 (2.17)	16.6 (0.65)	1,182.4 (46.55)
Average precipitation days (≥ 0.1 mm)	2.8	3.7	4.1	5.8	8.0	9.1	12.2	10.8	6.3	6.0	6.4	5.7	80.9
Average snowy days	3.3	3.1	2.1	0.3	0.0	0.0	0.0	0.0	0.0	0.0	1.9	4.4	15.1
Average relative humidity (%)	63.9	62.7	63.3	64.1	69.2	76.6	84.1	82.5	75.0	70.5	70.2	67.5	70.8
Source: Korea Meteorological Administration

== Administrative divisions ==
The city is divided into 24 neighborhoods (dong) and 18 villages (ri).Panghyŏn-dong
(방현동/方峴洞), a missile industry area, used to be part of the city but it was later transferred to the administration under Pyongyang city in 2018 and is now not part of the city.

- Ch'ahŭng 1-dong
  (차흥1동/車興一洞)
- Ch'ahŭng 2-dong
  (차흥2동/車興二洞)
- Ch'ŏngnyŏn-dong
  (청년동/靑年洞)
- Kwail-dong
  (과일동/과일洞)
- Namch'ang-dong
  (남창동/南昌洞)
- Namsan-dong
  (남산동/南山洞)
- Paeg'un-dong
  (백운동/白雲洞)
- Paeksŏk-tong
  (백석동/白石洞)
- Pangjik-tong
  (방직동/紡織洞)
- Rigu-dong
  (리구동/梨邱洞)
- Saegol-dong
  (새골동/새골洞)
- Saenal-dong
  (새날동/새날洞)
- Sangdan-dong
  (상단동/上端洞)
- Sangsŏk-tong
  (상석동/上石洞)
- Sinhŭng 1-dong
  (신흥1동/新興一洞)
- Sinhŭng 2-dong
  (신흥2동/新興二洞)
- Sŏngan-dong
  (성안동/城安洞)
- Sŏsan-dong
  (서산동/西山洞)
- Sŏsŏng-dong
  (서성동/西城洞)
- Tongmun-dong
  (동문동/東門洞)
- Un'yang-dong
  (운양동/雲陽洞
- Yaksu-dong
  (약수동/藥水洞)
- Yangha-dong
  (양하동/陽下洞)
- Yŏkchŏn-dong
  (역전동/驛前洞)
- Choyang-ri
  (조양리/朝陽里)
- Chungbang-ri
  (중방리/中坊里)
- Ch'ŏngryong-ri
  (청룡리/靑龍里)
- Ch'ŏngsong-ri
  (청송리/靑松里)
- Kiryong-ri
  (기룡리/氣龍里)
- Kŭmp'ung-ri
  (금풍리/金風里)
- Kŭmsal-li
  (금산리/金山里)
- Namhŭng-ri
  (남흥리/南興里)
- Namsal-li
  (남산리/南山里)
- Obong-ri
  (오봉리/五峰里)
- Paeksang-ri
  (백상리/白上里)
- Palsal-li
  (발산리/鉢山里
- Ryongp'ung-ri
- Sinp'ung-ri
  (신풍리/新豊里)
- Taeal-li
  (대안리/大安里)
- Tongsal-li
  (동산리/東山里)
- Unp'ung-ri
  (운풍리/雲豊里)
- Wŏnjil-li
  (원진리/元鎭里)

== See also ==
- Geography of North Korea
- Administrative divisions of North Korea
- North Pyongan
