= Chosan County =

Coordinates: 40°36′11″N 125°18′22″E

Chosan County 초산군
- County

Korean transcription(s)
  - Hanja: 楚山郡
  - McCune-Reischauer: Ch'osan kun
  - Revised Romanization: Chosan-gun
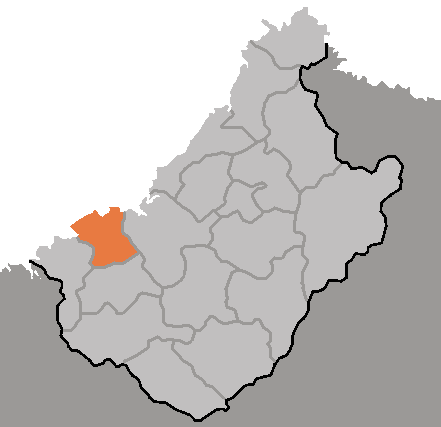
- Map of Chagang showing the location of Chosan
- Country: North Korea
- Province: Chagang Province
- Administrative divisions: 1 ŭp, 18 ri

Area
  - Total: 550 km^{2} (210 sq mi)

Population (2008)
  - Total: 43,614
  - Density: 79/km^{2} (210/sq mi)

Ch'osan County is a kun, or county, in Chagang province, North Korea. It borders the People's Republic of China to the north.

The terrain slopes downward from the Kangnam Mountains in the south to the Yalu River in the north. The highest peak is Namhaetaesan (남해태산, 1,079 m). Some 20% of the land is arable, with animal husbandry and beekeeping playing important roles. 76.1% of the land is forested, and thus logging also contributes to the local economy.

The climate is continental, with hot summers and cold winters. The highest temperature recorded in North Korea, 41 °C, was recorded in the county in July 1961.

During the Korean War on October 26, 1950, Republic of Korea forces reached the Yalu River at Chosan, shortly before the massive Chinese counterattack.

The Chosan Revolutionary Site is associated with Kim Hyong-jik. He visited Chosan several times and met with members of the Korean National Association. The site includes the Paesin School.

In 1999, a complex of Koguryo tombs was excavated in Chosan.

== Administrative divisions ==
Ch'osan County is divided into 1 ŭp (town) and 18 ri (villages):

=== County seat (ŭp) ===
MR Name	RR Name	Hangul
Ch'osan-ŭp	Chosan-eup	초산읍

=== Villages (ri) ===
MR Name	RR Name	Hangul
Angt'o-ri	Angto-ri	앙토리
Changt'o-ri	Changto-ri	창토리
Ching-ri	Ching-ri	칭리
Chungsang-ri	Jungsang-ri	중상리
Hasil-li	Hasil-ri	하실리
Hwagŏl-li	Hwageol-ri	화걸리
Kup'yŏng-ri	Gupyeong-ri	구평리
Kuryong-ri	Guryong-ri	구룡리
Risal-li	Risal-ri	리살리
Ryongsang-ri	Ryongsang-ri	룡상리
Ryŏnp'ung-ri	Ryeonpung-ri	련풍리
Sinyangsong-ri	Sinyangsong-ri	신양송리
Song'ul-li	Songul-ri	송울리
Such'im-ri	Suchim-ri	수침리
Unp'yŏng-ri	Unpyeong-ri	운평리
Wail-li	Wail-ri	와일리
Yŏn'u-ri	Yeon-u-ri	연우리

== See also ==
- Geography of North Korea
- Administrative divisions of North Korea
