= North Pyongan Province =

Province of North Korea

North Pyongan Province 평안북도
- Province

Korean transcription(s)
  - Chosŏn'gŭl: 평안북도
  - Hancha: 平安北道
  - McCune–Reischauer: P'yŏnganbuk-to
  - Revised Romanization: Pyeonganbuk-do
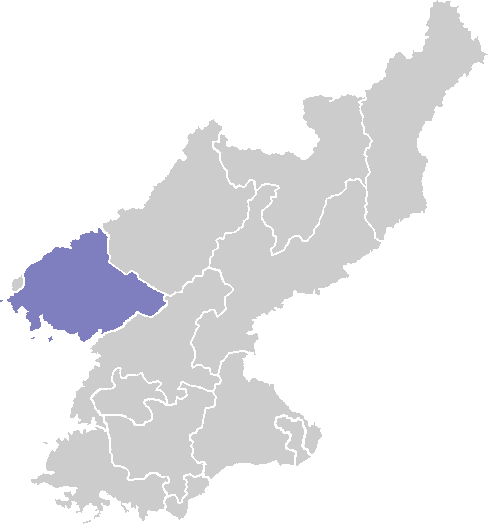
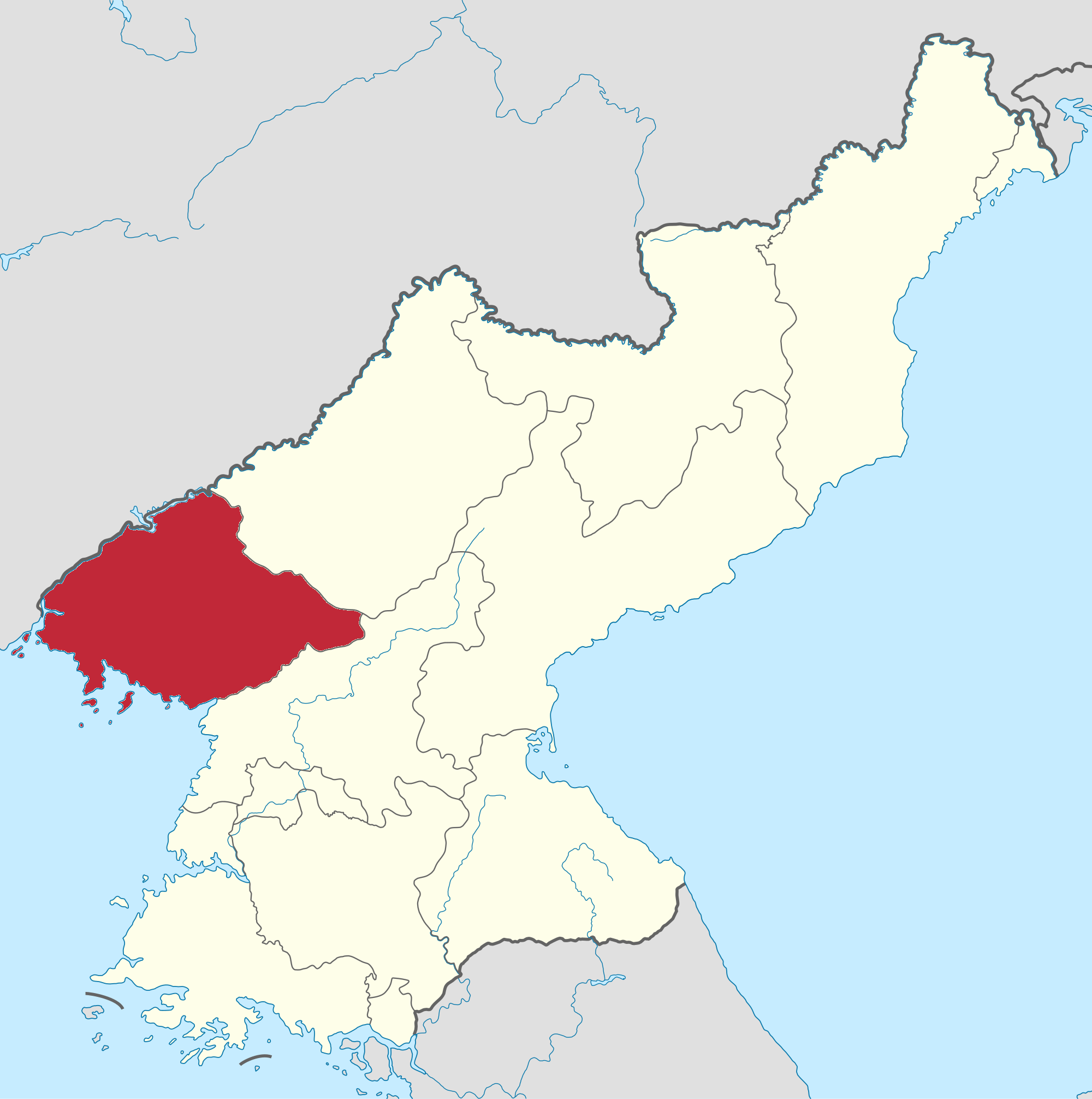
- Maps showing North Pyongan both with and without the Sinuiju Special Administrative Region
- Coordinates: 40.1°N 124.4°E
- Country: North Korea
- Region: Kwansŏ
- Capital: Sinŭiju
- Subdivisions: 3 cities; 22 counties

Government
  - Provincial Party Committee Chief Secretary: Kim Cheol-sam (WPK)
  - Provincial People's Committee Chairman: Choi Young-man

Area
  - Total: 12,191 km^{2} (4,707 sq mi)

Population (2008)
  - Total: 2,728,662
  - Density: 223.83/km^{2} (579.71/sq mi)
- Time zone: UTC+09:00 (Pyongyang Time)
- Dialect: P'yŏngan

North Pyongan Province (also spelled North P'yŏngan; Korean: 평안북도; MR: Phyŏnganbukto; IPA: [pʰjʌŋanbuk̚t͈o]) is a western province of North Korea. The province was formed in 1896 from the northern half of the former P'yŏng'an Province, remained a province of Korea until 1945, then became a province of North Korea. Its capital is Sinŭiju.

== Geography ==
The Yalu River forms the northern border with China's Liaoning province. The province is also bordered to the east by Chagang Province and to the south by South Pyong'an Province. The Sinŭiju Special Administrative Region is located in the western corner of the province, and was created as an administrative entity separate from North Pyongan in 2002. North Pyongan is surrounded by water to the west with the Korea Bay and the Yellow Sea.

== Administrative divisions ==
North Pyongan is divided into 3 cities (si) and 21 counties (kun). Each entity is listed below in English, Chosŏn'gŭl, and Hancha.

Name	Chosŏn'gŭl	Hancha	Population (2008)	Subdivisions
City
Chongju	정주시	定州市	189,742	14 dong, 18 ri
Kusong	구성시	龜城市	196,515	25 dong, 18 ri
Sinuiju (capital)	신의주시	新義州市	359,341	49 dong, 9 ri
County
Changsong County	창성군	昌城郡	26,577	1 up, 1 rodongjagu, 15 ri
Cholsan County	철산군	鐵山郡	85,525	1 up, 2 rodongjagu, 25 ri
Chonma County	천마군	天摩郡	50,462	1 up, 20 ri
Kujang County	구장군	球場郡	139,337	1 up, 5 rodongjagu, 22 ri
Kwaksan County	곽산군	郭山郡	97,660	1 up, 19 ri
Nyongbyon County	녕변군	寧邊郡	113,852	1 up, 1 rodongjagu, 26 ri
Pakchon County	박천군	博川郡	98,128	1 up, 1 rodongjagu, 20 ri
Pihyon County	피현군	枇峴郡	110,637	1 up, 2 rodongjagu, 21 ri
Pyoktong County	벽동군	碧潼郡	35,601	1 up, 19 ri
Ryongchon County	룡천군	龍川郡	135,634	1 up, 3 rodongjagu, 19 ri
Sakju County	삭주군	朔州郡	159,707	1 up, 6 rodongjagu, 18 ri
Sindo County	신도군	薪島郡	11,810	1 up, 2 rodongjagu, 1 ri
Sonchon County	선천군	宣川郡	126,350	1 up, 24 ri
Taechon County	태천군	泰川郡	108,894	1 up, 1 rodongjagu, 21 ri
Taegwan County	대관군	大館郡	69,565	1 up, 22 ri
Tongchang County	동창군	東倉郡	28,665	1 up, 1 rodongjagu, 16 ri
Tongrim County	동림군	東林郡	104,614	1 up, 2 rodongjagu, 20 ri
Uiju County	의주군	義州郡	110,018	1 up, 2 rodongjagu, 17 ri
Unjon County	운전군	雲田郡	101,130	1 up, 25 ri
Unsan County	운산군	雲山郡	102,928	1 up, 1 rodongjagu, 27 ri
Yomju County	염주군	鹽州郡	113,620	1 up, 1 rodongjagu, 22 ri

In 2002, Sinŭiju Special Administrative Region—near the city of Sinuiju—was envisioned as a separately governed Special Administrative Region, but the project has yet to be put into effect.

== Gallery ==
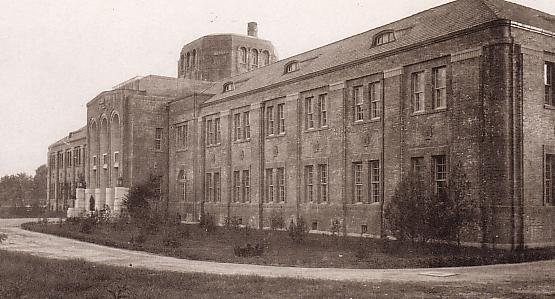
North Pyongan Provincial Office during Japanese rule in Korea, administering the Province as Heianhoku-dō

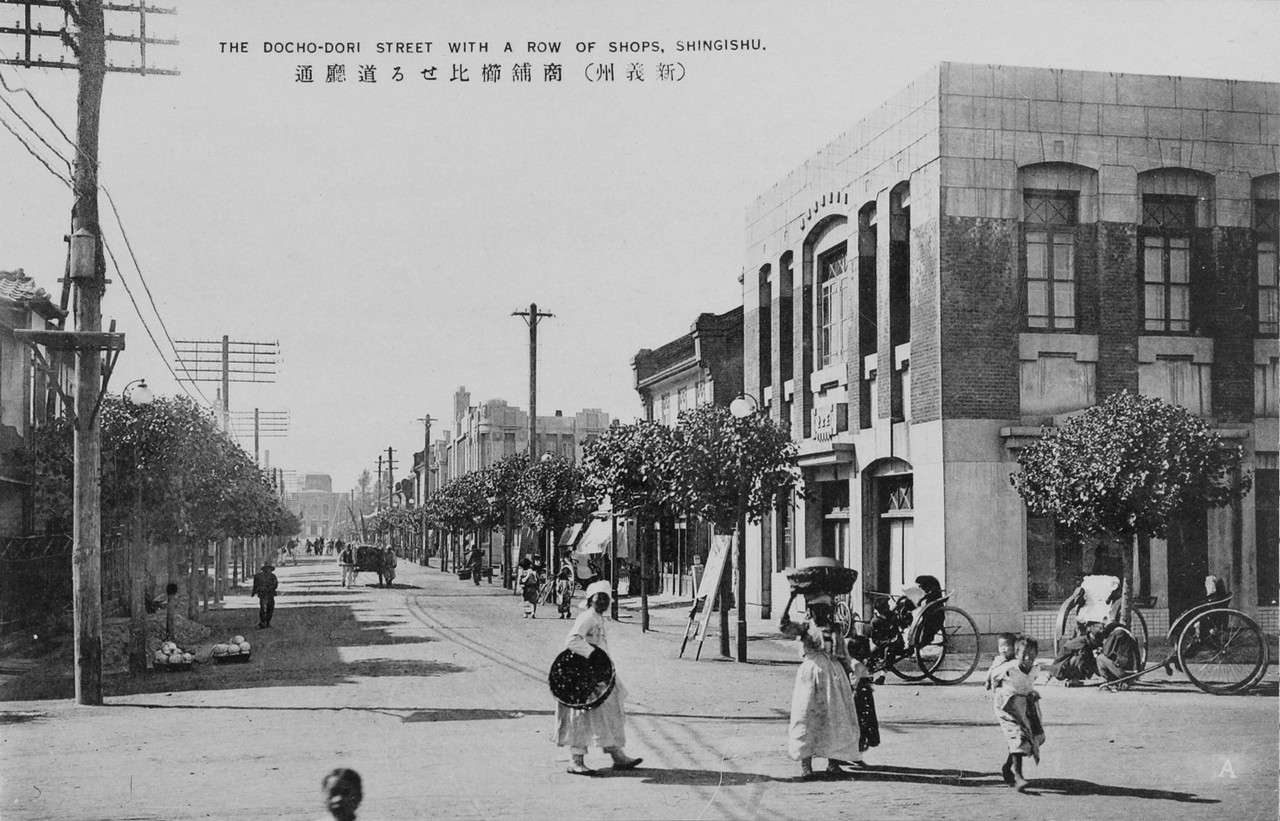
A street in Sinuiju when it was under Japanese control

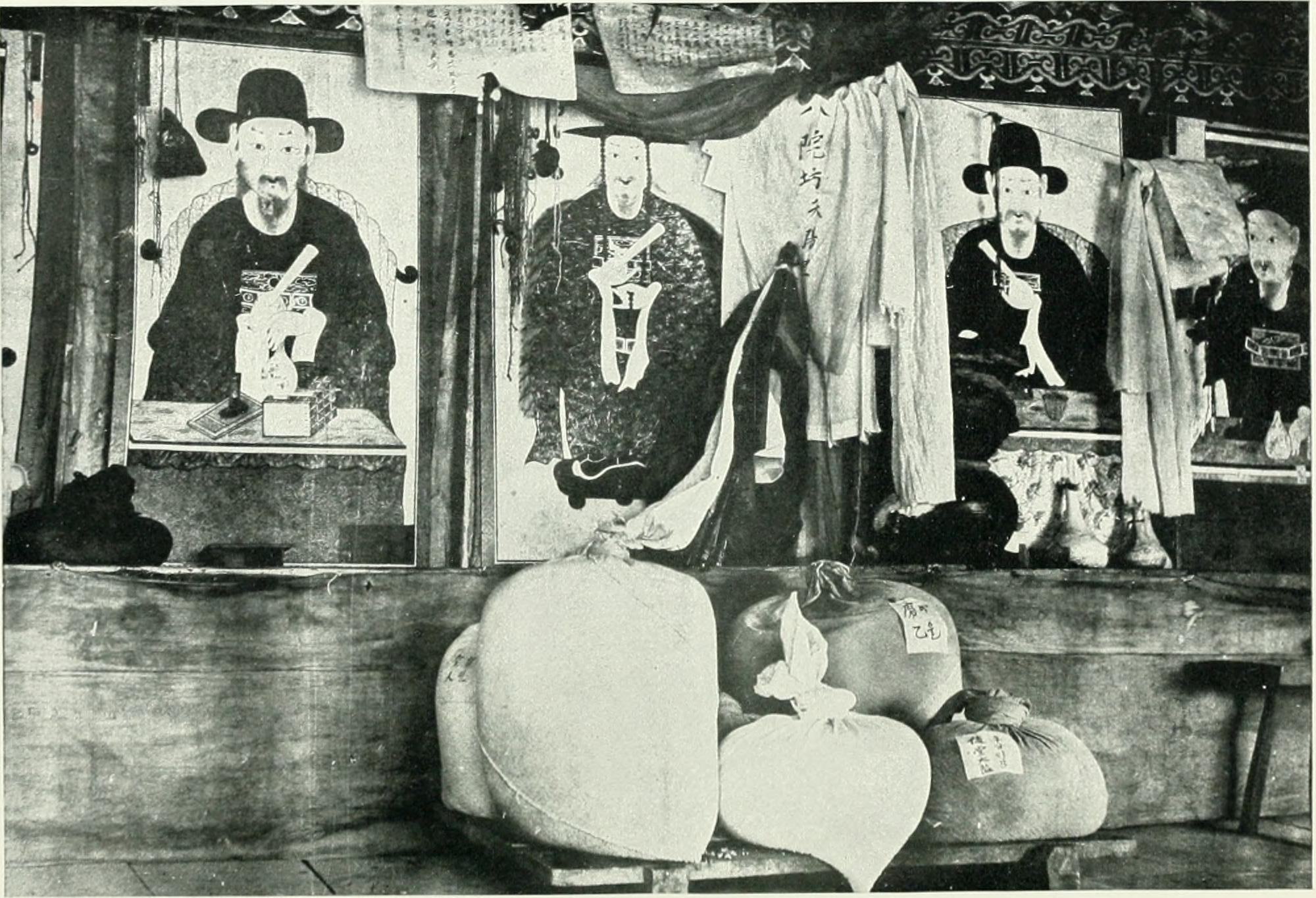
A Korean Confucianist temple with offerings in Sinuiju, circa 1909

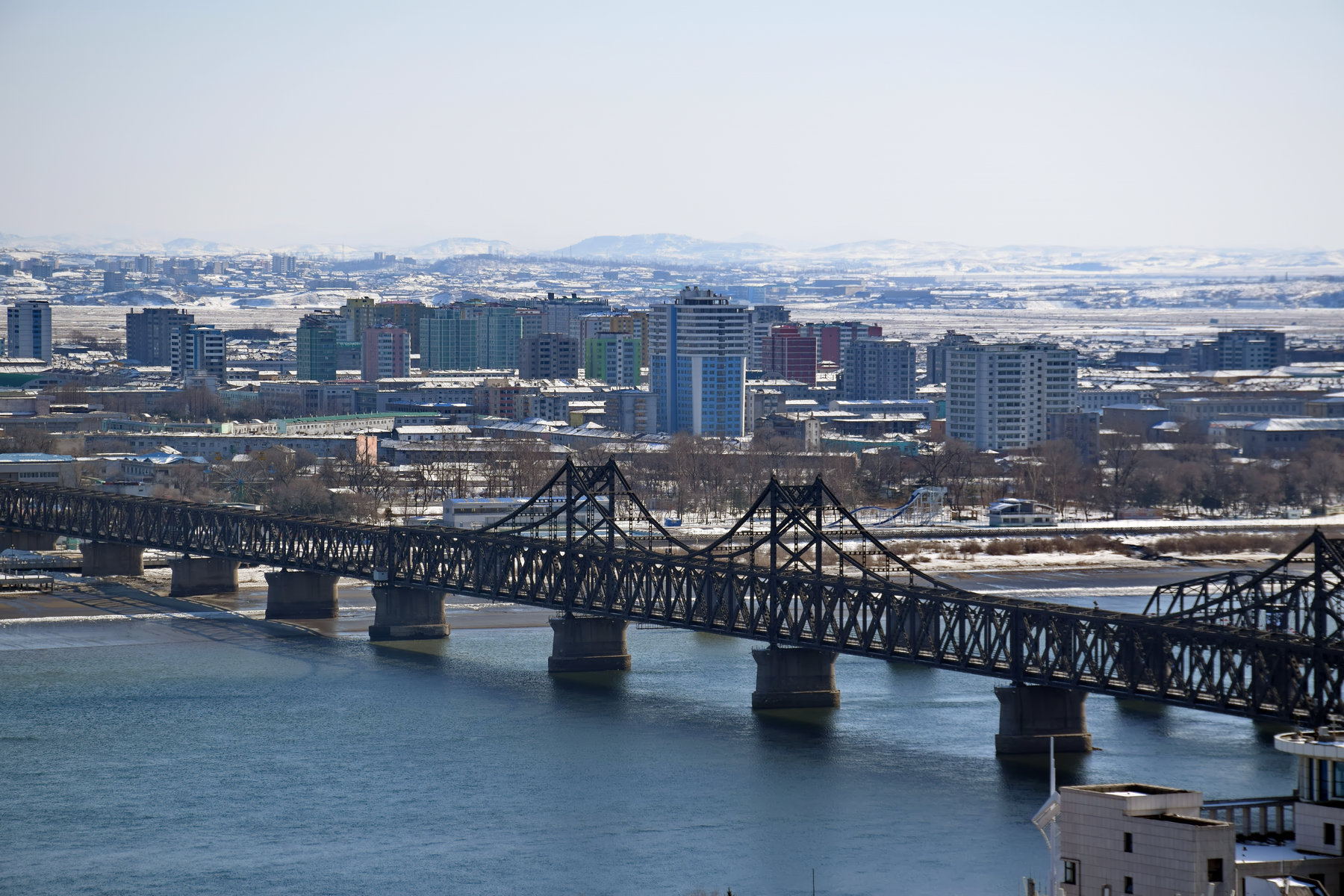
An aerial view of downtown Sinuiju - North Pyongan's capital

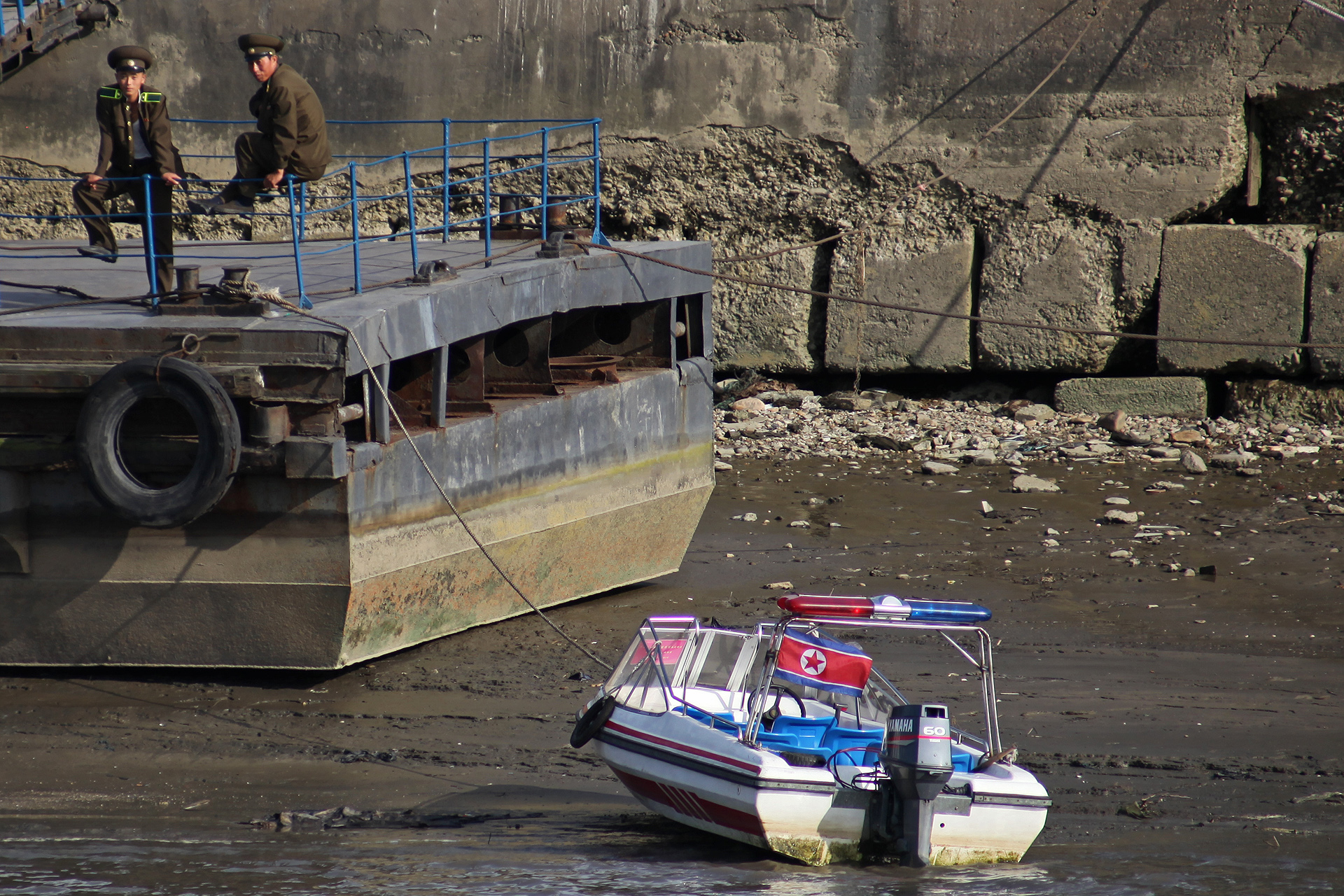
The North Korean Coastguard in Sinuiju
