= Administrative divisions of North Korea =

The administrative divisions of North Korea are organized into three hierarchical levels. These divisions were created in 2002. Many of the units have equivalents in the system of South Korea. At the highest level are nine provinces and four special cities. (Note: Following the formal abandonment of peaceful reunification goals in 2024, the government of North Korea no longer maintains administrative claims over the territory of South Korea as 'unrecovered' provinces.) The second-level divisions are cities, counties, and districts. These are further subdivided into third-level entities: towns (ŭp), neighborhoods (tong), villages (ri), and workers' districts (rodongjagu).

The three-level administrative system used in North Korea was first inaugurated by Kim Il Sung in 1952, as part of a massive restructuring of local government. Previously, the country had used a multi-level system similar to that still used in South Korea.

(The English translations are not official, but approximations. Names are romanized according to the McCune-Reischauer system as officially used in North Korea; the editor was also guided by the spellings used on the 2003 National Geographic map of Korea.)

== First-level divisions ==
The nine provinces (to; Korean: 도; Hanja: 道) derive from the traditional provinces of Korea, but have been further subdivided since the division of Korea. They are large areas including cities, rural and mountainous regions. The four special cities (t'ŭkpyŏlsi; 특별시; 特別市) are large metropolitan cities that have been separated from their former provinces to become first-level units. Four other cities have been directly governed in the past, but were subsequently reunited with their provinces or otherwise reorganized.

The three special administrative regions were all created in 2002 for the development of collaborative ventures with South Korea and other countries. One of them, the Sinuiju Special Administrative Region, was intended to draw Chinese investment and enterprise, but as of 2006 appears never to have been implemented. The special administrative regions do not have any known second- and third-level subdivisions.

Map	Code	Name	Chosŏn'gŭl	Hanja
Special cities
	KP-01	Pyongyang City	평양시	平壤市
	KP-13	Rason City	라선시	羅先市
	KP-14	Nampo City	남포시	南浦市
	KP-15	Kaesong City	개성시	開城市
Provinces
	KP-02	South Pyongan Province	평안남도	平安南道
	KP-03	North Pyongan Province	평안북도	平安北道
	KP-04	Chagang Province	자강도	慈江道
	KP-05	South Hwanghae Province	황해남도	黃海南道
	KP-06	North Hwanghae Province	황해북도	黃海北道
	KP-07	Kangwon Province	강원도	江原道
	KP-08	South Hamgyong Province	함경남도	咸鏡南道
	KP-09	North Hamgyong Province	함경북도	咸鏡北道
	KP-10	Ryanggang Province	량강도	兩江道

== Second-level divisions ==
See List of second-level administrative divisions of North Korea for a complete list.

North Korea's second-level divisions

The most common second-level division is the county (kun; 군; 郡), a less urbanized area within a province or directly governed city. The more populous districts within provinces are cities (si; 시; 市).

The city centers of the directly governed cities are organized into districts (kuyŏk, equivalent to South Korean gu).

== Third-level divisions ==
Rural parts of cities and counties are organized into villages (ri, 리; 里). The downtown areas within cities are divided into neighborhoods (tong, 동; 洞), and a populous part of a county forms a town (ŭp, 읍; 邑). Some counties also have workers' districts (rodongjagu, 로동자구; 勞動者區).

== See also ==
- ISO 3166-2:KP, ISO codes for cities, regions, and provinces in North Korea
- Administrative divisions of South Korea
  - Committee for the Five Northern Korean Provinces
- Provinces of Korea

== Sources ==
- Panorama of the Democratic People's Republic of Korea
- 행정구역 현황 ("Haengjeong Guyeok Hyeonhwang") (Chosun Ilbo)
- 행정구역 개편 일지 ("Haengjeong Guyeok Gaepyeon Ilji") (Chosun Ilbo)
