= Cultural assets of North Korea =

- Chosŏn'gŭl: 조선민주주의인민공화국보존급
- Hancha: 朝鮮民主主義人民共和國保存級
- Revised Romanization: Joseon-minjujuui-inmin-gonghwaguk-bojongeup
- McCune–Reischauer: Chosŏn-minjujuŭi-inmin-konghwaguk-pojon'gŭp

Designated cultural assets of North Korea (Conservation-grade relics) are tangible artifacts, sites, and buildings deemed to have significant historical or artistic value. They are not, however, considered important enough to merit designation as a national treasure.The following list is what was known as of 2005. How the numbering systems work in classifications after the new 2015 law is uncertain.

== No. 1-100 ==
	Name	Location	Chosŏn'gŭl	Hanja
1	Hyonmumun	Moranbong Park, Pyongyang	현무문	玄武門
2	Chunghwa Provincial School	Chunghwa-up	중화향교	中和鄕校
3	Kaema Tomb	Nosan-dong, Samsok-guyok, Pyongyang	개마총	鎧馬塚
4	Nae-ri Tomb No. 1	Changsuwon-dong, Samsok-guyok, Pyongyang	내리1호분	內里一號墳
5	Koguryo Tomb at Nae-ri	Changsuwon-dong, Samsok-guyok, Pyongyang	내리고구려무덤	內里高句麗古墳
6	Group of Koguryo tombs at Topo-ri	Changsuwon-dong, Samsok-guyok, Pyongyang	토포리고구려고분군	土浦里高句麗古墳群
7	Group of Koguryo tombs on Mt. Kwangdae	Changsuwon-dong, Samsok-guyok, Pyongyang	광대산고구려고분군	廣大山高句麗古墳群
8	Todok-ri Saemgol Koguryo Tomb	Todok-ri, Samsok-guyok, Pyongyang	도덕리샘골고구려무덤	道德里샘골高句麗古墳
9	Group of tombs at Kwangdok-ri	Kwangdok-ri, Samsok-guyok, Pyongyang	광덕리고분군	廣德里古墳群
11	Ryonggung-ri Mudanggol Tomb	Ryonggung-ri, Ryongsong-guyok, Pyongyang	룡궁리무당골무덤	龍宮里巫堂谷古墳
12	Group of tombs on Mt. Wolbong in Chonggye-dong	Chonggye-ri, Ryongsong-guyok, Pyongyang	청계동월봉산고분군	清溪洞月峯山古墳群
13	Nodong-ri Hachon Koguryo Tomb	Nodong-ri, Sangwon-gun	로동리하촌고구려무덤	蘆洞里下村高句麗古墳
14	Jang-ri Dolmen	Jang-ri, Sangwon-gun	장리고인돌	場里支石墓
15	Jiksong-ri Dolmen	Nodong-ri, Sangwon-gun	직송리고인돌	직송里支石墓
16	Hasanggol Dolmen	Nodong-ri, Sangwon-gun	하상골고인돌	下上谷支石墓
17	Ryonggok-ri Dolmen	Ryonggok-ri, Sangwon-gun	룡곡리고인돌	龍谷里支石墓
19	Kwiil-ri Dolmen	Kwiil-ri, Sangwon-gun	귀일리고인돌	貴逸里支石墓
20	Choktu Fortress	Sonnae-dong, Mangyongdae-guyok, Pyongyang	적두산성	赤頭山城
21	Nakrang Earthen Castle	Nakrang-guyok, Pyongyang	낙랑토성	樂浪土城
22	Tong-gumgangamsa Buddhist temple	Osan-ri, Sunan-guyok, Pyongyang	동금강암사	東金剛庵寺
23	Pophungsa Buddhist temple	Sinsong-ri, Pyongwon-gun	법흥사	法興寺
24	Site of Popryonsa Buddhist temple	Yongchang-ri, Nyongwon-gun	법련사터	法蓮寺址
26	Group of dolmen on Mt. Sokchon	Ryonggang-gun, Nampo	석천산고인돌고분군	石泉山支石墓古墳群
27	Ssangun-ri Dolmen	Ssangun-ri, Sukchon-gun	쌍운리고인돌	雙雲里支石墓
28	Pyongsan-ri Dolmen	Pyongsan-ri, Sukchon-gun	평산리고인돌	平山里支石墓
32	Sokta-ri Dolmen	Sokta-ri, Chungsan-gun	석다리고인돌	石多里支石墓
34	Sinyang Dolmen	Sinyang-up	신양고인돌	新陽支石墓
35	Munmyong-ri Dolmen	Munmyong-ri, Sinyang-gun	문명리고인돌	文明里支石墓
37	Hutan-ri Menhir	Hutan-ri, Pyongsong	후탄리선돌	厚灘里立石
38	Ryongi-ri Dolmen	Wonam-ri, Pyongsong	룡이리고인돌	룡이里支石墓
42	Songchon Dolmen	Songchon-up	성천고인돌	成川支石墓
44	Hwagang-ri Dolmen	Hwagang-ri, Kangdong-gun, Pyongyang	화강리고인돌	花岡里支石墓
45	Munhung-ri Dolmen	Munhung-ri, Kangdong-gun, Pyongyang	문흥리고인돌	文興里支石墓
48	Demon Hag Rock	Tokpo-ri, Pyongwon-gun	마귀할미바위	魔鬼할미바위
49	Sinam Dolmen	Naenam-ri, Sunchon	신암고인돌	新巖支石墓
52	Nine-story pagoda of Anguksa Buddhist temple	Ponghak-dong, Pyongsong	안국사9층탑	安國寺九層塔
53	Banner pillars of Chabisa Buddhist temple	Osan-ri, Sunan-guyok, Pyongyang	자비사당간지주	慈悲寺幢竿支柱
54	Five-story pagoda of Chaboksa Buddhist temple	Songchon-up	자복사5층탑	慈福寺五層塔
56	Chungsan Pagoda	Chungsan-up	증산읍탑	甑山邑塔
57	Unsan Five-Story Pagoda	Unsan-up (South Pyongan)	은산오층탑	殷山五層塔
58	Nine-Story pagoda of Taerimsa Buddhist temple	Kuup-ri, Kaechon	대림사구층탑	大林寺九層塔
59	Heavenly King & Earth God Tomb	Pukchang-ri, Sunchon	천왕지신총	天王地神塚
60	Yodongsong Tomb	Ryongbong-ri, Sunchon	요동성총	遼東城塚
61	Ryonggang Great Tomb	Ryonggang-up, Nampo	룡강대총	龍岡大塚
62	Taean-ri Tomb #1	Sammyo-ri, Kangso-gun	대안리1호무덤	大安里一號古墳
63	Lotus Blossom Tomb	Taesong-ri, Kangso-gun	련화총	蓮花塚
64	Chongsan-ri Kumganggol Tomb	Chongsan-ri, Kangso-gun	청산리금강골무덤	青山里金剛谷古墳
65	Hunting Tomb	Hwado-ri, Waudo-guyok, Nampo	수렵총	狩獵塚
66	Kamsin Tomb	Sinryong-ri, Waudo-guyok, Nampo	감신무덤	감신古墳
67	Star Tomb	Sinryong-ri, Nampo	성총	星塚
68	Group of tombs at Puam Village in Sinryong-ri	Sinryong-ri, Waudo-guyok, Nampo	신령리부암마고분군	新寧里父岩村古墳群
69	Group of tombs in Pae Valley in Sokta-ri	Sokta-ri, Chungsan-gun	석다리배골고분군	石多里배골古墳群
72	Mago Castle	Munhwa-ri, Kangdong-gun, Pyongyang	마고성	麻故城
73	Kangdong Castle	Ponghwa-ri, Kangdong-gun, Pyongyang	강동읍성	江東邑城
74	Hojon Castle	Changhung-ri, Sukchon-gun	호전성	虎田城
75	Yangam Castle	Sangsong-ri, Yangdok-gun	양암성	陽巖城
76	Hamjong Fortress	Hamjong-ri, Chungsan-gun	함종산성	咸從山城
78	Kosa Fortress	Mukbang-dong, Kaechon	고사산성	姑射山城
81	Maengju Fortress	Maengsan-gun	맹주산성	孟州山城
82	Hoeam Fortress	Songchon-up	회암산성	檜巖山城
83	Hulgol Fortress	Songchon-up	흘골산성	紇骨山城
85	Yangma Fortress	Masan-ri, Nyongwon-gun	양마산성	養馬山城
87	Oul-dong Earthen Castle	Songhyon-ri, Onchon-gun	어을동토성	於乙洞土城
88	Onmu Pavilion	Yongbyon	언무루	偃武樓
89	North water gate of Cholong Castle	Yongbyon	철옹성북수구	鐵甕城北水口門
90	Sokun Pavilion	Yongbyon	석운정	石雲亭
91	Simjin Pavilion	Hyangam-ri, Hyangsan-gun	심진정	尋眞亭
92	Site of Sajol Pavilion	Taepyong-ri, Hyangsan-gun	사절정터	四節亭址
94	Kyejo Hermitage	Hyangam-ri, Hyangsan-gun	계조암	繼祖庵
95	Hwajang Hermitage	Hyangam-ri, Hyangsan-gun	화장암	華藏庵
96	Kumgang Hermitage	Hyangam-ri, Hyangsan-gun	금강암	金剛庵
97	Nungin Hermitage	Hyangam-ri, Hyangsan-gun	능인암	能仁庵
98	Habiro Hermitage	Hyangam-ri, Hyangsan-gun	하비로암	下毘盧庵
99	East Gate of Pyokdong Castle	Tongju-ri, Pyokdong-gun	벽동동문	碧潼東門
100	South Gate of Pyokdong Castle	Tongju-ri, Pyokdong-gun	벽동남문	碧潼南門

== No. 101-200 ==
	Name	Location	Chosŏn'gŭl	Hanja
101	Osa Pavilion	Tongju-ri, Pyokdong-gun	오사헌	五事軒
102	Mangmi Pavilion	Tongju-ri, Pyokdong-gun	망미정	望美亭
103	Hyonchung Shrine	Paekma Worker's District, Pihyon-gun	현충사	顯忠祠
104	Kaewonsa Buddhist temple	Tangsang-ri, Kwaksan-gun	개원사	開元寺
105	Powolsa Buddhist temple	Uhyon-ri, Kujang-gun	보월사	普月寺
106	Ryongmunsa Buddhist temple	Ryongdung Worker's District, Kujang-gun	룡문사	龍門寺
107	Mannyonsa Buddhist temple	Songan-dong, Kusong	만년사	萬年寺
108	Hwaong-ri Dolmen	Hwaong-ri, Unsan (North Pyongan)	화옹리고인돌	化翁里支石墓
114	Namsan-ri Menhir	Namsan-ri, Nyongbyon-gun	남산리선돌	南山里立石
117	Hakbong-ri Menhir	Hakbong-ri, Taechon-gun	학봉리선돌	鶴峯里立石
118	Sangdan-ri Menhir	Sangdan-ri, Taechon-gun	상단리선돌	上丹里立石
120	Sao-ri Menhir	Sao-ri, Kujang-gun	사오리선돌	沙烏里立石
121	Tongsang-ri Menhir	Tongsang-ri, Pihyon-gun	동상리선돌	東上里立石
122	Stupas of Ansimsa Buddhist temple	Hyangam-ri, Hyangsan-gun	안심사부도군	安心寺浮屠群
123	Nyongdokjin Fortress	Hadan-ri, Pihyon-gun	녕덕진성	寧德鎭城
124	Stone sculptures of Songdong-ri	Songdong-ri, Pihyon-gun	성동리석조각	城東里石彫刻
125	Dharani monument of Songdong-ri	Songdong-ri, Pihyon-gun	성동리다라니석당	城東里陀羅尼石幢
130	Five-story pagoda of Changgyongsa Buddhist temple	Tangsang-ri, Kwaksan-gun	장경사5층탑	長景寺五層塔
131	Five-story pagoda of Suguksa Buddhist temple	Sao-ri, Kujang-gun	수국사5층탑	守國寺五層塔
133	Kolmang Castle	Tanghu-ri, Pihyon-gun	걸망성	桀亡城
134	Ryonju Castle	Hadan-ri, Pihyon-gun	련주성	連州城
135	Chongnyong Castle	Hadan-ri, Pihyon-gun	정령성	丁寧城
136	Yonpyong Castle	Nojung-ri, Pihyon-gun	연평성	延平城
138	Tongju Castle	Kogunyong-ri, Tongrim-gun	통주성	通州城
139	Komsan Castle	Sansong-ri, Tongrim-gun	검산성	劍山城
140	Puhwang Castle	Puhwang-ri, Tongrim-gun	부황성	付皇城
141	Unam Fortress	Wonsepyong-ri, Cholsan-gun	운암산성	雲暗山城
142	Ryongsak Castle	Ryongsak-ri, Cholsan-gun	령삭성	令朔城
143	Kulam Castle	Sangdan-dong, Kusong	굴암산성	窟巖山城
144	Kiryong-ri Castle	Kiryong-ri, Kusong	기룡리성	氣龍里城
145	Chongrong-ri Old Castle	Chongryong-ri, Kusong	청룡리고성	青龍里古城
146	Paeksang-ri Barbican	Paeksang-ri, Kusong	백상리고성	白上里甕城
147	Sangdan-ri Barbican	Sangdan-dong, Kusong	상단리고성	上端里甕城
148	Imchon Castle	Chunsan-ri, Uiju-gun	임천성	臨泉城
150	Pongsu Castle	Chungdan-ri, Uiju-gun	봉수성	烽燧城
151	Maknyong Castle	Chungdan-ri, Uiju-gun	막녕성	幕寧城
152	Chungdan-ri Barbican	Chungdan-ri, Uiju-gun	중단리고성	中端里甕城
153	Uiju Castle	Uiju-up	의주읍성	義州邑城
154	Wiwonjin Fortress	Taesan-ri, Uiju-gun	위원진성	威遠鎭城
155	Haksong-ri Fortress	Songpyong-ri, Tongchang-gun	학성리성	鶴城里城
156	Tanga Fortress	Haksong-ri, Tongchang-gun	당아산성	堂峨山城
157	Chongsong Fortress	Chongsong Worker's District, Sakju-gun	청성산성	清城山城
158	Sambong Fortress	Samha-ri, Uiju-gun	삼봉산성	三峯山城
159	Chongsongjin Fortress	Chongsong Worker's District, Sakju-gun	청성진성	清城鎭城
160	Sangbang Changsong	Kumya-ri, Changsong-gun	상방장성	上方長城
161	Paekbyok Fortress	Ryonghung-ri, Unsan-gun	백벽산성	白壁山城
162	Koyonju Castle	Sangwon-ri, Unsan-gun	고연주성	古延州城
163	Kuksongryong Fortress	Kwandong-ri, Chonma-gun	극성령성	棘城嶺城
164	Sogo-ri Castle	Sogo-ri, Chonma-gun	서고리성	西古里城
165	Sinsi-ri Castle	Sinsi-ri, Chonma-gun	신시리성	新市里城
166	Namso-ri Castle	Taeu-ri, Chonma-gun	남서리성	南西里城
167	Siksongjin Fortress	Songrim-ri, Chonma-gun	식송진성	植松鎭城
168	Minbo Castle	Sangdan-ri, Taechon-gun	민보성	民保城
169	Tokwa-ri Castle	Tokhwa-ri, Taechon-gun	덕화리성	德化里城
170	Chongju Castle	Songnam-dong, Chongju	정주읍성	定州邑城
171	Ruins of the Paeyopsa Buddhist temple	Paeyop-ri, Anak-gun	패엽사터	貝葉寺址
172	Muju Castle	Kosong-ri, Nyongbyon-gun	무주성	撫州城
173	Pyokdong Castle	Tongju-ri, Pyokdong-gun	벽동읍성	碧潼邑城
174	Pakrung Castle	Pongsong-ri, Pakchon-gun	박릉성	博陵城
175	Wiju Castle	Sango-ri, Kujang-gun	위주성	渭州城
176	Taesakju Castle	Taegwan-up	대삭주성	大朔州城
178	Yongho Pavilion	Chosan-up	영호정	暎湖亭
180	Wonmyongsa Buddhist temple	Ryujung-ri, Huichon	원명사	圓明寺
181	Mansu Hermitage	Changpyong-ri, Huichon	만수암	萬壽庵
182	Koyon Pavilion	Namsan-dong, Kanggye	거연정	居然亭
185	Mangmi Pavilion	Segom-dong, Manpo	망미정	望美亭
188	Kanggye Castle	Kanggye	강계읍성	江界邑城
189	Many-storied pagoda of Popwangdae (Green Pagoda)	Changpyong-ri, Huichon	법왕대다층탑 (청탑)	法王臺多層塔 (青塔)
191	Wongok Castle	Kuryong-dong, Chosan-gun	원곡성	元谷城
192	Chosan Castle	Chosan-up	초산읍성	楚山邑城
193	Ryonpungjin Fortress	Ryonpung-ri, Chosan-gun	련풍진성	蓮豊鎭城
194	Sanyanghoe-po Castle	Ryonmu-ri, Chosan-gun	산양회성	山羊會堡城
195	Risanjin Fortress	Risan-ri, Chosan-gun	리산진성	理山鎭城
196	Toryu Castle	Changpyong-ri, Huichon	도류성	도류城
197	Yongpa Pavilion	Yokpyong-dong, Huichon	영파루	映波樓
198	Pangsong-ri Castle	Pangsong-ri, Kopung-gun	방성리성	坊城里城
199	Risan Castle	Pangsong-ri, Kopung-gun	리산성	理山城
200	Ryonggok-ri Barbican	Ryonggok-ri, Kopung-gun	룡곡리옹성	龍谷里甕城

== No. 201-300 ==
	Name	Location	Chosŏn'gŭl	Hanja
201	Pongdan Castle	Saeng-ri, Tongsin-gun	봉단성	鳳丹城
202	Uye Castle	Tosong-ri, Chunggang-gun	우예성	虞芮城
203	Ryoyon Castle	Chungdok-ri, Chunggang-gun	려연성	閭延城
204	Manpo Castle	Segom-dong, Manpo	만포읍성	滿浦邑城
205	Kildari Castle	Chonchon-up	길다리성	吉多里城
206	Kosong-ri City Wall	Kosong-ri, Wiwon-gun	고성리읍성	古城里邑城
207	Manhojin Fortress	Tokam-ri, Wiwon-gun	만호진성	萬戶鎭城
208	Kugol Castle	Kosong-ri, Wiwon-gun	구골성	구골城
209	Poptong Castle	Poptong-ri, Changsong-gun	법동성	法洞城
210	Songgan Fortress	Songgan-up	성간산성	城干山城
211	Ai Castle	Kumsong-ri, Usi-up	아이성	阿耳城
212	Taebong Pavilion	Yonggwang-ri, Haeju	태봉각	泰峯閣
213	Sami Pavilion	Sami-dong, Haeju	사미정	四美亭
214	Gatehouse of the Chaeryong Magistrate's Office	Chaeryong-up	재령아사문루	載寧衙舍門樓
215	Ryongdong-ri Dolmen	Ryongdong-ri, Paechon-gun	룡동리고인돌	龍東里支石墓
216	Changpo-ri Dolmen	Changpo-ri, Paechon-gun	창포리고인돌	昌浦里支石墓
217	Taea-ri Tomb	Taea-ri, Pongchon-gun	대아리고분	大雅里古墳
218	Tohyon-ri Dolmen Group	Tohyon-ri, Pyoksong-gun	도현리고인돌떼	道峴里支石墓群
222	Poku-ri Dolmen	Poku-ri, Sinchon-gun	복우리고인돌	福隅里支石墓
228	Chonggye-ri Dolmen Group	Chonggye-ri, Changyon-gun	청계리고인돌떼	清溪里支石墓群
230	Chuhwa-ri Dolmen	Chuhwa-ri, Changyon-gun	추화리고인돌	秋花里支石墓
231	Yongyang-ri Dolmen	Yongyang-ri, Haeju	영양리고인돌	迎楊里支石墓
232	Panryuk-ri Dolmen Group	Panryuk-ri, Anak-gun	판륙리고인돌떼	板六里支石墓群
235	Songbong-ri Menhir	Songbong-ri, Unchon-gun	송봉리선돌	松峰里立石
236	Five-story pagoda of Kangsosa Buddhist temple	Kangho-ri, Paechon-gun	강서사5층탑	江西寺五層塔
238	Five-story pagoda of Paeyopsa Buddhist temple	Paeyop-ri, Anak-gun	패엽사5층탑	貝葉寺五層塔
239	Five-story pagoda of Hongmun-ri	Unryul-up	홍문리5층탑	紅門里五層塔
240	Monument of Sujungsa Buddhist temple	Sujung-ri, Songhwa-gun	수증사비	修證寺碑
241	Suyang Fortress	Haeju	수양산성	首陽山城
243	Changsu Fortress	Ayang-ri, Sinwon-gun	장수산성	長壽山城
245	Kuwol Fortress	Anak-gun	구월산성	九月山城
247	Songmi Fortress	Ryongho-ri, Songhwa-gun	성미산성	城美山城
259	Masan Castle	Tungam-ri, Kangryong-gun	마산성	馬山城
260	Ryongyon Castle	Kohyon-ri, Ryongyon-gun	룡연읍성	龍淵邑城
261	Ryongyonjin Fortress	Ryongyon-up	룡연진성	龍淵鎭城
263	Pungchon Castle	Kwail-up	풍천읍성	豊川邑城
266	East gate of Taebaek Fortress	Sansong-ri, Pyongsan-gun	태백산성동문	太白山城東門
267	West gate of Taebaek Fortress	Sansong-ri, Pyongsan-gun	태백산성서문	太白山城西門
286	Hwangju Castle	Hwangju-up	황주읍성	黃州邑城
298	Pomun Hermitage	Solbong-ri, Kosan-gun	보문암	普門庵
299	Ryongchusa Buddhist Temple	Mihyon-ri, Anbyon-gun	령추사	靈鷲寺

== No. 301-400 ==
	Name	Location	Chosŏn'gŭl	Hanja
306	Stupa of the Venerable Sosan	Naegumgang-ri, Kumgang-gun	서산대사부도	西山大師浮屠
307	Mugyongdang Ryongun Stupa of Changansa Buddhist temple	Naegumgang-ri, Kumgang-gun	장안사무경당령운부도	長安寺無竟堂靈運浮屠
309	Sambulam Buddhist sculpture	Naekumgang-ri, Kumgang-gun	삼불암	三佛巖
311	Stupas of Sogwangsa Buddhist temple	Solbong-ri, Kosan-gun	석왕사부도떼	釋王寺浮屠群
316	Anbyon Town Wall	Anbyon	안변읍성	安邊邑城
320	Old Songjon Town Wall	Songjon-ri, T'ongchon-gun	송전구읍성	松田舊邑城
321	Old Tongchon Town Wall	Kuup-ri, Tongchon-gun	통천구읍성	通川舊邑城
331	Kosong Town Wall	Kuup-ri, Kosong-gun	고성읍성	高城邑城
346	Unrim Fortress	Sungjon-ri, Chonnae-gun	운림진성	雲林鎭城
355	Chewol Pavilion	Tonghungsan-dong, Hamhung	제월루	霽月樓
356	Kwangpung Pavilion	Hongwon	광풍루	光風樓
357	Haewol Pavilion	Haksong-ri, Hongwon	해월정	海月亭
360	Anbulsa Buddhist temple	Tonghung-ri, Kumya-gun	안불사	安佛寺
362	Pulji Hermitage	Ponghung-ri, Yonggwang-gun	불지암	佛地庵
365	Hungbok Hermitage	Sudong-ri, Hamhung	흥복암	興復庵
368	Hamhung Castle	Tonghungsan-dong, Hamhung	함흥성	咸興城
397	Chongpyong Town Wall	Chongpyong	정평읍성	定平邑城

== No. 401-500 ==
	Name	Location	Chosŏn'gŭl	Hanja
401	Seryu Castle	Kwanghung-ri, Chongpyong-gun	세류성	細柳城
403	Paekunsan Fortress	Ponghung-ri, Yonggwang-gun	백운산성	白雲山城
405	Hwangchoryong Fortress	Chungsang-ri, Yonggwang-gun	황초령성	黃草嶺城
406	Kapyong Castle	Chungsang-ri, Yonggwang-gun	가평성	加平城
407	Yowonsan Fortress	Samsong-ri, Hongwon-gun	요원산성	要原山城
408	Tongsan Earthen Castle	Sanyang-ri, Hongwon-gun	동산토성	東山土城
409	Taemunryong Changsong	Samsong-ri, Hongwon-gun	대문령장성	大門嶺長城
410	Chongyebong Fortress	Ryongdok-ri, Hongwon-gun	천계봉산성	天鷄峰山城
411	Songryong Fortress	Pusang-ri, Hongwon-gun	성령산성	城嶺山城
412	Hongwon Town Wall	Hongwon	홍원읍성	洪原邑城
419	Pukchong Town Wall	Pukchong	북청읍성	北青邑城
420	Todok Fortress	Yangpyong-ri, Tanchon	도덕산성	道德山城
422	Tanchon Town Wall	Tanchon	단천읍성	端川邑城
425	Rodong Fortress	Ryonghung-ri, Tanchon	로동산성	路洞山城
434	Kilju Provincial School	Kilju	길주향교	吉州鄕校
435	Kilju Magistrate's Office	Kilju	길주아사	吉州衙舍
436	Suhang Pavilion	Chongsong Worker's District, Onsong-gun	수항루	受降樓
437	Chongbuk Shrine	Sungam Worker's District, Kyongsong-gun	정북사	靖北祠
438	Kyongsong Provincial School	Sungam Worker's District, Kyongsong-gun	경성향교	鏡城鄕校
442	Tappyong-ri Pagoda	Opok-dong, Kimchaek	탑평리탑	塔坪里塔
443	Onpo Castle	Sangonpo-ri, Kyongsong-gun	온포성	溫堡城
450	Tajinsan Fortress	Ryongsong-ri, Kilju-gun	다진산성	多津山城
451	Kilju Town Wall	Kilju	길주읍성	吉州邑城
452	Yaksan Fortress	Sindong-ri, Kilju-gun	약산진성	藥山鎭城
453	Wonsan Fortress	Wonsan-ri, Hoeryong	약산진성	元山山城
455	Hoeryong Town Wall	Nammun-dong, Hoeryong	회령읍성	會寧邑城
456	Pungsan Fortress	Pungsan-ri, Hoeryong	풍산진성	豊山鎭城
457	Koryong Fortress	Ingye-ri, Hoeryong	고령진성	高嶺鎭城
467	Anwon Castle	Anwon-ri, Kyongwon-gun	안원성	安原城
476	Undusan Fortress	Songbuk-ri, Hoeryong	운두산성	雲頭山城
477	Poulha Fortress	Hongsan-ri, Hoeryong	보을하진성	甫乙下鎭城
486	Puryong Town Wall	Puryong	부령읍성	富寧邑城
494	Old Myongchon Town Wall	Haun-ri, Myongchon-gun	명천구읍성	明川舊邑城
499	Kwaegung Pavilion	Hyesan-dong, Hyesan	괘궁정	掛弓亭
500	Samsu East Gate	Samsu	삼수동문	三水東門

== No. 501-600 ==
	Name	Location	Chosŏn'gŭl	Hanja
501	Chunghungsa Buddhist temple	Kwanpyong-ri, Samsu-gun	중흥사	重興寺
506	Tujidong Barbican	Tuji-ri, Kimhyongjik-gun	두지동옹성	杜芝洞甕城
507	Kumchang Barbican	Kumchang-ri, Kimhyongjik-gun	금창옹성	金昌甕城
508	Chukjon Barbican	Chukjon-ri, Kimhyongjik-gun	갈전옹성	竹田甕城
509	Kaljon Barbican	Pujon-ri, Kimhyongjik-gun	갈전옹성	葛田甕城
510	Huju Town Wall	Koup Worker's District, Kimhyongjik-gun	후주읍성	厚州邑城
511	Ranan Barbican	Pungyang-ri, Kimjongsuk-gun	나난옹성	羅暖甕城
517	Changpyong Fortress	Kapsan	장평산성	長平山城
518	Kapsan Town Wall	Kapsan	갑산읍성	甲山邑城
520	Samsu Town Wall	Samsu	삼수읍성	三水邑城
522	Yusuyong Gatehouse	Pangjik-dong, Kaesong	류수영문루	留守營門樓
523	North Gate of Taehung Fortress	Pakyon-ri, Kaesong	대흥산성북문	大興山城北門
524	Pomsa Pavilion	Pakyon-ri, Kaesong	범사정	泛槎亭
525	Kugun Pavilion	Ryongsan-dong, Kaesong	구군정	九君亭
526	Tiger Pavilion	Sonjuk-dong, Kaesong	호정	虎亭
527	Kwandok Pavilion	Janam-dong, Kaesong	관덕정	觀德亭
528	Chilleunggun (Seven Tombs)	Haeson-ri, Kaepung-gun	칠릉군	七陵群
529	Taehungsa Buddhist temple	Pakyon-ri, Kaesong	대흥사	大興寺
531	Stupa of the Wontongsa Buddhist temple	Pangjik-dong, Kaesong	원통사부도	圓通寺浮屠
537	Maitreya statue of Sinsong-ri	Sinsong-ri, Kaepung-gun	신성리미륵	新聖里彌勒
538	Dragon heads of Suchang Palace	Koryo Museum, Kaesong	수창궁용머리	壽昌宮龍頭
540	Seven Story Pagoda of Kwanum Temple	Pakyon-ri, Kaesong	관음사7층탑	觀音寺西七層塔
541	East Three Story Pagoda of Ryongtong Temple	Ryonghung-ri, Kaesong	령통사동3층탑	靈通寺東三層塔
542	West Three Story Pagoda of Ryongtong Temple	Ryonghung-ri, Kaesong	령통사서3층탑	靈通寺西三層塔
545	Honrung Royal Tomb	Samgo-ri, Kaesong	헌릉	獻陵
546	Taerung Royal Tomb	Haeson-ri, Kaepung-gun	태릉	泰陵
547	Sonrunggun Royal Tombs	Haeson-ri, Kaepung-gun	선릉군	宣陵群
548	Sogurung Tomb	Yonrung-ri, Kaepung-gun	서구릉	西龜陵
549	Myongrung Royal Tomb	Yonrung-ri, Kaepung-gun	명릉	明陵
551	Hurung Royal Tomb	Ryongjong-ri, Kaepung-gun	후릉	厚陵
552	Anrung Royal Tomb	Konam-ri, Kaepung-gun	안릉	安陵
553	Yangrung Royal Tomb	Konam-ri, Kaepung-gun	양릉	陽陵
556	Cherung Royal Tomb	Taeryon-ri, Kaepung-gun	제릉	齊陵
557	Hwagok Tomb	Ryonghung-dong, Kaesong	화곡릉	花谷陵
558	Tonggurung Tomb	Ryonghung-dong, Kaesong	동구릉	東龜陵
559	Naengjongdong Tomb No. 1	Ryonghung-dong, Kaesong	냉정동제1릉	冷井洞第一陵
560	Naengjongdong Tomb No. 2	Ryonghung-dong, Kaesong	냉정동제2릉	冷井洞第二陵
561	Naengjongdong Tomb No. 3	Ryonghung-dong, Kaesong	냉정동제3릉	昭陵群第三陵
562	Sorunggun Royal Tomb No. 1	Ryonghung-dong, Kaesong	소릉군제1호	昭陵群第一號
563	Sorunggun Royal Tomb No. 2	Ryonghung-dong, Kaesong	소릉군제2호	昭陵群第二號
564	Sorunggun Royal Tomb No. 3	Ryonghung-dong, Kaesong	소릉군제3호	昭陵群第三號
565	Sorunggun Royal Tomb No. 4	Ryonghung-dong, Kaesong	소릉군제4호	昭陵群第四號
566	Sorunggun Royal Tomb No. 5	Ryonghung-dong, Kaesong	소릉군제5호	昭陵群第五號
567	Kangrung Royal Tomb	Jinbong-ri, Kaesong	강릉	康陵
568	Songrung Royal Tomb	Jinbong-ri, Kaesong	성릉	成陵
569	Yongrung Royal Tomb	Panmun-up, Kaesong	영릉	榮陵
570	Kyongrung Royal Tomb	Sonjok-ri, Changpung-gun	경릉	景陵
571	Wonrung Royal Tomb	Wolgo-ri, Changpung-gun	원릉	元陵
572	Konrung Royal Tomb	Wolgo-ri, Changpung-gun	건릉	乾陵
573	Chongrung Royal Tomb	Hwagok-ri, Kaepung-gun	정릉	貞陵
574	Yongan Castle	Nampo-ri, Kaepung-gun	영안성	永安城
575	Kwansan Castle	Nampo-ri, Kaepung-gun	관산성	官山城
575	Kwansan Castle	Yongang-ri, Kaepung-gun	관산성	官山城
576	Earthen castle of Sinsong-ri	Sinsong-ri, Kaepung-gun	신성리토성	新聖里土城
577	Earthen castle of Kuup-ri	Sinsong-ri, Kaepung-gun	구읍리토성	舊邑里土城
578	Sungchon Castle	Haepyong-ri, Kaepung-gun	승천성	昇天城
579	Ryohyonjin Fortress	Ryohyon-ri, Kaepung-gun	려현진성	礪峴鎭城
580	Paenamsan Earthen Castle	Chogang-ri, Kaepung-gun	배남산토성	背南山土城
581	Paekchisan Fortress	Changjwa-ri, Changpung-gun	백치산성	白峙山城
583	Kobangsan Fortress	Chongho-dong, Taesong-guyok, Pyongyang	고방산성	高坊山城
585	Wangsan Castle	Hwachon-ri, Sungho-guyok, Pyongyang	왕산성	王山城
586	Kanchon-ri Castle	Kanchon-ri, Kangnam-gun	간천리성	間川里城
587	Majangsan Fortress	Majang-ri, Chunghwa-gun	마장산성	馬場山城
588	Tongjin Castle	Majang-ri, Chunghwa-gun	동진성	東鎭城
589	Toksan Castle	Sagi-ri, Sangwon-gun	덕산성	德山城
595	Nakrang Tomb No. 1 (Bujoyegun Tomb)	Nakrang-dong, Nakrang-guyok, Pyongyang	낙랑1호분 (부조예군분)	樂浪二號墳 (夫租濊君墳)
596	Nakrang Tomb No. 2 (Jugo Tomb)	Jongbaek-dong, Nakrang-guyok, Pyongyang	낙랑2호분 (주고분)	樂浪二號墳 (周古墳)
597	Nakrang Tomb No. 11	Nakrang-dong, Nakrang-guyok, Pyongyang	낙랑11호분	樂浪十一號墳
598	Nakrang Tomb No. 13	Nakrang-dong, Nakrang-guyok, Pyongyang	낙랑13호분	樂浪十三號墳
598	Nakrang Tomb No. 13	Nakrang-dong, Nakrang-guyok, Pyongyang	낙랑13호분	樂浪十三號墳

== No. 701-800 ==
	Name	Location	Chosŏn'gŭl	Hanja
740	Monument of Chungmin Shrine	Anju	충민사비	忠愍祠碑

== 801-900 ==
	Name	Location	Chosŏn'gŭl	Hanja
821	Songwon Chapyongjin Fortress	Songwon County	송원차평진성	松源車坪鎭城

== No. 901-1000 ==
	Name	Location	Chosŏn'gŭl	Hanja
986	Stupas of the Hakrimsa Buddhist temple	Hakrim-ri, Changyon-gun	학림사부도떼	鶴林寺浮屠群

== No. 1101–1200 ==
	Name	Location	Chosŏn'gŭl	Hanja
1129	Haewoltang Stupa of the Simwonsa Buddhist temple	Yontan-gun	심원사해월당부도	心源寺海月堂浮屠

== No. 1301–1400 ==
	Name	Location	Chosŏn'gŭl	Hanja
1359	Gravestone of Yi Chi-ran	Sinsang-ri, Pukchong-gun	병인양요전승비	李芝蘭信徒碑
1359	Pyongin Incident Victory Monument	Puchang-ri, Sinpo	병인양요전승비	丙寅洋擾戰勝碑
1360	Monument of Changui Shrine	Gungsong-dong, Hungnam-guyok, Hamhung	창의사비	彰義祠碑
1367	Stupa of Yi Chi-ran	Sinsang-ri, Pukchong-gun	이지란부도	李芝蘭浮圖
1370	Sarira Pagoda of the Chonggwangsa Buddhist Temple	Wonsa-ri, Riwon-gun	정광사사리탑	定光寺舍利塔

== No. 1501–1600 ==
	Name	Location	Chosŏn'gŭl	Hanja
1539	Memorial to U Hyon-bo	Pangjik-dong, Kaesong	우현보유허비	禹玄寶遺墟碑
1540	Memorial to Ryu Kuk-ryang	Pangjik-dong, Kaesong	류극량유허비	劉克良遺墟碑
1541	Memorial to Yi Che-hyon	Sonjuk-dong, Kaesong	이제현유허비	李齊賢遺墟碑
1542	Memorial to Song Sang-hyon	Pangjik-dong, Kaesong	송상현유허비	宋象賢遺墟碑
1543	Monument to Hong Kwan	Songak-dong, Kaesong	홍관비	洪灌碑
1544	Memorial to Kim Do	Tonghung-dong, Kaesong	김도유허비	金濤遺墟碑
1545	Site of Kyongdok Palace	Namsan-dong, Kaesong	경덕궁터	敬德宮址
1546	Dumundong Monument	Yonrung-ri, Kaepung-gun	두문동비	杜門洞碑
1546	Stone Buddha of the Miruksa Buddhist temple	Pangjik-dong, Kaesong	미륵사석불입상	彌勒寺石佛立像
1585	Monument to the Venerable Pyokho	Hyangam-ri, Hyangsan-gun	벽허대사비	碧虛大師碑

== No. 1601–1700 ==
	Name	Location	Chosŏn'gŭl	Hanja
1686	Blank Stele of Singwangsa Buddhist temple	Singwang-ri, Haeju	신광사무자비	神光寺無字碑
1688	Stupas of the Singwangsa Buddhist temple	Singwang-ri, Haeju	신광사부도	神光寺浮屠

== No. 1701–1800 ==
	Name	Location	Chosŏn'gŭl	Hanja
1743	Tomb of Kim Ung-so	Okdo-ri, Ryonggang-gun, Nampo	김응서묘	金應瑞墓

== See also ==
- National Treasures of North Korea
- National treasures of South Korea
- Complex of Koguryo Tombs
- History of Korea
- Culture of Korea
- World Heritage sites in North Korea
