= Sinjŭng Tongguk yŏji sŭngnam =

1530 Korean geography book

- Hangul: 신증동국여지승람
- Hanja: 新增東國輿地勝覽
- RR: Sinjeung Dongguk yeoji seungnam
- MR: Sinjŭng Tongguk yŏji sŭngnam

Sinjŭng Tongguk yŏji sŭngnam (Korean: 신증동국여지승람; Hanja: 新增東國輿地勝覽), or Revised Augmented Survey of the Geography of Korea, is a Korean geography book that was published by the Joseon dynasty in 1530. It is a revision and enlargement of the Tongguk yŏji sŭngnam, or Augmented Survey of the Geography of Korea, which was published in 1481 and contains 50 volumes. The only printed copy of the book can be found at Kyoto University. However, printed volumes 37 and 38 of the Tongguk yŏji sŭngnam are in private ownership in South Korea. The original wooden print is in Kyujanggak.

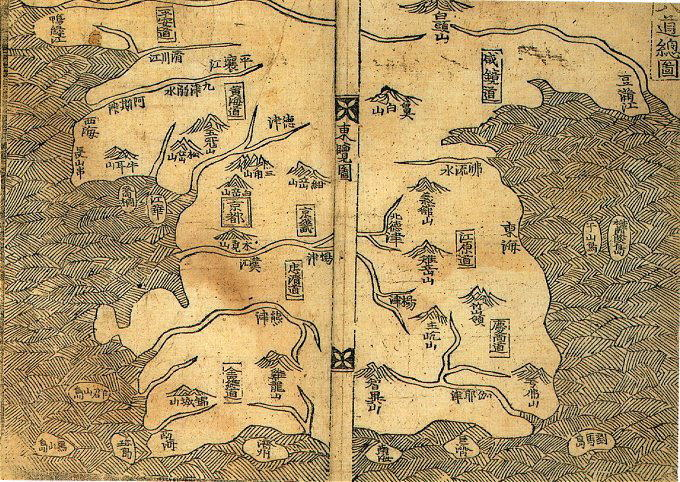
The section of the book showing the whole provinces of Korea called paldochongdo.

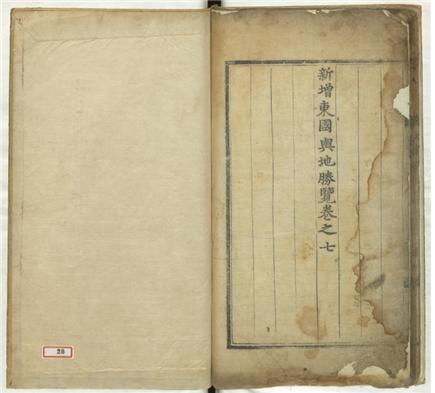
Page from Sinjŭng Tongguk yŏji sŭngnam held in Cheongju Early Printing Museum

== History ==
The project was originally created in 1481 and imitated a Chinese pattern for geographies. In 1530, five more books were added, making the series an expanded edition. Thus the word sinjŭng (新增) was added to indicate the expansion of content, with the total of 55 books. The enlarged edition was compiled by Lee Haeng and Yun Eun-bo.

The book was more of a guidebook for a separate map rather than actual cartography. Each book started with the drawing of the overall view of the regions covered, and wrote about the history, customs, temples, mausoleums, palaces and administrative quarters and educational institutions thereafter. The book contained prologues written by Confucian scholars of the times.

== Content ==
The regions that were covered are the same as below.

Book number	Provinces covered	Specific regions covered or trivia
01	The capital (京都)	Its part one of the book covering the city. Only covered the inner cities of the capital.
02	The capital (京都)	Its part two of the book covering the city.
03	Hanseong	Hanseong was the term for the capital and its suburbs, especially in the context of within the city walls.
04	Kaesong	
05	Kaesong	
06	Gyeonggi Province	Gwangju County
07	Gyeonggi Province	yeoju
08	Gyeonggi Province	Icheon, Yanggeun, Jipyeong, Eumjuk, Yangji, Juksan, Gwacheon County
09	Gyeonggi Province	Suwon, Bupyeong, Namyang, Incheon, Ansan
10	Gyeonggi Province	Anseong, Jinwi, Yangcheon, Yongin, Gimpo, Geumcheon, Yangseong, Tongjin
11	Gyeonggi Province	Yangju, Paju, Goyang, Yongpyong County, Pocheon, Jeoksong County, Gyoha County, Gapyeong County
12	Gyeonggi Province	Jangdan County, Ganghwa County
13	Gyeonggi Province	Pungdok County, Saknyeong County, Majeon County, Yeoncheon County, Gyodong County
14	Chungcheong Province	Chungju, Danyang County, Goesan County, Chongpung County, Yonpung County, Eumseong County, Yongchun County, Jecheon
15	Chungcheong Province	Cheongju, Okcheon County, Cheonan, Munui County
16	Chungcheong Province	Jiksan County, Mokchon County, Hoein County, Chongan County, Jincheon County, Boeun County, Yeongdong County, hwanggan County, Chongsan County
17	Chungcheong Province	Gongju, Yimchon County, Hansan County
18	Chungcheong Province	Jeonui County, Jeongsan County, Unjin County, Hoedok County, Jinjam County, Yonsan County, Yisan County, Buyeo County, Seokseong County, Yeongi County
19	Chungcheong Province	Hongjumok, Seocheon County
20	Chungcheong Province	Daeheung, Biyin
21	Gyeongsang Province	Gyeongju
22	Gyeongsang Province	Ulju County
23	Gyeongsang Province	Donglae, Chongha, yeongil, Jangki, Kijang, Eonyang
24	Gyeongsang Province	Andong, Chongsong, Yeonghae, Yecheon
25	Gyeongsang Province	yeongcheon, Punggi, uiseong, yeongdeok, Bonghwa, Jinbo, Gunwi, Bian, Ye An, Yonggung County
26	Gyeongsang Province	Daegu, Milyang, Cheongdo
27	Gyeongsang Province	Gyeongsan, Hayang, Indong County, Hyeonpung, Uiheung, Shinnyeong, Yeongsan, Changnyeong
28	Gyeongsang Province	Sangju, Seongju
29	Gyeongsang Province	Seonsan, Geumsan, Gaeryeong, Jirye, Goryeong, Mungyeong, Hamchang
30	Gyeongsang Province	Jinju, Hapcheon, Chogye
31	Gyeongsang Province	Hamyang, Gonyang county, Namhae, Geochang, Sacheon, Samga, uiryeong, Hadong, Saneum, Aneum, Danseong
32	Gyeongsang Province	Gimhae, Changwon, Haman, Geoje, Goseong, Chilwon, Jinhae, Woongcheon
33	Jeolla Province	Jeonju, Iksan, Gimje, Gobu, Geumsan, Jinsan
34	Jeolla Province	Yeosan, Mangyeong, Yimpi, Geumgu, Jeongeup, Heungdeok, Buan, Okgu, Yongan, Hamyeol, Gosan, Taein
35	Jeolla Province	Naju, Gwangsan, Yeongam
36	Jeolla Province	Yeonggwang, Hampyeong, Gochang, Jangsung, Jinwon, Mujang, Nampyeong, Muan
37	Jeolla Province	Jangheung, Jindo, Kangjin, Haenam
38	Jeolla Province	Jeju
39	Jeolla Province	Namwon, Damyang, Sunchang, Yongdam, Cheongpyeong, Imsil, Muju, Gokseong, Jinan County, Okgwa, Unbong, Jangsu
40	Jeolla Province	Suncheon, Nak-an, Boseong, Neungseong, Gwangyang, Gurye, Heungyang, Dongbok, Hwasun
41	Hwanghae Province	Hwangju, Pyongsan County, Sŏhŭng County, Pongsan County
42	Hwanghae Province	Anak County, Jaeryeong, Suan County, Goksan, Sinchon County, Singye County, Ubong County, Munhwa County, Jangryeon County, Tosan County
43	Hwanghae Province	Haeju, Yonan County, Pungchon County, Paechon County, Ongjin County, Songhwa County, Unnyul County, Kangum county, Kangryong County, Changyon County
44	Kangwon Province	Gangneung, Samcheok, Yangyang
45	Kangwon Province	
46	Kangwon Province	
47	Kangwon Province	
48	Hamgyong Province	Hamhung, Yonghung County, Chongpyong County, Kowon County
49	Hamgyong Province	Anbyon County, Dokwon County, Munchon, Pukchong County, Tanchon, Yisong County, Hongwon County, Kapsan County, Samsu County
50	Hamgyong Province	Kyongsong County, Kilsong County, Myongchon County, Kyongwon County, Hoeryong, Jongsung County, Onsong County, Kyonghung County, Puryong County
51	Pyongan Province	Pyongyang
52	Pyongan Province	Chunghwa County, Ryonggang County, Samhwa County, Hamjong County, Chungsan County, Kangso County, Anju, Chongju, Sukchon County, Gasan County, Sunan County, Yeongyu County
53	Pyongan Province	Uiju County, Cholsan County, Ryongchon County, Changsong County, Sakju County, Kusong, Sonchon County, Kwaksan County
54	Pyongan Province	Yongbyon, Huichon, Unsan, Pakchon County, Taechon, Songchon County, Tokchon, Kaechon, Jasan
55	Pyongan Province	Sunchon, Sangwon, Samdung, Yangdok, Maengsan, Kangdong, Kanggye, Unsan County, Wiwon County, Yisan County, Pyoktong County, Nyongwon County
