= Gyeonggi (region) =

Central region of the Korean Peninsula

- Region of Korea
- Etymology: "Area Surrounding the Capital"
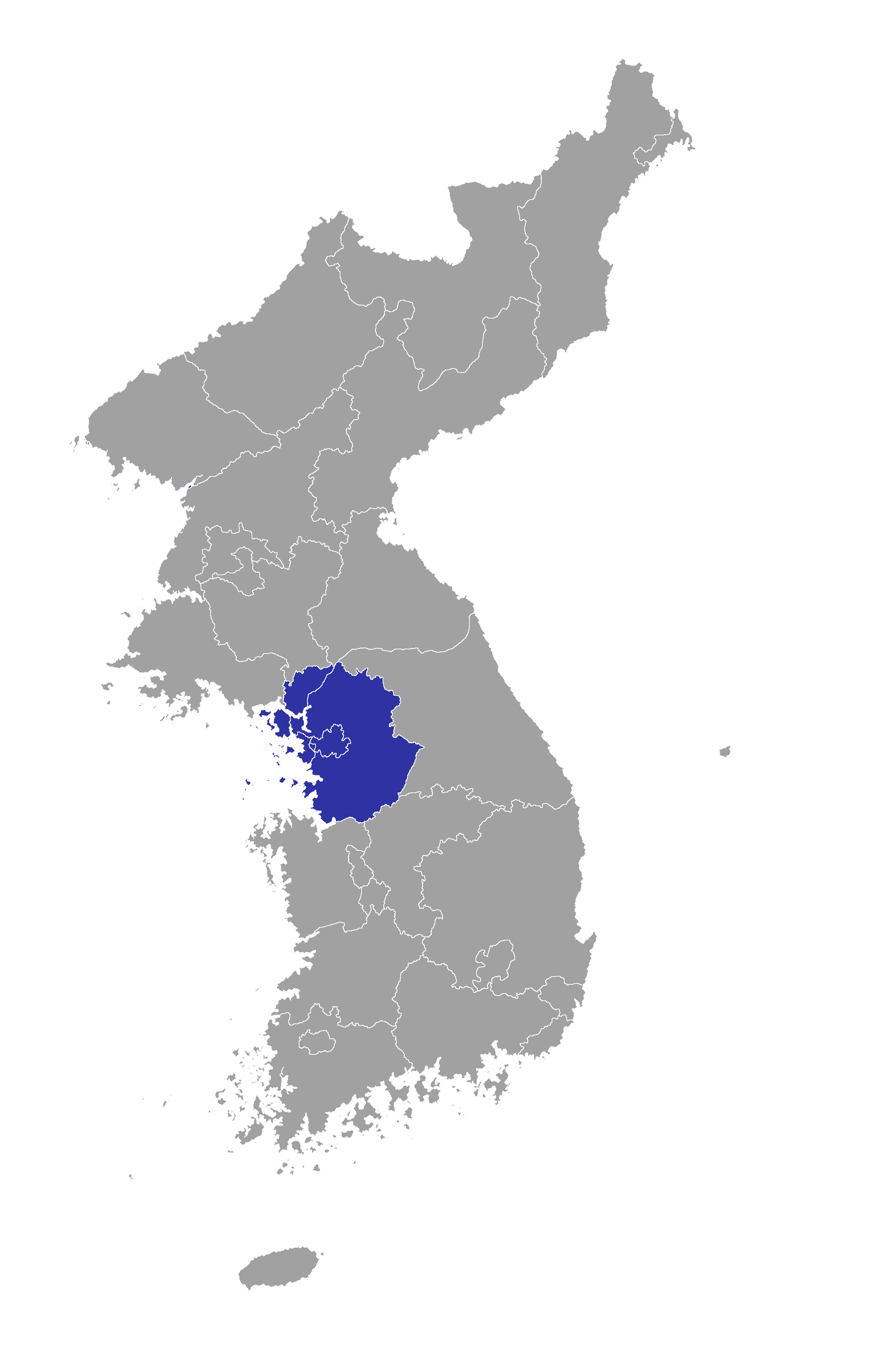
- Gyeonggi marked in blue in central Korea
- Countries: North Korea; South Korea
- Dialects: Gyeonggi (문화어, 표준어)

Korean name
- Hangul: 경기 지방
- Hanja: 京畿地方
- RR: Gyeonggi jibang
- MR: Kyŏnggi chibang

Gyeonggi (Korean: 경기; Hanja: 京畿), alternatively spelled Kyŏnggi or Kyunggi, is a region of the Korean Peninsula that has historically occupied the west-central region of Korea. In modern times, the region hosts South Korea's Gyeonggi Province and Incheon Metropolitan City, and North Korea's Kaesong Industrial Region, and Changpung, and Ch'ŏrwŏn counties.

== Etymology ==
The current name of the region, Gyeonggi, comes from a combination of Gyeong (京/경; "capital") and Gi (畿/기; "near"), ultimately from Gyeonghyeon (京縣/경현) and Gihyeon (畿縣/기현) in relation to the location of the capital, Gaegyeong (modern day Kaesŏng, North Korea). The name means "Area Surrounding the Capital", and was first used in 1018 during the Goryeo dynasty. Prior, the region was called Gwannae-do (關內道/관내도).

== History ==
=== Unified Silla and Goryeo ===
Towards the end of the Three Kingdoms period, the southeastern kingdom of Silla unified the Korean Peninsula up to the Taedong River and moved the capital from Gyeongju to Kaesong shortly thereafter. Gyeonggi originally a frontier region to Kaesong, as well as the secondary capital Namgyeong (modern-day Seoul, South Korea).

=== Joseon and Korean Empire periods ===
In 1392, general Yi Seong-gye, later 'Taejo of Joseon', waged successful a coup against the Goryeo dynasty and founded the Joseon dynasty. Two years later, Taejo moved the capital south to Hanseong (modern-day Seoul). During the Joseon dynasty, Hanseong served not only as the national capital, but the provincial capital as well. Gyeonggi was one of the Eight Provinces (팔도 paldo), until 1895 when King Gojong created the 23 District system, splitting Gyeonggi into five districts, or bu (府/부):

- Hanseong-bu (韓城府/한성부)
- Incheon-bu (仁川府/인천부)
- Gaeseong-bu (改城府/개성부)
- Gongju-bu (公洲府/공주부)
- Chungju-bu (忠州府/충주부)

One year later, the 23 districts were reorganized into eighteen provinces. In 1910, the Korean Empire was annexed into the Empire of Japan. Japanese Korea, or Chōsen (Kanji: 朝鮮), was administered from Keijō (JP: 京城; Korean: 경성), and was surrounded by Keiki-dō.

=== Contemporary history (1945–present) ===
Korea was liberated from Japan in 1945, and the People's Republic of Korea, a provisional government, was founded shortly after. The provisional republic remained a sovereign, independent state for several days, until the United States and Soviet Union devised a plan to temporary partition Korea into two occupied zones, then reunify the peninsula once it was determined that the Koreans were fit to govern themselves.

Korea was divided at the 38th parallel north, which divided Korea roughly in half. Korea south of the 38th parallel was occupied by the United States Army Military Government in Korea. Most of Gyeonggi, including Kaesong, fell under the American occupation zone. By the end of the war, Kaesong was one of the only cities to officially change hands, going from a South Korean city to a North Korean city.

== Administrative divisions ==
Both Korean governments claim sovereignty over the whole of the Korean Peninsula, and neither governments recognize changes to Korea's internal divisions made by the other.

=== Administrative divisions of Kyŏnggi (North Korea) ===
Kyŏnggi falls under one of the seven claimed provinces of North Korea.

Provinces (道/도)
Map	Province	Hancha	Chosŏn'gŭl	RR	McCune-Reischauer	Abbreviation	Capital
	Kyonggi	京畿道	경기도	Gyeonggi-do	Kyŏnggi-do	N/A	Sŏul

Cities of Kyŏnggi-do

- Sŏul (서울市/서울시; capital)
- Inch'ŏn (仁川市/인천시)
- Sŏngnam (城南市/성남시)
- Koyang (高陽市/고양시)
- Ryongin (龍仁市/룡인시)
- Puch'ŏn (富川市/부천시)
- Ansan (安山市/안산시)
- Yangju (楊州市/양주시)
- Hwasŏng (華城市/화성시)
- Ŭijŏngbu (議政府市/의정부)
- Sihŭng (始興市/시흥시)
- P'yŏngtaek (平澤市/평택시)
- Kwangmyŏng (光明市/광명시)
- Paju (坡州市/파주시)
- Kunp'o (軍浦市/군포시)
- Kwangju (廣州市/광주시)
- Kimp'o (金浦市/김포시)
- Ich'ŏn (利川市/이천시)
- Kuri (九里市/구리시)
- Osan (烏山市/오산시)
- Ansŏng (安城市/안성시)
- Ŭiwang (義王市/의왕시)
- Poch'ŏn (抱川市/보천시)
- Hanam (河南市/하남시)
- Tongduch'ŏn (東豆川市/동두천)
- Kwach'ŏn (果川市/과천시)
- Ryŏju (驪洲市/려주시)

Counties of Kyŏnggi-do

- Yangpyŏng (楊平郡/양평군)
- Kapyŏng (加平郡/가평군)
- Ryŏnch'ŏn (漣川郡/련천군)

Areas of South Hwanghae and Kangwŏn in the Kyŏnggi region

- Kaesŏng City (改城市/개성시)
- Kaep'ung Ward (開豊區域/개풍구역)
- Changp'ung County (長豊郡/장풍군)
- Ch'ŏrwŏn County (鐵原郡/철원군)

=== Administrative divisions of Gyeonggi (South Korea) ===
Provinces (道/도)
Map	Province	Hanja	Hangul	RR	McCune-Reischauer	Abbreviation	Capital
	Gyeonggi	京畿道	경기도	Gyeonggi-do	Kyŏnggi-do	N/A	Suwon

#	Name	Hangul	Hanja	Population (2015.5)	Subdivisions
— Special City —
1	Suwon	수원시	水原市	1,177,376	4 ilban-gu — 41 haengjeong-dong
2	Seongnam	성남시	城南市	974,580	3 ilban-gu — 39 haengjeong-dong
3	Goyang	고양시	高陽市	1,041,706	3 ilban-gu — 46 haengjeong-dong
4	Yongin	용인시	龍仁市	968,346	3 ilban-gu — 1 eup, 6 myeon, 23 haengjeong-dong
5	Bucheon	부천시	富川市	852,758	36 haengjeong-dong
6	Ansan	안산시	安山市	704,765	2 ilban-gu — 24 haengjeong-dong
7	Anyang	안양시	安養市	599,464	2 ilban-gu — 31 haengjeong-dong
8	Namyangju	남양주시	南楊州市	640,579	5 eup, 4 myeon, 7 haengjeong-dong
9	Hwaseong	화성시	華城市	565,269	4 eup, 10 myeon, 10 haengjeong-dong
— City —
10	Uijeongbu	의정부시	議政府市	431,149	15 haengjeong-dong
11	Siheung	시흥시	始興市	393,356	17 haengjeong-dong
12	Pyeongtaek	평택시	平澤市	453,437	3 eup, 6 myeon, 13 haengjeong-dong
13	Gwangmyeong	광명시	光明市	346,888	18 haengjeong-dong
14	Paju	파주시	坡州市	416,439	4 eup, 9 myeon, 7 haengjeong-dong
15	Gunpo	군포시	軍浦市	288,494	11 haengjeong-dong
16	Gwangju	광주시	廣州市	304,503	3 eup, 4 myeon, 3 haengjeong-dong
17	Gimpo	김포시	金浦市	344,585	3 eup, 3 myeon, 6 haengjeong-dong
18	Icheon	이천시	利川市	204,988	2 eup, 8 myeon, 4 haengjeong-dong
19	Yangju	양주시	楊州市	203,519	1 eup, 4 myeon, 6 haengjeong-dong
20	Guri	구리시	九里市	186,611	8 haengjeong-dong
21	Osan	오산시	烏山市	207,596	6 haengjeong-dong
22	Anseong	안성시	安城市	181,478	1 eup, 11 myeon, 3 haengjeong-dong
23	Uiwang	의왕시	義王市	157,916	6 haengjeong-dong
24	Pocheon	포천시	抱川市	155,629	1 eup, 11 myeon, 2 haengjeong-dong
25	Hanam	하남시	河南市	155,752	12 haengjeong-dong
26	Dongducheon	동두천시	東豆川市	97,407	8 haengjeong-dong
27	Gwacheon	과천시	果川市	69,914	6 haengjeong-dong
28	Yeoju	여주시	驪州市	110,560	1 eup, 8 myeon, 3 haengjeong-dong
— County —
29	Yangpyeong	양평군	楊平郡	106,445	1 eup, 11 myeon
30	Gapyeong	가평군	加平郡	61,403	1 eup, 5 myeon
31	Yeoncheon	연천군	漣川郡	45,314	2 eup, 8 myeon
— Claimed —
32	Gaeseong Special City	개성특별시	開城特別市	192,578	24 dong, 3 ri
33	Gaepung-guyeok	개풍구역	開豊區域	Unknown	2 dong, 14 ri
33	Jangdan County	장단군	長湍郡	Unknown	Unknown
