= Tosan =

The Tosan tank is an Iranian light tank based on the FV101 Scorpion.

Tosan may also refer to:

- Tosan (missile), an Iranian clone of the 9M113 Konkurs
- Tosan County, North Hwanghae Province, North Korea
- Tosan Gung clan, a Korean clan from North Hwanghae
- Tosan Evbuomwan, British college basketball player
- Tosan Popo, English semi professional footballer
