= Kim Hyung-mok =

South Korean entrepreneur (1912–2003)

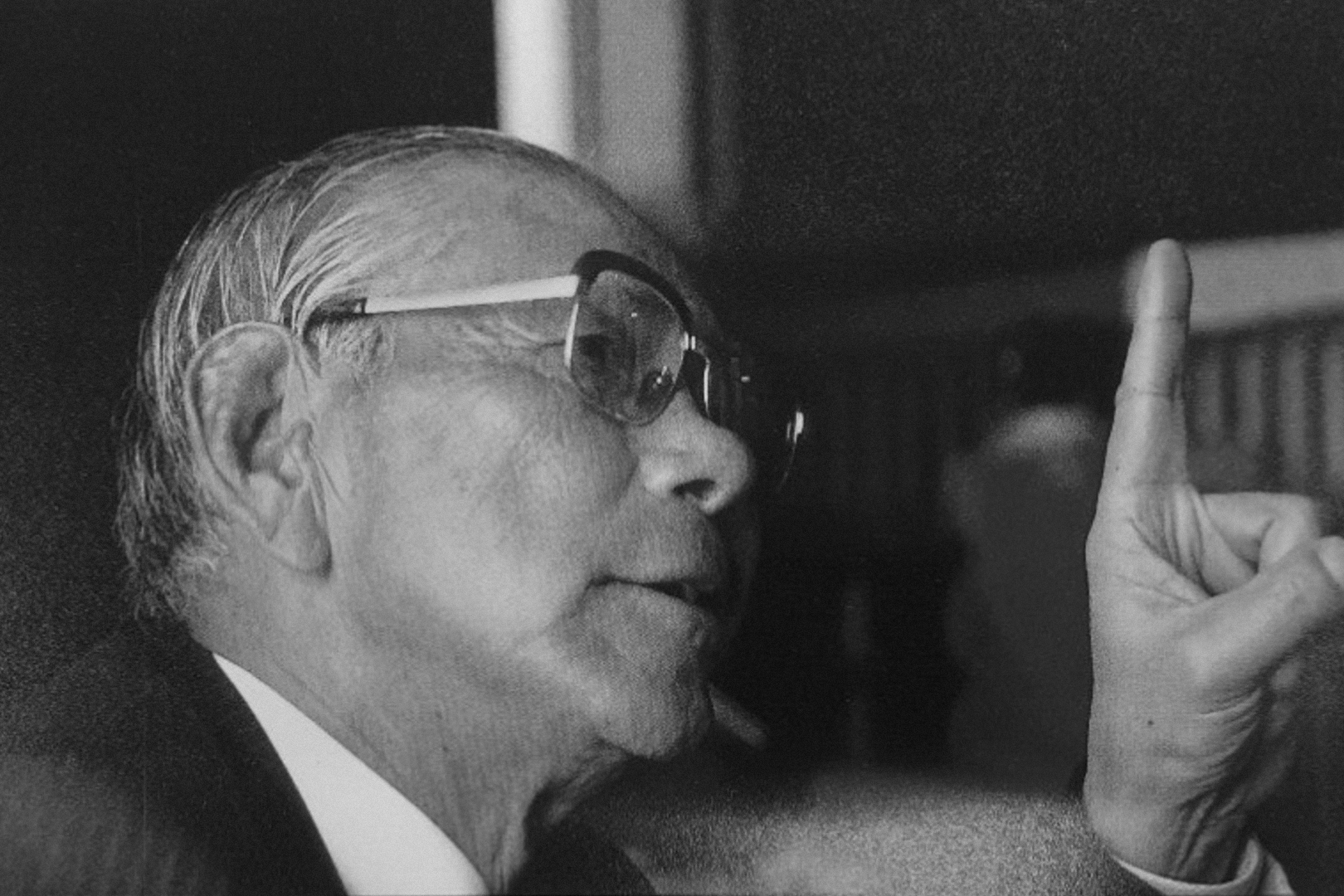
- Kim Hyung-mok, Commemorative Speech for the Publication of Reality and Ideal
- Born: 1912; Pukchong, Kankyōnan Province, Korea, Empire of Japan
- Died: July 21, 2003 (aged 90–91)
- Occupations: Businessman, real estate developer, educator

Korean name
- Hangul: 김형목
- Hanja: 金炯穆
- RR: Gim Hyeongmok
- MR: Kim Hyŏngmok

Kim Hyung-mok (Korean: 김형목; 1912 – July 21, 2003) was a South Korean entrepreneur and educational advocate. He was the founder of the Haechung Educational Foundation and was involved in the urban development of southern Seoul, particularly the Gangnam area. He established Youngdong High School in 1973.

== Early life and business career ==
Kim was born in 1912 in Pukchong, South Hamgyong Province during the Japanese occupation of Korea. After graduating from Pukchong Public Agricultural School in 1928, he founded Dongyang Cotton Store, a textile retail business, with his father's support. By the mid-1940s, it was a notable textile store in the Gwanbuk region. After Korea was liberated from Japanese colonial rule in 1945, Kim relocated to South Korea and operated a clothing wholesale business at Namdaemun Market in Seoul.

In the early 1960s, Kim began acquiring farmland in what later became the Gangnam district of Seoul, then largely agricultural land.

== Gangnam development ==
During the 1970s, the South Korean government under President Park Chung Hee initiated major urban development projects in southern Seoul. Kim was a key member of the Janghanpyeong Farmland Improvement Association, a consortium of landowners and entrepreneurs, many of whom had origins in North Korea. The group collectively acquired land across Gangnam, including present-day Samseong-dong, Apgujeong-dong, and Daechi-dong.

Kim co-founded Gangnam Development Co., Ltd. with Jeon Jae-jun and helped develop residential buildings such as Cheongshil Apartment and Sinhaecheong Apartment. In 1983, he opened Yeongdong Department Store, one of the first department stores in Gangnam, later redeveloped into the Shinsegae Department Store Gangnam Branch.

Some South Korean media have referred to Kim as an early contributor to the district's commercial growth.

== Educational initiatives ==
On April 18, 1972, Kim established the Haechung Educational Foundation and became its first chairman. The foundation received government approval to open Youngdong High School in December 1972; the school officially opened in March 1973 with an emphasis on sincerity, diligence, and civic responsibility.

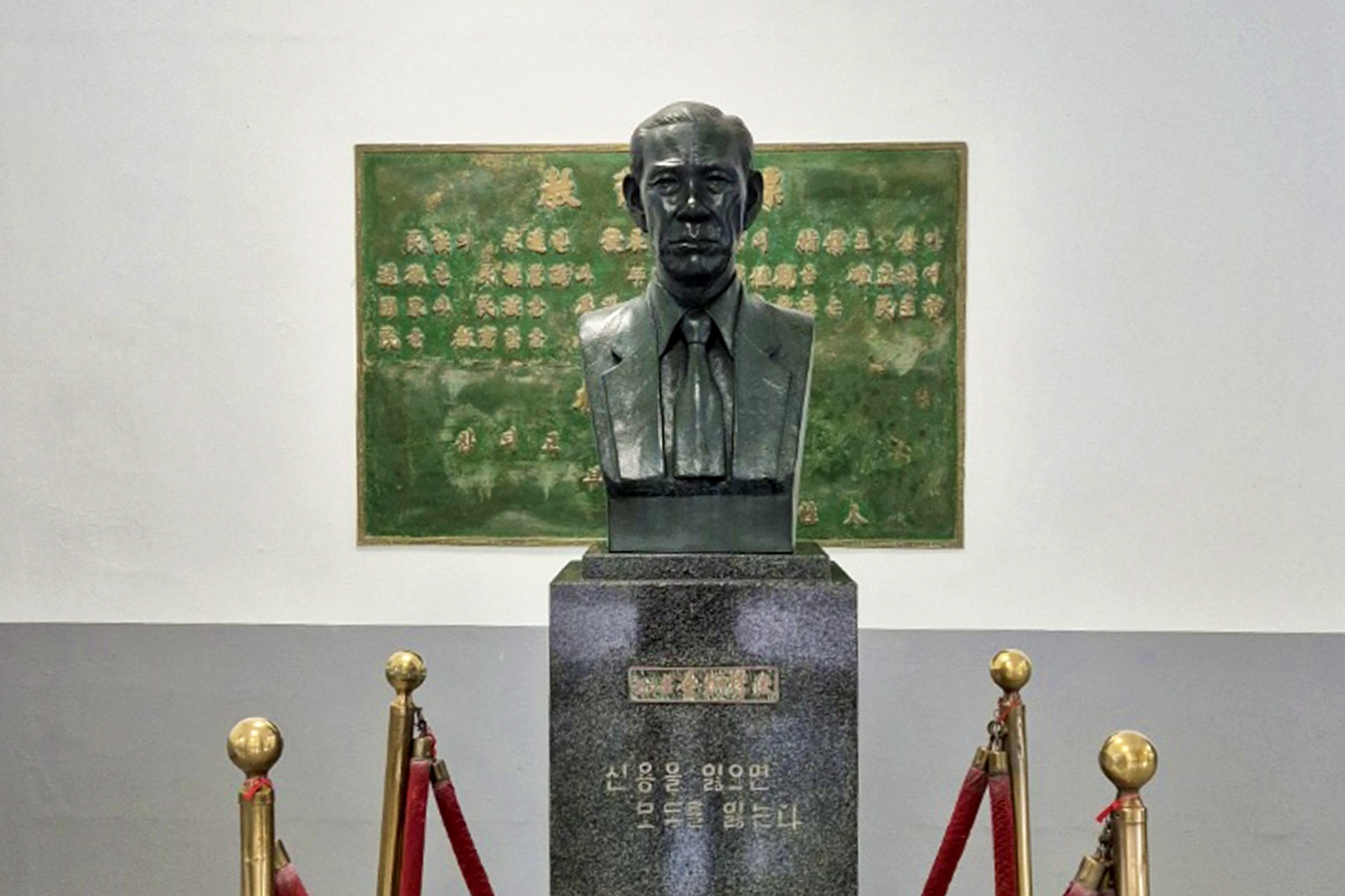
Bust of Kim Hyung-mok on the campus of Youngdong High School

Kim also donated land in Cheongdam-dong for the Bukcheong County Association Hall, a community space and student residence for people from his hometown.

== Other roles ==
Kim served as CEO of Samdeok Paper and president of Seoul Shipping. He was active in public and commemorative institutions, including the National Unification Advisory Council and the Yi Jun Memorial Foundation. In 1986, he delivered a eulogy during the 79th anniversary ceremony for Yi Jun, emphasizing national unity and historical remembrance.

== Personal life and legacy ==
Kim was married to Lee Jeong-rye and had three sons and four daughters. He remained active in real estate investment through the 1990s.

He died on July 21, 2003 at the age of 91.
