= Pungcheon No clan =

Korean clan from South Hwanghae Province

- Country: Korea
- Current region: Kwail County
- Founder: No Ji
- Connected members: No Kum-sok; Roh Yoon-seo; Roh Jeong-eui

Pungcheon No clan (Korean: 풍천 노씨; Hanja: 豊川 盧氏) is one of the Korean clans. Their Bon-gwan was in Kwail County, South Hwanghae Province. According to the research in 2015, the number of Pungcheon No clan was 45,200. Their founder was No Ji. No Ji was 3rd son of No Hae) who was dispatched to Silla when No Ji was a Hanlin Academy in Tang dynasty. No Ji was appointed as Prince of Pungcheon (Hanja: 豊川伯) during Goryeo period. No Yu (Hanja: 盧裕), a descendant of No Ji, began Pungcheon No clan because he was appointed as a Jinshi (Hanja: 進士).

== See also ==
- Korean clan names of foreign origin
