= Royal Tombs of the Goryeo Dynasty =

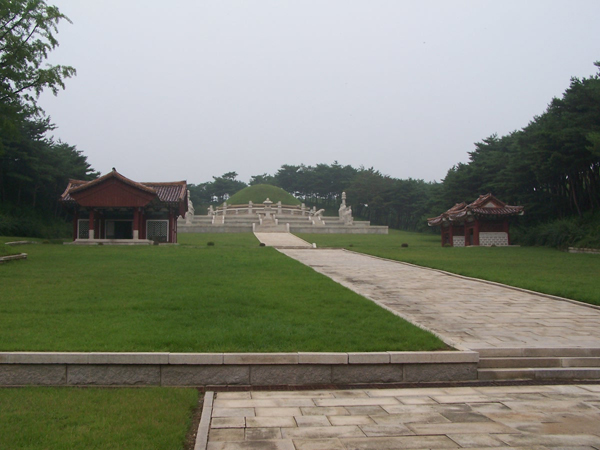
- The Tomb of King Wanggon

Korean name
- Hangul: 고려왕릉
- Hanja: 高麗王陵
- RR: Goryeo wangneung
- MR: Koryŏ wangnŭng

The Royal Tombs of the Goryeo Dynasty are a group of tombs of members of the Korean Goryeo Dynasty (918 – 1392).

== The tombs ==
The royal tombs are scattered around southwestern North Hwanghae Province, with most of them located within 20 kilometers of Kaesong, the Goryeo capital. Most tombs are located in Kaepung County, which borders Kaesong to the west, though there are also a significant number in Changpung County, which borders Kaesong to the east. Some tombs, all unidentified, are also located within Kaesong itself.

Koryo-era royal tombs followed the guidelines outlined in Chinese Confucian texts, such as the Book of Rites (Li Ji) and the Rites of Zhou (Zhou Li). Many factors went into consideration when deciding the location of a tomb, such as the distance from Kaesong, the distance in relation to other royal tombs, the accessibility of the location, and the tradition of Feng Shui (known as 'Pungsu' in Korean). The tomb construction also took into account traditional burial rituals of Korea and the natural environment.

=== Hyonnung ===
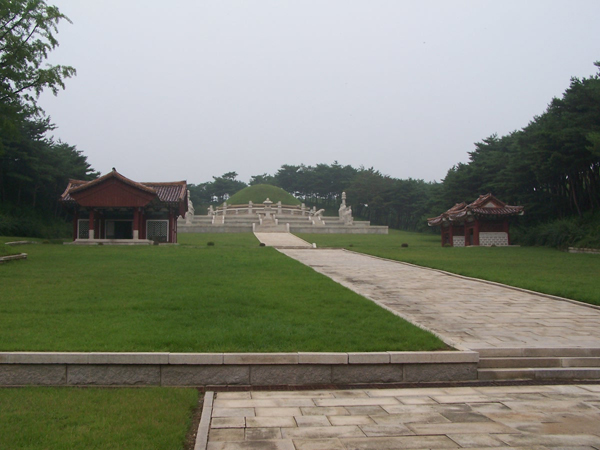
Hyonneung - Tomb of King Taejo

37°59′6″N 126°30′19″E
Hyonrung (현릉; 顯陵), also known as the Tomb of King Wanggon, is the tomb of King Taejo (877-943, r. 918-943), founder of the Koryo dynasty. Taejo, who adopted that name upon ascending the throne, was the first king to unify the entire Korean peninsula after subjugation the southern states of Silla and Paekje. Construction on the tomb began after the king's death in 943. He was buried with his favorite wife, Queen Sinhye. The tomb was heavily reconstructed in 1994, and all of the original buildings and statues were cleared away in order to accomplish its "restoration". Today, the burial chamber is open to tourists, and displays the coffins containing the remains of Taejo and his queen, as well as the tomb's original carved decorations. Hyonrung is located on the side of Mt. Mansu in Haeson-ri, Kaepung County, and is listed as North Korean National Treasure #179. In the valley behind the tomb is the Chilrunggun, a group of seven tombs containing the remains of various princes, princesses, and concubines.

=== Chongrung ===
37°51′29″N 126°33′35″E
Chongrung (정릉; 貞陵) is the tomb of Queen Sinsong, a wife of King Taejo. The tomb is in poor condition, with only its earthen burial mound and some stone pillars remaining. It is located in Hwagok-ri, Kaepung County, and is listed as North Korean Cultural Asset #573.

=== Anrung ===
37°56′58″N 126°33′17″E
Anrung (안릉; 安陵) is the burial place of King Jongjong (923-949, r. 946-949), third monarch of the Koryo dynasty. It is in fair condition, with its burial mound, with stone base, and two guardian statues intact. Wall murals found in the burial chamber depict landscapes and hunting scenes, while the ceiling is painted with 28 stars and six constellations. The murals in the tomb are considered an important link to earlier Koguryo tomb art. Anrung is located on the south face of Kaesong's Namsan in Konam-ri, Kaepung County, next to Yangrung. It is listed as North Korean Cultural Asset #552.

=== Honrung ===
38°2′24″N 126°31′19″E
Honrung (헌릉; 憲陵) is the tomb of King Kwangjong (925-975, r. 949-975), fourth monarch of the Koryo dynasty. The tomb survives in fair condition, though it is missing its guardian statues. It is located in Samgo-ri, Kaesong, and is listed as North Korean Cultural Asset #545.

=== Yongrung ===
37°56′4″N 126°35′26″E
Yongrung (영릉; 榮陵) contains the remains of King Kyongjong (955-981, r. 975-981), fifth monarch of the Koryo dynasty. The tomb is good condition, with its original stone railings and guardian statues. It is located on the side of Mt. Jinbong in Panmun, Kaepung County, and is listed as North Korean Cultural Asset #569.

=== Kangrung ===
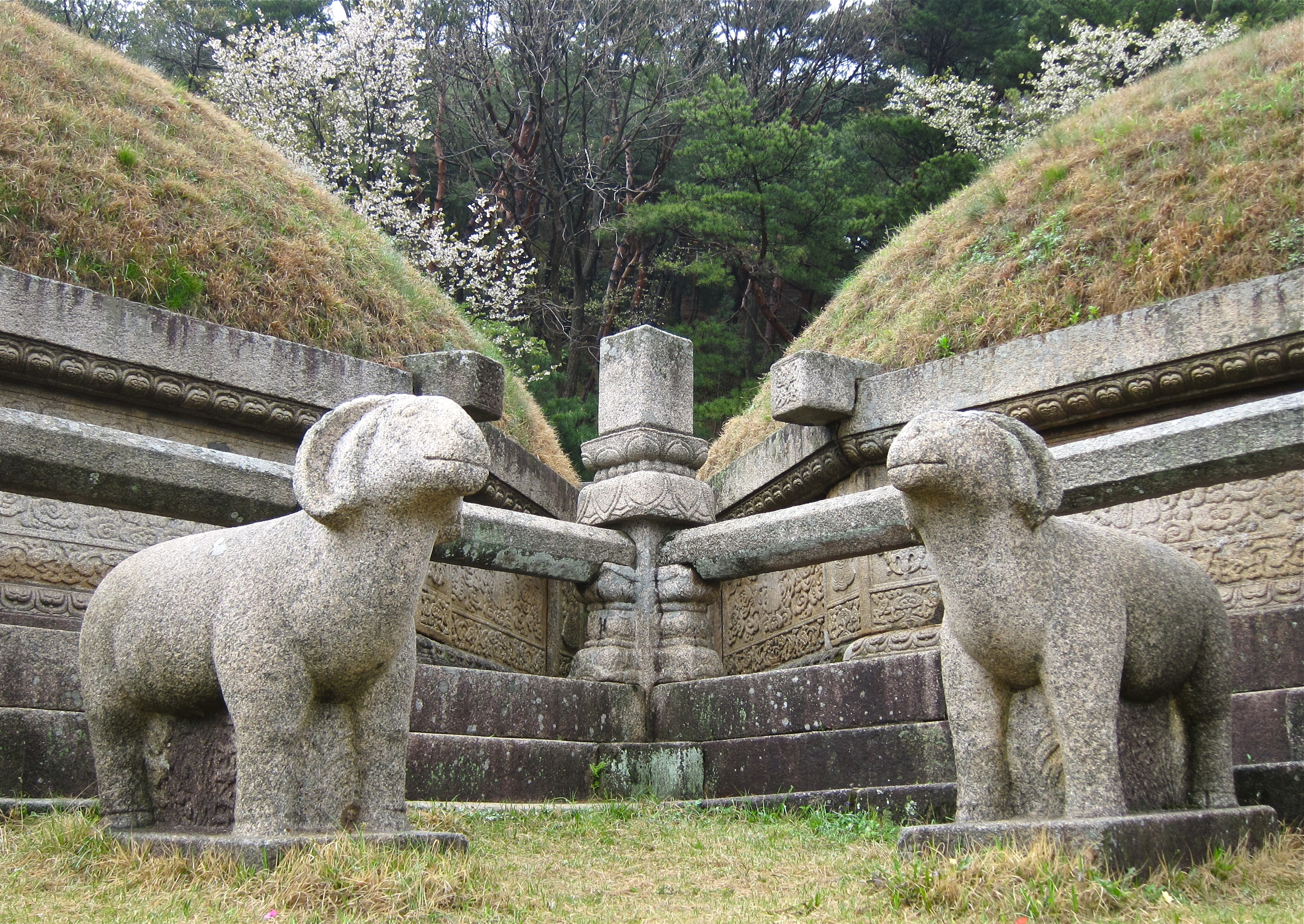
Hyonjongrung - Tomb of King Kongmin

37°56′9″N 126°33′26″E
Kangrung (강릉; 康陵) is the tomb of King Songjong (960-997, r. 981-997), sixth monarch of the Koryo dynasty. Nothing remains of his tomb but its earthen burial mound. It is located near Jinbong-ri, Kaepung County, and is listed as North Korean Cultural Asset #567.

=== Sonrung Cluster ===
37°59′36″N 126°30′16″E
Sonrung (선릉; 宣陵) is the burial place of King Hyonjong (992-1031, r. 1009–1031), eighth monarch of the Koryo dynasty. Next to his grave are two tombs known as Sonrunggun Tomb #2 & 3, which contain the remains of two unknown relatives. Though Sonrung is in good condition, the other two are in a state of disrepair, with Tomb #3 in addition having lost its guardian deities. The three graves are located in Haeson-ri, Kaepung County, and are listed as North Korean Cultural Asset #547.

=== Konrung & Wonrung ===
38°3′41″N 126°36′1″E/38°3′38″N 126°36′4″E
Konrung (건릉; 乾陵) and Wonrung (원릉/元陵) are respectively the tombs of Anjong and Queen Honjong, the parents of King Hyonjong. The tombs are in good condition, though not particularly elaborate. The two graves are located in Hyonhwa Valley in Wolgo-ri, Changpung County. They are listed as North Korean Cultural Assets #572 & 571, respectively.

=== Kyongrung ===
38°0′27″N 126°39′39″E
Kyongrung (경릉; 景陵) is the tomb of King Munjong (1019–1083, r. 1046–1083), 11th monarch of the Koryo dynasty. Though his tomb remains intact, it is severely weathered. It is located in Kyongrung-dong near Sonjuk-ri, Changpung County, and is listed as North Korean Cultural Asset #570.

=== Songrung ===
37°56′16″N 126°32′59″E
Songrung (성릉; 成陵) is the burial place of King Sunjong (1047–1083, r. 1083), 12th monarch of the Koryo dynasty, who died within a year of ascending the throne. His tomb is very small, but in intact. It is located near Jinbong-ri in Kaepung County, and is listed as North Korean Cultural Asset #568.

=== Yurung ===
37°56′15″N 126°32′56″E

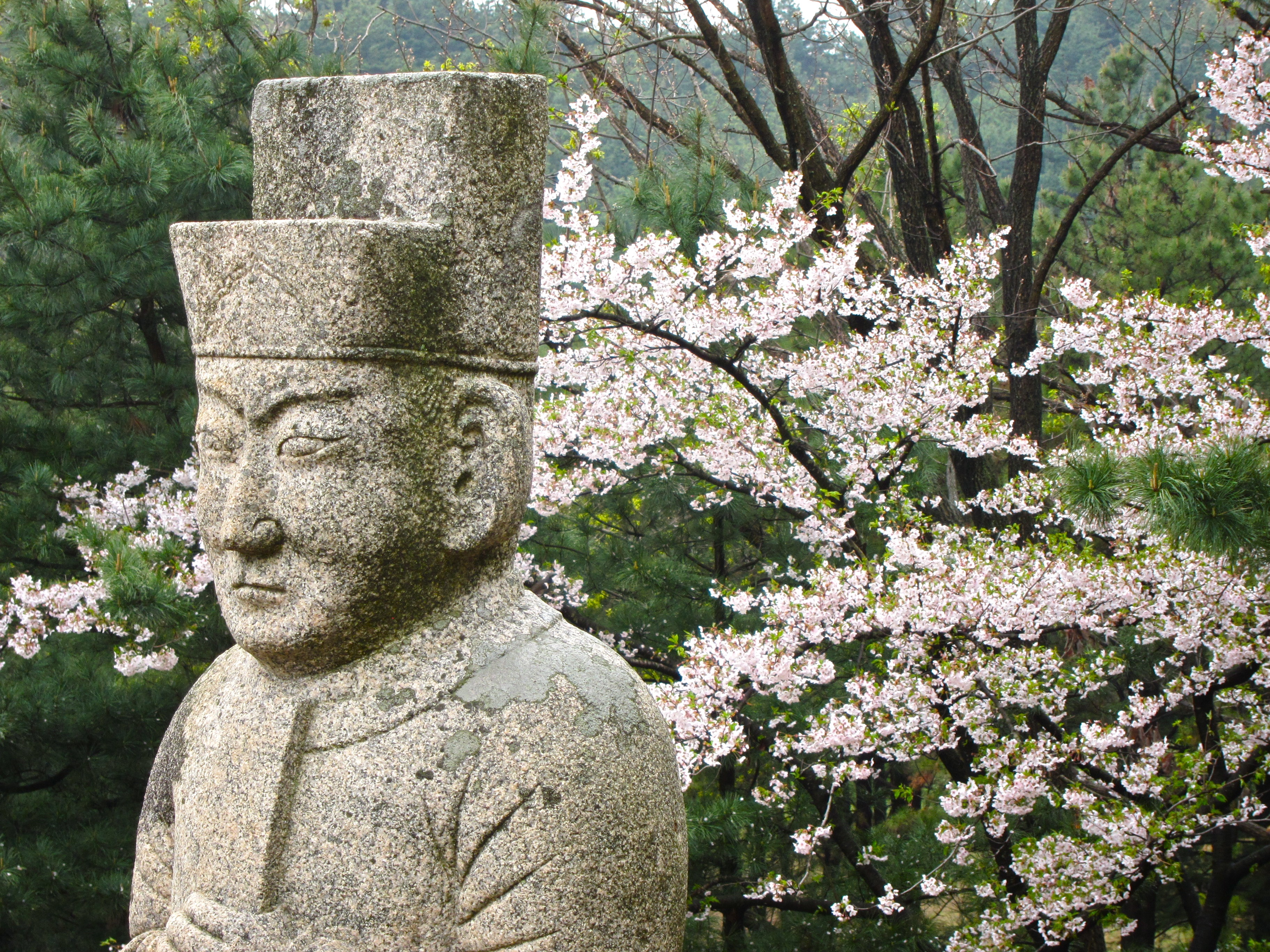
Hyonjongrung - Tomb of King Kongmin

Yurung (유릉; 裕陵) contains the remains of King Yejong (1097–1122, r. 1105–1122), 16th monarch of the Koryo dynasty. Almost nothing remains of it. It is located near Osan-ri in Kaepung County.

=== Yangrung ===
37°56′55″N 126°33′27″E
Yangrung (양릉; 陽陵) is the tomb of King Sinjong (1144–1204, r. 1197–1204), 20th monarch of the Koryo dynasty. It is in poor condition, with only the earthen burial mound and one guardian statue still remaining. Slightly damaged wall murals found in the burial chamber depict 158 dogs, while the ceiling is decorated with constellations including the Big Dipper. As with Anrung, the murals in the tomb are considered an important link to earlier Koguryo tomb art. Yangrung is located on the south face of Kaesong's Namsan in Konam-ri, Kaepung County, next to Anrung. It is listed as North Korean Cultural Asset #553.

=== Hurung ===
Hurung (후릉; 厚陵) contains the remains of King Kangjong (1152–1213, r. 1211–1213), 22nd monarch of the Koryo dynasty. Almost nothing remains of it. It is located near Hyonhwa-ri in Kaepung County. It is not to be confused with the nearby tomb of the same name belonging to King Jongjong of the Choson dynasty.

=== Sorung Cluster ===
38°1′22″N 126°32′54″E
Sorung (소릉; 昭陵) is the burial place of King Wonjong (1214–1274, r. 1260–1274), 24th monarch of the Koryo dynasty. Wonjong was the last Koguryo monarch to be titled Temple name due to the Mongol invasion. Near to his grave are five tombs known as Sorunggun Tombs #2, 3, 4, and 5, which contain the remains of four unknown relatives. With the exception of Tomb #3, all of the tombs are in good repair. The five graves are located in Sorung Valley in Ryonghung-dong, Kaesong, and are listed as North Korean Cultural Asset #562.

=== Myongrung Cluster ===
37°58′53″N 126°29′55″E
Myongrung (명릉; 明陵) is the burial place of King Chungmok (1337–1348, r. 1344–1348), 29th monarch of the Koryo dynasty. Near to his grave are two tombs known as Myongrunggun Tombs #2 and 3, which contain the remains of two unknown relatives. The tombs are all in fair condition, weathered but intact. The three graves are located in Yonrung-ri in Kaepung County; Myongrung itself is listed as North Korean Cultural Asset #549, while the Tombs #2 and 3 are listed as Cultural Asset #169.

=== Hyonjongrung ===
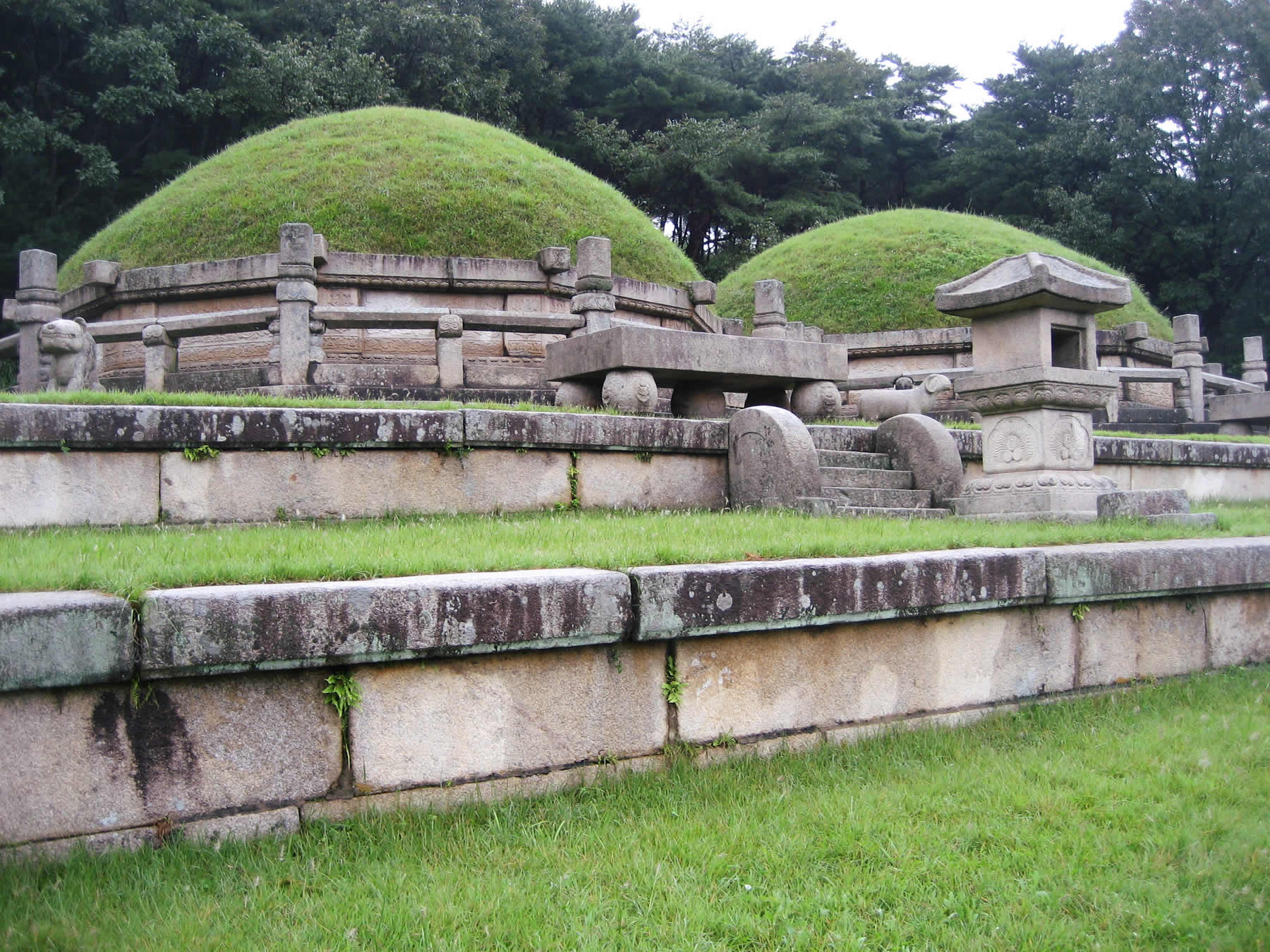
Hyonjongrung - Tomb of King Kongmin

37°58′55″N 126°28′23″E
Hyonjongrung (현정릉; 玄正陵), better known as the Tomb of King Kongmin is the burial place of King Kongmin (1330–1374, r. 1351–1374), 31st monarch of the Koryo dynasty, and his wife, the Mongolian princess Noguk. It is the best-preserved of the Koryo dynasty royal tombs, and a popular tourist site. Construction on the tombs began after Princess Noguk's death in 1365, and was completed seven years later in 1372. The tombs consist of a carved granite base topped with a small hill; they are surrounded by statues of sheep and tigers, representing the nations of Korea and Mongolia respectively. The "spirit road" up to the tombs is lined with statues of military officers and Confucian officials. Their placement was an important consideration for the king, and many geomancers, astrologers, and mathematicians were consulted to make sure the site had good feng shui. Unfortunately, the tomb's relics were lost in 1905 when the tomb chamber was blasted open with dynamite and looted by the Japanese; most of the relics inside were believed to be taken to Japan, though Kongmin's coffin is exhibited in the Koryo Museum in Kaesong. The tomb is located in Haeson-ri, Kaepung County, and is listed as North Korean National Treasure #123.

== See also ==
- Royal Tombs of the Joseon Dynasty
- Koryo Dynasty
