= Punsansŏng =

Fortress in Gimhae, South Korea

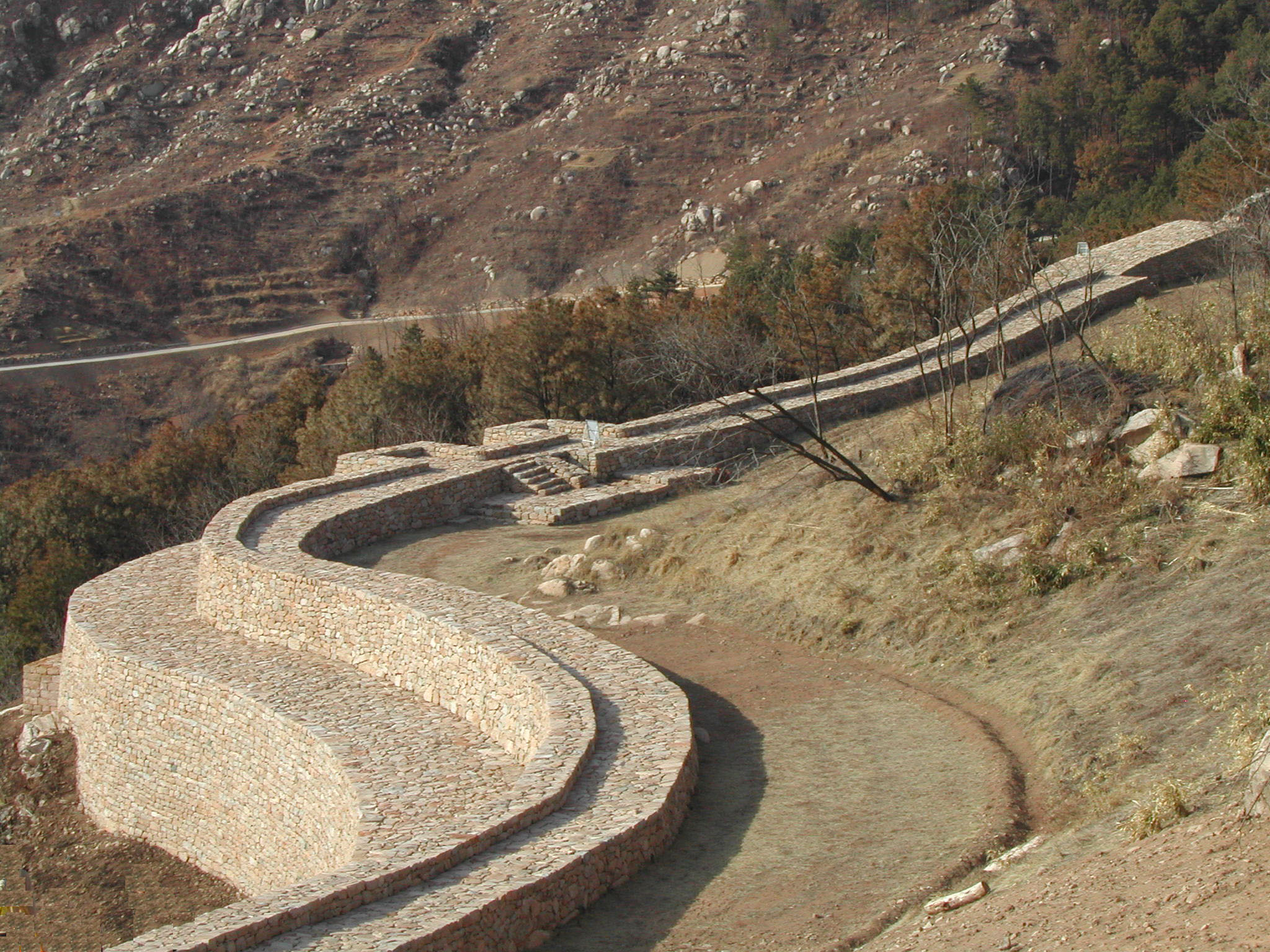
- Part of the fortress
- Interactive map of the Punsansŏng area

General information
- Location: Bunsan, Gimhae, South Korea
- Coordinates: 35°14′41″N 128°53′32″E

Design and construction
- Designations

Historic Sites of South Korea
- Official name: Bunsanseong Fortress, Gimhae
- Designated: 1963-01-21
- Reference no.: 66

Punsansŏng (Korean: 분산성; Hanja: 盆山城; RR: Bunsanseong) is a Gaya-era Korean fortress on the mountain Bunsan in what is now Gimhae, South Korea. On January 21, 1963, it was made a Historic Site of South Korea.

The fortress was built some time during the Gaya confederacy (42–562, Korean calendar). It was renovated some time in the Goryeo period. During the Joseon period, it was renovated by Pak Wi in the 14th century to defend against wokou (Japanese pirates). It is attested to in the 1530 geography book Sinjŭng Tongguk yŏji sŭngnam as being in disrepair. It was severely destroyed during the 1592–1598 Imjin War. It was repaired in 1871. It was excavated in 1998 and restored in 2002.

The fortress walls are around 3 to 4 m (9.8 to 13.1 ft) high. Many parts have collapsed, but the north and west sections are in good condition. Various parts of the wall were constructed in different methods, indicating the different repairs and renovations made over time.
