= Kwaksan station =

Railway station in North Korea

Coordinates: 39°41′4″N 125°4′45″E

Kwaksan 곽산
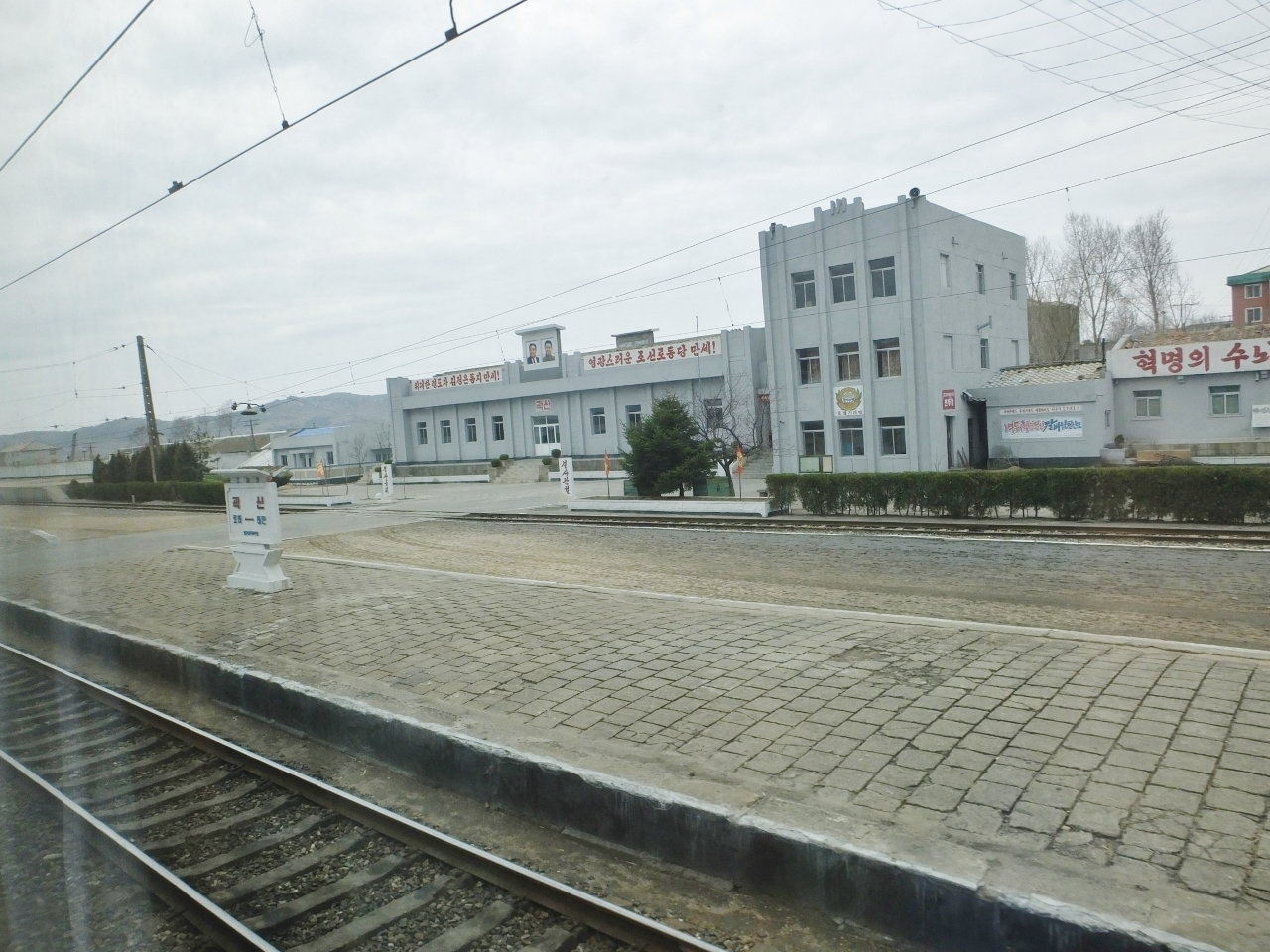

Korean name
- Hangul: 곽산역
- Hanja: 郭山驛
- Revised Romanization: Gwaksan-yeok
- McCune–Reischauer: Kwaksan-yŏk

General information
- Location: Kwaksan-ŭp, Kwaksan County, North P'yŏngan Province; North Korea
- Owner: Korean State Railway

History
- Opened: 5 November 1905

Services
Preceding station	Korean State Railway	Following station
Roha towards Dandong (China)	P'yŏngŭi Line	Hadan towards P'yŏngyang
Location

Kwaksan station is a railway station in Kwaksan-ŭp, Kwaksan County, North P'yŏngan Province, North Korea. It is on located on the P'yŏngŭi Line of the Korean State Railway.
