= Roha station =

Railway station in Kwaksan County, North Korea

Coordinates: 39.7367°N 124.9851°E

Roha 로하

Korean name
- Hangul: 로하역
- Hanja: 路下驛
- Revised Romanization: Noha-yeok
- McCune–Reischauer: Roha-yŏk

General information
- Location: Kwaksan-ŭp, Kwaksan County, North P'yŏngan Province; North Korea
- Owner: Korean State Railway

Services
Preceding station	Korean State Railway	Following station
Sŏnch'ŏn towards Dandong (China)	P'yŏngŭi Line	Kwaksan towards P'yŏngyang
Location

Roha station is a railway station in Kwaksan-ŭp, Kwaksan County, North P'yŏngan Province, North Korea. It is on located on the P'yŏngŭi Line of the Korean State Railway.
