= Sonchon station =

Railway station in Sonchon County, North Korea

Coordinates: 39°47′56″N 124°55′8″E

Sŏnch'ŏn 선천
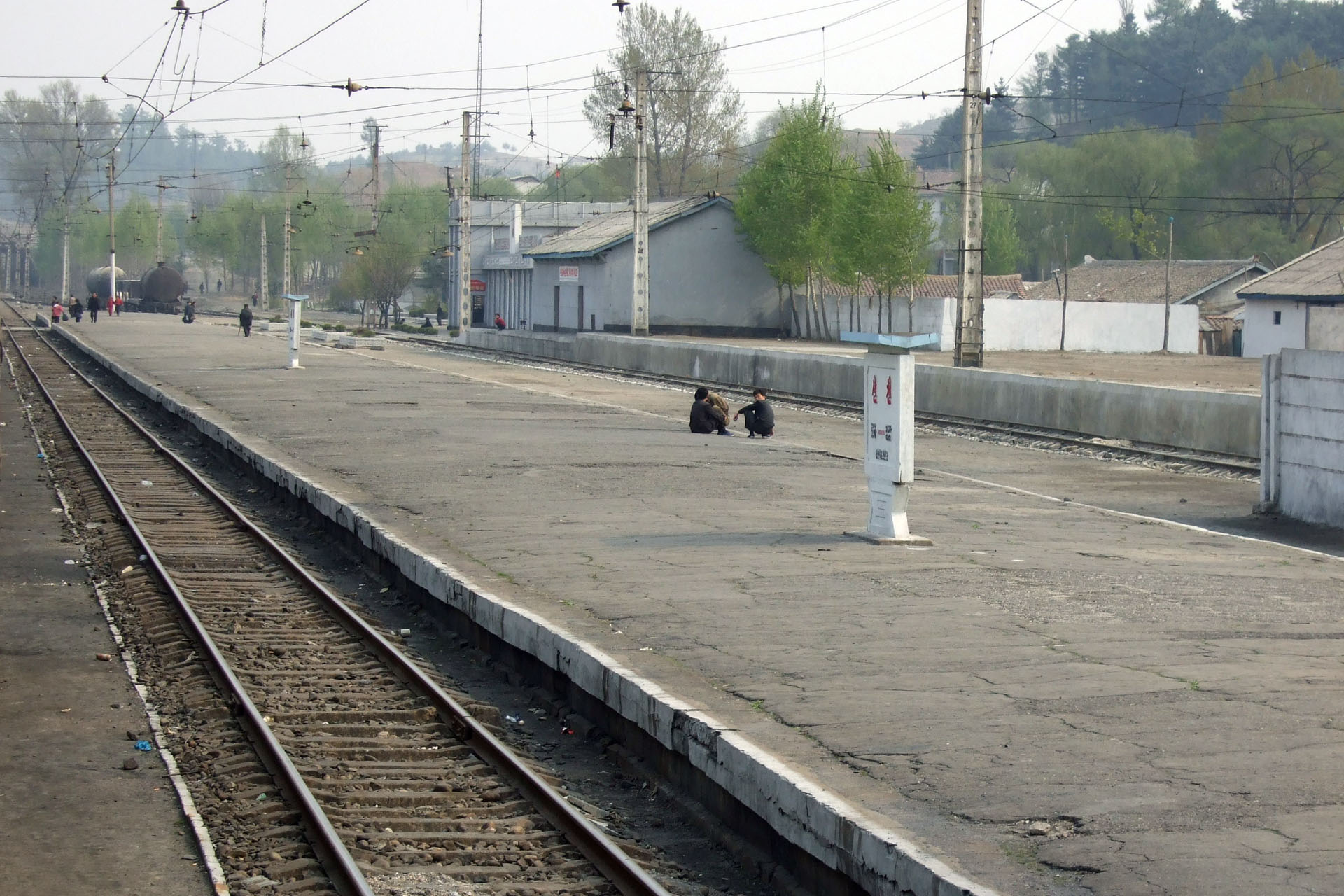
- A view of the platform at Sŏnch'ŏn station

Korean name
- Hangul: 선천역
- Hanja: 宣川驛
- Revised Romanization: Seoncheon-yeok
- McCune–Reischauer: Sŏnch'ŏn-yŏk

General information
- Location: Sŏnch'ŏn-ŭp, Sŏnch'ŏn, North P'yŏngan; North Korea
- Owner: Korean State Railway

History
- Opened: 5 November 1905
- Original company: Chosen Government Railway

Services
Preceding station	Korean State Railway	Following station
Ch'ŏnggang towards Dandong (China)	P'yŏngŭi Line	Roha towards P'yŏngyang
Location

Sŏnch'ŏn station is a railway station in Sŏnch'ŏn-ŭp, Sŏnch'ŏn County, North P'yŏngan Province, North Korea. It is on located on the P'yŏngŭi Line of the Korean State Railway.

== History ==
The station was opened, along with the rest of this section of the Kyŏngŭi Line, on 5 November 1905 by the Chosen Government Railway.

After the bridge across the Yalu River was opened on 1 November 1911, connecting Sinŭiju to Dandong, China, Sŏnch'ŏn station became a stop for international trains to and from Manchuria. It is still a stopping point for international trains between P'yŏngyang and Beijing.

On 27 December 1910, Korean independence activist An Myŏng-gŭn, cousin of An Chung-gŭn (who had assassinated Ito Hirobumi the previous year), attempted to assassinate the Japanese Governor-General of Korea, Terauchi Masatake, at Sŏnch'ŏn station; this was one of the precursors to the 105-Man Incident.
