= Tosan Gung clan =

Korean clan from North Hwanghae Province

- Country: Korea
- Current region: Tosan County
- Founder: Gung Heum

Tosan Gung clan (Korean: 토산 궁씨; Hanja: 兎山 弓氏) is one of the Korean clans. Their Bon-gwan is in Tosan County, North Hwanghae Province. According to the research held in 2000, the number of the Tosan Gung clan was 555. The word “Gung clan” originated from clan in China. Their founder was Gung Heum. He was from Taiyuan, China. He founded Gija Joseon with Gija after Shang dynasty ended.

== See also ==
- Korean clan names of foreign origin
