= Yontan County =

Yŏnt‘an County 연탄군
- County

Korean transcription(s)
  - Hanja: 燕灘郡
  - McCune-Reischauer: Yŏnt‘an-gun
  - Revised Romanization: Yeontan-gun
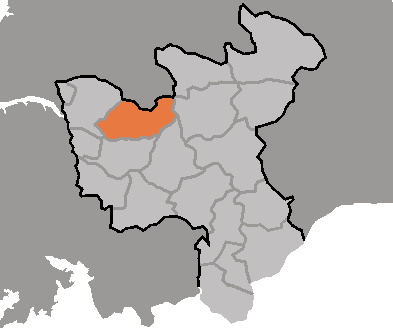
- Map of North Hwanghae showing the location of Yontan
- Country: North Korea
- Province: North Hwanghae Province

Area
  - Total: 548.4 km^{2} (211.7 sq mi)

Population (2008)
  - Total: 73,032
  - Density: 133.2/km^{2} (344.9/sq mi)

Yŏnt‘an County is a county in North Hwanghae province, North Korea.

== Name ==
The name Yontan means "a fast stream like a swallow", which refers to the river that is fast that exists in the region.

== History ==
The county was newly created in 1952 from Myons from Hwangju County, Suan County and Sŏhŭng County.After Hwanghae Province was divided into North and south in 1954, the region became a county of North Hwanghae Province.

== Administrative divisions ==
Yŏnt‘an county is divided into 1 ŭp (town) and 16 ri (villages):

- Yŏnt‘an-ŭp
- Chang'ul-li
- Ch'angmae-ri
- Ch'ilbong-ri
- Kŭmbong-ri
- Misal-li
- Munhwa-ri
- Obong-ri
- Pongjae-ri
- P'ungdap-ri
- Sin'gŭm-ri
- Sinhŭng-ri
- Songjung-ri
- Sŏngmae-ri
- Subong-ri
- Toch'i-ri
- Wŏllyong-ri

== Religion ==
Due to the atheistic policy of North Korea, it is hard to find the demographics of the area. Before 1945, the region had a catholic parish called the Hwangju parish that was founded in 1902 and extinct in 1919.

== Industry ==
The county currently cultivates Choke berries(called Tannamu(단나무)) since 1985(at the period of the 40th anniversary of the founding of the WPK). The region also artificially incubates eggs of Common pheasants, since the hunting of the birds were popular in the region. In 2023, North Korean government completed the construction of the Hwangju Kindung waterway project that covers the area. In January 2025, it was announced that a new factory was built in the region.

== Geography and geology ==
The county has a lake called Yontan lake, which was artificially created by blocking the upstream of the Hwangju river in 1974. The lake is connected to the Yesong river and Sohung lake in nearby Sohung County. The region has a lot of mountainous ranges, such as the Eonjin and Jongbang mountainous ranges.The county is also known for its waterfall located in the south of the county.

== Notable places ==
- Simwonsa:Buddhist temple built in the Goryeo dynasty
- Goguryeo tombs of Songjung-ri
- The Yontan Odok-ri goindol: A Bronze Age dolmen located in the region. The excavation and inspection of the site was conducted in 1971.
