= Simwonsa (Yontan) =

- Hangul: 심원사
- Hanja: 心源寺
- RR: Simwonsa
- MR: Simwŏnsa

Simwŏnsa is a Korean Buddhist temple located in Yŏntan-gun, North Hwanghae Province, North Korea. The temple contains one of the oldest wooden buildings in North Korea, as well as a famous peach tree and stupas from the late Koryo dynasty.

- Pogwang Hall (보광전/普光殿)

Built in 1374, is the fourth oldest wooden building in North Korea, and houses a painting by the famous Neo-Confucian scholar Yi Saek. The hall is notable for its elaborate doors decorated with carved lotus blossoms, fish, birds, and snakes.

- Ungjin Hall (응진전/雄津殿)

The former monk's dormitory, this simple hall now houses the complex's caretakers.

== See also ==
- National Treasures of North Korea
- Korean Buddhism
- Korean architecture
