= Jangdan County =

Former county in between North and South Korea

- Hangul: 장단군
- Hanja: 長湍郡
- RR: Jangdan-gun
- MR: Changdan-gun

Jangdan County (Korean: 장단군) is a former county in Gyeonggi Province in Korea, which was divided into a northern part and a southern part when the USA and the Soviet Union jointly partitioned the Korean peninsula into two (the former controlled the southern half while the latter took over the northern half) during the division of Korea at the end of the Second World War towards the end of 1945. The northern part of Jangdan County has since been merged into Changpung County in North Korea while the former county's southern part now makes up Yeoncheon County and the city of Paju in South Korea (the northern and the southern parts of Jangdan County are still situated along the border between North Korea and South Korea, which used to be positioned on the 38th Parallel but is now located at the Korean Demilitarized Zone (the Korean DMZ).
