= Songhwa County =

Songhwa County 송화군
- County

Korean transcription(s)
  - Hanja: 松禾郡
  - McCune-Reischauer: Songhwa-kun
  - Revised Romanization: Songhwa-gun
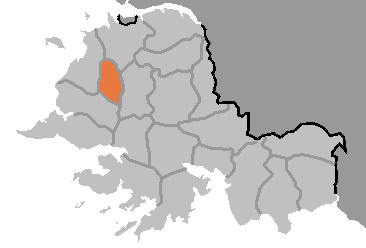
- Country: North Korea
- Province: South Hwanghae Province

Area
  - Total: 193.2 km^{2} (74.6 sq mi)

Population (2008)
  - Total: 44,274
  - Density: 229.2/km^{2} (593.5/sq mi)

Songhwa County is a county in South Hwanghae province, North Korea.

== Administrative divisions ==
Songhwa county is divided into 1 ŭp (town) and 10 ri (villages):

- Songhwa-ŭp(송화읍,松禾邑)
- Hŭngam-ri(홍암리,鴻岩里)
- Kutal-li(구탄리)
- Kwanyang-ri(관양리)
- Myŏngrye-ri(명례리)
- Onch'ŏl-li(온천리)
- Ryongho-ri(룡호리)
- Sujung-ri(수증리)
- Taam-ri(다암리)
- Wŏndang-ri(원당리)
- Yaksal-li(약산리)

== History ==
The area was called Kuŭlhyŏn (仇乙縣) or Kulch'ŏn (屈遷) in the Koguryŏ era. It became part of Songhwa County in 1895, and in March 1909, Songhwa County was merged with P'ungch'ŏn County. Songhwa county was recreated in the 1952 reorganisation of North Korea's administrative divisions. The northwestern section of the county was split off in 1967 to create Kwail county.

== Transportation ==
Songhwa county is served by the Changyŏn and Ŭllyul lines of the Korean State Railway.
