= Maengsan County =

Maengsan County 맹산군
- County

Korean transcription(s)
  - Chosŏn'gŭl: 맹산군
  - Hancha: 孟山郡
  - McCune-Reischauer: Maengsan-gun
  - Revised Romanization: Maengsan-gun
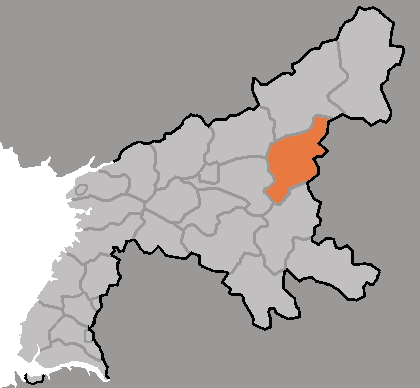
- Map of South Pyongan showing the location of Maengsan
- Country: North Korea
- Province: South P'yŏngan
- Administrative divisions: 1 ŭp, 24 ri

Area
  - Total: 723.13 km^{2} (279.20 sq mi)

Population (2008)
  - Total: 48,155
  - Density: 66.592/km^{2} (172.47/sq mi)

Maengsan County is a kun (county) in South P'yŏngan, North Korea.

== Administrative districts ==
The district is split into one ŭp (town) and 24 ri (villages):

- Maengsan-ŭp (맹산읍)
- Changdong-ri (장동리)
- Chisŏng-ri (지성리)
- Chŏngp'yŏng-ri (정평리)
- Chunghŭng-ri (중흥리)
- Inhŭng-ri (인흥리)
- Kiyang-ri (기양리)
- Kwanghwa-ri (광화리)
- Maehyang-ri (매향리)
- P'ungjŏl-li (풍전리)
- P'yŏngji-ri (평지리)
- Ryongam-ri (룡암리)
- Ryŏngul-li (령운리)
- Saemaŭl-li (새마을리)
- Sinhŭng-ri (신흥리)
- Sinsang-ri (신상리)
- Siŏng-ri (시억리)
- Songgwang-ri (송광리)
- Songsil-li (송산리)
- Sujŏl-li (수전리)
- Sup'o-ri (주포리)
- Taehŭng-ri (대흥리)
- Ŭnp'o-ri (은포리)
- Yangsal-li (양산리)
- Yusŭng-ri (유승리)
