= Sukchon County =

Sukch'ŏn County 숙천군
- County

Korean transcription(s)
  - Chosŏn'gŭl: 숙천군
  - Hancha: 肅川郡
  - McCune-Reischauer: Sukch'ŏn-gun
  - Revised Romanization: Sukcheon-gun
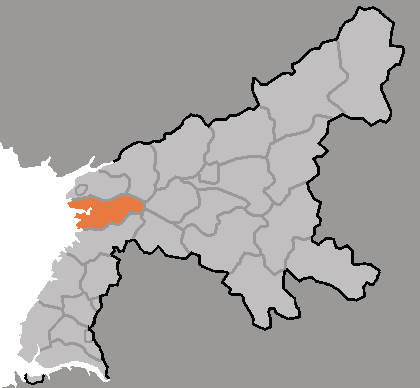
- Map of South Pyongan showing the location of Sukchon
- Country: North Korea
- Province: South P'yŏngan
- Administrative divisions: 1 ŭp, 1 workers' district, 20 ri

Area
  - Total: 418.96 km^{2} (161.76 sq mi)

Population (2008)
  - Total: 178,509
  - Density: 426.08/km^{2} (1,103.5/sq mi)

Sukch'ŏn County is a kun (county) in South P'yŏngan province, North Korea.

== Administrative divisions ==
Sukch'ŏn county is divided into 1 ŭp (town), 1 rodongjagu (workers' districts) and 20 ri (villages):

- Sukch'ŏn-ŭp (숙천읍)
- Namyang-rodongjagu (남양로동자구)
- Changhŭng-ri (장흥리)
- Ch'angdong-ri (창동리)
- Ch'illi-ri (칠리리)
- Haebil-li (해빛리)
- Hŭng'o-ri (흥오리)
- Kŏmhŭng-ri (검흥리)
- Kŏmsal-li (검산리)
- Kŭmp'ung-ri (금풍리)
- Kwangch'ŏl-li (광천리)
- Paeg'am-ri (백암리)
- P'yŏnghwa-ri (평화리)
- Ryongdŏng-ri (룡덕리)
- Sasal-li (사산리)
- Sinhŭng-ri (신흥리)
- Sinp'ung-ri (신풍리)
- Songdŏng-ri (송덕리)
- Ssang'ul-li (쌍운리)
- Taesŏng-ri (대성리)
- Unjŏng-ri (운정리)
- Yakchŏl-li (약전리)

== Transportation ==
Sukch'ŏn county is served by the P'yŏngŭi, P'yŏngnam and Sŏhae lines of the Korean State Railway.
