= Songchon County =

Sŏngch'ŏn County 성천군
- County

Korean transcription(s)
  - Chosŏn'gŭl: 성천군
  - Hancha: 成川郡
  - McCune-Reischauer: Sŏngch'ŏn-gun
  - Revised Romanization: Seongcheon-gun
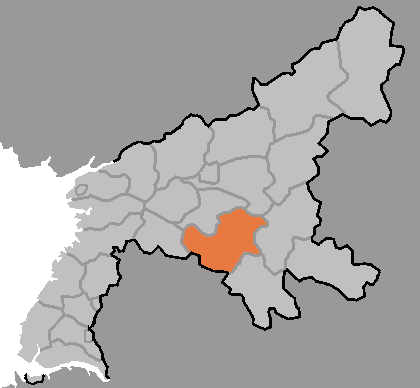
- Map of South Pyongan showing the location of Songchon
- Country: North Korea
- Province: South P'yŏngan
- Administrative divisions: 1 ŭp, 3 workers' districts, 20 ri

Area
  - Total: 724 km^{2} (280 sq mi)

Population (2008)
  - Total: 149,809
  - Density: 207/km^{2} (536/sq mi)

Sŏngch'ŏn County is a kun (county) in South P'yŏngan, North Korea.

== Administrative divisions ==
Sŏngch'ŏn county is divided into 1 ŭp (town), 3 rodongjagu (workers' districts) and 20 ri (villages):

- Sŏngch'ŏn-ŭp (성천읍)
- Changrim-rodongjagu (장림로동자구)
- Kunja-rodongjagu (군자로동자구)
- Ŭngong-rodongjagu (은곡로동자구)
- Amp'o-ri (암포리)
- Changsam-ri (장삼리)
- Hyangbung-ri (향붕리)
- Hwich'ŏl-li (회천리)
- Kich'ang-ri (기창리)
- Kŏhŭng-ri (거흥리)
- Kŭmp'yŏng-ri (금평리)
- Kyesŏng-ri (계석리)
- Mun'ong-ri (문목리)
- Onjŏng-ri (온정리)
- Paegwŏl-li (백원리)
- Ryonghŭng-ri (룡흥리)
- Ryongsal-li (룡산리)
- Sakch'ang-ri (삭창리)
- Samdŏng-ri (삼덕리)
- Sangha-ri (상하리)
- Sinp'ung-ri (신풍리)
- Taebong-ri (대봉리)
- Tŏg'am-ri (덕암리)
- Unbong-ri (운봉리)

== Transportation ==
Sŏngch'ŏn county is served by the P'yŏngdŏk and P'yŏngra lines of the Korean State Railway.
