= Samsu County =

Samsu County 삼수군
- County

Korean transcription(s)
  - Chosŏn'gŭl: 삼수군
  - Hancha: 三水郡
  - McCune-Reischauer: Samsu-gun
  - Revised Romanization: Samsu-gun
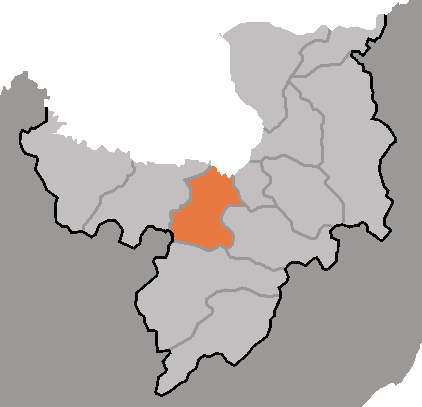
- Map of Ryanggang showing the location of Samsu
- Country: North Korea
- Province: Ryanggang
- Administrative divisions: 1 ŭp, 1 workers' district, 23 ri

Area
  - Total: 874 km^{2} (337 sq mi)

Population (2008)
  - Total: 40,311
  - Density: 46.1/km^{2} (119/sq mi)

Samsu County is a kun, or county, in Ryanggang province, North Korea. Prior to 1954, it was part of South Hamgyŏng province.

== Geography ==
On its northern border, Samsu shares the Yalu River with China. It also shares a border with the province of North P'yŏngan. To the south, it occupies the northern tip of the Kaema Plateau. The southern and western reaches of Samsu abound with mountains. Due to the rugged terrain, transportation is difficult.

The highest peak of Samsu is Turungbong (두릉봉, 1921 m). The chief streams are the Changjin, Chungp'yŏng and Yalu rivers (this is probably the reason for its name, 삼수(三水), which literally means 'three rivers'). Due to its high inland location, Samsu enjoys bitterly cold winters.

== Administrative divisions ==
Samsu county is divided into 1 ŭp (town), 1 rodongjagu (workers' district) and 23 ri (villages):

- Samsu-ŭp (삼수읍)
- P'osŏng-rodongjagu (포성로동자구)
- Chungp'yŏngjang-ri (중평장리)
- Ch'ŏngsu-ri (청수리)
- Ch'ŏnnam-ri (천남리)
- Hwagol-li (회골리)
- Iljadong-ri (일자봉리)
- Kaeunsŏng-ri (개운성리)
- Kallyŏng-ri (간령리)
- Kwandong-ri (관동리)
- Kwangsaeng-ri (광생리)
- Kwanhŭng-ri (관흥리)
- Kwanp'yŏng-ri (관평리)
- Kwansŏ-ri (관서리)
- Pallyonggi-ri (반룡기리)
- Pongsu-ri (동수리)
- Pŏnp'o-ri (번포리)
- P'ungdŏng-ri (풍덕리)
- Ryongbuktong-ri (룡복동리)
- Ryŏngsŏng-ri (령성리)
- Simgong-ri (심곡리)
- Simp'odong-ri (심포동리)
- Sinjŏl-li (신전리)
- Sinyang-ri (신양리)
- Wŏndong-ri (원동리)

== Economy ==
The chief industries in Samsu are logging and farming. Despite the rugged terrain, rice cultivation is widespread; in addition, slash-and-burn agriculture is practiced in the high fields. Local crops include potatoes, maize, soybeans, oats and rye. The Yalu is used to ship rough logs downstream. There are also local deposits of gold ore.

== Transportation ==
The Pukbunaeryuk Line of the Korean State Railway serves the county, as do various conventional roads. There are multiple roads going out to Kanggye and Hyesan, but all have checkpoints.

== See also ==
- Geography of North Korea
- Administrative divisions of North Korea
- Ryanggang
