= Changpung County =

Changpung County 장풍군
- County

Korean transcription(s)
  - Hanja: 長豊郡
  - McCune-Reischauer: Changp'ung-gun
  - Revised Romanization: Jangpung-gun
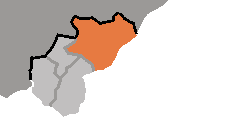
- Map of Kaesong Special City showing the location of Changpung
- Country: North Korea
- Special city: Kaesŏng-T'ŭkpyŏlsi
- Administrative divisions: 1 ŭp, 18 ri

Area
  - Total: 533 km^{2} (206 sq mi)

Population (2008)
  - Total: 69,104
  - Density: 130/km^{2} (336/sq mi)

Changp'ung County (Korean: 장풍군) is a county in Kaesong city province, North Korea. Formerly part of the Kaesong urban area, the county was merged with North Hwanghae when Kaesong was demoted in 2003. However, it was returned to Kaesong Special City in 2023. (Note: The image at the top of the NKnews article cited is a frame from a KCNA weather report on 1/20/24, showing that Kaesong has been expanded back to its former size.) The county sits northeast of Kaesong city and borders Kumchon County, Tosan, Kaesong city, and the Kaesong Industrial Region.

== Administrative divisions ==
The county is divided into one town (ŭp) and 22 villages (ri).

- Changp'ung-ŭp
  (장풍읍/長豊邑)
- Chaha-ri
  (자하리/紫霞里)
- Kuhwa-ri
  (구화리/九化里)
- Sŏkch'ol-li
  (석촌리/石村里)
- Changjwa-ri
  (장좌리/長佐里)
- Kagok-ri
  (가곡리/佳谷里)
- Sipt'al-li
  (십탄리/十灘里)
- Wŏlgo-ri
  (월고리/月古里)
- Taedŏksal-li
  (대덕산리/大德山里)
- Sasi-ri
  (사시리/沙是里)
- Ko'ŭp-ri
  (고읍리/古邑里)
- Kukhwa-ri
  (국화리/菊花里)
- Rimgang-ri
  (림강리/臨江里)
- Sŏktul-li
  (석둔리/席屯里)
- Solhyŏl-li
  (솔현리/率賢里)
- Kwijol-li
  (귀존리/貴存里)
- Raengjŏng-ri
  (랭정리/冷井里)
- Kach'ŏl-li
  (가천리/佳川里)
- Changhang-ri
  (장학리/獐鶴里)
- Sa'am-ri
  (사암리/沙岩里)
- Rabu-ri
  (라부리/羅浮里)
- Hangdong-ri
  (항동리/項洞里)
- Sekol-li
  (세골리/세골里)

== See also ==
- Geography of North Korea
- Administrative divisions of North Korea
