= Kwail County =

Kwail County 과일군
- County

Korean transcription(s)
  - Hanja: 과일郡
  - McCune-Reischauer: Kwail-kun
  - Revised Romanization: Gwail-gun
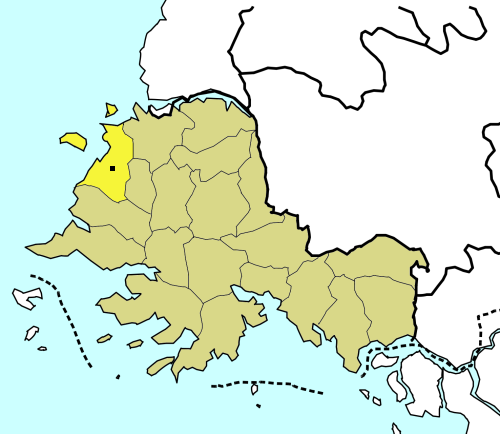
- Coordinates: 38°23′34″N 124°58′22″E
- Country: North Korea
- Province: South Hwanghae Province
- Administrative divisions: 1 ŭp, 24 ri

Area
  - Total: 374 km^{2} (144 sq mi)

Population (2008 est.)
  - Total: 89,895

Kwail is a kun, or county, in South Hwanghae province, North Korea. It faces the Yellow Sea to the west.

The economy of the county is based on the production of fruit. Kwail was created in 1967 from part of Songhwa County, with the intention of making the entire cultivated area of the county into "100 li of blooming orchards". The name Kwail is a Korean word meaning "fruit," and doesn't correspond to any Chinese characters. This makes Kwail County one of the few counties in Korea whose name cannot be written in hanja; for another such county, see Saebyŏl. Marshal Kim Jong Un visited Kwail county in September 2017.

== Geography ==
Forested land account for 44% of the land.

== Administrative divisions ==
Kwail county is divided into 1 ŭp (town) and 24 ri (villages):

- Kwail-ŭp
- Changam-ri
- Ch'ŏngryong-ri
- Ch'ŏnnam-ri
- Nonbŏl-li
- Ojŏng-ri
- Pukch'ang-ri
- P'ogu-ri
- P'unghae-ri
- Ryonghang-ri
- Ryul-li
- Sagi-ri
- Sansu-ri
- Se'gyo-ri
- Sindae-ri
- Sinp'yŏng-ri
- Sŏkto-ri
- Songgong-ri
- Sup'ung-ri
- Tŏg'al-li
- Tŏkchŏng-ri
- Unsal-li
- Wŏlsa-ri
- Yŏmjŏl-li
- Yŏnggwang-ri

== Transportation ==
Kwail county is served by the Ŭllyul Line of the Korean State Railway.

== See also ==
- Geography of North Korea
- Administrative divisions of North Korea
- South Hwanghae
