= Pukchong County =

Pukchong County 북청군
- County

Korean transcription(s)
  - Hanja: 北靑郡
  - McCune-Reischauer: Pukch'ŏng kun
  - Revised Romanization: Bukcheong-gun
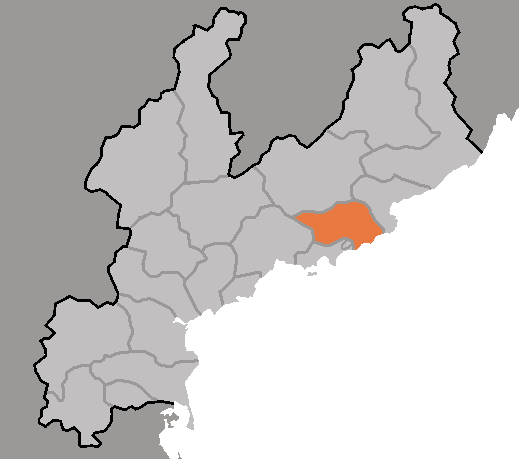
- Map of South Hamgyong showing the location of Pukchong
- Country: North Korea
- Province: South Hamgyong
- Administrative divisions: 1 ŭp, 2 workers' districts, 38 ri

Area
  - Total: 2,375 km^{2} (917 sq mi)

Population (2008)
  - Total: 161,886
  - Density: 68.16/km^{2} (176.5/sq mi)

Pukch'ŏng County is a county in eastern South Hamgyŏng province, North Korea.

== Geography ==
It borders the Sea of Japan (East Sea of Korea) to the south. Away from the coast, it is entirely mountainous. The Hamgyong Mountains traverse the county. The highest point is Komdoksan. Chief streams include the Namdaechon and Pochonchon (보천천). It has a relatively mild climate for the province.

== Administrative divisions ==
Pukch'ŏng county is divided into 1 ŭp (town), 2 rodongjagu (workers' districts) and 38 ri (villages):

- Pukch'ŏng-ŭp
- Sinbukch'ŏng-rodongjagu
- Sinch'ang-rodongjagu
- An'gong-ri
- Changhang-ri
- Chimal-li
- Chongsal-li
- Chuksang-ri
- Chung-ri
- Ch'o-ri
- Ch'ŏnghae-ri
- Ch'ŏnghŭng-ri
- Haho-ri
- Hasedong-ri
- Kŏnja-ri
- Kyŏng'andae-ri
- Manch'ul-li
- Masal-li
- Mundong-ri
- Nahadae-ri
- Nahŭng-ri
- Op'yŏng-ri
- Pansong-ri
- Poch'ŏl-li
- Pongŭi-ri
- Pudong-ri
- P'yŏng-ri
- Sangripsŏ-ri
- Sangsedong-ri
- Sinsang-ri
- Sŏri
- Tang'u-ri
- Tŏg'ŭm-ri
- Tongdo-ri
- T'osŏng-ri
- Yangch'ŏndong-ri
- Yangch'ŏnsŏ-ri
- Yangga-ri
- Yesŭng-ri
- Yongch'ŏl-li

== Economy ==
According to the North Korean state-controlled newspaper The Pyongyang Times there is a shoe factory in Pukchong County.

Also according to The Pyongyang Times a pig farm in Pukchong County was inaugurated in August 2021. The farm, whose English name is given as the Pukchong Pig Farm, is said to include an inspection room, fattening and breeding blocks, a feed processing and transportation system, as well as a means to produce organic fertilizer.

== Transportation ==
Pukch'ŏng county is served by the Tŏksŏng and P'yŏngra lines of the Korean State Railway, as well as by roads.

== See also ==
- Geography of North Korea
- Administrative divisions of North Korea
- South Hamgyong
