= Kwaksan County =

Kwaksan County 곽산군
- County

Korean transcription(s)
  - Chosŏn'gŭl: 곽산군
  - Hancha: 郭山郡
  - McCune-Reischauer: Kwaksan-gun
  - Revised Romanization: Gwaksan-gun
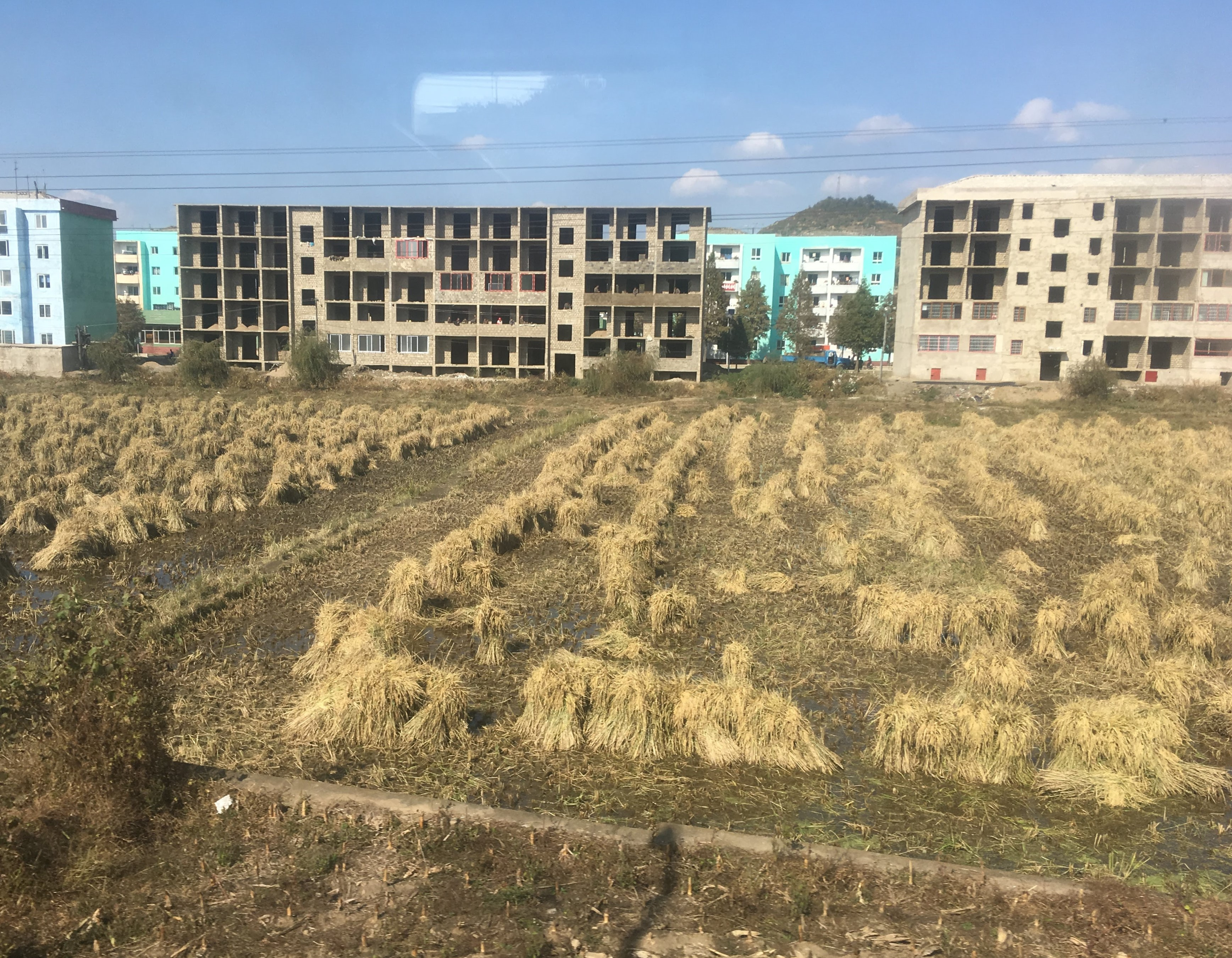
- Buildings in Kwaksan.

- Country: North Korea
- Province: North P'yŏngan
- Administrative divisions: 1 ŭp, 19 ri

Area
  - Total: 374.5 km^{2} (144.6 sq mi)

Population (2008)
  - Total: 97,660
  - Density: 260.8/km^{2} (675.4/sq mi)

Kwaksan County is a kun (Korean: 군; Hanja: 郡, 'county') in coastal southern North P'yŏngan province, North Korea. It faces the Yellow Sea to the south. By land, it is bordered by Kusŏng city to the north, Chŏngju to the east, and Sŏnch'ŏn to the west.

== Geography ==
Numerous small rivers meet the sea in Kwaksan, including the Tongrae, Sasŏng, and Sach'ŏn (사천강). There are 15 islands off the coast, which measures 67 kilometres (42 mi) in total. Forestland occupies 46.5% of the county's area, and is 80% pine; cultivated land occupies 30% of the area, and is 50% rice paddies.

== Administrative divisions ==
Kwaksan county is divided into 1 ŭp (town) and 19 ri (villages):

- Kwaksan-ŭp (곽산읍)
- Namdal-li (남단리)
- Sŏktong-ri (석동리)
- Ryŏmho-ri (렴호리)
- Roha-ri (로하리)
- Wŏnha-ri (원하리)
- Wŏnp'o-ri (원포리)
- Ch'ŏntae-ri (천대리)
- Ch'ojang-ri (초장리)
- Tonggyŏng-ri (통경리)
- Kwanjang-ri (관장리)
- Kohyŏl-li (고현리)
- Samdal-li (삼단리)
- An'ŭi-ri (안의리)
- Amjung-ri (암죽리)
- Munsang-ri (문상리)
- Kunsal-li (군산리)
- Tangsang-ri (당상리)
- Wŏr'ong-ri (월옥리)
- Changryong-ri (장룡리)

== Climate ==
The year-round average temperature is 9.2 °C (48.6 °F), with a January mean of −8.2 °C (17.2 °F) and an August average of 23.7 °C (74.7 °F). The average annual rainfall is 1,380 millimetres (54 in).

== Economy ==
The chief crops are rice, maize, apples, and peaches. Silkworms and livestock are also raised, and fishing also contributes to the local economy.

== Transportation ==
The P'yŏngŭi Line of the Korean State Railway passes through the county on its way between P'yŏngyang and Sinŭiju.

== Places of interest ==
Local attractions include a five-story stone pagoda dating from the Koryŏ period in Wŏnha-ri, and the Rŭngsan fortress (릉산성), established in 996 by the general Sŏ Hŭi.

The only institution of higher learning in the county is a technical school.

== See also ==
- Geography of North Korea
- Administrative divisions of North Korea
- North Pyongan
