= Tosan County =

T'osan County 토산군
- County

Korean transcription(s)
  - Hanja: 兎山郡
  - McCune-Reischauer: T‘osan-gun
  - Revised Romanization: Tosan-gun
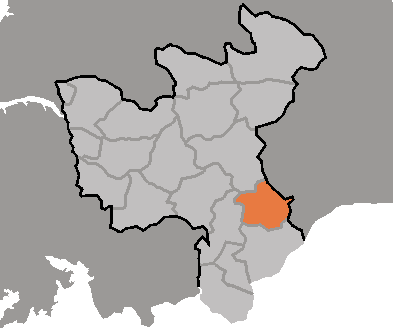
- Map of North Hwanghae showing the location of Tosan
- Country: North Korea
- Province: North Hwanghae Province

T'osan County is a county in North Hwanghae province, North Korea.

== Administrative divisions ==
T'osan county is divided into 1 ŭp (town) and 17 ri (villages):

- T'osan-ŭp
- Anbong-ri
- Hanam-ri
- Hapt'al-li
- Hwanggang-ri
- Maebong-ri
- Midang-ri
- Munsŏng-ri
- Paekhwa-ri
- Pongbul-li
- Pukp'o-ri
- Ryongam-ri
- Ryongsŏng-ri
- Sŏkpong-ri
- Songse-ri
- Songch'ŏl-li
- Suhap-ri
- Yangsa-ri
