= Yangsi Line =

1940–1945 railway line in Korea

Overview
- Native name: 양시선 (楊市線)
- Status: Merged; see text
- Owner: Tasado Railway (1940–1945); Chosen Gov't Railway (1943–1945; part); Korean State Railway (since 1945)
- Locale: North P'yŏngan
- Termini: Namsi (Yŏmju); South Sinŭiju
- Stations: 9

Service
- Type: Heavy rail, Regional rail, Freight rail

History
- Opened: 29 October 1940

Technical
- Line length: 28.7 km (17.8 mi)
- Number of tracks: Single track
- Track gauge: 1,435 mm (4 ft 8 1/2 in) standard gauge

- Yangsi Line
- Hangul: 양시선
- Hanja: 楊市線
- RR: Yangsiseon
- MR: Yangsisŏn

The Yangsi Line was a non-electrified standard-gauge railway line of the Korean State Railway in North P'yŏngan Province, North Korea, running from Namsi (Yŏmju) on the P'yŏngŭi Line to South Sinŭiju, likewise on the P'yŏngŭi Line, with which it was merged in 1964.

== History ==
The privately owned Tasado Railway opened a 39.5 km (24.5 mi) line from South Sinŭiju interlocking on the Kyŏngŭi Line of Chosen Government Railway (Sentetsu) to Tasado Port via Yangsi, called the Tasado Line, on 31 October 1939, to provide the Oji Paper Company (today the Sinuiju Chemical Fibre Complex) of Sinŭiju a means of shipping its products out via the port at Tasado, as the Yalu River freezes in winter. Then, on 29 October 1940 the Tasado Railway opened a second line, called the Yangsi Line, from Yangsi to Namsi, likewise on Sentetsu's Kyŏngŭi Line, to make a southern connection with the mainline to P'yŏngyang and Kyŏngsŏng. On 1 April 1943, Sentetsu nationalised the Sinuiju–Yangsi section of the line, both Sentetsu's new line, as well as the Tasado Railway's truncated line, kept the "Yangsi Line" name; the Tasado Line was thus shortened to its present-day condition.

After the partition of Korea the line was within the territory of the DPRK, and was nationalised by the Provisional People’s Committee for North Korea along with all other railways in the Soviet zone of occupation on 10 August 1946, to create the Korean State Railway (Kukch'ŏl); at that time, Sentetsu's and the Tasado Railway's sections of the Yangsi Line were re-merged, to return the line to its original route from South Sinŭiju to Namsi. Since the distance between South Sinŭiju and Namsi via the Yangsi Line was nearly 11 km (6.8 mi) shorter than via the original routing of the P'yŏngŭi Line via Paengma, Kukch'ŏl decided to rearrange the lines; thus, the Yangsi Line was made part of the P'yŏngŭi Line, and the original South Sinŭiju–Paengma–Yangsi section was separated to become the Paengma Line in 1964. Electrification of the former Yangsi Line was completed in the same year. Yangsi and Namsi stations were given their current names, Ryongch'ŏn and Yŏmju respectively, sometime after 1964.

== Route ==
Distance		Station name					
Total; km	S2S; km	Original Korean (Japanese)	Hunminjŏngŭm (Hanja/Kanji)	Current Korean	Chosŏn'gŭl (Hanja)	Connections	Notes
0.0	0.0	Namsi (Nanshi)	남시 (南市)	Yŏmju	염주 (鹽州)	1939–1945: Kyŏngŭi Line; Post-1945: Paengma Line	
~~4.3~~	~~4.3~~	~~Sujŏng (Suchin)~~	~~수정 (壽亭)~~	-	-		Closed 1944.
7.7	3.4	Naejung (Naichū)	내중 (內中)	Naejung	내중 (內中)		To P'yŏngŭi Line 1964
10.5	2.8	Tangnyŏng (Tōryō)	당령 (堂嶺)	Tangryŏng	당령 (堂嶺)		To P'yŏngŭi Line 1964
13.5	3.0	Yongju (Ryōshū)	용주 (龍州)	Ryongju	룡주 (龍州)		To P'yŏngŭi Line 1964
18.6	5.1	Yangsi (Yōshi)	양시 (楊市)	Ryongch'ŏn	룡천 (龍川)	1939–1943: Kyŏngŭi Line	To Sentetsu Kyŏngŭi Line 1943
21.9	3.3	Ibam (Ryūgan)	입암 (立巖)	Ribam	리암 (立巖)		To Sentetsu Kyŏngŭi Line 1943
25.7	3.8	Nagwŏn (Rakugen)	낙원 (樂元)	Ragwŏn	락원 (樂元)		To Sentetsu Kyŏngŭi Line in 1943.
28.7	3.0	Namsinŭiju (Minami-Shingishū)	남신의주 (南新義州)	Namsinŭiju (South Sinŭiju)	남신의주 (南新義州)	1939–1943: Kyŏngŭi Line; Post-1964: Paengma Line	
