= Pihyon County =

Phihyŏn County 피현군
- County

Korean transcription(s)
  - Chosŏn'gŭl: 피현군
  - Hancha: 枇峴郡
  - McCune-Reischauer: P'ihyŏn-gun
  - Revised Romanization: Pihyeon-gun
- Country: North Korea
- Province: North P'yŏngan
- Administrative divisions: 1 ŭp, 2 workers' districts, 21 ri

Area
  - Total: 439 km^{2} (169 sq mi)

Population (2008)
  - Total: 110,637
  - Density: 252/km^{2} (653/sq mi)

Phihyŏn is a kun, or county, in northwestern North P'yŏngan province, North Korea. It is bounded to the north by Ŭiju, to the east by Chŏnma, to the south by Yŏmju and Tongrim, and to the west by Ryongchŏn and the large city of Sinŭiju. It was established as a separate county in 1952, and was subsequently reorganized in 1954, 1958, 1961, 1963, 1967 and 1978.

== Geography ==
The land of Phihyŏn is generally flat in the west, rolling in the center, and rises to the low Munsu Mountains in the east. The chief of these peaks is Munsusan (문수산, 736 m). The chief local stream is the Samgyochŏn (삼교천), a tributary of the Yalu River. Forestland covers 57% of the county's area (of that, pine forests account for 80%); 31% of the county is cultivated.

== Administrative divisions ==
Phihyŏn is divided into 1 ŭp (town), 2 rodongjagu (workers' districts) and 21 ri (villages):

- Phihyŏn-ŭp (피현읍/被峴邑)
- Paengma-rodongjagu (백마로동자구/白馬勞動者區)
- Ryangchaek-rodongjagu (량책로동자구/良策勞動者區)
- Jŏngsan-ri (정산리/亭山里)
- Chubong-ri (추봉리/趨峰里)
- Chungryŏl-ri (충렬리/忠烈里)
- Hadan-ri (하단리/下端里)
- Hwasam-ri (화삼리/化三里)
- Kwang-ri (광리/廣里)
- Nonggŏn-ri (농건리/農建里)
- Puksam-ri (북삼리/北三里)
- Rojung-ri (로중리/蘆中里)
- Ryonggye-ri (룡계리/龍溪里)
- Ryonghŭng-ri (룡흥리/龍興里)
- Ryongun-ri (룡운리/龍雲里)
- Ryongyu-ri (룡유리/龍遊里)
- Samsang-ri (삼상리/三上里)
- Sanggo-ri (상고리/上古里)
- Sŏngdong-ri (성동리/城東里)
- Songjŏng-ri (송정리/松亭里)
- Taephyŏng-ri (대평리/臺坪里)
- Tanghu-ri (당후리/堂後里)
- Tongsang-ri (동상리/東上里)
- Tongsŏ-ri (동서리/東西里)

== Climate ==
The year-round average temperature is 8.5 °C, dipping to a January mean of -9.5 °C and rising to 23.6 °C in August. The annual rainfall averages 1065 mm.

== Economy ==
Crops raised on that cultivated land include rice, maize, soybeans, and sweet potatoes. Peanuts are also raised; Phihyon ranks second in the province in peanut production, and third in sheep production. The county is known for its hogs.

Phihyŏn is home to the Phihyŏn College of Land Administration.

== Transportation ==
The Phyŏngŭi (Pyŏngyang-Sinŭiju) and Paengma (Yŏmju-South Sinŭiju) lines of the Korean State Railway pass through the county.

== See also ==
- Geography of North Korea
- Administrative divisions of North Korea
- North Pyongan
