= Yongchon =

Yongchon may refer to several places in Korea. Because of North–South differences and various systems for the romanization of Korean, each of these place names has several possible English spellings.

- Yeongcheon (영천시), also romanized as Yŏngch'ŏn, is a city in North Gyeongsang Province, South Korea
- Ryongchon County (룡천군), also romanized as Ryongch'ŏn-kun, is a county in North Pyongan Province, North Korea. The initial r is present in North Korean (but not South Korean) pronunciation and spelling.
- Ryongch'ŏn-ri (룡천리) is a ri on the Ongjin Peninsula in Ongjin County, South Hwanghae, North Korea. The initial r is present in North Korean (but not South Korean) pronunciation and spelling.
