= Naejung station =

Railway station in North Korea

Coordinates: 39.9165°N 124.5373°E

Naejung 내중

Korean name
- Hangul: 내중역
- Hanja: 内中驛
- Revised Romanization: Naejung-yeok
- McCune–Reischauer: Naejung-yŏk

General information
- Location: Naejung-ri, Yŏmju County, North P'yŏngan Province; North Korea
- Owner: Korean State Railway

Services
Preceding station	Korean State Railway	Following station
Ryongju towards Dandong (China)	P'yŏngŭi Line	Yŏmju towards P'yŏngyang
Location

Naejung station is a railway station in Naejung-ri, Yŏmju County, North P'yŏngan Province, North Korea. It is on located on the P'yŏngŭi Line of the Korean State Railway.
