= Battle of Ongjin Peninsula =

1950 battle during the Korean War

Coordinates: 37.949°N 125.409°E

- Part of the Korean War; Operation Pokpung (North Korea); Operation Western Region (South Korea)
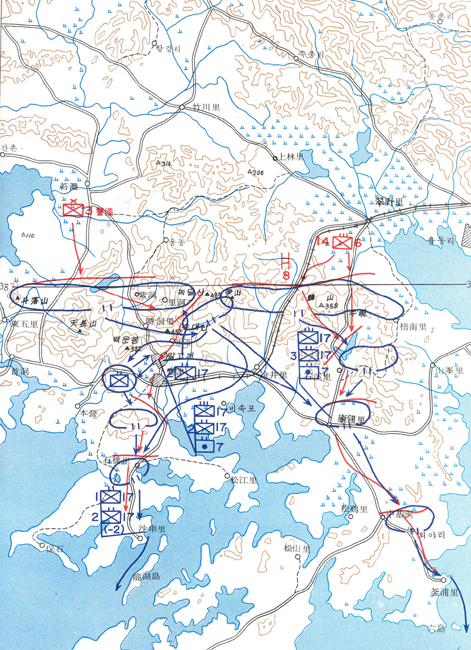
- Old tactical map of the Battle of Ongjin Peninsula with an error in the KPA unit.
Date	25–26 June 1950
Location	Ongjin Peninsula
Result	KPA victory Successful ROK withdrawal
Territorial changes	KPA captured Ongjin and Kangryong

Belligerents
Democratic People's Republic of Korea	Republic of Korea

Commanders and leaders
Choe Hyon; Kim Hu-chin	Paik In-yup

Strength
3rd 38-Guard Brigade (-3 battalions); 1st Infantry Regiment	17th Infantry Regiment

Casualties and losses
South Korean claim: 581 dead 5 SU-76Ms; 5 armored vehicles	7th Infantry Regiment: 113 dead; 371 wounded; 64 missing; Total: 326 dead including attached units and police

The Battle of Ongjin Peninsula (Korean: 옹진반도 전투; Hanja: 甕津半島 戰鬪) was a series of battles that occurred in Ongjin Peninsula between 25 and 26 June 1950 and was a part of the Operation Pokpung (North Korea) and Operation Western Region (South Korea) that marked the beginning of the Korean War. On 25 June, the Korean People's Army (KPA) 3rd 38-Guard Brigade, reinforced with the 1st Infantry Regiment of the 6th Infantry Division, launched a surprise attack on the Republic of Korea Army (ROKA) 17th Infantry Regiment in Ongjin Peninsula, modern-day Ongjin and Kangryong. The battle ended on 26 June with a KPA victory, but many ROKA troops were able to escape from the peninsula.

== Prelude ==
Ongjin Peninsula lies at the westernmost point of the 38th parallel. It is surrounded by the sea and can only be accessed by land through North Korean territory. Pupo, located at the southernmost point of the peninsula, was the only major supply line for the ROKA. To ensure a safe evacuation, securing Pupo was of utmost importance. The distance between Pupo and Incheon is 90 km by sea, and, at the time, it took 9 hours for a ferry to travel one way.

There are strategic mountains at the centre of the peninsula that can be used to observe the entire peninsula and be used for military encampments. Prior to the battle, the two opposing forces had already had three clashes near these mountains in 1949.

=== North Korea ===
Between 10 and 23 June 1950, the KPA completed its deployment for full-scale war in the western region under the guise of military training. The KPA 3rd 38-Guard Brigade moved its seven battalions near Ongjin Peninsula and Yeonbaek (now Yonan) district. Meanwhile, the 1st Infantry Regiment and a Security Battalion located in Sariwon were separated from the 6th Infantry Division and moved to Chwiya to reinforce the 3rd Brigade. Their mission was to capture the entire Ongjin Peninsula and Yonan Peninsula while the higher command, I Corps, headed for Seoul.

To achieve the goal, the 3rd 38-Guard Brigade originally planned a full-out parallel attack with seven battalions and a regiment, keeping the 7th 38-Guard Battalion as a reserve unit. However, Brigadier General Choe Hyon, the commander of the 3rd Brigade, adjusted the plan right before the war instead of operating each unit independently to prevent the manpower on the frontline from getting too thin. The 1st Infantry Regiment was assigned to advance to Kangryong and split the ROK 17th Infantry Regiment in half.

The KPA troop strength in the region was 11,000, including 8,000 from the 3rd 38-Guard Brigade and 3,000 from attached units. They were armed with four M-30 howitzers, five SU-76M self-propelled guns, 32 ZiS-3 guns, 45 M-42 anti-tank guns, ninety-five 82-PM-41 mortars, sixteen 120-PM-43 mortars, and eight armoured vehicles.

Korean People's Army Ground Force

- 3rd 38-Guard Brigade - Brigadier General Choe Hyon
  - (Ongjin Peninsula direction) - participants of the Battle of Ongjin Peninsula
    - 2nd 38-Guard Battalion - (north of Ongjin)
    - 4th 38-Guard Battalion - (north of Ongjin)
    - 5th 38-Guard Battalion - (northwest of Ongjin)
    - 6th 38-Guard Battalion - (northwest of Ongjin)
    - 7th 38-Guard Battalion - (reserve)
    - 1st Infantry Regiment (attached) - Colonel Kim Hu-chin (northeast of Ongjin)
  - (Yonan Peninsula direction) - non-participant
    - 1st 38-Guard Battalion - (north of Paechon)
    - 3rd 38-Guard Battalion - (north of Yonan)
    - (1) Security Battalion (attached) - (north of Chongdan)

=== South Korea ===
The ROK 17th Infantry Regiment was tasked to defend a 45 km long border, which exceeded its capability by far—a division was normally tasked to cover 10 km. In addition, many higher mountains were located above the 38th parallel, creating a huge geographic disadvantage. Understanding the situation, the regiment commander Colonel Paik In-yup mobilised civilians to fortify bases on mountains below the 38th parallel, which were the only and the last major resistance line. Five civilians were killed by North Korean fire during the construction. The colonel also created a paramilitary force by combining several youth clubs to protect their hometowns.

The ROKA Headquarters had three defensive plans. The first was to hold the 38th parallel if the fighting was small-scale. The second was to hold the main resistance line until reinforcement arrived, if the battle was limited to the region. Lastly, if North Korea launched a full-scale war, then the regiment would retreat to Incheon from the port of Pupo while forcing the KPA to bleed as much as possible. The regiment and civilians conducted evacuation training for plans 1 and 2, but not plan 3. The military prioritised the families of military and civil servants, then allowed civilians as ship capacity allowed.

One month before the war, KPA artillery staff operations officer Major Kang Chang-nam and his liaison from the 3rd 38-Guard Brigade defected to the ROK 17th Regiment and provided information about the KPA battle orders, locations, and training status.

Paik ordered the adjustment of battalion positions to focus on the sector defended by the 3rd Infantry Battalion, which includes the road connecting Chwiya and Kangryong, to prevent the KPA from splitting the regiment. Moreover, he requested additional troops as recent North Korean activity indicated an additional KPA unit in the area.

On 20 June, many KPA vehicles and high-ranking officers were sighted on the frontline. On the night of 22 June, a line of vehicles was seen moving from Haeju to Chwiya with the headlights off. Despite these reports, at 24:00 on 23 June, the Army Headquarters lifted the special alert order that had been issued at the end of May, and allowed soldiers to take vacation or go out from the bases. Paik disobeyed the order. The next day, five United Nations observers visited the regiment and complained that the regiment was "creating tensions" and there was "no reason for a special alert", then went back to Seoul. As a result, Paik had to inevitably lift the emergency measures, except for the frontline troops, which ultimately weakened the defence line.

The 3rd Infantry Battalion guarded the regiment's right from the coast to Mt Noktal, and the 1st Infantry Battalion was protecting the left from Mt Noktal to Mt Turak. The 2nd Infantry Battalion acted as a reserve unit, mostly doing basic and tactical training near the regimental command at Ongjin Mine, located north of Ongjin.

The ROKA total troop strength in Ongjin Peninsula was 3,600, including 2,719 from the 7th Infantry Regiment, 526 from the 7th Artillery Battalion, 129 from the anti-tank company, and other supporting units. They were armed with 12 M3 howitzers, six M1 anti-tank guns, 12 M1 mortars, 18 M2 mortars, 60 M9A1 rocket launchers and 25 machine guns.

Republic of Korea Army

- 17th Infantry Regiment - Colonel Paik In-yup (HQ in Ongjin Mine)
  - 1st Infantry Battalion - Major Kim Hui-tae (regiment left, HQ in Mahyon)
    - 1st Company - Captain Gang Eun-deok (battalion reserve, HQ in Mahyon)
    - 2nd Company - 1st Lieutenant Han Hyeok (Battalion left, HQ in Undong)
    - 3rd Company - (Battalion right, HQ on Hill 429)
    - 4th Company - 1st Lieutenant Son Chang-sul (weapon company)
  - 2nd Infantry Battalion - Major Song Ho-rim (regiment reserve, HQ in Ongjin Mine)
    - 5th Company - 1st Lieutenant Kim Gyo-seok
    - 6th Company
    - 7th Company
    - 8th Company - (weapon company)
  - 3rd Infantry Battalion - Major Oh Ik-gyeong (regiment right, HQ in Kangryong)
    - 9th Company - 1st Lieutenant Han Hong (battalion centre, HQ on Mount Chak)
    - 10th Company - Captain An Je-hui (battalion left, HQ on Mount Noktal)
    - 11th Company - 1st Lieutenant Kim Jong-yun (battalion right, HQ in Uhyon)
    - 12th Company - Captain Jeong Gyu-han (weapon company)
  - 7th Artillery Battalion (attached) - Major Bak Jeong-ho
    - 1st Battery - (attached to the regiment HQ)
    - 2nd Battery - 1st Lieutenant Seo Jeong-seon (attached to the 3rd Battalion in Todong)
    - 3rd Battery - 1st Lieutenant Kim Won-gil (attached to the 1st Battalion in Donggokdong)
  - Anti-tank gun Company (attached) - Captain Noh Gyeong-eok (3 platoon, each platoon attached to the 1st & the 3rd Battalion and the regiment HQ)
  - (1) engineer company (attached) - 1st Lieutenant Bak Jun-hui (attached to the regiment HQ)

== Timeline ==
On 25 June at 04:00, the KPA fired red and green flares and fired artillery on the ROK defences for 30 minutes. At 04:40, Major Kim Hui-tae, the commander of the ROK 1st Battalion, was informed that an enemy platoon was approaching through a blind spot by the 3rd Company. Kim decided to take care of the situation himself and headed towards Chadong (1.5 km north of Mahyon), in the vicinity of the 3rd Company HQ.

At 05:00, the ROK 7th Artillery Battalion received authorisation from American officer Major Frank Brown, who was part of the Korean Military Advisory Group (KMAG), to fire their M3 howitzers. However, the authorisation was given much later than requested due to KMAG's control over large-calibre weapons, which was aimed at preventing a preemptive strike by South Korea on North Korea and avoiding any escalation of the war involving the Soviet Union.

During the same period, the ROK 1st Platoon, 2nd Company lost its position to a KPA battalion. When Kim arrived at Chadong, he found that the 3rd Company HQ bunker had already been destroyed, and gun battles were taking place all around. He was also informed that the leader of the 2nd Platoon, 3rd Company 2nd Lieutenant Kim Ho-kyeong, had died. At 05:10, the ROK 1st Battalion lost communications with the 2nd and the 3rd Company.

At 05:30, Kim returned to Mahyon and ordered the battalion reserve, the 1st Company, to prepare to reinforce Chadong. He also requested assistance from the regiment HQ with the 2nd Battalion. At 05:40, KPA troops attacked the ROK 2nd Platoon, 2nd Company, but the platoon was able to repel the attack. However, the platoon noticed a North Korean flag being waved on Mount Turak, where the 3rd Platoon was located. A KPA battalion, led by cavalry, was also seen marching on the road to Ongjin without any opposition. The 2nd Platoon later joined the 2nd Battalion during the counterattack.

At 05:30, KPA artillery fire destroyed the ROK 3rd Battalion's observation post and communication systems. As a result, the battalion had to rely on the SCR-300 operated by the 9th Company. This caused confusion and limited command and control between units. Despite the situation, the ROK 3rd Battalion continued to fight against the KPA 1st Infantry Regiment in the fog along the 38th parallel. To help the situation, Paik sent an operations officer to the 3rd Battalion to hold positions and recover communications.

At the ROK 17th Infantry Regiment HQ, Paik was initially hesitant to send reinforcements to the 1st Battalion. He expected the main KPA offensive to come from the eastern front, and felt that the situation of the 3rd Battalion was more critical. However, he changed his mind after receiving a report at 06:10 about the death of Kim due to an 82-PM-41 mortar attack. Moreover, the defence of the 2nd Company, 1st Battalion started to crumble under the concentrated KPA fire, and the 3rd Company also suffered losses, including their commanding officer, and allowed the KPA to break through the defence line. As a result, Paik ordered the 2nd Battalion (excluding the 6th Company) to reinforce the 1st Battalion, and they moved out at 06:40.

The ROK 2nd Battalion hurried to Mahyon (4 km north of Ongjin), where the 1st Battalion HQ was located. Upon arrival, they found a 38-Guard Battalion causing chaos in the empty compound by setting fire to everything. At 07:00, the 2nd battalion joined forces with units of the 4th Company and the 3rd Battery. The battalion commander, Major Song Ho-rim, ordered the battalion to encircle the KPA by positioning the 5th Company on the right and the 7th Company on the left. They fired shots from 17 heavy guns, including 10 M1 mortars, two M1 anti-tank guns, and five M3 howitzers. The attack caused panic among the KPA, and the ROKA took control of the situation.

However, at 09:00, Paik ordered the 2nd Battalion to redirect a company to assist the 3rd Battalion due to the critical situation at the regiment's right defence. Song did not want to reduce the manpower and lose the momentum of the counterattack, so he sent a mortar platoon of the 8th Company and the 3rd Battery to join with the 6th Company, which was the last reserve of the regiment, to help the 3rd Battalion.

At dawn, soldiers and vehicles from the KPA 1st Infantry Regiment began advancing from Chwiya and moving towards Kangryong and Yangwon on the road, using the morning haze as cover. Once the haze cleared, the ROK 3rd Battalion realised that the KPA had already advanced 2 km south of the 38th parallel, equipped with SU-76Ms, armoured vehicles, and M-42 anti-tank guns. The KPA's guns began firing, forcing the ROKA to abandon their positions and retreat to the south. At 08:00, the ROK 3rd Battalion CO, Major Oh Ik-gyeong, met with 1st Lieutenant Jo, the operations officer whom Paik had sent earlier, and sent Jo back to the regiment HQ to request reinforcement. To halt the KPA's advance, Oh set up defences on high grounds and mountains near the roads north of Kangryong that the KPA would march through, and instructed his men to prioritise targeting the armoured vehicles.

Meanwhile, the ROK 1st Company, 1st Battalion, led by Captain Gang Eun-deok, arrived and operated at Chadong since 07:30. However, as the haze disappeared on the battlefield, they discovered that they were surrounded by the KPA. The company was pinned down and fought for two hours until the ROK 5th Company arrived to rescue them. The 1st Company then joined the counterattack under the command of Song. At 10:00, Song received a gunshot wound to his left ear that barely missed his left face. Paik reported the urgency of the situation to the Army HQ and requested assistance. However, the HQ instructed Paik to "defeat the enemy and withdraw through the land". At 10:35, two L-5s carrying five members of the KMAG arrived in Ongjin, and the pilots, Major Lloyd Swink and 1st Lieutenant Brown, informed Paik about the full-scale invasion by the KPA across the border.

At 10:40, the ROK 10th Company, 3rd Battalion at the west ridge of Mount Chima engaged with the KPA 1st Regiment. Although they managed to destroy one armoured vehicle, they were forced to retreat due to the KPA's superior firepower. At 11:00, the ROK 9th Company stationed at Hill 200 ambushed the 1st Regiment. During the attack, the ROKA killed several KPA soldiers and also damaged one SU-76M while destroying two armoured vehicles with the help of six M9A1 rocket launchers. However, the ROKA also suffered many losses and eventually retreated to Kangryong.

At 11:00, Paik gave an order to relocate the regiment HQ to Kangryong and evacuate civilians. He also instructed that confidential documents, supplies, and facilities be destroyed due to the absence of any potential help. The streets were congested with wounded soldiers and evacuees, and the field hospital was struggling to manage. Paik arranged for five 2.5-ton trucks to transport the wounded, giving priority to soldiers with severe injuries. However, only the first round of transport was able to leave for Kangryong since the KPA zone of control had expanded. The other group of wounded soldiers had to make their own way out. At 14:00, 1st Lieutenant Seon U and 10 ROKs, who were tasked with cleaning up the facilities, escaped from the HQ with five 2.5-ton trucks fully loaded with 105 mm ammunition. They drove to Sagot (13 km south of Ongjin) and then landed at Pupo at 21:00 via a civilian boat carrying refugees.

At 11:30, the ROK 11th Company began to retreat after being attacked by KPA SU-76Ms.

At 14:00, the KPA 1st Regiment successfully broke through the defence line of the ROK 3rd Battalion and started advancing towards Kangryong. Paik decided to relocate the regimental HQ to Pupo because Kangryong was not an ideal location for defence. It was situated on a plain that would leave the ROK exposed to KPA attacks. Consequently, he ordered all ROKA in the Kangryong sector, except for four M1 anti-tank guns and their gunners and assistant gunners, to establish a defence line between Chunggidong and Chukkyori (8 km southeast of Kangryong). Paik also ordered the 1st and the 2nd Battalion to retreat, and sent anti-tank teams to set up the guns on the east side of the river that flows through the town.

At the time the order for retreat was given to the ROK 2nd Battalion, the 5th Company had already advanced to Chadong, and the 7th Company had reached Sadong. Song was angered by the order, as his battalion was winning and his soldiers were highly motivated. However, at 14:30, after assessing the situation, Song issued retreat orders to every unit under the 1st and the 2nd Battalion and instructed the 5th Company to create a path for withdrawal. The 5th Company successfully reached Mahyon by 15:00, where company leader Kim appointed a senior officer as the commanding officer before separating from the company with the 2nd Platoon leader and 18 others on a 2.5-ton truck. Upon reaching the field hospital, a civilian attempted to stop the truck but was disregarded. The truck was ambushed by the KPA, who killed five ROKAs, including Kim, although 15 ROKAs survived. After the attack, the survivors fled to Yeonpyeong Island on a fishing boat. The remaining platoons of the 5th Company later joined the 3rd Battalion at Chunggidong by moving along the coastline at 20:00. On the 25th the 5th Company reported 300 KPA casualties, as well as 20 KIA, including the company CO and the 3rd Platoon leader 1st Lieutenant Lee Chun-man, and 30 WIA.

During the retreat, the 7th Company was assigned to guard the rear while other units of the 1st and the 2nd Battalion retreated. The 7th Company assigned the 1st Platoon to act as a rearguard and began to pull out their units one at a time in the following order: the 8th Company, the machine gun platoon, the weapons platoon, the 2nd Platoon, the 3rd Platoon, and finally the 1st Platoon. However, the KPA attacked during the withdrawal of the 3rd Platoon, resulting in the loss of their leader and platoon sergeant. Two platoons were separated from the company and had to make their way to the rally point at Naengjongri before moving on to Sagot.

Initially, Song attempted to withdraw to Gangryong by breaking through KPA-occupied Yangwon, which was guarded by four SU-76Ms. At around 15:00, his troops went back to Mahyon after failing to destroy self-propelled guns with the M1 mortars. However, on their way back, they encountered KPA gunfire that almost killed the major. Therefore, he decided to go to Naengjongri and started reorganising the troops gathered there, which were around 400 in number.

While the ROK forces in the western sector were regrouping, a group of four KPA SU-76Ms was heading towards Gangryong. However, the KPA column halted at the entrance of Gangryong to take extra caution due to previous ROKA ambushes with anti-tank weapons. This decision gave an advantage to the ROKA as the SU-76Ms became stationary and exposed side armour to the line of sight of the anti-tank guns commanded by Paik (most of the ROK munitions for the M1 anti-tank gun were high-explosives). The ROKA destroyed three SU-76Ms and two armoured vehicles, and escaping KPA crews were then targeted by a .50 Cal machine gun mounted on Paik's ¾-ton vehicle. After that, the ROK anti-tank team then withdrew to Chunggidong safely. At 16:00, Paik started giving out detailed plans.

Despite Paik's attempts to contact the 2nd Battalion to order a withdrawal to Sagot, there was no response from the radio transceiver. Meanwhile, Song and his foot soldiers were moving around Ongjin city, as KPA activity had been reported in the area. Part of his force consisted of a convoy of seven 2.5-ton trucks carrying combat troops (5), wounded (1) and ammunition (1). They drove through the city streets at high speed, firing at the KPA in the process. The convoy continued south and dismounted troops to secure the three-way interaction next to Mount Yongun (3 km south of Ongjin) to provide cover for the retreating ROK to Sagot.

At 18:00, Song was informed about the rescue plan and received instructions from Paik. By 19:30, approximately 700 ROKs had assembled near Mount Yongun, including the 1st and 3rd platoon of the 7th Company. Song assigned the 7th Company and a weapon platoon of the 4th Company to the mount as the first rearguard and stationed the 1st Company at Yangmyongdong (2 km north of Sagot) as the second rearguard to provide cover for the first. Then, Song and the rest of the troops moved to Sagot.

In the eastern sector, several ROK units that had been scattered, including the 5th Company, around 100 soldiers from the 3rd Battalion, and the engineer company, made their way to the regiment at Pupo and joined them. In anticipation of a potential KPA attack that could lead to the collapse of his force, Paik decided to use deception. He ordered Oh and Bak to fire every howitzer and mortar until sunrise. He then instructed the transportation officer to use all 85 vehicles to continuously do roundtrips from Pupo to Chunggidong. Additionally, the officer was instructed to turn off the headlights during the return trips, which would make the KPA believe that the ROK was receiving reinforcements from the mainland. The deception worked, and the KPA did not launch any attacks until the next morning.

Sagot was filled with soldiers, policemen, and refugees in chaos. Upon arrival, Song fired a pistol in the air in an attempt to control the crowd and threatened the disobedient with execution. However, there were no ships available at the port. At 23:00, a senior inspector reported to the major that police on Yongho Island were unable to send their boat due to an ongoing mission. Song contacted the police station and redirected the mission to evacuate 1,300 ROKs and 700 policemen and civilians at Sagot. Therefore, the police chief sent out Daeseong to transport 80 people per round trip to Yongho Island. The ROK set fire to all of their 15 vehicles before leaving.

At 23:30, the Republic of Korea Navy (ROKN) ship LST-801 docked at Pupo. Navy Captain Kim Ok-kyeong informed Paik that due to the tide, the ship must depart before 08:00. Paik promptly left Pupo for the front line.

On 26 June at 00:30, Paik summoned Oh and Bak to withdraw one company at a time using vehicles with their headlights off. The withdrawal began at 01:00, and by 05:00, only the 11th Company, a battery, and an anti-tank gun company remained at the defence line when the KPA reopened artillery fire.

The 11th Company stopped using vehicles and retreated on foot under the covering fire from anti-tank guns and howitzers. However, two KPA SU-76Ms ignored incoming ROKA fire and advanced to Chochon, stopping at a bridge that had been destroyed by ROK engineers earlier. The KPA mobilised civilians to repair the bridge, and the KPA continued their advance three hours later. The ROKA used this as an opportunity to pull out their last remaining troops and hid two anti-tank guns near the road entering Pupo. The 11th Company made a separate escape via fishing boats.

At 07:00 in Sagot, the ROK 1st Company boarded Daeseong after transporting other ROKs and policemen. However, due to increasing KPA shelling, the ROK had to leave 500 refugees behind in Sagot. Another 100 ROKs landed on Yongho Island by different boats. The ROKAs on the island were provided with food for the first time since the war started. At 9:00, the supply officer, 1st Lieutenant Bak Won-keun, sailed out on Daeseong in an attempt to find more ships.

At 09:30, two KPA SU-76Ms were destroyed near Pupo by anti-tank guns commanded by Paik. When Paik returned to Pupo, most ROKs escaped from the area, and only around 100 ROKs were waiting for their regiment commander to return. From 05:00, the LST-801 departed Pupo to avoid getting stranded and was joined by a training ship operated by the maritime university. The LST-801 continued evacuating ROK with four landing crafts and fishing boats. Paik sent an information officer, Captain Yu Chang-hun, to direct the training ship to rescue the 1st and 2nd Battalions in Sagot.

At 10:30, the KPA started shelling Pupo, and Paik and Bak returned fire with the last M3 howitzer waiting to be disassembled to provide cover. At 11:00, Paik ordered the last remaining ship to leave without him and continuously fired the howitzer until the ship was far enough from the danger zone. They disassembled and dumped the howitzer in the ocean, and then Paik attempted to commit suicide using his pistol, but was stopped by Bak. They left Pupo on a small boat that Bak found and were picked up by a fishing boat after drifting on the ocean without any means of propulsion for a few hours.

At 14:00, the ROKN training ship arrived near Sagot, and there were no signs of the ROKA but only the KPA cavalry patrolling the area. The ship then changed course to Incheon.

At 15:00, the ROKA led by Song on Yongho Island departed for Pupo on four ships that Daeseong brought to the island. They arrived near Pupo after four hours, but changed course after learning about the KPA occupation of Pupo from 3rd Battalion troops whom the ship picked up.

More ROKAs, either individually or as a group, made their escape. The last known ROKA group to depart Ongjin Peninsula was at 15:30 from Pupo.

At 16:00, LST-801 carrying 1,200 ROKA passengers set course for Incheon after waiting for the regiment commander. They were commanded by Lieutenant Colonel Kim Hui-jun during the absence of Paik and landed in Incheon at 04:00 on 27 June. Upon landing, attached troops were ordered to return to their original units, and the remaining 700 ROKAs of the 17th Regiment went to a new rally point at Yeongdeungpo.

At 19:00, Paik arrived at Yeongpyeong Island and worked on the defences of the island with local guards. After a few hours, the ROKN ships JMS-302 and JMS-307 arrived and rescued the colonel and 41 ROKs. They left the island at 02:00 on 27 June, and landed at Incheon at 08:00. Paik reported the situation to the chief of staff of the army Chae Byong-duk and the Ministry of defence Shin Song-mo at the Army HQ, and was given a new mission to provide security for the government's relocation to Daejeon.

The ROKA convoy led by Song arrived at Yeonpyeong Island at 07:00 on 27 June. They left the island at 20:00 in three groups, and the first and second groups docked at the Port of Incheon at 06:00 on 28 June. They waited for the third group until 20:00 and boarded the ROKN ship YMS-513 and landed at Gunsan at 07:00 on 29 June to join the regiment by train. The third group landed at Incheon at 11:00 and arrived at Daejeon on 30 June with help from the police.

== Aftermath ==
=== ROK assessment ===
The ROK 17th Infantry Regiment mobilised residents before the war to fortify defensive positions and organised local organisations into local defence units to cooperate with the military. Together with Paik's decision to stay alert, the ROKA was able to minimise casualties during the beginning of the KPA invasion. The regiment operated two battalions at the frontline and one battalion as a reserve. Battalions were rotated every two months, and the 2nd Battalion was undergoing intensive training on both small and heavy firearms, which allowed the battalion to succeed during the ROK counterattack.

The regiment was not large enough to cover the entire front line. The ROK Army HQ also did not send any reinforcement despite hearing reports from the regiment, including that from the defected KPA officer. The regiment was unable to actively send out patrols due to a shortage of troops, thus allowing the KPA to break through the defence line without getting spotted. Watch towers and communication systems were prioritised by the KPA and were destroyed at an early stage of the battle. The ROKA moved artillery to the front and provided fire support in close range, repelling KPA attacks and causing many KPA casualties. However, the ROKA frequently experienced shortages of ammunition, mostly due to communication problems between units and logistics. Lack of communication also disrupted cooperation between the units, and in particular, during withdrawal, caused a lot of losses. In addition, many lives and equipment were lost due to the delay in support from the Army HQ.

Paik did not anticipate a full-scale invasion of the KPA, but he preserved the 17th Regiment against a superior force. However, Paik made a crucial error in using the reserve battalion by assisting the ROK left defence too early, thus letting the KPA 1st Infantry Regiment crush the ROKA right defence quickly and split the ROKA in half by advancing to Kangryong.

=== Propaganda issues ===
On 25 June, Choe Gi-deok, a reporter from Yonhap News Agency (not to be confused with the current Yonhap News Agency), returned from Ongjin Peninsula and told Colonel Kim Hyeon-su, the director of the Ministry of defence media agency, that Paik said he "will advance to Haeju", and it was mistakenly translated to "advancing to Haeju" during the broadcast. According to Paik, he never said such a thing. On the other hand, reporter Choe had a record of arrest for sympathising with and promoting communism and disrupting public order. Choe later claimed that he disputed with Kim over the detail, but the colonel left as it was to keep the ROK morale high. Regardless of the credibility, public media started producing fake news about ROKA victories, including the "capture of Haeju" between 27 and 28 June. However, propaganda confused commanders of the ROKA to plan out tactics correctly, damaging the military rather than helping. In addition, these false reports were used to fortify North Korea's claim on South Korea's artillery attacks between 23 and 25 June, which never happened, and South Korea's responsibility for starting the war.
