= Ryongju station =

Railway station in Ryongchon, North Korea

Coordinates: 39.9496°N 124.4887°E

Ryongju 룡주

Korean name
- Hangul: 룡주역
- Hanja: 龍州驛
- Revised Romanization: Yongju-yeok
- McCune–Reischauer: Ryongju-yŏk

General information
- Location: Inhŭng-ri, Ryongch'ŏn County, North P'yŏngan Province; North Korea
- Owner: Korean State Railway

Services
Preceding station	Korean State Railway	Following station
Ryongch'ŏn towards Dandong (China)	P'yŏngŭi Line	Naejung towards P'yŏngyang
Location

Ryongju station is a railway station in Inhŭng-ri, Ryongch'ŏn County, North P'yŏngan Province, North Korea. It is on located on the P'yŏngŭi Line of the Korean State Railway.
