= Tongrim County =

Tongrim County 동림군
- County

Korean transcription(s)
  - Chosŏn'gŭl: 동림군
  - Hancha: 東林郡
  - McCune-Reischauer: Tongrim-kun
  - Revised Romanization: Dongrim-gun
- Country: North Korea
- Province: North P'yŏngan
- Administrative divisions: 1 ŭp, 2 workers' districts, 20 ri

Area
  - Total: 415.3 km^{2} (160.3 sq mi)

Population (2008)
  - Total: 104,614

Tongrim County is a kun, or county, in coastal southwestern North P'yŏngan province, North Korea. It borders P'ihyŏn and Ch'ŏnma to the north, Sŏnch'ŏn to the east, Ch'ŏlsan to the southwest and Yŏmju to the west. To the south, it looks out on the Yellow Sea.

== Geography ==
The landscape is dominated by low, rolling hills and basins, rising to its highest point, Munsusan, at 736 metres (2,415 ft) on the northern border. Tongrim is drained by the Ch'ŏngch'ŏn River and its tributaries, including the Maryŏng River and the Kokch'ŏn stream. Some 60% of the county is covered by forestland; only 26% of the area is cultivated.

== Administrative divisions ==
Tongrim county is divided into 1 ŭp (town), 2 rodongjagu (workers' districts) and 20 ri (villages):

- Tongrim-ŭp (동림읍/東林邑)
- Obong-rodongjagu (오봉로동자구/梧峰勞動者區)
- Singong-rodongjagu (신곡로동자구/新谷勞動者區)
- Ansal-li (안산리/雁山里)
- Changbong-ri (잠봉리/蠶峰里)
- Ch'ŏnggang-ri (청강리/淸江里)
- Ch'ŏngsong-ri (청송리/靑松里)
- Indo-ri (인두리/仁豆里)
- Inp'ung-ri (인풍리/仁豊里)
- Kogon'yŏng-ri (고군영리/古軍營里)
- Masŏng-ri (마성리/磨星里)
- Namsal-li (남삼리/南三里)
- Posŏng-ri (보성리/保聖里)
- Puhwang-ri (부황리/付皇里)
- P'ungch'ŏl-li (풍천리/豊川里)
- Ryongsal-li (룡산리/龍山里)
- Ryong'yŏl-li (룡연리/龍淵里)
- Samsŏng-ri (삼성리/三成里)
- Sangsu-ri (상수리/上水里)
- Sansŏng-ri (산성리/山城里)
- Ŭnbong-ri (은봉리/殷峰里)
- Wŏl'al-li (월안리/月安里)
- Wŏlgong-ri (월곡리/月谷里)

== Climate ==
The year-round average temperature is 8.8 degrees Celsius (50 degrees Fahrenheit); the January mean is −8.7 degrees Celsius (20 degrees Fahrenheit), while the August average is 24 degrees Celsius (80 degrees Fahrenheit). Annual rainfall averages 1,000 millimetres (40 inches).

== Economy ==
The cultivated land is irrigated, with crops including rice, maize, soybeans, wheat, barley, and tobacco. Aquaculture is also practiced. There are various mines and factories producing machinery including pumps.

== Transportation ==
The P'yŏngŭi Line of the Korean State Railway passes through Tongrim county on its way between Sinŭiju and P'yŏngyang.

== Places of interest ==
Noted landmarks include Tongrim Falls, a 10-meter waterfall, and the Tongrim Manchurian Ash, which is North Korean natural monument No. 11.

== See also ==
- Geography of North Korea
- North Pyongan
