= Ryongchon disaster =

2004 train wreck in North Korea

Coordinates: 39°58′50″N 124°27′31″E

Ryongchŏn train disaster
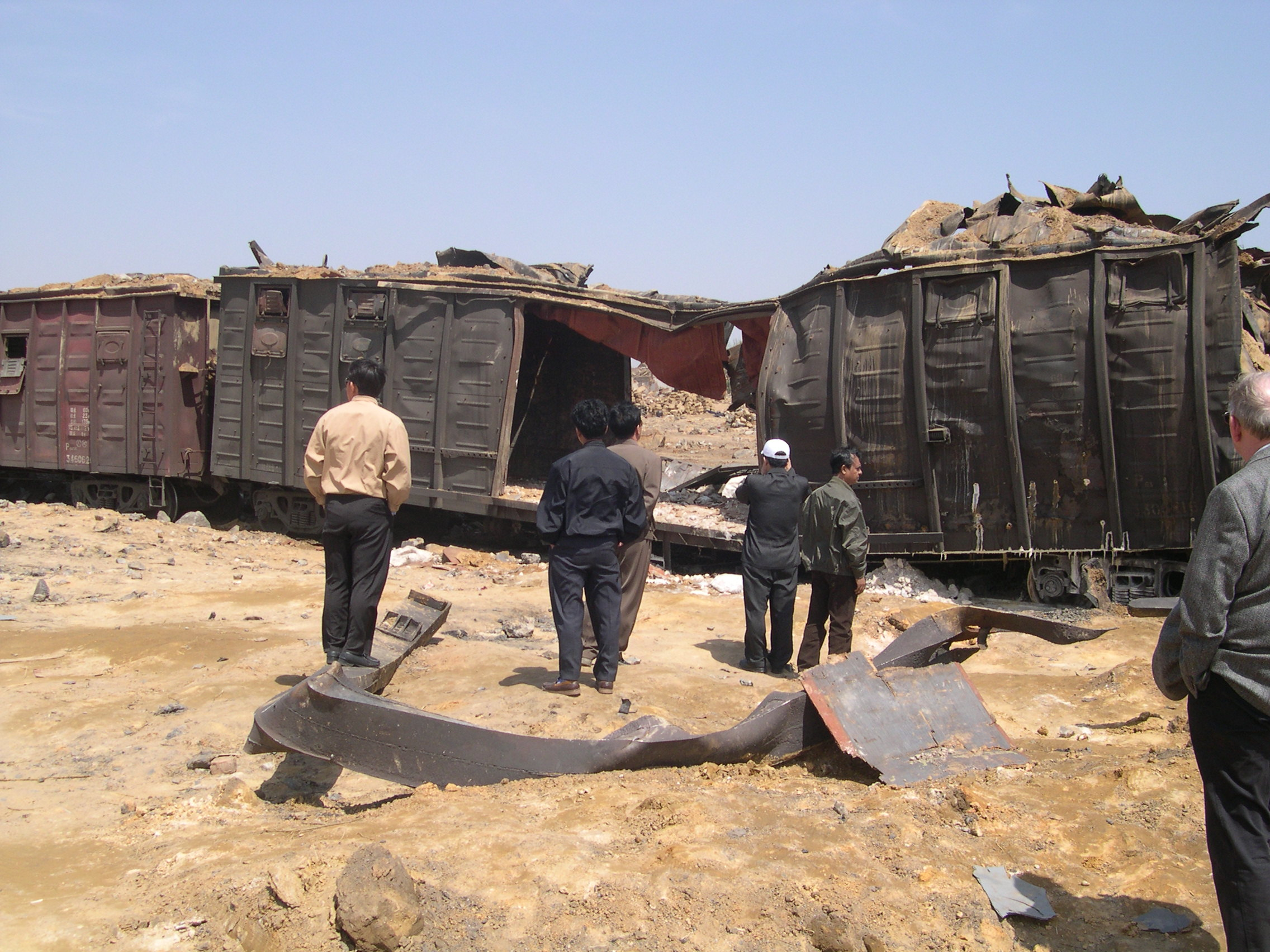
- The wreckage of the train after the disaster.

Details
- Date: 22 April 2004; 4:00 PM GMT
- Location: Ryongchŏn, Ryongchŏn County, North Korea

Statistics
- Trains: Two cargo trains carrying explosive material
- Deaths: •54–162 (official North Korean claim) •3,000+ (South Korean estimate)
- Injured: 3,000–6,000+
- Damage: ~1,850 buildings destroyed or severely damaged, ~6,450 buildings lightly or moderately damaged.

The Ryongchŏn disaster was a train disaster that occurred on 22 April 2004 in the town of Ryongchŏn, North Korea, near the border with China. At least 54 people were killed in the disaster.

The disaster occurred when flammable cargo exploded at Ryongchon Station at around 13:00 local time (04:00 GMT). The news was released by South Korean media outlets, which reported that up to 3,000 people had been killed or injured in the blast and subsequent fires. The North Korean government declared a state of emergency in the region, but little information has been made public by the North Korean government. Shortly after the accident, the North Korean government cut telephone lines to the outside world.

As of 2024, it remains the second-deadliest rail accident in North Korea, and the third-deadliest in Korean history, being surpassed by the Gupo Mugunghwa-Ho Derailment (South Korea) and the Dancheon train disaster (North Korea).

== Effects ==
The Red Cross was allowed into the area, in an unusual concession from the North Korean authorities, becoming the only outside agency to see the disaster area. According to the initial agency report, 160 people were killed and 1,300 were injured in the disaster. However, official casualty reports the following day listed 54 deaths and 1,249 injuries. A wide area was reported to have been affected, with some airborne debris reportedly falling across the border in China. The Red Cross reported that 1,850 houses and buildings had been destroyed and another 6,350 had been damaged.

On 23 April 2004, the United Nations received an appeal for international aid from North Korea's government. The following day, a few diplomats and aid workers were allowed into the country to assess the disaster.

== Cause ==
The cause and nature of the accident have been the subject of considerable speculation, with several different accounts being reported.

- It was initially reported that the explosion was the result of a collision between two trains carrying gasoline (petrol) and liquified petroleum gas, possibly donated by China to alleviate the ongoing North Korean fuel shortage.
- Diplomats and aid workers in North Korea later suggested that the explosion took place when explosive materials were being shunted in rail cars, possibly being triggered by a collision with a live electric power cable. This is corroborated by reports by North Korean officials to Russia's Itar-Tass news agency, and by government sources to Japan's Kyodo news service. The material was said to be intended for use in canal construction. The official Chinese news agency Xinhua reported that there had been a leak of ammonium nitrate, a substance which is used in some explosives, as a fertilizer, and in rocket fuel. The Sunday Telegraph attributed the disaster to "the explosion of a train carrying ammonium nitrate".

KCNA, the state news service, apparently confirmed the Xinhua report by stating the incident was "due to the electrical contact caused by carelessness during the shunting of wagons loaded with ammonium-nitrate fertilizer".

North Korean leader Kim Jong-il passed through the station several hours before the explosion as he returned from a meeting in China. It was suggested that the explosion might have been an assassination attempt, but South Korean intelligence services believed that it was an accident. One theory is that one of the trains involved was carrying fuel from China. If the incident did involve a train collision, it has been suggested that the cause of the accident may have been a miscommunication related to the changes in train timetables due to Kim Jong-il's itinerary.

Other observers have suggested that the poor state of North Korea's railway system may have contributed to the disaster. It accounts for about 90% of freight transport; a lack of fuel forces most vehicles off roads. The railway, built by the Japanese during their occupation of the country, is reported to be in poor repair, with elderly rolling stock running no faster than 65 kilometres per hour (40 mph) (in part due to the poor state of North Korea's electrical supply).

== North Korean government response ==
According to North Korean defector Thae Yong-ho, Kim Jong-il ordered the execution of several transport officials after the disaster.

== In popular culture ==
Days and Nights of Confrontation (Korean: 대결의 낮과 밤), a North Korean film released in 2025, depicted the incident as an assassination attempt against Kim Jong-il.

== See also ==
- List of ammonium nitrate disasters
- Transport in North Korea
