= Tasadohang station =

Railway station in Yomju County, North Korea

Tasadohang 다사도항

Korean name
- Hangul: 다사도항역
- Hanja: 多獅島港驛
- Revised Romanization: Dasadohang-yeok
- McCune–Reischauer: Tasadohang-yŏk

General information
- Location: Tasa-rodongjagu, Yŏmju-gun, North P'yŏngan; North Korea
- Owner: Korean State Railway
- Tracks: 2 + 1 siding

History
- Opened: 31 October 1939
- Original company: Tasado Railway

Services
Preceding station	Korean State Railway	Following station
Terminus	Tasado Line	Tasado towards Ryongch'ŏn
Location

Tasadohang station (Tasado Port station) is a freight-only railway station in Tasa Workers' District, Yŏmju County, North P'yŏngan Province, North Korea, the terminus of the Tasado Line of the Korean State Railway. The line continues beyond the station to siding at Kwakkot Ch'oe Harbour to serve the base of the Korean People's Navy Unit 164 located there.

== History ==
The station was opened on 31 October 1939 by the Tasado Railway, along with the rest of the Tasado Line from Sinŭiju to here.
