= Tokhyon Line =

Railway line in North Korea

Tŏkhyŏn Line

Overview
- Native name: 덕현선(德峴線)
- Status: Operational
- Owner: Korean State Railway
- Locale: North P'yŏngan
- Termini: South Sinŭiju; Tŏkhyŏn
- Stations: 6

Service
- Type: Heavy rail, Passenger & freight rail Regional rail
- Operator: Korean State Railway

History
- Opened: April 1971

Technical
- Line length: 37.3 km (23.2 mi)
- Number of tracks: Single track
- Track gauge: 1,435 mm (4 ft 8 1/2 in) standard gauge
- Minimum radius: 300 m (980 ft)
- Maximum incline: 12‰
Route map
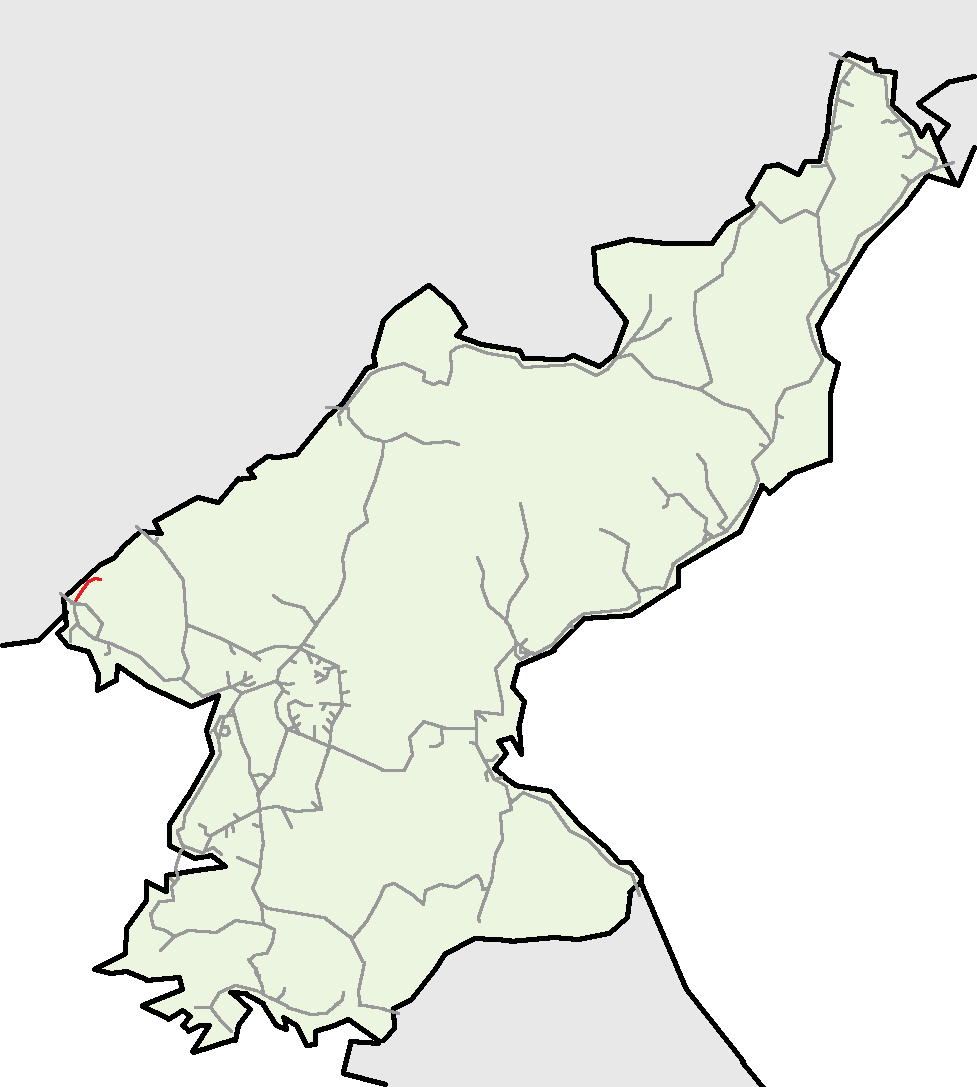

- Tokhyon Line
- Hangul: 덕현선
- Hanja: 徳峴線
- RR: Deokhyeonseon
- MR: Tŏkhyŏnsŏn

The Tŏkhyŏn Line is a non-electrified standard-gauge secondary line of the Korean State Railway in North P'yŏngan Province, North Korea, running from South Sinŭiju on the P'yŏngŭi Line to Tŏkhyŏn.

The ruling grade on the line is 12‰ and the minimum curve radius is 300 m (980 ft). There are 13 bridges with a total length of 373 m (1,224 ft), and there are no tunnels.

== History ==
The Tŏkhyŏn Line was opened by the Korean State Railway in April 1971.

== Services ==
The primary function of the Tŏkhyŏn Line is to deliver iron ore from the mines around Tŏkhyŏn to the September Iron & Steel Complex (9월제철종합기업소) in Sinŭiju and the Hwanghae Iron & Steel Complex on the Songrim Line, thus the bulk of southbound freight is ore from the mines.

Three pairs of commuter trains run on the line between Sinŭiju Ch'ŏngnyŏn and Tŏkhyŏn stations.

== Route ==
A yellow background in the "Distance" box indicates that section of the line is not electrified.

Distance (km)		Station Name		Former Name		
Total	S2S	Transcribed	Chosŏn'gŭl (Hanja)	Transcribed	Chosŏn'gŭl (Hanja)	Connections
0.0	0.0	South Sinŭiju (Namsinŭiju)	남신의주 (南新義州)			P'yŏngŭi Line, Paengma Line
6.1	6.1	Chŏngmulli	정문리 (正門里)			
17.2	11.1	Ŭiju	의주 (義州)			
29.3	12.1	Sujin	수진 (水鎭)			
34.2	4.9	Chŏnggwang	정광 (精鑛)			
37.3	3.1	Tŏkhyŏn	덕현 (德峴)			
