= 12th Infantry Division (South Korea) =

- 제12보병사단
- Active: November 8, 1952 – current
- Country: South Korea
- Branch: Republic of Korea Army
- Type: Infantry
- Role: Guard unit
- Size: Division
- Part of: III Corps
- Garrison/HQ: Inje, Gangwon Province
- Nickname(s): "Eulji"
- Engagements: Korean War; Operation Pokpoong

Commanders
- Current commander: Maj. Gen. Lee Jin-woo

The 12th Infantry Division (Korean: 제12보병사단, Hanja: 第十二步兵師團) is a military formation of the Republic of Korea Army.

== History ==
The division was established on 8 November 1952 under the command of Yoon Chun-gun.

During Korean War, 12th division had defended Inje.

== Current structure ==
- Headquarters:
  - Headquarters Company
  - Intelligence Company
  - Anti-tank Company
  - DMZ Patrol Company
  - Air Defense Company
  - Reconnaissance Battalion
  - Engineer Battalion
  - Armored Battalion (K1 tanks)
  - Signal Battalion
  - Support Battalion
  - Military Police Battalion
  - Medical Battalion
  - Chemical Battalion
- 17th Infantry Brigade (K808 APCs)
  - Originally founded on 20 November 1948 as a 17th Infantry Regiment
  - 17th Infantry Regiment participated in Battle of Inchon.
  - In November 1950, attached to 2nd Infantry Division
  - In October 2019, attached to 12th Infantry Division
  - In December 2020, reorganized and changed the name to 17th Infantry Brigade
- 51st Infantry Brigade (K808 APCs)
- 52nd Infantry Brigade (K808 APCs)
- Artillery Brigade

== Notable former members ==
- Roh Moo-hyun: served in the 52nd Regiment (March 1968~January 1971)
