= Operation Western Region =

- Part of the Korean War
Date	25–28 June 1950
Location	Along the western sector of the 38th Parallel
Result	KPA victory Successful ROK withdrawal

Belligerents
Republic of Korea	Democratic People's Republic of Korea

Commanders and leaders
Chae Byong-duk; Paik Sun-yup; Paik In-yup; Gye In-ju	Kim Ung; Choe Kwang; Pang Ho-san; Choe Hyon; Choe Yul-sok

Strength
1st Infantry Division; 17th Infantry Regiment; Gimpo District Combat Command	1st Infantry Division; 6th Infantry Division; 3rd 38-Guard Brigade; 203rd Armored Regiment

The Operation Western Region (Hangul: 서부지역 작전; Hanja: 西部地域 作戰) was a defensive operation conducted by the Republic of Korea Armed Forces (ROK) between 25 and 28 June 1950 against the Operation Pokpung of the Korean People's Army (KPA) during the beginning of the Korean War. On 25 June 1950, the KPA I Corps launched a surprising attack on the ROK forces located in the western region of the 38th Parallel. The ROK delayed the KPA advance and created conditions for the United Nations to participate early, but lost territories in Ongjin Peninsula and cities nearby Seoul.

== Prelude ==
=== South Korea ===
Colonel Paik Sun-yup assumed command of the 1st Infantry Division on 22 April 1950. He carefully evaluated the 94 km border that his division was responsible for, from Chongdan to Goranpo. After the assessment, he directed a complete overhaul of the existing operational plan. The new plan required the Republic of Korea (ROK) to give up control of Chongdan, Yonan, and Kaesong districts to establish a primary defense line along Imjin River. The new plan was approved by Major General Chae Byong-duk, the Chief of Staff of ROKA. The 1st Division, with the help of civilians, constructed defensive positions from early May to early June. The plan also involved the destruction of Imjin Railway Bridge.

Republic of Korea Army

- (Ongjin Peninsula)
  - 17th Infantry Regiment - Colonel Paik In-yup
- (Yonan, Kaesong, Munsan)
  - 1st Infantry Division - Colonel Paik Sun-yup
- (Ganghwa, Gimpo)
  - Gimpo District Combat Command - Colonel Gye In-ju

=== North Korea ===
Korean People's Army Ground Force

- I Corps - Major General Kim Ung / Brigadier General Kim Chae-uk / Brigadier General Yu Sin
  - (Ongjin & Yonan Peninsula direction) - participant
    - 3rd 38-Guard Brigade - Brigadier General Choe Hyon
      - 1st Regiment, 6th Infantry Division (attached) - Colonel Kim Hu-chin
  - (Kaesong direction) - participant
    - 6th Infantry Division - Brigadier General Pang Ho-san
    - 2nd Battalion, 17th Artillery Regiment
  - (Munsan direction) - participant
    - 1st Infantry Division - Brigadier General Choe Kwang
    - 203rd Regiment, 105th Armored Brigade - Colonel Choe Yul-sok
  - (Reserves) - non-participant
    - 13th Infantry Division - Brigadier General Choe Yong-chin
    - 15th Infantry Division - Brigadier General Pak Song-chol
  - (Dongducheon direction) - non-participant
    - 4th Infantry Division - Brigadier General Lee Kwon-mu
    - 3rd Battalion, 203rd Armored Regiment
    - 1st Battalion, 17th Artillery Regiment
  - (Pocheon direction) - non-participant
    - 3rd Infantry Division - Brigadier General Lee Yong-ho
    - 105th Armored Brigade - Brigadier General Ryu Kyong-su
    - 3rd Battalion, 17th Artillery Regiment

== Battles ==
=== Battle of Ongjin Peninsula ===
The KPA deployed their 1st Regiment from the 1st Infantry Division to assist the 3rd 38-Guard Brigade in taking over the Ongjin Peninsula. The ROK 17th Infantry Regiment was responsible for defending a 45 km front to protect the peninsula, but was overstretched. On June 25, the 17th Regiment stationed the 1st Battalion on the left and the 3rd Battalion on the right to defend the 38th parallel against the KPA invasion. Although the ROK was able to counterattack the 3rd 38-Guard Brigade with the 2nd Battalion and rescue the 1st Battalion, their success was limited. The KPA 1st Infantry Regiment broke the defense line of the 3rd Battalion around 13:00 and effectively split the 17th Regiment in half.

On 26 June, the Republic of Korea (ROK) initiated the evacuation process from Ongjin Peninsula. The 3rd Battalion was successfully rescued by a Republic of Korea Navy ship at Pupo, while the 1st and 2nd Battalion were evacuated from the peninsula at Sagot using civilian ships. Many ROKs were able to leave the peninsula, and the 17th Regiment completed regrouping at Daejeon.

=== Battle of Kaesong–Munsan–Bongilcheon ===
On 25 June, the KPA I Corps directed its main force towards Dongducheon and Pocheon. However, they also deployed a significant number of troops to attack the ROK 1st Infantry Division. The KPA sent the 1st and 6th Infantry Division, along with the 203rd Armored Regiment, to carry out the attack. The ROK 1st Division was responsible for defending a 94 km front line that extended from Chongdan to Gorangpo, along the 38th Parallel. The left flank of the ROK 1st Division was guarded by the 12th Regiment, while the right was guarded by the 13th Regiment. The 11th Regiment was undergoing training at Susaek and acted as a reserve force. The 12th Regiment had to face challenging geography, as their only ground escape was via the Imjin River Railway Bridge.

After the artillery shellings, the KPA launched tank-led attack on all the front lines. This forced the ROK to retreat from their frontline positions to the main defense positions, and delaying the KPA advance in the process. The 12th Regiment withdrew from Kaesong to Gimpo by crossing the river. The 13th Regiment secured possible landing points near Gorangpo, while the 11th Regiment was brought to Munsan. The ROK was able to secure the zone until 26 June, but the KPA managed to cross Imjin River at Gayeoul (37.990°N 126.913°E) thus posing a threat to the 13th Regiment. In addition, news of the loss of Uijeongbu reached the 1st Division. This gave the KPA an opportunity to surround the ROK division, so the 1st Division relocated its defense position to Bongilcheon to avoid getting surrounded.

On 27 June, the ROK 1st Division received reinforcements and launched a counterattack the next day. Although the counterattack achieved some success, the KPA began to flank the ROK forces. Additionally, the United States Air Forces indiscriminately bombed targets as they were unable to distinguish between friend or foe on the ground. Therefore, the 1st Division withdrew from its position and crossed Han River for evacuation.

=== Battle of Ganghwa–Gimpo ===
On 26 June, the KPA 6th Infantry Division planned an attack on Seoul and the ROK 1st Infantry Division from the west by landing on Gimpo. In order to prevent the KPA from landing, the ROK Army Headquarters created the Gimpo District Combat Command by combining various units, including forces from the 12th Infantry Regiment that had previously evacuated to Gimpo. On 27 June, the KPA 6th Division landed on Gimpo and drove the ROK forces away from the coastline. The major KPA offensive began on 28 June, and the Combat Command was forced to retreat after the defense line was broken through.
