= Battle of Kyongju =

Part of the Korean War

- Part of the Battle of Pusan Perimeter
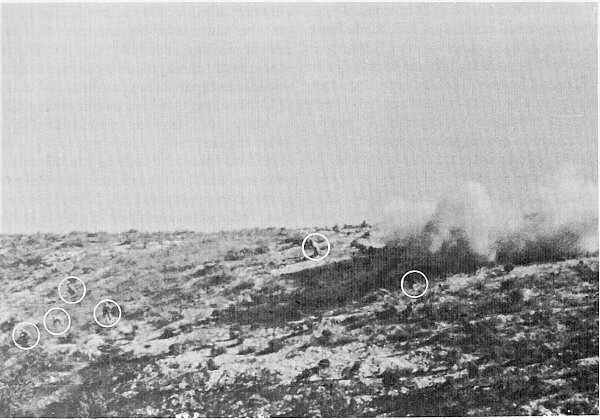
- Men of K Company, US 21st Infantry under mortar attack on Hill 99, September 2.
| Date | August 27 – September 12, 1950 |
| Location | Kyongju, South Korea 35°51′N 129°13′E |
| Result | United Nations victory |

Belligerents
| United Nations: United States; South Korea | North Korea |

Commanders and leaders
| (United States) John B. Coulter (United States) John H. Church (First Republic of Korea) Kim Hong-il (First Republic of Korea) Kim Paik Il | (North Korea) Kim Mu Chong |

Units involved
| (First Republic of Korea) I Corps; (First Republic of Korea) Capital Division; (First Republic of Korea) 3rd Division; (First Republic of Korea) 7th Division; (First Republic of Korea) 17th Regiment; (United States) 24th Division | (North Korea) II Corps; (North Korea) 5th Division; (North Korea) 12th Division; (North Korea) 17th Armored Brigade |

Strength
| US: 14,750; ROK: 23,500 | 12,000 |

Casualties and losses
| heavy | heavy |

The Battle of Kyongju was an engagement between United Nations Command (UN) and North Korean forces early in the Korean War from August 31 to September 15, 1950, in the vicinity of Kyongju in South Korea. It was a part of the Battle of Pusan Perimeter, and was one of several large engagements fought simultaneously. The battle ended in a victory for the UN after large numbers of United States Army (US) and Republic of Korea Army (ROKA) troops repelled a strong North Korean Korean People's Army (KPA) attack.

Holding a line north of P'ohang-dong, An'gang-ni, and Kyongju, the so-called "Kyongju corridor," the ROKA I Corps was unexpectedly hit with an attack by the KPA's II Corps, part of the wider Great Naktong Offensive. The ROKA troops, already demoralized and struggling to maintain a strong defensive line, were easily pushed back from their positions. US units were called in to assist the ROKA to repel the attack.

Fighting was heavy and the two sides fought to capture and recapture P'ohang-dong and An'gang-ni, with the KPA seeking to break through the Kyongju corridor as a way to attack the UN base at Pusan. However, with large amounts of UN air and naval support, the US and ROK forces were able to rout and force back the KPA troops after two weeks of fighting.

== Background ==
=== Pusan Perimeter ===
From the outbreak of the Korean War and the invasion of South Korea by the North, the KPA had enjoyed superiority in both manpower and equipment over both the ROKA and the UN forces dispatched to South Korea to prevent it from collapsing. The KPA strategy was to aggressively pursue UN and ROKA forces on all avenues of approach south and to engage them aggressively, attacking from the front and initiating a double envelopment of both flanks of the unit, which allowed the KPA to surround and cut off the opposing force, which would then be forced to retreat in disarray, often leaving behind much of its equipment. From their initial June 25 offensive to fights in July and early August, the KPA used this strategy to effectively defeat any UN force and push it south. However, when the UN forces, under the Eighth United States Army, established the Pusan Perimeter in August, the UN troops held a continuous line along the peninsula which KPA troops could not outflank, and their advantages in numbers decreased daily as the superior UN logistical system brought in more troops and supplies to the UN forces.

When the KPA approached the Pusan Perimeter on August 5, they attempted the same frontal assault technique on the four main avenues of approach into the perimeter. Throughout August, the KPA 6th Division, and later the 7th Division engaged the US 25th Infantry Division at the Battle of Masan, initially repelling a UN counteroffensive before countering with battles at Komam-ni and Battle Mountain. These attacks stalled as UN forces, well equipped and with plenty of reserves, repeatedly repelled KPA attacks. North of Masan, the KPA 4th Division and the US 24th Infantry Division sparred in the Naktong Bulge area. In the First Battle of Naktong Bulge, the KPA division was unable to hold its bridgehead across the river as large numbers of US reserve forces were brought in to repel it, and on August 19, the KPA 4th Division was forced back across the river with 50 percent casualties. In the Taegu region, five KPA divisions were repulsed by three UN divisions in several attempts to attack the city during the Battle of Taegu. Particularly heavy fighting took place at the Battle of the Bowling Alley where the KPA 13th Division was almost completely destroyed in the attack. On the east coast, three more KPA divisions were repulsed by the ROKA at P'ohang-dong during the Battle of P'ohang-dong. All along the front, the KPA troops were reeling from these defeats, the first time in the war their strategies were not working.

=== September push ===
In planning its new offensive, the KPA command decided any attempt to flank the UN force was impossible thanks to the support of the UN naval forces. Instead, they opted to use frontal attack to breach the perimeter and collapse it as the only hope of achieving success in the battle. Fed by intelligence from the Soviet Union the North Koreans were aware the UN forces were building up along the Pusan Perimeter and that it must conduct an offensive soon or it could not win the battle. A secondary objective was to surround Taegu and destroy the UN units in that city. As part of this mission, the KPA would first cut the supply lines to Taegu.

On August 20, the KPA commands distributed operations orders to their subordinate units. The plan called for a simultaneous five-prong attack against the UN lines. These attacks would overwhelm the UN defenders and allow the KPA to break through the lines in at least one place to force the UN forces back. Five battle groupings were ordered. The easternmost of these was for the KPA 12th and 5th Divisions break through the ROK Capital and 3rd Infantry Divisions to P'ohang-dong and Kyongju.

== Battle ==
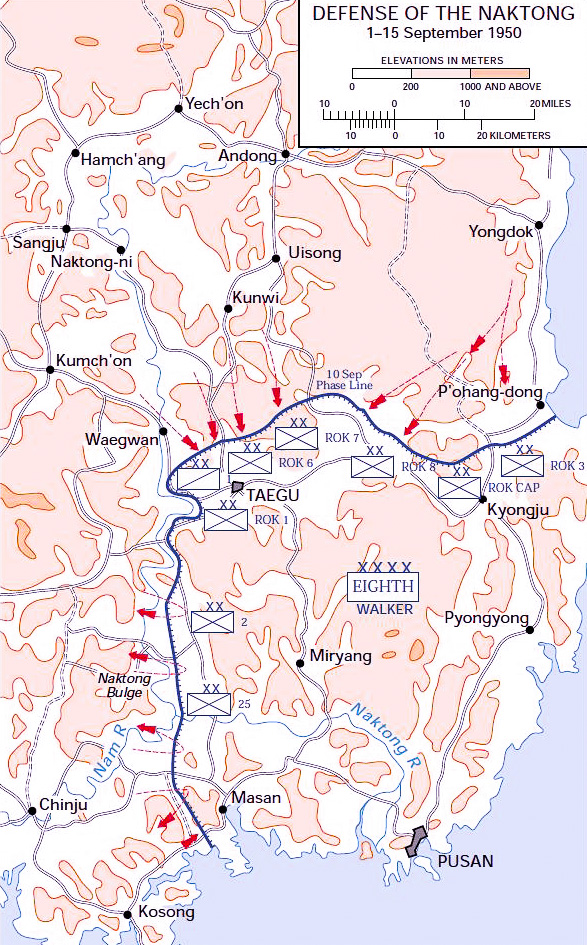
Map of the Pusan Perimeter Defensive line in September 1950 the Kyongju corridor is the northeasternmost sector

The KPA attack struck first on the UN's right flank on Korea's east coast. Although the KPA II Corps general attack in the north and east was planned for September 2, the KPA 12th Division, now with a strength of 5,000 men, started to move forward from the mountains earlier than planned, from where it had reorganized after its defeat in the Kigye and P'ohang-dong area. The division was low in food supply, weapons, and ammunition, and its men suffered from low morale. On August 26, US and ROKA officers in the P'ohang-dong and Kigye area were optimistic; they congratulated each other on having repulsed what they thought was the last serious threat to the Pusan Perimeter.

=== Early attack ===
Facing the KPA 12th Division was the ROKA Capital Division. At 04:00 August 27, a KPA attack overran one company of the ROKA 17th Regiment, Capital Division, north of Kigye. This caused the whole regiment to buckle and retreat. Then the ROKA 18th Regiment to the east fell back because of its exposed flank. The ROKA 17th Regiment lost the town of Kigye in pulling back, and the entire Capital Division fell back 3 miles (4.8 km) to the south side of the Kigye valley.

At a briefing in Taegu on August 27, Eighth Army commander Lieutenant general Walton Walker showed his concern over this development. One of those present was Major general John B. Coulter who had arrived in Korea about a month earlier. Half an hour after the briefing ended, Walker ordered Coulter to observe the ROKA troops on the east. Coulter flew to Kyongju, arriving there at 12:00 that day. Walker in the meantime formally appointed Coulter Deputy Commander, Eighth Army, placing him in command of the ROKA I Corps which controlled the Capital and 3rd Divisions, the US 21st Infantry Regiment, the 3rd Battalion, US 9th Infantry Regiment and the 73rd Medium Tank Battalion, less C Company. Coulter designated these units Task Force Jackson and established his headquarters in the same building in Kyongju in which the ROKA I Corps' commander and the KMAG officers had their command post.

When he arrived at Kyongju that day, Coulter found ROKA I Corps disintegrating rapidly and in low morale. Walker had instructed him to issue his orders to the ROKA I Corps commander as advice, which Coulter did. Coulter had the mission of eliminating the KPA penetration in the Kigye area and of seizing and organizing the high ground extending from north of Yongch'on to the coast at Wolp'o-ri, about 12 miles (19 km) north of P'ohang-dong. This line passed 10 miles (16 km) north of Kigye. Coulter was to attack as soon as possible with Task Force Jackson to gain the first high ground north of Kigye. The US 21st Infantry Regiment was moving to a position north of Taegu on the morning of August 27, when Walker revoked its orders and instructed it to turn around and proceed as rapidly as possible to Kyongju and report to Coulter. The regiment departed Taegu at 10:00 and arrived at Kyongju that afternoon. Coulter immediately sent the 3rd Battalion north to An'gang-ni where it went into a position behind the ROKA Capital Division.

=== UN counterattack ===
Coulter's plan to attack on August 28 had to be postponed. Major general Kim Hong Il, the ROKA I Corps commander, told him he could not attack, that there were too many casualties and the South Korean were exhausted. The KPA 5th Division above P'ohang-dong had begun to press south again and the ROKA 3rd Division in front of it began to show signs of pulling back. On the 28th, the KMAG adviser to the ROKA 3rd Division, at a time he deemed favorable, advised ROKA Brigadier general Kim Suk Won, the division commander, to counterattack, but Kim refused to do so. The next day Kim said he was going to move his command post out of P'ohang-dong. The KMAG adviser replied that the KMAG group was going to stay in P'ohang-dong. Upon hearing that, Kim became hysterical but decided to stay for the time being to avoid loss of face. That day, August 28, Walker issued a special statement addressed to the ROKA, and meant also for the South Korean Minister of Defense, Shin Sung-mo. He called on the ROKA troops to hold their lines in the Pusan Perimeter, and implored the rest of the UN troops to defend their ground as firmly as possible, counterattacking as necessary to prevent the KPA from consolidating their gains.

The ROKA disorganization was so great in the face of continued KPA pressure that Task Force Jackson could not launch its planned attack. The US 21st Infantry was in an assembly area north of An'gang-ni and ready for an attack the morning of the 28th, but during the night the ROKA 17th Regiment lost its position on the high ridge northward at the bend of the Kigye valley, and the attack was canceled. The ROKA regained their position in the afternoon but that night lost it again. At the same time, elements of the KPA 5th Division penetrated the ROKA 3rd Division southwest of P'ohang-dong. Coulter directed the 21st Infantry to repel this penetration. During the day on August 29, B Company, 21st Infantry, supported by a platoon of tanks of B Company, 73rd Medium Tank Battalion, successfully counterattacked northwest from the southern edge of P'ohang-dong for a distance of 1.5 miles (2.4 km), with ROKA troops following. The US units then withdrew to P'ohang-dong. That night the ROKA withdrew, and the next day a US infantry-tank force repeated the action of the day before. The 21st Infantry then took over from the ROKA 3rd Division a sector extending north and northwest of P'ohang-dong.

Also on August 29, the ROKA Capital Division, with US tank and artillery support, recaptured Kigye and held it during the night against KPA counterattacks, only to lose it again at dawn. UN air attacks continued at an increased tempo in the Kigye area. ROKA troops reported finding the bodies of many KPA, apparently killed by air attack. They also found many suits of white clothing scattered on the ground, abandoned when KPA soldiers changed from civilian disguises into military uniforms.

With this air action in the Kigye area, US naval vessels continued their efforts to help stop the KPA 5th Division on the east coast. A cruiser and two destroyers concentrated their firepower on the Hunghae area 5 miles (8.0 km) north of P'ohang-dong where the KPA 5th Division's troop assembly and forward supply center were located. On August 29 and 30 the three vessels fired almost 1,500 5-inch shells at targets there in support of the ROKA 3rd Division. Despite this aerial and naval support, on August 31 the battle continued to go against the ROKA forces both at Kigye and P'ohang-dong.

=== Kigye recaptured ===
UN aerial observation on September 1 discovered the KPA were moving southward in the mountains above Kigye and P'ohang-dong. The next day another major attack was forming north and northwest of Kigye. In the afternoon, KMAG advisers with the Capital Division estimated that 2,500 KPA soldiers had penetrated a gap between the ROKA 17th and 18th Regiments.

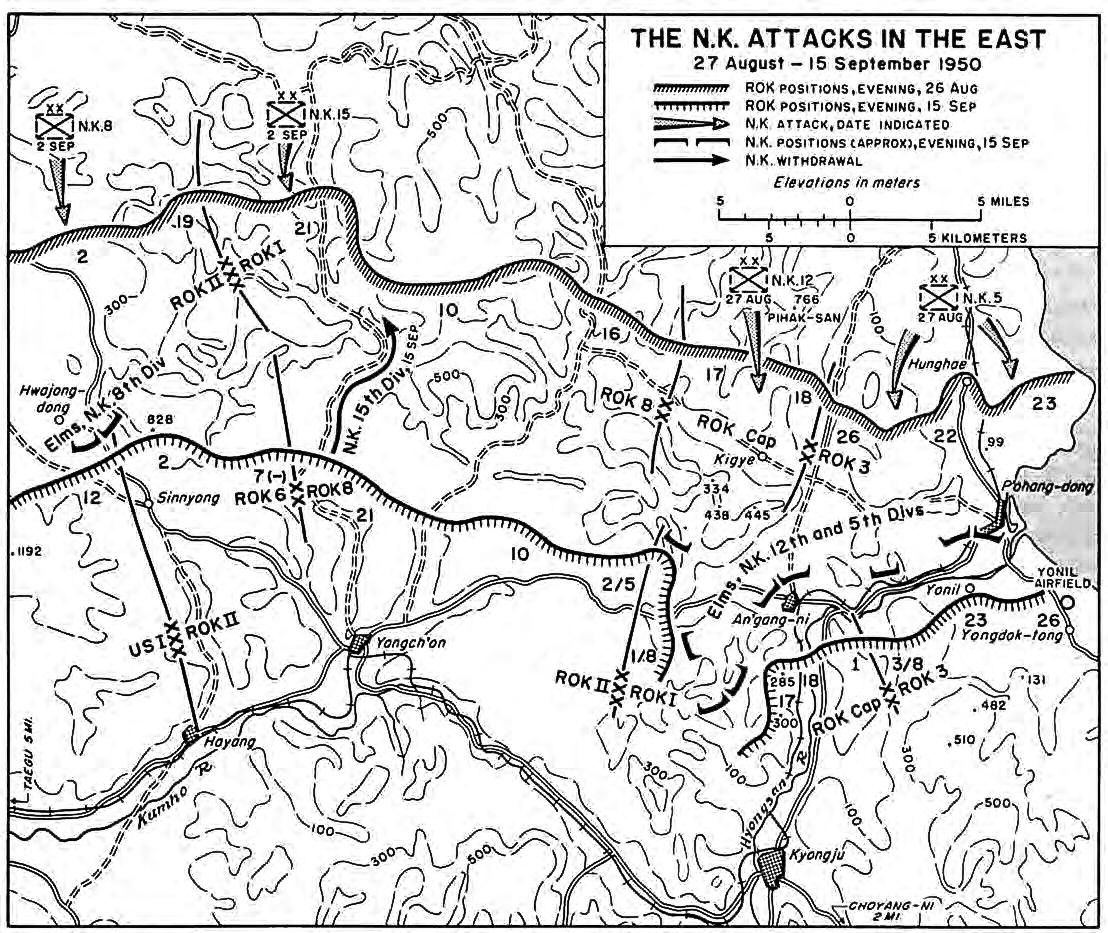
North Korean attacks on the Kyoongju corridor, August 27 – September 15, 1950

At the same time, KPA pressure built up steadily north of P'ohang-dong, where the KPA 5th Division fed replacements on to Hill 99 (36.107°N 129.353°E) in front of the ROKA 23rd Regiment. This hill became almost as notorious as had Hill 181 near Yongdok earlier because of the almost continuous and bloody fighting there for its control. Although aided by UN air attacks and artillery and naval gunfire, the ROKA 3rd Division was unable to capture this hill, and suffered many casualties in the effort. On September 2 the US 21st Infantry attacked northwest from P'ohang-dong in an effort to help the ROKA recapture Hill 99. A platoon of tanks followed the valley road between P'ohang-dong and Hunghae. The regimental commander assigned K Company Hill 99 as its objective. The 21st Infantry made very slow progress in this attack and casualties were heavy. By 15:25 that afternoon, K Company could account for only 35 of its men, the rest killed, wounded or missing. The company was unable to take Hill 99 from the well dug-in KPA who threw large numbers of hand grenades to repel all efforts to reach the top. Two tanks of the 6th Tank Battalion were lost in this attack, one in a mine field and another because of a thrown track. At dusk a KPA penetration occurred along the boundary between the ROKA Capital and 3rd Divisions 3 miles (4.8 km) east of Kigye.

The next morning, September 2 at 01:30, the KPA 12th Division, executing its part of the coordinated KPA II Corps' general attack, struck the Capital Division on the high hill masses south of the Kigye valley. This attack threw back the ROKA 18th Regiment on the left in the area of Hills 334 and 438, and the ROKA 17th Regiment on the right in the area of Hill 445. By dawn of September 3, the KPA penetration there had reached the vital east–west corridor road 3 miles (4.8 km) east of An'gang-ni. As a result of this gain during the night, the KPA 12th Division had advanced 5 miles (8.0 km) and the Capital Division all but collapsed.

This forced Coulter to withdraw the 21st Infantry from the line northwest of P'ohang-dong and concentrate it in the vicinity of Kyongju. The 2nd Battalion had joined the regiment on August 31, but Coulter had held it in the task force's reserve at An'gang-ni. That battalion now took up a horseshoe-shaped defense position around the town, with some elements on high ground 2 miles (3.2 km) east where they protected the Kyongju to P'ohang-dong highway. The rest of the regiment closed into an assembly area north of Kyongju. At the same time, Walker started the newly activated ROKA 7th Division toward the KPA penetration. Its 5th Regiment closed at Yongch'on that afternoon, and the ROKA 3rd Regiment, less its 1st Battalion, closed at Kyongju in the evening. Walker also authorized Coulter to use the 3rd Battalion, 9th Infantry; the 9th Infantry Regimental Tank Company; and the 15th Field Artillery Battalion as he deemed advisable. These units, held at Yonil Airfield for its defense, had not previously been available for commitment elsewhere.

=== Fall of An'gang-ni ===
During the day on September 3, KMAG advisers at P'ohang-dong sent Coulter a message that the ROKA 3rd Division commander was preparing to withdraw from P'ohang-dong. Coulter went immediately to the ROKA I Corps commander and had him order ROKA 3rd Division would not withdraw. Coulter checked every half-hour to see that the division stayed in its P'ohang-dong positions. That night, September 3–4, the remainder of the ROK I Corps front collapsed. Three KPA T-34 tanks overran a battery of ROKA artillery and then scattered two battalions of the newly arrived ROKA 5th Regiment. Following a mortar preparation, the KPA entered An'gang-ni at 02:20. An hour later the command post of the Capital Division withdrew from the town and fighting became increasingly confused. By 04:00 US tanks ceased firing because remnants of the Capital Division had become intermingled with KPA forces. At daylight, G Company, US 21st Infantry, discovered that it was alone in An'gang-ni, nearly surrounded by the KPA. ROKA troops had disappeared. At 18:10, G Company withdrew from the town and dug in along the road eastward near the rest of the 2nd Battalion, 21st Infantry at the bridge over the Hyongsan-gang. KPA held the town and extended southward along the railroad.

Receiving orders to withdraw and join the regiment above Kyongju, the 2nd Battalion, 21st Infantry had to fight through a KPA roadblock on the east side of the Hyongsan-gang 3 miles (4.8 km) southeast of An'gang-ni. Upon arrival, it discovered that G Company was missing and the battalion had to turn around and get G Company. The 2nd Battalion fought its way back north and found G Company at the bridge. Reunited, the battalion fought its way out again, with tanks firing down the road ahead of the column and into the hills along the sides. KPA fire knocked the tracks off three US M46 Patton tanks. US artillery then destroyed them to prevent KPA use. The 2nd Battalion arrived in the Kyongju area shortly before 12:00.

=== Kyongju threatened ===
By 12:00 on September 4, KPA units had established roadblocks along the Kyongju-An'gang-ni road within 3 miles (4.8 km) of Kyongju. A 2 miles (3.2 km) gap existed between the ROKA 3rd and Capital Divisions in the P'ohang-dong area. But the big break in the UN line was in the high mountain mass west of the Hyongsan valley and southwest of An'gang-ni. In this area northwest of Kyongju there was an 8 miles (13 km) gap between the Capital Division and the ROKA 8th Division to the west. From that direction the KPA posed a threat to the railroad and the road net running south through the Kyongju corridor to Pusan. Faced with this big gap on his left flank, Coulter put the US 21st Infantry in the broad valley and on its bordering hills northwest of Kyongju to block any approach from that direction.

The situation at Kyongju during the evening of September 4 was tense. Kim Hong Il, the ROKA I Corps' commander, proposed to evacuate the town. He said that the KPA were only 3 miles (4.8 km) away on the hills to the north, and that they would attack and overrun the town that night. Coulter told him that he would not move his command post. Coulter put four tanks around the building where the command posts were located. Out on the roads he stationed KMAG officers to round up ROKA stragglers and get them into positions at the edge of the town. One KMAG Major stopped ROKA troops fleeing south, sometimes having to do so with a pistol.

The expected KPA attack on Kyongju, however, never came. The KPA turned east, crossed the highway north of the town, and headed toward Yonil Airfield. The next day the US Air Force (USAF), attacking KPA gun positions 4 miles (6.4 km) north of Kyongju along the road, found many targets in the Kigye-Kyongju-P'ohang-dong triangle as they caught the KPA advancing in the open.

=== Fall of P'ohang-dong ===
At 02:00 September 5, Lieutenant colonel Rollins S. Emmerich, one of the ROKA I Corps' KMAG advisers, hastened to Yonil Airfield where he conferred with Lieutenant colonel D. M. McMains, commanding the 3rd Battalion, 9th Infantry, stationed there, and informed him of the situation in P'ohang-dong. Emmerich obtained a platoon of tanks and returned with them to the town. He placed the tanks in position and awaited the expected KPA armored attack. At 05:30 he received information that elements of the ROKA 22nd Regiment had retreated in the face of KPA attack. KPA troops entered this gap and just before 11:00 the US tanks in P'ohang-dong were under heavy KPA machine gun fire. Five KPA SU-76 self-propelled guns approached and began firing. At a range of one city block the US tanks knocked out the lead gun, killing its three crew members. In the ensuing exchange of fire the other four withdrew. Emmerich then directed air strikes and artillery fire which destroyed the other four guns. But that afternoon at 14:35 the order came to evacuate all materiel and supplies from the Yonil airfield.

That night, September 5–6, events reached a climax inside P'ohang-dong. At midnight, after 10 rounds of KPA mortar or artillery fire struck near it, the ROKA 3rd Division command post moved to another location. KPA fire that followed it to the new location indicated observed and directed fire. The ROKA division commander, Brigadier general Lee Jun Shik and several members of his senior staff claimed they became sick. The division withdrew from P'ohang-dong, and on September 6 it was again in KPA hands. The ROKA command relieved both the I Corps and the 3rd Division commanders. At this time new commanders were appointed for these major commands. Brigadier general Kim Paik Il took command of I Corps, while Capital Division came under command of Colonel Song Yo Ch'an, and the 3rd Division came under command of Colonel Lee Jong Ch'an.

Because the big gap between the ROKA Capital and 8th Divisions made it impossible for ROKA I Corps at Kyongju to direct the action of the 8th Division, the ROKA transferred that division to the control of ROKA II Corps on September 7, and attached to it the ROKA 5th Regiment, 7th Division. This shift of command came just as the KPA 15th Division penetrated the ROKA 8th Division lines to enter Yongch'on in the Taegu-P'ohang-dong corridor. From west of An'gang-ni the ROKA 3rd Regiment drove toward Yongch'on, attempting to close the gap.

=== US 24th Infantry Division arrives ===
The gains of the KPA in the east on September 4 caused Walker to shift still more troops to that area. The day before, he had ordered the US 24th Infantry Division to move from its reserve position near Taegu to the lower Naktong River to relieve the US 1st Provisional Marine Brigade in the Naktong Bulge area of the US 2nd Infantry Division front. It bivouacked that night on the banks of the Naktong near Susan-nil. On the morning of the 4th, before it could begin relief of the Marine forces there, the 24th Infantry Division received a new order to proceed to Kyongju. The assistant division commander, Brigadier general Garrison H. Davidson, proceeding at once by jeep, arrived at Kyongju that evening. Division troops and the US 19th Infantry Regiment started at 13:00 the next day, September 5, and, traveling over muddy roads, most of them arrived at Kyongju just before midnight. Major general John H. Church, the 24th Division commander, had arrived there during the day. All division units had arrived by 07:00, September 6.

Coulter knew the KPA 15th Division had crossed the Taegu lateral corridor at Yongch'on and was heading in the direction of Kyongju. On September 6, he ordered the US 21st Infantry to attack the next day up the valley and bordering hills that lead northwest from Kyongju into the high mountain mass in the direction of Yongch'on. When it attacked there on September 7 the 21st Infantry encountered virtually no opposition.

At 12:30 Eighth Army redesignated Task Force Jackson as Task Force Church, and at 13:00 Coulter departed Kyongju for Taegu to resume his planning duties. Church was now in command on the eastern front. That afternoon, September 7, Church canceled Coulter's order for the 21st Infantry to attack into the mountains. He felt it was a useless dispersion of troops and he wanted the regiment concentrated near Kyongju. Church made still another change in the disposition of the task force. On the 8th he moved its command post from Kyongju to the vicinity of Choyang-ni, 4 miles (6.4 km) south. He believed the command post could be more easily defended there in the open if attacked than in a town, and that traffic congestion near it would be less.

=== Deadlock ===
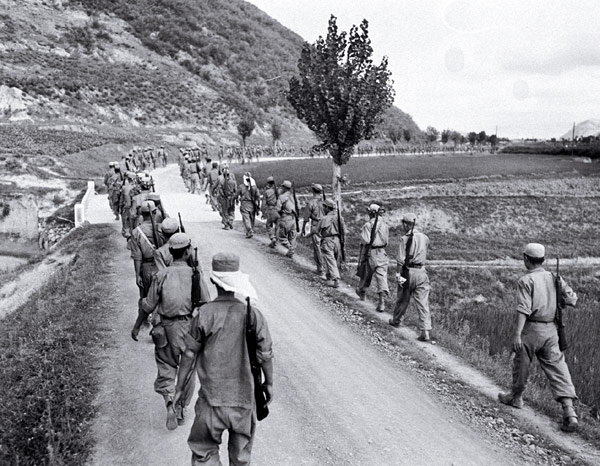
ROK troops advance to the front lines near P'ohang-dong in 1950.

Fighting continued between the KPA and the Capital Division on the hills bordering the valley from An'gang-ni to Kyongju. The US 3rd Battalion, 19th Infantry, became involved there just after midnight on September 8–9. A KPA force attacked K Company and drove it from Hill 300 (35.925°N 129.216°E), a defensive position midway between An'gang-ni and Kyongju. KPA held the hill during September 9 against counterattack. Farther north, on the left side of the valley, the ROKA 17th Regiment attacked and, with the support of the US 13th Field Artillery Battalion, captured Hill 285 and held it against several KPA counterattacks. On the opposite, east side of the valley the ROKA 18th Regiment made limited gains. These battles took place in drenching typhoon rains. Low-hanging clouds allowed very little air support. The rains finally ceased on September 10.

In this second week of September elements of the KPA 5th Division had spread out over the hills west, southwest, and south of P'ohang-dong. One KPA force, estimated to number 1,600 men, reached Hills 482 (35.928°N 129.352°E) and 510, 4.5 miles (7.2 km) southwest of Yonil Airfield. Facing this force were two regiments of the ROKA 3rd Division, which held a defensive position on the hills bordering the west side of the valley south of the airfield. KPA pressure threatened to penetrate between the two ROKA regiments.

On the evening of September 9, Church formed Task Force Davidson to eliminate this threat to Yonil. The airfield itself had not been used since the middle of August except for emergency landing and refueling of planes, but evacuation of USAF equipment, bombs, and petroleum products was still in progress. Davidson commanded the task force, which was composed of the US 19th Infantry, less the 3rd Battalion, the 3rd Battalion of the 9th Infantry, the 13th Field Artillery Battalion, C Battery of the 15th Field Artillery Battalion, A Company of the 3rd Engineer Combat Battalion, the 9th Infantry Regimental Tank Company, two batteries of antiaircraft automatic weapons, and other miscellaneous units.

With the KPA having cut off all other approaches from the Kyongju area, the task force spent all of September 10 making a circuitous southern approach to its objective. It arrived in its assembly area at Yongdok-tong, 1 mile (1.6 km) south of Yonil Airfield, at 19:00 that evening. Davidson early that morning had flown on ahead from Kyongju to Yongdok-tong. Emmerich was there to meet him when his light plane landed on the road. On the flight over, Davidson looked for but did not see any KPA soldiers. Emmerich told Davidson the KPA had driven the ROKA troops from Hill 131 (35.97°N 129.391°E). This hill was on the southern side of the boundary between the two ROKA regiments holding the Yonil defensive position. Davidson and Emmerich agreed that the ROKA troops would have to recapture Hill 131 during the night and that then the task force would attack through the ROKA 3rd Division to capture the main KPA positions on Hill 482. They thought that if the task force could establish the ROKA troops on Hill 482 they should be able to hold it and control the situation thereafter. Emmerich took Davidson to meet the ROKA 3rd Division commander. Davidson told him that he was in command in that area and informed him of his plan for the attack. That night the ROKA troops succeeded recapturing Hill 131 and restoring their lines there. In this attack the ROKA 3rd Engineer Battalion fought as infantry, and under the leadership and guidance of Captain Walter J. Hutchins, the KMAG adviser to the battalion, contributed heavily to the success.

=== North Koreans repulsed ===
The next morning, September 11, the 19th Infantry passed through the left-hand ROKA regiment just south of Hill 131 and, with the 1st Battalion leading, attacked west. At 09:30 it captured without opposition the first hill mass 2 miles (3.2 km) west of its starting point. The 2nd Battalion then passed through the 1st Battalion and continued the attack toward Hill 482 (Unje-san), 1 mile (1.6 km) westward across a steep-sided gorge. There, KPA held entrenched positions, and their machine gun fire checked the 2nd Battalion for the rest of the day. The morning of September 12 four aircraft from No. 77 Squadron RAAF struck the KPA positions with napalm, and an artillery preparation followed the strike. The 2nd Battalion then launched its attack and secured Hill 482 about 12:00. That afternoon, ROKA forces relieved Task Force Davidson on the hill mass, and the task force descended to the valley southwest of Yongdok-tong for the night. On September 13, Task Force Davidson returned to Kyongju.

While this action was in progress near Yonil Airfield, the week-long battle for Hill 300 north of Kyongju came to an end. A regiment of the ROKA 3rd Division captured the hill on September 11. In midafternoon the 3rd Battalion, US 19th Infantry, relieved the ROKA troops there. Scattered over Hill 300 lay 257 counted KPA dead and great quantities of abandoned equipment and weapons, some of it American. In this fighting for Hill 300, the US 3rd Battalion, 19th Infantry, 37 men killed.

September 12 is considered as the day when the KPA offensive in the east ended. By that date, the KPA 12th Division had been virtually destroyed and the KPA 5th Division was trying to consolidate its survivors near P'ohang-dong. Aerial observers reported sighting many KPA groups moving north and east.

The ROKA 3rd Division followed the withdrawing KPA 5th Division, and the ROKA Capital Division advanced against the retreating survivors of the KPA 12th Division. On September 15 some elements of the Capital Division reached the southern edge of An'gang-ni. Reports indicated that KPA troops were retreating toward Kigye. With the threat in the east subsiding, Eighth Army dissolved Task Force Church, effective at 12:00 September 15, and the ROKA resumed control of the ROKA I Corps. Eighth Army also ordered the US 24th Infantry Division to move to Kyongsan, southeast of Taegu, in a regrouping of forces. The US 21st Infantry Regiment had already moved there on the 14th. The US 9th Infantry was to remain temporarily at Kyongju in Eighth Army reserve.

== Aftermath ==
North and South Korean forces suffered heavily in the battle, each side inflicted large numbers of casualties on one another. The exact numbers of casualties are impossible to determine. Both sides are known to have suffered heavily. Following the counterattack at Inchon on 15 September and the breakout from the Pusan Perimeter starting on 16 September, the KPA units in the sector fled back north, no more than a few thousand troops from the KPA 5th and 12th divisions were known to have returned to North Korea. US casualties, in the meantime, were relatively light.

In the eastern battles during the first two weeks of September, the ROKA troops, demoralized though they were, did most of the ground fighting. US tanks, artillery, and ground units supported them. Uncontested UN aerial supremacy and naval gunfire from offshore also supported the ROKA, and probably were the factors that tipped the scales in their favor. After the initial phase of their September offensive, the KPA labored under what proved to be insurmountable difficulties in supplying their forward units. The KPA system of supply could not resolve the problems of logistics and communication necessary to support and exploit an offensive operation in this sector of the front. Nevertheless, the breakthrough was severe enough that the Eighth Army considered pulling back for several days, eventually deciding to stand its ground.
