= 17th Infantry Brigade (South Korea) =

- 제17보병여단
- Active: November 12, 1948 – current
- Country: South Korea
- Branch: Republic of Korea Army
- Type: Infantry
- Role: Guard unit
- Size: Regiment (1948-2020); Brigade (2020-present)
- Part of: 2nd Infantry Division (1950-2019); 12th Infantry Division (2019-present)
- Garrison/HQ: Inje, Gangwon Province
- Nickname: "Ssangho" (means double tigers)
- Engagements: Korean War; Battle of Ongjin; Battle of Kyongju; Battle of Pusan Perimeter; Battle of Inchon; Battle of Seoul

The 17th Infantry Brigade (Korean: 제17보병연대; Hanja: 第十七步兵師團) is a military formation of the Republic of Korea Army.

== History ==
The Brigade was established on 20 November 1948 as an independent 17th Infantry Regiment part of Capital Defence Command.

During Korean War, 17th Infantry Regiment participated in the Battle of Ongjin, the Battle of Kyongju, the Battle of Pusan Perimeter, the Battle of Inchon, the Second Battle of Seoul and many other engagements during the war.

In November 1950, attached to 2nd Infantry Division.

In October 2019, attached to 12th Infantry Division.

In December 2020, reorganized into as the 17th Infantry Brigade.

== See also ==
- Korean War
