= Dasado Railway =

Japanese colonial company in Korea

Dasado Railway Co. Ltd.

Overview
- Native name: 다사도철도주식회사 (Dasado Cheoldo Jusikhoesa) 多獅島鐵道株式會社 (Tashitō Tetsudō Kabushiki Kaisha)

The Dasado Railway (Japanese: 多獅島鐵道株式會社, Tashitō Tetsudō Kabushiki Kaisha; Korean: 다사도철도주식회사, Dasado Cheoldo Jusikhoesa), was a privately owned railway company in Japanese-occupied Korea.

The Dasado Railway opened a 39.5 km (24.5 mi) line from Sinuiju to Dasado Port via Yangsi, called the Dasado Line, on 31 October 1939, to provide the Chōsen Paper Mills Ltd. (a subsidiary of the Oji Paper Company; today the Sinuiju Chemical Fibre Complex) of Sinuiju a means of shipping its products out via the port at Dasado, as the Yalu River freezes in winter. Then, on 29 October 1940 the Dasado Railway opened a line from Yangsi to Namsi, calling it the Namsi Line. The Sinuiju–Yangsi section of the line was transferred to the Chosen Government Railway on 1 April 1943 as the Yangsi Line. Yangsi and Namsi stations were given their current names, Ryongcheon and Yeomju respectively, after the establishment of the DPRK.

After the partition of Korea the line was within the territory of the DPRK, and was nationalised by the Provisional People's Committee for North Korea along with all other railways in the Soviet zone of occupation on 10 August 1946, with the Ryongcheon–Dasado line becoming the Tasado Line, and the Ryongcheon–Yeomju section becoming the Yangsi Line; the Yangsi Line was made the mainline of the Pyeongui Line in 1964, with the former mainline between Yeomju and South Sinuiju becoming the Paengma Line.

== Services ==
In the November 1942 timetable, the last issued prior to the start of the Pacific War, the Dasado Railway was running five daily third-class-only round-trip passenger trains on the Dasado Line, and four daily on the Namsi Line.

Dasado Line
Distance (read down)	Price Korean yen	801	803	805	807	809	Station name	Distance (read up)	Price Korean yen	802	804	806	808	810
0.0	-	08:15	11:31	13:52	17:20	20:30	Sinuiju	35.9	1.40	07:40	13:02	16:28	18:35	21:41
15.4	0.65	08:57	12:21	14:34	18:02	21:10	Yangsi	20.5	0.80	07:05	12:25	15:43	17:58	21:06
22.5	1.05	09:31	13:00	15:08	18:36	21:40	Yongampo	10.0	0.40	06:33	11:51	15:04	17:24	20:34
35.9	1.40	09:55	13:24	15:32	19:00	22:04	Dasado	0.0	-	06:06	11:22	14:28	16:55	20:05

Namsi Line
Distance (read down)	Price Korean yen	-	-	-	-	Station name	Distance (read up)	Price Korean yen	-	-	-	-
0.0	-	09:00	12:35	18:05	21:12	Yangsi	18.6	0.80	06:56	12:01	14:24	20:31
18.6	0.80	09:41	13:16	18:46	21:53	Namsi	0.0	-	06:15	11:20	13:43	19:50
