= Yomju County =

Yŏmju County 염주군
- County

Korean transcription(s)
  - Chosŏn'gŭl: 염주군
  - Hancha: 鹽州郡
  - McCune-Reischauer: Yŏmju-gun
  - Revised Romanization: Yeomju-gun
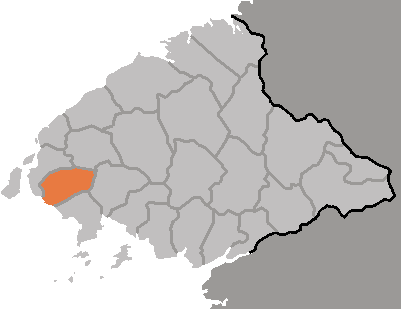
- Country: North Korea
- Province: North P'yŏngan
- Administrative divisions: 1 ŭp, 1 workers' district, 22 ri

Area
  - Total: 288.3 km^{2} (111.3 sq mi)

Population (2008)
  - Total: 113,620
  - Density: 394.1/km^{2} (1,021/sq mi)

Yŏmju County is a kun, or county, in northwestern North P'yŏngan province, North Korea, on the coast of the Yellow Sea. It is bordered by Ryongch'ŏn and P'ihyŏn to the north, Tongrim to the east, and Ch'ŏlsan to the south; to the west lies the ocean. The county was created in 1952 from portions of Ch'ŏlsan and Ryongch'ŏn.

== Geography ==
The terrain of Yŏmju is mostly level or rolling, sloping upward from the southwest to the northeast. In the north and east are small mountains like Mangilsan (613 m). The islands of the Pansŏng archipelago lie offshore and are a noted regional attraction. Other islands include Taedasado and Changdo.

== Administrative divisions ==
Yŏmju county is divided into 1 ŭp (town), 1 rodongjagu (workers' district) and 22 ri (villages):

- Yŏmju-ŭp (염주읍/鹽州邑)
- Tasa-rodongjagu (다사로동자구/多獅勞動者區)
- Chungho-ri (중호리/中虎里)
- Chuŭi-ri (주의리/做儀里)
- Hakso-ri (학소리/鶴巢里)
- Hasŏng-ri (하석리/下石里)
- Hyangbong-ri (향봉리/香峰里)
- In'gwang-ri (인광리/仁光里)
- Naejung-ri (내중리/內中里)
- Namap-ri (남압리/南鴨里)
- Pan'gong-ri (반곡리/盤谷里)
- Pan'gung-ri (반궁리/盤弓里)
- Ryongbung-ri (룡북리/龍北里)
- Ryŏn'gong-ri (련곡리/蓮谷里)
- Ryongsal-li (룡산리/龍山里)
- Ryŏnsal-li (련산리/蓮山里)
- Samgae-ri (삼개리/三介里)
- Sinjŏng-ri (신정리/新亭里)
- Sŏg'am-ri (석암리/石岩里)
- Sŏrim-ri (서림리/西林里)
- Tobong-ri (도봉리/道峰里)
- Tongbal-li (동발리/東鉢里)
- Tongsŏng-ri (동성리/東城里)
- Wiha-ri (외하리/外下里)

== Climate ==
Although warmed somewhat by the sea, the local climate remains basically continental, with an average annual temperature of 8.4 °C reflecting the fluctuation between January's -8.7 °C and August's 24 °C. Annual rainfall is relatively low, 800–1000 mm.

== Economy ==
Due to the level terrain, 54.4% of the land in Yŏmju is cultivated, with only 15% remaining as forestland (mostly pine). The county is North P'yŏngan's second-largest producer of rice; other local crops include soybeans, maize, tobacco, and fruit. Fishing and livestock raising are also important local industries, as is salt harvesting. Yŏmju produces enough salt to satisfy 10% of national demand. A large aquaculture installation also operates in the county, dating from the early 1980s; it is reported to cover more than 1 km², with more than 80 separate ponds.

== Transportation ==
Yŏmju county is served by the P'yŏngŭi, Tasado and Paengma lines of the Korean State Railway.

== Places of interest ==
A large rock in Namap-ri has been designated North Korean natural monument No. 64.

== See also ==
- Geography of North Korea
- Administrative divisions of North Korea
- North Pyongan
