= Ongjin Bay Important Bird Area =

Coordinates: 37°51′00″N 125°15′00″E

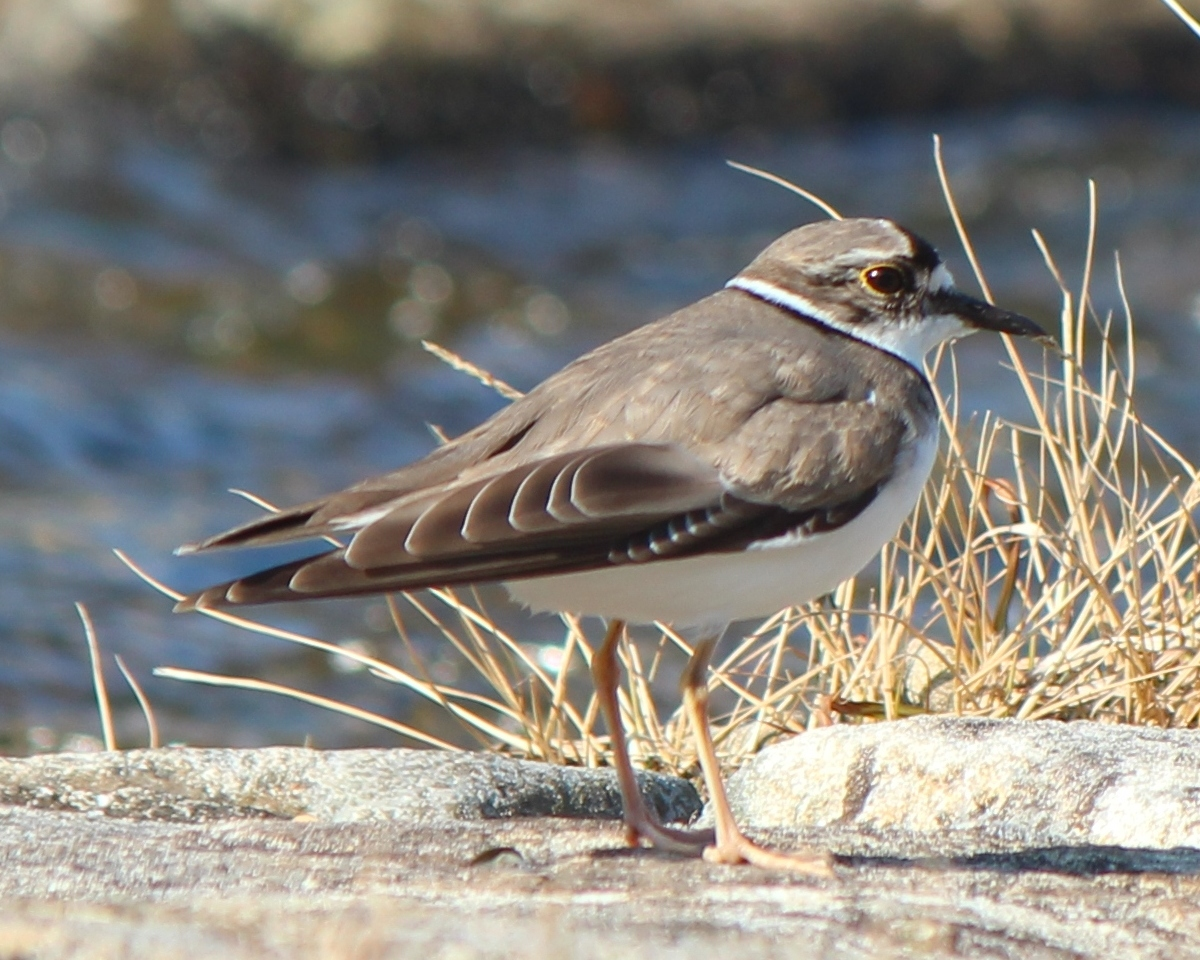
The bay is an important staging site for long-billed plovers

The Ongjin Bay Important Bird Area(옹진재두루미살이터) lies on the western coast of North Korea on the Yellow Sea, in Ongjin County, South Hwanghae. It comprises 3500 ha of wetlands, including rice paddies, and encompasses a 1000 ha protected area. It has been identified by BirdLife International as an Important Bird Area (IBA) because it supports significant populations of various birds, including swan geese, bean geese, greater white-fronted geese, Oriental storks, black-faced spoonbills, white-naped cranes, red-crowned cranes, long-billed plovers and Far Eastern curlews. It is threatened by aquacultural development.
