= Tokhyon station =

Railway station in Uiju County, North Korea

Tŏkhyŏn 덕현

Korean name
- Hangul: 덕현역
- Hanja: 徳峴驛
- Revised Romanization: Deokhyeon-yeok
- McCune–Reischauer: Tŏkhyŏn-yŏk

General information
- Location: Tŏkhyŏl-lodongjagu, Ŭiju-gun, North P'yŏngan; North Korea
- Owner: Korean State Railway
- Platforms: 1
- Tracks: 4

History
- Opened: April 1971

Services
Preceding station	Korean State Railway	Following station
Chŏnggwang towards South Sinŭiju	Tŏkhyŏn Line	Terminus
Location

Tŏkhyŏn station is a railway station in Tŏkhyŏn Workers' District, Ŭiju County, North P'yŏngan Province, North Korea, on the Tŏkhyŏn Line of the Korean State Railway.

== History ==
The station, along with the rest of the Tŏkhyŏn Line, was opened by the Korean State Railway in April 1971.

== Services ==
The station is served by commuter trains between here and Sinŭiju.
