= Yomju station =

Railway station in Yomju County, North Korea

Coordinates: 39°53′41″N 124°36′08″E

Yŏmju 염주

Korean name
- Hangul: 염주역
- Hanja: 鹽州驛
- Revised Romanization: Yeomju-yeok
- McCune–Reischauer: Yŏmju-yŏk

General information
- Location: Yŏmju-ŭp, Yŏmju County, North P'yŏngan Province; North Korea
- Owner: Korean State Railway

History
- Opened: 5 November 1905

Services
Preceding station	Korean State Railway	Following station
Naejung towards Dandong (China)	P'yŏngŭi Line	Tongrim towards P'yŏngyang
Ryangch'aek towards South Sinŭiju	Paengma Line	Terminus
Location

Yŏmju station is a railway station in Yŏmju-ŭp, Yŏmju County, North P'yŏngan Province, North Korea. It is the junction point of the P'yŏngŭi and Paengma lines of the Korean State Railway.

== History ==
The station was opened, along with the rest of this section of the Kyŏngŭi Line, on 5 November 1905.

After the bridge across the Yalu River was opened on 1 November 1911, connecting Sinŭiju to Dandong, China, Yŏmju station became a stop for international trains to and from Manchuria. It is still a stopping point for international trains between P'yŏngyang and Beijing.

When the Kyŏngŭi line was opened, the mainline followed the route of the current Paengma Line; after the nationalisation of the railways in 1945, the Yŏmju–Ryongch'ŏn–Namsinŭiju line was reclassified as the mainline of the P'yŏngŭi line, while the line via Paengma was designated a secondary line.
