= Ongjin County, South Hwanghae =

Coordinates: 37.9306°N 125.3572°E

Ongjin County 옹진군
- County

Korean transcription(s)
  - Hanja: 甕津郡
  - McCune-Reischauer: Ongjin-gun
  - Revised Romanization: Ongjin-gun
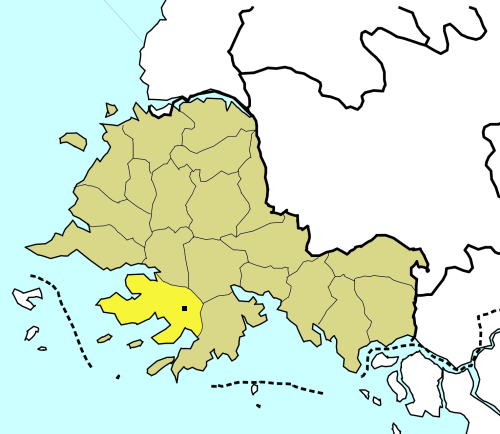
- Country: North Korea
- Province: South Hwanghae Province

Area
  - Total: 649.5 km^{2} (250.8 sq mi)

Population (2008)
  - Total: 152,878
  - Density: 235.4/km^{2} (609.6/sq mi)

Ongjin County (Korean: 옹진군) is a county in southern South Hwanghae Province, North Korea. It is located on the Ongjin Peninsula, which projects into the Yellow Sea.

== History ==
The Ongjin Peninsula lies below the 38th parallel, and was therefore in the Southern zone, which became the Republic of Korea. However, the Ongjin Peninsula was isolated from other southern territories, and therefore difficult to defend. Some of the earliest fighting in the Korean War came here as Northern forces took the Ongjin Peninsula. The Armistice Line at the end of the Korean War left Ongjin County in North Korea.

The Five West Sea Islands were put under Ongjin County of South Korea since the Armistice.

== Geography ==
Ongjin County is on the Ongjin Peninsula, with the Yellow Sea to the south and west. The Ongjin Peninsula is further divided into the Kangryŏng Peninsula, the Tongnam Peninsula, and the Ryongch'ŏn Peninsula. Geologically, Ongjin County is composed of coastal Lias. The Ongjin Plain, Kangryŏng Bay, Hwasan Bay, and Taedong Bay are all located here, as is the Ongjin Bay Important Bird Area. The climate is very mild.

Ongjin County includes three large islands. a Yonghodo (용호도) sits in the entrance to Kangryŏng Bay, Ch'angrindo (창린도) is outside the entrance to Ongjin Bay, and Kirindo (기린도) lies south of the western end of the Ongjin Peninsula.

== Administrative divisions ==
Ongjin county is divided into 1 ŭp (town), 3 rodongjagu (workers' districts) and 24 ri (villages)

- Ongjin-ŭp
- Kugong-rodongjagu
- Namhae-rodongjagu
- Ongjil-lodongjagu
- Changsong-ri
- Chejang-ri
- Chinhae-ri
- Chŏnsal-li
- Ch'angrindo-ri
- Haebang-ri
- Kirindo-ri
- Kukpong-ri
- Kurang-ri
- Manjil-li
- Pon'yŏng-ri
- Raengjŏng-ri
- Ripsŏng-ri
- Roho-ri
- Ryonghodo-ri
- Simsal-li
- Sŏhae-ri
- Songwŏl-li
- Sŏnp'ung-ri
- Sudae-ri
- Taegi-ri
- Ŭndong-ri
- Yongbong-ri
- Yongch'ŏl-li

== Economy ==
Rice is the major crop. Wheat, corn, beans, sweet potatoes, and cotton are also grown. The area was once heavily forested, but not much forest land remains. The nearby meeting of warm and cold currents make this a centre of the fishing industry. Gold, silica sand, and marble are also mined. The Ongjin Hot Springs are a popular tourist destination.

== Transportation ==
Ongjin county is served by the Ongjin Line of the Korean State Railway.

== See also ==
- Administrative divisions of North Korea
- Geography of North Korea
