= Battle of Seoul =

The five battles of the Korean War fought in and around the city of Seoul are known as the Battle of Seoul:

- First Battle of Seoul – North Korean forces capture Seoul on June 28, 1950
- Second Battle of Seoul – United Nations forces capture Seoul from the North Koreans in September 1950, following the Battle of Inchon
- Third Battle of Seoul – The Chinese People's Volunteer Army capture Seoul in January 1951
- Fourth Battle of Seoul – United Nations forces capture Seoul for the second time during Operation Ripper in March 1951.
- Fifth Battle of Seoul – The Chinese People's Volunteer Army fail to recapture Seoul during the Chinese Spring Offensive in April 1951.
