= Paengma Line =

Railway line in North Korea

Overview
- Native name: 백마선(白馬線)
- Status: Operational
- Owner: Temporary Military Railway (1905–1906); National Railway (1906–1909); Korea Railway (1909–1910); Chosen Government Railway (1910–1917); South Manchuria Railway (1917–1925); Chosen Government Railway (1925–1945); Korean State Railway (since 1945)
- Locale: North P'yŏngan
- Termini: Yŏmju; South Sinŭiju
- Stations: 7

Service
- Type: Heavy rail, Regional rail

History
- Opened: 28 April 1905; 1 April 1908 (Passenger service)

Technical
- Line length: 39.6 km (24.6 mi)
- Number of tracks: Single track
- Track gauge: 1,435 mm (4 ft 8 1/2 in) standard gauge
- Minimum radius: 400 m (1,300 ft)
- Maximum incline: 13‰
Route map
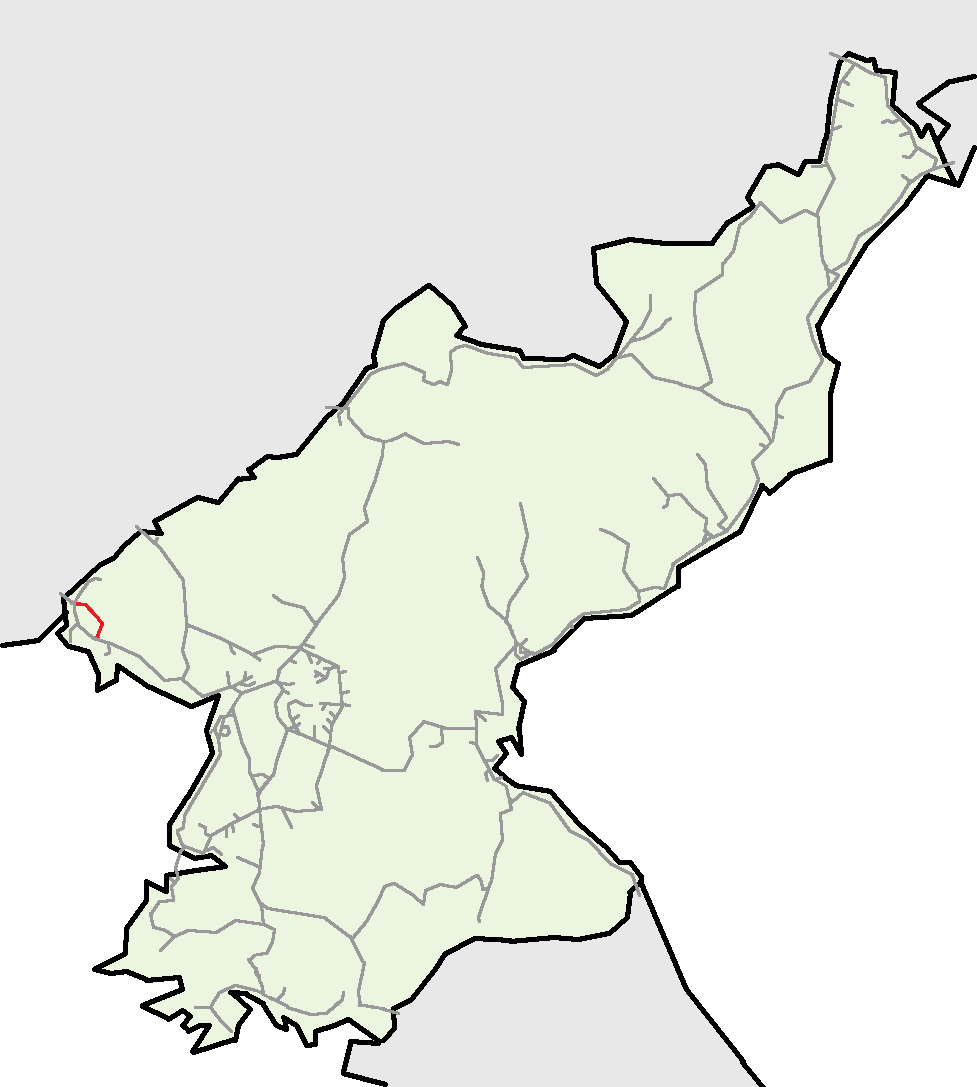

- Paengma Line
- Hangul: 백마선
- Hanja: 白馬線
- RR: Baengmaseon
- MR: Paengmasŏn

The Paengma Line is a non-electrified standard-gauge secondary line of the Korean State Railway in North P'yŏngan Province, North Korea, running from Yŏmju on the P'yŏngŭi Line to South Sinŭiju, likewise on the P'yŏngui Line.

== Description ==
The ruling grade of the line is 13‰, and the minimum curve radius is 400 m (1,300 ft). There are 26 bridges with a total length of 1,363 m (4,472 ft), and two tunnels with a total length of 803 m (2,635 ft).

== History ==
For the original line's history and other information prior to 1945, see Gyeongui Line (1904–1945).

The Namsi (now Yŏmju)–South Sinŭiju stretch of railway via Paengma was opened on 28 April 1905 by the Temporary Military Railway as part of the mainline of the Kyŏngŭi Line from Kyŏngsŏng (Seoul) to Sinŭiju. On 16 October 1943, South Sinŭiju Station became a connecting station with the Sinŭiju–Yangsi–Namsi Yangsi Line, which the Chosen Government Railway had taken over from the privately owned Tasado Railway on 1 April of that year.

After the establishment of the DPRK and the nationalisation of its railways to create the Korean State Railway, the line from Ryongch'ŏn (formerly Yangsi) to Yŏmju (formerly Namsi) remained separate as the Yangsi Line. In 1964 the Korean State Railway decided to make the shorter Yangsi Line the mainline of the P'yŏngui Line, and the former mainline between Yŏmju and South Sinŭiju was separated, becoming the current Paengma Line.

== Services ==
There is extensive freight traffic on the line, serving the large Ponghwa Chemical Complex at Paengma and several other factories.

A pair of local trains, numbered 418/419, operate between Sinŭiju Ch'ŏngnyŏn and Yŏmju, running along this line instead of the P'yŏngŭi line. There is also a short branch from Paengma to the private Songhwa Residence.

== Route ==
A yellow background in the "Distance" box indicates that section of the line is not electrified.

Distance (km)		Station Name		Former Name		
Total	S2S	Transcribed	Chosŏn'gŭl (Hanja)	Transcribed	Chosŏn'gŭl (Hanja)	Connections
0.0	0.0	Yŏmju	염주 (鹽州)	Namsi	남시 (南市)	P'yŏngŭi Line
8.7	8.7	Ryangch'aek	량책 (良策)	Yangch'aek	양책 (良策)	
16.5	7.8	P'ihyŏn	피현 (枇峴)			
23.0	6.5	Ryonggyeri	룡계리 (龍溪里)	Yonggyeri	용계리 (龍溪里)	
25.8	2.8	Paengma	백마 (白馬)			
37.0	11.2	Sŏkha	석하 (石下)			
39.6	2.6	South Sinŭiju (Namsinŭiju)	남신의주 (南新義州)			P'yŏngŭi Line, Tŏkhyŏn Line
