= Namsinuiju station =

Railway station in North Korea

South Sinŭiju

Korean name
- Hangul: 남신의주역
- Hanja: 南新義州驛
- RR: Namsinuiju-yeok
- MR: Namsinŭiju-yŏk

General information
- Location: Ryŏnsang 2-dong, Sinŭiju, North P'yŏngan; North Korea
- Coordinates: 40°04′15″N 124°26′04″E
- Owner: Korean State Railway

History
- Opened: 1 October 1938 (as interlocking)
- Rebuilt: 16 October 1943 (as station)
- Original company: Tasado Railway

Services
| Preceding station | Korean State Railway | Following station |
|---|---|---|
| Sinŭiju Ch'ŏngnyŏn towards Dandong (China) | P'yŏngŭi Line | Ragwŏn towards P'yŏngyang |
| Terminus | Paengma Line | Sŏkha towards Yŏmju |
| Terminus | Tŏkhyŏn Line | Chŏngmulli towards Tŏkhyŏn |
Location

Namsinŭiju station is a railway station in Ryŏnsang 2-dong, Sinŭiju, North P'yŏngan Province, North Korea. It is the junction point of three lines of the Korean State Railway - the P'yŏngŭi, Paengma and Tŏkhyŏn lines.

== History ==
Opened on 1 October 1938 as Namsinŭiju interlocking, it was reclassified as a station on 16 October 1943 and renamed Namsinŭiju station.
