= Tasado Line =

Railway line in North Korea

Overview
- Native name: 다사도선(多獅島線)
- Status: Operational
- Owner: Tasado Railway (1939–1945); Korean State Railway (since 1945)
- Locale: North P'yŏngan
- Termini: Ryongch'ŏn; Tasado Port
- Stations: 6

Service
- Type: Heavy rail, Regional rail Passenger/Freight

History
- Opened: 31 October 1939

Technical
- Line length: 24.1 km (15.0 mi)
- Number of tracks: Single track
- Track gauge: 1,435 mm (4 ft 8 1/2 in) standard gauge
- Minimum radius: 250 m (820 ft)
- Maximum incline: 12‰
Route map
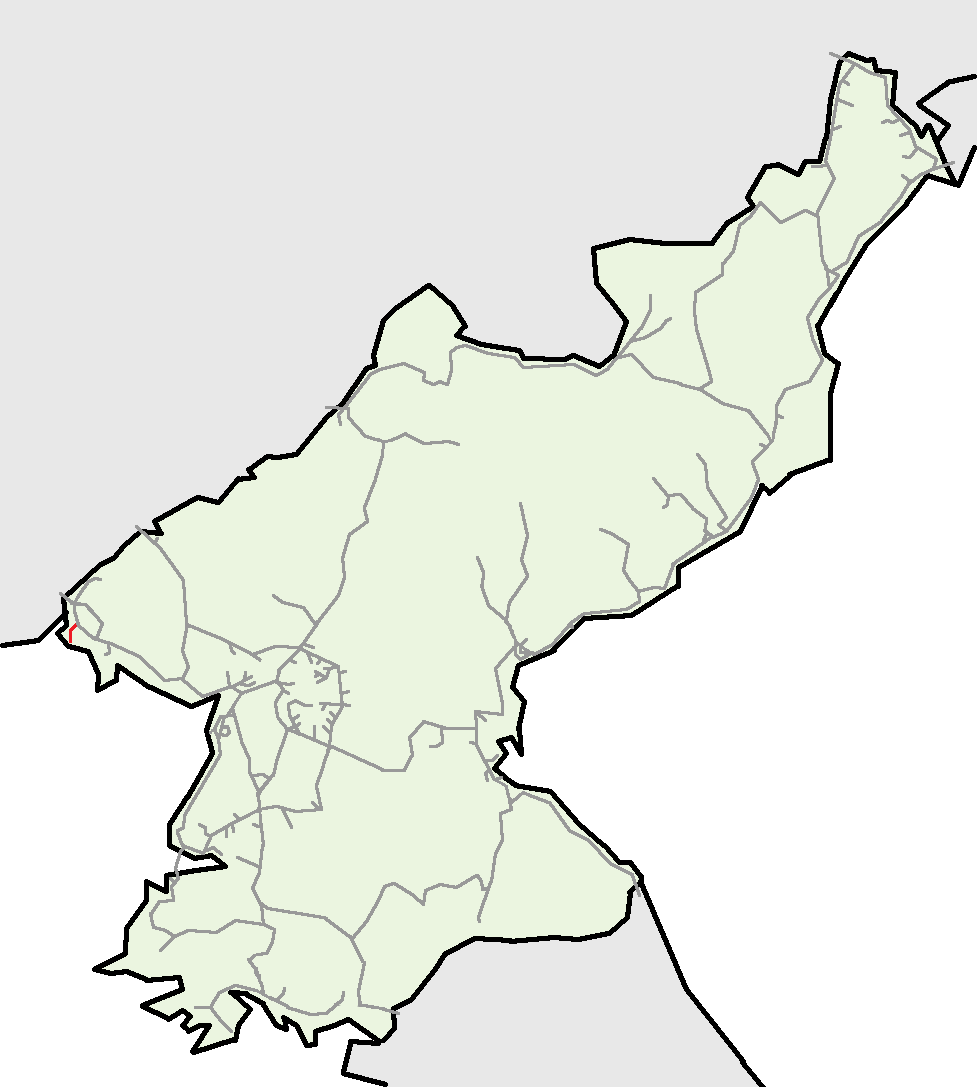

- Tasado Line
- Hangul: 다사도선
- Hanja: 多獅島線
- RR: Dasadoseon
- MR: Tasadosŏn

The Tasado Line is a non-electrified standard-gauge secondary line of the Korean State Railway in North P'yŏngan Province, North Korea, running from Ryongch'ŏn on the P'yŏngŭi Line to Tasado Port.

Running through gentle territory, the Tasado Line's ruling grade is 12‰, the minimum curve radius is 250 m (820 ft), and there are five bridges with a total length of 81 m (266 ft).

== History ==
The Tasado Line was opened by the Tasado Railway on 31 October 1939, as a 39.5 km (24.5 mi) line from Sinŭiju to Tasado Port via Yangsi, to provide the Oji Paper Company's plant in Sinŭiju (today the Sinŭiju Chemical Fibre Complex a means of shipping its products out via the port at Tasado, as the Yalu River freezes in winter. The Sinŭiju–Yangsi section of the line was transferred to the Chosen Government Railway on 1 April 1943 as the Yangsi Line.

After the partition of Korea the line was within the territory of the DPRK; Yangsi Station was given its current name, Ryongch'ŏn Station some time after the partition. The line suffered considerable damage during the Korean War, including the destruction of the bridge west of Pukchung; this was rebuilt in September 1971, restoring service on the entirety of the line.

== Services ==
At Pukchung the line serves the Pukchung Machine Complex factory, while beyond the station at the town of Tasado, it continues on to serve the Korean People's Navy base at Tasado Port. Coal, metal and metal products, fertilisers, agricultural products and materials required at the navy base are the major commodities shipped on the line.

There are five daily return commuter trains between Ryongch'ŏn and Tasado.

== Route ==
A yellow background in the "Distance" box indicates that section of the line is not electrified.

Distance (km)		Station Name		Former Name		
Total	S2S	Transcribed	Chosŏn'gŭl (Hanja)	Transcribed	Chosŏn'gŭl (Hanja)	Connections
0.0	0.0	Ryongch'ŏn	룡천 (龍川)	Yangsi	양시 (楊市)	P'yŏngŭi Line
~~3.5~~	~~3.5~~	Pukchung	북중 (北中)			Station relocated
5.0	5.0	Pukchung	북중 (北中)			
10.5	7.0	Ryongamp'o	룡암포 (龍岩浦)			
16.8	3.6	Sinjŏngri	신정리 (信井里)			
20.5	3.7	Tasado	다사도 (多獅島)			
24.1	3.6	Tasadohang (Tasado Port)	다사도항 (多獅島港)			Kwakkot Ch'oe Harbour KPN base
