= Ryongchon station =

Railway Station in North Korea

Coordinates: 39.9860°N 124.4578°E

Ryongch'ŏn 룡천
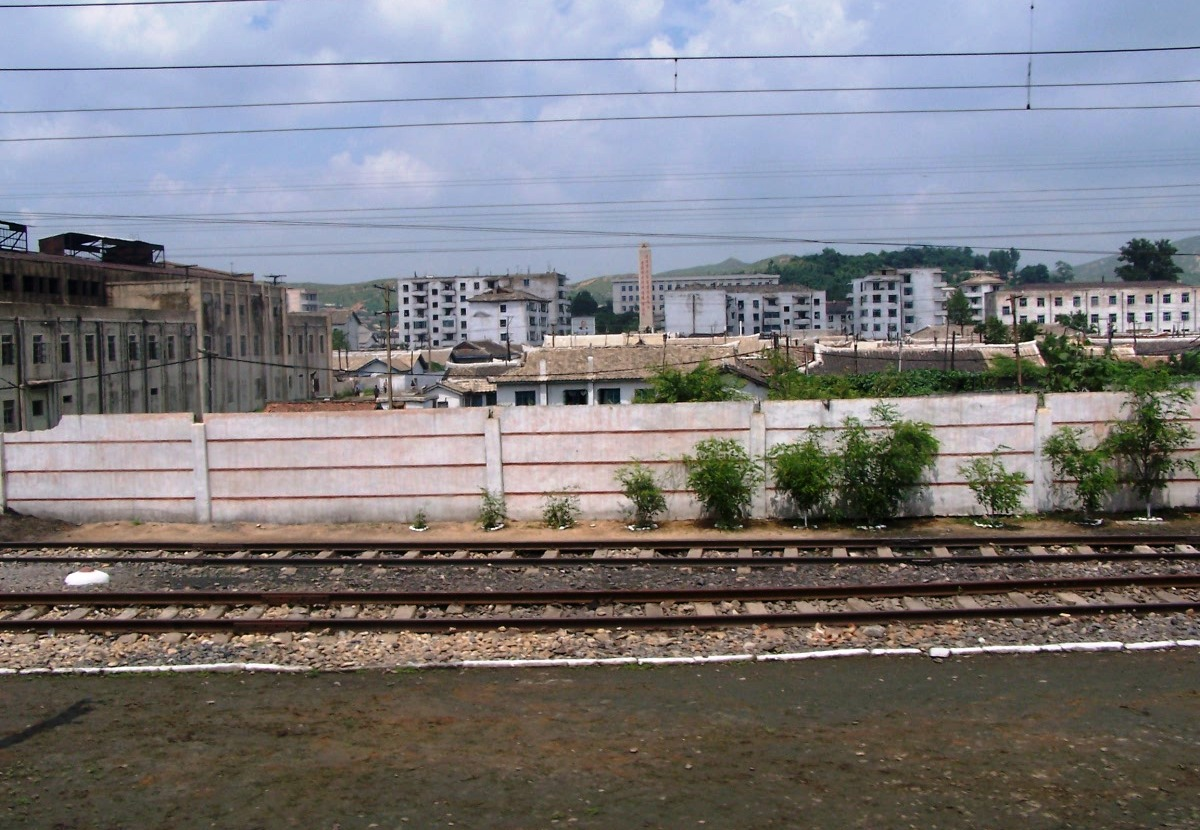

Korean name
- Hangul: 룡천역
- Hanja: 龍川驛
- Revised Romanization: Yongcheon-yeok
- McCune–Reischauer: Ryongch'ŏn-yŏk

General information
- Location: Ryongch'ŏn-ŭp, Ryongch'ŏn-gun, North P'yŏngan; North Korea
- Owner: Korean State Railway
- Platforms: 2 (1 island)
- Tracks: 7

History
- Opened: 31 October 1939
- Original company: Tasado Railway

Services
| Preceding station | Korean State Railway | Following station |
|---|---|---|
| Ragwŏn towards Dandong (China) | P'yŏngŭi Line | Ryongju towards P'yŏngyang |
| Pukchung towards Tasadohang | Tasado Line | Terminus |
Location

Ryongch'ŏn station is a railway station in Ryongch'ŏn-ŭp, Ryongch'ŏn County, North P'yŏngan Province, North Korea. It is the junction point of the P'yŏngŭi and Tasado lines of the Korean State Railway.

== History ==
The station, originally called Yangsi station, was opened on 31 October 1939 by the Tasado Railway, along with the rest of the Tasado Line from Sinŭiju to Tasado Port. The Sinŭiju–Yangsi section of the line was transferred to the Chosen Government Railway as the Yangsi Line on 1 April 1943, and the station received its current name in July 1945.

The Ryongch'ŏn disaster was a major accident that occurred at Ryongch'ŏn station on 22 April 2004, when a train carrying flammable cargo exploded.

== Services ==
There are five daily return commuter trains between Ryongch'ŏn and Tasado stations.
