= Ryongchon County =

Ryongch'ŏn County 룡천군
- County

Korean transcription(s)
  - Chosŏn'gŭl: 룡천군 (용천군)
  - Hancha: 龍川郡
  - McCune-Reischauer: Ryongch'ŏn-gun
  - Revised Romanization: Ryongcheon-gun (Yongcheon-gun)
- Coordinates: 39°57′36″N 124°26′06″E
- Country: North Korea
- Province: North P'yŏngan
- Administrative divisions: 1 ŭp. 3 workers' districts, 19 ri

Area
  - Total: 217 km^{2} (84 sq mi)

Population (2008)
  - Total: 135,634
  - Density: 625/km^{2} (1,620/sq mi)

Ryongch'ŏn County is a kun (county) in North P'yŏngan province, North Korea, at the mouth of the Yalu River. The county seat is Ryongch'ŏn-ŭp, about 20 km (12 mi) from the border with China. The area has a reported population of 27,000 and is a centre of chemical and metalworking production.

== Administrative divisions ==
Ryongch'ŏn county is divided into 1 ŭp (town), 3 rodongjagu (workers' districts) and 19 ri (villages):

- Ryongch'ŏn-ŭp (룡천읍)
- Pukchung-rodongjagu (북중로동자구)
- Ryongamp'o-rodongjagu (룡암포로동자구)
- Sinhŭng-rodongjagu (진흥로동자구)
- Changsal-li (장산리)
- Hwahŭng-ri (학흥리)
- Inhŭng-ri (인흥리)
- Kyŏn'il-li (견일리)
- Ohŭng-ri (오흥리)
- Ryongsong-ri (룡송리)
- Ryongyŏl-li (룡연리)
- Sandu-ri (산두리)
- Sibung-ri (시북리)
- Sin'am-ri (신암리)
- Sŏsŏng-ri (서석리)
- Ssanghang-ri (쌍학리)
- Ssangryong-ri (쌍룡리)
- Susŏng-ri (수성리)
- Tŏkhŭng-ri (덕흥리)
- Tŏksŭng-ri (덕승리)
- Tongha-ri (동하리)
- Tongsil-li (동신리)
- Yangsŏ-ri (양서리)

== Transport ==
The P'yŏngŭi line of the Korean State Railway, running between China and P'yŏngyang runs through Ryongchŏn and is served by several stations, including in Ryongch'ŏn-ŭp. It is the busiest line in the country, crossing the border in nearby Sinŭiju, North Korea to Dandong, China.

=== Ryongch'ŏn disaster ===
On 22 April 2004, the town suffered a major disaster when a flammable cargo exploded at the town's railway station, causing many deaths and much destruction, known as the Ryongch'ŏn disaster.

== Protests ==
In February 2011, the area and others in North P'yŏngan had rare protests, of a few score of people, calling for adequate provision of rice and power. At the time, news of the Arab Spring was spreading via Chinese TV channels and phone calls with defectors.

== See also ==
- Geography of North Korea
