= Changbai–Hyesan International Bridge =

China–North Korea bridge

Coordinates: 41.4069°N 128.1750°E

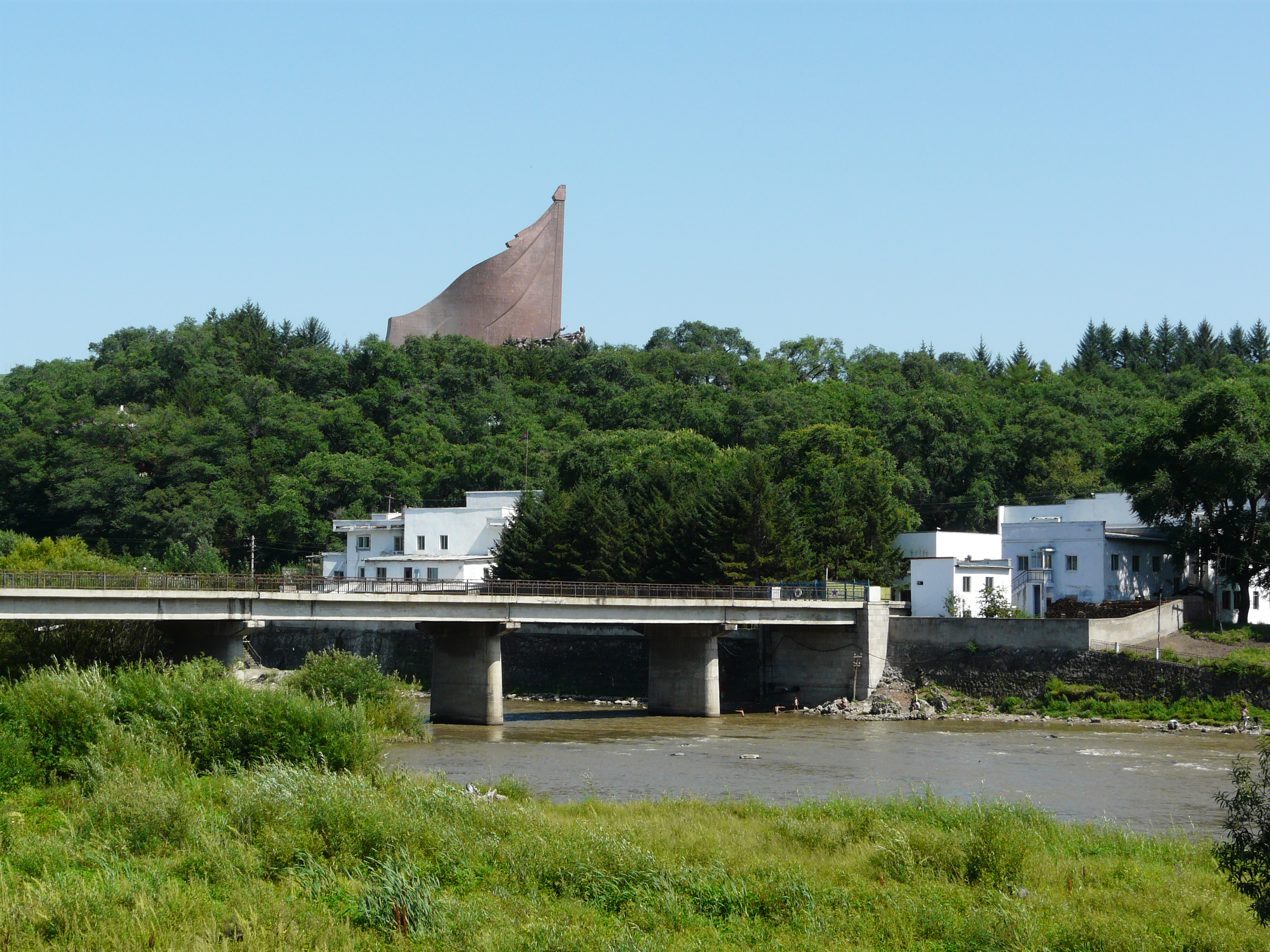
Changbai–Hyesan International Bridge

The Changbai–Hyesan International Bridge (Chinese: 长惠国际大桥; Korean: 장혜국제대교) is a bridge over the Yalu River, connecting Changbai Korean Autonomous County of Changbai City, Jilin Province, China, with Hyesan City of Ryanggang Province, North Korea. It was initially built in 1936 by the Japanese, and, after several destructions and rebuildings, was renewed in 1985 as the present-day bridge, which is 148 meters (486 ft) long and 9 meters (30 ft) wide. Since 1992, one-day, five-day and ten-day tours have been conducted between China and North Korea.

== See also ==
- Sino–Korean Friendship Bridge and New Yalu River Bridge (Dandong City)
- Ji'an Yalu River Border Railway Bridge
- Linjiang Yalu River Bridge
- Tumen Border Bridge (Tumen City)
- Tumen River Bridge (Hunchun City)
- Changbai Korean Autonomous County
- List of international bridges
