= Linjiang Yalu River Bridge =

Bridge between China and North Korea

Coordinates: 41.7926°N 126.8964°E

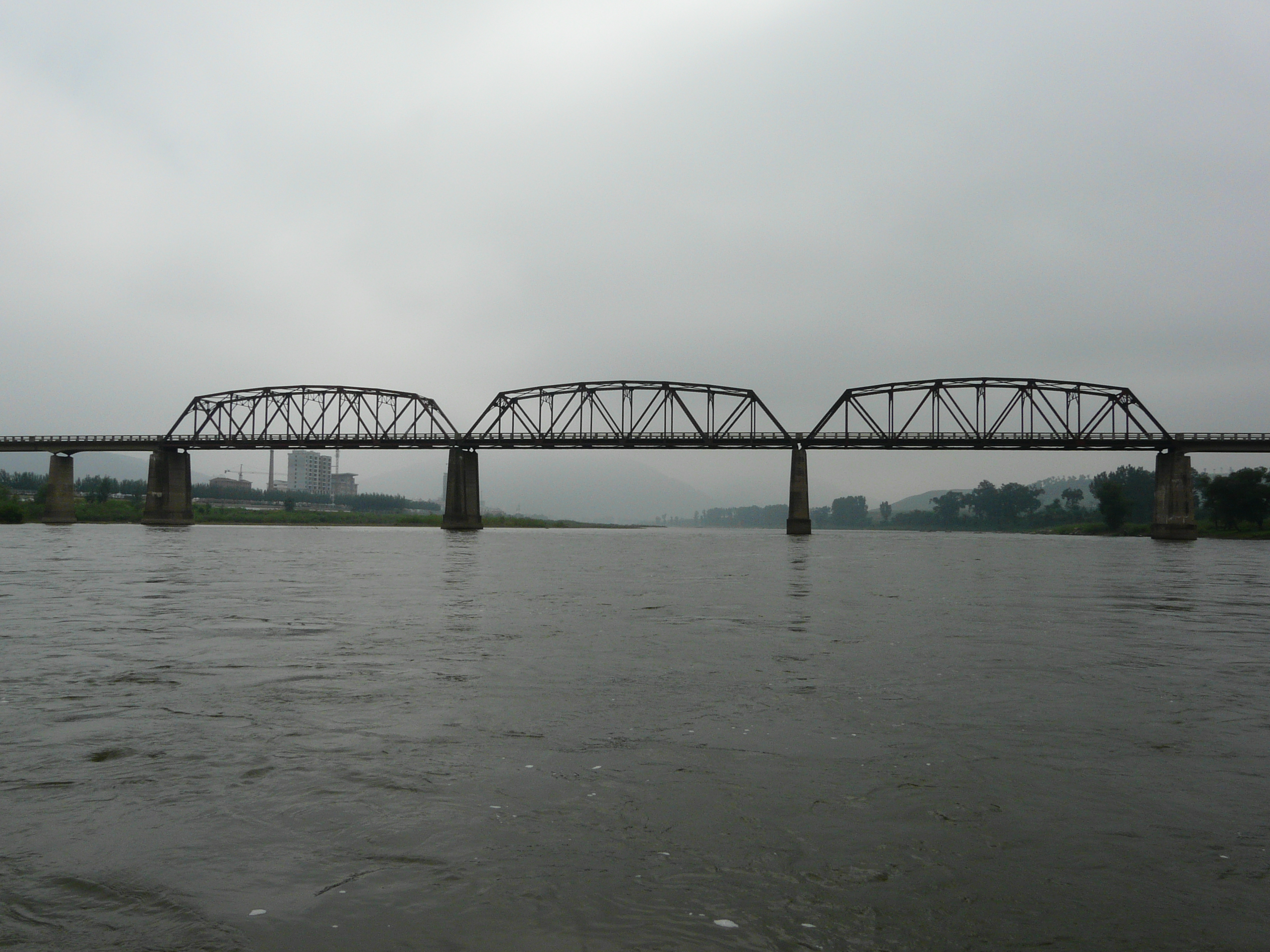
The Linjiang Yalu River Bridge

The Linjiang Yalu River Bridge (Chinese: 临江国际大桥) is a bridge over the Yalu River, connecting Linjiang City, Jilin Province, China, with Chunggang County, Chagang Province, North Korea. It was built by the Japanese in 1938 and Linjiang Border Post is located there. A little downstream from the bridge is Yunfeng Dam.

During the Korean War, it was one of the border posts from which the Chinese People's Volunteer Army entered North Korea.

== See also ==
- Sino–Korean Friendship Bridge and New Yalu River Bridge (Dandong)
- Ji'an Yalu River Border Railway Bridge
- Changbai-Hyesan International Bridge
- Tumen Border Bridge (Tumen City)
- Tumen River Bridge (Hunchun)
- List of international bridges
