= Sino-Korean Friendship Bridge =

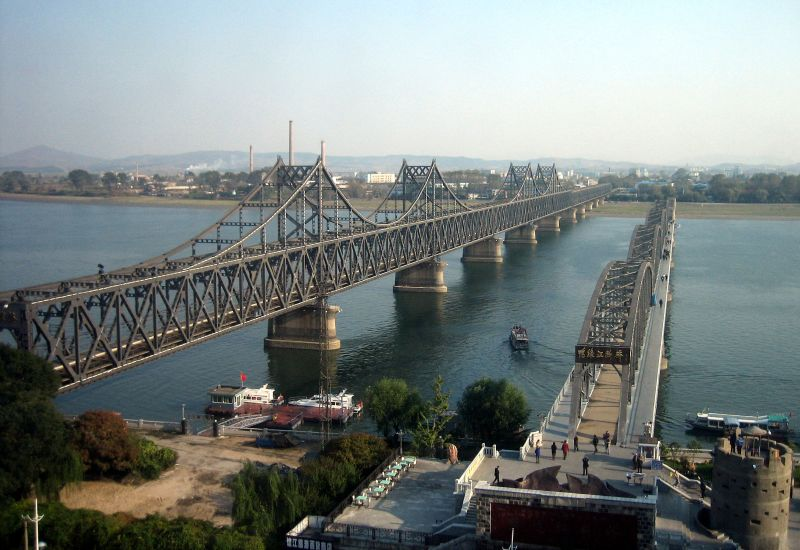
- The bridge (on left side) viewed from Dandong, China. The Yalu River Broken Bridge is to its right.
- Coordinates: 40°6′54″N 124°23′33″E
- Carries: One lane of road and rail traffic
- Crosses: Yalu River, China–North Korea border
- Locale: Dandong, Liaoning, China; Sinŭiju, North P'yŏngan, North Korea
- Official name: 中朝友谊桥 (Chinese); 조중친선다리 (Korean)
- Other name: Sino-Korean or China–Korea Friendship Bridge

Characteristics
- Material: Steel
- Total length: 940.8 m (3,087 ft)

History
- Construction start: April of 1937
- Construction end: May of 1943

Location
- Interactive map of Sino-Korean Friendship Bridge

Sino-Korean Friendship Bridge
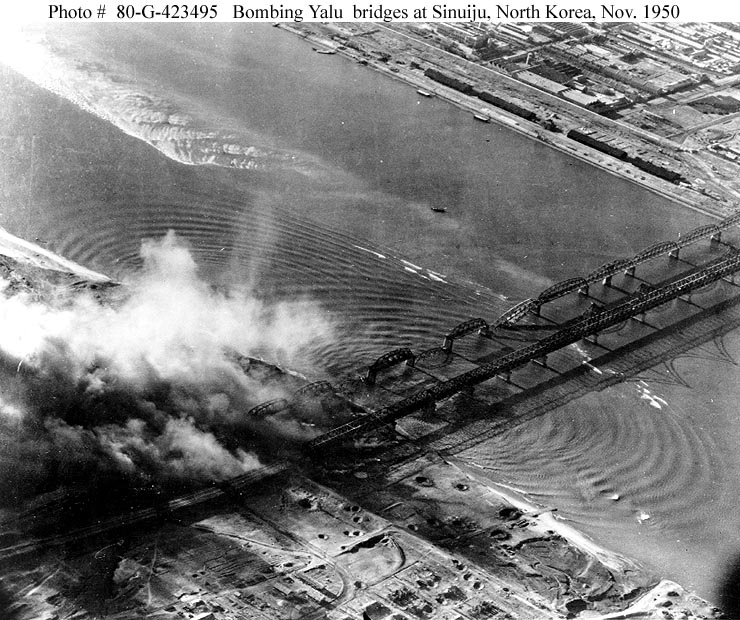
- Aerial photograph taken in November of 1950 during air attacks by US Air Force bombers, with damage to the two Amnok River bridges showing.

Chinese name
- Simplified Chinese: 中朝友谊桥
- Traditional Chinese: 中朝友誼橋
Transcriptions
Standard Mandarin
- Hanyu Pinyin: Zhōng Cháo yǒuyì qiáo
- Wade–Giles: Chung Ch'ao yu-i ch'iao
- IPA: [ʈʂʊ́ŋ ʈʂʰǎʊ jòʊî tɕʰjǎʊ]
Yue: Cantonese
- Jyutping: Zung1 ciu4 jau5 ji6 kiu4
- IPA: [tsʊ́ŋ.tɕʰȉːu jɐ̬ujìː kʰȉːu]

Korean name
- Chosŏn'gŭl: 조중친선다리
- Hancha: 朝中親善다리
Transcriptions
- Revised Romanization: Jo-Jung chinseon dari
- McCune–Reischauer: Cho-Chung chinsŏn tari

The Sino-Korean Friendship Bridge, or China–North Korea Friendship Bridge, is a bridge across the Yalu or Amnok River on the China–North Korea border. It connects the cities of Dandong in China and Sinuiju of North Korea, by railway and roadway but pedestrians are not allowed to cross between either side. The bridge serves as one of the few ways to enter or leave North Korea.

It was renamed to its current name from the Yalu (Amnok) River Bridge in 1990. The bridge was constructed by the Imperial Japanese Army (IJA) between April 1937 and May 1943 during its occupation of Korea and its puppet state of Manchukuo (now northeast China).

Further downstream, the New Yalu River Bridge opened in 2026. The new bridge is intended to serve cargo, and passenger and rail traffic will continue to use the old bridge.

== Background and history ==
Approximately 100 m (110 yd) downstream of this bridge are the remains of an older bridge, now known as the Yalu River Broken Bridge, which was opened to traffic between China and Korea in October 1911. This was later supplemented with the more modern bridge, which became operational in 1943. Both bridges were attacked and bombed by American military aircraft throughout most of the Korean War. From November 1950 to February 1951, the United States Air Force (USAF) used B-29 heavy bombers and F-80 fighter-bombers to repeatedly attack and destroy the bridges in an attempt to cut off the flow of Chinese military and troop supplies to the badly weakened North Korean armed forces as well as their own forces fighting alongside them there. Despite the serious difficulties present, the bridges were repeatedly repaired (largely by China). The older bridge from 1911 was left in ruins following its destruction at the hands of the USAF (with North Korea allegedly claiming it would serve as a piece of hard evidence of the US military's destruction of the bridge) and only the newer bridge from 1943 was repaired once again and put back into use at the end of the war in 1953.

The aging structure has had to be closed several times to undergo maintenance, limiting trade between the countries. In 2015 and in 2017, the bridge was closed for structural repairs.

Operations on the bridge are monitored by outside observers speculating about the nature of China and North Korea's trade and diplomatic relationship. As of 2020, it was estimated the bridge carried more than 70% of trade related traffic between China and North Korea.

== Tourism ==
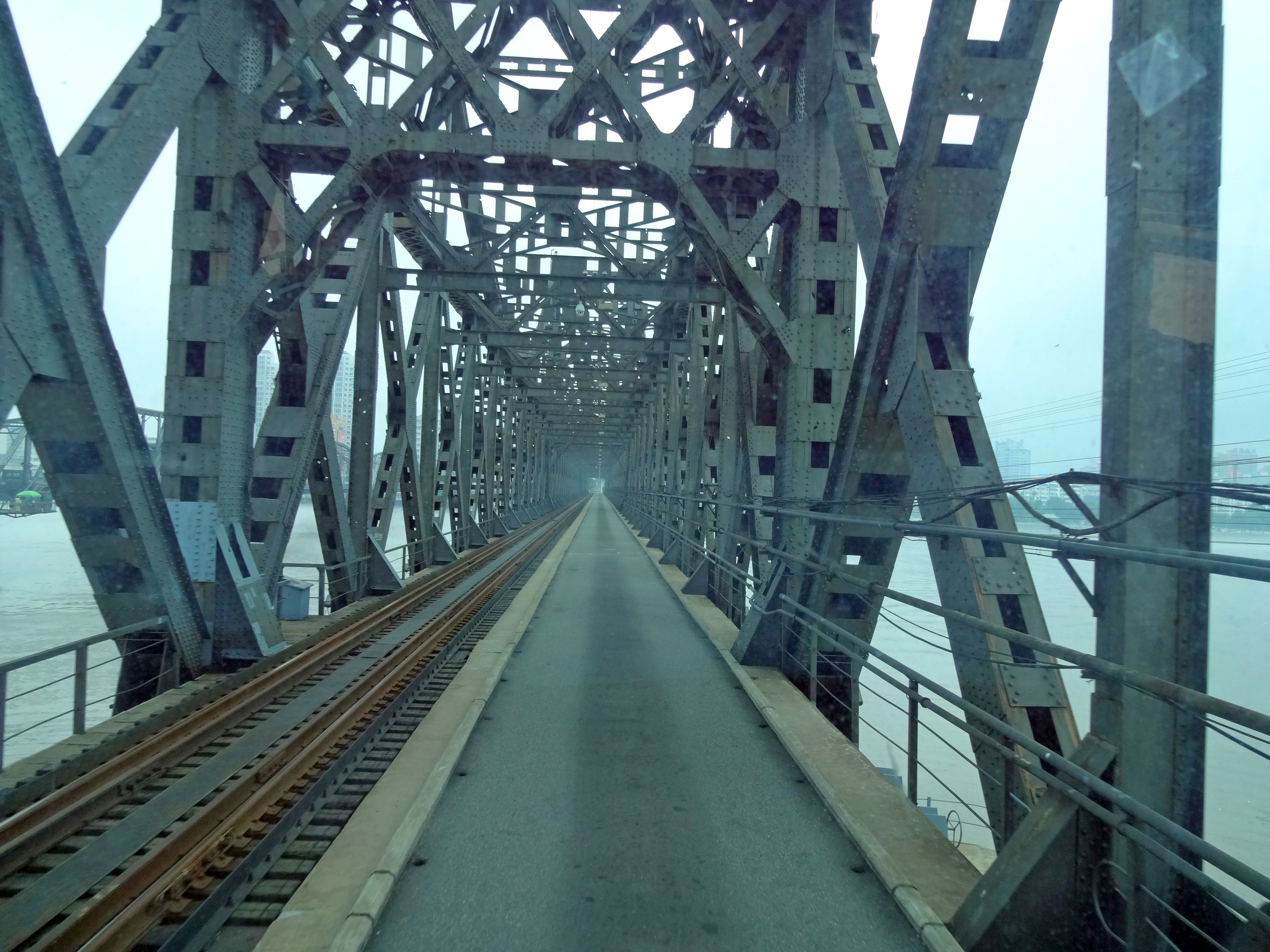
View inside the bridge in 2012, with railway and roadway but no sidewalk

The Sino-Korean Friendship Bridge and the Broken Bridge are flanked on the Chinese side by parks and promenades which make up the Yalu (Amnok) River Scenic Area. This is a major tourist attraction in China and is rated AAAA on China's national tourist scale. Tourist boats leave from the side of the bridge, allowing visitors to view both bridges and the Dandong riverfront, and pass close to the North Korean waterfront.

== See also ==
- People's Republic of China – North Korea relations
- Foreign relations of North Korea
- List of bridges in China
- Korea Russia Friendship Bridge
- Friendship Bridge
- New Yalu River Bridge
- List of international bridges
- Yakov Novichenko Bridge

Other Sino-Korean border bridges:

- Ji'an Yalu River Border Railway Bridge (Ji'an City)
- Linjiang Yalu River Bridge (Linjiang City)
- Changbai-Hyesan International Bridge (Changbai Korean Autonomous County)
- Tumen Border Bridge (Tumen City)
- Tumen River Bridge (Hunchun City)
- New Yalu River Bridge (Dandong)
