= Tumen River Bridge =

Bridge between China and North Korea

- Coordinates: 42.5682°N 130.5225°E
- Crosses: Tumen River

Location
- Interactive map of Tumen River Bridge

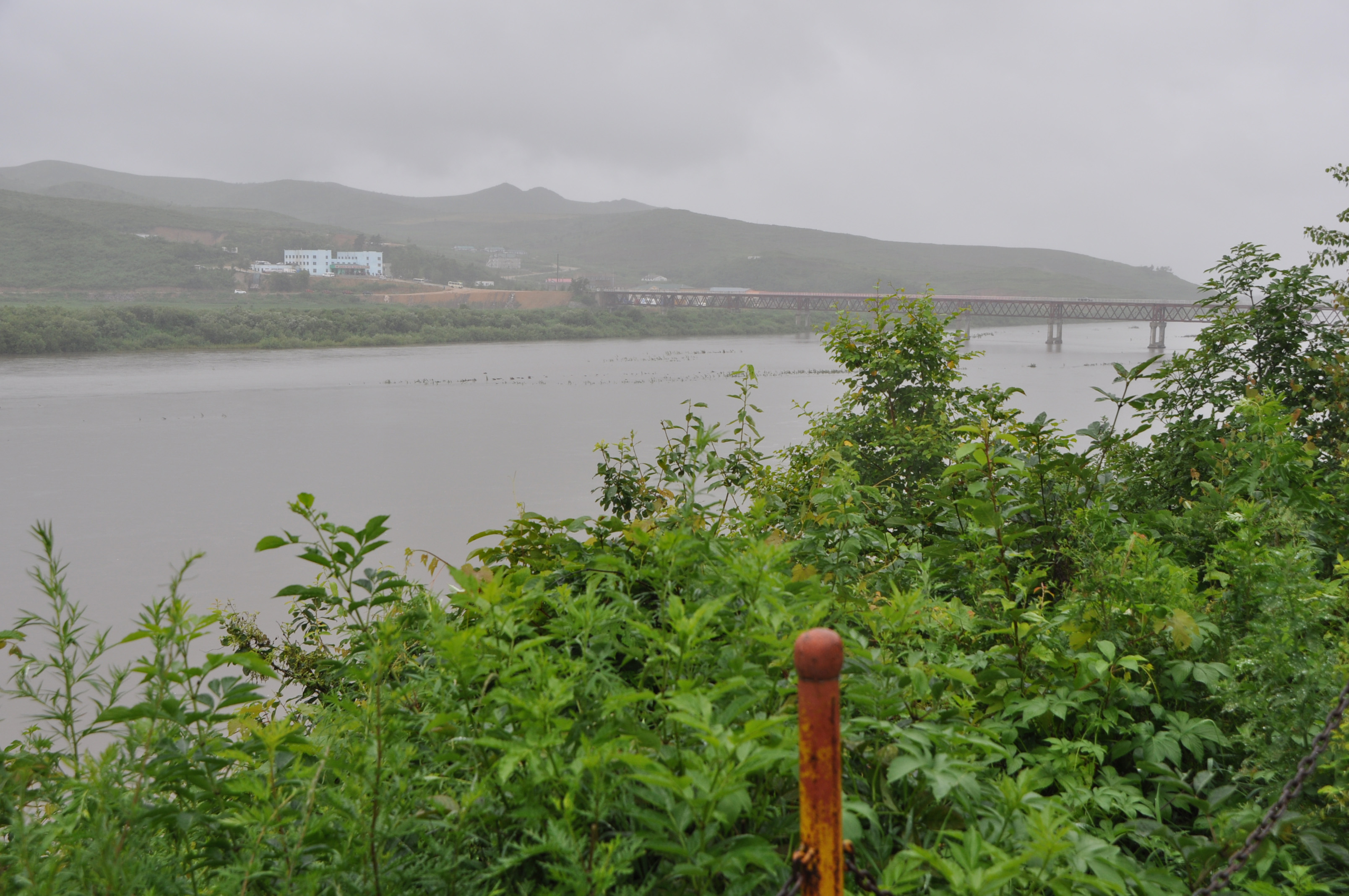
The original 1938 bridge, viewed from a roadside in China in 2012

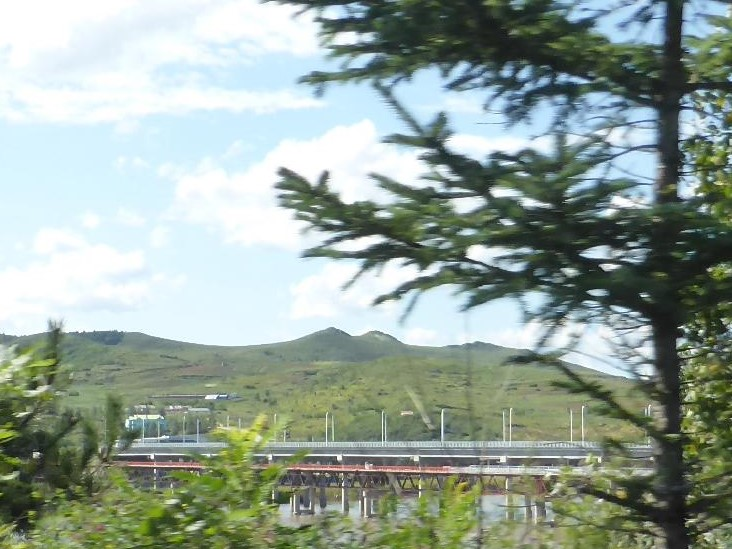
The original and new bridges, viewed from China, 2018

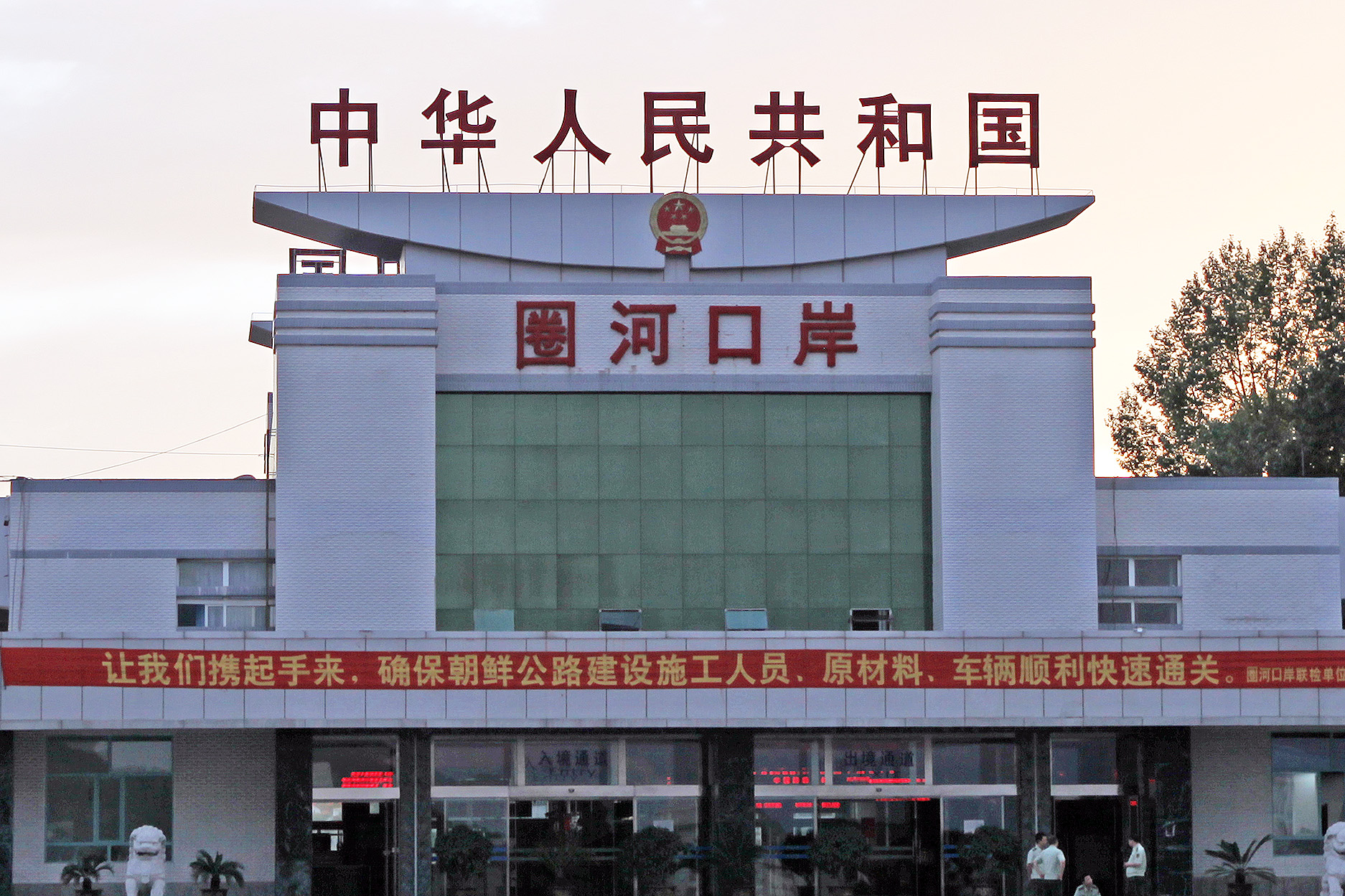
Border control point for the bridge, at Quanhe, China

The Tumen River Bridge (Chinese: 图们江大桥; Korean: 두만강대교) crosses the Tumen River between Quanhe Port, where the Quan River enters the Tumen River in Jilin Province, China, and in Rason, North Korea. It is the international link in a road route between Hunchun City in China and Wonjong-tong, Sonbong-guyok in North Korea.

== History ==
The original bridge was built in 1938 by the Japanese Empire and is 535.2 metres (1,756 ft) long and 6.6 metres (22 ft) wide. In February 1997, tourist access across the bridge was allowed.

The building of a new bridge was announced in 2014. It is 638 metres long and sits beside the original bridge. Its construction was paid for by China. An opening ceremony was held on 30 September 2016 and the bridge was expected to open to traffic on two of its four lanes on 7 October 2016.

== See also ==
- Sino–Korean Friendship Bridge and New Yalu River Bridge (Dandong City)
- Ji'an Yalu River Border Railway Bridge
- Changbai-Hyesan International Bridge
- Linjiang Yalu River Bridge
- Tumen Border Bridge (Tumen City)
- List of international bridges
