= Tumen Border Bridge =

Bridge between China and North Korea

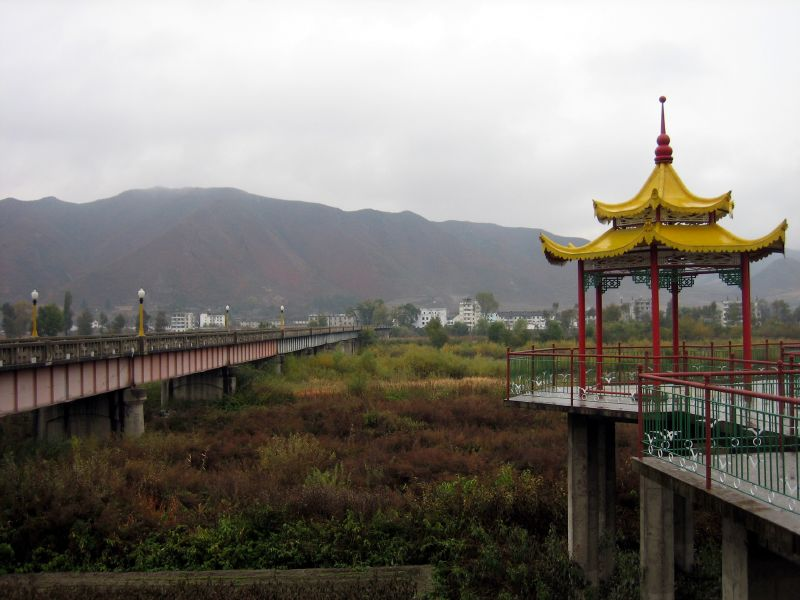
- Tumen Border Bridge in the autumn
- Coordinates: 42.9548°N 129.8502°E
- Crosses: Tumen River

Chinese name
- Simplified Chinese: 图们国境大桥
- Traditional Chinese: 圖們國境大橋
Transcriptions
Standard Mandarin
- Hanyu Pinyin: Túmen Guójìng Dàqiáo

Korean name
- Chosŏn'gŭl: 도문국경대교
Transcriptions
- Revised Romanization: Domun Gukgyeong Daegyo
- McCune–Reischauer: Tomun Gukkyŏng Daegyo

Location
- Interactive map of Tumen Border Bridge

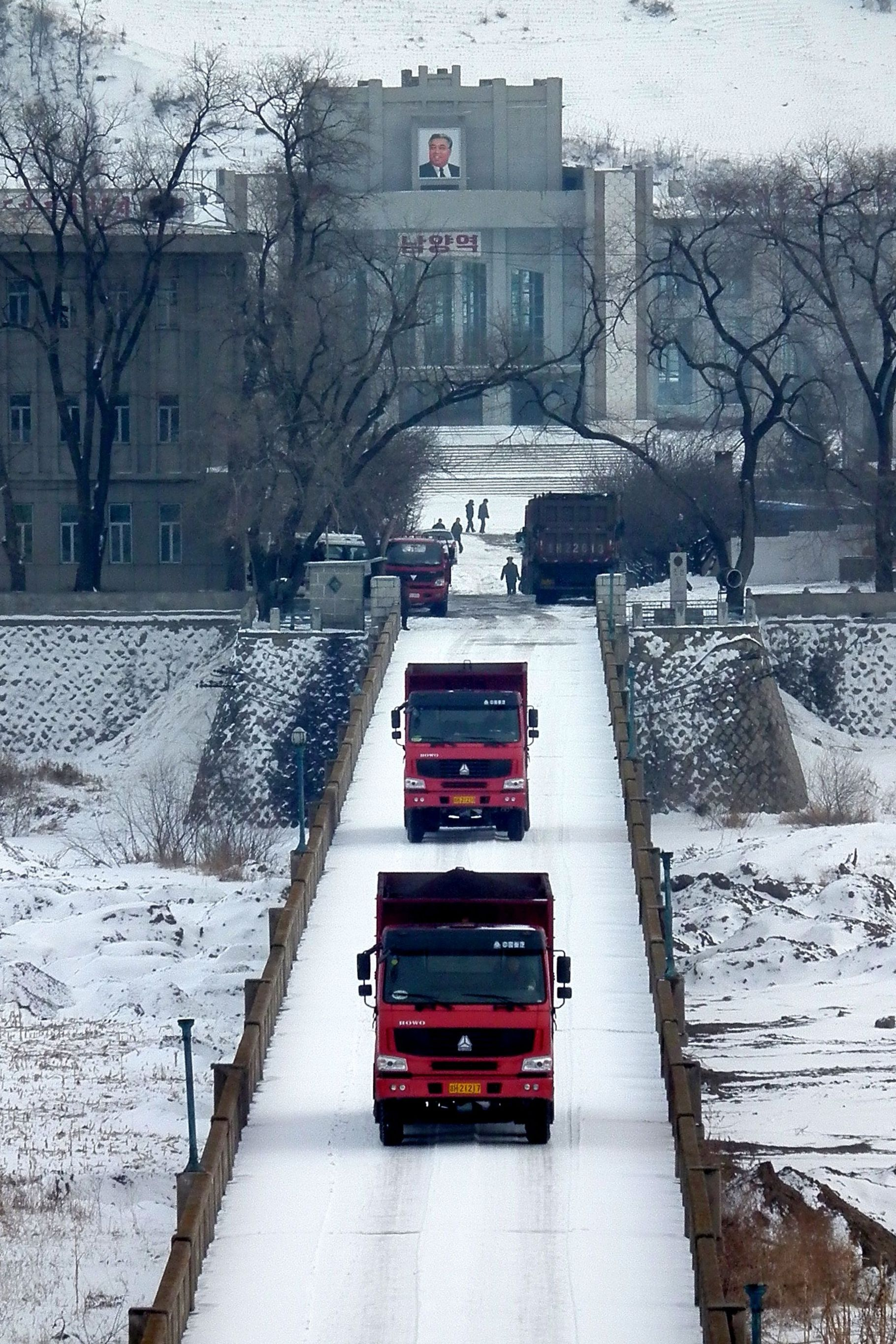
Tumen Border Bridge, from China, in the winter

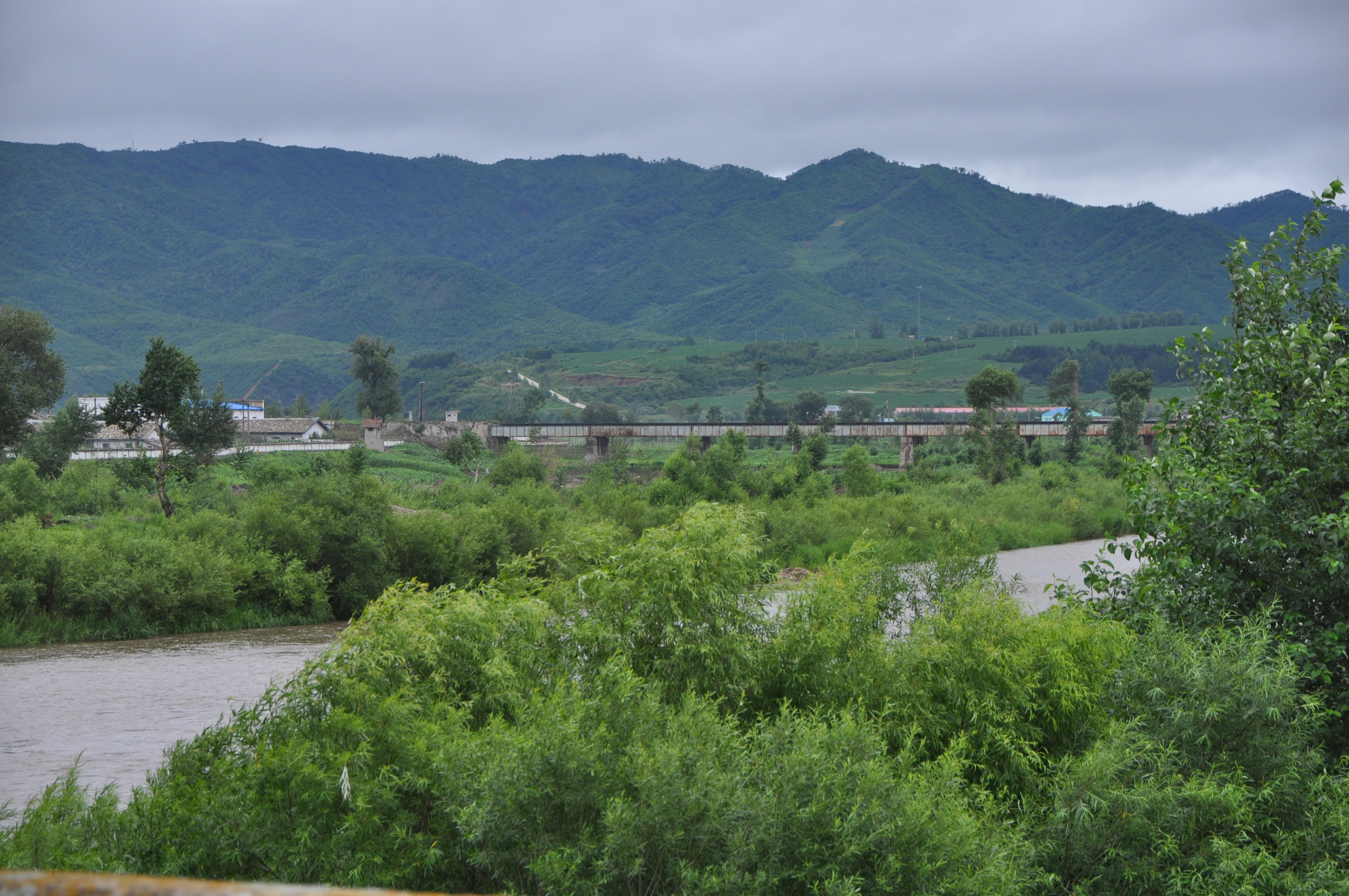
Tumen Border Railway Bridge can be seen about 200 meters upstream from Tumen Border Bridge, in summer

The Tumen Border Bridge is a road bridge over the Tumen River, connecting Tumen City, Jilin Province, China, with Namyang, Onsong County, North Hamgyong Province, North Korea.

== History ==
It was built in 1941 by the Japanese. During the Korean War, it was one of the border posts from which the Chinese People's Volunteer Army entered North Korea. A parallel, larger bridge is under construction since 2016. The new bridge was completed in 2019. In 2025, China built a symbolic gate resembling a triumphal arch in front of the bridge.

== Description ==
The bridge is 515 metres long, 6 metres high, 6 metres wide. Tumen Border Post is located there. A little upstream from the bridge is Tumen Border Railway Bridge.

== See also ==
- Sino–Korean Friendship Bridge and New Yalu River Bridge (Dandong City)
- Ji'an Yalu River Border Railway Bridge
- Changbai-Hyesan International Bridge
- Linjiang Yalu River Bridge
- Tumen River Bridge (Hunchun City)
- List of international bridges
