= Amrok River estuary Important Bird Area =

Conservation area in North Korea

Coordinates: 39°48′00″N 124°14′00″E

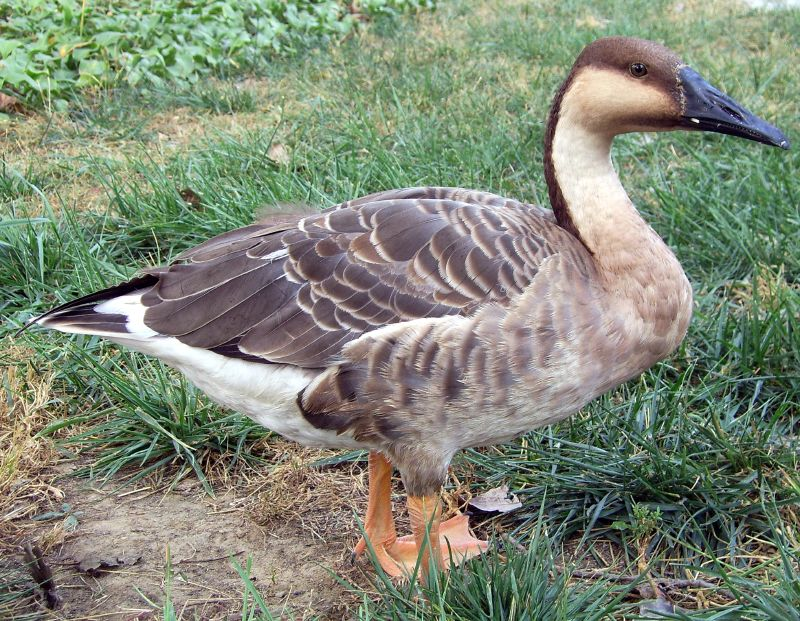
The estuary is an important wintering site for swan geese

The Amrok River estuary Important Bird Area comprises the North Korean part of the Amrok, or Yalu, estuary, with an area of 7,000 ha, abutting the border with China on the north-eastern coast of the Yellow Sea. The site has been identified by BirdLife International as an Important Bird Area (IBA) because it supports up to 20,000 waterbirds. Birds for which the site is significant include swan geese, Baikal teal, black-faced spoonbills, white-naped cranes, red-crowned cranes and Far Eastern curlews. Only 1000 ha of the site is protected in a nature reserve.
