= Xinshi Subdistrict, Linjiang =

Xinshi Subdistrict 新市街道
- Subdistrict
- Location in Jilin
- Coordinates: 41°48′24″N 126°54′27″E
- Country: People's Republic of China
- Province: Jilin
- Prefecture-level city: Baishan
- County-level city: Linjiang
- Village-level divisions: 2 residential communities 2 villages
- Elevation: 341 m (1,119 ft)
- Time zone: UTC+8 (China Standard)
- Postal code: 134600
- Area code: 0439

Xinshi Subdistrict (Chinese: 新市街道; pinyin: Xīnshì Jiēdào; lit. 'new city') is a subdistrict of Linjiang, Jilin, People's Republic of China. As of 2011, it has two residential communities (社区) and two villages under its administration.

== See also ==
- List of township-level divisions of Jilin
