= Ji'an Yalu River Border Railway Bridge =

Bridge crossing the China - North Korea border

Coordinates: 41°9′21″N 126°16′20″E

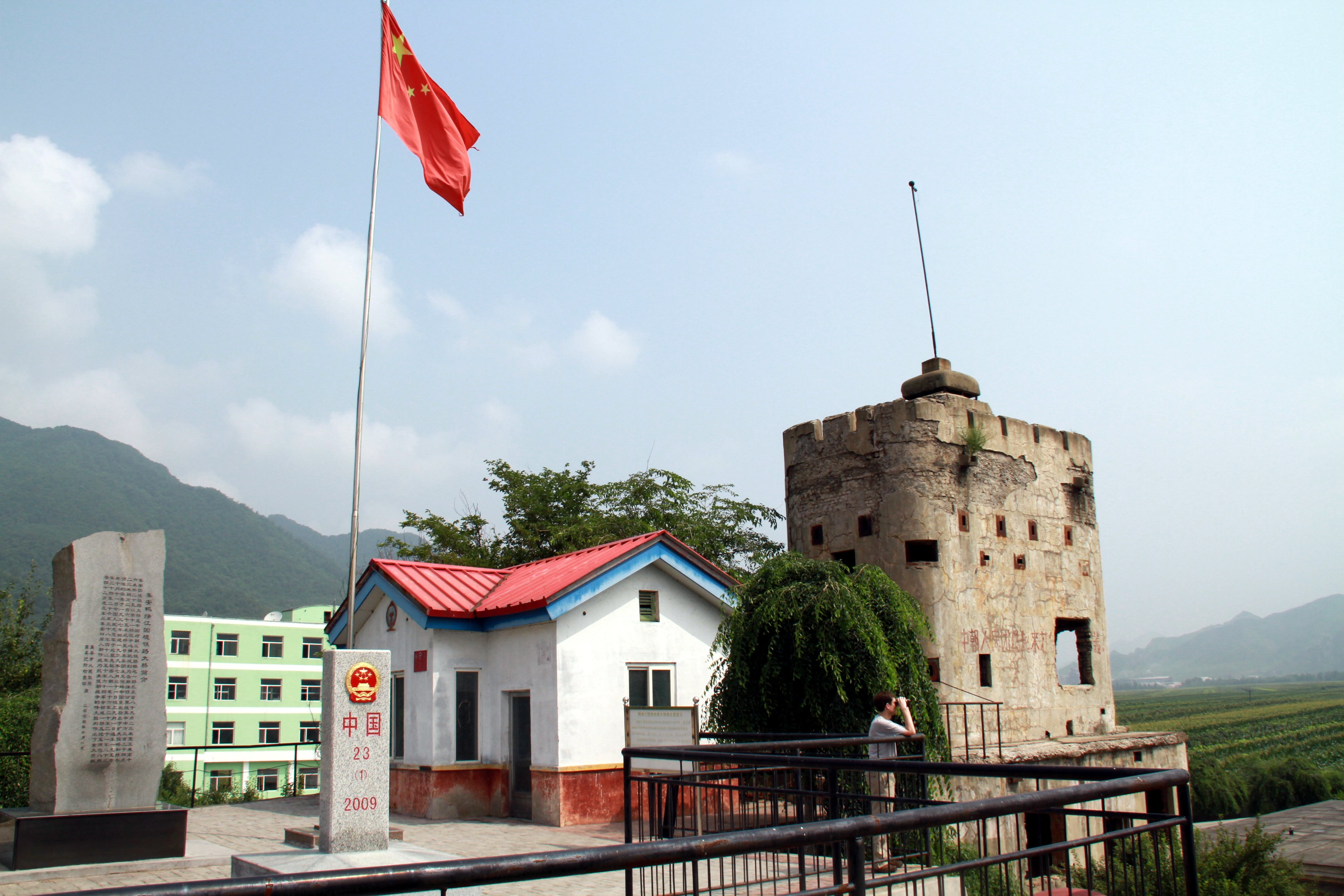
- Chinese border post at the bridge

Chinese name
- Traditional Chinese: 集安鴨綠江國境鐵路大橋
- Simplified Chinese: 集安鸭绿江国境铁路大桥
Transcriptions
Standard Mandarin
- Hanyu Pinyin: Jí'ān Yālùjiāng Guójìng Tiělù Dàqiáo
- Wade–Giles: Chi-an Ya-lu-chiang Kuo-ching T'ieh-lu Ta-ch'iao
- IPA: [tɕǐán jálûtɕjáŋ kwǒtɕîŋ tʰjèlû tâtɕʰjǎʊ]
Yue: Cantonese
- Jyutping: Zaap6 on1 aap1 luk6 gong1 gwok3 ging2 tit3 lou6 daai6 kiu4
- IPA: [tsàːpʔɔ́ːn ʔáplʊ̀kkɔ̄ːŋ kʷɔ̄ːkkɪ̌ŋ tʰɪ̄tlòu tàːikʰȉːu]

Korean name
- Chosŏn'gŭl: 집안압록강국경철도대교
- Hancha: 集安鴨綠江國境鐵道大橋
Transcriptions
- Revised Romanization: Jiban Amnokgang Gukgyeong Cheoldo Daegyo
- McCune–Reischauer: Chiban Amnokkang Kukkyŏng Ch'ŏlto Taegyo

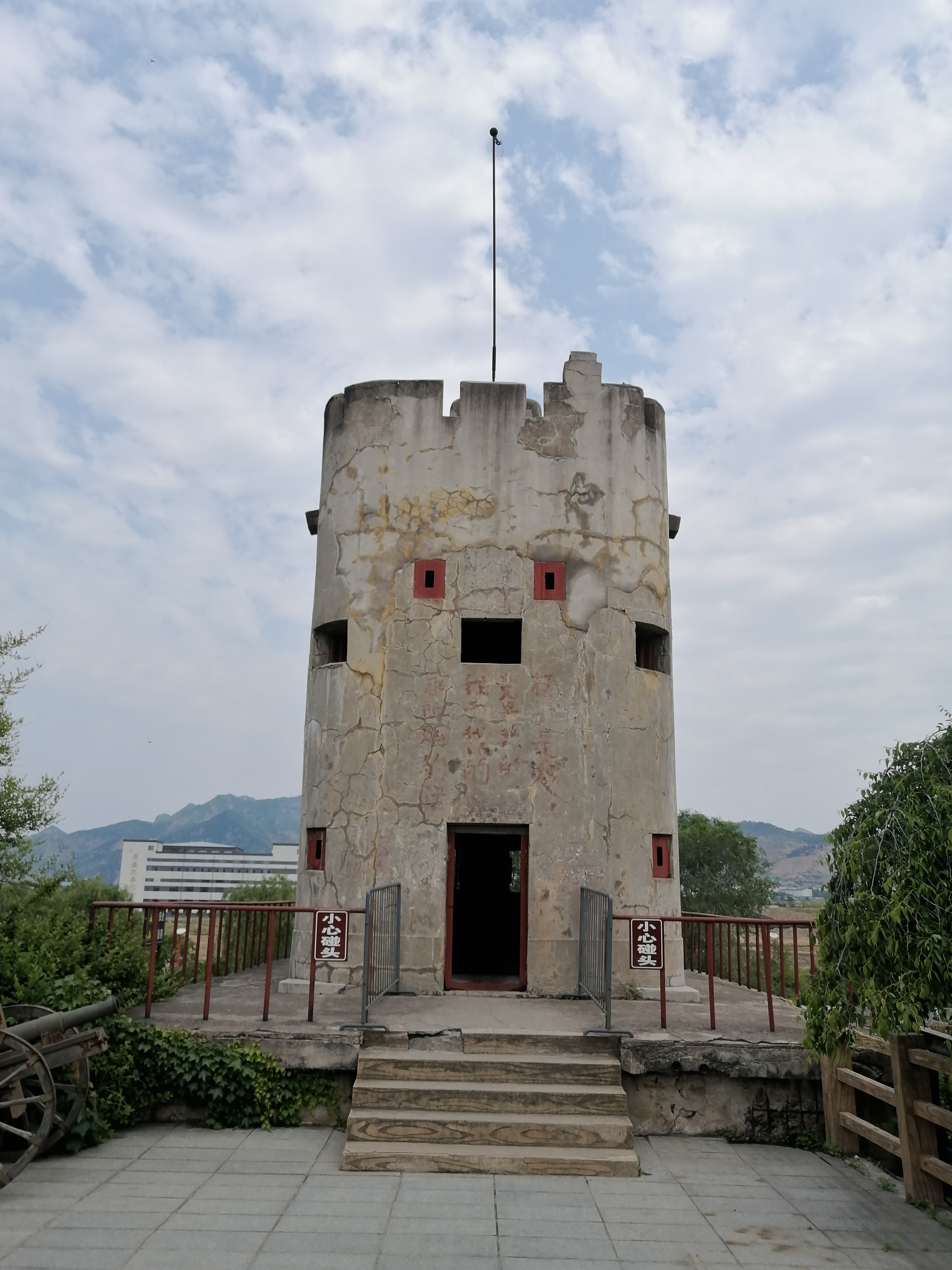
Xiajiefang Bridgehead used in the Korean War

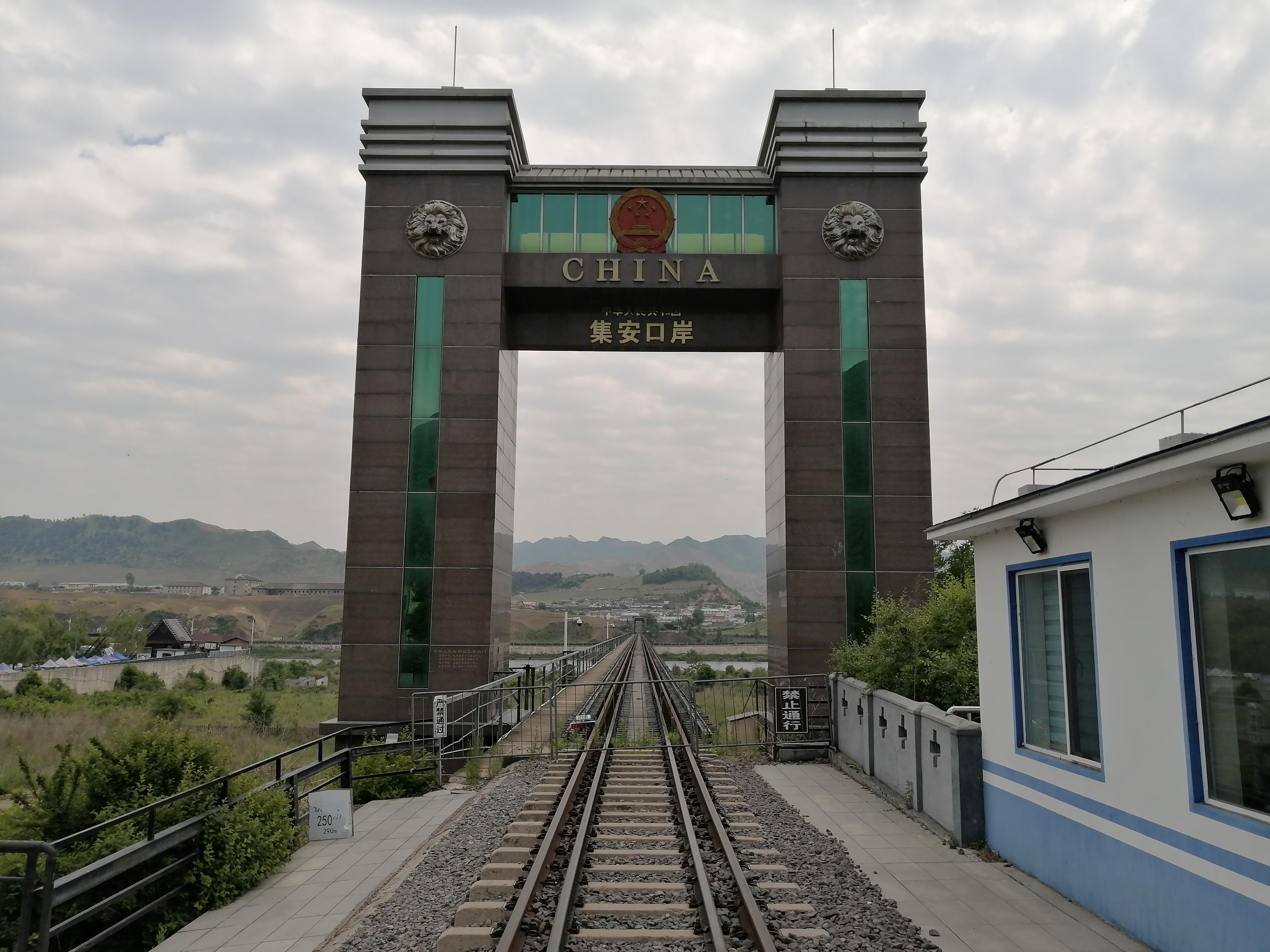
Ji'an Port

The Ji'an Yalu River Border Railway Bridge (Chinese: 集安鸭绿江国境铁路大桥; pinyin: Jí'ān Yālùjiāng Guójìng Tiělù Dàqiáo) is a single-track railway bridge that spans the Yalu River and connects the outskirts of the Chinese town of Ji'an in Jilin Province with the North Korean town of Manp'o in Chagang Province.

The bridge is 589.23 meters long and its height is 16 meters. It was constructed between 1937 and July 31, 1939 by Imperial Japan which during this time controlled both Korea and northeast China (through the puppet state of Manchukuo). A fortification near the Chinese end of the bridge dates from the same period. A square arch was added to the Chinese end of the bridge in 2004.

The bridge was used for shipping troops from China into Korea during the Korean War and was targeted by US aerial bombing; however, it was not destroyed.

From the Chinese side, the bridge is accessible for tourists who can walk up to a line close to the actual border.

A new border crossing was opened in April 2019.

== See also ==
- Sino–Korean Friendship Bridge and New Yalu River Bridge (Dandong City)
- Linjiang Yalu River Bridge
- Changbai-Hyesan International Bridge
- Tumen Border Bridge (Tumen City)
- Tumen River Bridge (Hunchun City)
