= Linjiang =

Linjiang 临江市
- County-level city
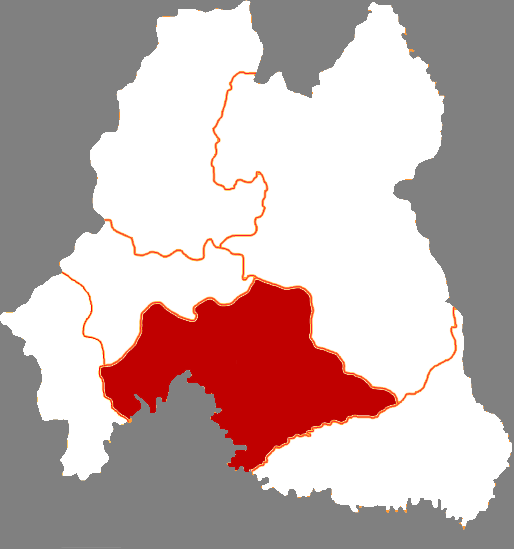
- Location in Baishan City

- Location of the city centre in Jilin
- Coordinates: 41°49′N 126°55′E
- Country: People's Republic of China
- Province: Jilin
- Prefecture-level city: Baishan
- Township-level divisions: 6 subdistricts 6 towns 1 township
- Municipal seat: Jianguo Subdistrict (建国街道)

Area
  - County-level city: 3,009 km^{2} (1,162 sq mi)
  - Urban: 170.84 km^{2} (65.96 sq mi)
- Elevation: 341 m (1,119 ft)

Population (2017)
  - County-level city: 162,000
  - Density: 53.8/km^{2} (139/sq mi)
  - Urban: 97,100
- Time zone: UTC+8 (China Standard)
- Postal code: 134600

Linjiang (simplified Chinese: 临江; traditional Chinese: 臨江; pinyin: Línjiāng; listed as Linkiang on old maps) is a county-level city in Baishan, Jilin, China. It is located to the east of Tonghua, and borders North Korea along the Yalu River.

== Culture ==
During 1953–76, there was a total of twenty-one Chinese films being shot on location in Linjiang, including Visitors on the Icy Mountain.

== Geography and climate ==
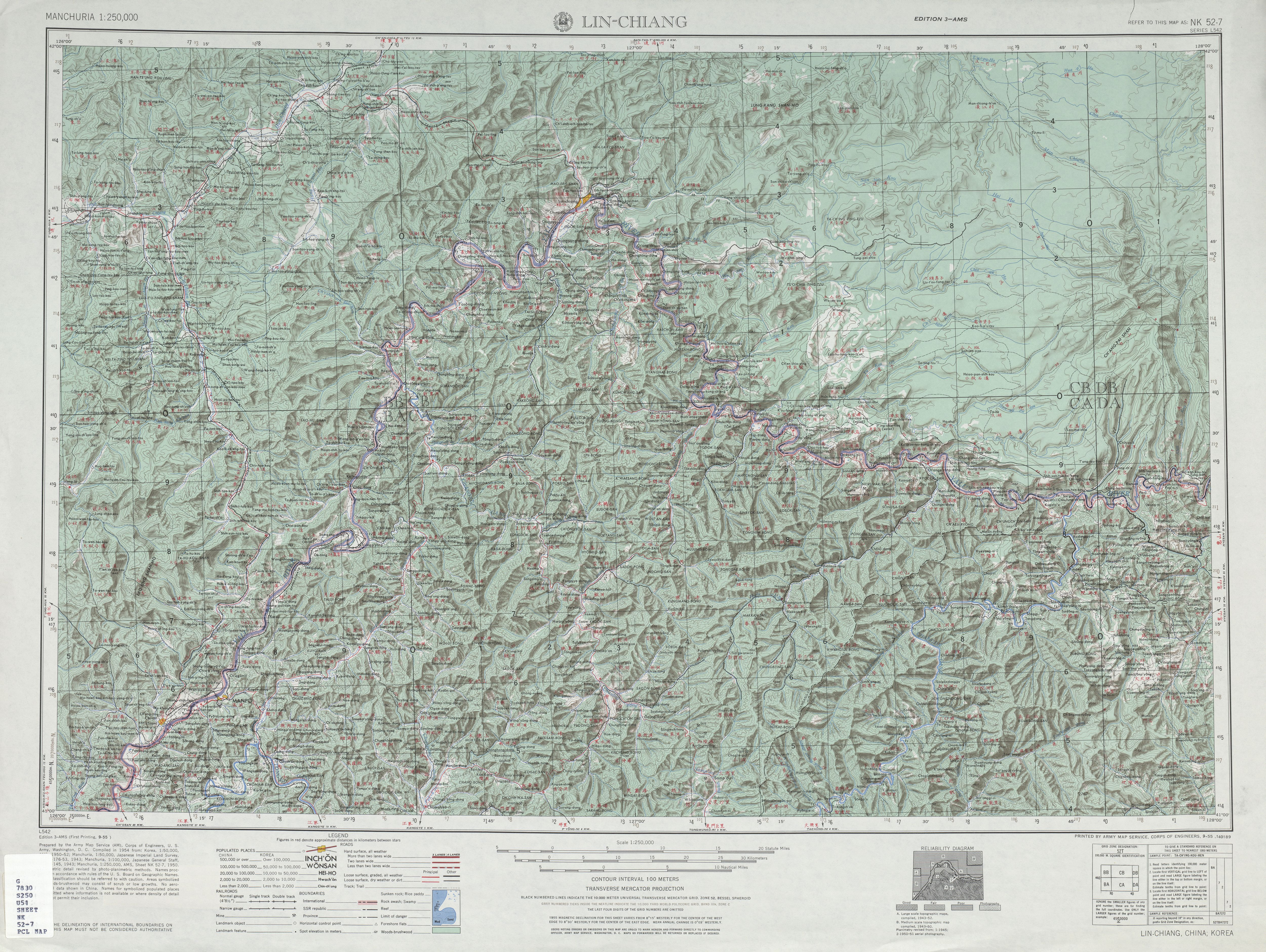
Linjiang (labelled as Lin-chiang 臨江) (1954)

Linjiang has a monsoon-influenced humid continental climate (Köppen Dwa), with long, very cold winters, and very warm, humid summers. Monthly average temperatures range from −15.3 °C (4.5 °F) in January to 22.3 °C (72.1 °F) in July, and the annual mean is 5.57 °C (42.0 °F). Though the annual total is generous, precipitation is quite low during the winter and rainfall is concentrated in the months of June through August. Sunshine is generous but falling far short of the central and western parts of Jilin; with monthly percent possible sunshine ranging from 42% in July to 60% in February, there are 2,232 hours of bright sunshine annually.

Climate data for Linjiang, elevation 380 m (1,250 ft), (1991–2020 normals, extremes 1951–present)
Month	Jan	Feb	Mar	Apr	May	Jun	Jul	Aug	Sep	Oct	Nov	Dec	Year
Record high °C (°F)	5.4 (41.7)	13.0 (55.4)	22.4 (72.3)	29.9 (85.8)	33.4 (92.1)	37.2 (99.0)	37.9 (100.2)	36.6 (97.9)	31.6 (88.9)	27.8 (82.0)	19.3 (66.7)	12.7 (54.9)	37.9 (100.2)
Mean daily maximum °C (°F)	−7.8 (18.0)	−1.9 (28.6)	5.8 (42.4)	15.3 (59.5)	22.1 (71.8)	26.1 (79.0)	28.6 (83.5)	27.6 (81.7)	22.6 (72.7)	15.0 (59.0)	3.6 (38.5)	−6.0 (21.2)	12.6 (54.7)
Daily mean °C (°F)	−14.8 (5.4)	−9.5 (14.9)	−1.0 (30.2)	7.8 (46.0)	14.4 (57.9)	19.2 (66.6)	22.6 (72.7)	21.5 (70.7)	15.0 (59.0)	7.1 (44.8)	−2.3 (27.9)	−12.0 (10.4)	5.7 (42.2)
Mean daily minimum °C (°F)	−20.3 (−4.5)	−15.7 (3.7)	−6.7 (19.9)	1.2 (34.2)	7.8 (46.0)	13.9 (57.0)	18.4 (65.1)	17.5 (63.5)	10.1 (50.2)	1.3 (34.3)	−6.9 (19.6)	−16.8 (1.8)	0.3 (32.6)
Record low °C (°F)	−35.1 (−31.2)	−33.5 (−28.3)	−28.3 (−18.9)	−16.4 (2.5)	−4.6 (23.7)	3.5 (38.3)	8.5 (47.3)	5.3 (41.5)	−2.3 (27.9)	−11.4 (11.5)	−27.0 (−16.6)	−34.6 (−30.3)	−35.1 (−31.2)
Average precipitation mm (inches)	10.0 (0.39)	14.3 (0.56)	23.7 (0.93)	39.3 (1.55)	84.3 (3.32)	111.1 (4.37)	196.2 (7.72)	161.5 (6.36)	67.0 (2.64)	43.1 (1.70)	37.4 (1.47)	18.0 (0.71)	805.9 (31.72)
Average precipitation days (≥ 0.1 mm)	7.3	7.2	8.6	10.2	13.8	15.0	16.3	14.9	9.6	9.7	10.2	9.4	132.2
Average snowy days	10.4	9.3	9.5	3.5	0	0	0	0	0	1.8	9.3	12.0	55.8
Average relative humidity (%)	69	64	59	56	63	73	79	81	78	68	71	72	69
Mean monthly sunshine hours	165.9	175.9	205.7	200.3	216.6	198.9	191.5	187.2	179.5	188.0	142.4	141.6	2,193.5
Percentage possible sunshine	56	58	55	50	48	44	42	44	48	55	49	50	50
Source: China Meteorological Administrationextremes

== Administrative divisions ==
There are six subdistricts, six towns and one townships under the city's administration:

Subdistricts

- Jianguo Subdistrict (建国街道), Xinshi Subdistrict (新市街道), Xinglong Subdistrict (兴隆街道), Dahu Subdistrict (大湖街道), Sengong Subdistrict (森工街道), Dalizi Subdistrict (大栗子街道)

Towns:

- Huashu (桦树镇), Liudaogou (六道沟镇), Weishahe (苇沙河镇), Huashan (花山镇), Naozhi (闹枝镇), Sidaogou (四道沟镇)

The only township is Mayihe Township (蚂蚁河乡)

== See also ==
- Linjiang Yalu River Bridge
