= Yalu River =

River on the border between China and North Korea

Yalu Amnok
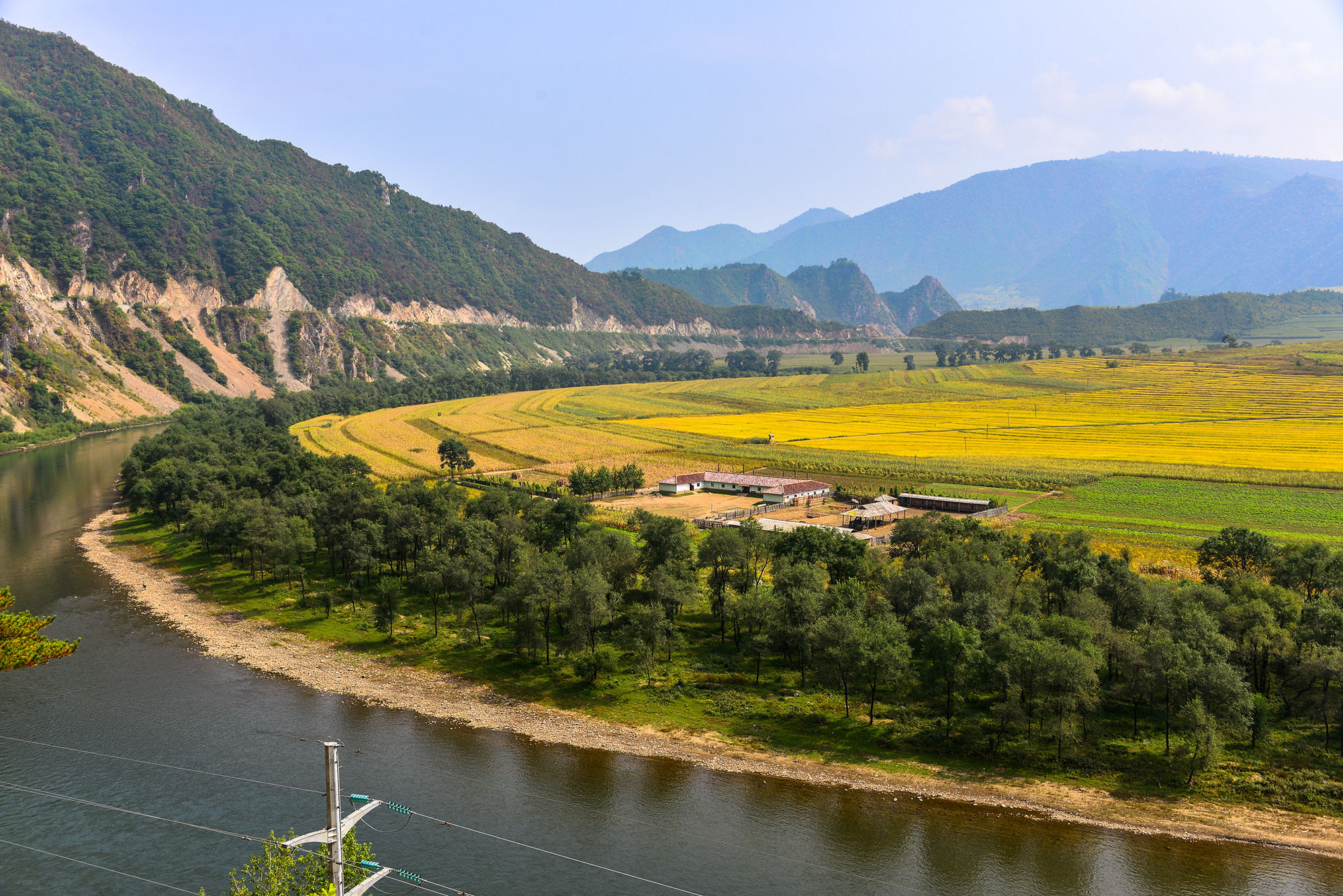
- Yalu River in Changbai, Jilin

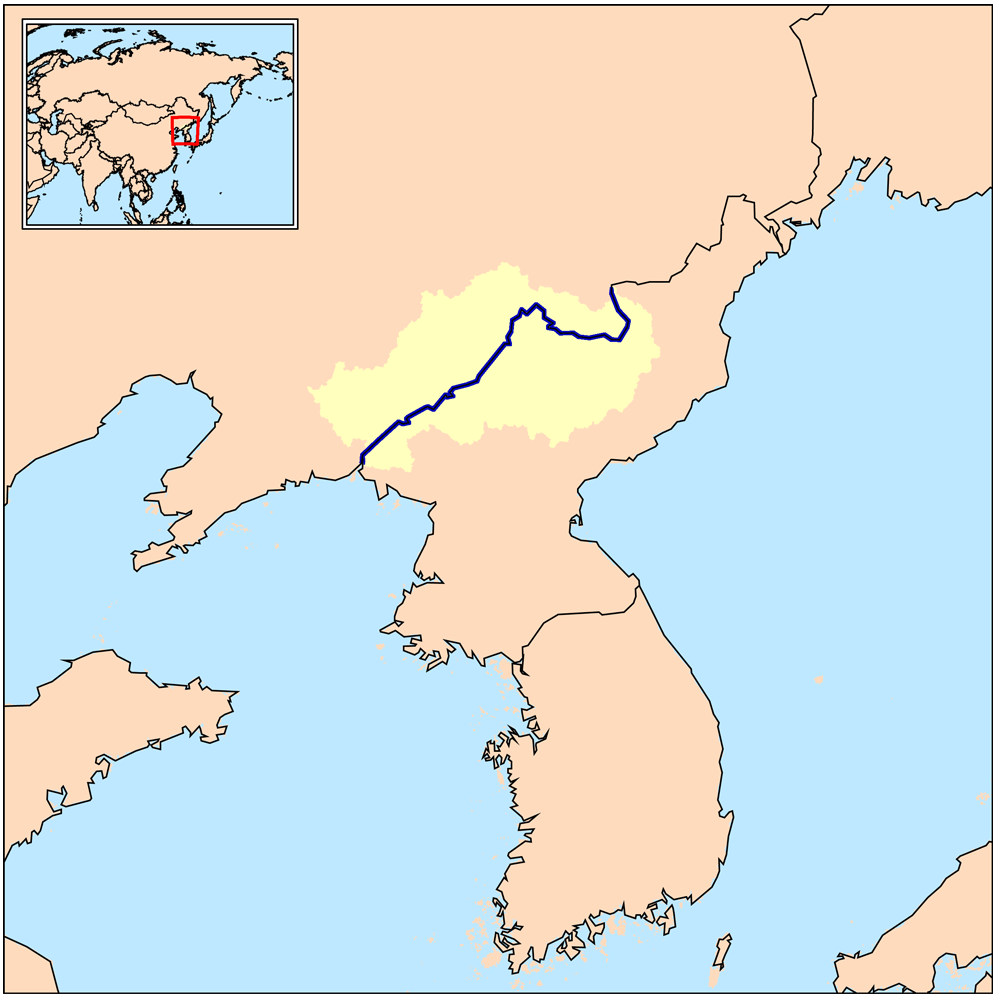
- Location of the Yalu River
- Etymology: See #Name
- Native name: 鸭绿江 (Chinese); 압록강 (Korean); ᠶᠠᠯᡠ ᡠᠯᠠ (Manchu)

Location
- Countries: China (PRC) and North Korea (DPRK)
- Provinces: Jilin (PRC), Liaoning (PRC), Ryanggang (DPRK), Chagang (DPRK), North Pyongan (DPRK), Sinuiju SAR (DPRK)

Physical characteristics
- Source: South of Heaven Lake, PRC-DPRK border, Paektu Mountain
  - coordinates: 41°58′8″N 128°4′24″E
- Mouth: Korea Bay
  - coordinates: 39°52′N 124°19′E
- Length: 790 km (490 mi)

Yalu River

Chinese name
- Traditional Chinese: 鴨綠江
- Simplified Chinese: 鸭绿江
Transcriptions
Standard Mandarin
- Hanyu Pinyin: Yālù Jiāng
- Wade–Giles: Ya^{1}-lu^{4} Chiang^{1}
- IPA: [jálû tɕjáŋ]
Wu
- Romanization: Ah^{平} loe^{去} kaon^{平}
Yue: Cantonese
- Jyutping: Aap^{3}luk^{6} Gong^{1}
- IPA: [ʔáːplʊ̀kkɔ́ːŋ]

Korean name
- Chosŏn'gŭl: 압록강
- Hancha: 鴨綠江
Transcriptions
- Revised Romanization: Amnokgang
- McCune–Reischauer: Amnokkang

Manchu name
- Manchu script: ᠶᠠᠯᡠ ᡠᠯᠠ
- Romanization: Yalu ula

The Yalu River (Chinese: 鸭绿江; pinyin: Yālù Jiāng) or Amnok River (Korean: 압록강; MR: Amnokkang) is a river on the border between China and North Korea. Together with the Tumen River to its east, and a small portion of Paektu Mountain, the Yalu forms the border between China and North Korea. Its valley has been the scene of several military conflicts in the past centuries. It borders North Korea to the south and China to the north.

== Name ==
The Chinese name Yalu ("duck-green") was first attested during the Tang dynasty. According to the Tongdian (8th century), the river was named after its color, which resembled that of a mallard's head. The Korean name "Amnok" follows the Sino-Korean reading of the same name. In ancient times, the river was known as Peishui (Paesu, 浿水) or Mazishui (Majasu, 馬訾水).

Historically, it was also known by the Korean name of Arinarye (아리나례강, 阿利那禮江). Ari, a word from Old Korean used to refer to the 'spirituality (신령성; 神靈性) of the sun'. The second component might be related to the Old Korean word for 'river, stream', nari (나리, 川理).

Two other theories exist for the name Yalu: one theory is that the name derived from Yalu ula (ᠶᠠᠯᡠ
ᡠᠯᠠ) in the Manchu language. The Manchu word yalu (ᠶᠠᠯᡠ) means "the boundary between two countries". In Mandarin Chinese, yālù phonetically approximates the original Manchu word, but literally means "duck green", which was said to have been once the color of the river. The other theory is that the river was named after the combination of its two upper branches, which were called "鴨" (Yā or Ap) and "綠" (Lù or "Rok"/"Nok"), respectively.

Revised Romanization of Korean spelled it Amnokgang (Korean pronunciation: [amnok.k͈aŋ]; "Amnok River") and Revised Romanization of Hangeul spelled it Aprokgang (Korean pronunciation: [amnok.k͈aŋ]; "Aprok River").

== Geography ==
From 2,500 metres (8,200 feet) above sea level on Paektu Mountain on the China–North Korea border, the river flows south to Hyesan before sweeping 130 km (81 mi) north-west to Linjiang and then returning to a more southerly route for a further 300 km (190 mi) to empty into Korea Bay between Dandong (China) and Sinuiju (North Korea). The bordering Chinese provinces are Jilin and Liaoning, while the bordering North Korean provinces are North Pyongan, Chagang and Ryanggang.

The river is 795 kilometers (494 mi) long and receives water from over 30,000 km^{2} (12,000 sq mi) of land. The Yalu's most significant tributaries are the Changjin (장진강; 長津江), the Hochon (허천강; 虛川江), the Togro (독로강; 禿魯江) rivers from Korea and the Ai (or Aihe) (璦河) and the Hun (浑江) from China. The river is not easily navigable for most of its length. Most of the river freezes during winter and can be crossed on foot.

The depth of the Yalu River varies from some of the more shallow parts on the eastern side in Hyesan (1 meter (3 ft 3 in)) to the deeper parts of the river near the Yellow Sea (2.5 meters (8 ft 2 in)). The estuary is the site of the Amrok River estuary Important Bird Area, identified as such by BirdLife International.

About 205 islands are on the Yalu. A 1962 border treaty between North Korea and China split the islands according to which ethnic group was living on each island. North Korea possesses 127 and China 78. Due to the division criteria, some islands such as Hwanggumpyong Island belong to North Korea, but abut the Chinese side of the river.

== History ==
=== Imperial era ===
The river basin is the site where the ancient Korean kingdom of Goguryeo rose to power. Many former fortresses are located along the river and the former capital of that kingdom was situated at what is now the medium-sized city of Ji'an along the Yalu, a site rich in Goguryeo-era relics. Wihwa Island on the river is historically famous as the place where, in 1388, General Yi Songgye (later Taejo of Joseon) decided to turn back his army southward to Kaesong in the first of a series of revolts that eventually led to the establishment of the Joseon dynasty.

According to one scholar, the Korean-Chinese border along the Yalu River is the longest unchanged international border in history, lasting for at least 1,000 years.

The river has been the site of several battles because of its strategic location between Korea and China, including:

- Battle of the Yalu River (1894) – First Sino-Japanese War
- Battle of Yalu River (1904) – Russo-Japanese War
- Battle near to the Yalu River (1950) – Korean War

The southern side of the river was heavily industrialized during the period of Japanese rule (1910–1945), and by 1945 almost 20% of Japan's total industrial output originated in Korea.

Evolution of Korean territories

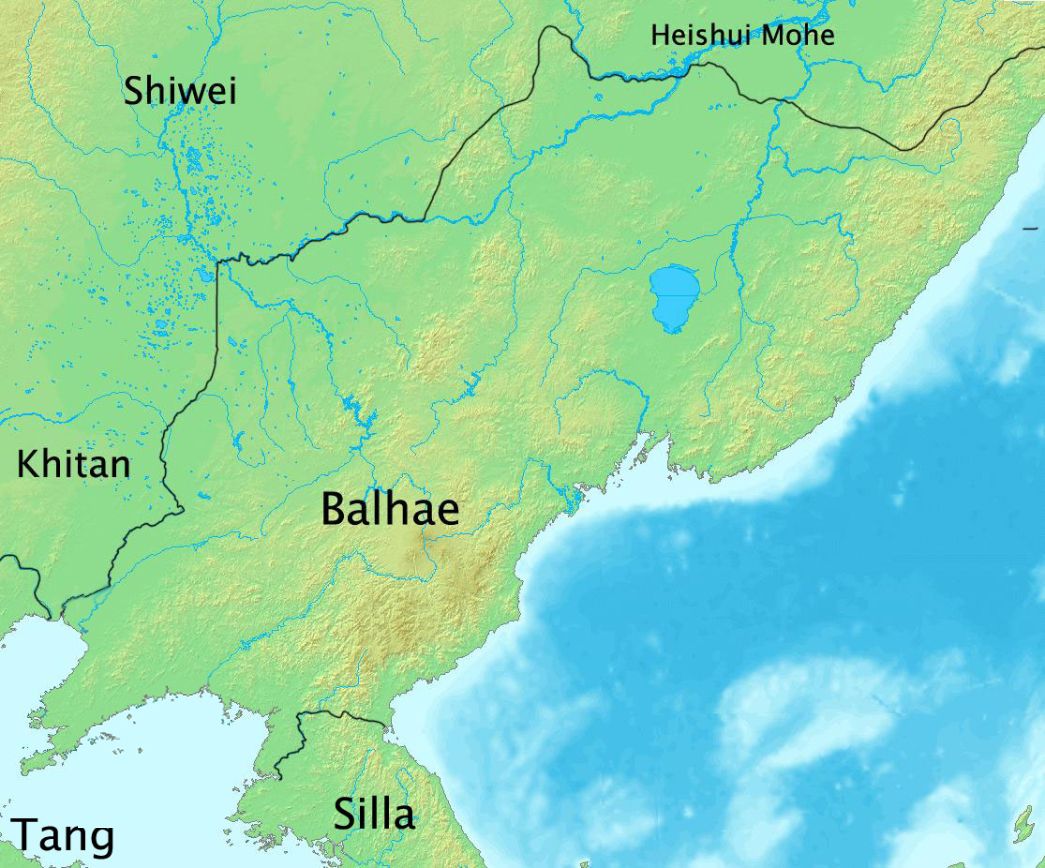
Balhae or Bohai (698–926)

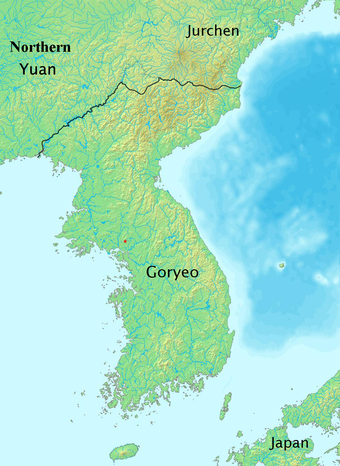
Goryeo (918–1392)

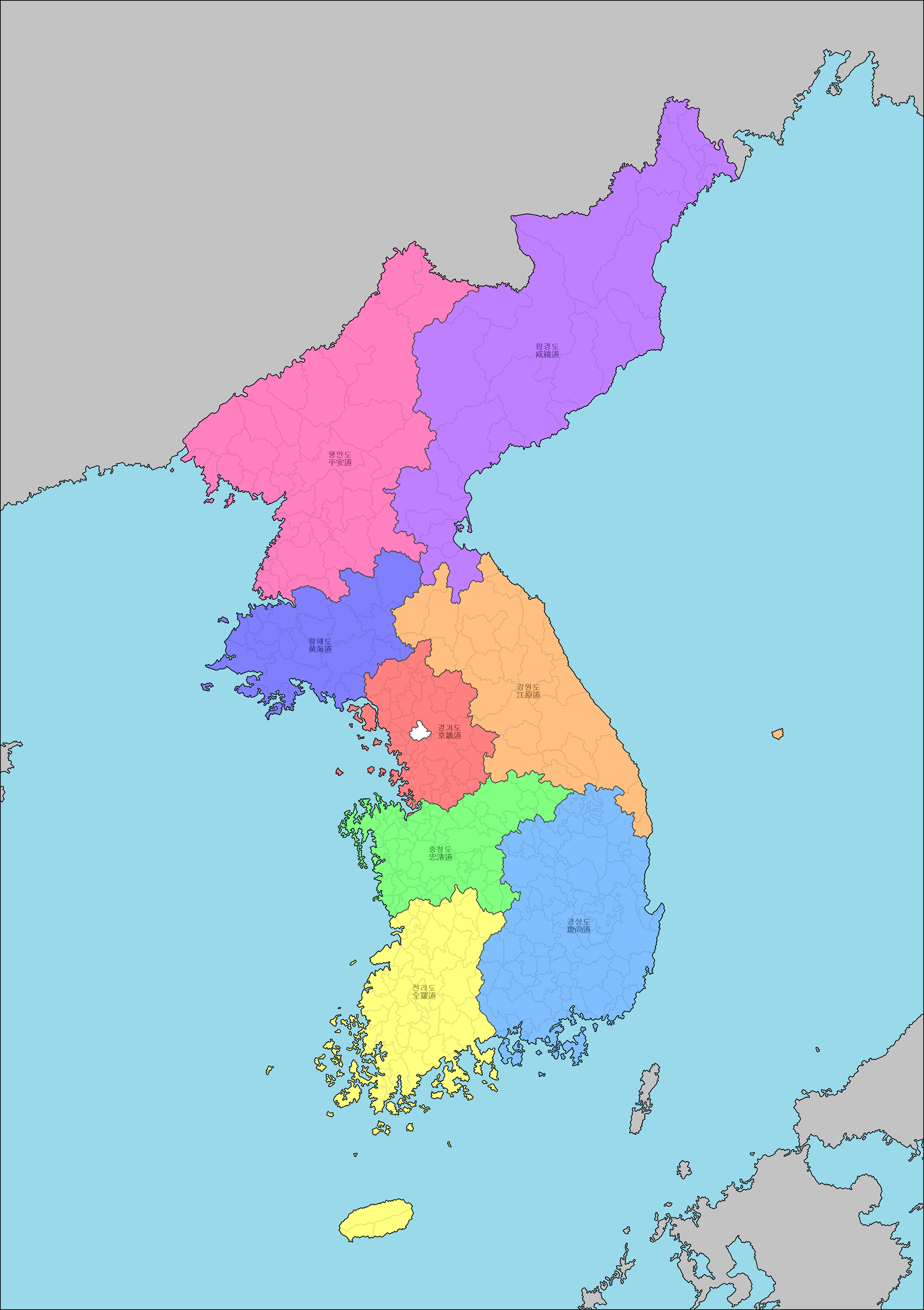
Joseon (1392–1897)

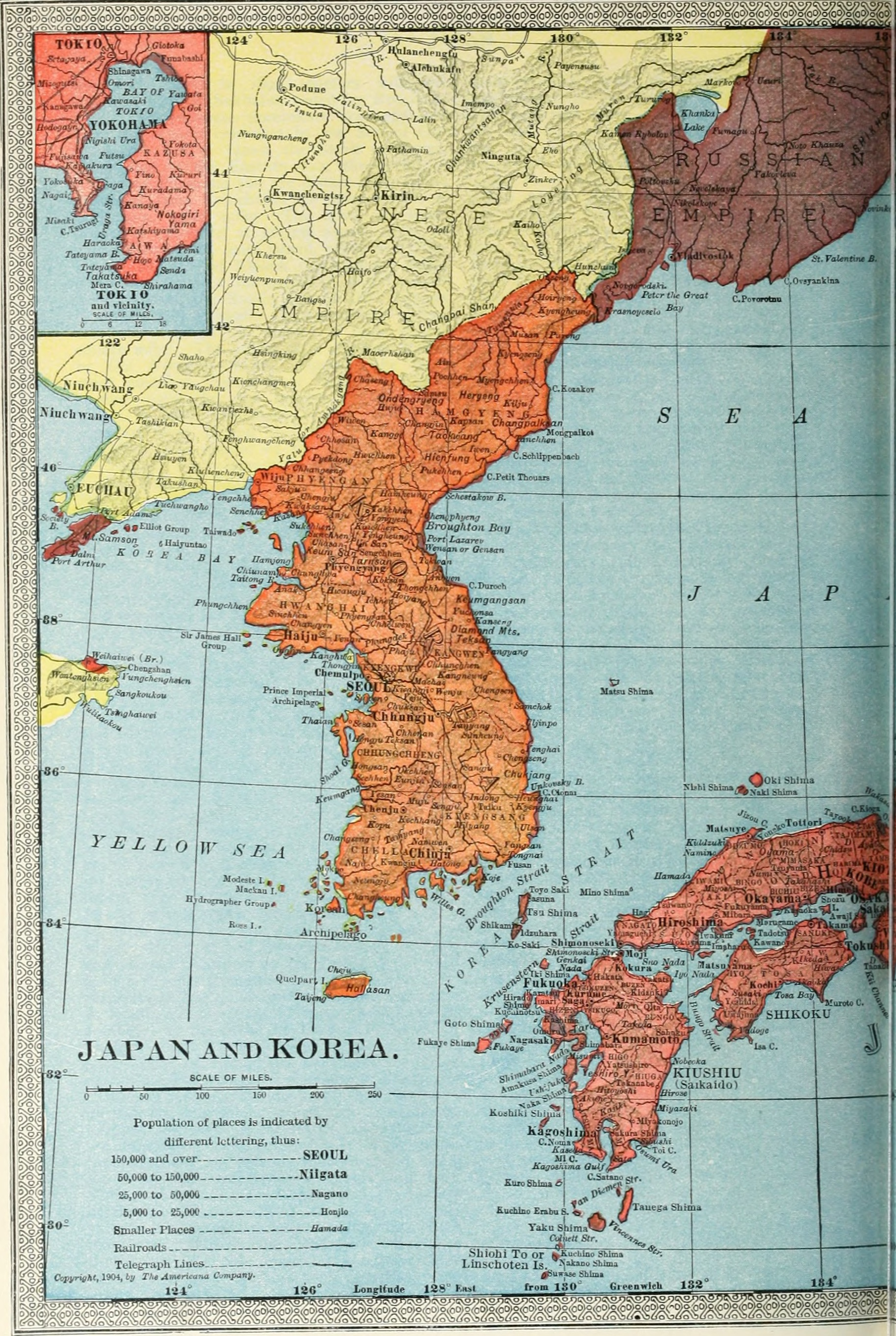
Chōsen (1910–1945)

=== Korean War ===
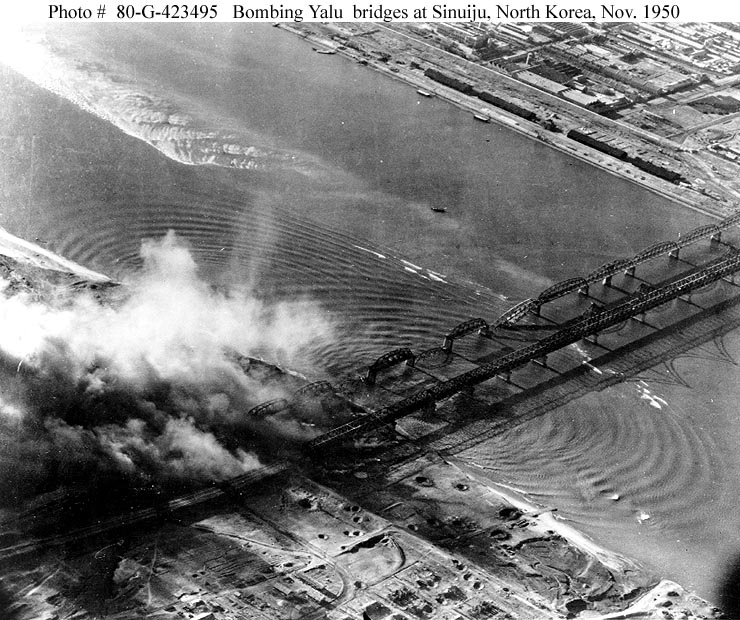
Bombing of Yalu River Bridges in 1950

During the Korean War, the movement of United Nations troops approaching the river, despite repeated warnings by China not to, precipitated massive Chinese intervention from around Dandong. In the course of the conflict every bridge across the river except one was destroyed. The one remaining bridge was the Sino-Korean Friendship Bridge connecting Sinuiju, North Korea to Dandong, China. During the war the valley surrounding the western end of the river also became the focal point of a series of dogfights for air supremacy over North Korea, earning the nickname "MiG Alley" in reference to the MiG-15 fighters flown by the combined North Korean, Chinese, and Soviet forces. As UN forces during the Korean War advanced toward the Yalu, China under Chairman Mao Zedong entered the war on the side of North Korea under Kim Il-sung.

To promote the morale, in 1950 Ma Fuyao (麻扶摇) and Zheng Lücheng (郑律成) composed the Chinese military anthem The Chinese People's Volunteers Army Song (中国人民志愿军战歌), which mentioned the Yalu River, and later the song became one of the most popular and representative musical expressions of the Chinese intervention in Korea. It sings:

雄赳赳, 气昂昂, 跨过鸭绿江.

保和平, 卫祖国, 就是保家乡.

Marching bold with heads held high, we crossed the Yalu wide.

To guard the peace and homeland dear is home we must defend with pride.

=== After the war ===
The river has frequently been crossed by North Koreans fleeing to China since the early 1990s, although the Tumen River remains the most-used way for such refugees.

== Economy ==
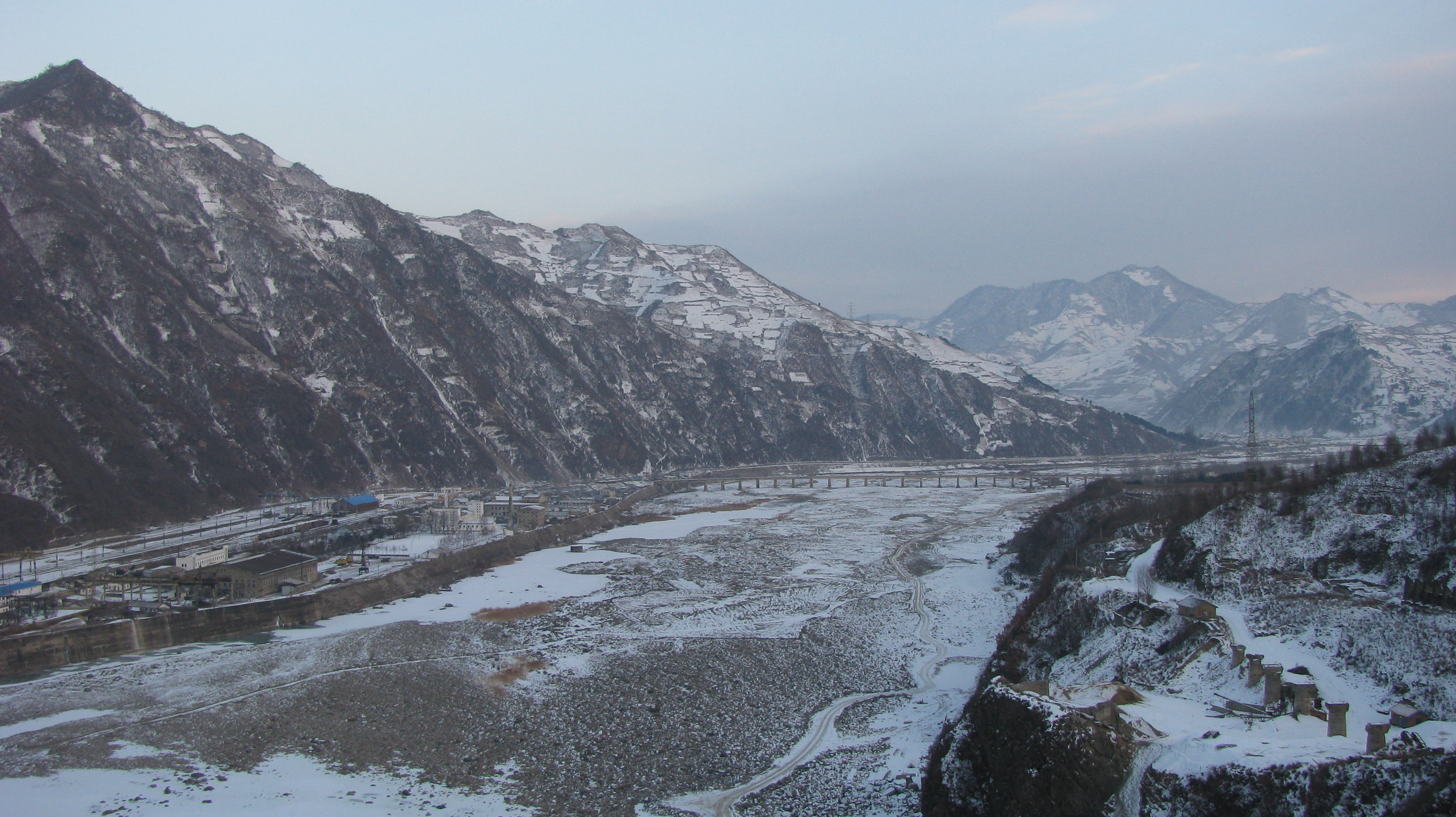
The Yalu near the Unbong Dam

The river is important for hydroelectric power, and one of the largest hydroelectric dams in Asia is in Sup'ung Dam, 106 metres (348 feet) high and over 850 metres (2,790 feet) long, located upstream from Sinuiju, North Korea. The dam has created an artificial lake over a portion of the river, called Supung Lake. In addition, the river is used for transportation, particularly of lumber from its forested banks. The river provides fish for the local population. Downstream of Sup'ung is the Taipingwan Dam. Upstream of Sup'ung is the Unbong Dam. Both dams produce hydroelectric power, as well.

In the river delta upstream from Dandong and adjacent to Hushan are several North Korean villages. Economic conditions in these villages have been described as poor, without access to electricity.

== Crossings ==
- Ji'an Yalu River Border Railway Bridge, Ji'an China – Manp'o, North Korea
- New Yalu River Bridge, under construction between Dandong, China and Sinŭiju, North Korea
- Sino-Korean Friendship Bridge, Dandong, China – Sinŭiju, North Korea

== Gallery ==
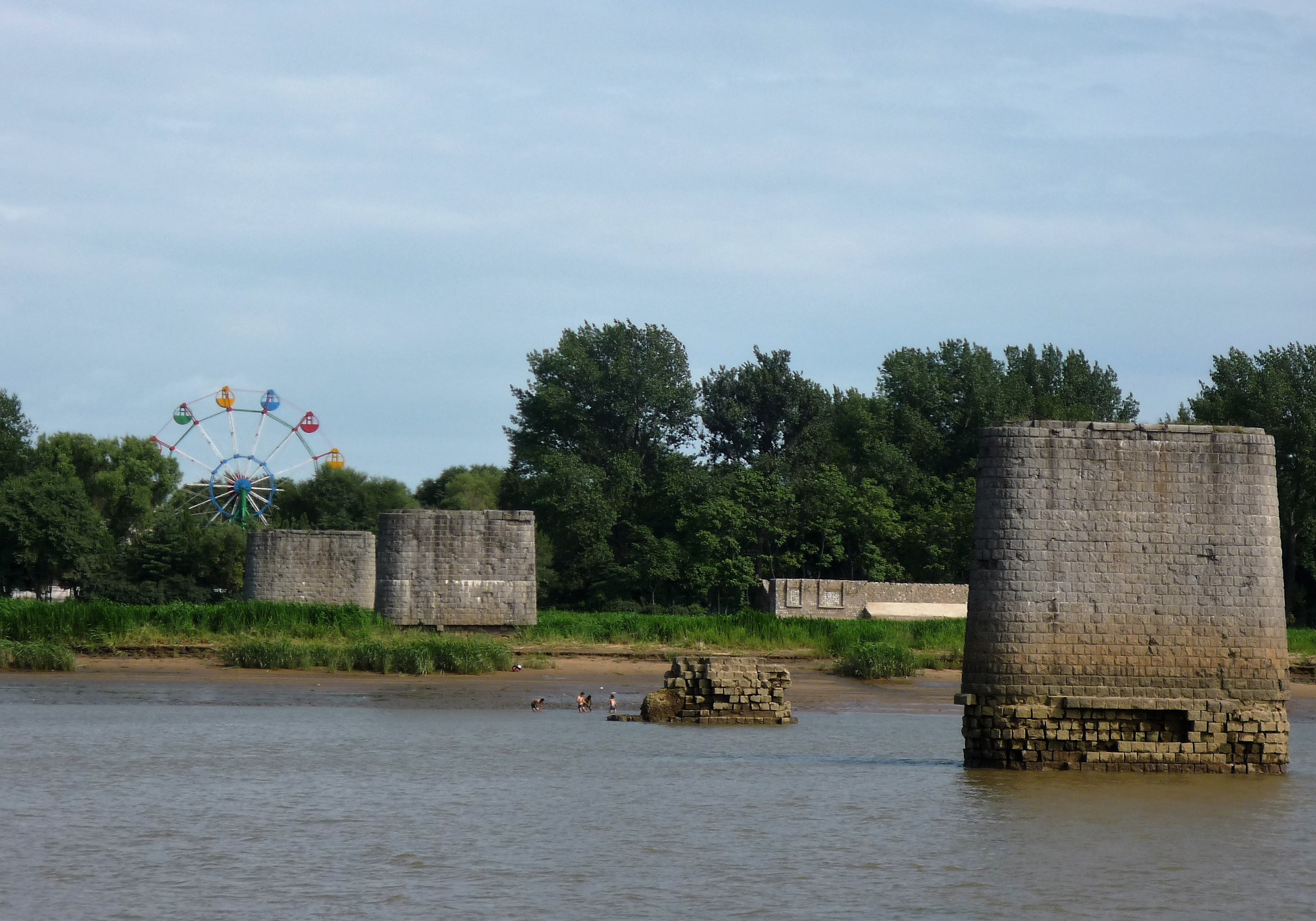
The pillar stubs of the Yalu River Broken Bridge between Dandong and Sinuiju, which was established in 1911 and destroyed during the Korean War (direction of photo looking south into North Korea).

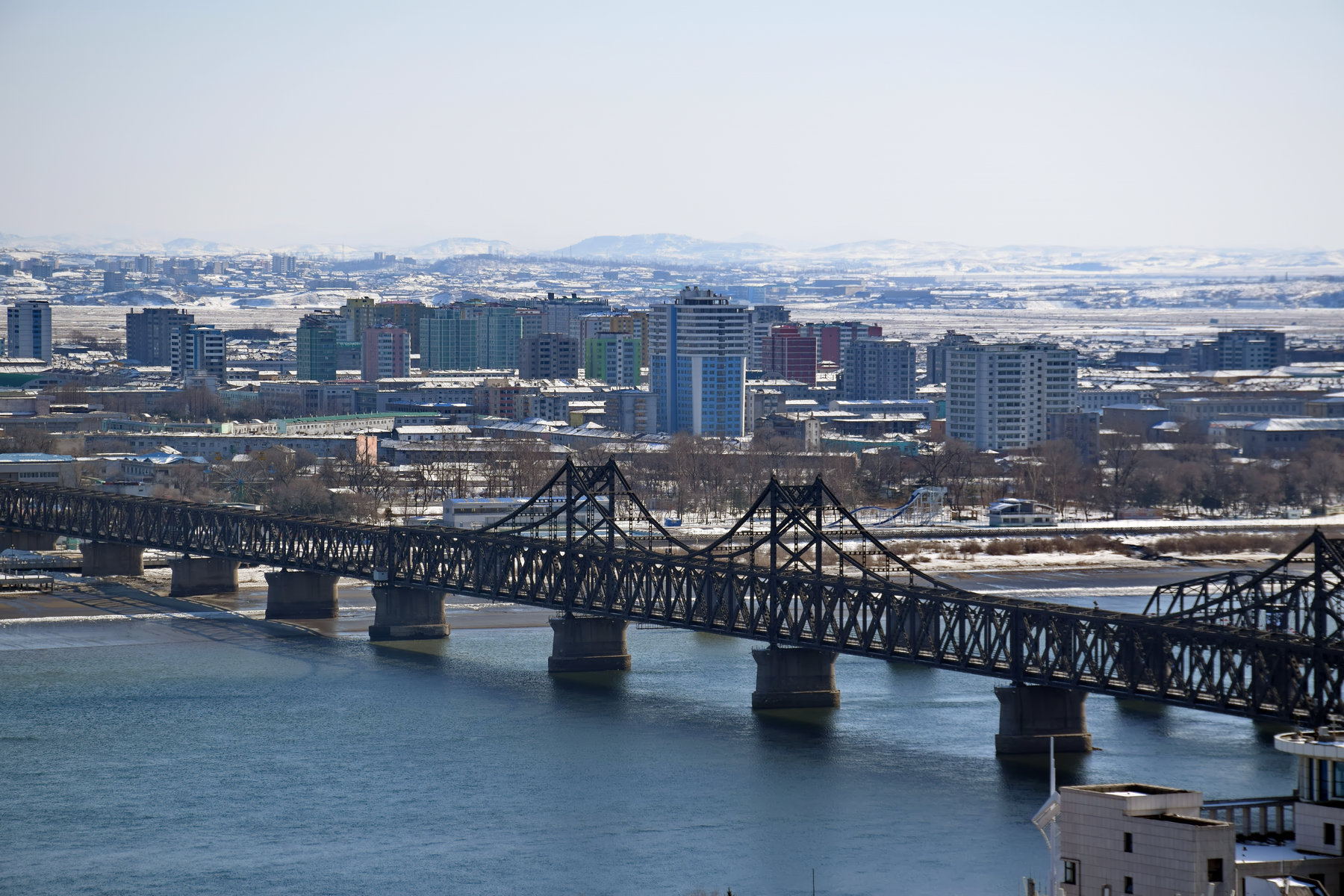
The Sino–Korean Friendship Bridge across the Yalu (Amnokgang) linking Sinuiju and Dandong; the bridge which opened to traffic in 1943 and also fell to destruction by US aerial attacks during the war but was successfully repaired after 1953.

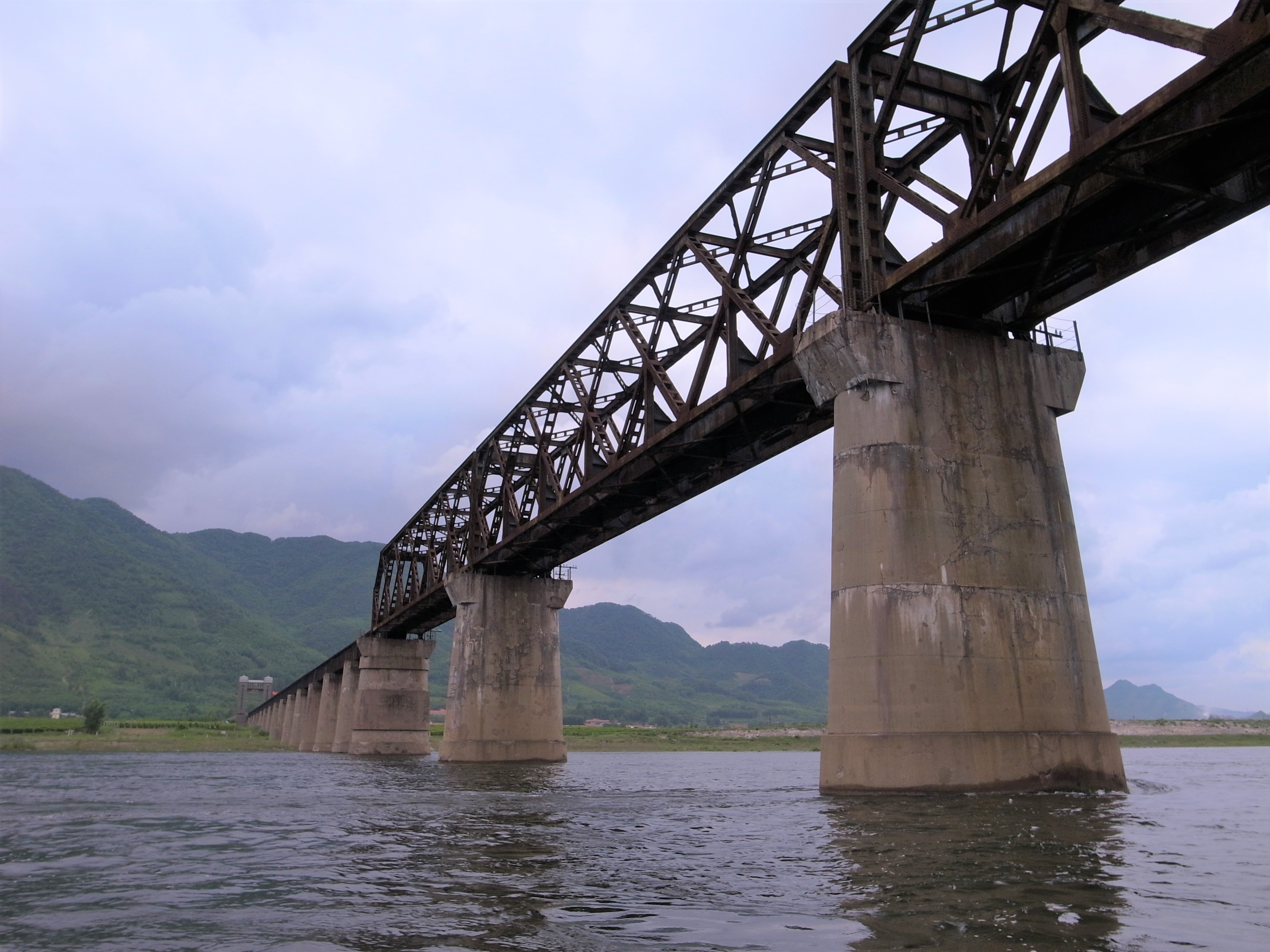
The bridge on Yalu from Ji'an to Manpo

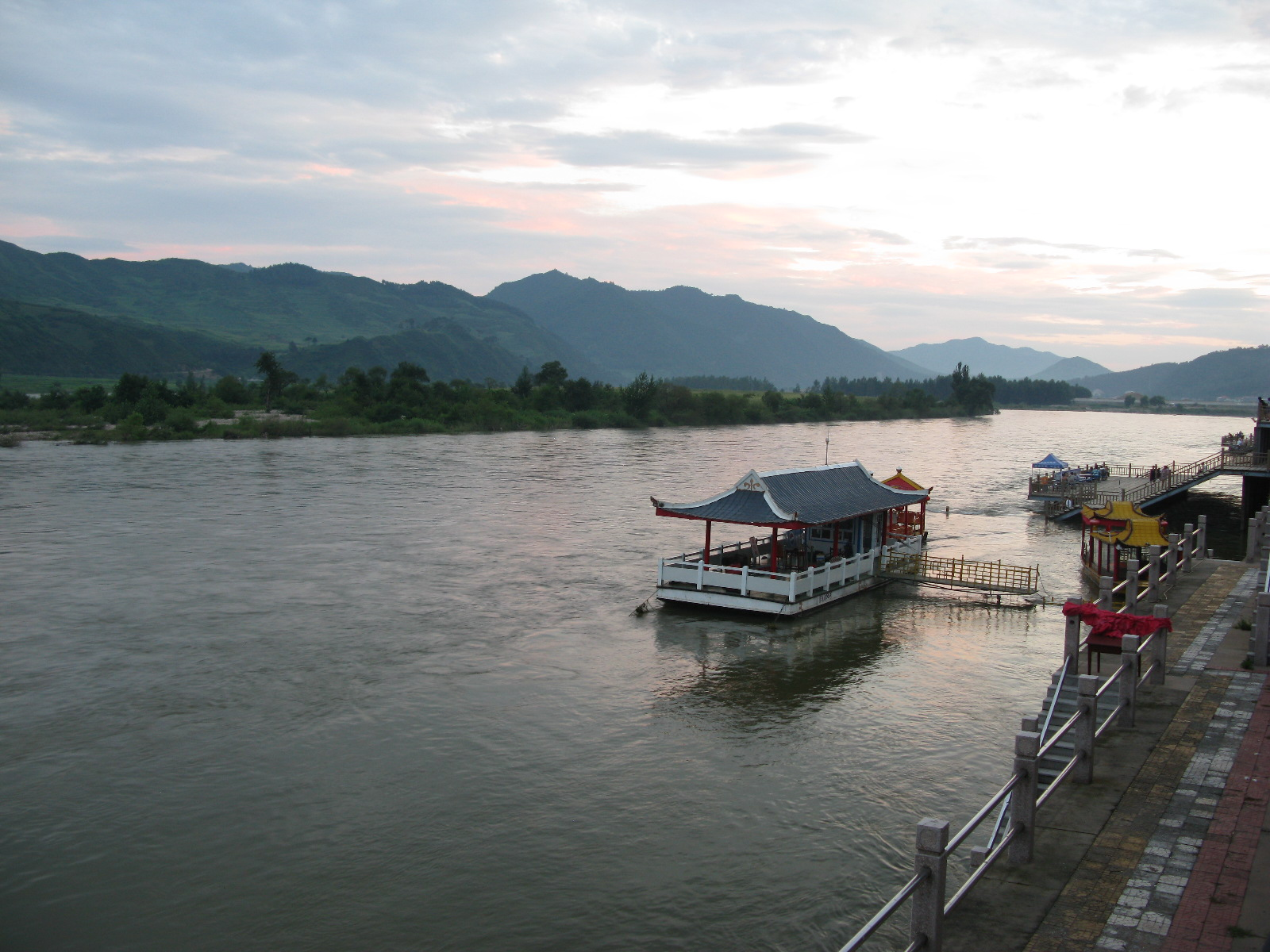
The Yalu River at Ji'an, Jilin

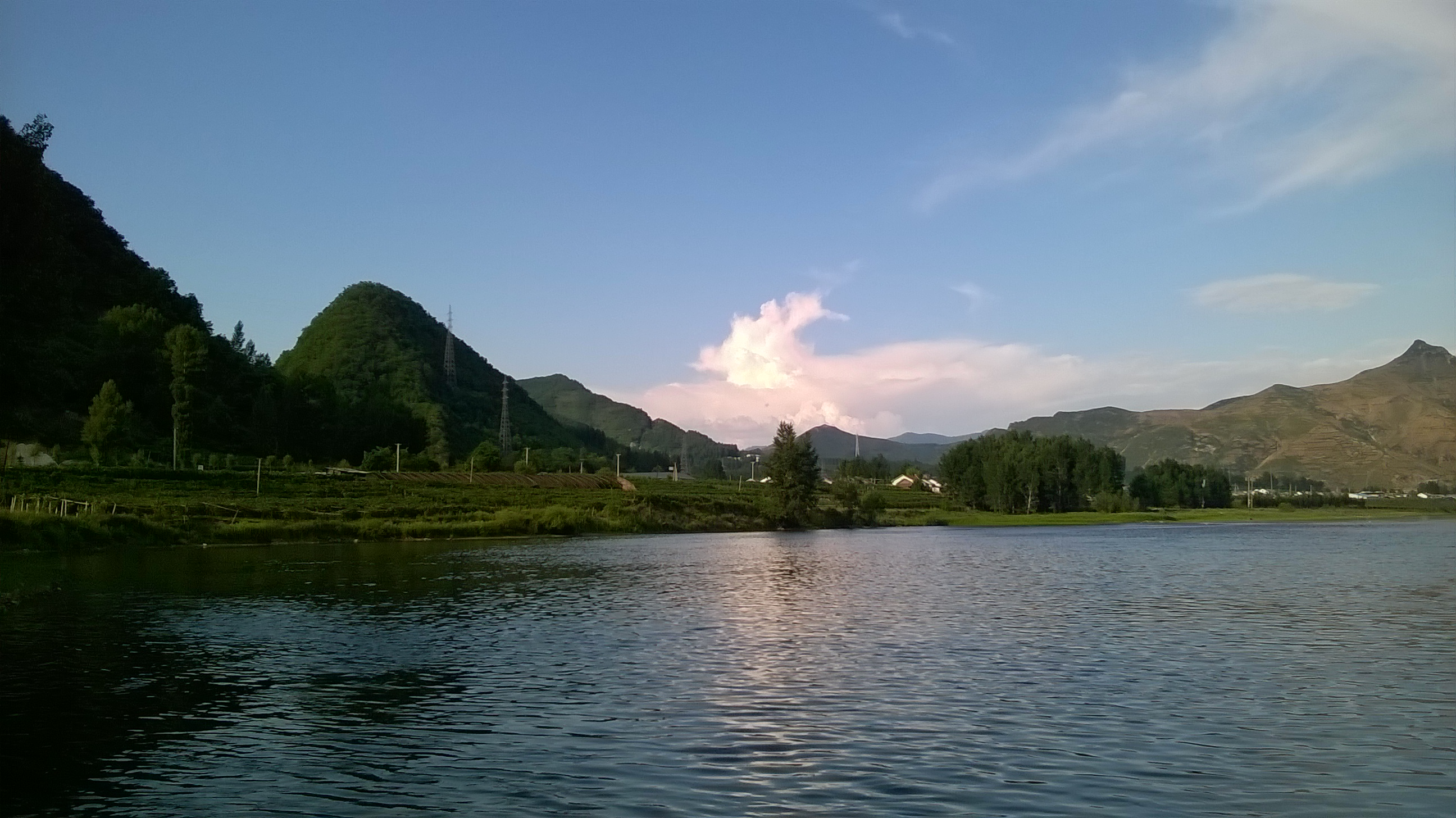
The right side with lush forest is Ji'an, China, and on the left is Manpo, North Korea, which can be identified by bare hills, as forests were all chopped for firewoods

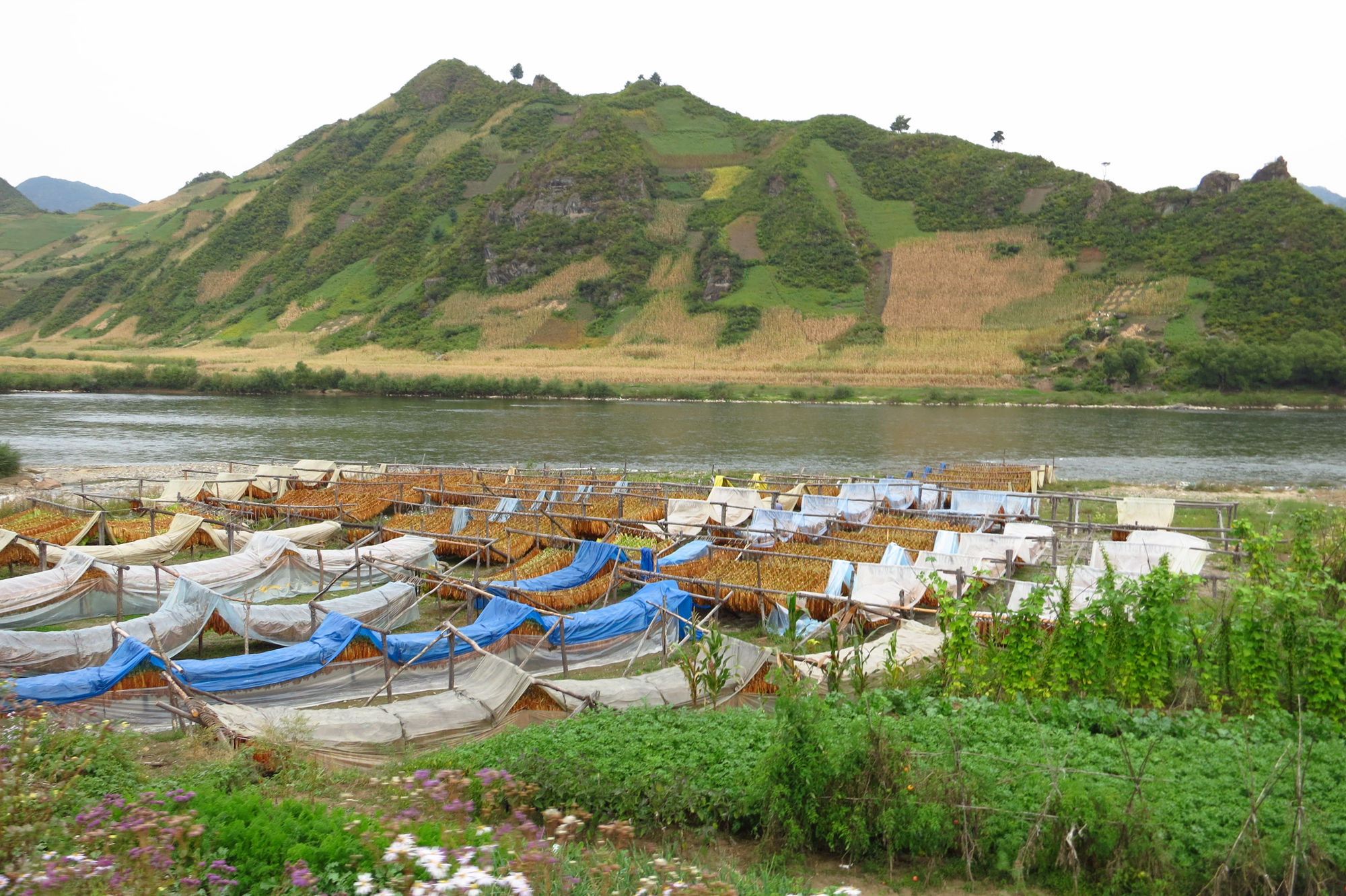
Near Linjiang, Jilin

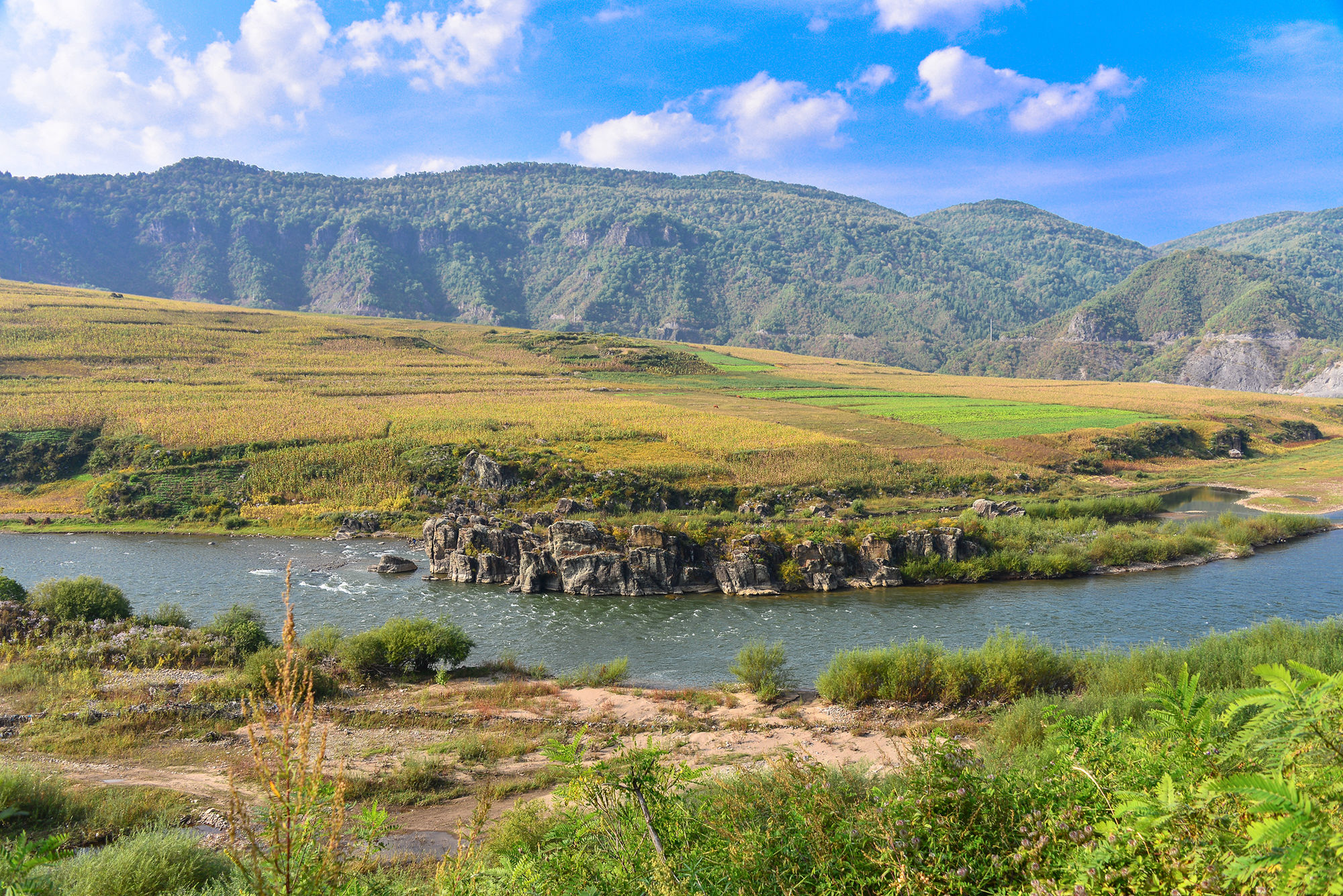
Near Changbai, Jilin

== See also ==
- Sino-Korean Friendship Bridge
- China–North Korea relations
- Geography of China
- Geography of North Korea
- Tumen River
- Wusuli River
