= Changbai Korean Autonomous County =

Changbai County 长白县 · 장백현
- Autonomous county
- Changbai Korean Autonomous County 长白朝鲜族自治县 · 장백조선족자치현
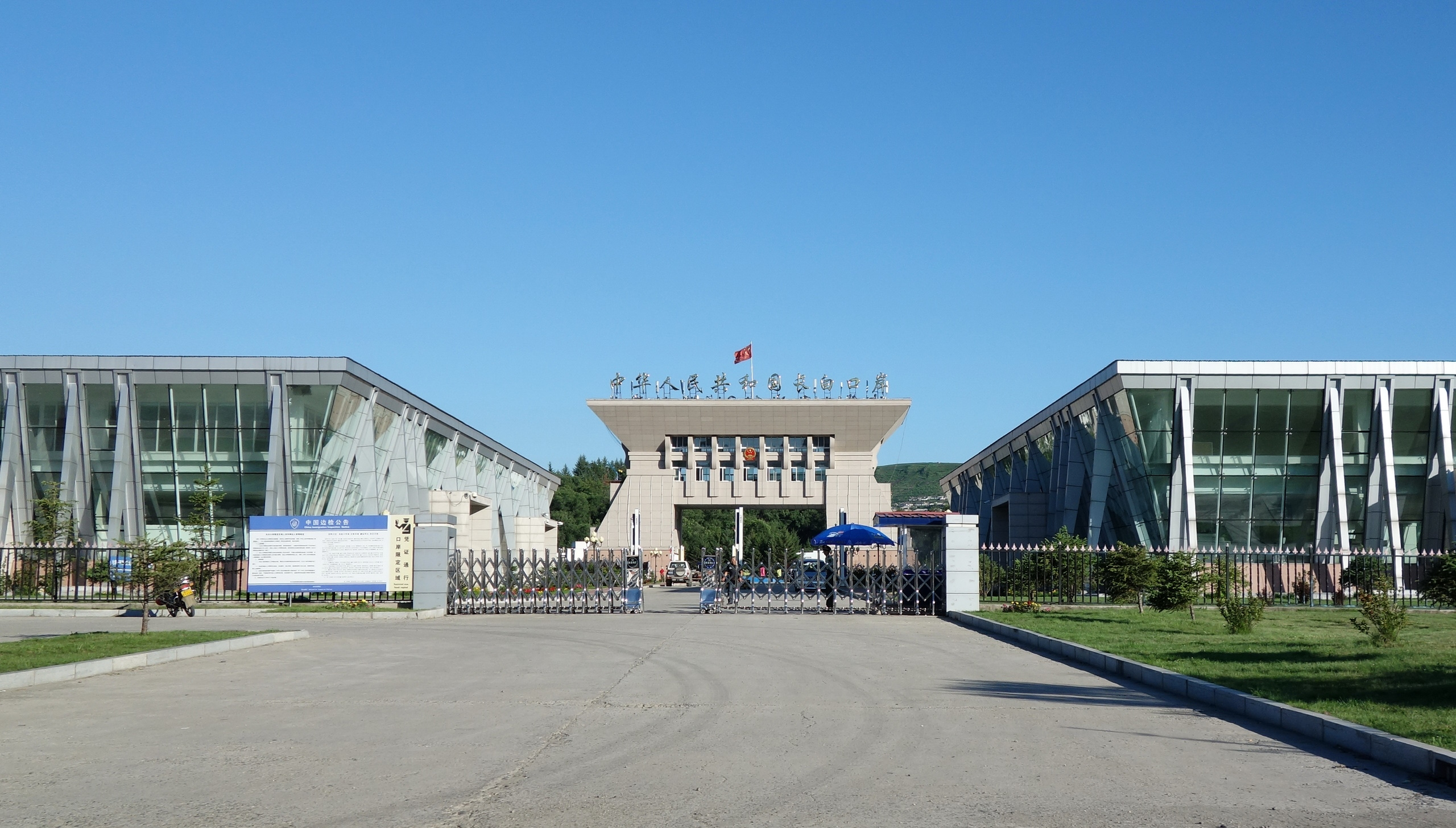
- China–North Korea border crossing in Changbai

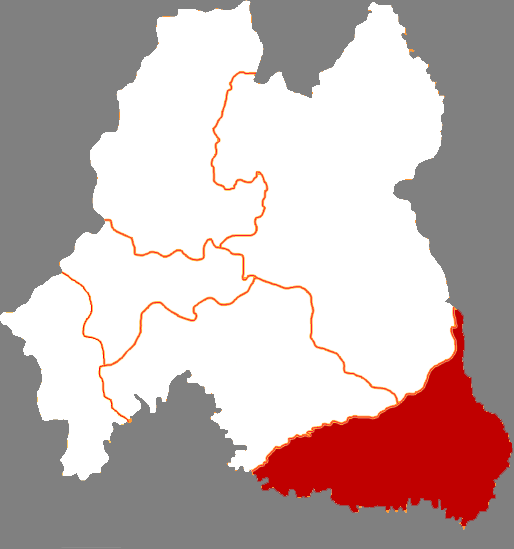
- Location within Baishan City

- Location of the seat in Jilin
- Coordinates: 41°25′N 128°12′E
- Country: China
- Province: Jilin
- Prefecture-level city: Baishan
- County seat: Changbai

Area
  - Total: 2,497.6 km^{2} (964.3 sq mi)
- Elevation: 730 m (2,400 ft)

Population (2020 census)
  - Total: 58,266
  - Density: 23.329/km^{2} (60.421/sq mi)
- Time zone: UTC+8 (China Standard)
- Postal code: 134400
- Website: www.changbai.gov.cn

Changbai Korean Autonomous County
- Simplified Chinese: 长白朝鲜族自治县
- Traditional Chinese: 長白朝鮮族自治縣
- Hanyu Pinyin: Chángbái Cháoxiǎnzú Zìzhìxiàn
Transcriptions
Standard Mandarin
- Hanyu Pinyin: Chángbái Cháoxiǎnzú Zìzhìxiàn
- Bopomofo: ㄔㄤˊ ㄅㄞˊ ㄔㄠˊ ㄒㄧㄢˇ ㄗㄨˊ ㄗˋ ㄓˋ ㄒㄧㄢˋ
- Gwoyeu Romatzyh: Charngbair Chaursheantzwu Tzyhjyhshiann
- Wade–Giles: Chʻang^{2}-pai^{2} Chʻao^{2}-hsien^{3}-tsu^{2} Tzŭ^{4}-chih^{4}-hsien^{4}
- Yale Romanization: Chángbái Cháusyǎndzú Dz̀jr̀syàn
- IPA: [ʈʂʰǎŋ.pǎɪ ʈʂʰǎʊ.ɕjɛ̀n.tsǔ tsɹ̩̂.ʈʂɻ̩̂.ɕjɛ̂n]
Yue: Cantonese
- Jyutping: Coeng^{4}baak^{6} Ciu^{4}sin^{1}zuk^{6} Zi^{6}zi^{6}jyun^{2}

Chinese Korean name
- Chosŏn'gŭl: 장백조선족자치현
- Hancha: 長白朝鮮族自治縣
Transcriptions
- Revised Romanization: Jangbaek Joseonjok Jachihyeon
- McCune–Reischauer: Changbaek Chosŏnjok Chach'ihyŏn

South Korean name
- Hangul: 창바이 조선족 자치현
- Hanja: 창바이朝鮮族自治縣
Transcriptions
- Revised Romanization: Changbai Joseonjok Jachihyeon
- McCune–Reischauer: Ch'angbai Chosŏnjok Chach'ihyŏn

Changbai Korean Autonomous County, (Note: Chinese: 长白朝鲜族自治县; pinyin: Chángbái Cháoxiǎnzú Zìzhìxiàn; Korean: 장백조선족자치현; RR: Jangbaek Joseonjok Jachihyeon; MR: Changbaek Chosŏnjok Chach'ihyŏn) or simply Changbai County, (Note: Chinese: 长白县; pinyin: Chángbái xiàn; Korean: 장백현; RR: Jangbaek hyeon; MR: Changbaek hyŏn) is a county in southern Jilin province, China, facing Hyesan, North Korea.

== Geography ==
It is under the administration of the city of Baishan, 160 kilometres (99 mi) to the west-northwest, and has an area of 2,497.6 km^{2} (964.3 sq mi). The county has a total population of 85,000 people, 14,000 of which are ethnic Koreans (16.9% of the county's population).

Changbai is one of only two Korean autonomous areas of China, the other being Yanbian Korean Autonomous Prefecture.

== Administrative divisions ==
There are seven towns and one township.

| Name | Simplified Chinese | Hanyu Pinyin | Korean | McCune–Reischauer | Administrative division code |
|---|---|---|---|---|---|
Towns
| Changbai Town | 长白镇 | Chángbái zhèn | 장백진 | changbaek chin | 220623100 |
| Badaogou Town | 八道沟镇 | Bādàogōu zhèn | 팔도구진 | p'altoku chin | 220623101 |
| Shisidaogou Town | 十四道沟镇 | Shísìdàogōu zhèn | 십사도구진 | sipsatoku chin | 220623102 |
| Malugou Town | 马鹿沟镇 | Mǎlùgōu zhèn | 마록구진 | marokku chin | 220623103 |
| Baoquanshan Town | 宝泉山镇 | Bǎoquánshān zhèn | 보천산진 | poch'ŏnsan chin | 220623104 |
| Xinfangzi Town | 新房子镇 | Xīnfángzi zhèn | 신방자진 | sinpangcha chin | 220623105 |
| Shi'erdaogou Town | 十二道沟镇 | Shí'èrdàogōu zhèn | 십이도구진 | sipitoku chin | 220623106 |
Township
| Jinhua Township | 金华乡 | Jīnhuá xiāng | 금화향 | kŭmhwa hyang | 220623200 |

== Climate ==
Climate data for Changbai, elevation 775 m (2,543 ft), (1991–2020 normals, extremes 1956–present)
| Month | Jan | Feb | Mar | Apr | May | Jun | Jul | Aug | Sep | Oct | Nov | Dec | Year |
|---|---|---|---|---|---|---|---|---|---|---|---|---|---|
| Record high °C (°F) | 3.7 (38.7) | 10.9 (51.6) | 20.6 (69.1) | 29.0 (84.2) | 33.2 (91.8) | 33.6 (92.5) | 36.0 (96.8) | 36.4 (97.5) | 29.7 (85.5) | 28.0 (82.4) | 20.0 (68.0) | 6.5 (43.7) | 36.4 (97.5) |
| Mean daily maximum °C (°F) | −9.2 (15.4) | −4.0 (24.8) | 3.7 (38.7) | 13.0 (55.4) | 20.5 (68.9) | 24.4 (75.9) | 26.9 (80.4) | 26.1 (79.0) | 21.2 (70.2) | 13.5 (56.3) | 2.2 (36.0) | −7.7 (18.1) | 10.9 (51.6) |
| Daily mean °C (°F) | −16.8 (1.8) | −12.1 (10.2) | −3.6 (25.5) | 5.2 (41.4) | 12.3 (54.1) | 16.8 (62.2) | 20.2 (68.4) | 19.4 (66.9) | 13.0 (55.4) | 5.2 (41.4) | −4.6 (23.7) | −14.6 (5.7) | 3.4 (38.1) |
| Mean daily minimum °C (°F) | −22.9 (−9.2) | −19.1 (−2.4) | −10.1 (13.8) | −1.6 (29.1) | 5.0 (41.0) | 10.5 (50.9) | 15.2 (59.4) | 14.5 (58.1) | 6.9 (44.4) | −1.3 (29.7) | −10.0 (14.0) | −20.1 (−4.2) | −2.7 (27.1) |
| Record low °C (°F) | −36.4 (−33.5) | −33.1 (−27.6) | −28.7 (−19.7) | −15.9 (3.4) | −5.5 (22.1) | −1.3 (29.7) | 6.1 (43.0) | 0.4 (32.7) | −5.9 (21.4) | −16.3 (2.7) | −27.9 (−18.2) | −35.7 (−32.3) | −36.4 (−33.5) |
| Average precipitation mm (inches) | 7.1 (0.28) | 13.1 (0.52) | 16.8 (0.66) | 33.3 (1.31) | 66.9 (2.63) | 90.6 (3.57) | 147.4 (5.80) | 122.7 (4.83) | 58.1 (2.29) | 29.7 (1.17) | 24.8 (0.98) | 11.9 (0.47) | 622.4 (24.51) |
| Average precipitation days (≥ 0.1 mm) | 7.8 | 7.4 | 9.7 | 10.8 | 15.0 | 16.2 | 17.5 | 15.9 | 8.7 | 8.4 | 10.2 | 9.3 | 136.9 |
| Average snowy days | 10.8 | 10.0 | 11.6 | 6.8 | 0.5 | 0 | 0 | 0 | 0 | 2.5 | 10.5 | 12.8 | 65.5 |
| Average relative humidity (%) | 66 | 62 | 58 | 56 | 60 | 70 | 77 | 78 | 74 | 63 | 68 | 69 | 67 |
| Mean monthly sunshine hours | 194.9 | 196.1 | 225.6 | 219.9 | 232.5 | 214.8 | 203.3 | 203.5 | 212.9 | 213.1 | 169.0 | 170.1 | 2,455.7 |
| Percentage possible sunshine | 66 | 65 | 61 | 55 | 52 | 47 | 45 | 48 | 58 | 63 | 58 | 60 | 57 |
Source: China Meteorological Administration

== See also ==
- Changbai–Hyesan International Bridge
- Yanbian Korean Autonomous Prefecture
- Koreans in China
