= New Yalu River Bridge =

Bridge between North Korea and China

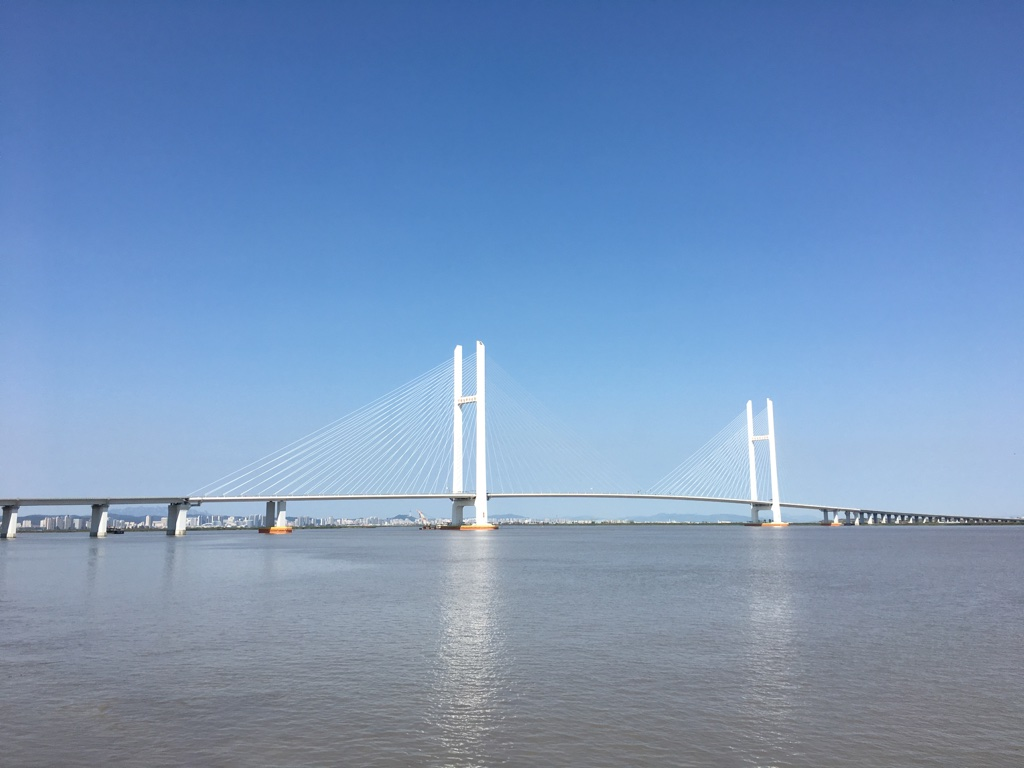
- New Yalu River Bridge in September 2016
- Coordinates: 40°02′08″N 124°22′10″E
- Carries: AH1 Asian Highway 1
- Crosses: Yalu River, China–North Korea border
- Locale: Dandong, Liaoning, China; Sinŭiju, North P'yŏngyan, North Korea
- Official name: Korea-China Amnok River Bridge 中朝鸭绿江大桥 (Chinese) 조중압록강다리 (Korean)
- Other name(s): New Yalu River Bridge 新鸭绿江大桥 (Chinese) 신압록강다리 (Korean)

Characteristics
- Design: Cable-stayed bridge
- Material: Steel, concrete
- Total length: 3 km (1.9 mi)
- Height: 194.6 m (638.5 ft)
- Longest span: 636 m (2,086.6 ft)
- No. of lanes: 4

History
- Construction start: October 2011
- Construction end: October 2014
- Opened: 15 October 2026

Location
- Interactive map of New Yalu River Bridge

The New Yalu River Bridge (Chinese: 新鸭绿江大桥; Korean: 신압록강다리), officially the Korea-China Amnok River Bridge (中朝鸭绿江大桥; 조중압록강다리), is a road bridge across the Yalu River between Dandong, Liaoning Province, China, and Sinuiju, North Korea. The cable-stayed bridge, which is 3 kilometers (1.9 mi) long including the supporting roads, is intended to replace the Sino-Korean Friendship Bridge. Construction began in October 2011 and was mostly complete and connected with Xingdan Road by October 2014, but the project was stalled between 2014 and 2019, with work unfinished on the North Korean side. By 2021, construction on the North Korean side had been mostly completed, and the bridge opened in October 2026.

== Construction history ==
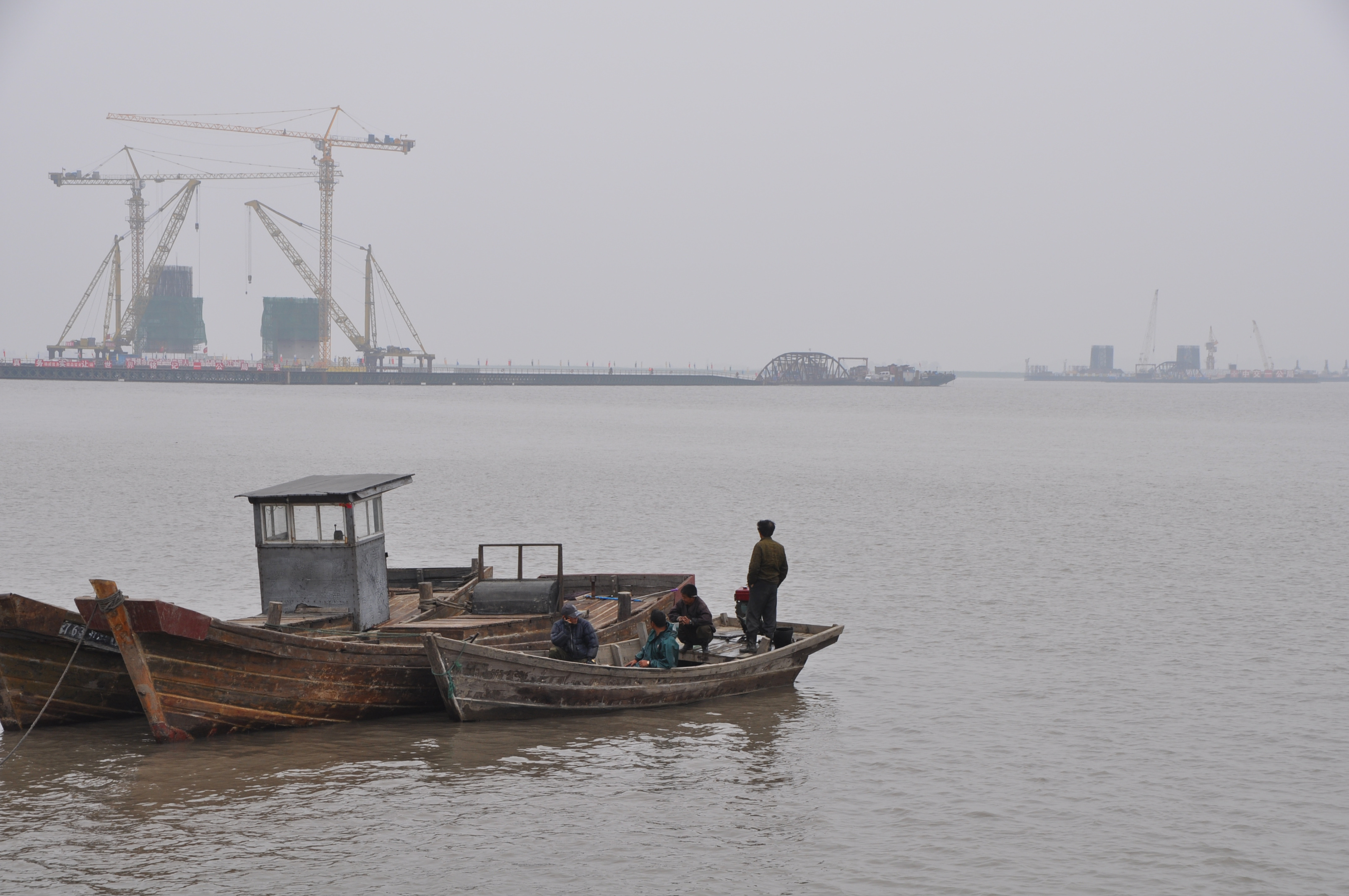
The New Yalu River Bridge under construction. The Chinese side on the left and the North Korean side on the far right, in early June 2012.

The New Yalu River Bridge was built to replace the Sino-Korean Friendship Bridge, one of two other bridges in the area, and to improve travel and trade between the two countries. The Sino-Korean Friendship Bridge, which opened in 1943, is only wide enough for a single rail track and a single reversible lane. It also cannot carry trucks over 20 tonnes.

North Korea approved plans to build the New Yalu River Bridge when Wen Jiabao, then the Premier of China, visited the country in 2010. The bridge would be part of a development project including free trade zones on North Korean islands in the Yalu river.

Construction of the New Yalu River Bridge began in 2011, reportedly cost China US$350 million to complete, and has multiple lanes to carry traffic in both directions.

Originally planned to open in 2014, the bridge had its opening postponed indefinitely due to delays on the North Korean side, where the bridge ended in a field outside of Sinuiju. In October 2017, Yonhap reported that North Korea had demanded that "Beijing to cover more of the costs of building the border bridge".

In June 2019, Chinese Communist Party general secretary Xi Jinping pledged to pay for roads and customs posts on the North Korean side of the bridge, according to unnamed sources.

In late September, the construction for road links and customs posts on the North Korean side of the bridge began. By April 2020 the project was reportedly near completion. According to sources cited by South Korean newspaper Dong-a Ilbo, the works, planned to be completed during the first half of 2020, were delayed due to the COVID-19 pandemic. The project was paused from mid-August to October.

In October 2021, Yonhap reported that the bridge ramps on the North Korean side had since been completed, and that the bridge would be opened soon, as North Korea would restart border trade.

In February 2025, the works on the customs and immigration center on North Korean side resumed.

By late August 2026, significant progress had been made in the construction of buildings at the North Korean customs and immigration area; satellite imagery showed the exterior nearing completion. A large decorated archway had also been constructed on North Korean side over the roadway on the end of the bridge.

On 7 September, the North Korean customs and immigration area was complete. By late September, satellite imagery showed signs of activity at customs posts on both the North Korean and Chinese sides. Several trucks appeared to cross the bridge for the trial run ahead of the impending opening of the bridge.

== Opening ==
On 15 October 2026, China and North Korea opened the bridge to vehicle traffic. The bridge was formally opened by Ri Ryong-nam (North Korean Ambassador to China), Wang Yajun (Chinese Ambassador to North Korea), and officials from North Pyongan Province and Liaoning Province. Recorded video addresses were delivered at the ceremony by the Premier of China Li Qiang and Premier of North Korea Pak Thae Song. A parade of trucks from both sides crossed the bridge for the opening ceremony. The bridge will be used for cargo only, with passenger traffic continuing by rail or bus along the older Sino-Korean Friendship Bridge.

On 24 October, North Korean leader Kim Jong Un visited Dandong by crossing the New Yalu River Bridge, where he met with Chinese People's Political Consultative Conference National Committee chairman Wang Huning.

== See also ==
- List of international bridges
- Ji'an Yalu River Border Railway Bridge
- Yakov Novichenko Bridge
