= 2026 state visit by Xi Jinping to North Korea =

- Part of China–North Korea relations
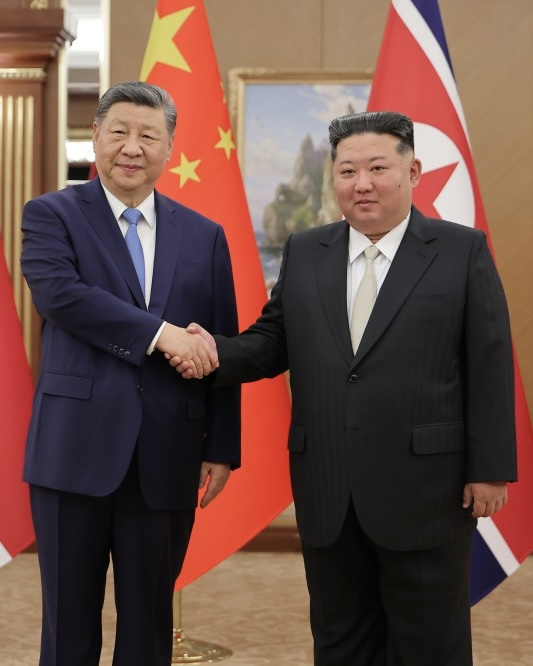
- Date: 8–9 June 2026
- Location: Pyongyang, North Korea
- Participants: Xi Jinping; Kim Jong Un

From 8 to 9 June 2026, Xi Jinping, the general secretary of the Chinese Communist Party and president of China, and his wife Peng Liyuan made a state visit to North Korea, received by Kim Jong Un, the general secretary of the Workers' Party of Korea and the president of the State Affairs Commission, and his wife Ri Sol-ju. This visit was Xi's second state visit to North Korea, as well as his first international visit in 2026. Xi's first state visit North Korea occurred in June 2019. This was also the seventh meeting between Xi and Kim. 2026 also marks the 65th anniversary of the Treaty on Friendship, Cooperation and Mutual Assistance between China and North Korea.

Xi and Peng arrived at the Pyongyang International Airport on 8 June, where they were greeted by Kim and his wife Ri. Xi later attended a welcome ceremony at the Kim Il Sung Square, where he was welcomed by the Korean People's Army and inspected the honor guards with Kim. Following the ceremony, Xi and Peng were moved to the Kumsusan State Guest House; there, Xi held a meeting with Kim. Xi and Peng also attended a state banquet at Mokran House and watched an artistic performance at the Pyongyang Gymnasium. On 9 June, Xi and Kim visited the Sino-Korean Friendship Tower and the Central Cadres Training School of the Workers' Party of Korea. Xi concluded his state visit on the same day.

== Background ==
In April 2026, Chinese foreign minister Wang Yi visited North Korea, where he met with foreign minister Choe Son-hui and North Korean leader Kim Jong Un. On 20 May 2026, Time and Yonhap News Agency reported Chinese leader Xi Jinping would visit North Korea in late May or early June as a response to Japan's measures to strengthen its military. On 5 June 2026, the International Department of the Chinese Communist Party announced that Xi would make a state visit to North Korea from 8 to 9 June. Ministry of Foreign Affairs spokesperson Mao Ning said that Xi and Kim Jong Un "will exchange views on bilateral relations and issues of common concern".

On 8 June, the Rodong Sinmun published an editorial titled "We Warmly Welcome the Friendly Envoy of the Chinese People", which said "Our people warmly welcome Comrade Xi Jinping, who is once again visiting us with the sincere friendship of the fraternal Chinese people" and added "Our people hope that the Chinese people, united firmly around Comrade Xi Jinping as the core of the Communist Party of China, will achieve even greater success in the struggle to comprehensively build a modern socialist power". Rodong Sinmun also published an editorial by Xi, who said "I am convinced that, with the top leaders at the helm, the great vessel of China-DPRK relations will surely ride the wind and waves and forge bravely ahead", and that "We must oppose hegemony, authoritarianism and all attempts and conspiracies to revive militarism that endanger regional security and stability".

== Visit ==
=== 8 June ===
In preparation of the visit, Pyongyang was donned with portraits of Xi Jinping and flags of China and North Korea, as well as banners in Korean and Chinese celebrating the relationship between the two nations. Slogans included "eternal friendship between North Korea and China" and "Long Live the Unbreakable Friendship and Unity between North Korea and China".

Xi and his wife Peng Liyuan arrived at the Pyongyang International Airport by an Air China jet, where they were greeted by Kim Jong Un and his wife Ri Sol-ju, as well as Chinese ambassador to North Korea Wang Yajun. Two children presented flowers to Xi and Peng. Other members of the Chinese delegation include Chinese Communist Party General Office director Cai Qi, foreign minister Wang Yi, defense minister Dong Jun, National Development and Reform Commission chairman Zheng Shanjie, commerce minister Wang Wentao, head of the CCP International Department Liu Haixing, and Central Policy Research Office director Tang Fangyu. North Korean delegation included foreign minister Choe Son-hui, Workers' Party of Korea International Department director Kim Song-nam, WPK Organization Department director Kim Jae-ryong and WPK Propaganda and Agitation Department director Ri Il-hwan, defense minister No Kwang-chol and first vice premier Kim Tok-hun.

Xi afterwards set off towards central Pyongyang in a Hongqi armored limousine, codenamed N701, followed by a second identical vehicle, escorted by a large motorcade of North Korean security personnel in black SUVs and motorcycle outriders. Passing through the Hwasong district, Xi eventually arrived at Kim Il Sung Square. There, he attended a welcome ceremony, where the Korean People's Army welcomed Xi with a 21-gun salute while a band played the national anthems of North Korea and China. Xi and Kim also inspected the honor guards of North Korea's three armed services. The honor guards shouted "wishing Comrade Xi Jinping good health". In addition, thousands of North Korean workers and schoolchildren wearing suits, dresses and hanbok were at the square, waving flags, bouquets of flowers and balloons which were released into the air the conclusion of the ceremony. Following the ceremony, Xi and Peng were moved to the Kumsusan State Guest House, where North Korean people lined up on both sides of the road waving in order to welcome them.

During a meeting with Kim, Xi said China and North Korea "should consolidate the foundation of political mutual trust and enhance the level of practical cooperation". Stating he "is very pleased to once again visit the beautiful city of Pyongyang", he called on China and North Korea to strengthen ties and noted both nations are "both socialist countries led by communist parties". He added "No matter how the international situation changes, the firm stance of the Chinese Party and government in highly valuing the traditional friendship between China and the DPRK will not change and that "The unwavering support for the socialist cause of the DPRK led by Comrade General Secretary Kim Jong Un will not change; and the firm determination to safeguard the common interests and favourable strategic environment of both China and the DPRK will not change". In turn, Xi called Kim "the most respected guest of the DPRK people", and said Xi's choice for to visit North Korea as his first trip abroad this year was a "tremendous encouragement". He hailed the "unique nature" of the relationship, stating it was "the nation’s foremost, top-priority strategic undertaking", and called for further cooperation on areas of trade, infrastructure, technology, education and people-to-people exchanges. He also pledged support for the one China principle and the policies of the Chinese Communist Party.

Xi and Peng also attended a state banquet at Mokran House. At the banquet, Xi said the two nations agreed to increase their relationship "to a higher level" and said two nations were "linked by mountains and rivers and share a common destiny", describing China as "a good neighbor, good friend and good comrade" to North Korea. Kim said they had "exchanged wide-ranging views on international and regional issues of common concern". He said he hoped Xi and the CCP would achieve "even greater transformation" in efforts to build a "powerful, modern socialist country". Xi and Kim also watched an artistic performance at the Pyongyang Gymnasium. The songs performed included the "Ode to the Motherland" and the "Shining Motherland", continuing with songs celebrating Xi's leadership, with the final song being "The DPRK-China Friendship Shall Last Forever".

=== 9 June ===
On the morning of 9 June, Xi and Kim, along with their wives, visited the Sino-Korean Friendship Tower. There, honor guards placed a floral basket with a ribbon that contained the words "The martyrs of the Chinese People’s Volunteer Army are immortal". Xi then straightened the ribbon before they observed a moment of silence. Kim also showed Xi historical documents, photographs and oil paintings within the tower that depicted Chinese and North Korean soldiers fighting together during the Korean War and helping rebuild North Korea. The two agreed that "the shared battles of the 1950s remained an eternal historical memory for both nations" and added they would jointly maintain memorial facilities and expand revolutionary education so that new generations and close ties would be carried forward. Afterwards, Xi and Kim visited the Central Cadres Training School of the Workers' Party of Korea. There, they listened to a lecture and toured the campus with an electric vehicle. They also planted a fir tree which symbolized the "evergreen friendship" between the two nations.

On the afternoon of 9 June, Xi concluded his state visit and departed North Korea through the airport. Kim and his wife also went to the airport to see of Xi and his wife, and there was a grand farewell ceremony in their honor. Xi returned to Beijing on the afternoon.

== See also ==
- Kim–Xi meetings
- List of international trips made by Xi Jinping
