= Kim–Xi meetings =

Seven meetings of North Korea's Kim Jong Un and China's Xi Jinping

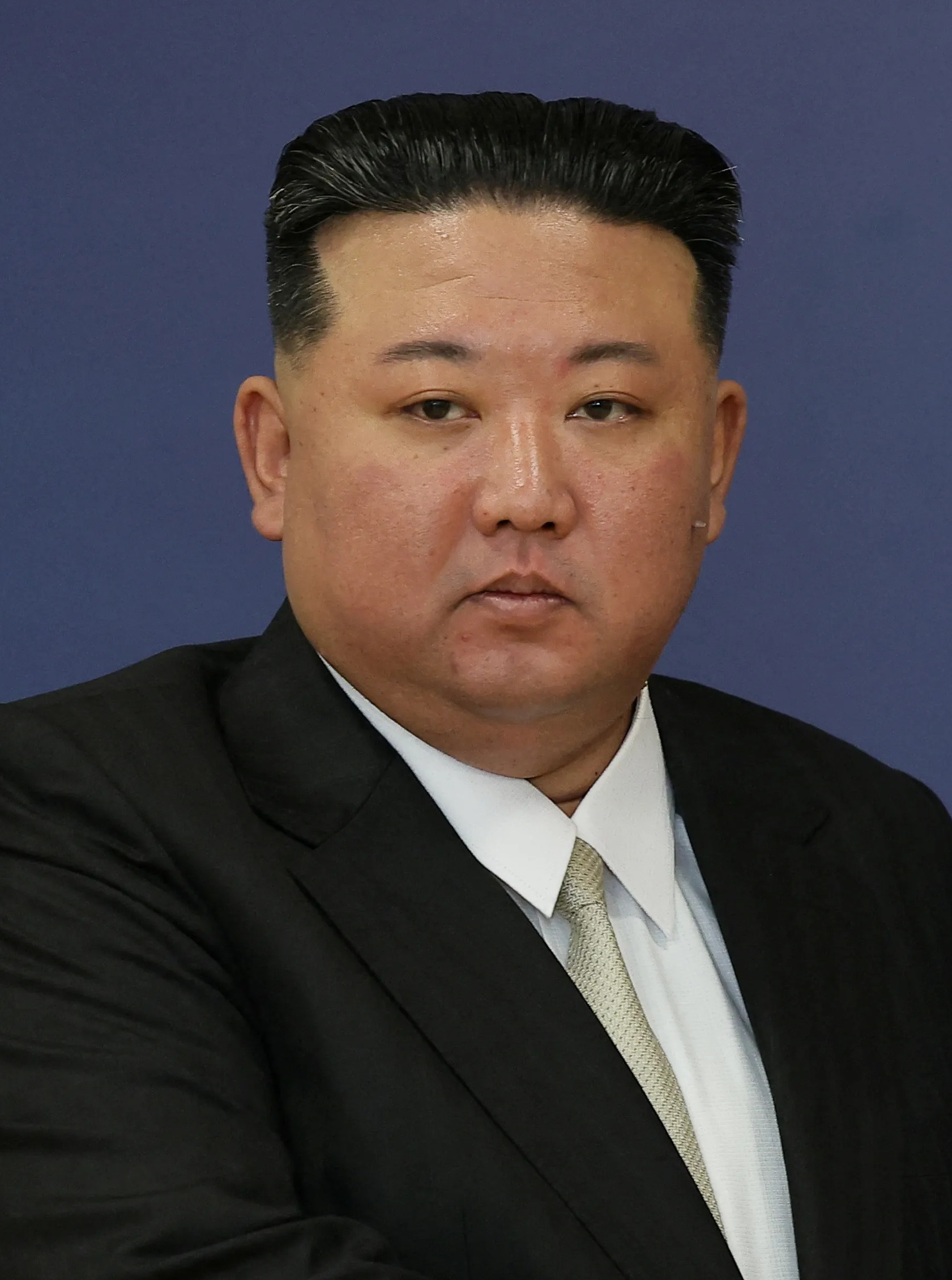
Meeting between General Secretary of the Workers' Party of Korea Kim Jong Un (left) and General Secretary of the Chinese Communist Party Xi Jinping (right)

The Kim–Xi meetings were a series of summits between North Korea and China during 2018, 2019, 2025 and 2026. North Korean leader Kim Jong Un met with Chinese leader Xi Jinping on March 25–28, 2018. Xi made a classified invitation to Kim to visit China, after which Kim visited Beijing and used his bullet proof train to travel to the three-day meeting. It is his first known foreign diplomatic trip since taking power. Kim and Xi had a second surprise meeting on May 7–8, 2018 in the city of Dalian. Kim and Xi had a third surprise meeting on June 19–20, 2018. They had a fourth surprise meeting on January 7–10, 2019 in Beijing, followed by a fifth official North Korea and China summit June 20–21, 2019 in Government Complex No. 1 in Pyongyang. In September 2025, Kim visited China to attend the 2025 Victory Day Parade, where he also met with Xi. In June 2026, Xi visited North Korea, where he met with Kim.

== First meeting (2018) ==
First meeting
- Date: March 25–28, 2018
- Location: Zhongnanhai, Beijing, China
- Participants: (China) Xi Jinping (General Secretary) (North Korea) Kim Jong Un (Chairman)

The first China–North Korea meeting in 2018 was organized by the invitation from Xi Jinping, General Secretary of the Chinese Communist Party. On March 25–28, 2018, North Korean leader Kim Jong Un arrived in Beijing by special train and met with Xi. This was Kim Jong Un's first public unofficial visit to a foreign country in six years since he took power at the end of 2011. Xinhua News Agency reported that North Korea was "committed to denuclearization" and was willing to hold talks with the United States.

During the meeting, Kim officially invited Xi to Pyongyang at a time convenient for him, and Xi accepted the invitation. During the confidential summit schedule, Xi presented and explained the list of the presents to Kim, who also prepared several gifts and described their details for Xi. Kim told Xi: “The friendship between North Korea and China is invaluable. I am willing to work with Comrade General Secretary to follow the lofty will of the older generation of leaders, inherit and develop the friendship between North Korea and China that has remained true to its nature despite the trials and tribulations, and push it to a new height under the new circumstances. North Korea and China are both communist countries with a long history, and there are many ways to cooperate in various aspects in the future.” Xi urged Kim to strengthen the strategic and diplomatic future partnership between China and North Korea. Kim stressed to Xi that North Korea and China are long-established socialist countries and that there are many ways to cooperate in various aspects in the future.

=== Reactions ===
Regarding North Korea nuclear weapons crisis with a diplomatic solution and Beijing's issue with the United States trade war, the two leaders meeting might be substantial leverage for answering to a puzzle of resolution to both two long-lasting socialist countries.

The Chinese state news agency, Xinhua, quoted Kim's statement: "The issue of denuclearization of the Korean Peninsula is resolved, and South Korea and the United States respond to our efforts with goodwill, create an atmosphere of peace and stability while taking progressive and synchronous measures for the realization of peace." U.S. President Trump's new national security advisor, John Bolton, stated he would not adopt the unreasonable solution, which included sheer costs for North Korea's denuclearization (e.g., withdrawal of U.S. troops from the Korean peninsula or mutual denuclearization for both the North Korea and United States) after Kim-Xi summit.

== Second meeting (2018) ==
Second meeting
- Date: May 7–8, 2018
- Location: Dalian, Liaoning, China
- Participants: (China) Xi Jinping (General Secretary) (North Korea) Kim Jong Un (Chairman)

Kim Jong Un met Xi Jinping for the second time in Dalian, Liaoning on May 7–8, 2018. The two leaders discussed how to cooperate at the communist level on denuclearization, and peace on the Korean peninsula. They also discussed China–DPRK relations and significant issues of common concern, Xinhua reported. U.S. President Trump emphasized that China should cooperate with the U.S.'s continued implementation of economic sanctions, with commercial and financial penalties on North Korea until it permanently dismantles its nuclear weapons and ICBM missile programs. This was the second time CCP General Secretary Xi Jinping had met Kim Jong Un in two months, and Xi Jinping reaffirmed his state visit to Pyongyang by the end of 2018.

== Third meeting (2018) ==
Third meeting
- Date: June 19–20, 2018
- Location: Zhongnanhai, Beijing, China
- Participants: (China) Xi Jinping (General Secretary) (North Korea) Kim Jong Un (Chairman)

Kim Jong Un met with Xi Jinping in Beijing on June 19–20, 2018. Kim was speculated to have sought advice from Xi about a future, mutually beneficial negotiation strategy between the DPRK and United States. Chinese party and government leaders such as Li Keqiang, Wang Huning, and Wang Qishan participated in the meeting with Kim Jong Un.

Xi Jinping highly praised Chairman Kim Jong Un’s special visit to China and also highly praised the positive results achieved by Chairman Kim Jong Un’s meeting with US President Trump in Singapore. Kim Jong Un said that General Secretary Xi Jinping is a great leader whom North Korea respects and trusts very much. He thanked General Secretary Xi Jinping and China for their friendship and support for him and North Korea. He said he would lead the Workers’ Party to implement the consensus reached with General Secretary Xi Jinping.

Before the talks, Xi Jinping and his wife Peng Liyuan held a welcoming ceremony for Kim Jong Un and his wife Ri Sol-ju. They also attended a welcoming banquet and watched a performance together. North Korean leaders including Choe Ryong-hae, vice chairman of the Workers' Party of Korea, Pak Pong-ju, premier of the cabinet, Ri Su-yong, director of the International Department of the Workers' Party of Korea, Kim Yong-chol, director of the United Front Department of the Workers' Party of Korea, Pak Thae-song, director of the Science and Education Department of the Workers' Party of Korea, No Kwang-chol, minister of the People's Armed Forces, and Ri Yong-ho, minister of foreign affairs, participated in the relevant activities.

In the past, when the top leader of North Korea visited China, the news was released by the state media of both countries after the North Korean personnel returned home. This time, the convention was broken. Shortly after Kim Jong Un arrived in Beijing on June 19, the Chinese official media promptly released the news of Kim Jong Un's visit to China and followed up with reports in a timely manner. North Korean state media also promptly reported on Kim Jong Un's trip.

== Fourth meeting (2019) ==
Fourth meeting
- Date: January 7–10, 2019
- Location: Zhongnanhai, Beijing, China
- Participants: (China) Xi Jinping (General Secretary) (North Korea) Kim Jong Un (Chairman)

Kim Jong Un, accompanied by his wife Ri Sol-ju, visited China on January 7–10, 2019, where he met with Xi Jinping in Beijing. The trip began on Kim's 35th birthday. It is suspected by many that Kim Jong Un was briefing Xi Jinping on the upcoming Trump-Kim summit in Hanoi, Vietnam and seeking advice. Kim transited China via train during the journey to Vietnam. After arriving in Beijing on January 9, Kim Jong Un and Xi Jinping held talks at the Great Hall of the People to discuss deepening China–North Korea relations and the second DPRK-US summit. Subsequently, Xi Jinping and his wife Peng Liyuan hosted a welcome banquet for Kim Jong Un and Ri Sol-ju, and the group watched a cultural performance together.

On the morning of January 9, Xi Jinping met with Kim Jong Un again at the Beijing Hotel. Peng Liyuan and Ri Sol-ju attended the meeting. Afterwards, the two sides had lunch together. Subsequently, Kim Jong Un visited the Beijing Tongrentang Yizhuang Pharmaceutical Factory to inspect the traditional Chinese medicine manufacturing process and modern processing production line. In the afternoon, Kim Jong Un and his entourage left Beijing by train from Beijing Station and arrived in Pyongyang on the morning of January 10 via Dandong.

== Fifth meeting (2019) ==
Fifth meeting
- Date: June 20–21, 2019
- Location: Government Complex No. 1, Pyongyang, North Korea
- Participants: (China) Xi Jinping (General Secretary) (North Korea) Kim Jong Un (Chairman)

Xi Jinping visited Kim Jong Un in the North Korean capital of Pyongyang on June 20–21, 2019. It was the first official visit by a Chinese leader to the country since Hu Jintao's visit 14 years prior and the first one for Xi personally since his visit to North Korea as Vice President and CCP Politburo Standing Committee member in 2008. Xi Jinping was met at Pyongyang International Airport by Chairman Kim where he received full military honours including a 21-gun salute and a march-past by the Supreme Guard Command Honor Guard Battalion and the Central Military Band of the Korean People's Army. He also became the first Chinese leader to visit the Kumsusan Palace of the Sun. The following evening, Xi and Kim witnessed a performance of the Korean People's Army State Merited Chorus and Symphony Orchestra at the reopening of the 2019 Arirang Mass Games at Rungrado 1st of May Stadium.

== Sixth meeting (2025) ==
Sixth meeting
- Date: September 2–4, 2025
- Location: Beijing, China
- Participants: (China) Xi Jinping (General Secretary) (North Korea) Kim Jong Un (General Secretary)

On September 2, 2025, Kim Jong Un, accompanied by many other North Korean dignitaries, traveled to Beijing by special train to attend the 80th anniversary of the China Victory Day Parade, marking his first visit to China since 2019, as well as the first time he attended a multilateral event. At about 8:18 am on September 3, Kim Jong Un arrived at Duanmen Gate on the north side of Tiananmen Square to attend the military parade. During the visit, he met with CCP General Secretary Xi Jinping alongside Russian President Vladimir Putin.

== Seventh meeting (2026) ==
From 8 to 9 June 2026, Xi Jinping, the general secretary of the Chinese Communist Party and president of China, and his wife Peng Liyuan made a state visit to North Korea, received by Kim Jong Un, the general secretary of the Workers' Party of Korea and the president of the State Affairs Commission, and his wife Ri Sol-ju. This visit was Xi's second state visit to North Korea, as well as his first international visit in 2026. Xi's first state visit North Korea occurred in June 2019. This was also the seventh meeting between Xi and Kim. 2026 also marks the 65th anniversary of the Treaty on Friendship, Cooperation and Mutual Assistance between China and North Korea.

Xi and Peng arrived at the Pyongyang International Airport on 8 June, where they were greeted by Kim and his wife Ri. Xi later attended a welcome ceremony at the Kim Il Sung Square, where he was welcomed by the Korean People's Army and inspected the honor guards with Kim. Following the ceremony, Xi and Peng were moved to the Kumsusan State Guest House; there, Xi held a meeting with Kim. Xi and Peng also attended a state banquet at Mokran House and watched an artistic performance at the Pyongyang Gymnasium. On 9 June, Xi and Kim visited the Sino-Korean Friendship Tower and the Central Cadres Training School of the Workers' Party of Korea. Xi concluded his state visit on the same day.

== See also ==
- China–North Korea relations
- List of international trips made by Kim Jong Un
- List of international trips made by Xi Jinping
- Kim–Putin meetings, unofficial North Korea–Russia summit
