= China–North Korea relations =

- China: North Korea

Diplomatic mission
- Chinese Embassy, Pyongyang: North Korean Embassy, Beijing

Envoy
- Ambassador Wang Yajun: Ambassador Ri Ryong-nam

The People's Republic of China (PRC) and the Democratic People's Republic of Korea (DPRK) established diplomatic relations on 6 October 1949, five days after the proclamation of the PRC. In 1950, China intervened in the Korean War through the People's Volunteer Army after the North Korean forces had been defeated by United Nations Forces in the Korean War, successfully ensuring North Korea's survival. In 1961, China and North Korea signed a mutual aid and co-operation treaty, which is currently the only defense pact China has with any nation. North Korea attempted to not take sides during the Sino-Soviet split, though relations deteriorated during the Cultural Revolution, leading North Korea to move closer to the Soviet Union. Though improving in the 1970s, the relations weakened after China refused North Korean plans to reinvade South Korea, after the Khmer Rouge victory at the Fall of Phnom Penh.

The relations deteriorated further in the 1980s when China began reform and opening up, which led China to open up to Western countries and their allies including South Korea, which led to the full normalization of diplomatic relations with the south in 1992. The reform and opening up also led China to decrease economic aid to North Korea, though China gave aid during the 1990s North Korean famine. The dissolution of the Soviet Union increased North Korea's dependence on China. In the 21st century, relations declined due to North Korea's nuclear weapons program, which China opposed. China condemned the 2006 North Korean nuclear test, as well as the subsequent nuclear tests in 2009, 2013, January 2016, September 2016 and 2017. China supported or abstained from several United Nations Security Council resolutions on sanctions on North Korea, leading them to be approved. Relations have again been increasingly close since 2018, with North Korean leader Kim Jong Un making multiple trips to Beijing to meet Chinese Communist Party (CCP) general secretary Xi Jinping, who himself visited Pyongyang in 2019 and 2026. During the 2020s, China started omitting mentioning denuclearization of the Korean Peninsula.

The two countries officially describe their relationship as a traditional friendly and cooperative relationship. China maintains an embassy in the North Korean capital of Pyongyang and a consulate general in Chongjin. The embassy of North Korea in China is located in Beijing's Chaoyang District, while a consulate general is in Shenyang. China is by far North Korea's largest trading partner, with more than 90 percent of North Korea's imports coming from China, while North Korea is a significant recipient of overseas Chinese aid. As socialist states ruled by communist parties, the two nations retain ideological ties. North Korea has adhered to the one China principle, recognizing the PRC as the only representative of China and Taiwan as part of China. North Korea also supports China's policies in Xinjiang, Tibet and Hong Kong, and rejects interference in China's internal affairs.

== History ==
Paramount leaders of China and Supreme leaders of North Korea since 1950

=== Background ===
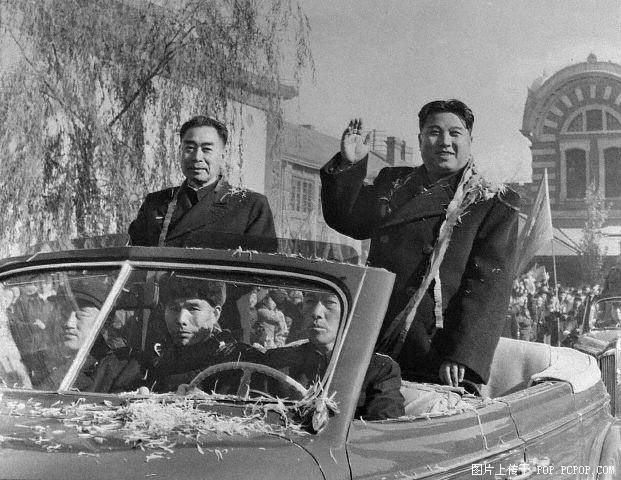
North Korea's prime minister Kim Il Sung and China's premier Zhou Enlai tour Beijing in 1958.

Relations between China and North Korea began in the 1940s before the two even became formal states. Many future senior officials of the Workers' Party of Korea, including Kim Il Sung, had once been members of the Chinese Communist Party (CCP). Chinese foreign minister Qian Qichen stated in his book Ten Diplomatic Records that the traditional friendship between China and North Korea was formed when Kim Il Sung and other Koreans participated in the Anti-Japanese War in Northeast China during the 1930s and 1940s. After World War II, after decades of Japanese occupation, the northern half of Korea was placed under Soviet administration. In 1948, the Democratic People's Republic of Korea (DPRK) was officially established.

During the Chinese Civil War, the CCP was struggling to make gains in South Manchuria. Due to North Korea's proximity to South Manchuria, the CCP leaned on the DPRK for support. After military failures in Andong and Tonghua, 15,000 wounded Chinese Communist soldiers were taken in by North Korean families. When the CCP had to withdraw, they left 20,000 tons of vital supplies with the Koreans. Between late 1947 and early 1948, the Koreans helped transport more than 520,000 tons of goods to the CCP, even suspending passenger services to ensure their arrival, and immensely lowering fees had they not already been exempt from them. To return the favor, in late 1946, when Kim Il-sung asked the CCP for aid because of famine in North Korea, they sent 10,000 tons of grain through gifts and trade within the year. In addition to this, the CCP lead thousands of ethnic Koreans in the People's Liberation Army (PLA) back to Korea, strengthening the up-and-coming Korean People's Army (KPA). The People's Republic of China (PRC) was established a year later when the CCP won the Chinese Civil War. The PRC was founded on 1 October 1949. The People's Republic of China and the Democratic People's Republic of Korea exchanged diplomatic recognition on 6 October 1949 with the PRC recognizing the DPRK as the sole legitimate authority of Korea.

=== Korean War ===
In April 1950, Soviet leader Joseph Stalin put pressure on Kim Il Sung to gain Chinese approval for an invasion of South Korea, stating:

If you should get kicked in the teeth, I shall not lift a finger. You have to ask Mao for all the help.

Kim Il Sung made a secret visit to Beijing in May 1950 and met with CCP leaders for the first time on 13 May. No official records of the meeting survive but the Chinese learned that North Korea planned to invade South Korea. Afterward, Mao demanded an "urgent answer" and "personal clarifications" from Stalin regarding Soviet support and emphasized that the CCP needed to be involved in the decision making; the request was relayed through N. V. Roshchin, the Soviet ambassador to China. Although it is not clear as to when or how signing a Sino-DPRK alliance treaty was brought up beforehand, it was around this time that Mao proposed to Stalin to postpone signing until after Korea's unification. Some historians believe that Chinese leader Mao Zedong needed reassurances from Stalin because he lacked confidence in Kim. According to Nikita Khrushchev's memoirs, China approved North Korea's plans. In other sources, Mao did not approve the plan in advance, and was concerned that it would provoke an American response and that China might become involved in the conflict.

Even though the Koreans saw American intervention as unlikely, Mao ensured a North Korean diplomat that, if the US entered the conflict, China would send assistance. On 25 June 1950, the North invaded the South. Within days, American forces were sent to the peninsula. Shortly after, the Soviet Ambassador to China reported in a telegram to Stalin that the Chinese felt frustrated that the "Korean comrades [had] underestimated the possibility of American armed intervention". At the time, the PRC was in a difficult position. It was barely one year old, and the majority of its military forces were in south China, opposite Taiwan, over 1,000 miles away. As soon as North Korea invaded, the United States deployed forces not only to Korea but also to the Taiwan strait. Therefore, the PRC faced potential conflicts with America on two fronts. Despite this, it was clear that China–North Korea border assumed great strategic value for the Chinese Communist Party: Japan had invaded China through Korea twice in the First Sino-Japanese War and during the Japanese invasion of Manchuria, and it was feared the US could do the same. Supporting them militarily could also allow the CCP to boost their influence within North Korea and help direct the development of Korean communism.

At a meeting with the Politburo on 4 August 1950, Mao said,

"If the American imperialists are victorious, they will become dizzy with success, and then be in a position to threaten us. We have to help [North] Korea; we have to assist them."

The next day, Mao gave the military a deadline: be ready for combat in Korea "by the end of the month". However, more time was needed to prepare, and the date was delayed. On 30 September, US forces invaded North Korea, representing a significant turning point in the war. On 1 October 1950, Kim Il Sung held an emergency meeting with the Chinese ambassador to the North, Ni Zhiliang, petitioning for their urgent entry into the conflict. Stalin also asked China to send troops. On 2 October, Mao rejected sending troops, saying Chinese troops were not prepared well enough and that an intervention could trigger a world war with the United States. After being pushed by Stalin, Mao reconsidered his decision, and sent Kim Il Sung a telegram on 8 October that Chinese aid would be coming. On 12 October, Mao again said China would not send troops but finally agreed to intervene on 13 October. On 19 October, Chinese forces crossed into North Korea. The same day, Pyongyang fell to the Americans.

China sent over one million People's Volunteer Army to aid in the war effort. In addition to dispatching military personnel, China also received North Korean refugees and students and provided economic aid during the war. Then, Douglas MacArthur defied US and UN orders and pushed towards the Yalu River, which enlarged the conflict when Chinese forces fought back and caught the UN forces by surprise, resulting them to retreat back to the 38th parallel. Chinese soldiers were able to retake Pyongyang and later took Seoul in 1951, though U.S. forces later recaptured the latter city. Eventually, the conflict turned into a stalemate and also the current boundary between North Korea and South Korea.

Following the signing of the Korean Armistice Agreement in 1953, China, along with members of the Eastern Bloc led by the Soviet Union, provided extensive economic assistance to Pyongyang to support the reconstruction and economic development of North Korea. After the war China continued to station 300,000 troops in North Korea for five years. National Defense Minister and commander of the Chinese forces in Korea Peng Dehuai urged Mao to remove Kim from power, but he was sidelined after he criticized the Great Leap Forward. The war had allowed the newly established PRC to demonstrate that they will not bow to American military might, and will intervene when needed. This meant that their relationship with North Korea became an important element of China-U.S. relations.

=== Relations during the Cold War ===
==== 1950s ====
In 1956, at the 2nd Plenary Session of the 3rd Central Committee, leading pro-China Korean figures known as the Yan'an faction attempted to remove Kim Il Sung from power with the support of China and the Soviet Union, but failed. This incident has become known as the August faction incident and forms the historical basis for North Korean fears of Chinese interference. A joint Soviet-Chinese delegation co-headed by Anastas Mikoyan and Peng Dehuai were sent to Pyongyang to instruct Kim Il Sung to cease any purge and reinstate the leaders of the Yan'an and Soviet factions in September 1956, leading Kim to backtack partially. At the same time, China tried to maintain good relations with North Korea because of the Sino-Soviet split and de-Stalinization. In May 1957, during a meeting with Kim, Mao said China had been wrong to intervene in the WPK's internal affairs and that there would not be interventions like the Mikoyan–Peng delegation again. On 28 October 1958, Chinese troops fully withdrew from North Korea. In 1959, China and North Korea signed a nuclear co-operation agreement.

==== 1960s ====
Initially, the 1960s began with the two nations strengthening their alliance. As Sino-Soviet relations turned sour, China and North Korea gradually warmed to each other, as they were closer ideologically than their eastern European counterparts, and shared a common enemy: the United States. In 1961, the two countries signed the Sino-North Korean Mutual Aid and Cooperation Friendship Treaty, whereby China pledged to immediately render military and other assistance by all means to its ally against any outside attack. This agreement was renewed in 1981, 2001 and 2021. As of at least 2024, North Korea is the only country with which China has a formal alliance. On 28 October 1968, Rodong Sinmun published an article titled Let Us Defend the Socialist Camp, which took a pro-Chinese and anti-Soviet line by condemning "do not distinguish between their revolutionary comrades and class enemies" and seek amicable relations with the West. The article also said the Soviet Union could not represent the socialist bloc alone, and that attempts to isolate China were attempts to divide the socialist camp.

However, the 1960s have also been characterized as a "contentious" period in China-North Korean relations. After China detonated their first nuclear device in October 1964, a North Korean delegation visited Beijing to seek assistance with their own nuclear programme, but they were rebuffed and returned to Pyongyang empty-handed. In the autumn of 1965, Kim Il Sung, who was preparing to launch a new war to take over South Korea, told Chinese ambassador Hao Deqing "sooner or later, there will be a fight in Korea" and asked for the Chinese army to participate in it. Kim's plans were ultimately shelved after China refused to support them, leading to a deterioration of relations between China and North Korea.

After Cultural Revolution was launched in May 1966, relations between China and North Korea deteriorated rapidly. Inspired by the Cultural Revolution, students from the Chinese diaspora in Pyongyang organized a patriotic hike by waving the Chinese flag and shouting "Long live Chairman Mao!" and "Long live the Communist Party!". The WPK secretary of the school attempted to stop them, but the students stormed the secretary's office on 23 August, leading North Korea to close the school. The Workers' Party of Korea also criticized the Cultural Revolution and described Mao Zedong as "an old fool who has gone out of his mind". Red Guards referred to Kim Il Sung as a "fat revisionist". North Korea installed posters with anti-Mao slogans along the border with China, which remained until 1968. China pressured North Korea to relinquish parts of the Paektu Mountain, threatening a military intervention. China recalled its ambassador from Pyongyang in October 1966, and the Red Guards criticized North Korea as being "revisionist" in the Dongfanghong newspaper. Tensions between Chinese Red Guards and North Korea led to some armed clashes between 1968 and 1969, with ethnic Koreans in Yanbian massacred by Red Guards. North Korea threatened to cut the Chinese diaspora from the country's public distribution system if they did not leave North Korea or naturalized, leading to their near-total decimation.

==== 1970s ====
In the 1970s, relations between China and North Korea improved. In April 1970, Chinese premier Zhou Enlai traveled to Pyongyang to apologize for their treatment of North Korea. When speaking about the two nations' "blood-cemented" friendship, Zhou stated, "China and Korea are neighbors as closely related as lips and teeth". Mao and Kim again started to call each other "Great Leader". On 4 February 1971, North Korean state media published an article titled Let Us Adhere to Proletarian Dictatorship and Proletarian Democracy, which mirrored the Rodong Sinmun article from 1968. Former North Korean Chinese were also allowed to restore their citizenship.

In addition, Japan's growing alliance with the U.S. threatened both China and North Korea, bringing them both closer together. In November 1969, the U.S. and Japan released a joint statement stating America's hope for Japan to become a key ally in Asia, along with emphasizing the importance of Taiwan and South Korea in Japanese national security. Shortly after, in June 1970, the U.S.-Japan Security Treaty was extended, allowing American military bases to continue operation in Japan, and ensuring that they would both act to defend each other in the event of a war. This encroaching Japanese influence compelled China to declare their approval of North Korea's "eight-point program for the peaceful unification of Korea" and to advocate for the disbandment of the UN Commission for the Unification of Korea in 1972. In 1973, the Pyongyang Metro was constructed with Chinese assistance.

In the 1970s, the North's aims to unify the peninsula were reignited when they saw the success of the Communist Party of Vietnam in reunifying their nation. Kim met with Mao in April 1975 after the end of the Vietnam War. North Korea maintained strong diplomatic, military, and material support for Angkar ("The Organization") and the Khmer Rouge ("The Cambodian Reds") before, during, and after the establishment of Democratic Kampuchea following the end of the Cambodian Civil War, Pyongyang was one of the very few capitals to maintain an active embassy after the Fall of Phnom Penh led by Saloth Sâr ("Pol Pot", a French pseudonym for "Politique Potentielle"), providing the isolated regime with a rare window to the outside world. According to Chinese historian Shen Zhihua, Kim was interested in another war to conquer South Korea after the Communist victory in Vietnam, but Mao refused to discuss the matter. China did not approve of any military action which could aggravate relations with the United States, and urged the Koreans to find peaceful means of reunification. According to Japanese historian Masao Okonogi, the lack of Chinese support caused North Korea to adopt an independent approach to national defence and develop nuclear weapons. While the 1970s largely represented the growing solidarity between China and North Korea, there were still tensions. For example, Deng Xiaoping urged political and economic reforms after the reform and opening up and criticized the North Korean cult of personality and provocative actions such as the Rangoon bombing. Deng Xiaoping attended North Korea's 30th anniversary celebrations in 1978 in his official capacities as Vice Premier and Vice Chairman of the Chinese Communist Party.

==== 1980s ====
The 1980s brought a turning point for North Korea's relationship with China. First formulated by Deng Xiaoping in 1978, in the 1980s the reform and opening up became a reality, allowing trade with the West to boom on an unprecedented level. The reform and opening up placed North Korea in an insecure position, as they perceived the policy as a betrayal of fundamental communist principles, whilst simultaneously diminishing North Korea's importance as a trade partner. North Korea's vulnerability was enhanced further as China began to strengthen ties with South Korea. In collaboration with South Korean company Daewoo, China hoped to start the Fuzhou Refrigerator Company as a joint economic venture between the two nations. The North objected fiercely to this partnership, causing China to postpone the project. However, China still pushed on, with production lines opening in June 1988. As a result of growing tensions and China's open door, bilateral trade between North Korea and China declined 14% between 1989 and 1990.

==== 1990s ====
After the fall of the Soviet bloc, China became North Korea's biggest trading partner, but the alliance faced fresh challenges. In 1992, relations worsened after China increased trade relations with North Korea's rival South Korea in the 1980s, culminating with the full normalization of diplomatic relations in 1992. The North Koreans perceived this as a betrayal of their 'One Korea' policy, as they were no longer recognised by China as the sole legitimate government on the Korean Peninsula. China subsequently stopped selling goods to North Korea at discounted "friendship prices" and providing interest-free loans, leading to the decline of trade in the 1990s. However, it began subsidizing trade to North Korea again in order to prevent a refugee crisis in Northeast China during the 1990s North Korean famine. From 1994 to 1995, North Korea received around 500,000 tons of grain, 1.3 million tons of oil, and 23 million tons of coal from their northern neighbour. Almost half of this was free of charge and the rest was sold at friendship prices of less than 50% the market rate. In the 1990s, North Korean leader Kim Jong Il published commentaries implicitly accusing China of "betraying socialism". During the period of severe food shortage between 1996 and 1998, Beijing provided unconditional food aid to North Korea.

=== 21st century ===
==== 2000s ====
China facilitated key negotiations between the North and the South. In June 2000, leaders from the two Koreas met for the first time since the Korean War, and beforehand Kim Jong-il took a trip to Beijing to seek support and advice. China also encouraged amnesty between the two nations, discouraging military action. During a visit to Seoul in October 2000, Chinese Premier Zhu Rongji advocated for the "peaceful reunification" of the Korean peninsula. A few months later, in January 2001, CCP General Secretary Jiang Zemin reiterated China's aims to facilitate Korean unification through peaceful means.

Since 2003, China has been a key participant in six-party talks aimed at resolving the issue of North Korea's nuclear weapons programme. China condemned the 2006 North Korean nuclear test and approved United Nations Security Council Resolution 1718 (2006) and United Nations Security Council Resolution 1874 (2009) expanding sanctions against North Korea. However, the extent to which China implemented sanctions in the early 2000s is uncertain. While they enforced sanctions against goods directly associated with their nuclear programmes, they were more lenient on dual use products and showed barely any restraint regarding the import of banned luxury goods.

CCP general secretary Hu Jintao sent Foreign Minister Li Zhaoxing to Pyongyang to negotiate with Kim Jong Il to halt the nuclear program. According to U.S. National Security Council Director for Asian Affairs Victor Cha, Hu Jintao and the Chinese government were genuinely outraged by the test because North Korea had led it to believe that it did not have nuclear weapons and ignored its advice against building them. China was also concerned that the Japanese government would respond by expanding its military. On 1 January 2009, CCP General Secretary Hu Jintao and North Korean leader Kim Jong Il exchanged greetings and declared 2009 as the "year of China–North Korea friendship," marking 60 years of diplomatic relations between the two countries. China condemned the North Korean nuclear test in May 2009, with the foreign ministry stating "The DPRK ignored universal opposition of the international community and once more conducted the nuclear test. The Chinese government is resolutely opposed to it". In June 2009, China voted to approve the United Nations Security Council Resolution 1874, which imposed further sanctions on North Korea.

==== 2010s ====
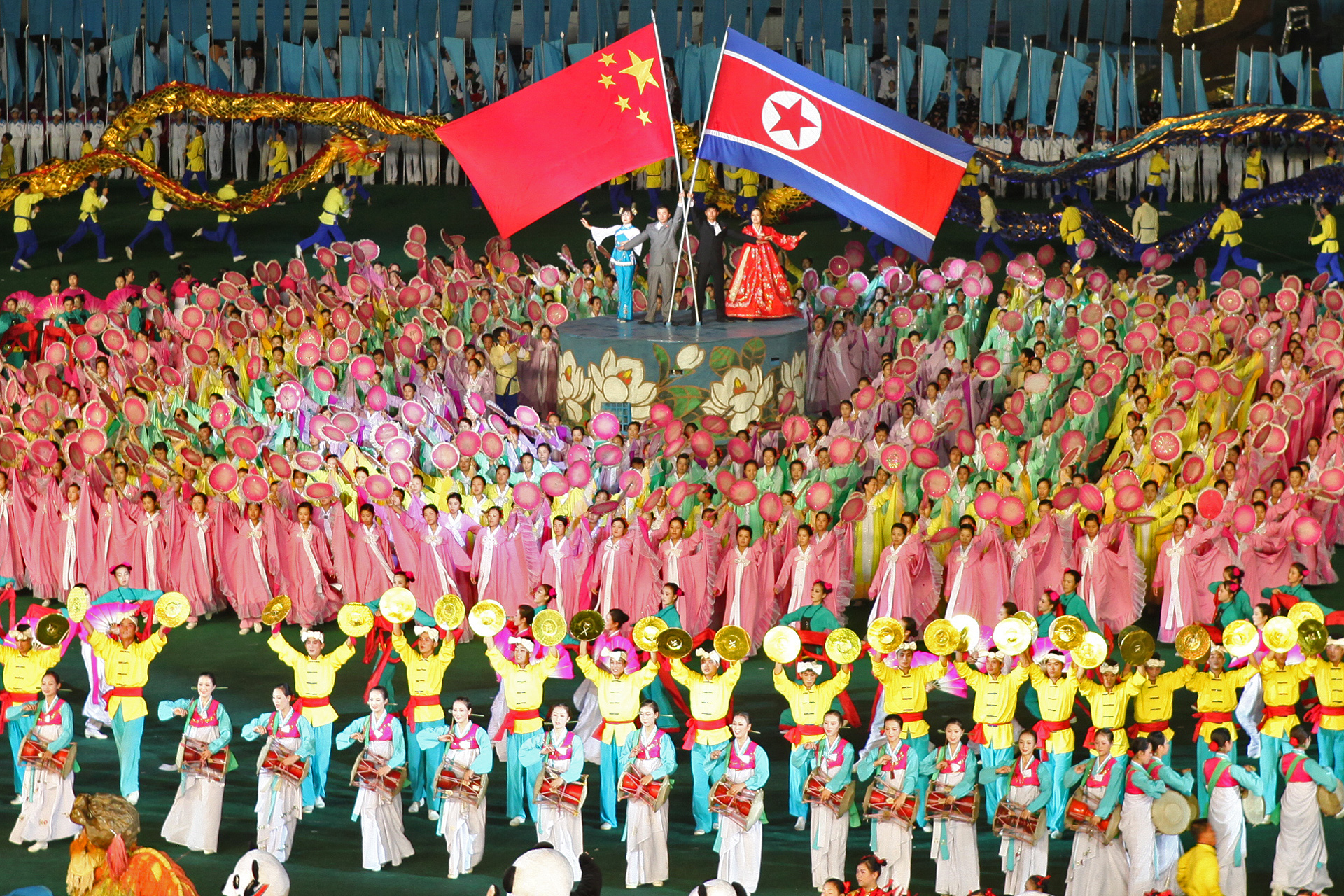
The close China-North Korea relationship is celebrated at the Mass Games in Pyongyang

In March 2010, Kim visited Beijing to meet with the Politburo Standing Committee of the Chinese Communist Party. He returned to Pyongyang empty-handed, without assurances of additional economic relief. North Korea's economic dependence on China grew substantially. In 2000, China represented 24.8% of North Korea's foreign trade but within 10 years this figure ballooned to over 80%.

In August 2012, Jang Song-thaek, uncle of Kim Jong Un, met CCP General Secretary Hu Jintao in Beijing. It has since been widely reported that during their meeting, Jang told Hu Jintao he wished to replace Kim Jong Un with his brother Kim Jong-nam. The meeting was allegedly taped by Zhou Yongkang, then secretary of the Central Political and Legal Affairs Commission, who informed Kim Jong Un of the plot. In December 2013, Jang was executed for treason while in July 2014 Zhou was publicly put under investigation for corruption and other crimes and was arrested in December 2014. These events are said to have marked the beginning of Kim Jong Un's distrust of China, since they had failed to inform him of a plot against his rule, while China took a dislike to Kim for executing their trusted intermediary.

In February 2013, North Korea conducted another nuclear test, which China condemned. On 5 May 2013, North Korea "grabbed", according to Jiang Yaxian, a Chinese government official, another Chinese fishing boat in a series of impounding Chinese fishing boats. "North Korea was demanding 600,000 yuan ($97,600) for its safe return, along with its 16 crew." The Chinese Foreign Minister Yang Jiechi said that China "resolutely" opposed the 2013 North Korean nuclear test conducted by North Korea. The North Korean ambassador to China, Ji Jae-ryong, was personally informed of this position on 12 February 2013 in a meeting with Yang Jiechi.

According to a December 2014 article in The New York Times, relations had reached a low point. In 2016, right after the North Korean nuclear test in January tensions between China and North Korea have further grown, the reaction of China was, "We strongly urge the DPRK side to remain committed to its denuclearization commitment, and stop taking any actions that would make the situation worse," spokesperson Hua Chunying said. On 24 February 2016 the United States and China introduced new sanctions against the North Korean government conducted within the United Nations context. The involvement of the United States in the peninsula's affairs in April–May 2017 presented a major issue for China-American relations in organiser Li Xiaolin's preparations for Xi's visit to the US. In June 2017, China banned the export of dual-use technology to North Korea. On 18 February 2017, Ministry of Commerce and the General Administration of Customs of China jointly announced that in order to comply with UN Sanctions, China would after halt imports of coal from North Korea. In response, the Korean Central News Agency (KCNA) published an editorial titled "Neighboring Country's Mean Behavior" by Jong Phil, which said, "this country [China], styling itself a big power, is dancing to the tune of the US while defending its mean behaviour with such excuses that it was meant not to have a negative impact on the living of the people in the DPRK but to check its nuclear program".

In May 2017, KCNA published an article by Kim Chol titled "Commentary on DPRK-China relations", which made an unprecedented criticism of China, saying "a string of absurd and reckless remarks are now heard from China every day only to render the present bad situation tenser" and that "China had better ponder over the grave consequences to be entailed by its reckless act of chopping down the pillar of the DPRK-China relations". Accusing China of "big-power chauvinism", KCNA said Chinese support for sanctions against North Korea were "an undisguised threat to an honest-minded neighboring country which has a long history and tradition of friendship" and that "The DPRK will never beg for the maintenance of friendship with China". In September 2017, KCNA slammed negative editorials by the People's Daily and Global Times, saying "some media of China are seriously hurting the line and social system of the DPRK and threatening the DPRK" and calling them "the dirty excrement of the reactionaries of history" who "spouted such extremely ill-boding words". In February 2018, the KCNA again criticized Chinese media. According to KCNA, China Central Television "seriously spoiled the atmosphere of the feast by publishing presumptuous comments of individual experts" and the Global Times was condemned for "the behavior of scattering ashes on other's happy day as they bring the denuclearization issue".

In March 2018, North Korean leader Kim Jong Un visited China, his first travel overseas. He met with Chinese leader Xi Jinping for the first time in Beijing. Xinhua News Agency reported that the North Korean leader's trip lasted four days. Kim and his wife Ri Sol-ju were met with honour guards and a lavish banquet hosted by Xi Jinping. Kim Jong Un met Xi Jinping for the second time in Dalian, Liaoning on May 7–8, 2018, where they discussed denuclearization, and peace on the Korean peninsula. Kim Jong Un met with Xi Jinping in Beijing on June 19–20, 2018. He also met with Xi Jinping in Beijing on January 7–10, 2019. Xi was likewise received in the same-fashion when he visited Pyongyang in June 2019 on two-day state visit, the first of such since Hu Jintao's 2006 visit. In a North Korean mass games that Xi attended, he was depicted inside a gold-framed circle surrounded by red — the same style previously used to depict Kim Jong Un's father, Kim Jong Il, and grandfather, Kim Il Sung. It is also the first time a visit by a Chinese leader to North Korea has been called a state visit by the Chinese and North Korean governments.

In July 2019, North Korea was one of the 50 countries which signed a letter defending Xinjiang re-education camps and praising "China's remarkable achievements in the field of human rights in Xinjiang." North Korea has also defended China's position in the 2019–20 Hong Kong protests, with North Korean Foreign Minister Ri Yong-ho saying that "North Korea fully supports the stand and measures of China to defend the sovereignty, security and territorial integrity of the country and safeguard the prosperity and stability of Hong Kong, and concerns about foreign forces interference in Hong Kong issue." During an official visit to North Korea in September 2019, foreign minister Wang Yi said that "China will always stand on the road as comrades and friends" of North Korea. In October 2019, the two countries celebrated the 70th anniversary of the establishment of relations, with KCNA saying that their "invincible friendship will be immortal on the road of accomplishing the cause of socialism".

==== 2020s ====
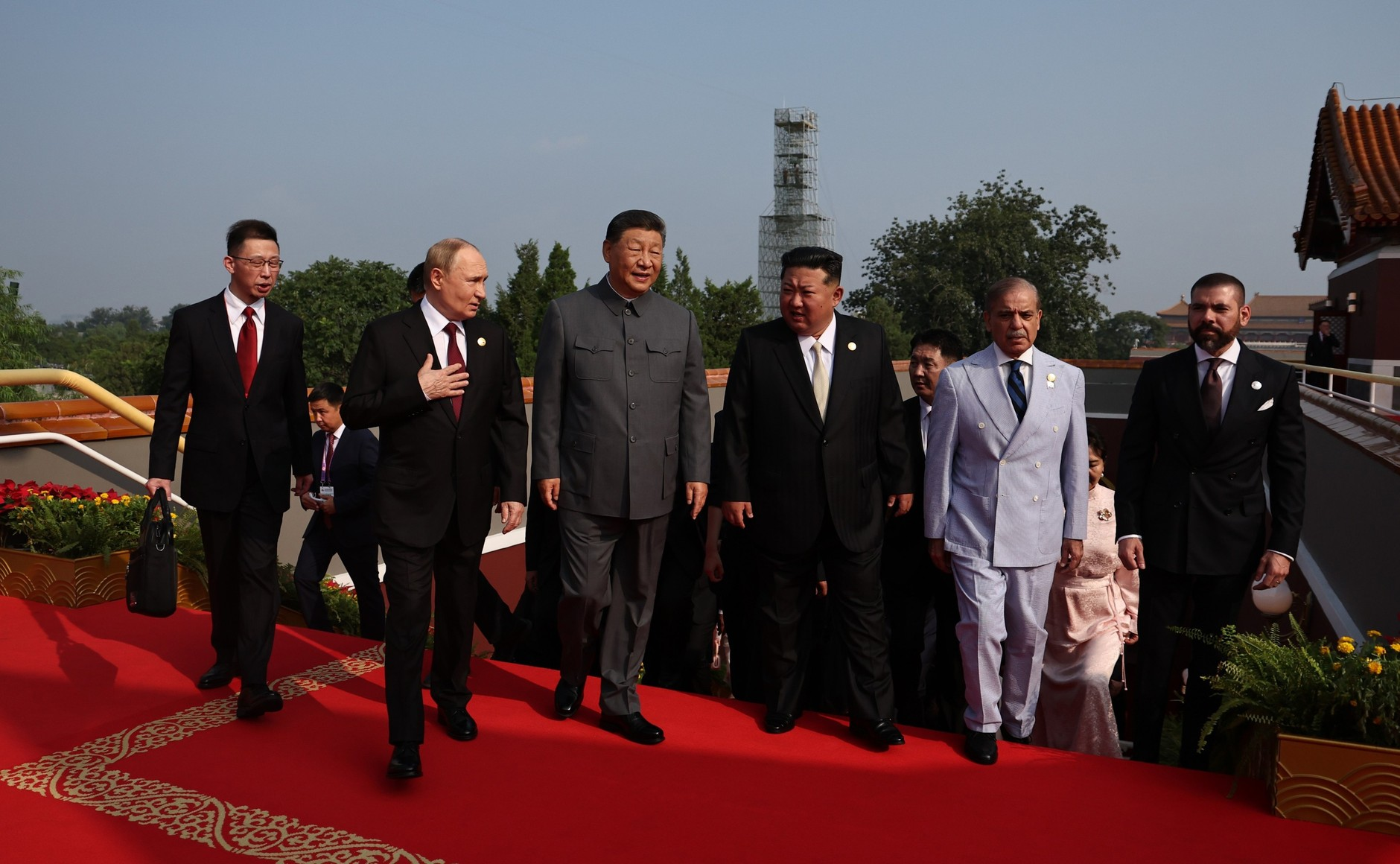
Chinese leader Xi Jinping and with North Korean leader Kim Jong Un together with Russian President Vladimir Putin and Pakistani Prime Minister Shehbaz Sharif during the 2025 China Victory Day Parade

In the 2020s, China started omitting mentioning "denuclearization of the Korean Peninsula" in its official statements regarding North Korea. In June 2020, North Korea was one of 53 countries that backed the Hong Kong national security law at the United Nations. On 29 January 2021, North Korea's Ministry of Foreign Affairs released a statement defending China's policies in Hong Kong and Xinjiang, accusing Western countries of creating a "human rights virus" that is "doomed to failure". On 1 July 2021, Kim Jong Un sent congratulatory greetings to Xi on the 100th Anniversary of the Chinese Communist Party, writing that the "100-year-long history of the CPC characterized by the changes and miracles unheard of in the history of thousands of years proved that the party's leadership and socialism with Chinese characteristics are the most correct option and guarantee for achieving the prosperity of the Chinese nation". He continued by saying "'Hostile forces' vicious slander and all-round pressure upon the CPC are no more than a last-ditch attempt, They can never check the ongoing advance of the Chinese people, rallied close around General Secretary Xi Jinping, toward a fresh victory".

After the 20th CCP National Congress in 2022, Rodong Sinmun, official newspaper of the ruling Workers' Party of Korea, wrote a long editorial praising Xi, titling both Kim and Xi Suryong (수령), a title historically reserved for North Korea's founder Kim Il Sung. In July 2023, CCP Politburo member and vice chairman of the Standing Committee of the National People's Congress Li Hongzhong visited North Korea to attend the 70th Day of Victory in the Great Fatherland Liberation War, the first trip by a high-ranking Chinese official since the beginning of the COVID-19 pandemic. During the visit, Li met with Kim Jong Un, where he gave a letter from Xi. Li also attended a North Korean military parade together with Kim and Russian defense minister Sergei Shoigu. On January 1, 2024, the two countries' top leaders designated 2024 as the "China-North Korea Friendship Year" to mark the 75th anniversary of the relationship, and launched a series of activities. In April 2024, NPCSC chair Zhao Leji visited North Korea, making him the highest-level Chinese official who has visited North Korea since CCP general secretary Xi Jinping visited North Korea in 2019. During the visit, Zhao holds a meeting with his North Korean counterpart Choe Ryong-hae and North Korean leader Kim Jong Un. However, ties were overshadowed by North Korea's new alliance with Russia, with the celebrations being muted. North Korean leader Kim Jong Un and Chinese leader Xi Jinping only exchanged letters, with no public celebrations.

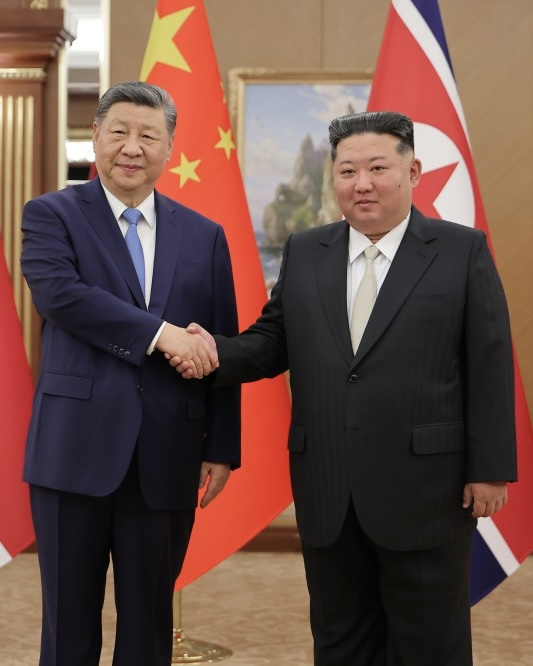
Meeting between General Secretary Kim Jong Un and General Secretary Xi Jinping

On September 2, 2025, North Korean leader Kim Jong Un, accompanied by many other North Korean dignitaries, traveled to Beijing by special train to attend the 80th anniversary of the China Victory Day Parade, marking his first visit to China since 2019, as well as the first time he attended a multilateral event. At about 8:18 am on September 3, Kim Jong Un arrived at Duanmen Gate on the north side of Tiananmen Square to attend the military parade. During the visit, he met with Chinese leader Xi Jinping. This was followed by a visit by Premier Li Qiang in October, who attended the 80th anniversary celebrations of the Workers' Party of Korea. In December 2025, China omitted mentioning "denuclearization of the Korean peninsula" in its white paper on China's arms control, instead stating that China calls on countries to "desist from an approach based on aggressive deterrence and coercion, restart dialogue and negotiations, and play a constructive role in resolving the Korean peninsula issue through political means and realizing lasting peace and stability in the peninsula".

In April 2026, Chinese foreign minister Wang Yi visited North Korea, holding talks with North Korean foreign minister Choe Son-hui and Kim Jong Un. Kim told Wang that North Korea "would fully support all the internal and external policies of the Chinese party and government for realizing the territorial integrity of the country on the basis of the "one-China" principle and building a fair and just multi-polar world". On 8 June 2026, Xi Jinping visited North Korea to meet Kim Jong Un, his first visit since 2019. The trip was seen as China's effort to regain influence as North Korea has grown closer to Russia, supplying troops and weapons in Ukraine in exchange for economic and military support. While China remains North Korea's main trading partner, Russia's assistance has reduced Pyongyang's reliance on Beijing. In July 2026, North Korean Premier Pak Thae-song visited China to mark the 65th anniversary of the Treaty of Friendship, Cooperation and Mutual Assistance; during his visit, he met with Xi Jinping and Li Qiang. In the same month, Chinese People's Political Consultative Conference National Committee chairman Wang Huning visited North Korea to mark the 65th anniversary of the treaty, where he met with WPK Organization and Guidance Department director Jo Yong-won and visited the Sino-Korean Friendship Tower, where he paid respects to Chinese volunteer soldiers who died in the Korean War. Wang also met with Kim Jong Un, and visited the Kumsusan Palace of the Sun, the People’s Volunteer Army Martyrs’ Cemetery and the Central Cadres Training School. On 15 October 2026, the New Yalu River Bridge officially opens to traffic which then connects the border between Dandong and Sinuiju. On 24 October, Kim Jong Un visited Dandong to commemorate the 76th anniversary of China's entry to the Korean War, where he met with CPPCC National Committee chairman Wang Huning and inspected the Memorial of the War to Resist US Aggression and Aid Korea, as well as the Huanghai Bus factory in Dandong, before returning to North Korea through the New Yalu River Bridge.

== Border ==
China and North Korea share a 1,416 km long land border that corresponds almost entirely to the course of the Yalu and Tumen rivers. The two countries signed a border treaty in 1962 to resolve their un-demarcated land border. China received 40% of the disputed crater lake on Mount Paektu (known as Changbai Mountain in China), while North Korea held the remaining land.

In the 1950s and 1960s, many ethnic Koreans in Northeast China crossed the border into North Korea to escape economic hardship and famine in China. In recent years, the flow of refugees has reversed, with a considerable number of North Koreans fleeing to China. Much of China's trade with North Korea goes through the port of Dandong on the Yalu River. Between March 1968 and March 1969, military skirmishes took place between the North Korean and Chinese forces. In February 1997, tourist access to the bridge over the Tumen at Wonjong-Quanhe was allowed.

In May 2012, China and North Korea signed an agreement on the construction and management of the cross-border bridge between Manpo in the Jagang Province of North Korea and Jian in China. In 2014, seven people were killed by North Korean border guards who had crossed the border in search of money, with locals reporting of North Korean soldiers of crossing the border to commit thefts and murders, especially during winter months when the Tumen River freezes over, allowing for easier access on foot. In 2015, a single rogue North Korean soldier killed four ethnic Korean citizens of China who lived along the border of China with North Korea. In April 2019, both countries opened the bridge connecting the cities of Ji'an, Jilin and Manpo after three years of construction.

=== Refugees ===
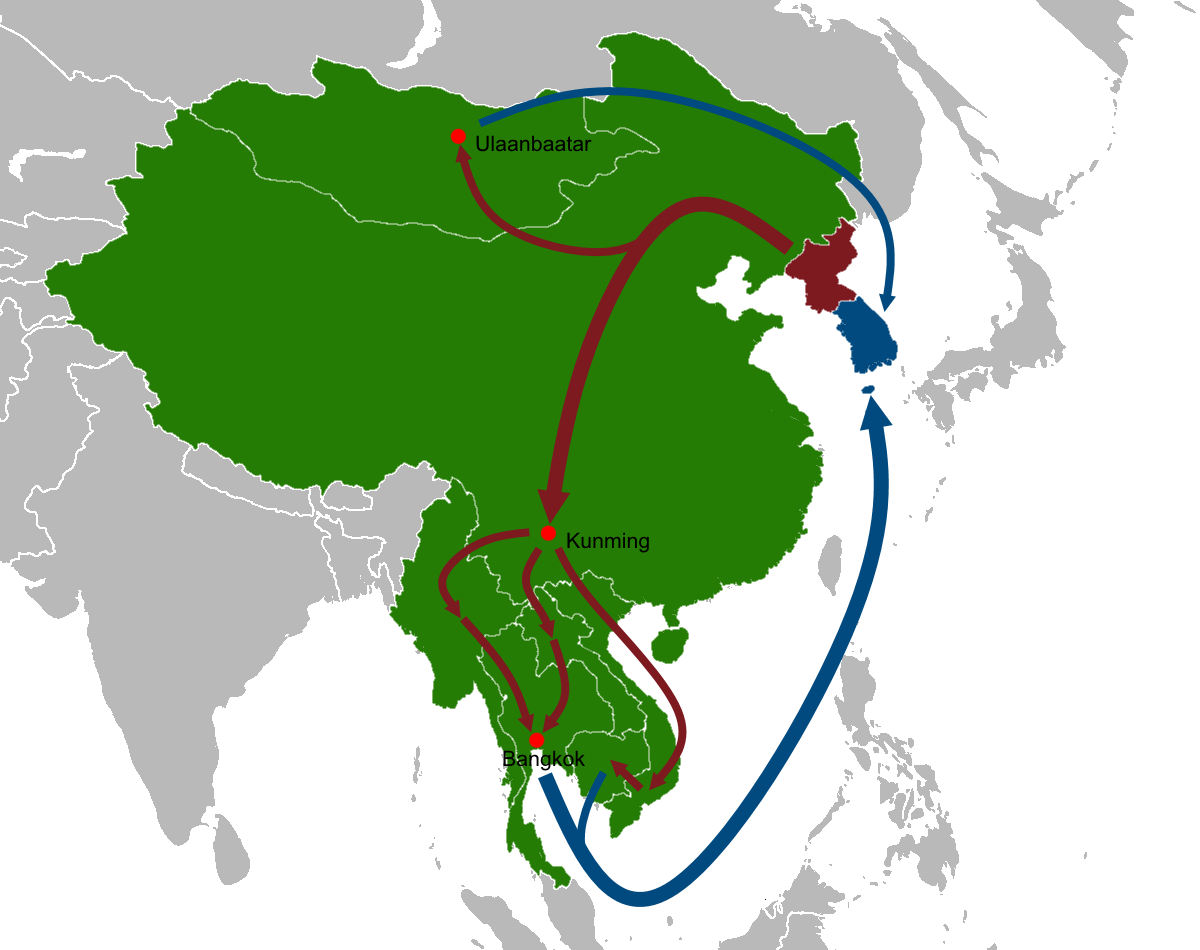
The routes North Koreans use to reach South Korea via China

Many North Korean defectors travel through their 1,416-km-long border with China rather than through the de facto Demilitarized Zone (DMZ) to reach South Korea. In 1982, China joined both the UN Convention Relating to the Status of Refugees and the Protocols Relating to the Status of Refugees. China's membership in these two organizations requires them to provide personal rights (economic and social rights presented in the CSR and PRSR) to any refugee entering their borders. However, China does not recognize North Korean defectors as refugees but rather classifies them as 'economic migrants' referring to their immigration due to food and financial struggles. Under the Refugee Conventions and Protocols, this would not classify North Korean defectors as refugees, but rather, border crossers, which has sparked debate. According to Korea scholar Andrei Lankov, the vast majority of refugees would first move to China to earn money, and later decide to continue on to South Korea. South Korean documentarian Cho Cheon-hyeon reported in February 2021 that there were more North Koreans in China who preferred to stay there or return to the North instead of going to South Korea.

In 1986 China and North Korea intensified their monitoring of illegal border crossers, or North Korean defectors through the Mutual Cooperation Protocols for the National Security and Maintenance of Social Order in the Border Regions. This required China to detain North Korean defectors and provide the North Korean government with information on who would defect. The issue is that repatriating defectors as illegal border crossers defies the Forced Repatriation Prohibition Principle (part of international law according to South Korean legal experts). The Chinese government most commonly forces defectors to return to North Korea if they are caught but in some instances has allowed them to pass through China into a third country.

Tensions regarding migrants crossing the Sino-North Korean border flared up in 2002 with a string of incidents of North Korean defectors reaching Japanese, American, Canadian, and South Korean consulates in the Chinese city of Shenyang and embassies in the capital of Beijing. Incidents in which Chinese state forces physically dragged defectors who were seeking asylum from the front steps of Japanese and South Korean consulates received international media attention and caused diplomatic rifts between involved countries. In one such case, a North Korean defector father and his 13-year-old son were separated as Chinese police pushed through a human wall of South Korean diplomats in an attempt to seize the migrants, ending in the father's capture and son's placement within the South Korean embassy in Beijing. In most cases of seizure, defectors are taken into custody by Chinese forces in order to be repatriated back to North Korea. Once in North Korea, many deserters are placed in relatively liberal but still notoriously deadly penal camps or executed.

== Economic relations ==
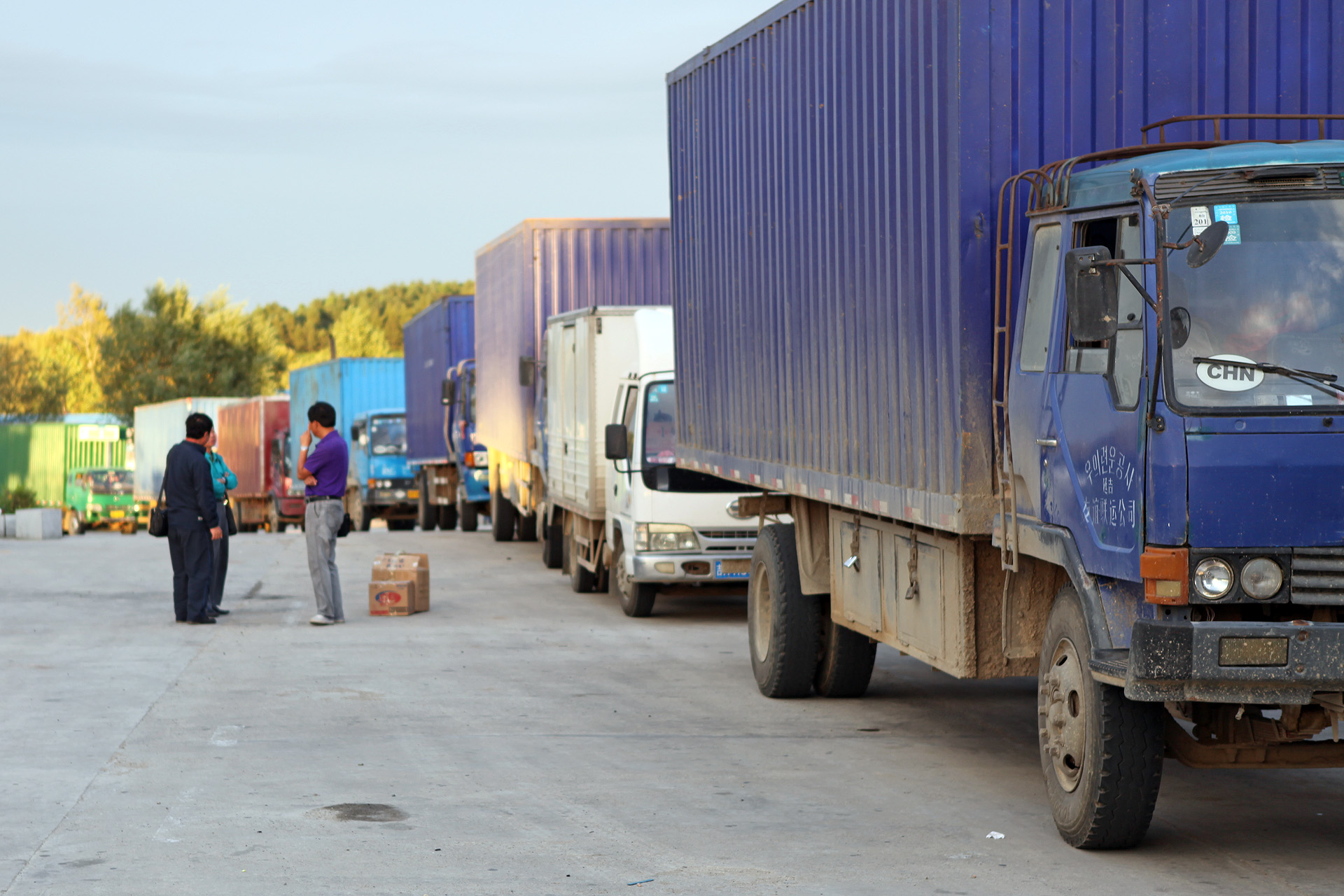
Trucks queued waiting for the border crossing between Quanhe and Wonjong to open.

China's economic assistance to North Korea accounts for about half of all Chinese foreign aid. Beijing provides the aid directly to Pyongyang, thereby enabling it to bypass the United Nations.

=== Trade ===
As the Soviet Union was dissolved, the North Korean trade system was in a quagmire without traditional cooperation partners. In this context, China has emerged as a major pillar of North Korea's economy. North Korea's dependence on the Chinese market has been further deepening, as the US and South Korea have postponed aid to North Korea and the overall slowdown of the north–south cooperation mechanisms. Since 2005, when enhanced Sino-North Korean economic and trade cooperation took place in the context of international power realignments with North Korea's share of trade with China exceeding that with the Soviet Union for the first time. It climbed over 80% in 2010 and has since remained in the 90%-plus range. While North Korea itself ranks relatively low as a source of imports to China. While North Korea imports a wide range of products from household items to strategic goods like oil and machinery, their exports to China are limited to anthracite, iron ore, and marine products due to their meagre industrial growth. North Korea is dependent on trade and aid from China, although international sanctions against North Korea have decreased overall official volume of trade. Between 2000 and 2015, trade between the two countries grew over ten-fold, reaching a peak of $6.86 billion in 2014. China is a major investor in North Korea's mining and metallurgical industries including steel and iron, copper, coal, and rare-earth minerals. China-North Korea trade also provides an important source of revenue to Jilin and Liaoning Provinces, which have suffered deindustrialization since the 1970s. In return, North Korea is dependent on China for imports of food and fuel, particularly since the end of South Korea's Sunshine Policy in 2008.

North Korean imports and exports with China, 2008–2020 (mil. USD)
Year	2008	2009	2010	2011	2012	2013	2014	2015	2016	2017	2018	2019	2020
Imports	2033.2	1887.7	2277.8	3165.2	3527.8	3632.9	4022.5	3226.5	3422.0	3608.0	2528.2	2883.6	712.8
Exports	754.0	793.0	1187.9	2464.2	2484.7	2913.6	2841.5	2483.9	2634.4	1650.7	194.6	215.2	48.0

Prior to 2016, not just the volume, but the trade pattern of Sino-North Korean trade kept optimized. China was the biggest source of production material (including food, electro-mechanical equipment, steel, chemical products, fossil fuel, and agricultural machine) as well as the most important market (coal, seafood, steel, clothing, etc.). Trade initially went a long way to making up for deficiencies in food and life's essentials in North Korea. The expansion of forms of cooperation, such as the Rason Economic and Trade Zone, led the Sino-North Korean trade to be more dependent on the service enterprises that create a significant portion of foreign exchange and intermediate and technical products for North Korea. Its development supporting function to North Korea's modernization has been growing in importance. However, since 2016, the UNSC has constantly adopted resolutions with more and more severe sanction measures. North Korea's principal exports, including coal, steel, gold, rare earths, seafood, and textiles, are fully banned and there are severe restrictions on imports of crude oil, steel, machinery, and cars. China has continued to insist on minimizing the negative effects of sanctions on the quality of life of the North Korean people but has opted to facilitate enforcement of sanctions resolutions to bring North Korea back to the negotiating table This strategy has brought direct consequences to the extent of the restructuring of Sino-North Korean trade.

In February 2017, China restricted all coal imports from North Korea until 2018. In 2016, coal briquettes had been the single largest good exported by North Korea, accounting for 46% of its trade with China. China has said this was in line with the UN sanctions against North Korea, but it is speculated that this occurred because of a mix of events, including recent nuclear tests, the suspected assassination of Kim Jong-nam, brother of ruler Kim Jong Un, and pressure on China from the rest of the world and especially the United States. However, despite this, North Korea has been reported to evade sanctions and continue to sell coal to China through a loophole. On 28 September 2017, in response to new UN Security Council sanctions over a nuclear test earlier in the month, China ordered all North Korean companies operating in China to cease operations within 120 days. By January 2018 customs statistics showed that trade between the two countries had fallen to a historic low, although volume again increased by 15.4% to $1.25 billion in the first half of 2019. China closed its border in late January 2020 due to the COVID-19 pandemic, and trade between the two countries nearly halted, with North Korean imports from and exports to China both down by over 90% year-over-year in March.

In 2020, trade fell by more than 80% due to COVID-19 pandemic. Chinese-North Korean trade was severely affected by the pandemic in 2020 onwards. Chinese-North Korean trade equaled US$318 million in 2021, compared to the US$539 million in 2020 and US$2.78 billion in 2019. Scholars have hinted that the prolonged COVID-19 restrictions from both North Korea and China have aided in the rapid decrease of trade revenue. Furthermore, there has been a lack of raw materials in North Korea, leading to less work, and thus less workers. This lack of raw materials can be attributed to China's lockdowns and restrictions during COVID-19. North Korea, due to their Enterprise Law in 2013 and 2015 allowed companies more freedom to control their own production, leading to an influx in Chinese raw materials and boosting bilateral trade.

North Korea had been one of the first countries to close their borders to China in order to avoid the virus, yet China is working to repair its ties with North Korea regardless. South Korea's central bank, the Bank of Korea, approximates that North Korea's economy shrank by around 4.5 percent. China and North Korea maintained informal trade, with China violating UN sanctions on North Korea. These sanctions include the illicit ship to ship transfers of 1.6 million barrels of refined oil to North Korea although the UN imposed a limit of 5,000 barrels per year. In September 2021, reports indicated that the Chinese government continued to smuggle imports of North Korean coal due to energy shortage issues throughout China. China has attempted to decrease the severity of sanctions against North Korean goods to address trade issues by appealing to the United Nations Security Council in November of the same year. In 2022, exports from China to North Korea increased by 247.5% year-on-year to $894 million, while total trade increased 226% from a year earlier to $1.03 billion. By 2023, North Korea's trade with China recovered to $2.3 billion, with imports exceeding $2 billion and exports at $292 million. In 2024, two-way trade declined slightly to $2.2 billion. In 2025, trade between the two countries further recovered to $2.74 billion. In March 2026, China announced that passenger-train services between Beijing, Dandong and Pyongyang would resume on 12 March for the first time since 2020. Total of two-way trade of January to March 2026 reached 662,51 million USD compared to same timeframe in 2025 that was at 582,42 million USD.

=== Automotives ===
Following North Korea's liberalization of car ownership in 2024 and 2025, North Korean demand for Chinese automotives has surged. Imported Chinese cars have rebadged with North Korean manufacturer labels.

=== Sanctions ===
The United States has sanctioned many Chinese companies for violating North Korean sanctions, possibly aiding their nuclear program.

=== Banking ===
On 7 May 2013, Bank of China, China's biggest foreign exchange bank, joined other international banks in closing the accounts of North Korea's Foreign Trade Bank, its main foreign exchange bank. Although neither entity stated reasons for the closure, it is widely assumed that it was in response to sanctions placed against Bank of China by the United States for its alleged assistance in financing the North Korean nuclear weapons program.

=== Investments ===
In 2012, a $45 million investment by China's Haicheng Xiyang Group into an iron-ore powder processing plant failed under what the Chinese called "a nightmare". On 21 February 2016 China quietly ended financial support of North Korea without any media publicity. It is reported to be due to the fallout of relations between the two governments.

In July 2019, Washington Post reported that Huawei "secretly helped" North Korea to build and maintain its cellular network in conjunction with Chinese state-owned enterprise Panda International Information Technology Co.

=== Tourism ===
In February 2025, North Korea allowed a small group of international tourists to visit, marking the first such visit in five years. These tourists, including those from Europe, visited the Rason economic zone, signaling a potential shift in North Korea's tourism industry aimed at boosting foreign currency. While China remains North Korea's largest trading partner, ties have cooled as North Korea has grown closer to Russia, particularly after the war in Ukraine. Despite this, China's role in North Korea's tourism remains significant, as Chinese tourists represented over 90% of foreign visitors before the pandemic. North Korea hopes to revive tourism, with plans to open a major site on the east coast in June 2025.

== Military relations ==
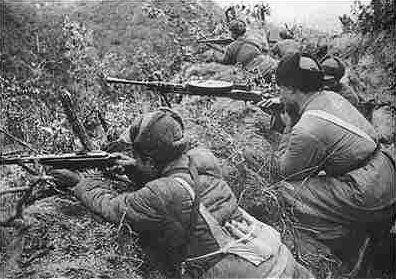
Chinese soldiers at the Battle of Triangle Hill in 1952, during the Korean War.

China assisted North Korea during the Korean War (1950–53) against South Korean and United Nations forces on the Korean peninsula. Although China itself remained neutral, three million Chinese soldiers participated in the conflict as part of the People's Volunteer Army fighting alongside the Korean People's Army. As many as 180,000 were killed.

Since the end of the Korean War, the two states have closely cooperated in security and defense issues. The two countries signed the mutual aid and co-operation treaty in 1961, which is currently the only defense treaty China has with any nation, and was the only defense treaty North Korea had with any country until the signing of the North Korean–Russian Treaty on Comprehensive Strategic Partnership in 2024. In 1975, Kim Il Sung visited Beijing in a failed attempt to solicit support from China for a military invasion of South Korea. On 23 November 2009, Chinese Defense Minister Liang Guanglie visited Pyongyang, the first defense chief to visit since 2006. In August 2019, director of the General Political Bureau of the KPA Kim Su Gil visited Beijing to meet with Zhang Youxia. Zhang told Kim that the delegation's visit as was of "crucial significance in bilateral exchange".

== Diplomatic missions ==
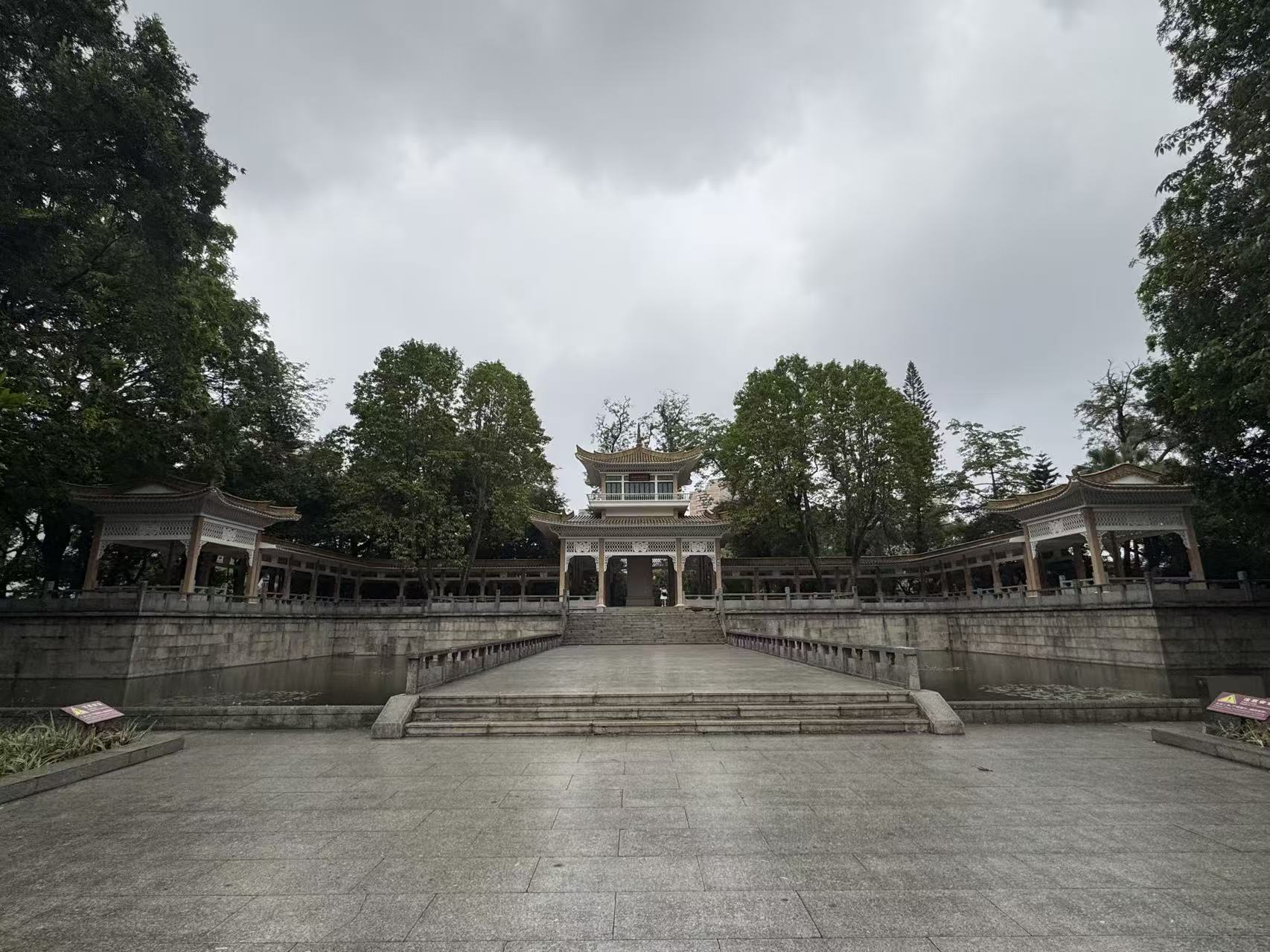
Sino-Korean Friendship Pavilion, in Guangzhou, at the Guangzhou Uprising Martyrs Cemetery

China maintains an embassy in the North Korean capital of Pyongyang and a consulate general in Chongjin. The embassy of North Korea in China is located in Beijing's Chaoyang District, while a consulate general is in Shenyang.

== Poll ==
According to a 2014 BBC World Service Poll, 20% of Chinese people view North Korea's influence positively, with 46% expressing a negative view. According to a 2025 poll by the Chicago Council on Global Affairs and the Carter Center, 76% of Chinese people consider North Korea to be a friend of China, while 23% do not. According to a 2026 poll by the Carter Center and Emory University, 56% of Chinese people agree that China should continue providing economic support to North Korea, even if the United Nations Security Council imposes sanctions on North Korea, while 18% disagree. 42% agree with providing military support to North Korea despite the sanctions, while 28% disagree.

== See also ==
- Korea Bay
- Sino-Korean Friendship Bridge
