= 2019 state visit by Xi Jinping to North Korea =

- Part of China–North Korea relations
- Date: 20–21 June 2019
- Location: Pyongyang, North Korea
- Participants: Xi Jinping; Kim Jong Un

On 20–21 June 2019, Xi Jinping, general secretary of the Chinese Communist Party (CCP) and Chinese president, visited North Korea. During the visit, he met with North Korean leader Kim Jong Un.

It was the first official visit by a Chinese leader to the country since Hu Jintao's visit 14 years prior and the first one for Xi personally since his visit to North Korea as Vice President and CCP Politburo Standing Committee member in 2008. It is also the first time a visit by a Chinese leader to North Korea has been called a "state visit" by the Chinese and North Korean governments.

== Visit ==
Xi Jinping was met at Pyongyang International Airport by Chairman Kim Jong Un where he received full military honours including a 21-gun salute and a march-past by the Supreme Guard Command Honor Guard Battalion and the Central Military Band of the Korean People's Army. Xi visited the Kumsusan Palace of the Sun, becoming the first Chinese leader to do so. The following evening, Xi and Kim witnessed a performance of the Korean People's Army State Merited Chorus and Symphony Orchestra at the reopening of the 2019 Arirang Mass Games at Rungrado 1st of May Stadium. In the North Korean mass games, Xi was depicted inside a gold-framed circle surrounded by red — the same style previously used to depict Kim Jong Un's father, Kim Jong Il, and grandfather, Kim Il Sung.

== See also ==
- Kim–Xi meetings
- 2026 state visit by Xi Jinping to North Korea
