= Kumsusan State Guest House =

Building in Pyongyang, North Korea

The Kumsusan State Guest House is a building in Pyongyang, North Korea. It is used by the North Korean government to host foreign leaders.

== History ==
The Kumsusan State Guest House was completed in 2019. It was first used to host Chinese leader Xi Jinping during his state visit to North Korea. It has also been used in other diplomatic occasions, such as during Russian president Vladimir Putin's visit to North Korea in 2024, Belarussian president Alexander Lukashenko's visit in 2026, Chinese foreign minister Wang Yi's visit in 2026, and Chinese leader Xi's second state visit in 2026.
