= A State of Mind (film) =

2005 British documentary film

- DVD cover
- Directed by: Daniel Gordon
- Written by: Daniel Gordon
- Produced by: Nicholas Bonner; John Battsek; Daniel Gordon
- Cinematography: Nick Bennett
- Edited by: Peter Haddon
- Music by: Barnaby Taylor
- Production companies: VeryMuchSo Productions; Passion Pictures; BBC
- Distributed by: Kino International
- Release date: 10 August 2005 (New York City)
- Running time: 93 minutes
- Country: United Kingdom
- Languages: English; Korean
- Box office: $81,450

A State of Mind is a 2004 documentary film directed by Daniel Gordon, who is known for his documentaries on sports and North Korea. It follows two North Korean child gymnasts and their families for over eight months during training for the 2003 Pyongyang mass games. The film won two awards at the North Korean Pyongyang International Film Festival in 2004 and was shown at 11 other film festivals worldwide before being released in a theatrical run in 2005.

== Production ==
Daniel Gordon received US$600,000 from the BBC and WNET to produce the film. He and his team initially intended to have the documentary feature on one gymnast and one backdrop creator. They requested to meet with the mass games' best gymnast, and in September 2002 they met Pak Hyon Sun and her family. After speaking with Pak, they met with her friend, fellow gymnast Kim Song Yon. Authorities then suggested the filmmakers focus on Kim, which Gordon pushed back on. By April 2003, they decided to focus filming on both girls.

Gordon and his team were accompanied by guides and translators during the production of the film. According to Gordon, they "neither interfered nor sought to censor the material".

The film did not have any input from North Korean authorities during the editing process, and their footage was not screened prior to leaving the country.

== Release and reception ==
The documentary was aired on the BBC in June 2004, and premiering at the Tribeca Film Festival in New York City that same month. It premiered in American theaters on August 10, 2004, and in Seoul later that month. The film received positive reviews among Western outlets, including The New York Times, Slant Magazine, Variety, and The Washington Post. The documentary has been broadcast multiple times on North Korean state television.

Parts from this documentary were used for one of the music videos for I Want More by Faithless.
