= Treaty on Friendship, Cooperation and Mutual Assistance between China and North Korea =

1961 treaty between China and North Korea

Treaty on Friendship, Cooperation and Mutual Assistance between the People's Republic of China and the Democratic People's Republic of Korea
中华人民共和国和朝鲜民主主义人民共和国友好合作互助条约 조선민주주의인민공화국과 중화인민공화국간의 우호, 협조 및 호상원조에 관한 조약
- Type: Treaty of friendship Defense pact
- Signed: 11 July 1961
- Location: Beijing, China
- Signatories: Premier Zhou Enlai; Premier Kim Il Sung
- Parties: China; North Korea
- Languages: Chinese; Korean

Full text
- zh:中朝友好合作互助条约 at Wikisource

Treaty on Friendship, Cooperation and Mutual Assistance between China and North Korea

Chinese name
- Simplified Chinese: 中朝友好合作互助条约
- Traditional Chinese: 中朝友好合作互助條約
Transcriptions
Standard Mandarin
- Hanyu Pinyin: Zhōngcháo Yǒuhǎo Hézuò Hùzhù Tiáoyuē
Yue: Cantonese
- Jyutping: zung1 ciu4 jau5 hou2 hap6 zok3 wu6 zo6 tiu4 joek3

Korean name
- Hangul: 조중우호, 협조 및 호상원조에 관한 조약
Transcriptions
- Revised Romanization: Jojunguho, hyeopjo min hosangwonjoe gwanhan joyak
- McCune–Reischauer: Chojunguho, hyŏpcho min hosangwŏnjoe kwanhan choyak

The Treaty on Friendship, Cooperation and Mutual Assistance between the People's Republic of China and the Democratic People's Republic of Korea is a defense pact between the People's Republic of China and the Democratic People's Republic of Korea. It was signed on 11 July 1961 in Beijing by Chinese premier Zhou Enlai and North Korean leader Kim Il Sung.

The treaty is currently the only defense pact China has with any nation, while North Korea signed a similar treaty with Russia in June 2024.

== History ==
Following World War II, the Korean Peninsula was divided into South Korea, supported by the United States, and North Korea, supported by the Soviet Union and China. Neither side recognized the legitimacy of the other's regime. After the 1961 May 16 coup, the new South Korean leader Park Chung Hee urged for an increase in military spending and for action to be taken against North Korea. The North Korean leadership feared a South Korean invasion and turned to the Soviet Union and China for support.

Kim Il Sung arrived in Beijing in 1961 to sign the treaty just a few days after signing the North Korean-Soviet Mutual Aid and Cooperation Friendship Treaty (조소 우호협조 및 상호원조 조약). However, the Soviet treaty has not entered into force since the 1990s, and only a revised "consultation" treaty was re-ratified in 1999. The treaty was signed by North Korean Premier Kim Il Sung and Chinese Premier Zhou Enlai on 11 July 1961 in Beijing, It was approved by Liu Shaoqi, then Chairman of China, on 30 August. The Standing Committee of the Supreme People's Assembly of North Korea approved it on 23 August. On 10 September, Zhou Enlai and Kim Il-sung, as representatives of both sides, exchanged instruments of ratification in Pyongyang, the capital of North Korea, after which the treaty came into effect.

== Provisions of the treaty ==
The treaty generally promoted peaceful cooperation in the areas of culture, economics, technology and other social benefits between the two nations. Article 1 of the treaty states that both countries will work to "safeguard the peace of Asia and the world and the security of all peoples". Specifically, Article 2 of the treaty declares "In the event of one of the Contracting Parties being subjected to the armed attack by any state or several states jointly and thus being involved in a state of war, the other Contracting Party shall immediately render military and other assistance by all means at its disposal". According to Article 3, both parties also guarantee that they will not participate in any alliance, group, action or measure hostile to the other.

In accordance with Article 7, the Treaty remains in force unless an agreement is reached on its amendment or termination.

== Status ==
After the dissolution of the Soviet Union in 1991, the Soviet-North Korean Treaty of Friendship, Cooperation and Mutual Assistance became invalid, and this treaty became the only mutual defense treaty signed by China or North Korea. There are rumors that China has consistently rejected North Korea's proposal to amend the “automatic intervention clause”, and a similar clause does not appear in the United States–South Korea Mutual Defense Treaty.

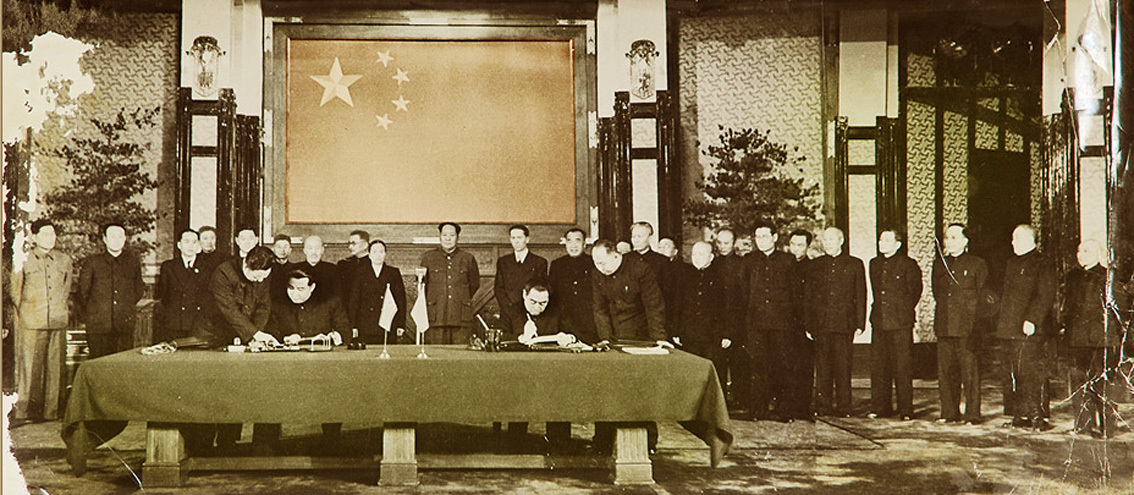
Signing of the treaty by Kim Il Sung and Zhou Enlai on 11 July 1961, Beijing

On 11 July 2021, the Korean Central Television reported that North Korean leader Kim Jong Un sent a congratulatory telegram to Chinese leader Xi Jinping on the same day to celebrate the 60th anniversary of the signing of the treaty. He said that the friendship between North Korea and China is deepening and expressed the need to strengthen cooperation in various fields such as politics, economy, military and culture to deal with the challenges of "hostile forces". The Chinese Ministry of Foreign Affairs confirmed the report at a regular press conference on 12 July 2021, in response to a reporter's question, and stated that the treaty was still in effect.

In July 2026, North Korean Premier Pak Thae-song visited China to mark the 65th anniversary of the treaty. During his visit, he met with Xi Jinping and Premier Li Qiang. In the same month, Chinese People's Political Consultative Conference National Committee chairman Wang Huning visited North Korea to mark the 65th anniversary of the treaty, where he met with WPK Organization and Guidance Department director Jo Yong-won and visited the Sino-Korean Friendship Tower, where he paid respects to Chinese volunteer soldiers who died in the Korean War. Wang also met with Kim Jong Un, and visited the Kumsusan Palace of the Sun, the People’s Volunteer Army Martyrs’ Cemetery and the Central Cadres Training School.

The treaty is currently the only defense treaty China has with any nation, while North Korea signed another similar treaty with Russia in June 2024.

== See also ==
- Sino-Soviet relations from 1969 to 1991
- Sino-Soviet Treaty of Friendship, Alliance and Mutual Assistance
- Sino-Korean Border Agreement
