= Pyongyang Gymnasium =

Sporting area in North Korea

평양체육관 Pyongyang Gymnasium
- Pyongyang Indoor Stadium
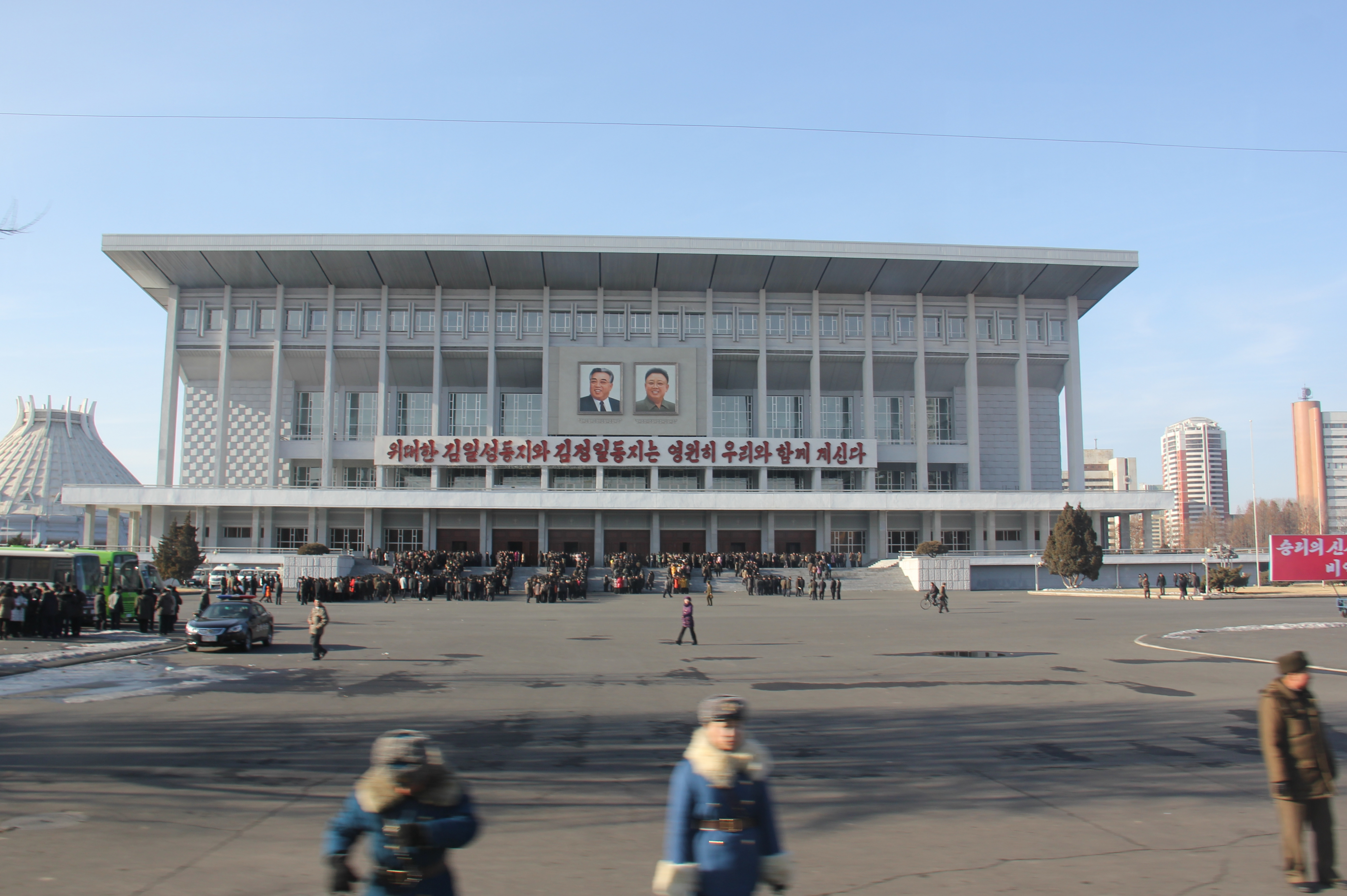
- Exterior of the Pyongyang Gymnasium

- Location in Pyongyang
- Interactive map of 평양체육관; Pyongyang Gymnasium
- Full name: Pyongyang Indoor Stadium
- Location: Pyongyang, North Korea
- Coordinates: 39°01′22″N 125°44′04″E
- Capacity: 20,100 (sports and concerts)
- Surface: Parquet

Construction
- Opened: April 1973
- Renovated: 2013
- Architect: Yun Ko-gwang

Pyongyang Gymnasium, also known as Pyongyang Indoor Stadium, is an indoor sporting arena located in Pyongyang, North Korea. The capacity of the arena is for 20,100 people and it was opened in 1973.

It is used to host indoor sporting events, such as basketball and volleyball, as well as concerts. Notable events held in the venue include a basketball match between the North Korea men's national basketball team and American former National Basketball Association players in 2014, and the 2003 mass games that featured in the 2004 documentary film A State of Mind.

The gymnasium also hosted important state-level conferences and congresses, such as the 15th National Conference of Teachers in September 2026 and anniversary celebration of the Party Foundation Day.

Gallery
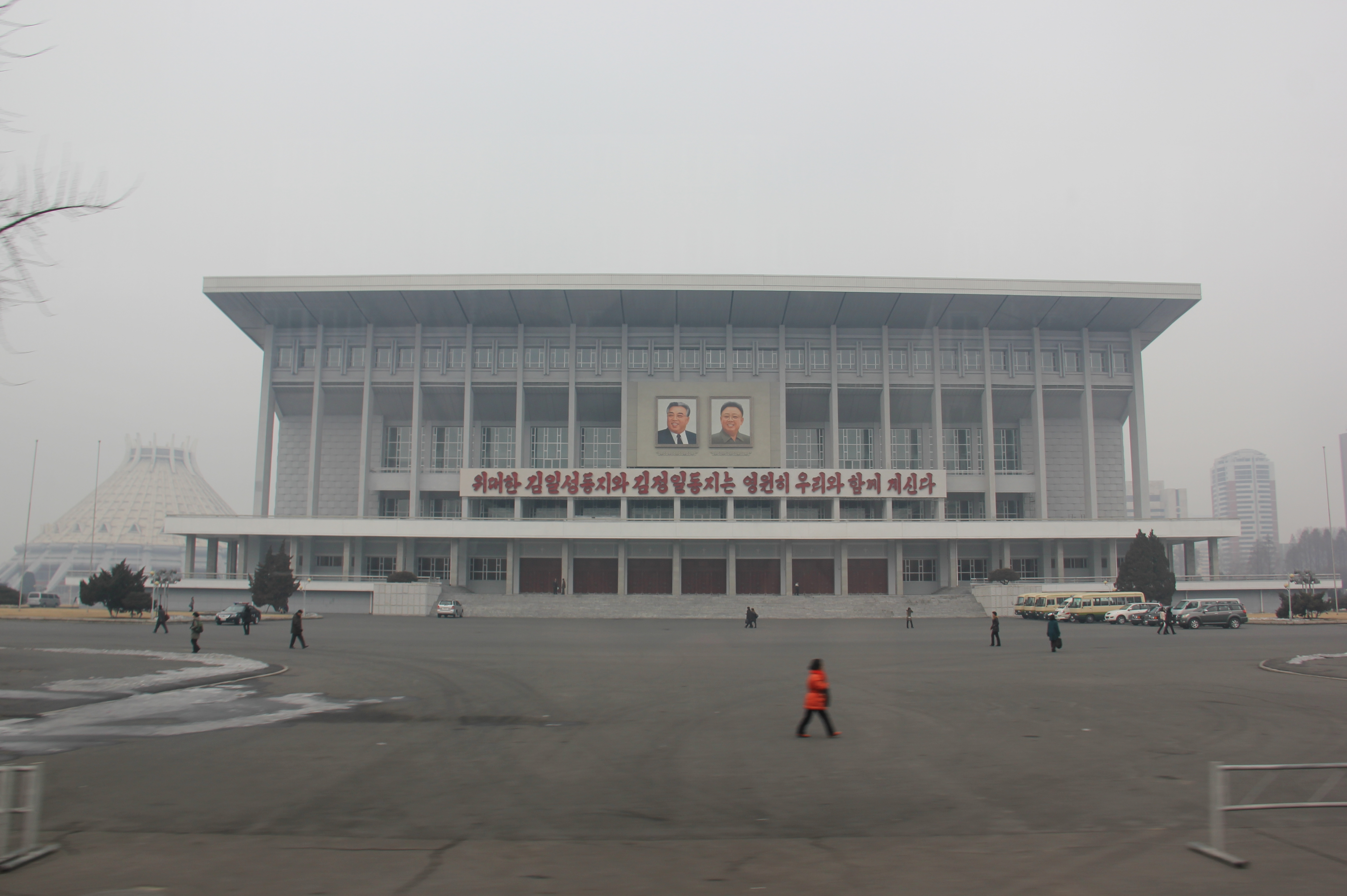

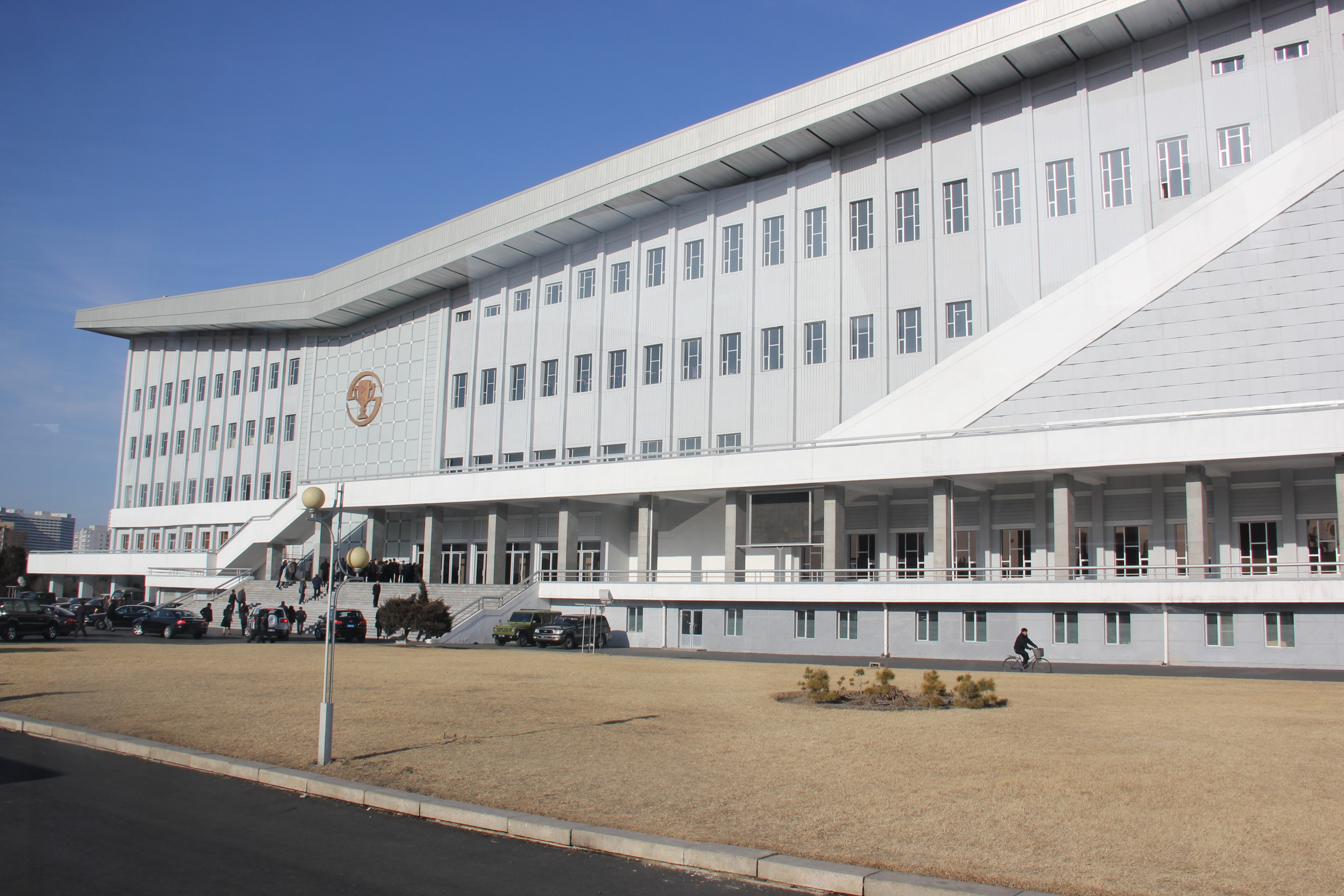

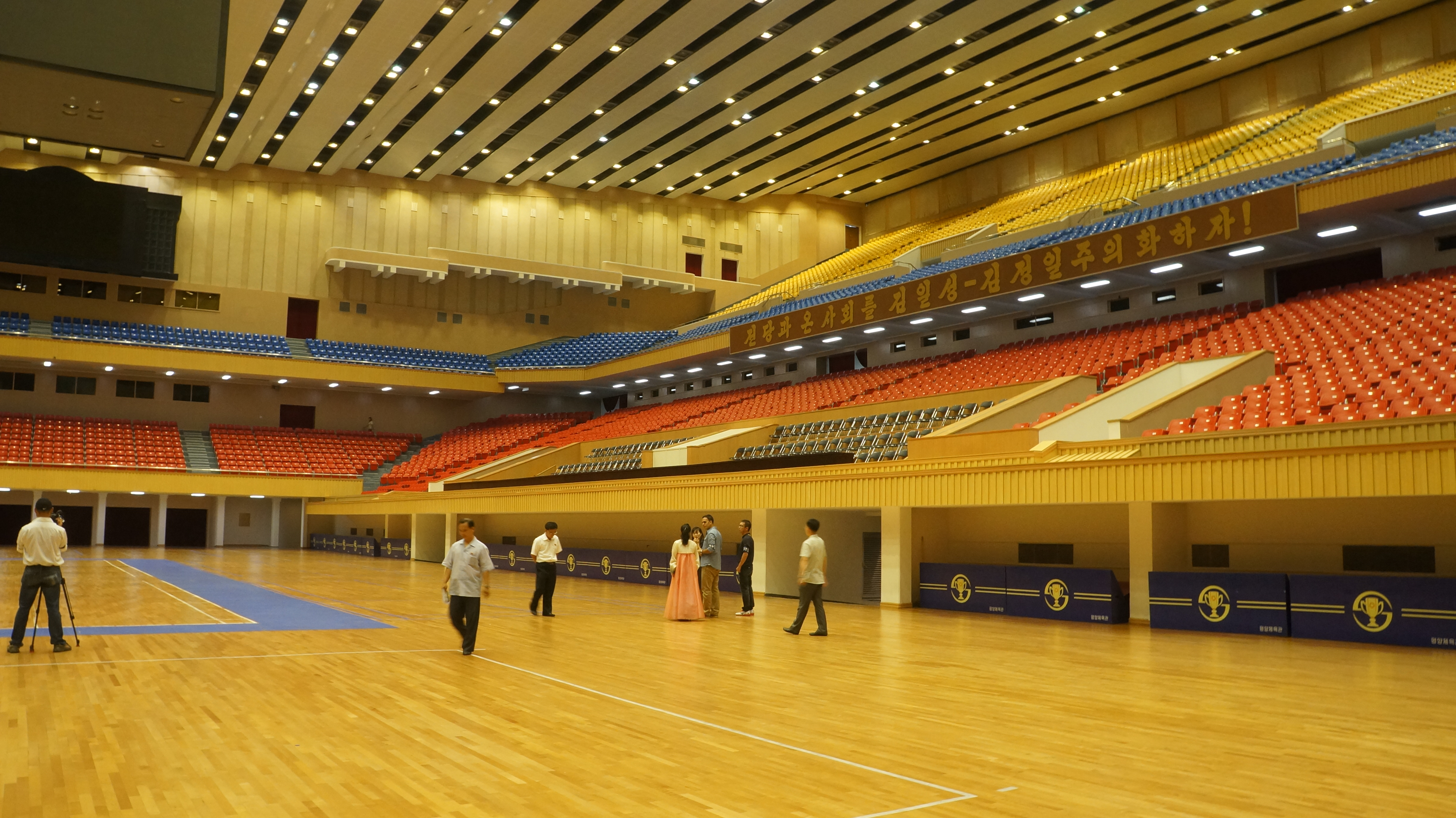

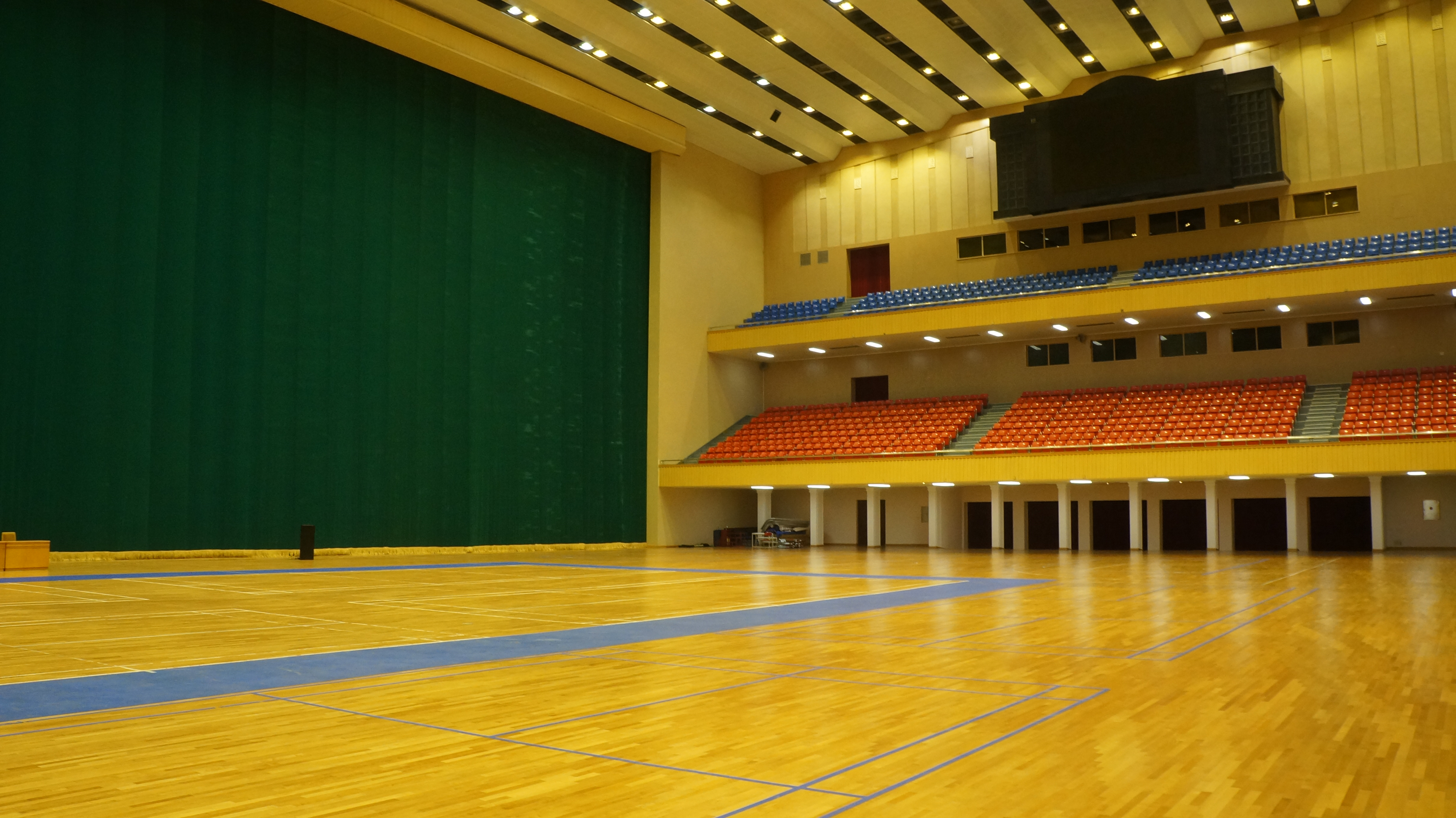
