= Mass games =

Form of performing arts or gymnastics

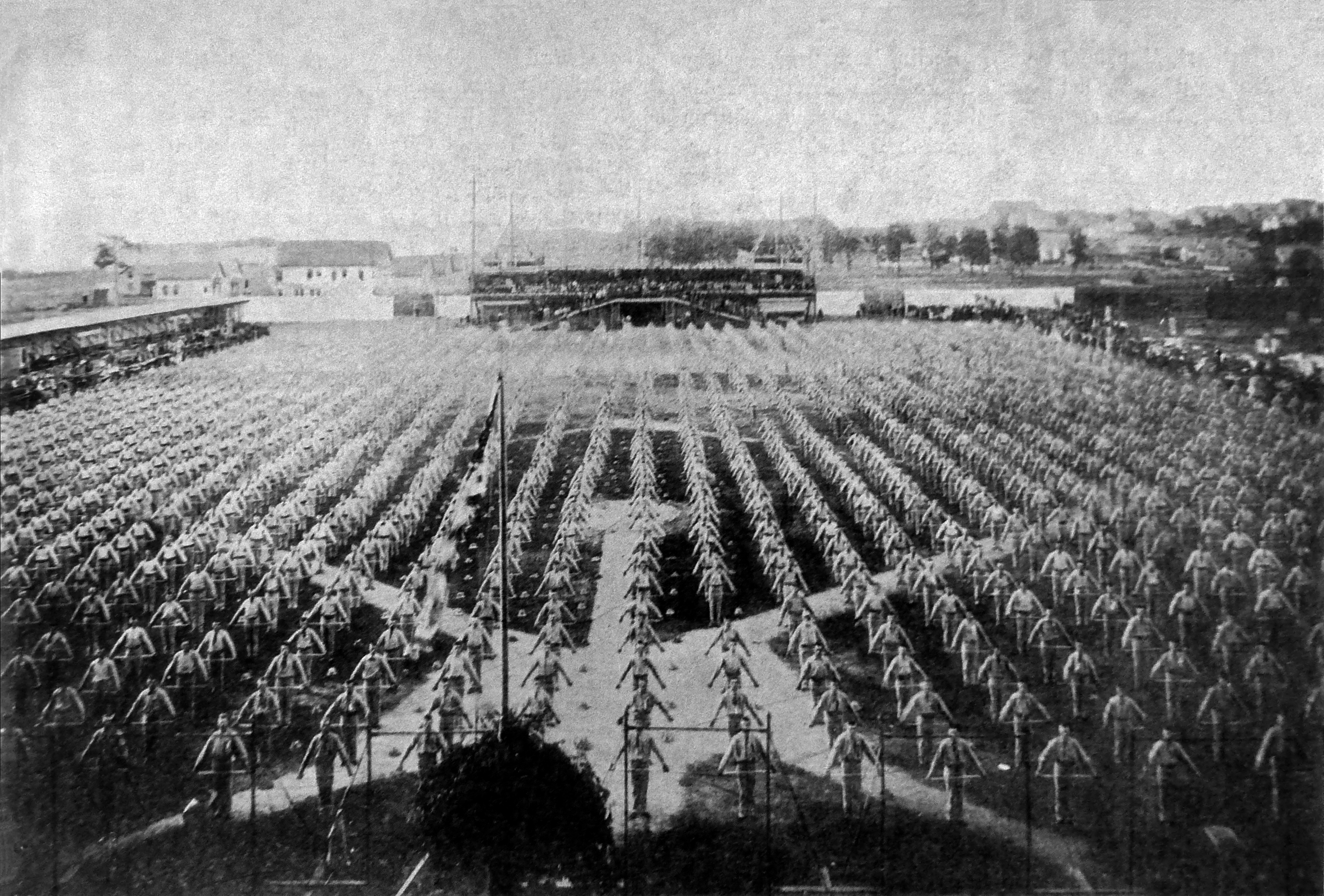
Federal Gymnastics Festival in Milwaukee, 1893

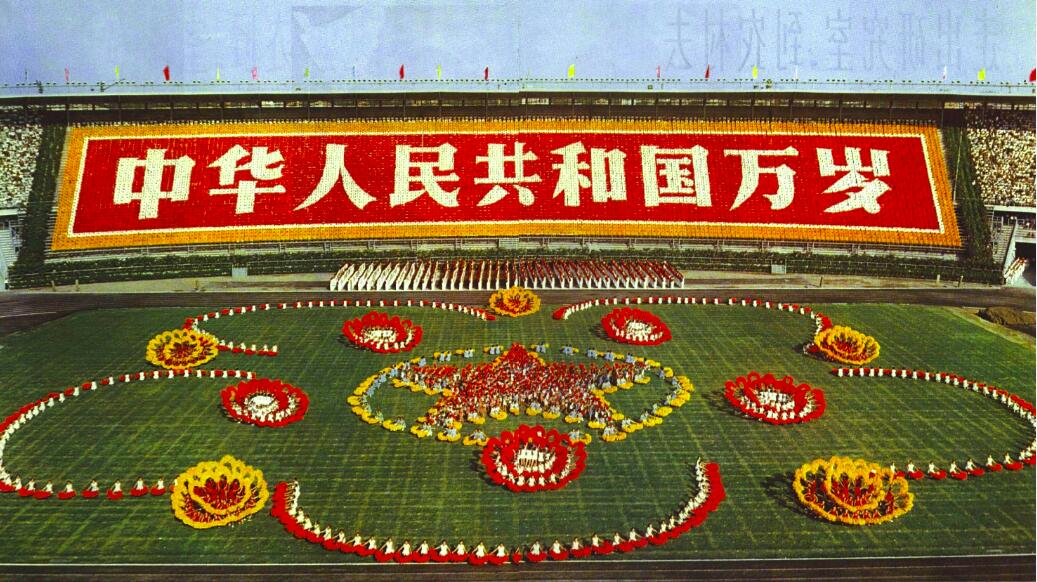
Opening ceremony of the Second National Games of China at the Workers' Stadium in Beijing, September 1965

Mass games, or mass gymnastics, are a form of performing arts or gymnastics in which large numbers of performers take part in a highly regimented performance that emphasizes group dynamics rather than individual prowess.

== North Korea ==
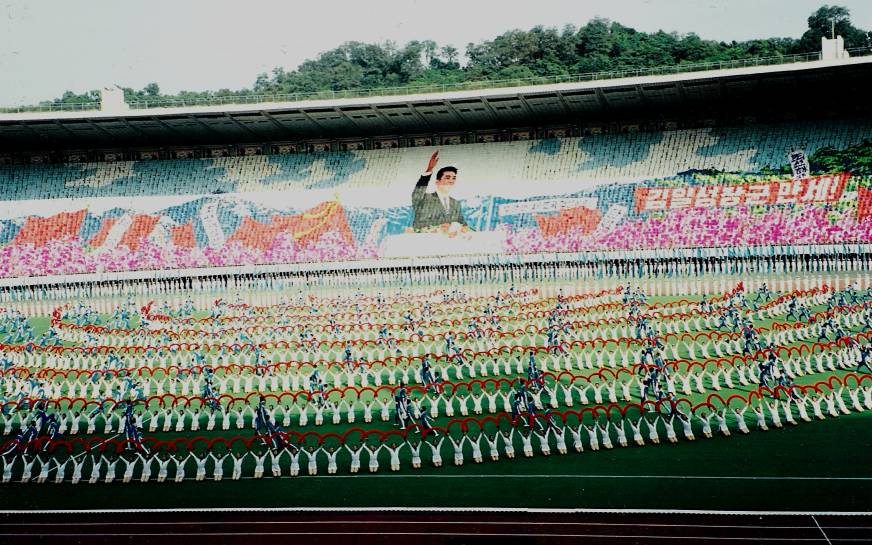
1998 mass games held at Kim Il-sung Stadium, Pyongyang, North Korea. The performers are honoring the image of former Supreme Leader Kim Il-sung.

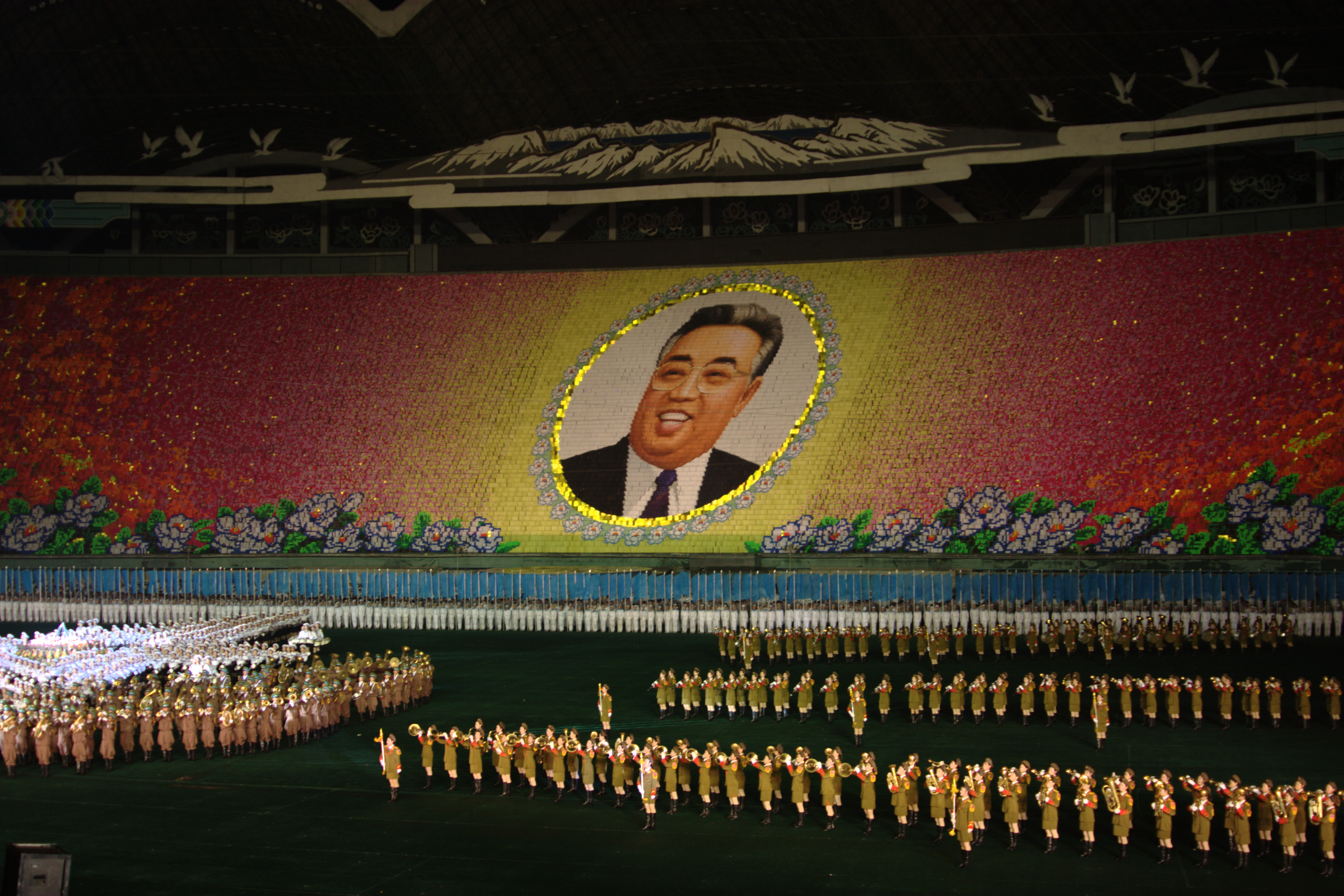
Mass games festival in North Korea. The performers are honoring the image of the Eternal President, Kim Il-sung.

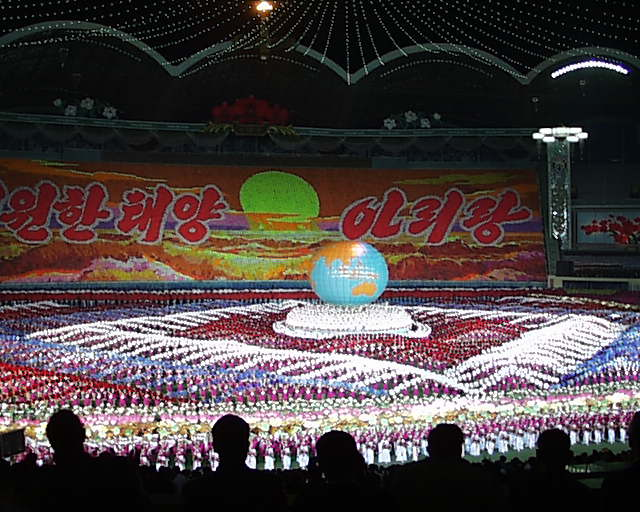
Arirang Festival mass games display in Pyongyang

Mass games, such as the Arirang Mass Games, are performed annually in North Korea, at the Rungrado May Day Stadium, to celebrate national holidays such as the birthdays of former rulers Kim Il-sung and Kim Jong-il. In the 1990s, they were also held at the Kim Il-sung Stadium and the Pyongyang Gymnasium. North Korean mass games typically feature over 100,000 participants in a 90-minute display of gymnastics, dance, acrobatics, and dramatic performance, accompanied by music and other effects, all wrapped in a highly politicized package.

Per Kim Jong-il:

Developing mass gymnastics is important in training schoolchildren to be fully developed communist people. To be a fully developed communist man, one must acquire a revolutionary ideology, the knowledge of many fields, rich cultural attainments and a healthy and strong physique. These are the basic qualities required of a man of the communist type. Mass gymnastics play an important role in training schoolchildren to acquire these communist qualities. Mass gymnastics foster particularly healthy and strong physiques, a high degree of organization, discipline and collectivism in schoolchildren. The schoolchildren, conscious that a single slip in their action may spoil their mass gymnastic performance, make every effort to subordinate all their thoughts and actions to the collective.

— Kim Jong-il, On Further Developing Mass Gymnastics: Talk to mass Gymnastics Producers. April 11th 1987

Mass gymnastics exhibit the North Korean idea of ilsim-dangyeol (single-minded unity) as well as nationalism.

The 2004 British documentary film A State of Mind follows two child gymnasts training for the mass games in Pyongyang.

== Outside North Korea ==
=== Guyana ===
Guyana, under Forbes Burnham (1964–1985), held mass games in February 1980, to celebrate the nation's ten-year anniversary.

=== Europe ===
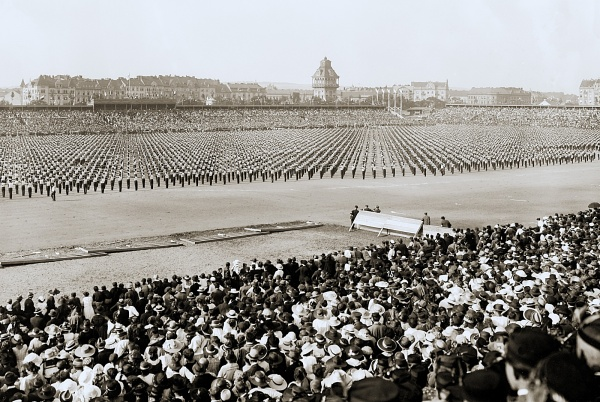
Czech Sokol Slet, Prague, 1920

Germany

In Germany, Friedrich Ludwig Jahn developed a gymnastics method called Massenturnen. In 1860, in a bid to promote the sport, he initiated the Massenturnen festival. The festival continues to be held to this day, in the form of an international gymnastics event.

In East Germany, eight mass games, called the GDR Gymnastics and Sports Festival, were held in Leipzig. Participation was voluntary, and the segments combined both Western and Eastern elements, infused with German traditions.

Czechoslovakia/Czechia

Mass games developed in Czechoslovakia as part of the Sokol movement, a gymnastics organization that organizes the Slet event. The word slet means "festival", or "gathering of birds". The first Slet was held in 1882 in Prague to celebrate the 20th anniversary of the organization's founding. Since 1994, Slets have been held every six years, with the most recent one having taken place in June 2024.

Czechoslovakia also organized the Spartakiad, a mass gymnastics event meant to celebrate the country's liberation by the Soviet Red Army in 1945. The event was held regularly between 1955 and 1990.

Yugoslavia

In Yugoslavia, similar activities, also called Slet, were organized, and one of these was the Relay of Youth; participation in the events was voluntary.

Romania

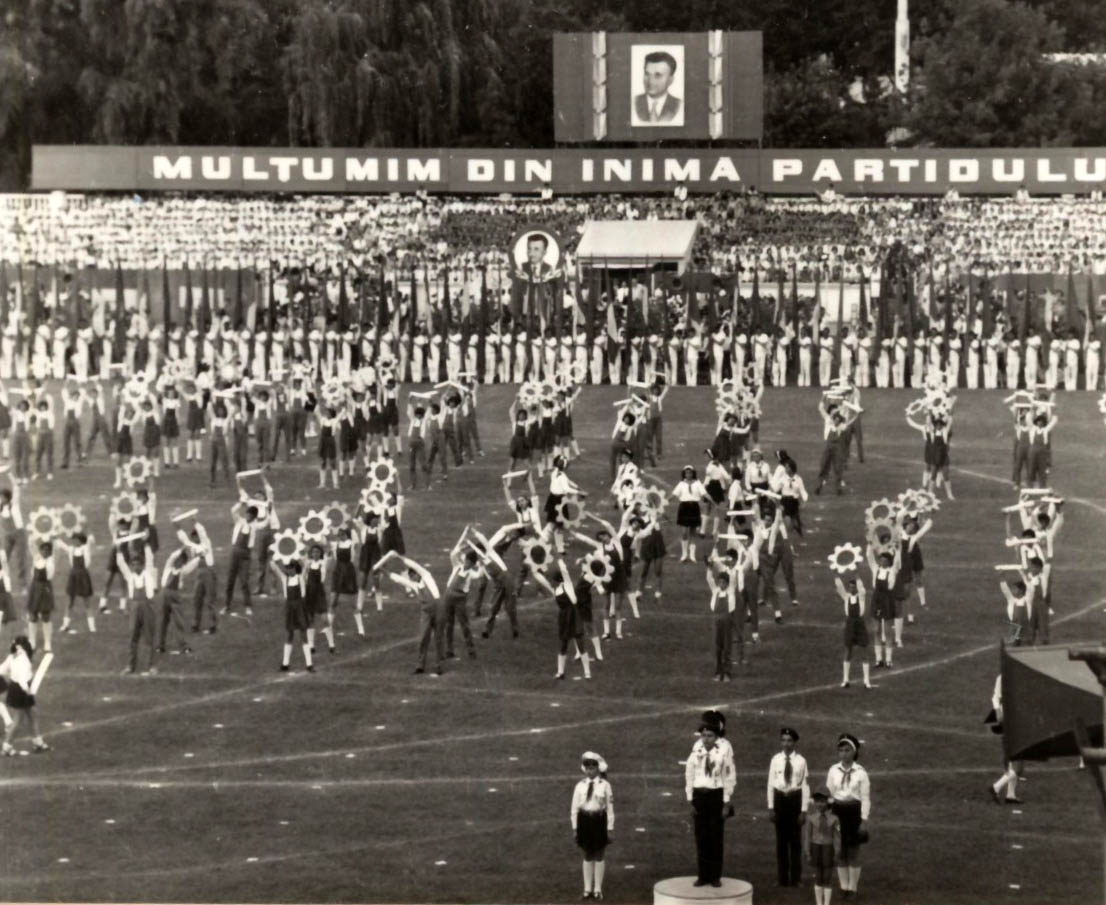
Mass games festival in Romania celebrating Pioneer Day on 18 June 1977

In Romania, the communist government organized compulsory mass games after General Secretary Nicolae Ceauşescu and his wife had visited the People's Republic of China and witnessed the event there.

== See also ==
- Turners
- Government-organized demonstration
- Propaganda in North Korea
- World Gymnaestrada
