= Mokran House =

Banquet hall in Pyongyang, North Korea

The Mokran House (Korean: 목란관; Hanja: 木蘭館) is a banquet hall in Pyongyang, North Korea. It is used for official ceremonies, including to welcome foreign guests.

A reception attended by Kim Jong Un, Pak Thae-song, Choe Ryong-hae, Jo Yong-won and others was held at Mokran House on October 10, 2025 for the 80th anniversary of the Workers' Party of Korea.

The building opened in 1980 and is housed within a large white marble hexigonal interior, it was also the recording site for performances for the Pochonbo Electronic Ensemble in the 1990s.

The stage housed within Mokran House uses a total of 6 color changing ambient side-lights and more than 14 different electromechanical motorized sliding backdrops which have rarely been recorded since the 1990s.
