= Sino-Korean Friendship Tower =

Monument in Pyongyang, North Korea

Coordinates: 39°03′03″N 125°45′21″E

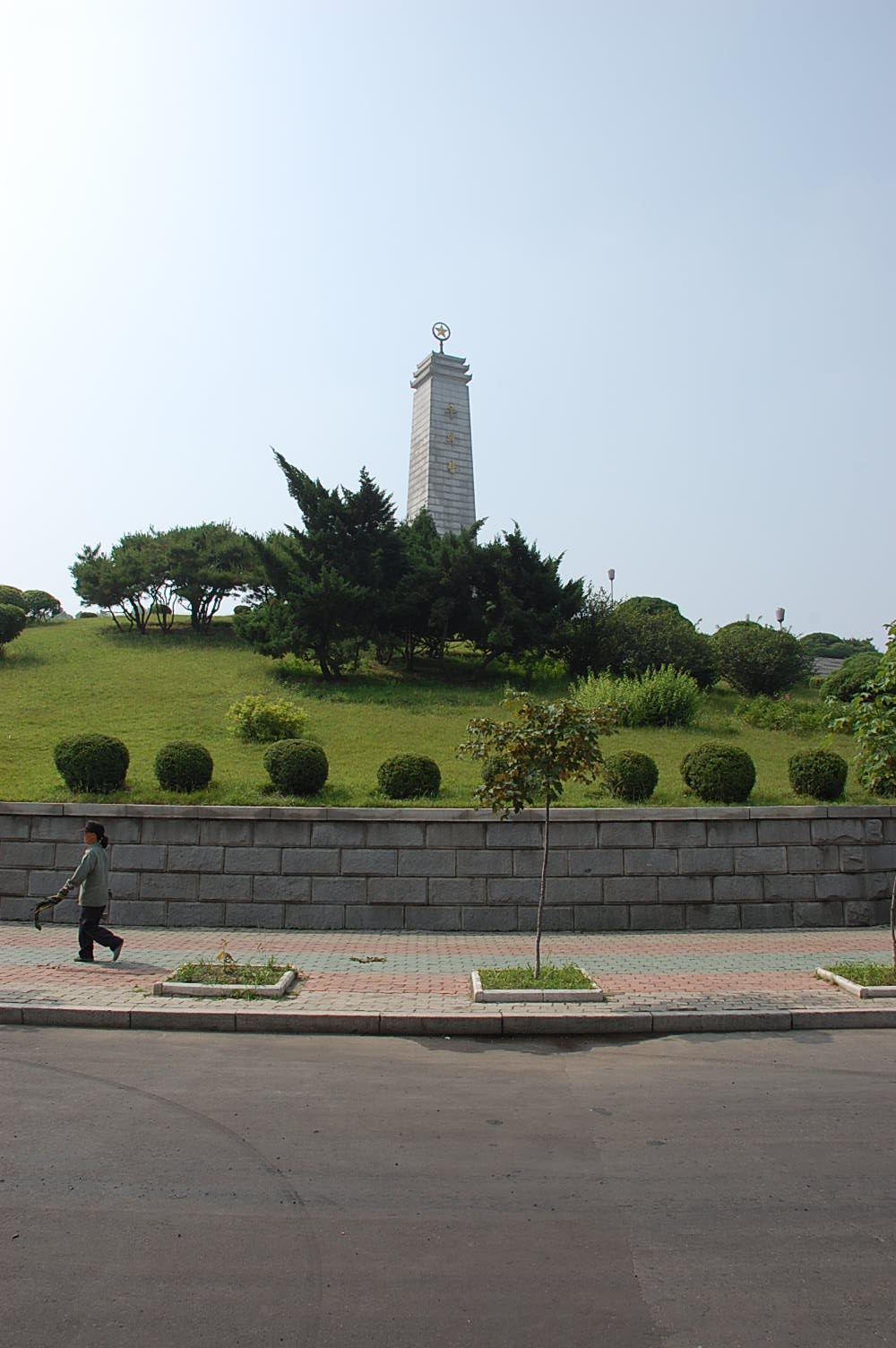
The tower

The Sino-Korean Friendship Tower (Korean: 우의탑; Hanja: 友誼塔) is located at the foot of Moranbong Hill in Pyongyang, the capital of North Korea, and is a landmark of Pyongyang. It was built on 25 October 1959, to commemorate the 9th anniversary of the Chinese People's Volunteer Army's support for the Korean War in 1950 and to honor the soldiers who died in the war.

The tower has a total area of 120,000 square meters and a height of 30 meters. It consists of a tower body with a first and second floor and a five-pointed star top, which has the internal structure of the Jade Pavilion. The tower is built with 1,025 natural granite and marble blocks, symbolizing the anniversary of the Chinese People's Volunteers' participation in the Korean War on October 25.

The front of the tower has an inscription in Korean praising the great achievements of the Chinese People's Volunteer Army martyrs and the friendship between the two countries. The bases on both sides are carved with reliefs depicting soldiers from both countries fighting side by side.

To this day, the Friendship Tower remains a symbol of "Sino-Korean friendship," and personnel from the Chinese Embassy in North Korea regularly lay wreaths there to commemorate the Chinese People's Volunteer Army soldiers who died in the war.

== Inscription ==
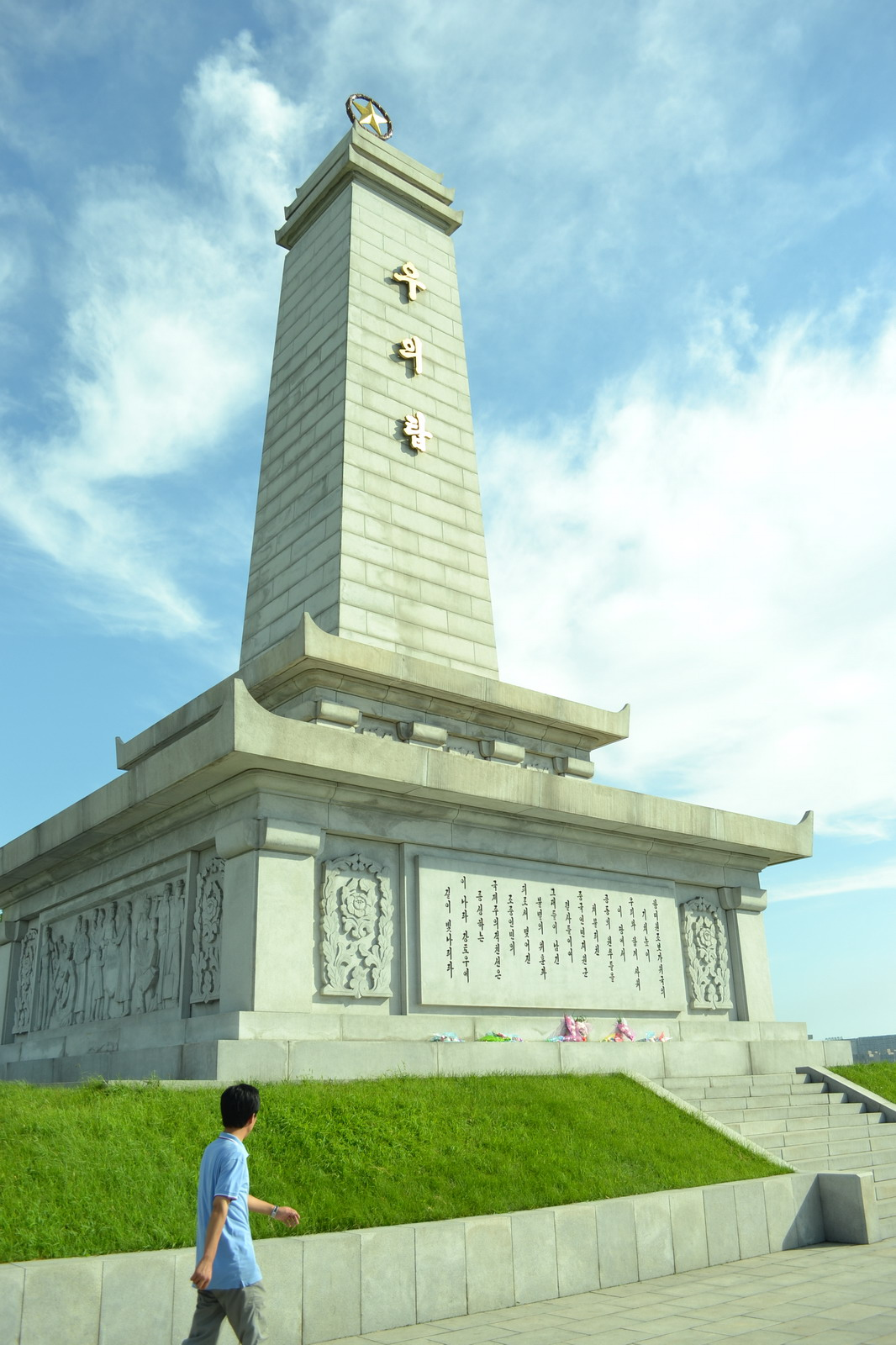
The friendship tower

The original Korean text of the inscription:

항미원조보가위국의기치높이우리와함께싸워이땅에 서공동의원쑤들을쳐물리친중국인민지원군렬사들이여 그대들이남긴불멸의위훈과피로써맺어진조중인민의국 제주의적친선은륭성하는이나라강토우에길이빛나리라

The inscription's meaning:

To the martyrs of the Chinese People's Volunteer Army who held high the banner of resisting U.S. aggression and aiding Korea, and defending our homeland, and who fought alongside us to defeat our common enemy on this land! Your immortal achievements and the internationalist friendship between the Chinese and Korean people forged with their blood will shine forever on this prosperous land!
