= Central Cadres Training School of the Workers' Party of Korea =

University in Pyongyang, North Korea

- 조선로동당 중앙간부학교
- Type: Party university
- Established: 1 June 1946
- Director: Ri Yong Sik
- Students: 1,200
- Location: Kumsusan area, Taesong-guyok, Pyongyang, North Korea; 39°02′49.5″N 125°48′22.4″E

Central Cadres Training School of the Workers' Party of Korea (Korean: 조선로동당 중앙간부학교) is a key party-political educational institution in North Korea responsible for training and preparing the managerial staff of the Workers' Party of Korea and the state apparatus that is part of the Central Committee of the Workers' Party of Korea.

== History ==
It was founded on June 1, 1946, as the Central Party School of the Communist Party of North Korea based in Pyongyang, on the basis of the existing since November 1945 Kim Il Sung High School, who prepares political and educational officers and translators of the Russian language. On the sixtieth birthday of Kim Il Sung, in April 1972, his name was given to the university - the Kim Il Sung Higher Party School (김일성고급당학교). A year later, in 1973, the university was integrated with the Marxist–Leninist School. Since 1978, it has been operating on the rights of the central educational institution.

In February 2020, the party committee of the training base was disbanded due to corruption. Since the 8th Congress of the Workers' Party of Korea in January 2021, there were plans to build a new school. A new campus was built at the demolished Kumsusan Air Field which is located at the outskirts of Pyongyang to replace the existing one which was located at 39.02263176°N 125.76794360°E at Tongdaewon-guyok. The construction was reported to began at May 2023. and finished by 2024. The General Secretary of the Workers' Party of Korea Kim Jong Un inspected the new campus in May 2024. The inspection featured the portraits of Karl Marx and Vladimir Lenin in North Korea for the first time since 2012. The institution was reported to be serving with the new name of Central Cadres Training School of the Workers' Party of Korea. The new campus which have a total floor space of over 133 000 square meters was inaugurated on 21 May 2024, while the new school year opening ceremony was held on 1 June 2024.

== Staff ==
The lecturers are recruited from the management staff of the Central Committee, the Academy of Sciences and the Kim Il Sung University.

== See also ==
- Central Party School of the Chinese Communist Party
- Higher Party School of the CPSU
- "Karl Marx" Party Academy of the Socialist Unity Party of Germany
