= Guangji Temple =

Guangji Temple (simplified Chinese: 广济寺; traditional Chinese: 廣濟寺; pinyin: Guǎngjì Sì) may refer to:

- Guangji Temple (Beijing), in Beijing, China
- Guangji Temple (Hunan), in Hengyang, Hunan, China
- Guangji Temple (Jinzhou), in Jinzhou, Liaoning, China, a national historical and cultural site in Liaoning
- Guangji Temple (Tianjin), in Tianjin, China
- Guangji Temple (Xinzhou), in Wutai County, Xinzhou, Shanxi, China
- A temple on Mount Wutai, Shanxi, China
- Guangji Temple (Wuhu), in Wuhu, Anhui, China
- Guangji Temple Hua'an Shrine, in Baihe District, Tainan, Taiwan
- Guangji Temple Main Hall, a national historical and cultural site in Shanxi
