= List of Major National Historical and Cultural Sites in Liaoning =

This list is of Major Sites Protected for their Historical and Cultural Value at the National Level in Liaoning Province, China.

| Site | Chinese name | Location | Designation | Image |
|---|---|---|---|---|
| Memorial Tower of Sino-Soviet Friendship | Zhong-Su youyi jinian ta 中苏友谊纪念塔 | Dalian | 1-32 | Upload file |
| Fengguo Temple | Fengguo si 奉国寺 | 41°32′34″N 121°14′33″E Yi County | 1-86 | Upload file |
| Mukden Palace | Shenyang gugong 沈阳故宫 | 41°47′46″N 123°26′58″E Shenyang | 1-112 | Upload file |
| Painted Tombs at Liaoyang | Liaoyang bihua muqun 辽阳壁画墓群 | Liaoyang | 1-167 | Upload file |
| Zhao Mausoleum (Qing Dynasty) | Qing Zhaoling 清昭陵 | 34°36′00″N 108°32′00″E Shenyang | 2-61 | Upload file |
| Site of the Pingdingshan Massacre | Pingdingshan can'an yizhi 平顶山惨案遗址 | 41°50′02″N 123°55′32″E Fushun | 3-34 | Upload file |
| Wanfotang Caves | Wanfotang shiku 万佛堂石窟 | Yi County | 3-45 | Upload file |
| City Wall of Xingcheng | Xingcheng gucheng 兴城古城 | 40°37′16″N 120°42′27″E Xingcheng | 3-62 | Upload file |
| Beizhen Temple | Beizhen miao 北镇庙 | 41°35′39″N 121°45′22″E Beizhen | 3-127 | Upload file |
| Xuanzhen Temple | Xuanzhen guan 玄贞观 | 40°24′06″N 122°21′31″E Gaizhou | 3-128 | Upload file |
| Chaoyang North Pagoda | Chaoyang Beita 朝阳北塔 | Chaoyang | 3-140 | Upload file |
| Twin Pagodas of the Chongxing Temple | Chongxing si shuangta 崇兴寺双塔 | Beizhen | 3-151 | Upload file |
| White Pagoda of Liaoyang | Liaoyang Baita 辽阳白塔 | Liaoyang | 3-152 | Upload file |
| Lüshun Russo-Japanese Prison | Lüshun jianyu jiuzhi 旅顺监狱旧址 | Dalian | 3-160 | Upload file |
| Jinniushan site | Jinniushan yizhi 金牛山遗址 | Dashiqiao | 3-183 | Upload file |
| Niuheliang site | Niuheliang yizhi 牛河梁遗址 | Lingyuan | 3-195 | Upload file |
| Jiangnüshi site | Jiangnüshi yizhi 姜女石遗址 | Suizhong County | 3-208 | Upload file |
| Yongling Mausoleum | Yongling 永陵 | 41°42′28″N 124°47′48″E Xinbin County | 3-256 | Upload file |
| Fuling Mausoleum | Fuling 福陵 | 41°49′34″N 123°34′49″E Shenyang | 3-257 | Upload file |
| Chahai Site | Chahai yizhi 查海遗址 | 42°11′03″N 121°48′09″E Fuxin County | 4-7 | Upload file |
| Wunü Mountain City | Wunüshan shancheng 五女山山城 | 41°19′36″N 125°24′42″E Huanren County | 4-36 | Upload file |
| Fenghuangshan Mountain City | Fenghuangshan shancheng 凤凰山山城 | Fengcheng | 4-37 | Upload file |
| Shipengshan Dolmen | Shipengshan shipeng 石棚山石棚 | 40°04′00″N 122°03′33″E Gaizhou | 4-58 | Upload file |
| Great Wall at Jiumenkou | Wanli changcheng - Jiumenkou 万里长城—九门口 | Suizhong County | 4-136 | Upload file |
| Russian Architecture of Dalian | Dalian Eguo jianzhu 大连俄国建筑 | Dalian | 4-201 | Upload file |
| Former Residence of Zhang Xueliang | Zhang Xueliang jiuju 张学良旧居 | Shenyang | 4-221 | Upload file |
| Xianrendong | Haicheng Xianrendong yizhi 海城仙人洞遗址 | Haicheng | 5-23 | Upload file |
| Xinle site | Xinle yizhi 新乐遗址 | Shenyang | 5-24 | Upload file |
| Dongshanzui Site | Dongshanzui yizhi 东山嘴遗址 | Harqin Left Wing Mongol Autonomous County | 5-25 | Upload file |
| Ximucheng Dolmen | Ximucheng shipeng 析木城石棚 | Haicheng | 5-155 | Upload file |
| Yemaotai Liao tombs | Yemaotai Liao mu 叶茂台辽墓 | 42°19′03″N 122°52′35″E Faku County | 5-156 | Upload file |
| Old Buildings of Guangji Temple | Guangji si gujianzhuqun 广济寺古建筑群 | Jinzhou | 5-282 | Upload file |
| Great Wall of Yan | Changcheng - Yan changcheng yizhi 长城—燕长城遗址 | Jianping County | 5—442(4) | Upload file |
| Modern Architecture of Zhongshan Square, Dalian | Dalian Zhongshan guangchang jindai jianzhuqun 大连中山广场近代建筑群 | Dalian | 5-478 | Upload file |
| Northeastern University site | Dongbei daxue jiuzhi 东北大学旧址 | Shenyang | 5-479 | Upload file |
| Miaohoushan Site | Miaohoushan yizhi 庙后山遗址 | Benxi Manchu Autonomous County | 6-47 | Upload file |
| Gaotaishan Site | Gaotaishan yizhi 高台山遗址 | Xinmin | 6-48 | Upload file |
| Shitaizi Mountain City | Shitaizi shancheng 石台子山城 | Shenyang | 6-49 | Upload file |
| Hetu Ala | Hetu'ala gucheng 赫图阿拉故城 | Xinbin Manchu Autonomous County | 6-50 | Upload file |
| Yuantaizi Tomb | Yuan taizi mu 袁台子墓 | Chaoyang County | 6-242 | Upload file |
| Tomb of Feng Sufu | Feng Sufu mu 冯素弗墓 | Beipiao | 6-243 | Upload file |
| Pagoda of Yunjie Temple | Yunjie si ta 云接寺塔 | 41°32′03″N 120°30′20″E Chaoyang | 6-497 | Upload file |
| Zhongqiansuocheng | Zhongqiansuocheng 中前所城 | Suizhong County | 6-498 | Upload file |
| Guangning Site | Guangning cheng 广宁城 | Beizhen | 6-499 | Upload file |
| Youshun Temple | Youshun si 佑顺寺 | 41°34′29″N 120°27′20″E Chaoyang | 6-500 | Upload file |
| Shengshui Temple | Shengshui si 圣水寺 | Huludao | 6-501 | Upload file |
| Wanzhong Cemetery | Wanzhong mu 万忠墓 | Dalian | 6-914 | Upload file |
| Xibe Clan Temple | Xibozu jiamiao 锡伯族家庙 | Shenyang | 6-915 | Upload file |
| Xipaotai Site | Xipaotai yizhi 西炮台遗址 | Yingkou | 6-916 | Upload file |
| Museum of the Residence of the Governors of Guandong | Guandong ting bowuguan jiuzhi 关东厅博物馆旧址 | Dalian | 6-917 | Upload file |
| Fuxin Mass Grave | Fuxin wanrenkeng 阜新万人坑 | Fuxin | 6-918 | Upload file |
| Yalu River Broken Bridge | Yalu Jiang duanqiao 鸭绿江断桥 | Dandong | 6-919 | Upload file |
| Fushun War Criminals Management Centre | Fushun zhanfan guanlisuo jiuzhi 抚顺战犯管理所旧址 | 41°53′02″N 123°54′05″E Fushun | 6-920 | Upload file |

== See also ==
- Principles for the Conservation of Heritage Sites in China
