= Yalu River Broken Bridge =

Historic defunct China–Korea bridge

Yalu River Broken Bridge 鸭绿江断桥
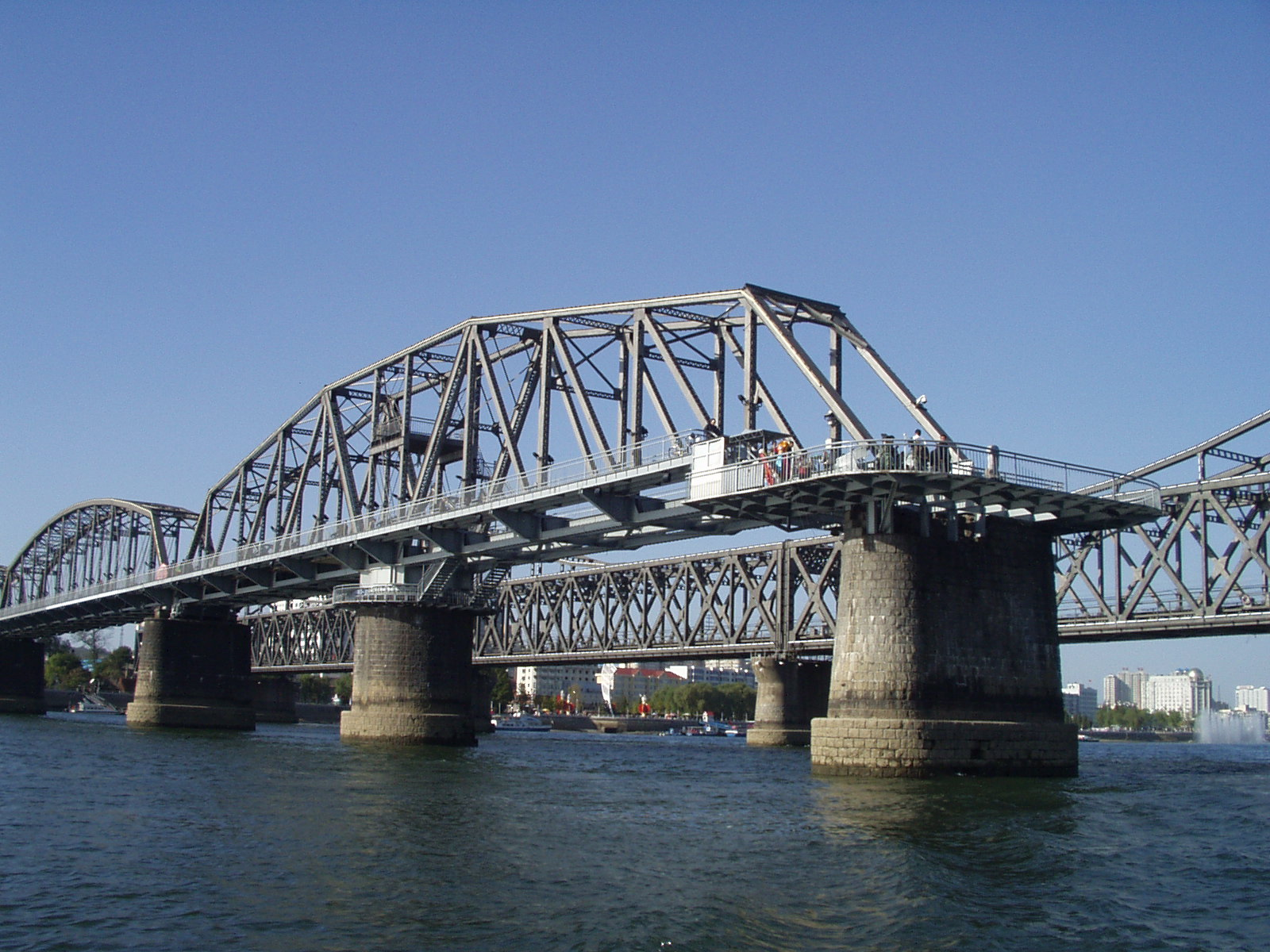
- The former swing span at the south end of the bridge's surviving portion
- Coordinates: 40.1149°N 124.3915°E
- Crosses: Yalu River
- Locale: Dandong, Liaoning, China

Characteristics
- Material: Steel
- Total length: Originally 944.2 m (3,098 ft)
- Width: 11 m (36 ft)

History
- Opened: October 1911
- Closed: 1950–1951

Location
- Interactive map of Yalu River Broken Bridge

The Yalu River Broken Bridge (simplified Chinese: 鸭绿江断桥; traditional Chinese: 鴨綠江斷橋; pinyin: Yālù Jiāng Duàn Qiáo) is a truncated railway swing bridge converted to a viewing platform and historical site in the city of Dandong in Northeast China. Constructed in 1911 by the Empire of Japan, it was the first bridge built across the Yalu River and connected the Chinese city of Dandong with the Korean city of Sinuiju, in what is now North Korea. The bridge linked Japanese-ruled Korea to the Eurasian rail network. The bridge originally consisted of twelve truss spans supported by stone foundations in the riverbed. During the Korean War (1950-1953), the eight spans over the Korean side of the river were badly damaged by American bombing and were later dismantled. The bridge was not rebuilt. In 1993, the government of Dandong converted the remaining four spans on the Chinese side of the Yalu into a historical site with a walkway and viewing platform.

== Location and dimension ==
The railway bridge is located in Dandong, Liaoning, China, across the Yalu River from Sinuiji, North Korea. It was a steel truss bridge 944.2 metres (3,098 ft) long and 11 metres (36 ft) wide, with 12 spans. Its fourth span was a swing bridge that could be rotated to allow the passing of tall ships.

== History ==
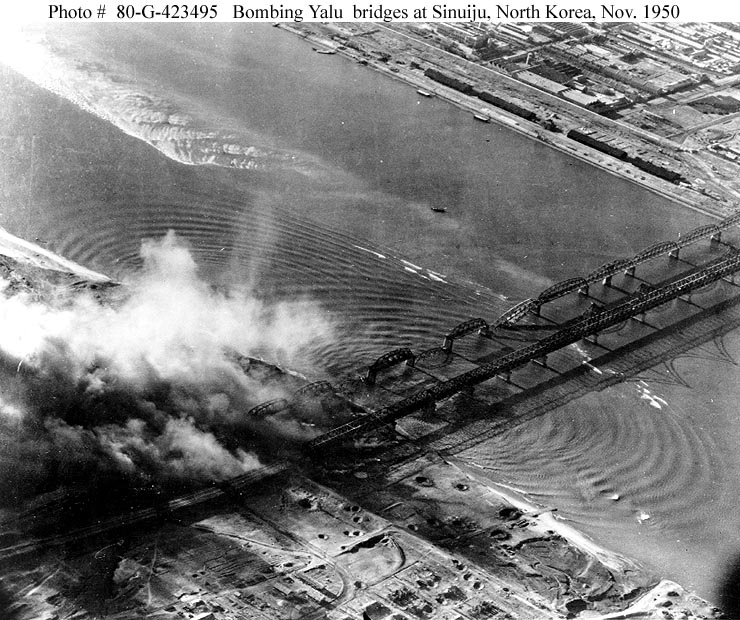
Aerial photograph taken in November 1950 during air attacks by US bombers. The Broken Bridge is on the left.

The bridge was built by the Empire of Japan in 1911, to connect Japanese-ruled Korea with the Eurasian rail network. With its completion, the southern Korean port of Busan became connected by rail all the way to Calais, France. The Japanese began building the bridge in 1909, before the Qing dynasty government of China granted permission for its construction. By April 1910, with the Korean side of the bridge already half completed, Japan applied heavy pressure on the weak Qing government, then in its last throes, to authorize construction on the Chinese side. It was opened in October 1911, the first bridge across the Yalu River. In April 1937, when Northeast China was ruled by the Japanese puppet state Manchukuo, Japan built a bigger bridge less than 100 metres (330 ft) upstream, now known as the Sino-Korean Friendship Bridge.

During the Korean War, the United States Air Force repeatedly bombed the Yalu River bridges to disrupt the transportation of Chinese troops and supplies into North Korea. On 8 November 1950, the US dispatched more than 100 B-29s to bomb the bridges, and six days later, another 34 bombers attacked and destroyed three spans of the older bridge. The aerial attacks were suspended on 5 December because the Yalu was frozen over and the Chinese could easily cross the river at many points. In February 1951, the US resumed bombing and damaged the bridge except four spans on the Chinese side. From then on it became known as the Broken Bridge.

== Heritage and tourism ==
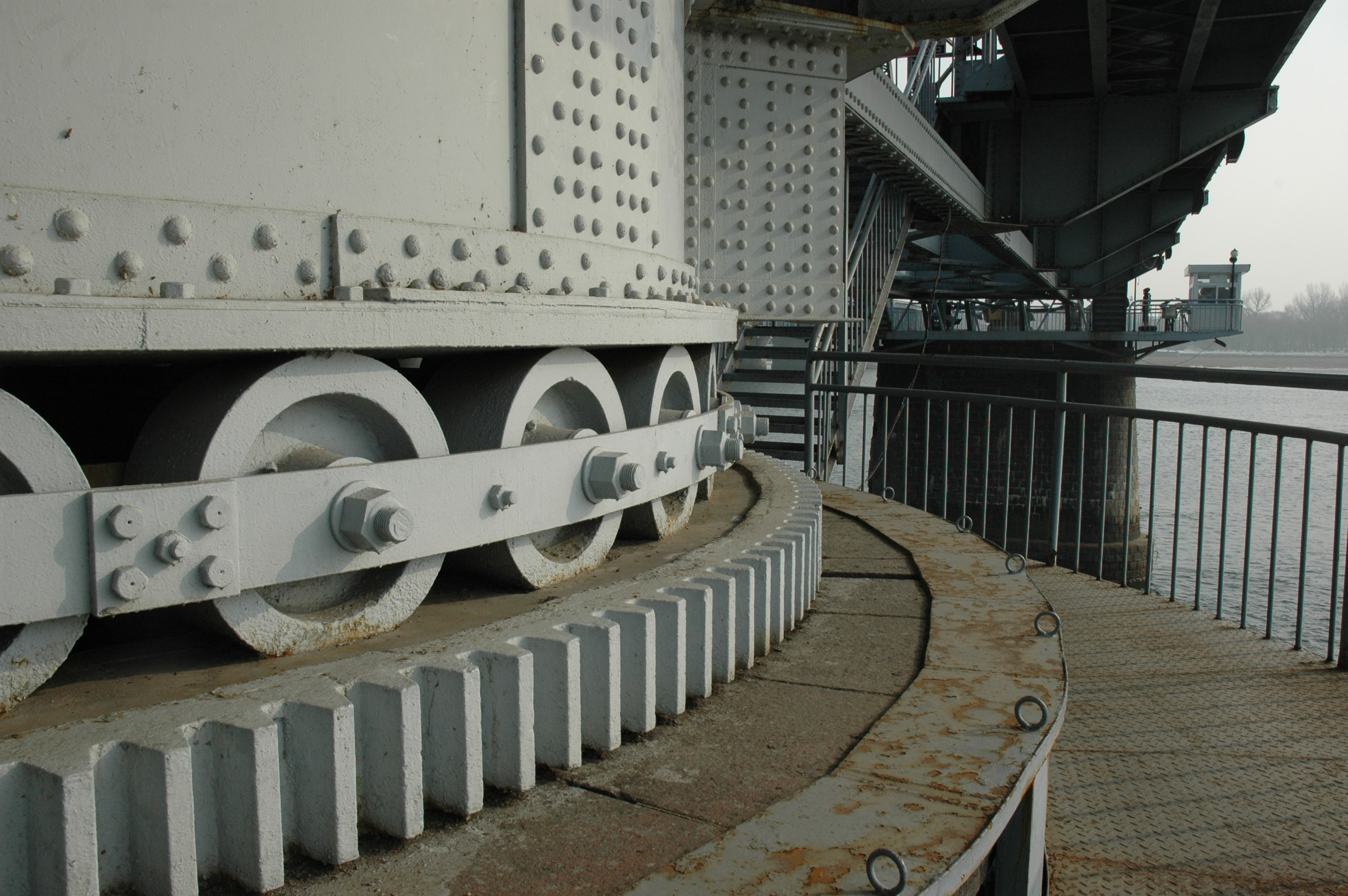
Close-up view of the disused swing-span rotation mechanism, now viewable from a walkway added in the 1990s

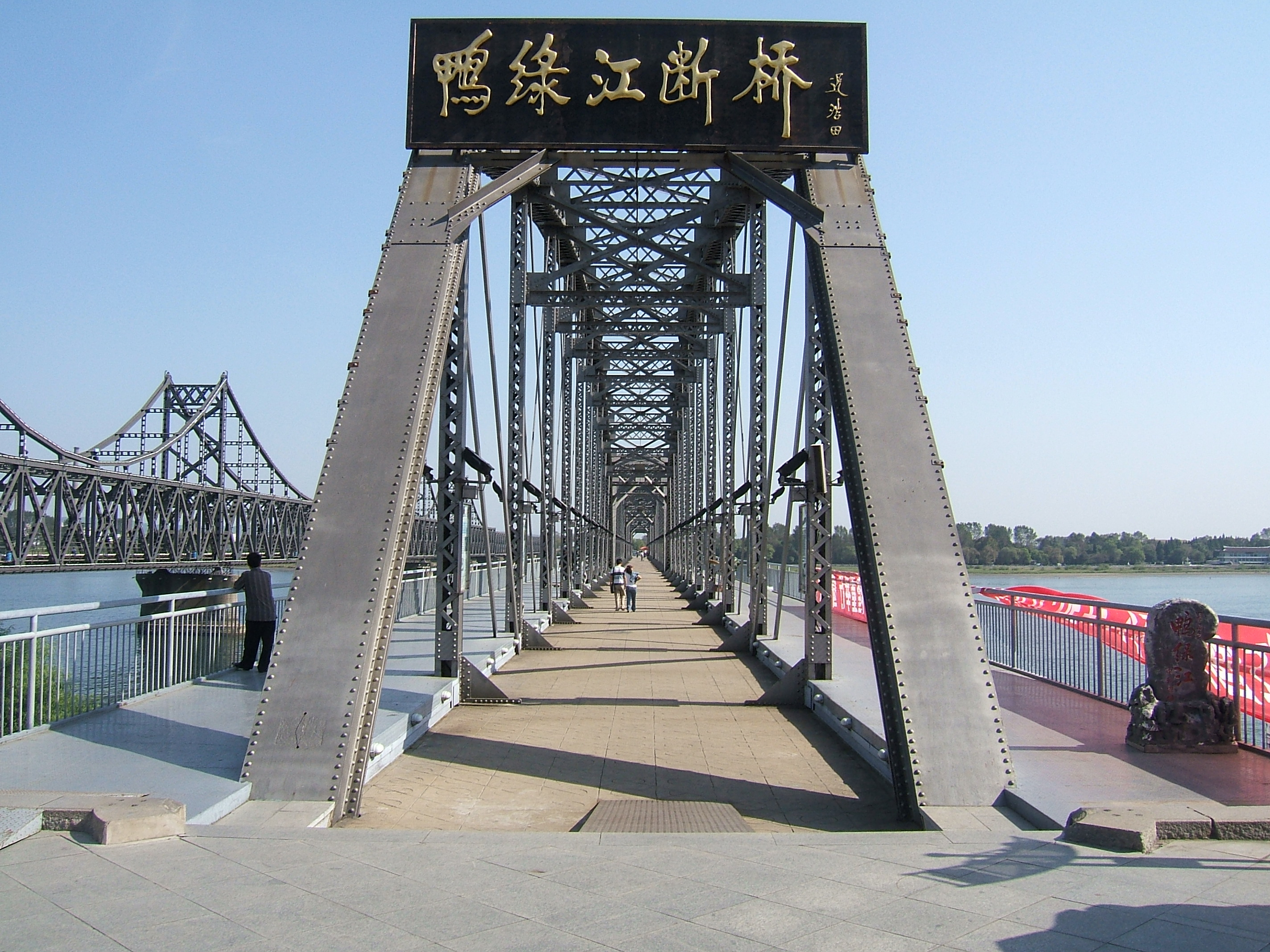
Looking onto the bridge from its north end

After the end of the Korean War, North Korea dismantled its side of the severely damaged bridge. Four spans on the Chinese side, pockmarked by shrapnel, were left in place and preserved. In 1988, the City of Dandong declared Broken Bridge a municipal heritage site.

In 1993, the local government invested 3 million yuan to refurbish the bridge and opened it as a tourist attraction. Visitors can walk on the bridge to the middle of the Yalu River. The end of the Broken Bridge has become a viewing platform for visitors to get a closer look at North Korea.

The Broken Bridge is now a Major National Historical and Cultural Site of China.

== See also ==
- New Yalu River Bridge, a new Chinese-built crossing that has been left incomplete for several years because North Korea has not completed building border control buildings.
- List of bridges in China
