= 1290 Zhili earthquake =

Earthquake in northeast China (27 September 1290)

- Location within China
- Local date: September 27, 1290
- Magnitude: 6.8 M_{s}
- Epicenter: 41.5°N 119.3°E
- Areas affected: Yuan dynasty
- Total damage: Severe
- Max. intensity: MMI IX (Violent)
- Casualties: 7,270–100,000

The 1290 Zhili earthquake occurred on 27 September with an epicenter near Ningcheng, Zhongshu Sheng (Zhili), Yuan China. This region is today administered as part of Inner Mongolia, China. The earthquake had an estimated surface-wave magnitude of 6.8 and a maximum felt intensity of IX (Violent) on the Mercalli intensity scale. One estimate places the death toll at 7,270, while another has it at 100,000.

== Damage ==
The earthquake destroyed 480 storehouses and countless houses in Ningcheng. Changping, Hejian, Renqiu, Xiongxian, Baoding, Yixian and Baixiang County were also affected. It severely damaged the Fengguo Temple in Yixian.

== See also ==
- List of earthquakes in China
- List of historical earthquakes
