= Lüshun Russo-Japanese Prison =

Former prison in Dalian, China

Coordinates: 38°49′29.7″N 121°15′52.3″E

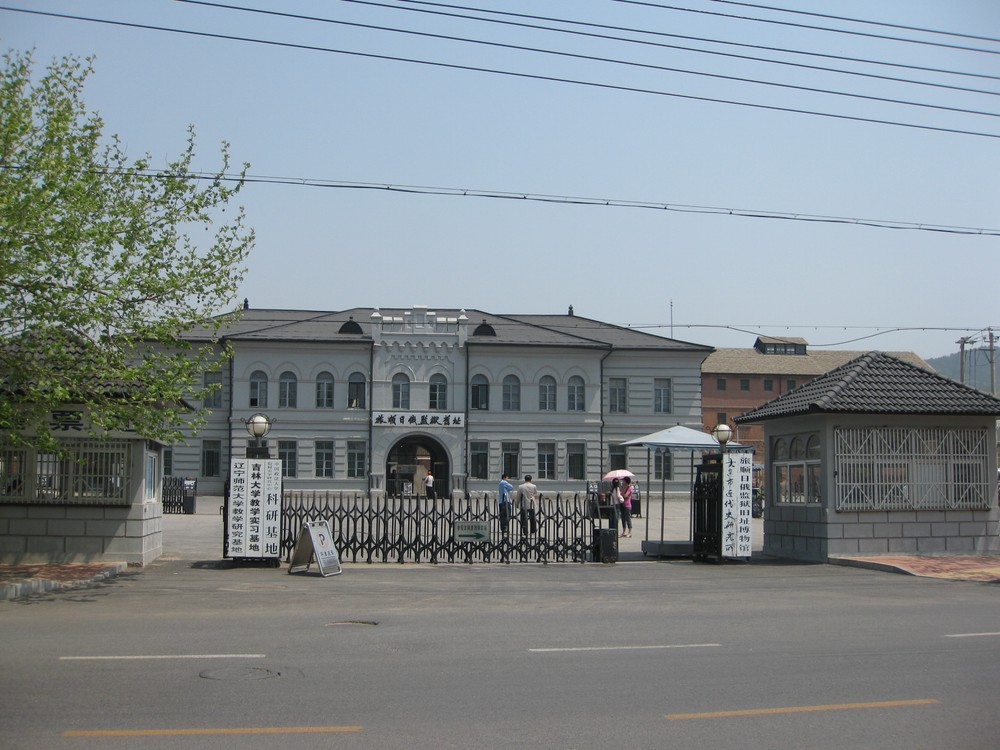
The entrance to the Lüshun Russo-Japanese Prison

The Lüshun Russo-Japanese Prison (Chinese: 旅顺日俄监狱, Russian: Люйшуньская тюрьма, Japanese: 旅順刑務所) is the former prison located in Lushunkou District, Dalian, Liaoning, China. It was built by Russia and later expanded by Japan.

== History ==
The Lüshun Russo-Japanese Prison is the former prison located in Lüshunkou District, Dalian, Liaoning Province. It was built by the Russian Empire in 1902 and expanded by the Empire of Japan in 1907. In 1939, it was called the "Lüshun Prison". The prison was discontinued after the Soviet Army entered Lüshun in 1945, but was reopened in July 1971, and turned into a memorial facility as "Former Japanese Lüshun Prison".

In 1988, the Lüshun Prison was designated as PRC's Major Historical and Cultural Site Protected at the National Level (third edition). It is now the "Former Lüshun Russo-Japanese Prison Museum".

The prison mainly held activist from Manchuria and Korea at the time, as well as anti-war people from the Soviet Union, Egypt, and Japan. Reportedly, a cumulative total of more than 20,000 people were detained there between 1906 and 1936, and about 700 were executed between 1942 and August 1945. They included An Jung-geun, Lee Hoe-yeong and Sin Chaeho, all notable Korean independence activists.

== Gallery ==
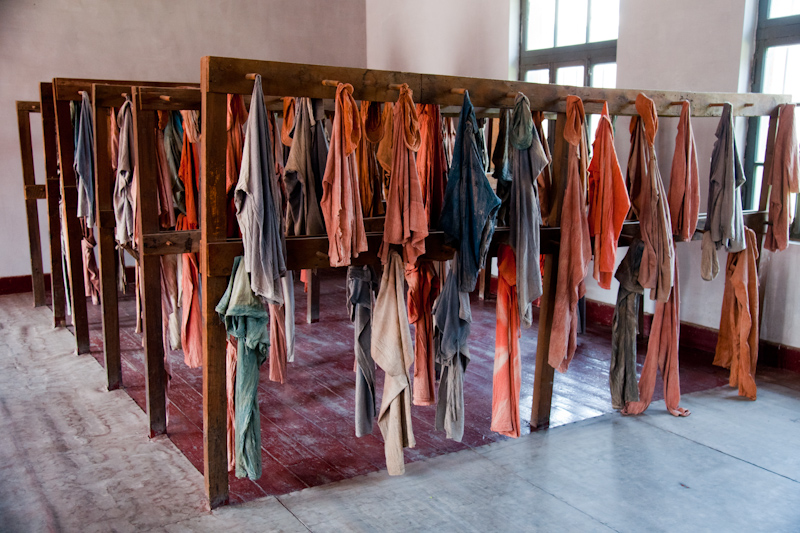
Prison uniforms

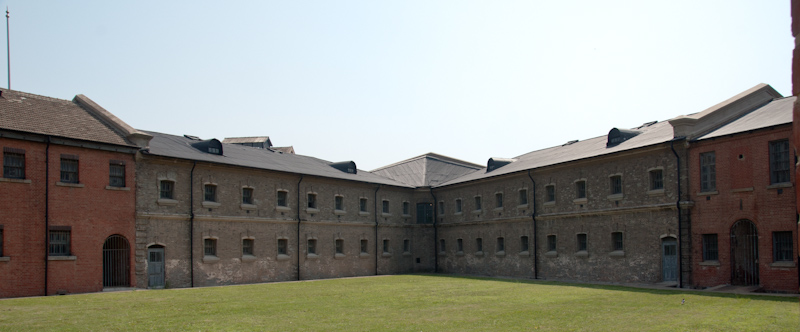
Solitary confinement blocks

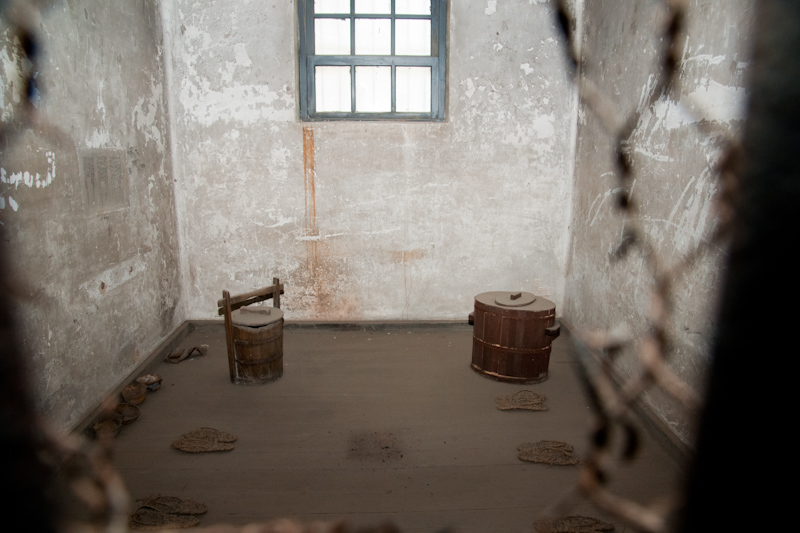
Each cell up to ten prisoners

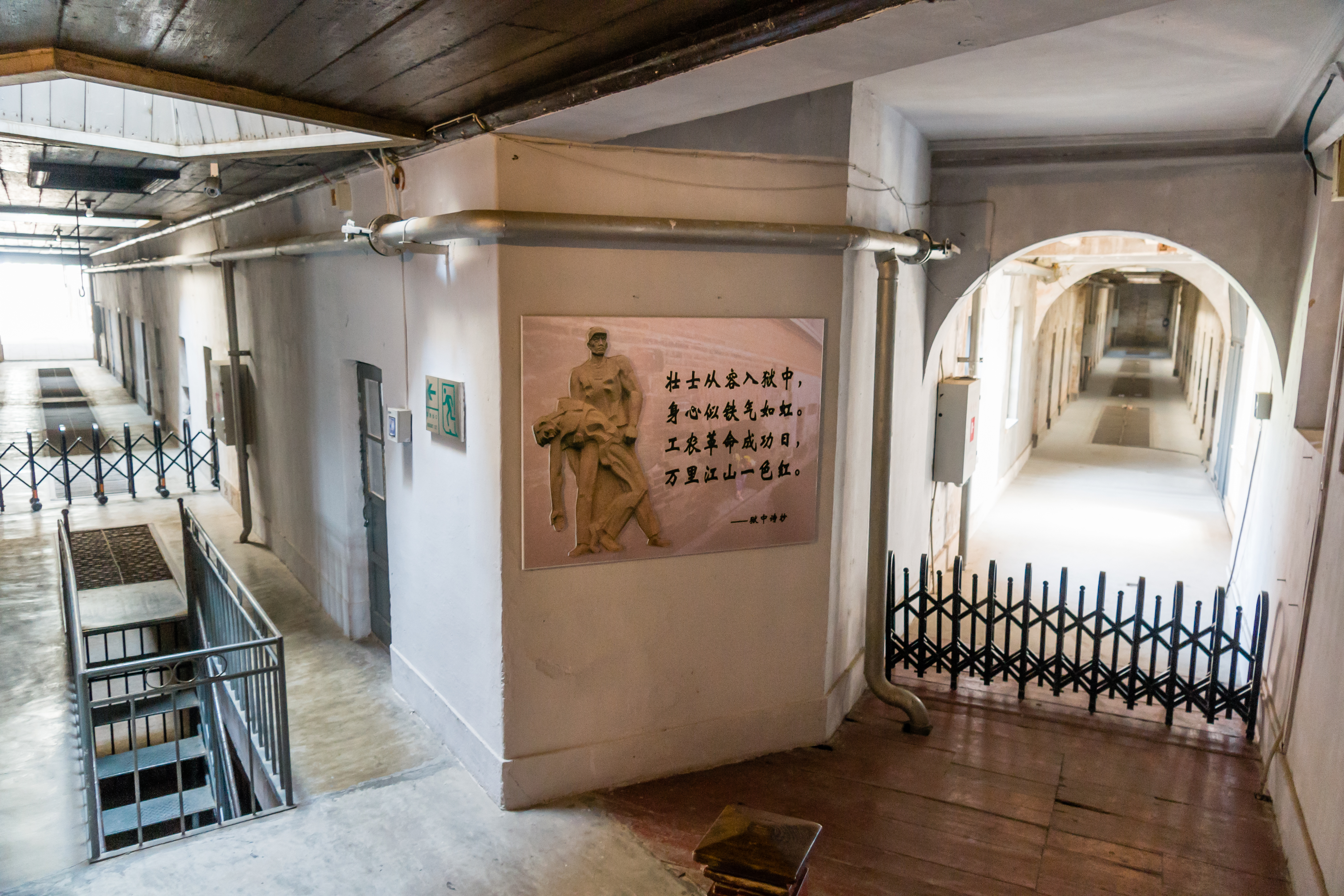
The guard tower to watch over multiple cells

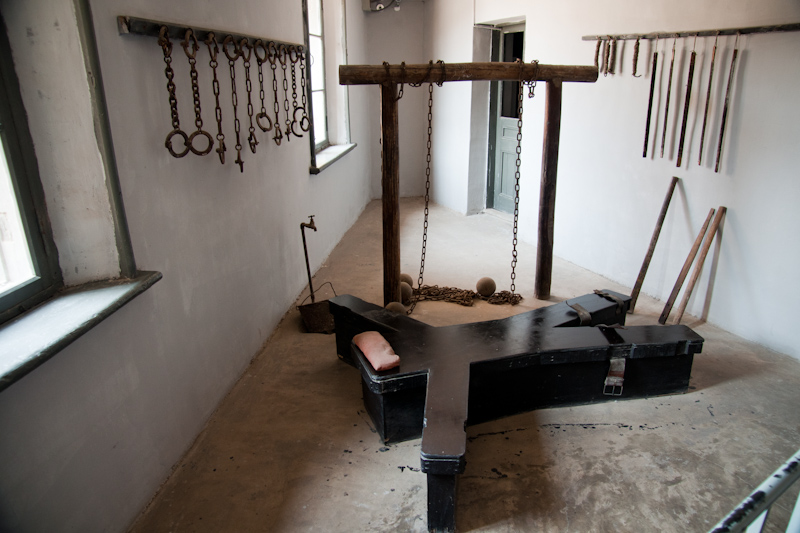
A torture chamber

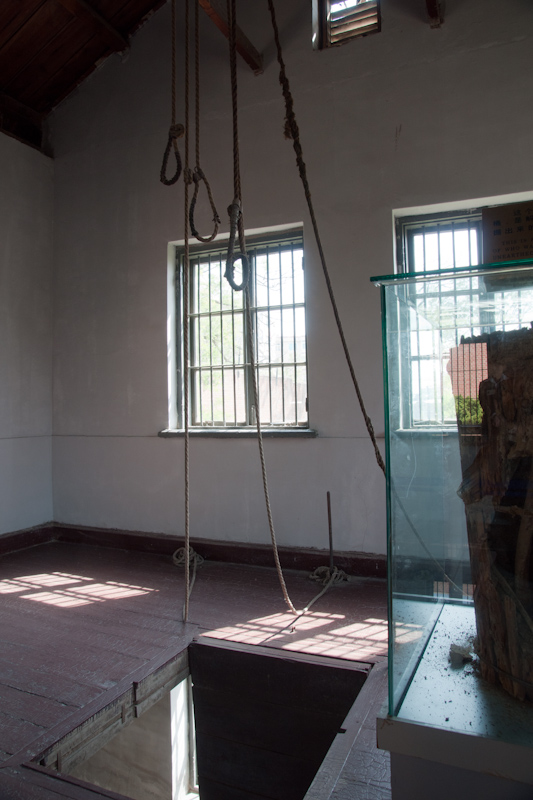
The execution chamber

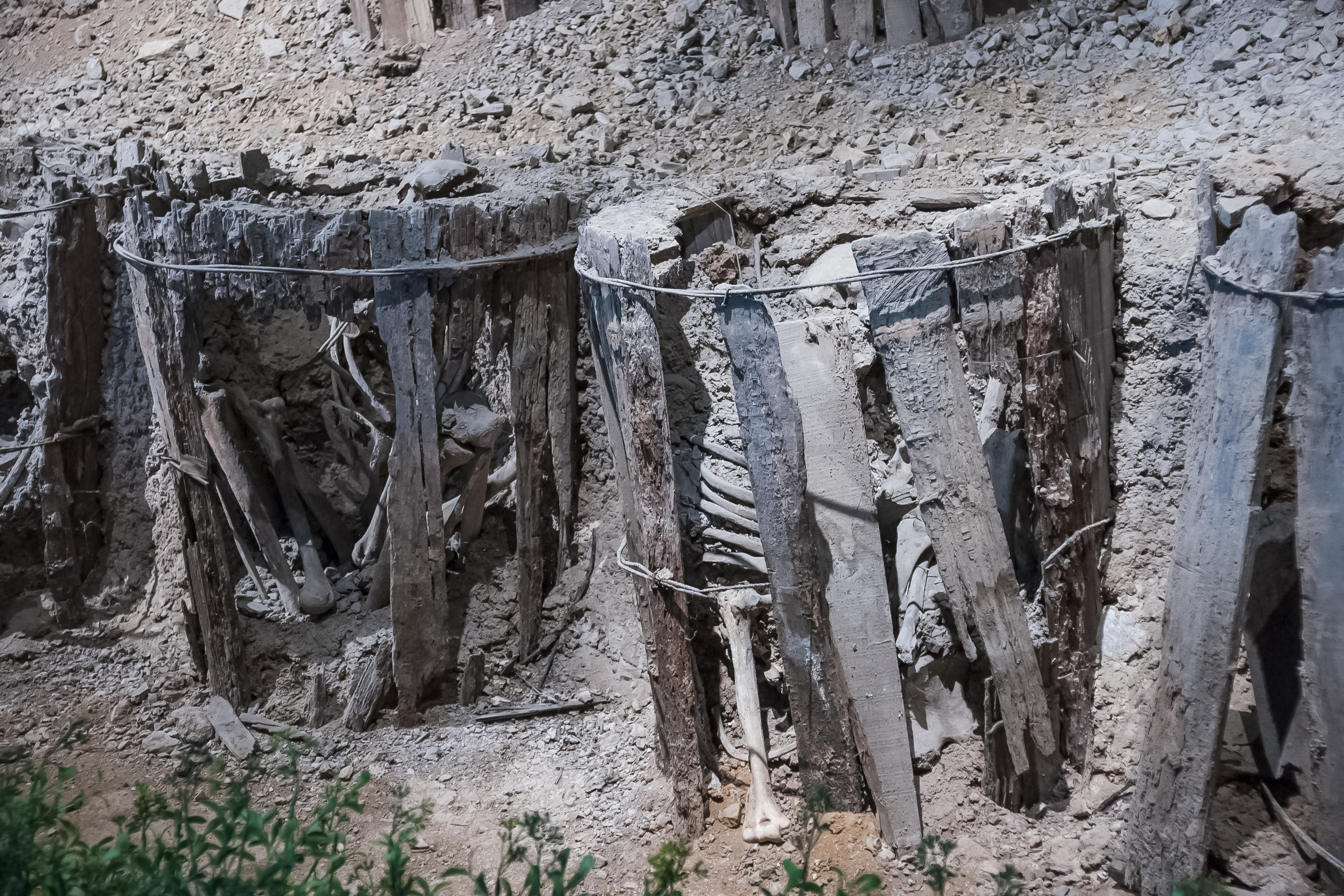
The burial ground

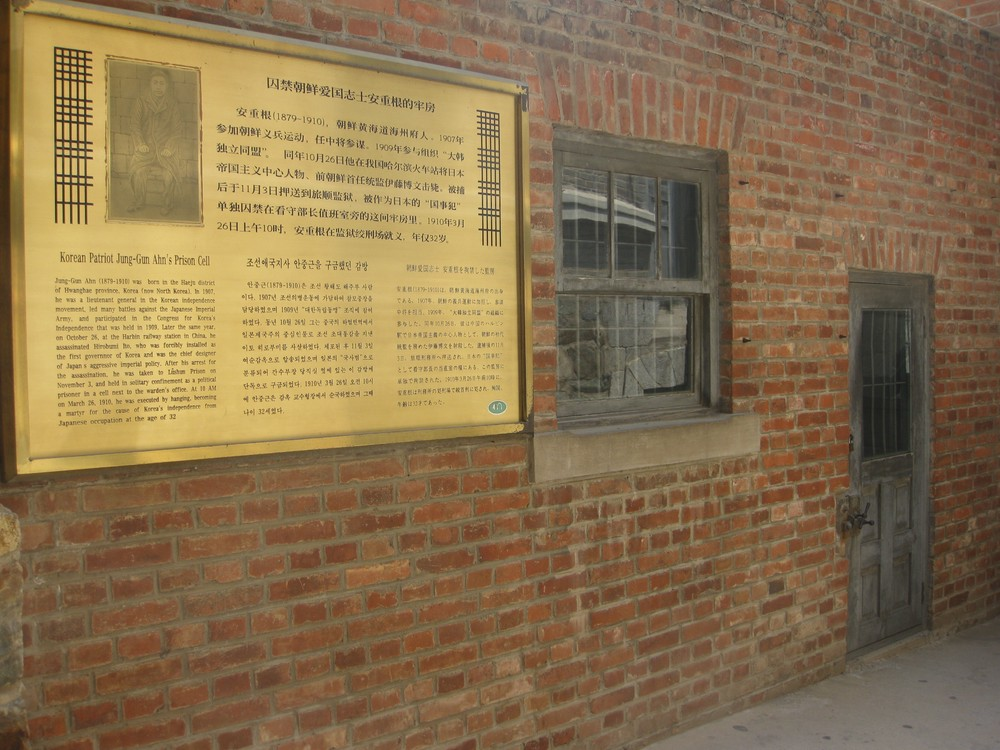
An Jung-geun's cell

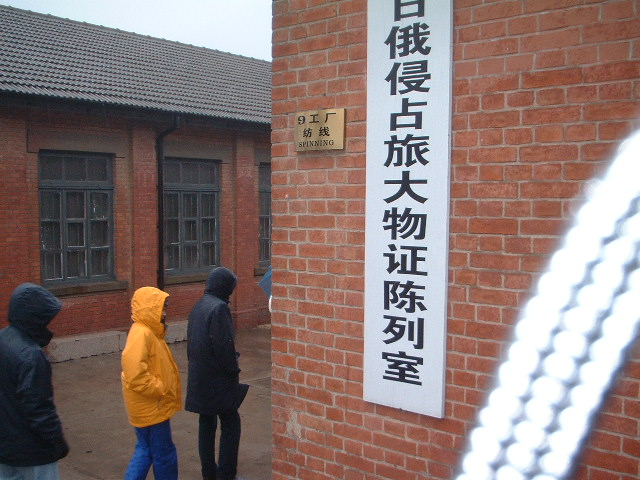
Exhibition Building, a warehouse

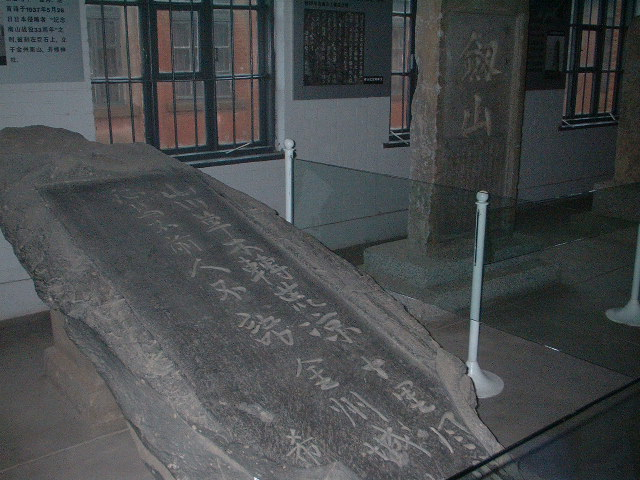
The stele of Maresuke Nogi's poem about the Battle of Nanshan, stored in Exhibition Building

== See also ==
- List of Major National Historical and Cultural Sites in Liaoning
