= An Jung-geun =

Korean independence activist (1879–1910)

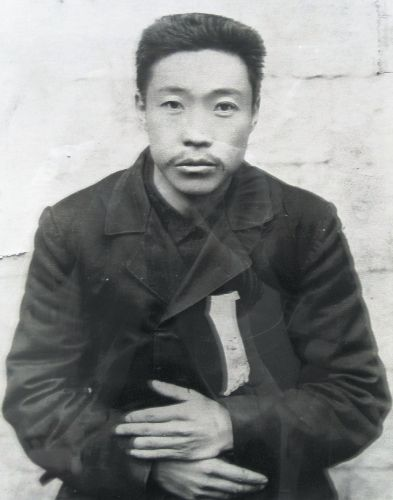
- An c. 1910
- Born: 2 September 1879; Haeju, Hwanghae Province, Joseon
- Died: 26 March 1910 (aged 30); Ryojun, Kwantung Leased Territory, Empire of Japan
- Cause of death: Execution by hanging
- Other name: Thomas (Christian name)
- Known for: Assassination of Itō Hirobumi in 1909
- Parents: An Taehun (father); Jo Maria (mother)
- Awards: Order of Merit for National Foundation (Posthumously)

Korean name
- Hangul: 안중근
- Hanja: 安重根
- RR: An Junggeun
- MR: An Chunggŭn
- IPA: [ɐndʑuŋɡɯn]

An Jung-geun (Korean: 안중근; 2 September 1879 – 26 March 1910), courtesy name An Eungchil (Korean: 안응칠; Hanja: 安應七), was a Korean independence activist who assassinated Itō Hirobumi, former Prime Minister of Japan and Japanese Resident-General of Korea, in Harbin, China in 1909. An was imprisoned and executed by Japanese imperial forces at Lüshun Russo-Japanese Prison in 1910.

An is honored as a martyr by the governments of South Korea, North Korea, Republic of China and People's Republic of China, while the Japanese government regards him as a terrorist. The Catholic Church excommunicated him for the assassination; the excommunication was lifted in 1993.

== Background ==
An's family produced many other Korean independence activists. An's cousin An Myeong-Geun (안명근; 安明根) attempted to assassinate Terauchi Masatake, the first Japanese Governor-General of Korea (조선총독; 朝鮮總督) who executed the Japan-Korea Annexation Treaty in 1910. He failed, however, and was imprisoned for 15 years; he died in 1926. An's brothers An Jeong-Geun (안정근; 安定根) and An Gong-Geun (안공근; 安恭根), as well as An's cousin An Gyeong-Geun (안경근; 安敬根) and nephew An Woo-Saeng (안우생; 安偶生), joined the Provisional Government of the Republic of Korea in Shanghai, China, which was led by Kim Ku, and fought against Japan. An Chun-Saeng (안춘생; 安春生), another nephew of An's, joined the National Revolutionary Army of China, participated in battles against Japanese forces at Shanghai, and joined the Korean Liberation Army in 1940. Later, he became a lieutenant general of the Republic of Korea Army and a member of the National Assembly of South Korea.

Meanwhile, An Jung-Geun's youngest son, Ahn Jun-saeng became a prominent businessman and Chinilpa during the Japanese occupation of Korea. He died in 1952 from tuberculosis, with his children emigrating to the United States after the war.

- Grandfather
  - An In-su (안인수; 安仁壽)
- Father
  - An Tae-hun (안태훈; 安泰勳)
- Mother
  - Jo Maria (趙瑪利亞, 조마리아) of the Baecheon Jo clan (배천 조씨; 6 May 1862 – 25 July 1927)
- Sister
  - Younger sister: An Seong-nyeo (안성녀; 1881 – 1954)
- Brother
  - Younger brother: An Jeong-geun (안정근; 安定根; 17 January 1887 – 17 March 1949)
    - Sister-in-law: Yi Jeong-seo (이정서)
      - Nephew: An Won-saeng (안원생)
      - Niece: An Mi-saeng (안미생)
      - Nephew: An Jin-saeng (안진생; 28 January 1916 – 24 December 1988)
        - Niece-in-law: Park Tae-jeong (박태정)
          - Grandniece: An Gi-su (안기수)
          - Grandniece: An Gi-ryeo (안기려)
  - Younger brother: An Gong-geun (안공근; 安恭根; 11 July 1889 – 30 May 1939)
    - Nephew: An Woo-saeng (안우생; 安偶生; 1907 – 1997)
    - Nephew: An Nak-saeng (안낙생; 安樂生; 22 June 1913 – 1950)
    - Niece: Lady An
      - Nephew-in-law: Han Ji-seong (한지성; 韓志成)
    - Niece: Lady An
- Wife
  - Kim Ah-ryeo (김아려; 金亞麗)
- Children
  - Daughter: An Hyeon-saeng (안현생; 1902 – 1959)
    - Son-in-law: Hwang Il-cheong (황일청)
      - Granddaughter: Hwang Eun-ju (황은주)
      - Granddaughter: Hwang Eun-sil (황은실)
  - Son: An Mun-saeng (안문생; 安文生; 1903/04 (Note: died in 1916, age 12) – 1916)
  - Son: An Jun-saeng (안준생; 安俊生; 1907 – November 1951)
    - Daughter-in-law: Jeong Ok-nyeo (정옥녀; 鄭玉女; 1905 – ?)
      - Grandson: An Ung-ho (안웅호; 雄浩)
      - Granddaughter: An Seon-ho (안선호; ? – 2003)
      - Granddaughter: An Yeon-ho (안연호; Margaret Ahn; 4/11/1937 (Shanghai, China) - 2/5/2011 (Seattle, Washington) - final resting place: Mount Vernon Memorial Park, Garden of Memories, Row 1, Space 20)
- Cousins
  - An Myeong-geun (안명근,安明根; 1879 – 1927)
  - An Hong-geun (안홍근)
  - An Bong-geun (안봉근; 安奉根)
- Grandnephew: An Chun-saeng (안춘생; 安椿生; 12 August 1912 – 26 January 2011)

== Biography ==
=== Early life ===
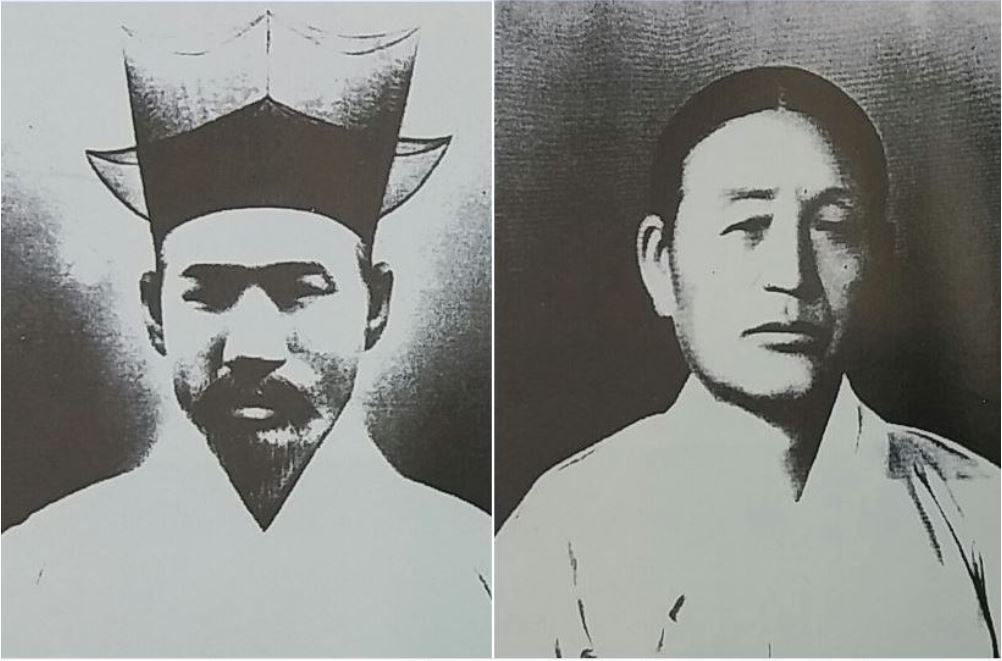
An's parents

An was born on 2 September 1879, in Haeju, Hwanghae Province, Joseon. He was the first son of An Taehun and Jo Maria, of the Sunheung An clan (순흥 안씨; 順興 安氏). Ahn is the 26th great-grandson of Ahn Hyang. His courtesy name was An Eungchil, originated from seven dots on the chest and stomach, meaning that it was born in accordance with the energy of the Big Dipper. As a boy, he learned Chinese literature and Western sciences, but was more interested in martial arts and marksmanship. Kim Ku, a future leader of the Korean independence movement who had taken refuge in An Tae-hun's house at the time, wrote that young An Jung-geun was an excellent marksman, liked to read books, and had strong charisma.

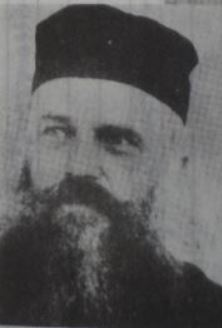
Father Wilhelm

At the age of 16, An entered the Catholic Church with his father, where he received his baptismal name, Thomas (토마스), and learned French. While fleeing from the Japanese, An took refuge with a French priest in Korea, Father Wilhelm (토마스; 洪錫九), who baptized him and hid him in his church for several months. Wilhelm encouraged An to read the Bible and had a series of discussions with him. He maintained his belief in Catholicism until his death, going to the point of even asking his son to become a priest in his last letter to his wife.

At the age of 25, he started a coal business, but devoted himself to the education of Korean people after the Eulsa Treaty by establishing private schools in northwestern regions of Korea. He also participated in the National Debt Repayment Movement, but found himself increasingly at odds with Church authorities because of his independence activism as they wanted the Catholic Church to be apolitical. This led to An being refused communion before he exiled himself in 1907 to Vladivostok to join in the armed resistance against the Japanese colonial rule. He was appointed a lieutenant general of an armed Korean resistance group and led several attacks against Japanese forces.

=== Assassination of Itō Hirobumi ===
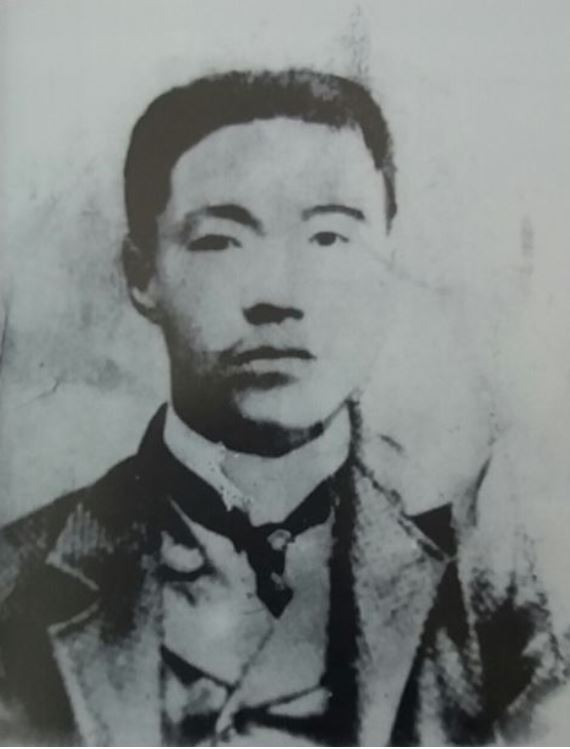
An in 1906

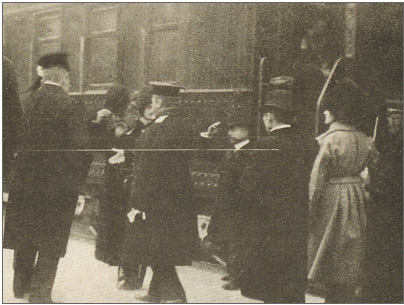
Itō Hirobumi (second on the left) before being gunned down by An

In October 1909, An passed himself off as a Japanese expat through the guards of the Harbin Railway Station, waiting at the Harbin Railway Station for Itō Hirobumi, the Japanese Resident-General of Korea back from negotiating with the Russian representative on the train.

An shot Itō three times with an FN M1900 pistol on the railway platform. To avoid misidentification, An also shot three men next to Itō: Kawagami Toshihiko (川上俊彦), the Japanese Consul General, Morita Jirō (森泰二郞), a Secretary of the Imperial Household Agency, and Tanaka Seitarō (田中淸太郞), an executive of the South Manchuria Railway. All were seriously injured. After the shooting, An yelled out for Korean independence in Russian, stating "Корея! Ура!" (Korea! Hurrah!).

An was arrested by Russian guards who held him for two days before turning him over to Japanese colonial authorities. When he heard the news that Itō had died, he reportedly made the sign of the cross in gratitude. An confirmed this at first under interrogation but later said he had done no such thing. It is not clear why he changed his statement but perhaps he was worried that his having done so would have hurt the Catholic Church.

=== Trial and execution ===
An's Japanese captors showed sympathy to him. According to An's autobiography, during his detention at Lüshun Russo-Japanese Prison, he was well treated and provided with ample food, delicacies, and other daily necessities. His calligraphy was highly admired and sought after by Japanese, most of which were later stored in Japan.

On 30 October 1909, the Japanese public prosecutor Mizobuchi Takao started his first interrogation of An. During the questioning, An recited Itō’s fifteen crimes as his motivation for the execution. Foremost among them, An accused Itō of having ordered the assassination of Empress Myeongseong—an act often attributed to Miura Gorō, who sent a report to Itō after the assassination. After hearing An’s account, Mizobuchi said: “Now that I have heard what you have said I can say that you are a righteous hero of the East. Such a person will certainly not be executed. So do not worry.” An responded, “I am not interested in discussing my life and death. Please quickly inform His Majesty the Emperor of what I have said. It is my hope that Itō’s evil policy can be rectified and the East rescued from its precarious position.”

"Itō Hirobumi's 15 crimes.

1. Assassinating the Korean Empress Myeongseong
2. Dethroning the Emperor Gojong
3. Forcing 14 unequal treaties on Korea
4. Massacring innocent Koreans
5. Usurping the authority of the Korean government by force
6. Plundering Korean railroads, mines, forests, and rivers
7. Forcing the use of Japanese banknotes
8. Disbanding the Korean armed forces
9. Obstructing the education of Koreans
10. Banning Koreans from studying abroad
11. Confiscating and burning Korean textbooks
12. Spreading a rumor around the world that Koreans wanted Japanese protection
13. Deceiving the Japanese Emperor by saying that the relationship between Korea and Japan was peaceful when in truth it was full of hostility and conflicts
14. Breaking the peace of Asia
15. Assassinating the Emperor Kōmei.

I, as a lieutenant general of the Korean resistance army, killed the criminal Itō Hirobumi because he disturbed the peace of the Orient and estranged the relationship between Korea and Japan. I hoped that if Korea and Japan be friendlier and are ruled peacefully, they would be a model all throughout the five continents. I did not kill Itō misunderstanding his intentions."

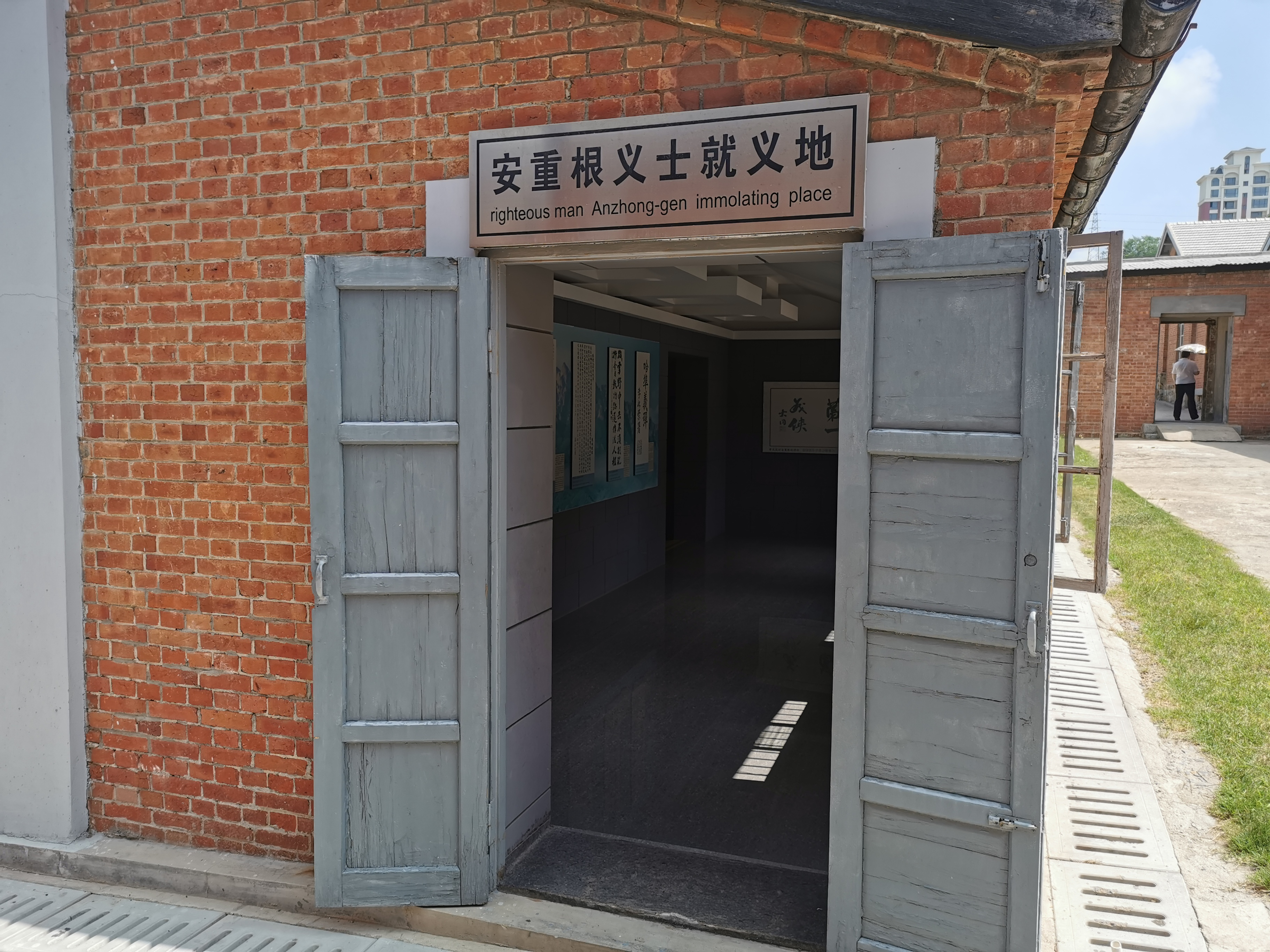
The place where An was executed, with signage in Chinese and Chinglish, Lüshun Russo-Japanese Prison, Dalian, China

Lawyers from Britain, Russia, and Korea, some retained by Korean communities abroad to assist An, sought permission from the Japanese colonial court in Lüshun to defend him, but their requests were rejected. The court instead appointed Japanese lawyers to represent him. In November 1909, before the trial, Japanese Foreign Minister Komura Jutarō ordered that An’s case be handled under Japanese criminal law. On 2 December 1909, Komura instructed the court to sentence An to death.

The court held six public hearings in February 1910, attended mainly by Japanese spectators, except for An’s two brothers and a lawyer from Korea. During the proceedings, An argued that he should be treated as a prisoner of war rather than an assassin, but the court rejected the claim.

An was sentenced to death on Feb 14, 1910. In the afternoon on the same day, An's two brothers Jeong-geun and Gong-geun met with him to deliver their mother's message, "Your death is for the sake of your country, and don't ask for your life in a cowardly manner. Your brave death for justice is final filial regard to your mother."

On 17 February 1910, An met with Hiraiwa Yoshito, president of the Japanese colonial Lüshun High Court, and expressed his intention to write A Treatise on Peace in the East as well as his decision not to appeal the case. Hiraishi assured him that he would have several months to complete the treatise before the execution. However, Tokyo later ordered that the sentence be carried out promptly, leaving An’s work unfinished.

During his imprisonment, An asked that Father Wilhelm come and visit him in prison but Bishop Mutel refused his request, apparently because he wanted Ahn to publicly repudiate his actions before he would send a priest. Father Wilhelm visited him anyway, arriving in Lushun on March 1, 1910, hearing his confession and giving him Holy Communion. Mutel later punished Wilhelm for his actions but Wilhelm appealed to the Vatican and was vindicated.

Before his execution, An received traditional Korean white clothes sent by his mother and asked to be executed as a prisoner of war by firing squad. Instead, he was hanged as a common criminal at the prison on 26 March 1910.

After An’s burial on the same day, Japanese officials held a banquet at the residence of Hiraiwa Yoshito to commend those involved in the case. Bonuses were awarded to officials who had participated in the case.

In his will, An dictated that his body be buried in Harbin Park in China and later moved to his homeland if Korea achieved independence. However, the location of his burial has never been found. According to available records, he was buried near the prison. The South Korean government has not received cooperation from the Japanese government regarding the burial site, and several joint South–North Korean and Chinese excavation efforts have failed to recover his remains. Hyochang Park in Seoul contains a grassy mound that serves as an honorary grave for An.

== Legacy ==
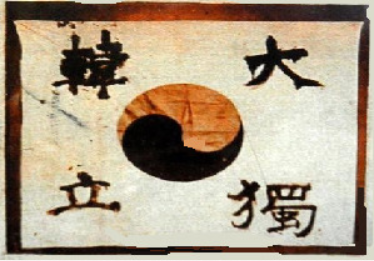
Taegukgi by An Jung-geun longing for the Independence of Korea

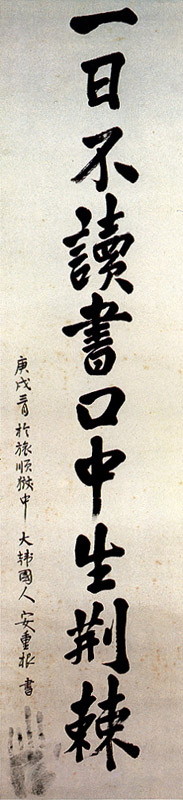
"一日不讀書口中生荊棘" means "Unless you read every day, thorns grow in the mouth."

=== Commemoration ===
In 1962, the South Korean government posthumously awarded An the Republic of Korea Medal, the highest grade of the Order of Merit for National Foundation, for his efforts toward Korean independence.

On 26 March 2010, a nationwide centenary tribute to An was held in South Korea, including a ceremony led by the Prime Minister Chung Un-Chan and tribute concerts.

The ITF Taekwon-Do pattern Joong-Gun was named after An.

=== Pan-Asianism ===
An strongly believed in the union of the three great countries in East Asia, China, Korea, and Japan in order to counter and fight off Western imperialism, namely, Western countries that controlled parts of Asia, and restore East Asian independence. He followed the progress of Japan during the Russo-Japanese War and claimed that he and his compatriots were delighted at hearing of the defeat of one of the agents of western imperialism, but were disappointed that the war ended before Russia was totally subjugated.

According to Donald Keene, author of Emperor of Japan: Meiji and His World, 1852–1912, An Jung-Geun was an admirer of Emperor Meiji of Imperial Japan. One of the 15 charges An leveled against Itō was that he had deceived the Emperor of Japan, whom An felt desired peace in East Asia and Korean independence. An requested that Meiji be informed of his reasons for his execution of Itō in the hopes that if Meiji understood his reasons, the emperor would realize how mistaken Itō's policies were and would rejoice. An also felt sure that most Japanese felt similar hatred for Itō, an opinion he formed from talking with Japanese prisoners in Korea. During An's prison sentence and trial, many Japanese prison guards, lawyers, and even prosecutors were inspired by him.

An felt that with the death of Itō, Japan and Korea could become friends because of the many traditions that they shared. He hoped that this friendship, along with China, would become a model for the world to follow. His thoughts on Pan-Asianism were stated in his essay, "A Treatise on Peace in the East," (東洋平和論; 동양평화론) that he worked on and left unfinished before his execution. In this work, An recommends the organization of combined armed forces and the issue of joint banknotes among Korea, Japan, and China. Sasagawa Norikatsu (笹川紀勝), a Professor of Law at Meiji University, highly praises An's idea as an equivalent of the European Union and a concept that preceded the concept of the League of Nations by 10 years.

=== Calligraphy ===
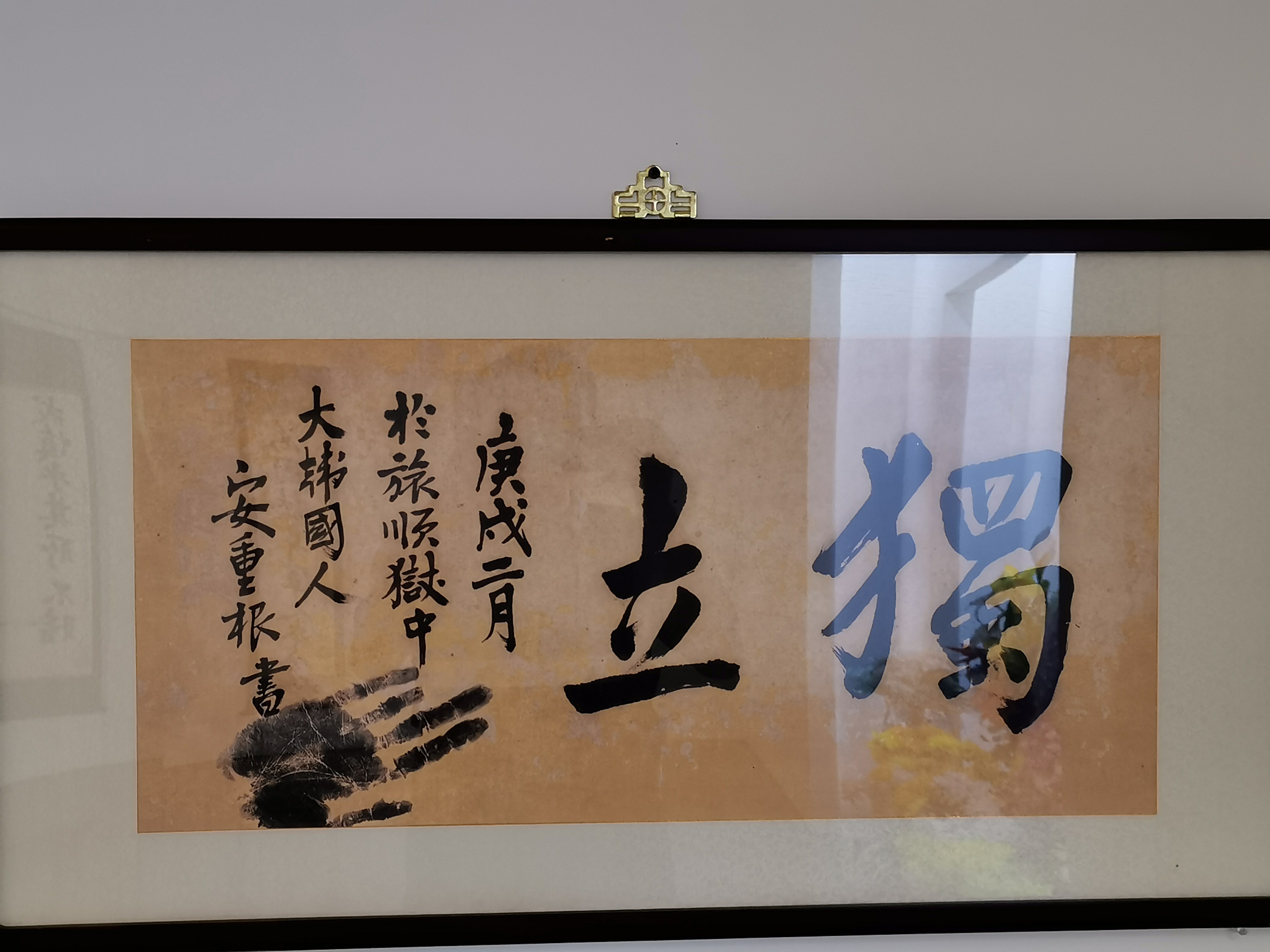
An's calligraphy: Independence (獨立)

An is highly renowned for calligraphy works. While he was in prison, many prison guards such as Chiba Toshichi (千葉十七) who respected him, made requests to An for calligraphy works. He left many calligraphy works which were written in the jail of Lushun although he hadn't studied calligraphy formally. He would leave on his calligraphy works a signature of "大韓國人" (Great Korean) and a handprint of his left hand, which was missing the last joint of the ring finger, which he had cut off with his comrades in 1909 as a pledge to kill Itō. Some of the works were designated as Treasure No. 569 of the Republic of Korea in 1972. One of his famous works is "一日不讀書口中生荆棘," (일일부독서 구중생형극; Unless one reads every day, thorns grow in the mouth); a variation on a well-known idiom from Dream of the Red Chamber ("Three days without practicing the piano led to my hands being as stiff as thorns"; 「三日不彈，手生荆棘」).

=== Memorial Halls ===
Memorial halls for An were erected in Seoul in 1970 by the South Korean government and in Harbin by the Chinese government in 2006. South Korean President Park Geun-Hye raised the idea of erecting a monument for An while meeting with General Secretary of the Chinese Communist Party Xi Jinping in China in June 2013. Thus, another memorial hall at the Harbin Railway Station, where the assassination occurred, was opened on Sunday, 19 January 2014 in Harbin. The hall, a 200-square meter room, features photos and memorabilia. Annual activities in memorial of An are held in Lüshun, where he was imprisoned and executed.

== Political Thought ==
=== Eastern Peace Theory ===
While imprisoned, An Jung-geun attempted to write The Theory of Eastern Peace (Dongyang Pyeonghwa-ron). He sought the right to appeal in order to complete the treatise and intended to finish writing it during the period granted for the appeal. The presiding judge of the High Court promised to postpone the execution of the death sentence for several months until the treatise was completed, so An Jung-geun withdrew his appeal. However, the promise was not kept, and he was executed, leaving The Theory of Eastern Peace unfinished.

In The Theory of Eastern Peace, An Jung-geun viewed the world of his time as an era of “the survival of the fittest” and criticized the aggressive international order established by the Western powers. He believed that Japan had undermined peace in East Asia by invading Korea after failing to honor its promises of “peace in the East” and “Korean independence” made during the Russo-Japanese War. An Jung-geun criticized Japan for attacking a neighboring country of the same race and severing friendly relations at a time when Western powers were expanding into East Asia. In short, although cooperation among the three East Asian countries was the best way to counter Western aggression, Japan attacked a country of the same race despite recognizing this necessity. He argued that this was tantamount to Japan becoming an instrument of the West and invading the East on its behalf.

An Jung-geun argued that, to achieve peace in East Asia, Japan should first restore Korea's national sovereignty and abandon its aggression against Manchuria and Qing China. He believed that an independent Korea, Qing China, and Japan should then cooperate to prevent Western aggression and achieve peace in East Asia, and ultimately world peace, through mutual harmony and enlightenment. He emphasized the reality that the international situation of the time was divided between East and West, making it difficult for the three East Asian countries to survive unless they stood together in solidarity.

In a record of his prison interrogation with Japanese officials, An Jung-geun proposed concrete policies for achieving peace in East Asia. He advocated establishing an “East Asian Peace Conference” in Lüshun to coordinate the positions of Japan, Qing China, and Korea; integrating their economies through a common currency; and organizing a joint military force among the three countries to prepare for Western aggression. He also proposed having young people from the three countries learn one another's languages in order to foster mutual understanding and a sense of brotherhood.

An Jung-geun argued that Korea and Qing China should develop their commerce and industry under the leadership of Japan, which had taken the lead in modernization, and become modern states through economic development and cooperation. He also believed that the emperors of the three countries should visit the Pope in Rome and receive imperial crowns together, thereby gaining international recognition through a world religion and ensuring lasting peace in East Asia. This concept of a kind of “Northeast Asian Union” was intended to expand into an “Asian Union,” with countries such as India, Thailand, Vietnam, and Myanmar joining after the three countries had set an example.

==== Evaluations of the Theory of Eastern Peace ====
Eiji Makino evaluates An Jung-geun's basic principles and strategies for peace as offering significant insights into the circumstances and security challenges facing East Asia in the 21st century, as discussed below. In particular, he points out that the peoples of Japan, China, and South Korea today should make an effort to actively heed An's argument that solidarity among the three countries, based on mutual trust, is necessary. He also regards proposals such as the establishment of a “neutral zone,” the introduction of bilingual education, the development of a peacekeeping force, and the issuance of a common currency as concrete and highly realistic proposals for “peace,” noting that some of these policies have already been implemented by the European Union.

Modern historian Hiroyuki Ogawara finds the historical significance of An Jung-geun's thought in its overcoming of the aporia of the Patriotic Enlightenment Movement, which developed from a modernist perspective that made it difficult to criticize imperialist realities following the acceptance of social Darwinism. However, he also argues that The Theory of Eastern Peace was grounded in Confucian civilizationalism, taking morality as the standard of value and making the preservation of each country's “independence and sovereignty” its central principle. According to Ogawara, this was made possible by an optimistic view of civilization that maintained pride in Korea as a small country while holding that even great powers could be called upon to uphold moral principles.

Kim Kyung-il of the Academy of Korean Studies considers the concrete measures proposed in The Theory of Eastern Peace to have emerged not so much from An Jung-geun's individual originality as from a process of critically examining, supplementing, and adopting proposals discussed among East Asian intellectuals and in the media of the time, making them a shared intellectual legacy. However, An reinterpreted and further developed these ideas, transforming them into his own distinctive theory of peace. In particular, Kim regards An's systematic discussion of the theory during his imprisonment, through meetings with Presiding Judge Hirai, as evidence of his efforts and passion in pursuing East Asian peace and Korean independence as lifelong goals. Kim concludes that An's efforts and attempts to systematize the theory cannot be overestimated, no matter how highly they are valued.

=== On Civil Rights ===
An Jung-geun's political thought aimed at building a modern nation-state through the establishment of civil rights. He regarded the state not as the country of a select group of high-ranking officials, but as the country of its people. Declaring, “If there are no people, where is the country?”, he expressed the view that sovereignty resides in the people and that they should be the masters of the state. He also believed that people could obtain civil rights and freedom only by fulfilling their duties, and regarded the restoration of national sovereignty as a duty of the people. Furthermore, he sought to reform a government that oppressed and exploited the people through the establishment of civil rights and freedom, and to build a dignified, civilized, and independent nation.

Guided by these ideas, An Jung-geun engaged in educational and industrial development movements, emphasizing education and national unity in the righteous army movement as well. He stated, “Anyone who does not think of Korea as a Korean is a traitor to the nation,” emphasizing that the people bore responsibility for restoring national sovereignty. This conviction also shaped his independence movement. He characterized the Assassination of Itō Hirobumi as an act carried out as a “representative of more than twenty million Korean compatriots” and testified in court that he had fulfilled his duty as a citizen. His ideas on civil rights linked national independence with the rights of the people and aimed at establishing a modern nation-state in which the people would be sovereign.

=== On Monarchy ===
An Jung-geun's vision of building a modern nation-state based on the establishment of civil rights led him to criticize absolute monarchy. During his trial, he stated that Korea's failure to defend its independence despite having made progress was a consequence of the monarchical system, and questioned whether responsibility lay with those at the top or those below. In this way, he attributed responsibility for the loss of national sovereignty to both the monarch and the people, pointing out the limitations of monarchy.

=== On Japanese Policy ===
An Jung-geun believed that, to establish its hegemony, Japan needed to accomplish something that the great powers had not yet achieved. Simply imitating the methods employed by foreign countries and defeating and annexing weaker nations would not be sufficient. He argued that although Japan was developing rapidly enough to stand alongside the great powers as a first-rate nation, its weakness lay in having achieved its progress through “rapid and decisive action.” An Jung-geun also considered the improvement of Japan's fiscal health an urgent priority.

An Jung-geun also believed that Japan needed to earn the trust of the great powers, but argued that Itō Hirobumi's policies had caused Japan to lose the world's confidence. He considered it a mistake that the Japan–Korea Treaty of 1905 had not won the sincere submission of the Korean people to Japan, but had instead intensified their resistance, yielding no benefits for Japan either. He stated that Japan, Qing China, and Korea were brotherly nations that had maintained close relations in the past, yet had reached a point where their mutual hostility was being displayed to the world.

=== On Imperialism ===
Because An Jung-geun regarded the modernization and civilization of Korea as the foremost priority, he placed great expectations on Japan, which had achieved modernization earlier. At the outbreak of the Russo-Japanese War, An stated, “More than twenty million of my compatriots were all delighted to be Japanese people.” He also remarked, “If Lord Itō's administration had been properly conducted, the Korean people would have assimilated into the Japanese people without even realizing it.” Since he did not reject Japanese protectorate rule outright, he is considered to have internalized aspects of imperialist ideology himself. However, through his experience in the righteous army struggle, he came to align himself with Choe Ik-hyeon, who advocated solidarity among Japan, Korea, and China, and eventually called on Japan to return to the principles of good faith and honor that it ought to uphold.

An Jung-geun first clearly defined civilization as a condition in which people of all ages and genders could live peacefully by following “morality” and preserving their “innate nature.” However, under modern civilization founded on the “theory of competition,” namely social Darwinism, wars continued unabated, and violence was perpetrated daily in the name of civilization. After sharply criticizing this imperialist reality from the standpoint of the theory of natural human rights, An Jung-geun called for a return to “morality.” Through this appeal, he established a position from which to criticize modern civilization and sought to pursue a thoroughgoing critique of imperialism on that basis. This line of imperialism criticism represented an intellectual shift that broke through the impasse of the Patriotic Enlightenment Movement, which remained trapped within the logic of social Darwinism at a time when imperialism had reached its zenith.

== Controversies ==
The legacy of An is divisive. The Japanese government regards An as a criminal and terrorist, while the South Korean government honors him as a national hero. In North Korea, official attitudes toward An were initially ambivalent because of his yangban aristocratic background, but his status has been increasingly elevated under Kim Jong Un.

China, across successive regimes, has generally regarded An with admiration. At the time of the assassination, Harbin was under Russian control as the center of the Chinese Eastern Railway, constructed under the Li–Lobanov Treaty. In order to avoid damaging relations with Japan, both the Qing government and Russia allowed Japanese authorities to exercise jurisdiction over the trial. Nevertheless, Chinese political figures such as Yuan Shikai, the last Qing governor of Korea before Itō, as well as Sun Yat-sen and Liang Qichao, publicly praised An. The Republic of China, which supported Korean independence movements, regarded An as a martyr. In the early years of the People’s Republic of China, his story appeared in primary school textbooks, though it later received less attention in official propaganda.

Some scholars have argued that An’s assassination accelerated Japan’s annexation of Korea. In 2009, Itō Yukio, history professor at Kyoto University and a leading expert on Itō Hirobumi, argued that An was a "righteous and sincere man" whose assassination of Hirobumi was a strategic disaster for Korean independence, largely stemming from An's political misunderstanding. Yukio pointed out that Hirobumi favored a "protectorate" model where Korea remained a separate entity. By killing the most powerful moderate voice in Japan, An inadvertently cleared the path for the hardline military faction, led by Yamagata Aritomo, to push through the total annexation of Korea in 1910.

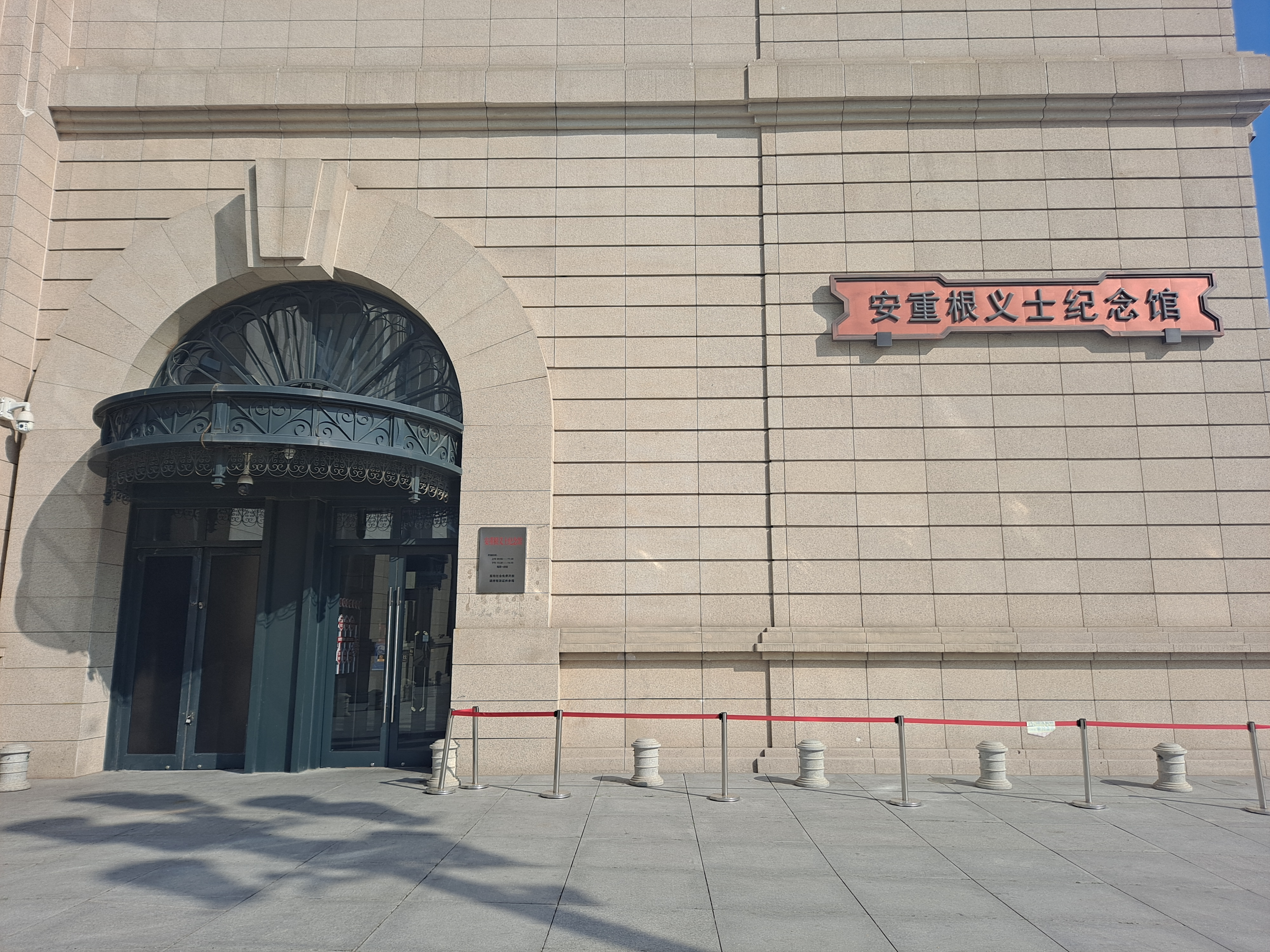
An Jung-geun Memorial Hall, Harbin

In China, An’s story has been selectively revived after being largely neglected for half a century. In 2014, amid tensions with Japan over the Diaoyu/Senkaku Islands dispute, China opened a memorial hall for An at Harbin Railway Station following South Korea's suggestion, prompting protests from Japan. Yoshihide Suga, then the Japanese Chief Cabinet Secretary and later Prime Minister, stated that the memorial was “not conducive to building peace and stability” in East Asia. In early 2017, the memorial hall was relocated to a museum in Harbin following South Korea’s deployment of the U.S. THAAD missile defense system, prompting concerns from South Korea, while China denied political motivations. It reopened at Harbin Railway Station after renovation and expansion in 2019.

A devout Catholic during his life, An was refused communion by the Catholic Church in Korea because of his political activism. During his imprisonment, he was excommunicated for the assassination. The excommunication was lifted in 1993.

In February 2017, South Korean police were criticized for using a picture of An in posters put up in the city of Incheon. The poster warned of terrorism, and many South Korean citizens online criticized the police, asking "if it was meant to imply if An was a terrorist". The police apologized and clarified that there was no intention to associate An with terrorism, and all posters were taken down.

== In popular culture ==
An's assassination has been depicted in several films, including the 1959 South Korean film King Gojong and Martyr An Jung-Geun, the 1979 North Korean film An Jung Gun Shoots Itō Hirobumi, the 2004 South Korean film Thomas An Jung-geun (토마스 안중근), the 2022 South Korean musical Hero, and the 2024 South Korean film Harbin.

In 2002, film 2009: Lost Memories science fiction action film. The film takes place in an alternate 2009, where the Korean Peninsula is still part of Imperial Japan due to a time-travel incident in 1909 to try to prevent An from killing Itō Hirobumi.

In 2014, Zhang Yimou was announced to direct a film, backed by the governments of China and South Korea, about An, with Kwon Sang-woo cast as An and Tony Leung Ka-fai as Itō Hirobumi; the project was ultimately abandoned.

An is represented by the characters Go Ae-shin and Eugene Choi in the 2018 South Korean Drama Mr. Sunshine (South Korean TV series).

A fictionalized explanation of the events is presented in an episode of the fifteenth season of Murdoch Mysteries, a Canadian murder mystery show, in 2022. In the episode, entitled Patriot Games, a dead body in a Toronto cellar leads to an explanation of An Jung-geun's assassination plot wherein rogue Russian agents play a part, requiring swift action to prevent the outbreak of a potential world war.

== See also ==
- Lee Bong-chang
- Yun Bong-gil
