= Yi County, Liaoning =

Yixian 义县
- County
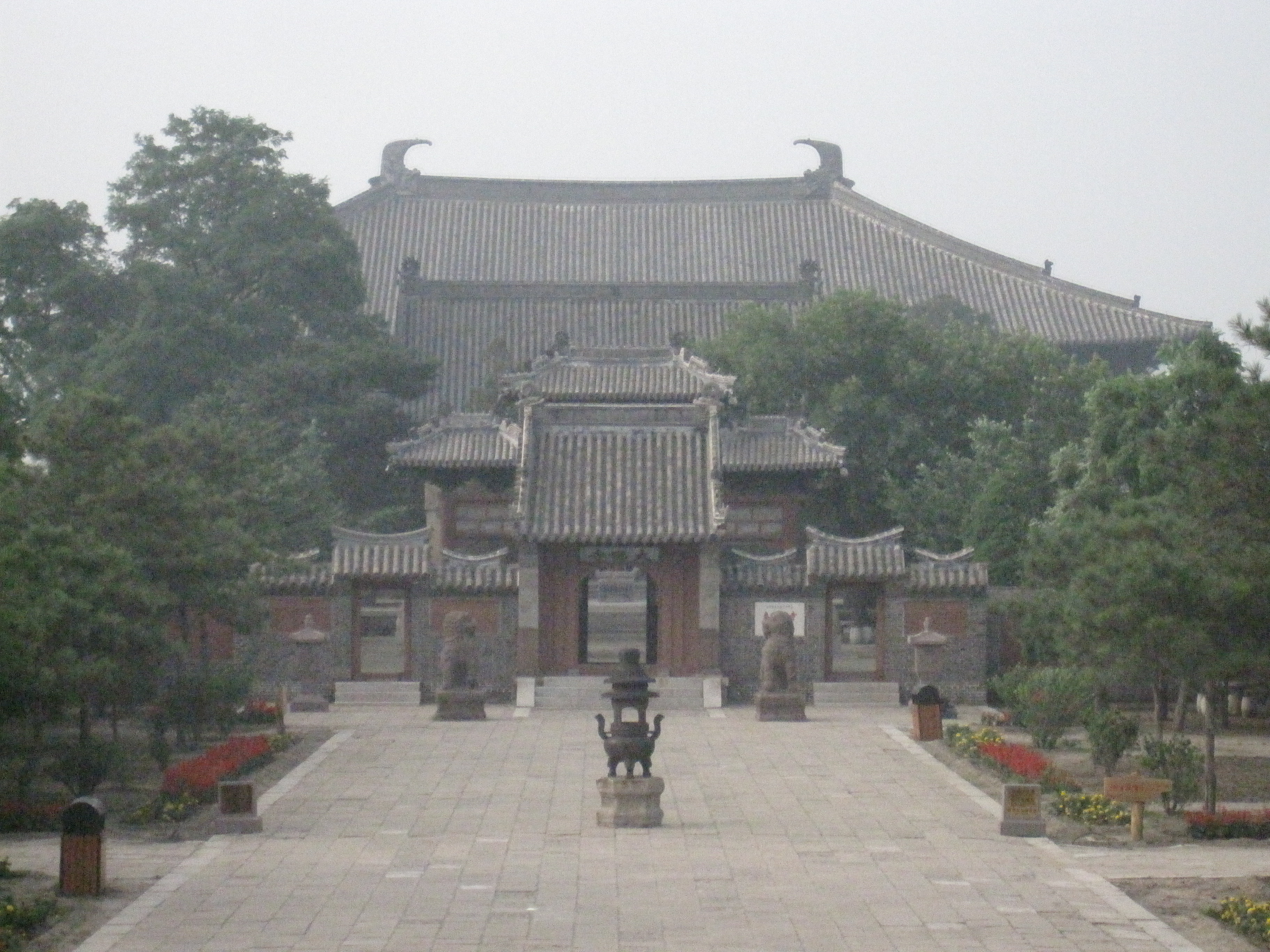
- Fengguo Temple

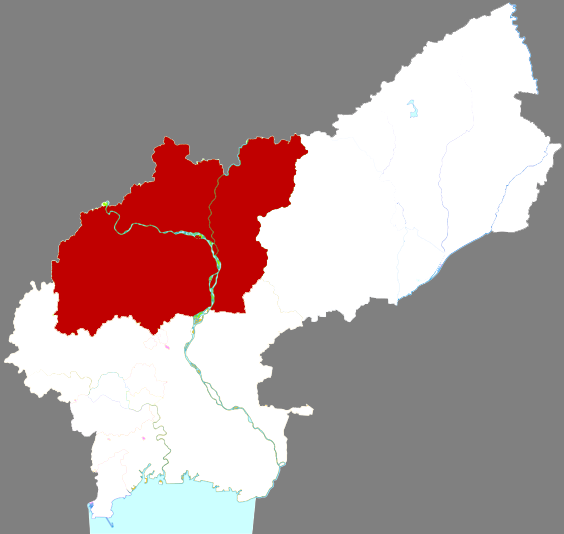
- Yi County in Jinzhou

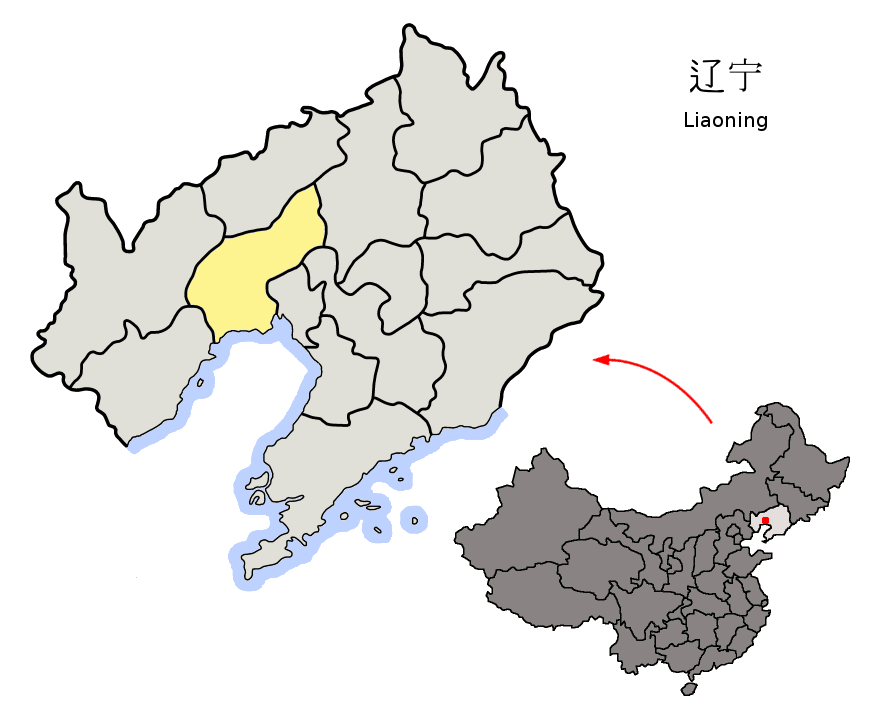
- Jinzhou in Liaoning
- Coordinates: 41°31′59″N 121°14′20″E
- Country: People's Republic of China
- Province: Liaoning
- Prefecture-level city: Jinzhou

Area
  - Total: 2,487 km^{2} (960 sq mi)

Population (2020 census)
  - Total: 305,996
  - Density: 123.0/km^{2} (318.7/sq mi)
- Time zone: UTC+8 (China Standard)

Yi County or Yixian (simplified Chinese: 义县; traditional Chinese: 義縣; pinyin: Yì Xiàn) is a county in west-central Liaoning Province, China, and is under the administration of the prefecture-level city of Jinzhou. Fengguo Temple, dating from 1020, is located in the county seat.

== Administrative divisions ==
There are seven towns, one township, and 10 ethnic townships in the county.

Towns:

- Yizhou (义州镇), Qilihe (七里河镇), Jiudaoling (九道岭镇), Dayushubao (大榆树堡镇), Liulongtai (刘龙台镇), Gaotaizi (高台子镇), Shaohuyingzi (稍户营子镇)

Townships:

- Baimiaozi Township (白庙子乡), Toutai Manchu Ethnic Township (头台满族乡), Zhangjiabao Township (张家堡乡), Qianyang Township (前杨乡), Dadingbao Manchu Ethnic Township (大定堡满族乡), Waziyu Manchu Ethnic Township (瓦子峪满族乡), Toudaohe Manchu Ethnic Township (头道河满族乡), Dicangsi Manchu Ethnic Township (地藏寺满族乡), Chengguan Manchu Ethnic Township (城关满族乡), Liulonggou Manchu Ethnic Township (留龙沟满族乡), Juliangtun Manchu Ethnic Township (聚粮屯满族乡)

== Climate ==
Climate data for Yixian, elevation 74 m (243 ft), (1991–2020 normals, extremes 1991–present)
Month	Jan	Feb	Mar	Apr	May	Jun	Jul	Aug	Sep	Oct	Nov	Dec	Year
Record high °C (°F)	10.1 (50.2)	18.8 (65.8)	27.1 (80.8)	36.5 (97.7)	37.6 (99.7)	41.3 (106.3)	41.6 (106.9)	38.6 (101.5)	36.2 (97.2)	29.7 (85.5)	21.9 (71.4)	12.4 (54.3)	41.6 (106.9)
Mean daily maximum °C (°F)	−2.4 (27.7)	2.0 (35.6)	9.1 (48.4)	17.8 (64.0)	24.7 (76.5)	27.8 (82.0)	29.4 (84.9)	29.1 (84.4)	25.3 (77.5)	17.5 (63.5)	7.0 (44.6)	−0.7 (30.7)	15.6 (60.0)
Daily mean °C (°F)	−9.6 (14.7)	−5.3 (22.5)	2.0 (35.6)	10.7 (51.3)	17.9 (64.2)	22.0 (71.6)	24.5 (76.1)	23.6 (74.5)	18.1 (64.6)	10.1 (50.2)	0.3 (32.5)	−7.4 (18.7)	8.9 (48.0)
Mean daily minimum °C (°F)	−15.5 (4.1)	−11.4 (11.5)	−4.3 (24.3)	3.9 (39.0)	11.3 (52.3)	16.6 (61.9)	20.3 (68.5)	19.0 (66.2)	12.0 (53.6)	3.8 (38.8)	−5.2 (22.6)	−12.8 (9.0)	3.1 (37.7)
Record low °C (°F)	−30.6 (−23.1)	−25.6 (−14.1)	−18.6 (−1.5)	−7.1 (19.2)	−0.4 (31.3)	7.7 (45.9)	12.0 (53.6)	6.8 (44.2)	0.0 (32.0)	−7.8 (18.0)	−20.3 (−4.5)	−28.5 (−19.3)	−30.6 (−23.1)
Average precipitation mm (inches)	2.2 (0.09)	2.5 (0.10)	6.8 (0.27)	21.9 (0.86)	44.9 (1.77)	98.8 (3.89)	125.7 (4.95)	121.0 (4.76)	37.5 (1.48)	25.2 (0.99)	12.6 (0.50)	2.4 (0.09)	501.5 (19.75)
Average precipitation days (≥ 0.1 mm)	1.7	1.8	2.3	4.6	7.0	10.8	10.2	8.9	5.8	4.7	3.0	1.8	62.6
Average snowy days	2.3	2.4	2.2	0.7	0	0	0	0	0	0.2	2.3	2.3	12.4
Average relative humidity (%)	52	47	44	46	52	68	79	80	70	61	56	55	59
Mean monthly sunshine hours	206.3	205.6	243.2	241.2	263.2	223.6	205.5	227.7	238.8	226.7	187.7	187.1	2,656.6
Percentage possible sunshine	69	68	65	60	58	49	45	54	65	67	64	66	61
Source: China Meteorological AdministrationAll-time May Record

== See also ==
- Yixian Formation
