= Guangji Temple (Tianjin) =

Buddhist temple in Tianjin, China

- 广济寺
- Location within Tianjin

Religion
- Affiliation: Buddhism
- Deity: Chan Buddhism

Location
- Location: Baodi District, Tianjin
- Country: China
- Interactive map of Guangji Temple
- Coordinates: 39°43′59″N 117°18′42″E

Architecture
- Style: Chinese architecture
- Founder: Hongyan
- Established: 1005
- Completed: 2007 (reconstruction)

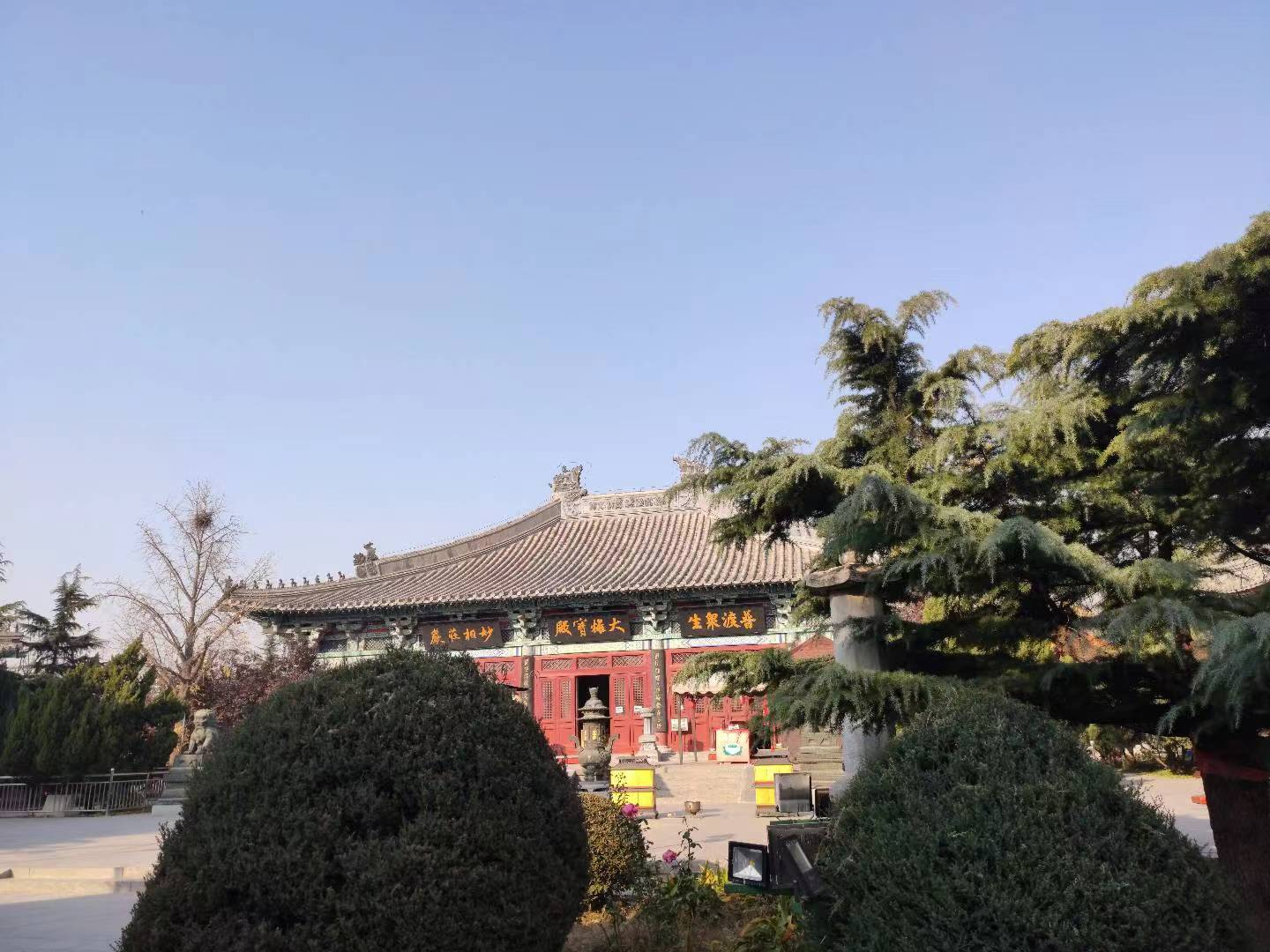

Guangji Temple (simplified Chinese: 广济寺; traditional Chinese: 廣濟寺; pinyin: Guǎngjì Sì) is a Buddhist temple located in Baodi District of Tianjin, China. Originally built in the Liao dynasty (907–1125), it is a cultural and artistic treasure in the Chinese architecture history. However, after the Communists seized the city, the magistrate presided over the destruction of the temple. The present version was completed in 2007, which was just the 1002 year after the original temple was built.

== History ==
According to the tablet inscription in the temple, Guangji Temple was first built by master Hongyan (弘演) in 1005, which was the Tonghe era (983–1012) of the reign of Emperor Shengzong of Liao dynasty (907–1125). After his death, his disciples Daoguang (道广) and Yihong (一弘) inherited the behest of their teacher, and the complex was finally completed in 1025.

In 1932, the eminent architect Liang Sicheng surveyed the temple, he made a detailed record of its buildings and took pictures, which was written into his book Architecture History in China.

In 1947, after the People's Liberation Army seized Tianjin, the than magistrate Yu Sheng (于生) ordered to demolish the temple and its wood were used to the Bailonggang Bridge (白龙港大桥), which was being built at that time.

In 2005, the local government started a reconstruction project with the original sample of Liao dynasty architectural style, which lasted for three year.

== Architecture ==
=== Hall of Three Bodhisattva ===
Constructed on a 0.2-metre (7.9 in) high pedestal, the hall is 24.5 metres (80 ft) long and 18 metres (59 ft) wide.

The Hall of Three Bodhisattva enshrines the three Bodhisattva, namely Guanyin, Manjusri and Samantabhadra. They are sitting on the lotus throne at the altar in the middle of the hall. Eight statues of Xieshi Bodhisattva (胁侍菩萨; Xieshi means Bodhisattva's warrior attendant) are placed in front of the statues of Three Bodhisattva. Six statues of Xieshi Bodhisattva and statues of Nryana (金刚力士) and Skanda are placed under the altar. The statues of Eighteen Arhats stand on both sides of the hall.
