= Guangji Temple (Hunan) =

Buddhist temple in Hengyang, China

- 广济寺
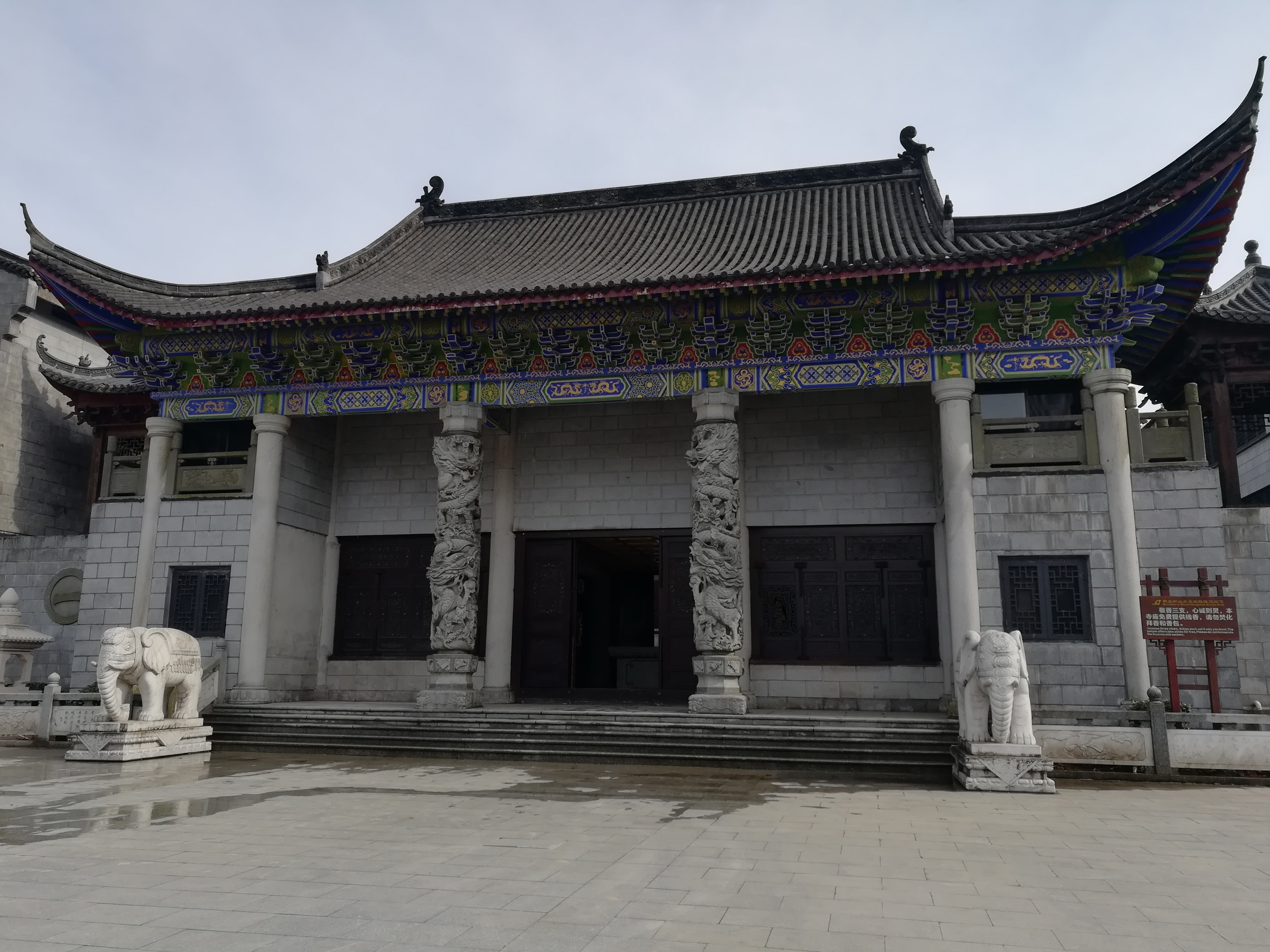
- The shanmen of Guangji Temple.

- Location within Hunan

Religion
- Affiliation: Buddhism
- District: Nanyue District
- Prefecture: Hengyang
- Province: Hunan
- Deity: Chan Buddhism
- Year consecrated: 1595

Location
- Country: China
- Interactive map of Guangji Temple
- Prefecture: Hengyang
- Coordinates: 27°18′07″N 112°42′59″E

Architecture
- Style: Chinese architecture
- Founder: Master Wu'ai

Guangji Temple (simplified Chinese: 广济寺; traditional Chinese: 廣濟寺; pinyin: Guǎngjì Sì) is a Buddhist temple located on the hillside of Mount Heng of Hengyang, Hunan, China.

== History ==
Guangji Temple was first established in 1595 by Master Wu'ai (无碍和尚), in the 23rd year of Wanli period of the Ming dynasty (1368-1644), and initially called Qingliang Temple (清凉寺). In the temple the statue of Vairocana was enshrined, Vairocana, also called 毗卢遮那佛; Pílúzhēnàfó in Chinese, so the temple also known as Pifodong (毗佛洞).

In 1658, master Zhu'an (竺庵和尚), the disciple of master Wu'ai, renovated the temple and renamed it "Guangji Temple". During the Kangxi period of Qing dynasty (1644-1911), masters Zhili (智犁和尚) and Longshan (龙山和尚), disciples of master Zhu'an, extended the temple.

== Gallery ==
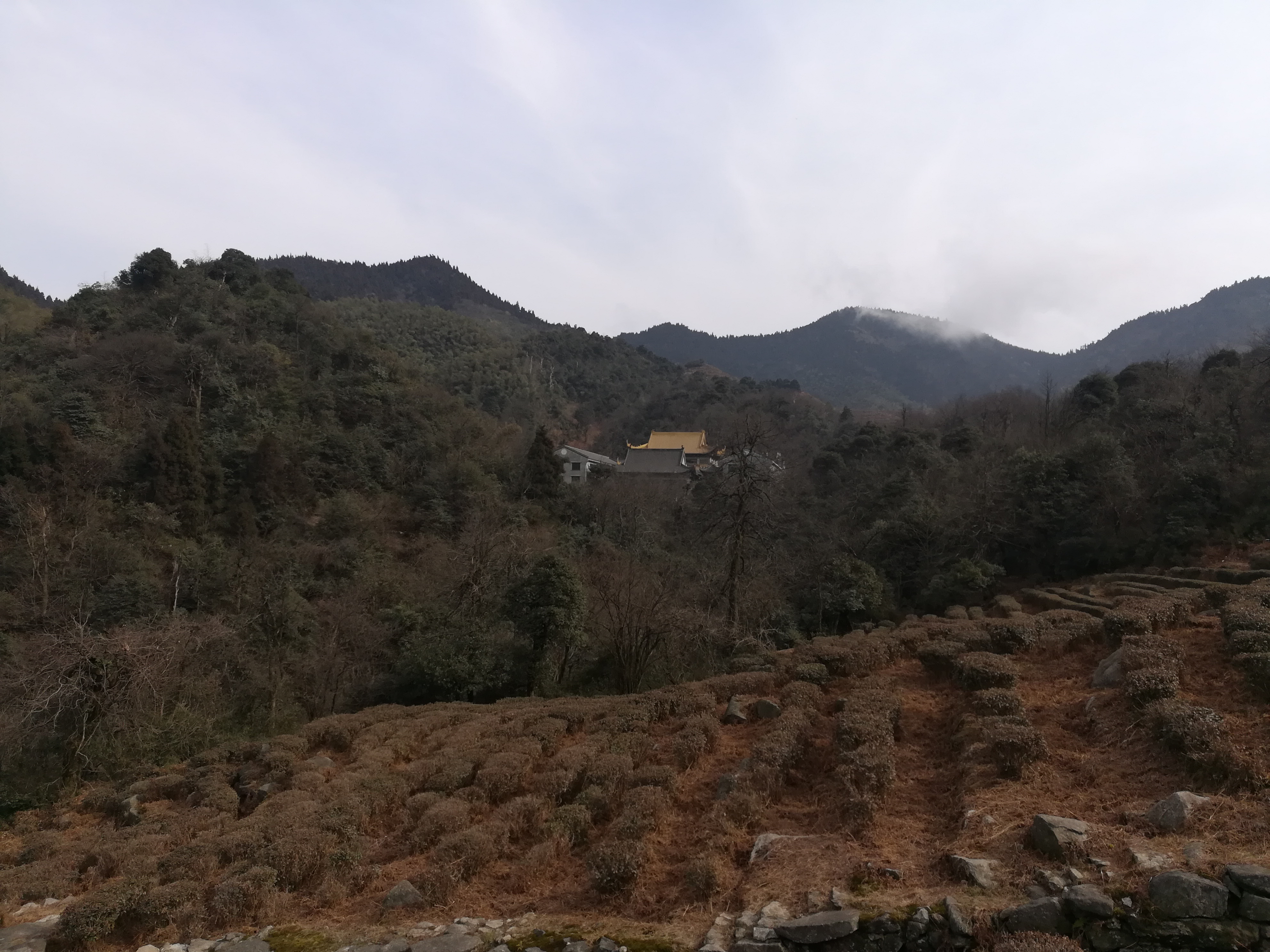
Distant view of Guangji Temple.

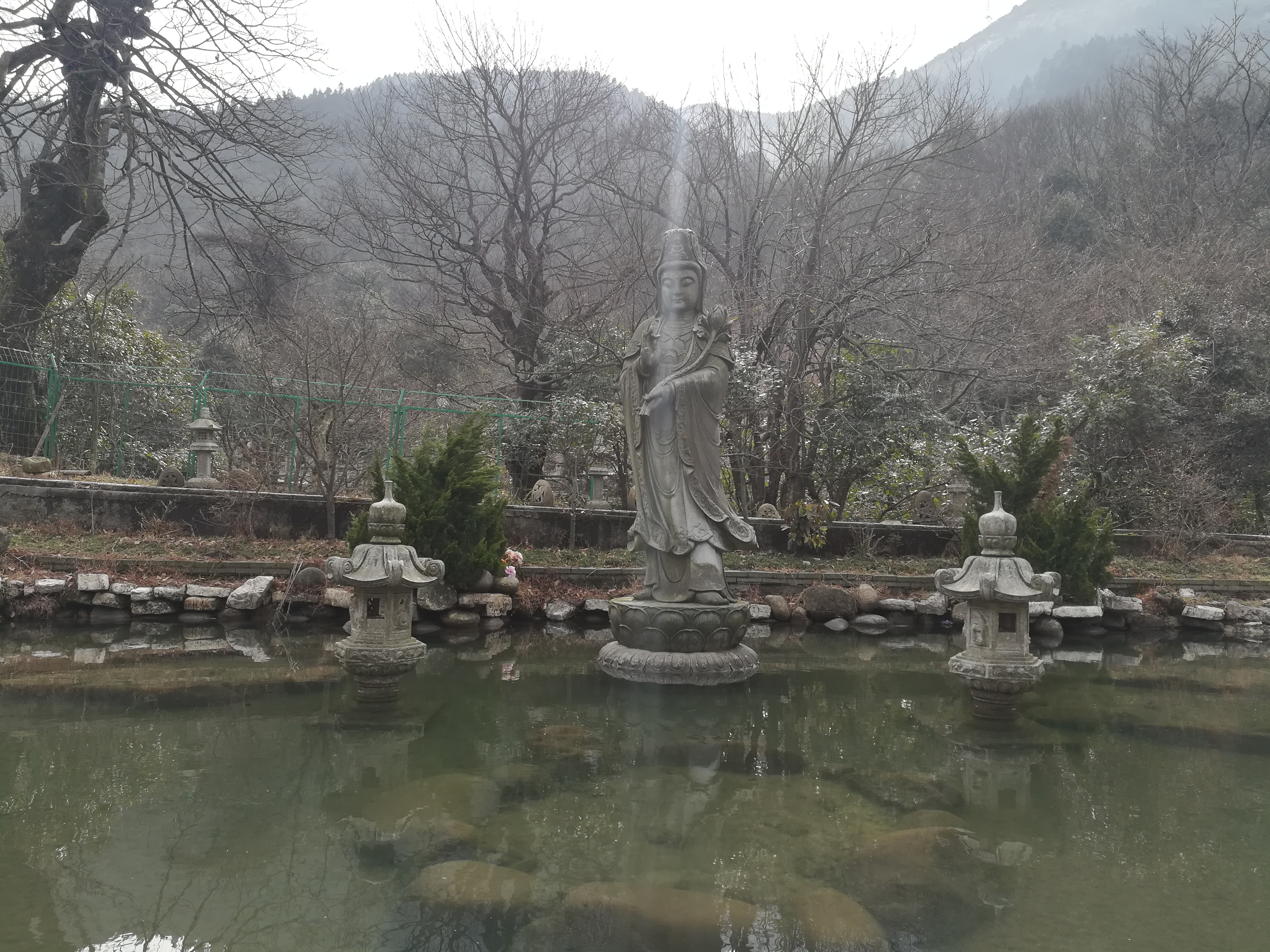
A statue of Guanyin stands on the Free Life Pond, Guangji Temple.

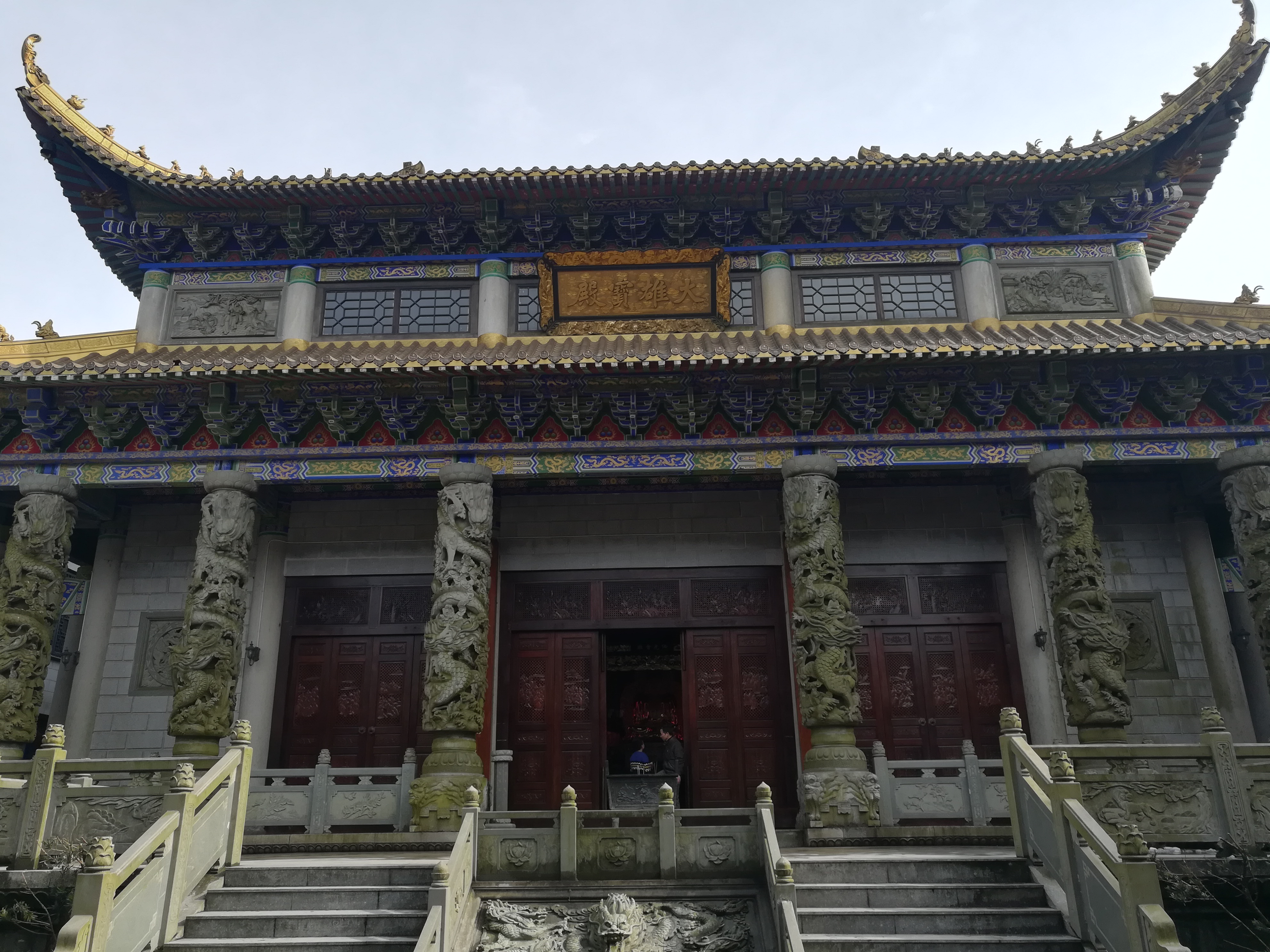
The Mahavira Hall at Guangji Temple.
