= Fengguo Temple =

Temple in Yixian, Liaoning Province, China

- 奉国寺
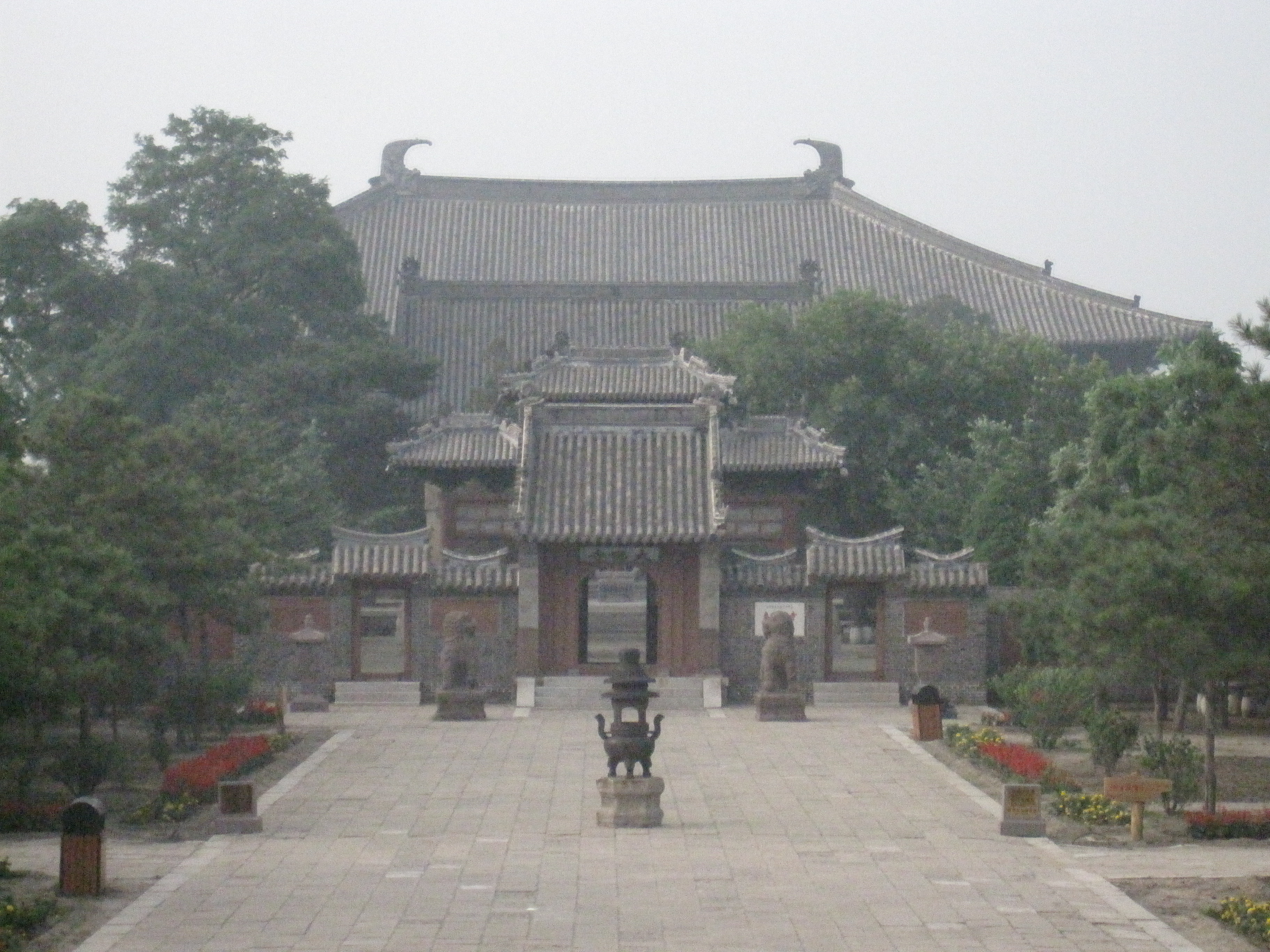
- The main axis of Fengguo Temple

- Location within Liaoning Location within China

Religion
- Affiliation: Buddhism

Location
- Location: Yixian, Liaoning
- Coordinates: 41°32′34″N 121°14′33″E

Architecture
- Style: Chinese architecture
- Established: 1020; Liao dynasty

Fengguo Temple
- Traditional Chinese: 奉國寺
- Simplified Chinese: 奉国寺
Transcriptions
Standard Mandarin
- Hanyu Pinyin: Fènggúo Sì

Fengguo Temple (Chinese: 奉国寺) is a Buddhist temple located in Yixian, Liaoning Province, China. The temple was first founded in 1020 during the Liao dynasty (916–1125), and grew quite large during the subsequent centuries. Today, only two halls, two gates, and a decorative arch survive. The most important surviving building is the Daxiongbao Hall, a very large hall that dates from 1020. The hall is notable for containing seven large Buddha sculptures, and other smaller sculptures, all dating from the Liao Dynasty. It has had several names over the centuries, including the "Xianxi Temple" (咸熙寺; Liao dynasty), "Seven Buddhas Temple" (七佛寺; Liaoning dynasty) and "Dafengguo Temple" (大奉国寺; Jin dynasty).

== History ==
Historical records about the history of Fengguo Temple are limited. Most of the history can only be ascertained from the twenty or so stele on the grounds of the temple. Replacing an earlier temple at the site called Xianxi Temple, Fengguo Temple was founded in 1020 by Jiao Xiyun, a retired scholar, and its construction was supervised by a monk called Qinghui. In 1107 a monk called Yizhuo worked at the monastery repairing and completing religious images. His work was completed in 1140 at the cost of 10 million cash. An earthquake severely damaged the temple in 1290, and a son-in-law of a Mongolian Khan donated money for repairs. The mid-14th-century temple is recorded as being quite large, featuring at least three pavilions, one in front of the Seven-Buddha hall and one on either side, a dharma hall, an “abstinence hall”, three different kitchen areas, monks quarters, a bathing chamber, a Ten Thousand Buddha hall and many other assorted buildings. Between 1487 and 1888 the hall was repaired at least seventeen times. The temple was most recently damaged in 1948 when it was bombed, and was only repaired again in the 1980s.

== Layout ==
Originally, Fengguo Temple had a Dharma Hall behind the Daxiongbao Hall, three pavilions in front, and a gate. One of the pavilions was located along the axis and two more faced each other inwards along the axis. Currently, only the Daxiongbao Hall survives from the temple's founding.

The present-day temple also has four other structures of note laid out on the north–south axis, all built during the Qing dynasty (1642–1912). Beginning in the south, there is an outer gate followed by an inner gate. Next, a decorated archway stands in front of the Wuliang Hall, a small three-bay hall that is directly in front of the Daxiongbao Hall.

=== Main Hall ===
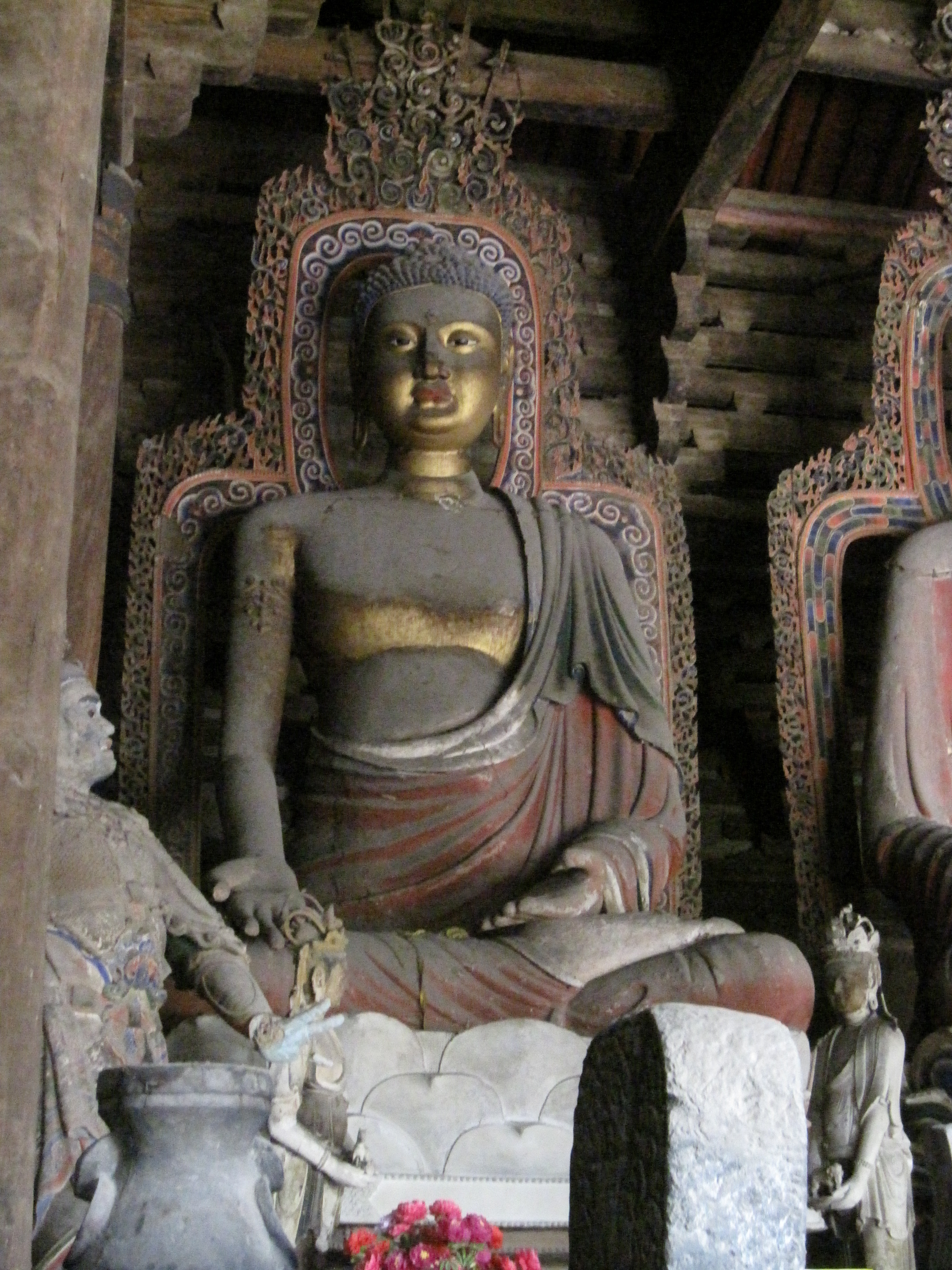
A statue of Vipashyin in the main hall

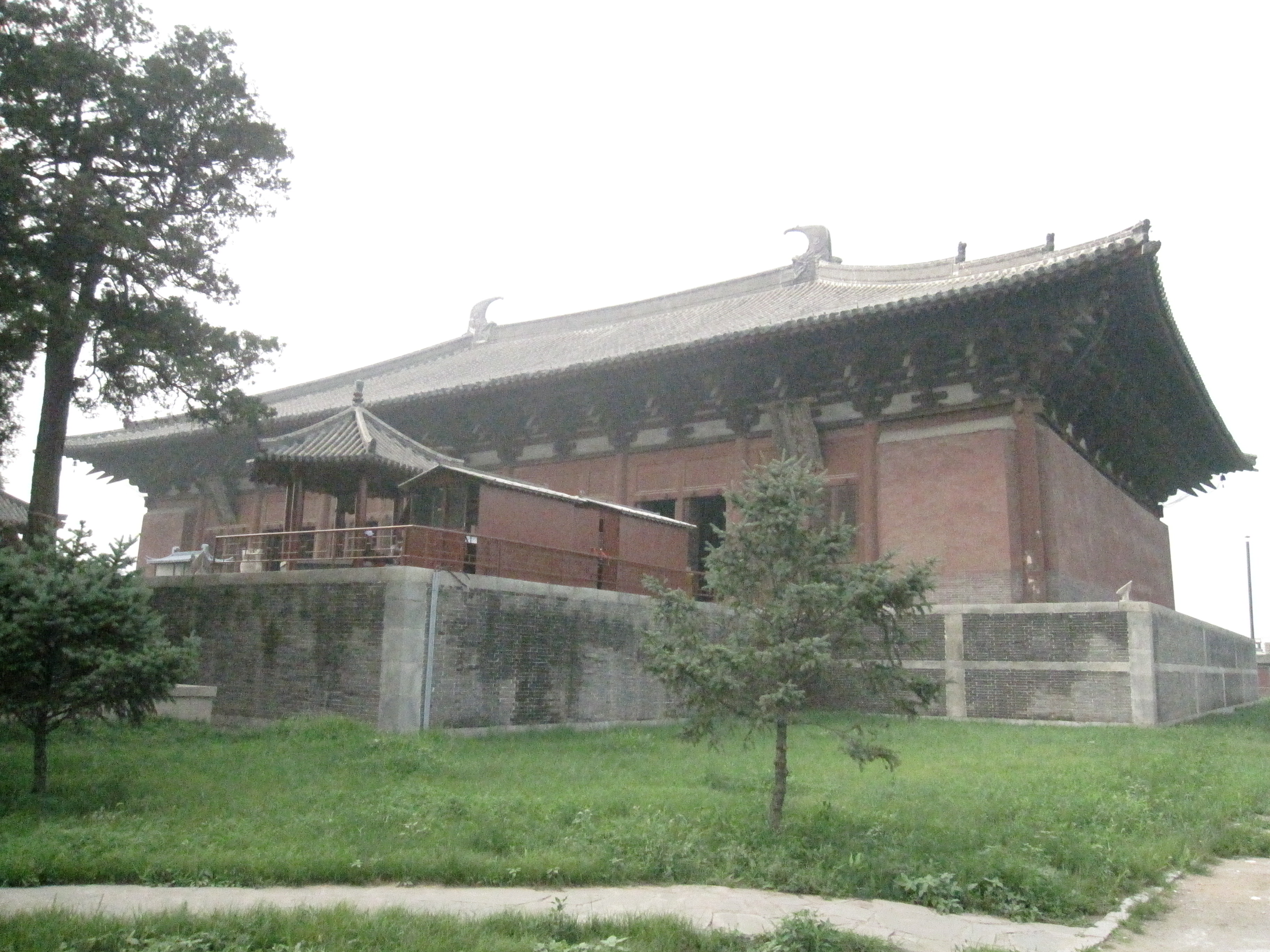
The Daxiongbao Hall

The Main or Daxiongbao Hall (大雄宝殿, Dàxíong Bǎodiàn) is very large for a Chinese timber hall, measuring nine by five bays. It faces south on a three-meter-high (9.8 ft) platform and measures 55.8 by 25.9 meters. In front of the three central bays extend a yuetai (stone platform) measuring 37 meters east to west and 15 meters north to south. Two structures dating from the Qing Dynasty stand on the yuetai: two kiosks and a stone incense burner. There is also a small yuetai at the back of the hall. Steinhardt suggests that this yuetai formerly served as a link to the no longer extant Dharma Hall.

The main hall contains seven large sculptures of Buddhas from past ages, a rare arrangement in Buddhist temples. The Buddhas are raised on an 87 cm high platform, with each of the seven inner bays holding one sculpture. In addition to Sakyamuni (the Buddha of the present age), the six other Buddhas represented are Vipashyin, Sikhin, Visvabhu, Krakucchanda, Kanakamuni and Kashyapa. Each of the seven Buddhas is flanked by two bodhisattvas, and a guardian king faces the south entry at each side of the altar. Behind the seven Buddhas, facing the back door, is a statue of Guanyin.

Only 20 interior pillars are used within the hall. There are four rows of columns in the hall, but an entire row (apart from the end pillars) has been eliminated in front of the Buddha statues, so as not to impede viewing. The bracket sets on the outside of the hall are all seventh rank, the highest. The main hall is the earliest Chinese building that uses bracket sets in between columns instead of just simple struts. The structure of the hall uses more than 30 types of timber pieces in between the column tops and the roof.

== The Present ==
In 2013, Fengguo Temple was placed on China's tentative list for UNESCO World Heritage Site consideration, along with the Pagoda of Fogong Temple.

Although Fengguo Temple is not explicitly mentioned by name, in Jung Chang's best-selling autobiography Wild Swans the author tells how her grandparents first met there, in a "casual" encounter arranged by her great-grandfather in 1924.
