= List of islands of North Korea =

Overview of North Korean islands

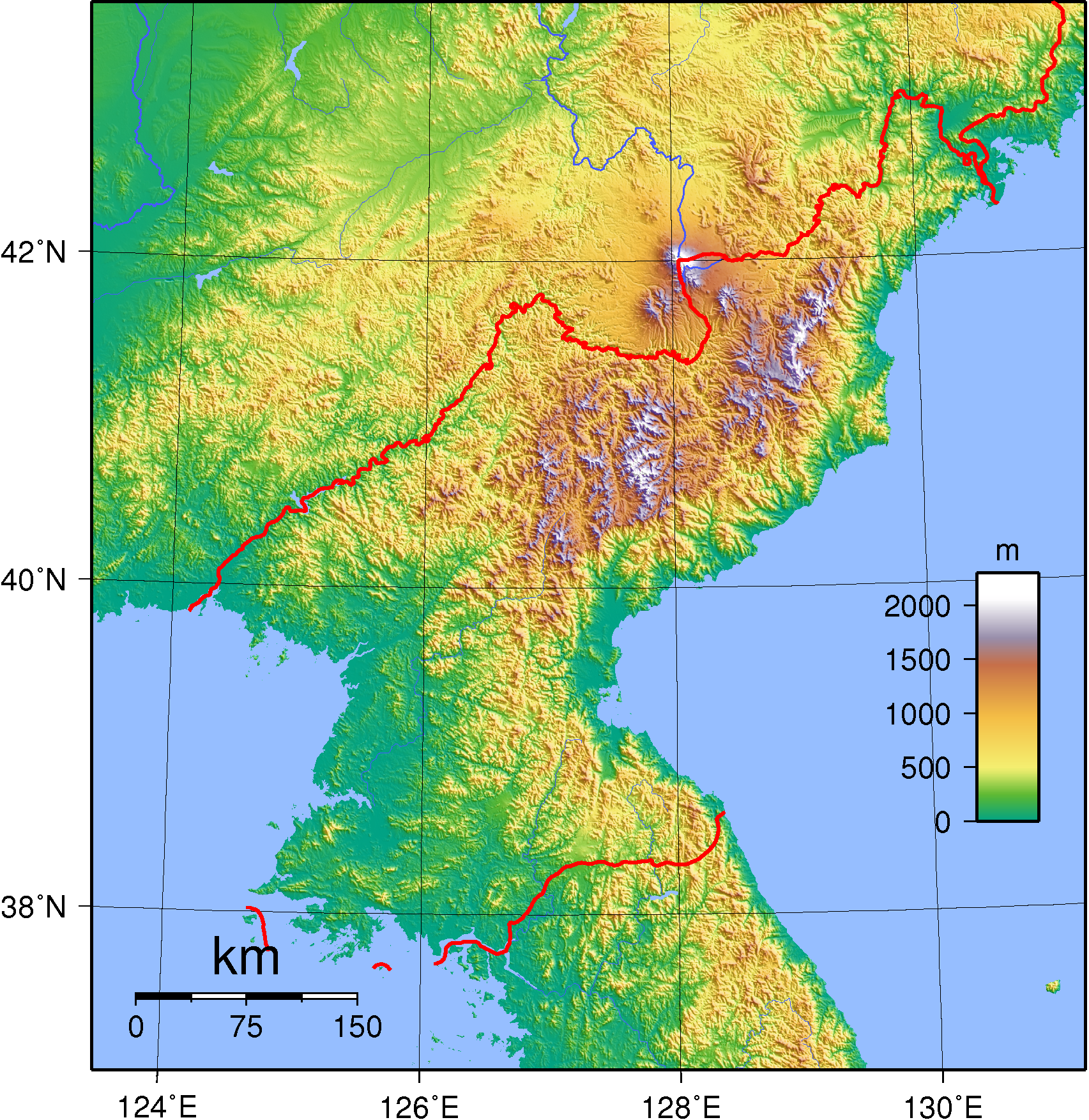

The following is a list of major islands of North Korea (Democratic People's Republic of Korea), arranged by province. For a list of islands in South Korea (Republic of Korea), see: List of islands of South Korea.

North Korea occupies the northern portion of the Korean Peninsula which extends about 1,000 kilometres (620 mi) southward from the northeast Asian continental landmass. The 8,460 kilometres (5,260 mi) coastline of Korea is highly irregular, and North Korea accounts for 2,495 kilometres (1,550 mi) of this, roughly one-third. To the west of North Korea are the Yellow Sea and Korea Bay, and to its east lies Japan across the Sea of Japan (East Sea of Korea). Most of the islands of North Korea are on its west coast.

According to the Constitution of the Republic of Korea, its territory consisting of "the Korean Peninsula and its adjacent islands," which in turn, all of the islands are wholly claimed by the ROK.

== Kangwon ==
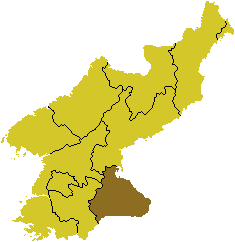

- Hwangt'odo (Hangul: 황토도 Revised Romanization: Hwangtodo; Hanja: 黃土島) (Jurisdiction: Anbyŏn County)
- Kukto (국도 Gukdo; 國島) (T'ongch'ŏn County)
- Samdo (삼도; 三島) (T'ongch'ŏn County)
- Sindo (신도; 薪島) (Wŏnsan City)
- Songdo (송도; 松島) (Kosŏng County)
- Yŏdo (여도 Yeodo; 麗島) (Wŏnsan City)

== North Hamgyong and Rason Special City ==
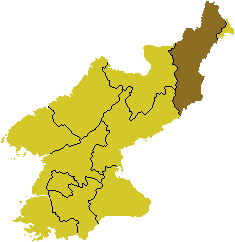

- Chŏkto (적도 Jeokdo; 赤島) (Kyŏnghŭng County)
- P'ido (피도Pido; 避島) (Kyŏnghŭng County)
- Nando (난도; 卵島) (Sŏnbong, Rason)
- Soch'odo (소초도 Sochodo; 小草島) (Rajin, Rason Special City)
- Ssangdo (쌍도; 雙島) (Rajin, Rason Special City)
- Taech'odo (대초도 Daechodo; 大草島) (Rajin, Rason Special City)
- Yangdo (양도; 洋島) (Kilju County)

=== Tumen River islands ===
- K'ŭnsŏm (큰섬 Keunseom) (Rason Special City)
- Maegido (매기도; 每基島) (Kyŏngwŏn County)
- Ryudado (류다도; 柳多島) (Kyŏngwŏn County)

== North Pyongan ==
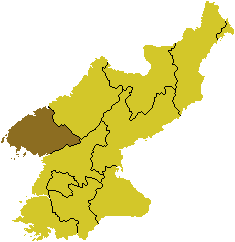

- Pansŏng Archipelago (Pansŏngnyŏldo; 반성렬도 [반성열도 Banseongyeoldo]; 盤城列島)
  - Ka Island (가도 Ka-to or Gado; 椵島) (Ch'ŏlsan County)
  - Rapto (랍도 [납도 Napdo]; 蠟島) (Ch'ŏlsan County)
  - Samch'ado (삼차도 Samchado; 參瑳島) (Ch'ŏlsan County)
  - Sinmi Island (신미도 Sinmi-to or Sinmi-do; 身彌島) (Sŏnch'ŏn County), the largest island in North Korea
  - Sohwado (소화도; 小和島) (Ch'ŏlsan County)
  - Sorapto (소랍도 Sorapdo; 小蠟島) (Ch'ŏlsan County)
  - Taehwado (대화도 Daehwado; 大和島) (Ch'ŏlsan County)
  - T'ando (탄도 Tando; 炭島) (Ch'ŏlsan County)
  - Urido (우리도; 牛里島) (Ch'ŏlsan County)
  - Numerous other islands
- Sogamdo (소감도; 小甘島) (Kwaksan County)
- Taegamdo (대감도 Daegamdo; 大甘島) (Kwaksan County)
- Unmido (운무도; 雲霧島) (Kwaksan County)

=== Yalu River islands ===
- Hwanggŭmp'yŏng (황금평 Hwanggeumpyeong; 黃金坪) (Sindo County) — formerly Hwangch'op'yŏng (황초평 Hwangchopyeong; 黃草坪)
- Imdo (임도; 任島) (Sinŭiju City) — combined by sediment with Sindo (신도; 新島)
- Kurido (구리도 Gurido; 九里島) (Ŭiju County)
- Kwanmado (관마도 Gwanmado; 官馬島) -Kurido (구리도 Gurido; 九里島) (Ŭiju County)
- Ŏjŏkto (어적도 Eojeokdo; 於赤島) (Ŭiju County) – reclamation of the former Sŭngado (승아도 Seung'ado; 勝阿島; written Sŭngaedo [승애도 Seung'aedo; 勝艾島] on a 1917 map)
- Pidansŏm (비단섬 Bidanseom; 緋緞島 Bidando) (Sindo County) — formed by a 1958 reclamation project from Sindo (신도; 薪島) and Maando (마안도; 馬鞍島); Maando is the westernmost point in Korea
- Ryuch'odo (류초도 Ryuchodo; 柳草島) (Sinŭiju City)
- Sugudo (수구도; 水口島) (Ŭiju County)
- Tajido (다지도 Dajido; 多智島) (Ŭiju County) — formed by a reclamation project from Kŏmdongdo (검동도; 黔同島), Nanjado (난자도; 欄子島), Tajido (다지도; 多智島), Mado (마도; 麻島)
- Tongnyuch'odo (동류초도 Dongryuchodo; 東柳草島) (Sinŭiju City)
- Wihwado (위화도; 威化島) (Sinŭiju City) — Ch'udo (추도; 楸島)

== Pyongyang ==
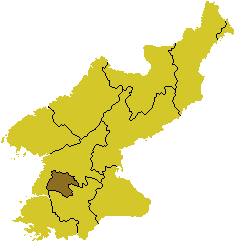

=== Taedong River islands ===
- Rŭngnado (릉라도 [능라도 Neungnado]; 綾羅島) (Pyongyang Directly Governed City)
- Turusŏm (두루섬 Duruseom; 豆老島 Durudo) (Pyongyang Directly Governed City)
- Yanggakto (양각도 Yanggakdo; 羊角島) (Pyongyang Directly Governed City)

== South Hamgyong ==
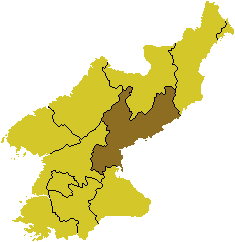

- Hwado (화도; 花島) (Chŏngp'yŏng County)
- Kŭmch'odo (전초도 Keumchodo; 全椒島) (Riwŏn County)
- Mayangdo (마양도; 馬養島) (Sinpo City)
- Sojŏdo (소저도 Sojeodo; 小猪島) (Kŭmya County)
- Taejŏdo (대저도 Daejeodo; 大猪島) (Kŭmya County)
- Ungdo (웅도; 熊島) (Kŭmya County)

== South Hwanghae ==
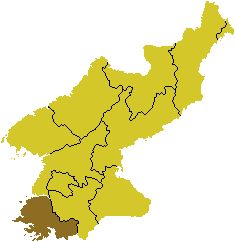

- Ch'angnindo (창린도 Changnindo; 昌麟島) (Ongjin County)
- Ch'odo (초도 Chodo; 椒島) (Kwail County)
- Kirindo (기린도 Girindo; 麒麟島) (Ongjin County)
- Mahapto (마합도 Mahapdo; 麻哈島) (Ongjin County)
- Mudo (무도; 茂島) (Kangnyŏng County)
- Ŏhwado (어화도 Eohwado; 漁化島) (Kangnyŏng County)
- Ryonghodo (룡호도 [용호도 Yonghodo]; 龍湖島) (Ongjin County)
- Ryongmaedo (룡매도 [용매도 Yongmaedo]; 龍媒島) (Ch'ŏngdan County)
- Sŏkto (석도 Seokdo; 席島) (Kwail County)
- Sosuapto (소수압도 Sosuapdo; 小睡鴨島) (Kangnyŏng County)
- Sunwido (순위도; 巡威島) (Kangnyŏng County)
- Taesuapto (대수압도 Daesuapdo; 大睡鴨島) (Kangnyŏng County)
- Wŏllaedo (월내도 Wollaedo; 月乃島) (Ryongyŏn County)
- Hambakdo (함박도 Hambakdo; (Yonan County)

== South Pyongan ==
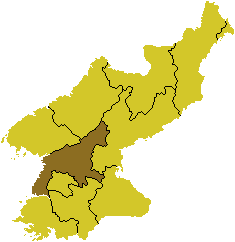

- Hach'wirado (하취라도 Hachwirado; 下吹螺島) (Onch'ŏn County)
- P'ido (피도 Pido; 避島) (Ryonggang County)
- Sangch'wirado (상취라도 Sangchwirado; 上吹螺島) (Onch'ŏn County)
- Tŏkto (덕도 Deokdo; 德島) (Onch'ŏn County)

== See also ==
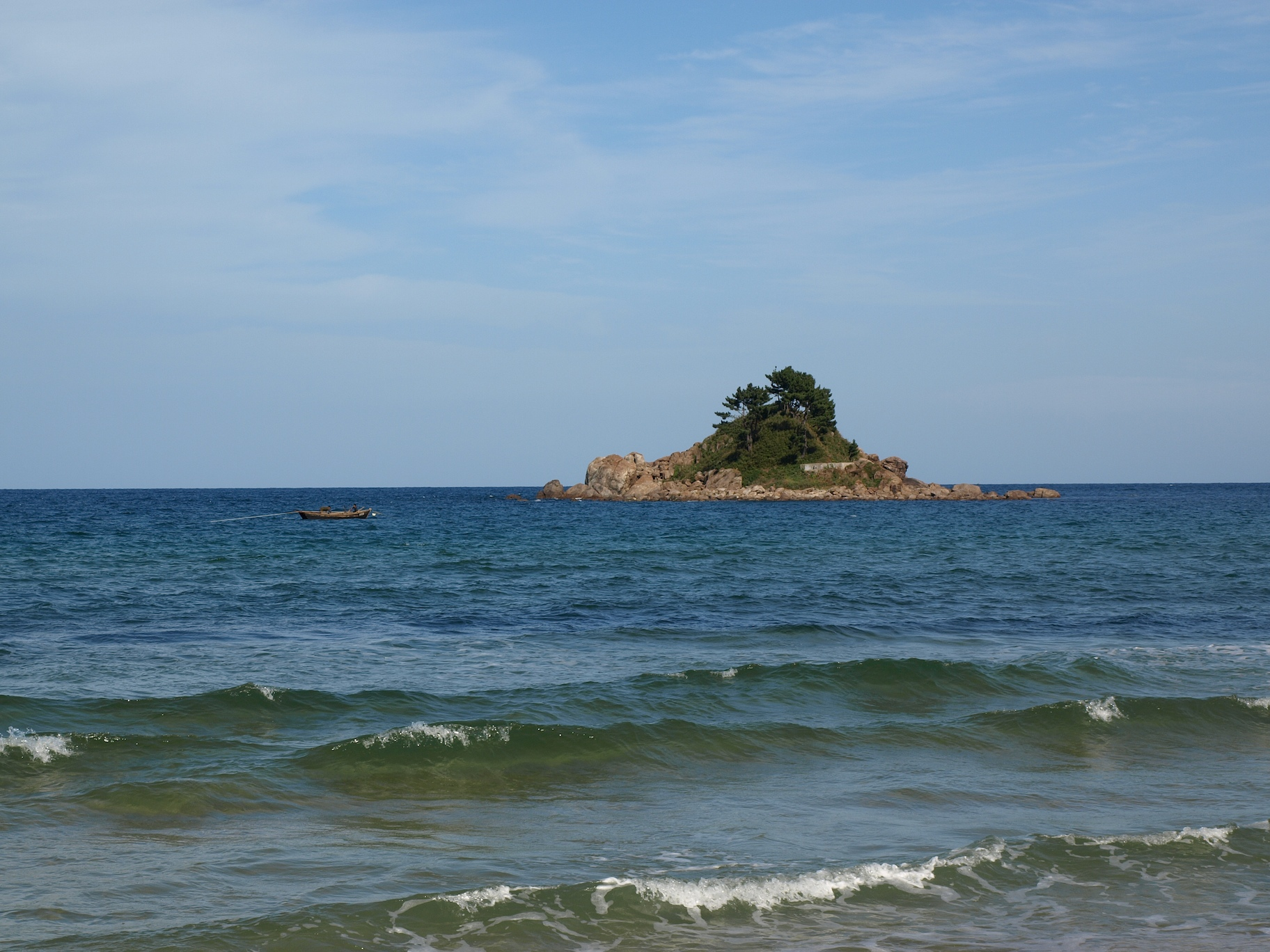
Songdo (송도; 松島) in Kangwon Province

- River islands of North Korea
- Geography of North Korea
- Islands of South Korea
- Waudo – A former island
