= China–North Korea border =

International border

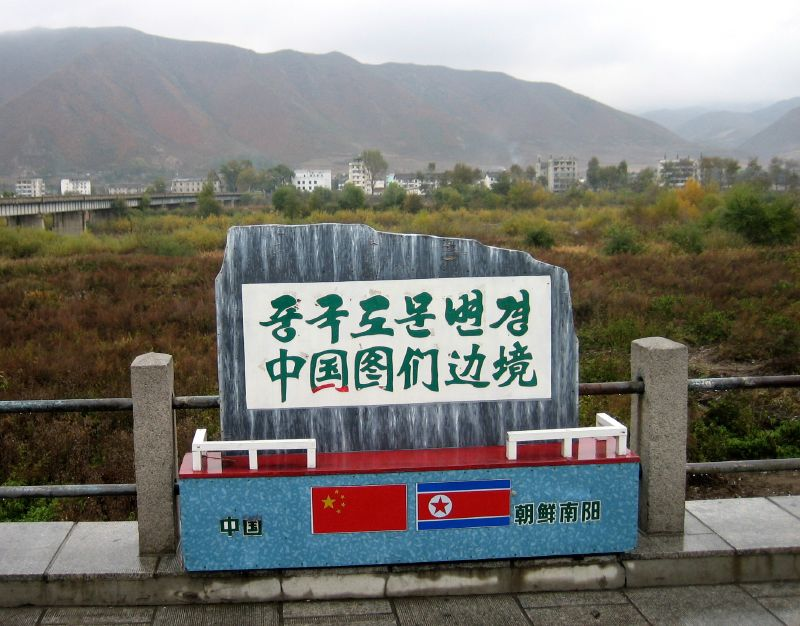
- Inscription stone marking the border between China and North Korea in Jilin

Characteristics
- Entities: China; North Korea
- Length: 1,352 kilometers (840 mi)

History
- Established: 9 September 1948; Democratic People's Republic of Korea established
- Current shape: 20 March 1964
- Treaties: Protocols on the Sino-Korean Border

Chinese and North Korean boundary markers

The China–North Korea border (Note: Chinese: 中朝边境; pinyin: Zhōngcháo Biānjìng, Korean: 조중 국경; Hanja: 朝中 國境; MR: Chojung Kukkyŏng) is an international border separating China and North Korea, extending from Korea Bay in the west to a tripoint with Russia in the east. The total length of the border is 1,352 kilometers (840 mi). The current border was created by two secret treaties signed between China and North Korea in 1962 and 1964, which included the divisions of Mount Paektu and the crater of Heaven Lake.

== Geography ==
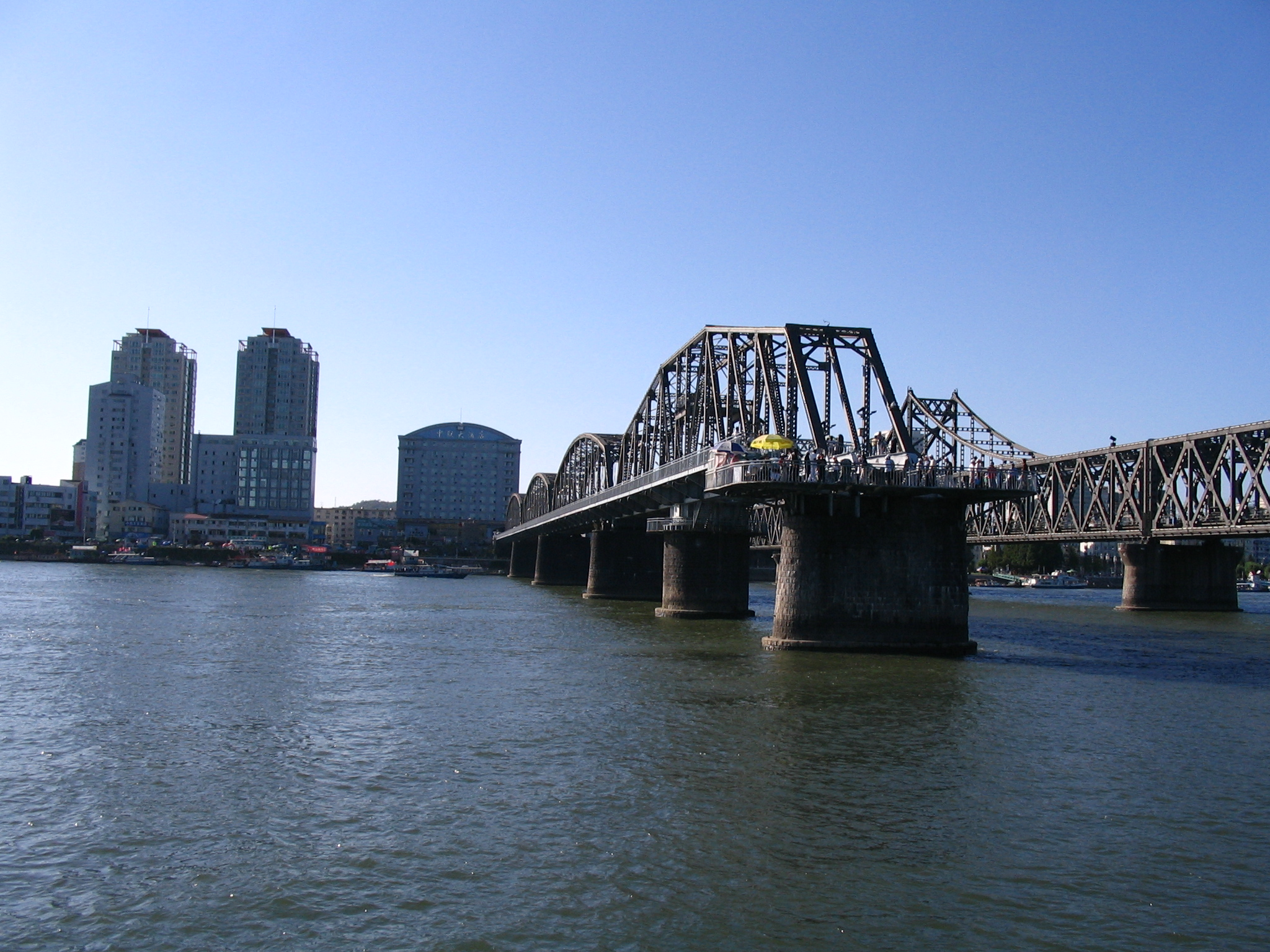
Sino-Korean Friendship Bridge (right), linking Dandong with North Korea

From west to east, the two countries are divided by three significant geographical features: the Yalu River, Paektu Mountain, and the Tumen River.

Dandong, in the Liaoning Province of China, on the Yalu River delta, is the largest city on the border. On the other side of the river is the city of Sinuiju in North Pyongan Province, North Korea. The two cities are situated on the Yalu river delta at the western end of the border, near the Yellow Sea. Their waterfronts face each other and are connected by the Sino-Korean Friendship Bridge. Both nations have invested in new border facilities, including the long-delayed New Yalu River Bridge and updated customs infrastructure at Dandong, Quanhe, and Nanping from the North Korean border.

There are 205 islands on the Yalu River. A 1962 border treaty between North Korea and China split the islands according to which ethnic group were living on each island. North Korea possesses 127 and China 78. Due to the division criteria, some islands such as Hwanggumpyong Island belong to North Korea even though they are on the Chinese side of the river. Both countries have navigation rights on the river, including in the delta.

== History ==
=== Pre-modern ===
Historically the border areas have been contested by successive Chinese and Korean polities, though the current border utilising the Yalu-Tumen rivers appears to have been in place by the mid 15th century. The Manchu (Qing) dynasty of China managed to consolidate control of north-east China (Manchuria) and establish a nebulous 'tributary' rule over Joseon Korea. In 1712, the Chinese Kangxi Emperor and Joseon King Sukjong authorised a border mission to analyse the border alignment in the vicinity of the Yalu-Tumen headwaters on Mount Paektu. A pillar was erected indicating the border alignment in this section, and a demilitarised neutral zone set along the frontier. In 1875, China fearful of the Russia presence to the east, occupied its section of the neutral zone. A Chinese-Korean boundary team surveyed the Mt Paektu area in 1885–87, however there were disputes over whether the pillar had been moved, and the two sides were unable to agree precisely which of the several headwater streams should form the frontier. In 1889, the Chinese unilaterally demarcated a frontier in the area, marking it with a series of posts, however these were later destroyed by the Koreans. Korea also made periodic claims to Korean-inhabited lands (Jiandao) north of the Tumen. The Battle of Pyongyang and the Yalu River became a victory for Japan.

In the early 20th century, Korea came under the increasing influence of Japan, and by 1905, it was deemed a Japanese protectorate. In 1909, China and Japan signed the Gando Convention, whereby Korea was made to renounce any claims north of the Yalu-Tumen line in return for extensive Chinese concessions to Japan. In Mount Paektu area of 1712 pillar was confirmed as the border marker, and the Shiyi/Sogul headwater stream utilised up to the Tumen border. The following year Japan formally annexed Korea.

=== Current border ===
Kim Il Sung, Founder and Eternal President of North Korea

Chairman Mao, Founder of Communist China

Korea achieved its independence after the surrender of Japan in 1945 and subsequently divided into two with Kim Il Sung (great-grandson of Kim Ŭngu and 34th-generation descendant of Kim T'aesŏ) became its first premier in 1948 (later as president in 1972) and then the Eternal President of North Korea in 1994. The Soviet Union's invasion of Manchuria in August 1945 led to the Soviet occupation of northern Korea during the campaign of Chongjin Landing Operation. The Soviet 25th Army was stationed in Pyongyang, and its political commissar, Colonel General Terentii Shtykov, became the de facto supreme ruler and architect of the early North Korean state until its establishment on 9 September 1948. Yakov Novichenko on the other hand with the 25th Army was at present in Pyongyang to assist the military government. Chairman Mao and the Communist Party (CPC) assumed rule over China after it won the Chinese Civil War, following the Liberation of Beijing by the PLA in 1949. Both nations emerged as communist (Marxist–Leninist) states in the post-war economy, leading to strong ideological alignment and early diplomatic relations between the two nations on 6 October 1949.

In 1962, North Korea and China signed a border treaty in secret which fixed the boundary line along the Yalu and Tumen rivers, with the middle overland section running across Mount Paektu and through Heaven Lake. A subsequent protocol in 1964 allocated the numerous riverine islets, granting 264 to North Korea and 187 to China. These two treaties define the modern border between the two countries.

Between March 1968 and March 1969, military skirmishes took place between the North Korean and Chinese forces.

== Trade and contact ==
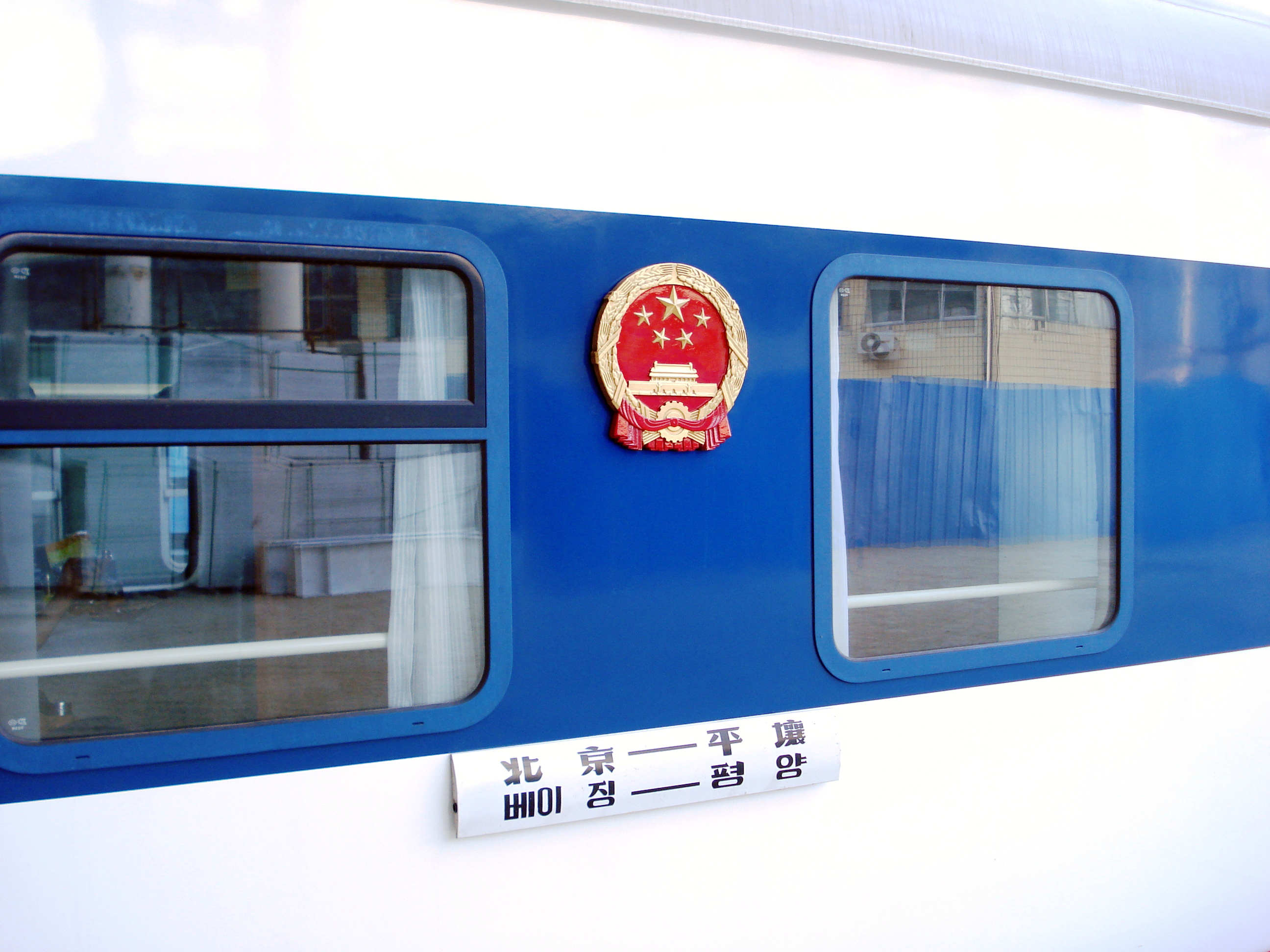
The Beijing–Pyongyang passenger train passes Dandong

North Korea's border with China has been described as its "lifeline to the outside world." Much of the China-North Korea trade goes through the port of Dandong.

As of 2012, Chinese cell phone service has been known to extend as far as 10 km (6 mi) into Korean territory, which led to the development of a black market for Chinese cell phones in the border regions. International calls are strictly forbidden in North Korea, and violators put themselves at considerable peril to acquire such phones.

As of 2015, Tourists in Dandong can take speedboat rides along the North Korean side of the Yalu River and up its tributaries.

A common wedding day event for some Chinese couples involve renting boats, putting life preservers on over their wedding clothes, and going to the North Korean border to have wedding photos taken.

In 2016, memory cards and teddy bears were reportedly among the most popular items for North Koreans shopping in Dandong.

== Crossings ==
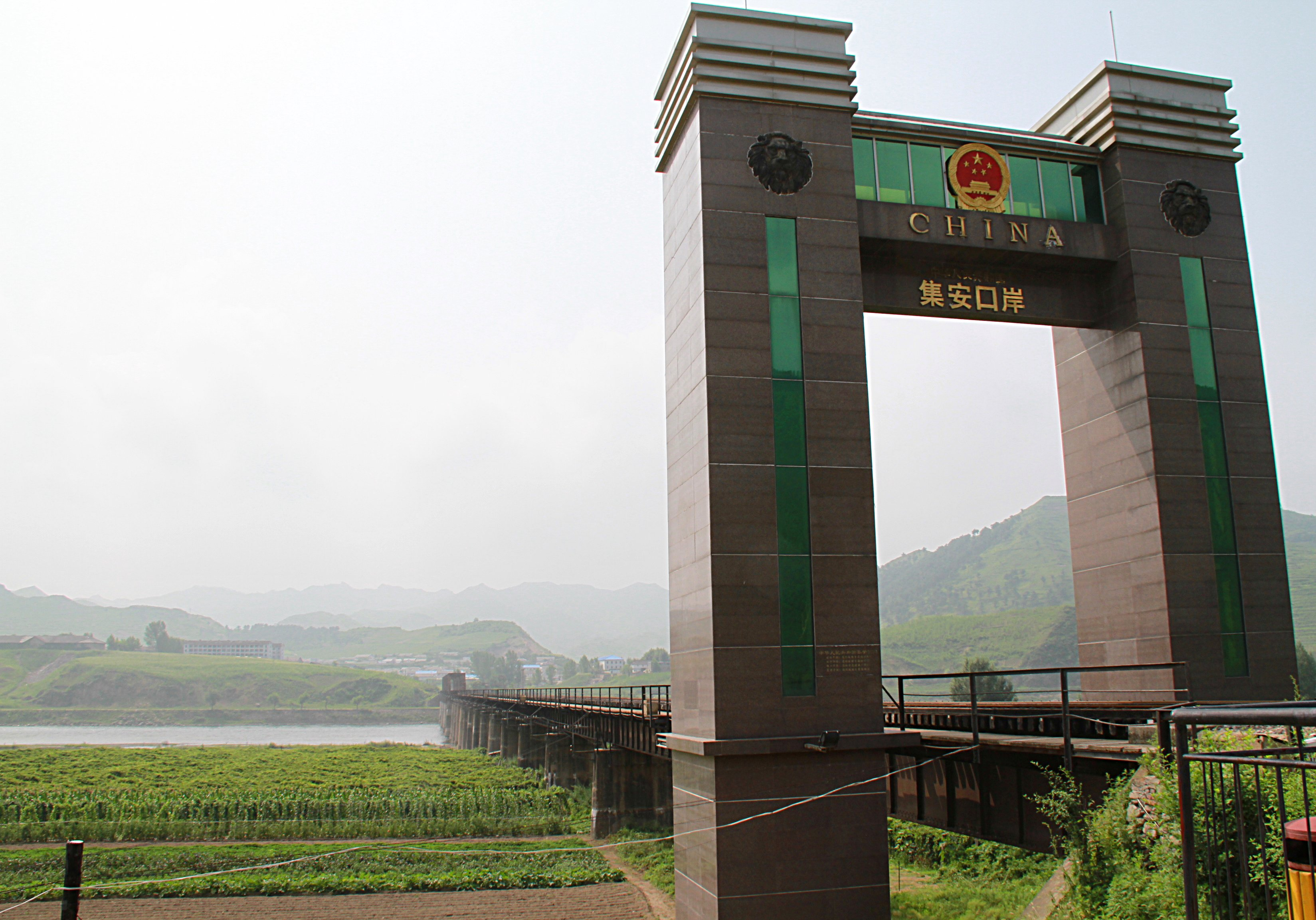
The Ji'an Railway Bridge between Ji'an, Jilin Province and Manpo, Chagang Province of North Korea.

China-North Korea Border Crossings
Name	Bordering Chinese town	Bordering Korean town	Open to third country nationals	Railway crossing	Notes
Hwanggumpyong Island	Tangchi, Zhenxing, Dandong	Sindo, North Pyongan Province	No	No	Planned
New Yalu River Bridge	Tangchi, Zhenxing, Dandong	Sinuiju, North Pyongan	No	No	Opened
Yalu River Broken Bridge	Tangchi, Zhenxing, Dandong	Sinuiju, North Pyongan	No	No	Defunct
Sino-Korean Friendship Bridge	Tangchi, Zhenxing, Dandong	Sinuiju, North Pyongan	Yes	Yes	Opened (Note: There are four weekly trains with hard and soft sleepers from Beijing to Pyongyang via the Sino–Korean Friendship Bridge, as well as a weekly carriage attached to the Vladivostok train from Moscow, via Harbin, Shenyang, and Dandong.)
Yalu River Broken Wooden Pontoon	Zhenzhu Subdistrict, Zhen'an, Dandong	Sinuiju, North Pyongan	No	Yes	Defunct
Hekou Broken Bridge	Changdian, Kuandian, Dandong	Sakchu County, North Pyongan	No	No	Defunct
Upper Hekou Railway Bridge	Changdian, Kuandian, Dandong	Sakju, North Pyongan	No	Yes	Opened
Ji'an Railway Bridge	Ji'an City, Tonghua	Manpo, Chagang	No	Yes	Opened
Ji'an Road Bridge	Ji'an City, Tonghua	Manpo, Chagang	No	No	Opened
Chagang Samgang Railway Bridge	Yunfeng Lake, Ji'an, Tonghua	Manpo, Chagang	No	Yes	Defunct
Kuunbong Railway Bridge	Yunfeng Lake, Ji'an, Tonghua	Chasong, Chagang	No	Yes	Defunct
Linjiang Yalu River Bridge	Linjiang City, Baishan	Chunggang, Chagang	No	No	Opened
Changbai-Hyesan Bridge	Changbai, Baishan	Hyesan, Ryanggang Province	No	No	Opened
Karim Bridge	Ershidaogou, Changbai, Baishan	Pochon, Ryanggang	No	No	Defunct
Samjiyon crossing	Erdaobaihe, Antu, Yanbian	Samjiyon, Ryanggang	No	No	Land Crossing Near Paektu Mountain
Guchengli Bridge	Chongshan, Helong, Yanbian	Taehongdan, Ryanggang	No	No	Opened
Nanping Bridge	Nanping, Helong, Yanbian	Musan, North Hamgyong	No	No	Opened
Sanhe Bridge	Sanhe, Longjing, Yanbian	Hoeryong, North Hamgyong	No	No	Opened
Chaokai Bridge	Kaishantun, Longjing, Yanbian	Sambong, Onsong, North Hamgyong	No	No	Opened
Tumen Border Railway Bridge	Tumen City, Yanbian	Namyang, Onsong, North Hamgyong	Yes	Yes	Opened
Tumen Border Road Bridge	Tumen City, Yanbian	Namyang, Onsong, North Hamgyong	Yes	No	Opened
Liangshui Broken Bridge	Liangshui, Tumen, Yanbian	Onsong, North Hamgyong	No	No	Defunct
Hunyung Railway Bridges	Ying'an, Hunchun, Yanbian	Hunyung, Kyongwon, North Hamgyong	No	Yes	Defunct
Shatuozi Bridge	Sanjiazi, Hunchun, Yanbian	Kyongwon, North Hamgyong	No	No	Opened
Quanhe-Yunting Bridge	Jingxin (敬信镇), Hunchun, Yanbian	Wonjong, Sonbong, Rason	Yes	No	Opened (Note: Special entry permits are required to enter Rason instead of the standard DPRK visa.)

== Border security ==
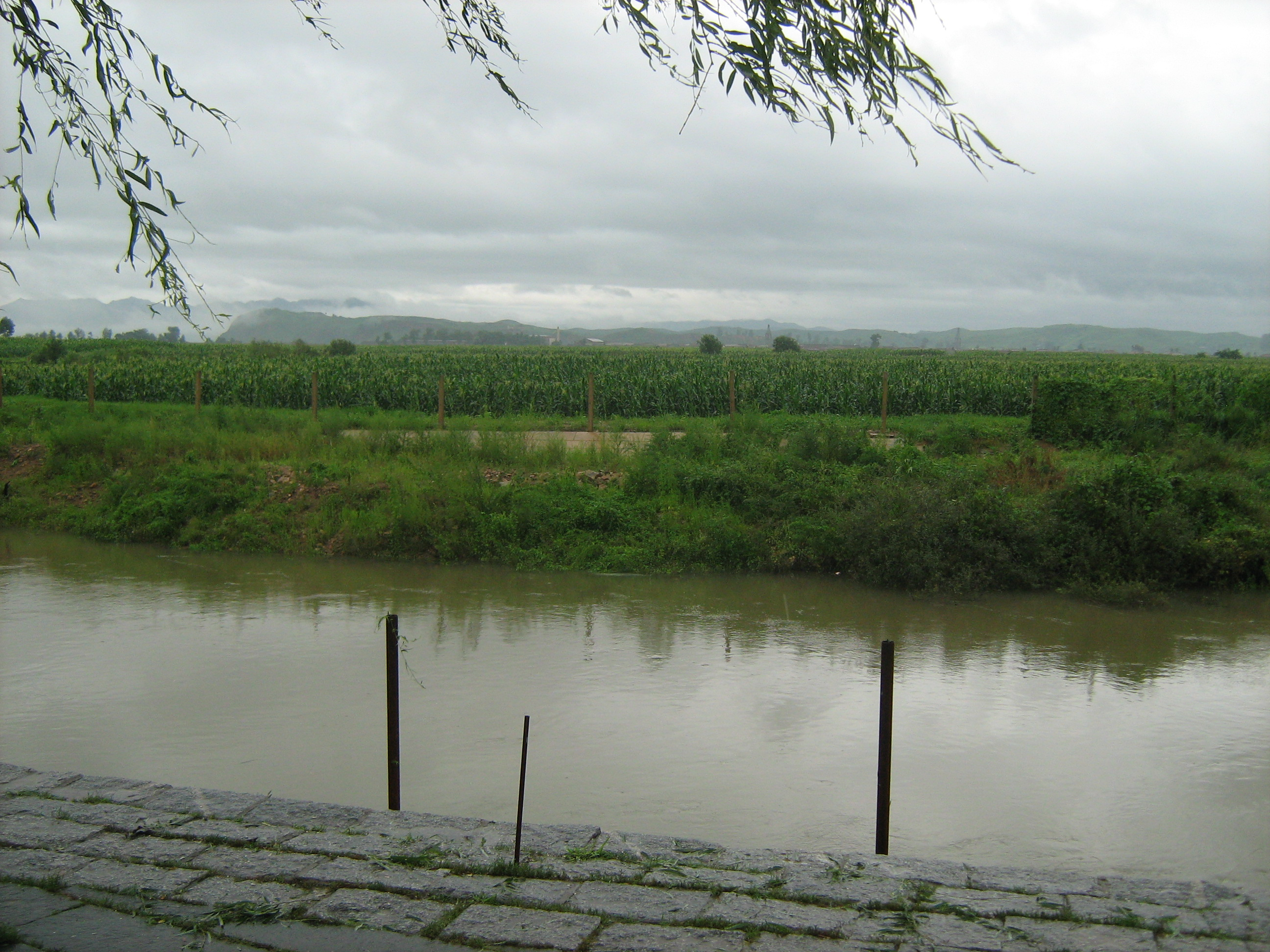
The border at the Yalu River delta near Dandong in 2012

In 2005, the border between North Korea and China was described as "porous".

The Chinese government transferred responsibility for managing the border to the army from the police in 2003. Chinese authorities began building wire fences "on major defection routes along the Tumen River" in 2003. Beginning in September 2006, China erected a 20-kilometre (12 mi) fence on the border near Dandong, along stretches of the Yalu River delta with lower banks and narrower width. The concrete and barbed wire fence ranged in height from 8 feet (2.4 m) to 15 feet (4.6 m).

In 2007 a U.S. official stated that China was building more "fences and installations at key border outposts". In the same year, it was reported that North Korea had started building a fence along a 10 kilometres (6.2 mi) stretch of its side of the Yalu River, and had also built a road to guard the area.

In 2011 it was reported that China was building fences 4 metres (13 ft) high near Dandong, and that 13 kilometres (8.1 mi) of this new fencing had been built. It was also reported that China was reinforcing patrols, and that new patrol posts were being built on higher ground to give wider visibility over the area. According to a resident of the area: "It's the first time such strong border fences are being erected here. Looks like it is related to the unstable situation in North Korea." The resident also added that previously "anybody could cross if they really wanted" as the fence had only been 10 feet (3.0 m) with no barbed wire.

In 2014, an Australian journalist who visited Dandong reported a low level of border security. In 2015, fencing was reported as the exception rather than the rule. In 2015, a photojournalist who traveled along the Chinese side of the border commented that fencing was rare and that it would be easy to cross the Yalu river when it was frozen. The same report noted friendly contact between people on opposite sides of the border. In 2018, a photojournalist drove along the border and described it as "mile after mile of nothing, guarded by no-one".

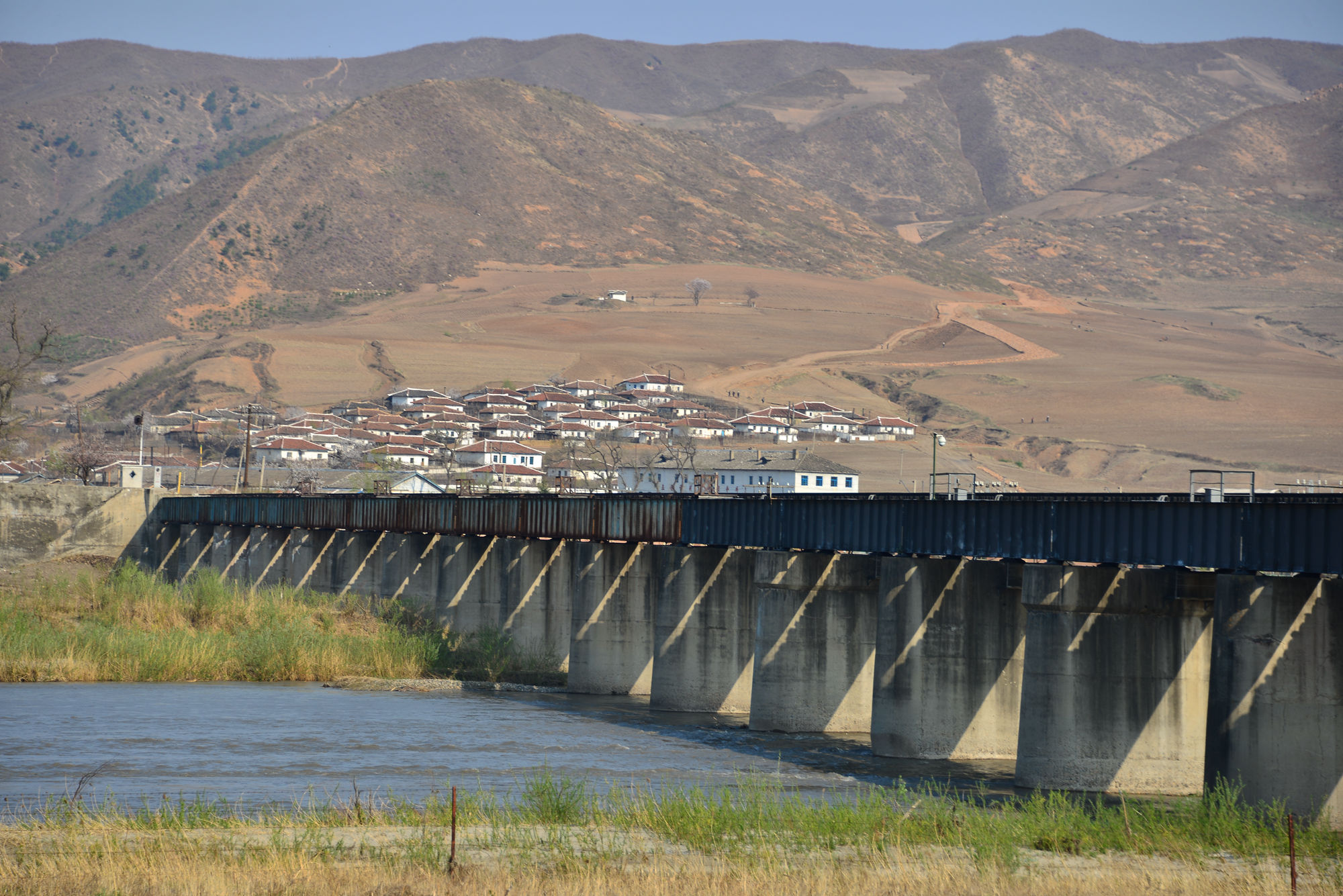
Railway bridge over the Tumen River

Seven people were killed in 2014 by North Korean border guards who had crossed the border in search of money, with locals reporting of North Korean soldiers of crossing the border to commit thefts and murders, especially during winter months when the Tumen River freezes over, allowing for easier access on foot. Later in 2015, a single rogue North Korean soldier killed four ethnic Korean citizens of China who lived along the border of China with North Korea.

Rumours of Chinese troop mobilizations on the border frequently circulate in times of heightened tension on the Korean peninsula. According to scholar Adam Cathcart, these rumours are hard to substantiate and hard to interpret.

A leaked China Mobile document that went viral on Chinese social media on 7 December 2017 allegedly revealed Chinese government plans to construct five "refugee settlement points" along the border to North Korea in Changbai county and Jilin province. This was apparently in preparation for a large influx of North Korean refugees if the Kim regime collapsed in a potential conflict with the United States. The Guardian quoted the document: "Due to cross-border tensions … the [Communist] party committee and government of Changbai county has proposed setting up five refugee camps in the county."

Border control was significantly strengthened in 2020 due to the COVID-19 pandemic. North Korea closed its border with China in January 2020. By August 2020, the regime had established a 1–2 kilometer buffer zone in front of the border where official permits were required to enter; trespassers would be "fired at without warning". In May 2023, newly constructed double walls and guard posts were observed along hundreds of kilometers of the border, according to satellite photos published by Reuters.

== Maps ==
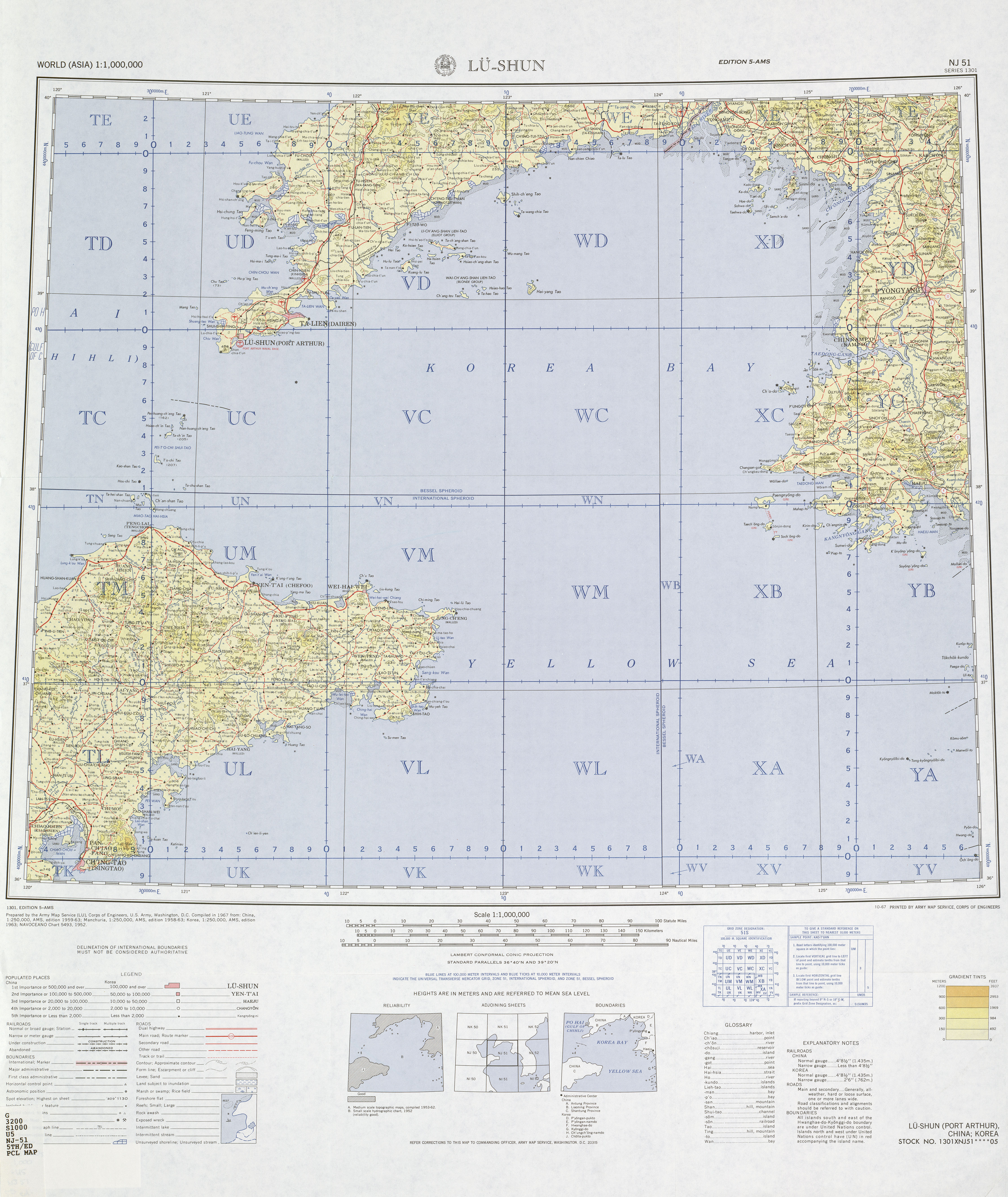
Coastal border region (Korea Bay) (Note: from map: "DELINEATION OF INTERNATIONAL BOUNDARIES MUST NOT BE CONSIDERED AUTHORITATIVE")

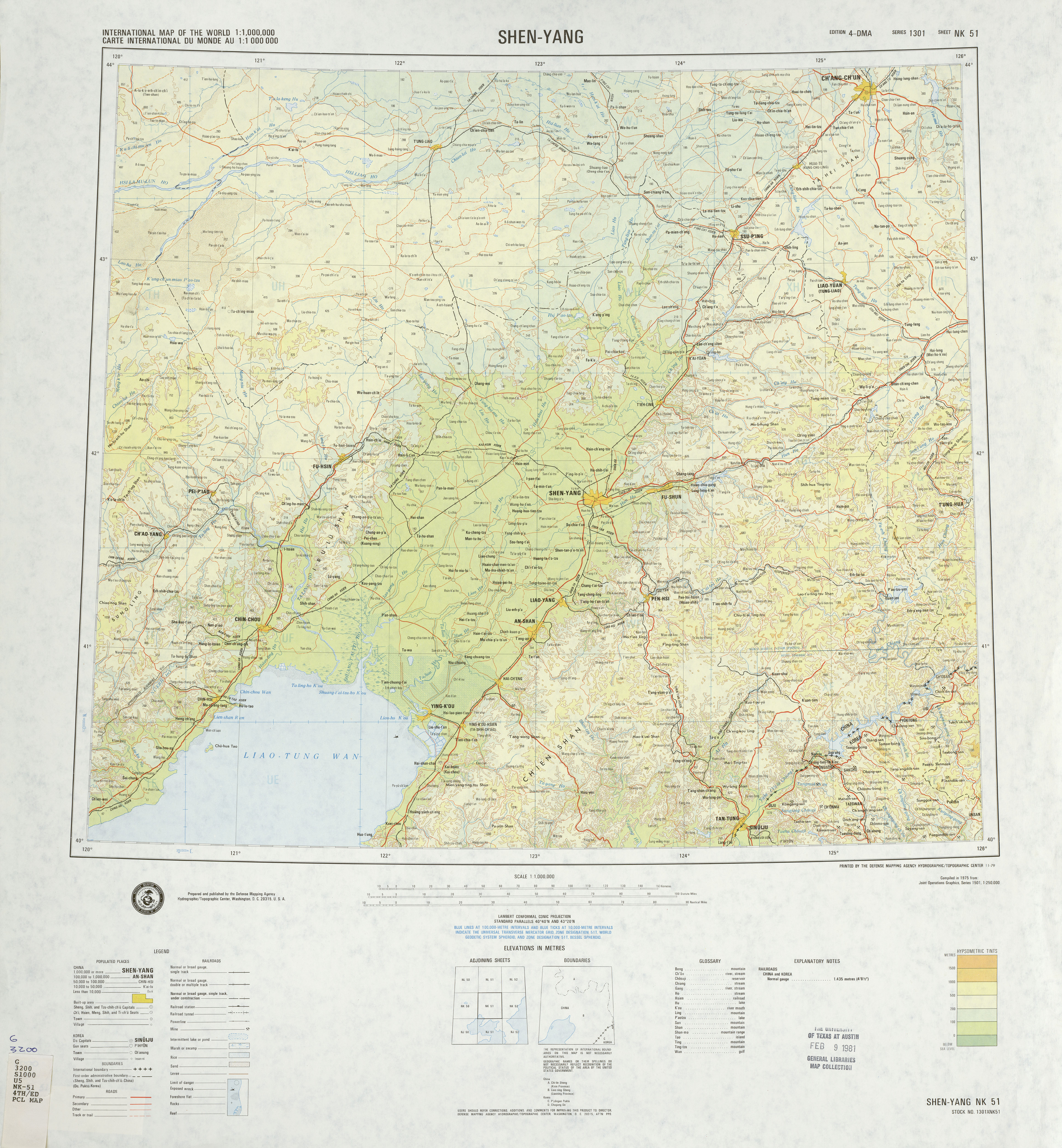
Southern/Western border region (Note: from map: "THE REPRESENTATION OF INTERNATIONAL BOUNDARIES ON THIS MAP IS NOT NECESSARILY AUTHORITATIVE.")

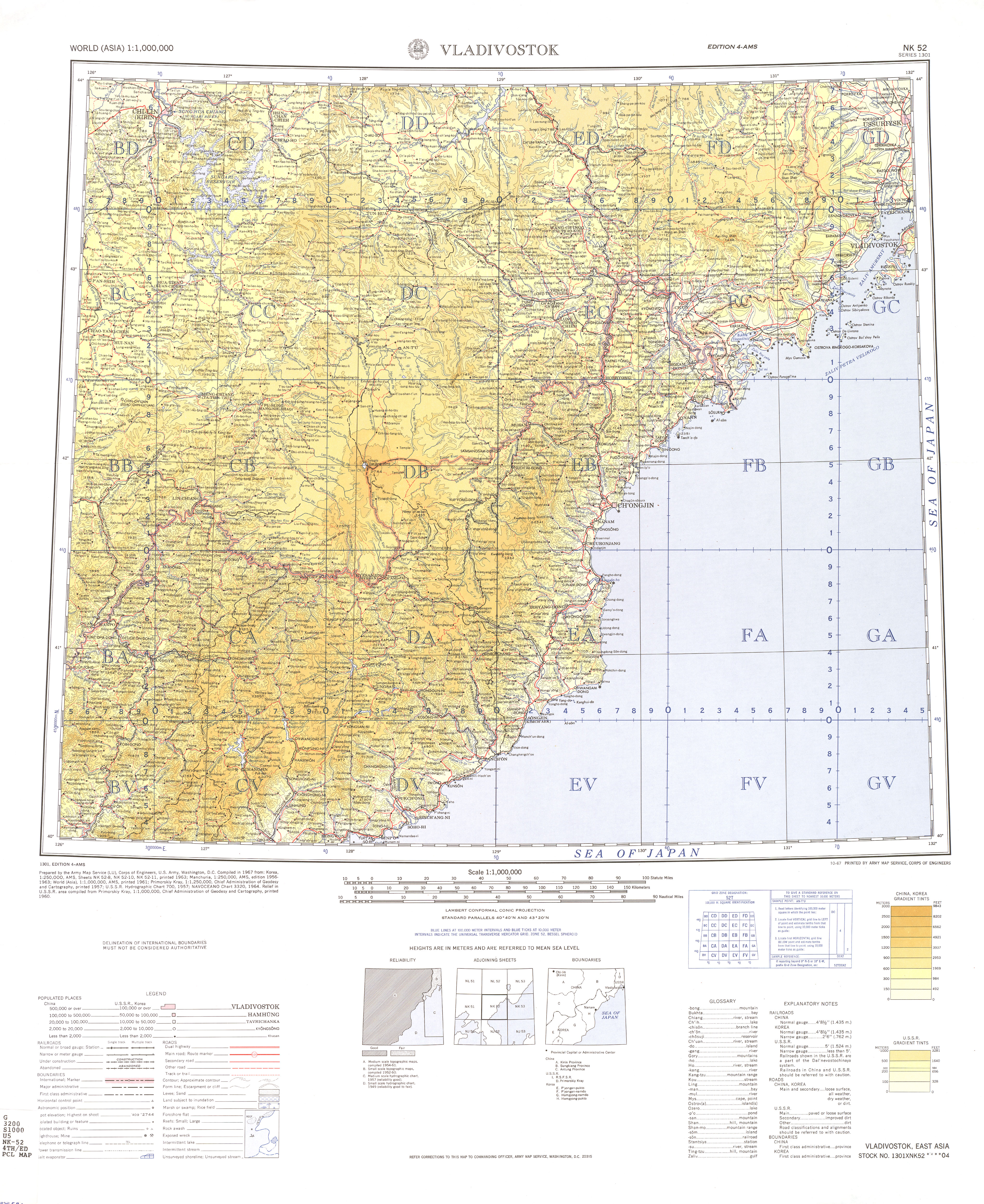
Northern/Eastern border region

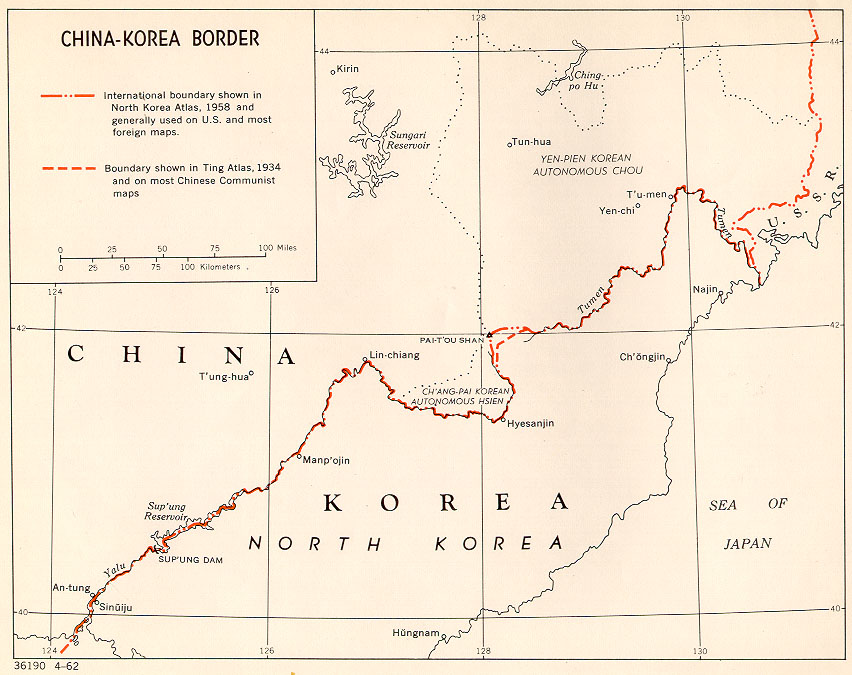
US Department of State map of the China-Korea border

Historical English-language maps of the China-Korea (PRC-DPRK) border from west to east (south to north) from the International Map of the World produced by the US Army's Army Map Service and the Defense Mapping Agency, mid-20th century. The map on the far right was produced by the US Department of State in 1962, and shows the former disputed zone around Mount Paektu.

== See also ==
- North Korean defectors
- China–North Korea relations
