= Sinmi Island =

North Korean island

- Location within North Korea

Geography
- Location: West Korea Bay
- Coordinates: 39°34′N 124°53′E
- Archipelago: Pansong Archipelago
- Area: 52 km^{2} (20 sq mi)

Administration
- North Korea

Korean name
- Hangul: 신미도
- Hanja: 身彌島
- RR: Sinmido
- MR: Sinmido

Sinmi Island (Korean: 신미도) is a North Korean island in the Pansong Archipelago in West Korea Bay. With an area of 52 square kilometers (20 sq mi), it is the largest island in North Korea.
