= Ka Island =

Island of North Korea

Ka Island Ga Island
- Location within North Korea

Geography
- Location: Bay of Korea, Yellow Sea
- Coordinates: 39°32′55″N 124°39′59″E
- Archipelago: Pansongs
- Area: 19.2 km^{2} (7.4 sq mi)
- Highest elevation: 333 m (1093 ft)
- Highest point: Yeondae-bong (연대봉)

Administration
- North Korea

Ka Island (alternately, Ga Island) is a North Korean island in the Pansong Archipelago in West Korea Bay. It lies just south of the Cholsan Peninsula. It includes Ka Island Village (가도리, Kado-ri) and forms part of North Korea's Cholsan County.

== Names ==
- Ka Island
- Hangul: 가도
- Hanja: 椵島
- Lit.: Pomelo Island
- RR: Gado
- MR: Kado

Pi Island
- Traditional Chinese: 皮㠀
- Simplified Chinese: 皮岛
- Literal meaning: Hides Island
Transcriptions
Standard Mandarin
- Hanyu Pinyin: Pídǎo
- Wade–Giles: P'i-tao

Dongjiang Garrison
- Traditional Chinese: 東江鎭
- Simplified Chinese: 东江镇
- Literal meaning: East River Town
Transcriptions
Standard Mandarin
- Hanyu Pinyin: Dōngjiāng zhèn
- Wade–Giles: Tung-chiang Chên

"Ka Island" or "Ka-to" is the official North Korean romanization of the island's name, using North Korea's official romanization system. Since 2000, its South Korean equivalent has been "Gado" or "Ga-do", using its Revised Romanization system. In Chinese sources, the same name appears as Jiadao. The names all translate as "Pomelo Island".

In the 17th century, the Chinese knew Ka as "Hides Island", which appears in English accounts of the era as Pi Island or Pidao. It was also known as the Dongjiang Garrison, from Mao Wenlong's settlement there.

== History ==
Ming soldiers were stationed on the island during the reigns of the Joseon kings Gwanghae (r. 1608–1623) and Injo (r. 1623–1649). Owing to the Later Jin invasion of Liaoning, the island flooded with both Ming troops and northern refugees.

The Ming general Mao Wenlong attacked from and retreated to Ka Island during the 1621 Battle of Fort Zhenjiang. He then used the island as a personal base of operations from 1622. Obliged to remain off the Korean mainland by Manchu pressure on the Joseon court, Mao justified his occupation of the island as an "area of strategic importance" (扼要區, èyào qū) able to "defend Dengzhou and Laizhou southwards, stay in connection with Korea eastwards, and attack the Manchu northwards". By 1628, there were 26,000 troops who—together with their dependents—consumed 100,000 seom of rice. Its supply was largely organized from the port of Dengzhou (now Penglai) on the north coast of China's Shandong Peninsula, but—partially owing to continued Korean gratitude for the Ming's help repelling Japan—this was supplemented by a Korean levy known as the "western provisions tax" (sŏryang) that ultimately contributed about 260,000 seom of rice. (Note: Mao also extorted ships, guns, horses, and ginseng from the Koreans.) Because of the irregularity of Chinese supply and the frequency of Korean famines, Mao also established farming colonies on the nearby mainland at Cholsan ("Tieshan"), Changsong ("Changcheng"), and Uiju ("Yizhou").

After the fall of Lüshun to the Manchu, Mao was freed from most oversight and began to establish Ka as an independent maritime kingdom with open markets at Ka and Tieshan. He attempted to negotiate an official free trade policy between China and Korea, ending their remaining sea bans and restrictions on exportation of goods considered strategically important, but also aimed to restrict Korea's direct tributary trade with China, instead driving its goods to his markets. He charged visiting merchants high taxes but protected all comers, including raiders and smugglers, and so drew in much of the Yellow Sea trade between Manchuria, China, and Korea. Scholars estimate he was able to collect tens of thousands of silver tael a year; he also sought supplies of Korean copper and iron to mint his own currency.

Even after Mao's assassination by the Ming in 1629, troops and refugees remained stationed on the island until 1636. As preparation for the Manchu's second invasion of Korea, Hong Taiji traveled to Zhenjiang and sent Abatai, Jirgalang, and Ajige to secure its western coast in the 12th lunar month of 1636. Shen Shikui was well ensconced in Ka Island's fortifications and hammered his attackers with heavy cannon for over a month. In the end, Ming and Korean defectors including Kong Youde landed 70 boats on the eastern side of the island and drew out his garrison in that direction. On the next morning, however, he found that the Qing—"who seem to have flown"—had landed to his rear in the northwest corner of the island in the middle of the night. Shen refused to surrender, but was overrun and beheaded by Ajige. Official reports put the casualties as at least 10,000, with few survivors. The Ming general Yang Sichang then withdrew the remaining Ming forces in Korea to Denglai in northern Shandong. (The removal of the Chinese settlement is sometimes portrayed as reducing the tax burden on nearby Korean settlements, but in fact the Qing merely continued them under another name.)

In late October 1951, the PLA made a concerted push to remove UN troops from islands near the mouth of the Yalu. The most significant was Taehwa Island, but Ka Island was also assaulted during the night of 5 November and then strafed by Yak fighters on 14 November. During the second attack, the garrison was defeated and driven off the island.
