= Zhenan =

Zhenan may refer to:

- Zhen'an County (镇安县), Shangluo, Shaanxi
- Zhen'an District (振安区), Dandong, Liaoning
- Zhenan Min (浙南闽语), variety of Min Nan Chinese spoken in southern Zhejiang

Towns (镇安镇)

- Zhen'an, Kai County, in Kai County, Chongqing
- Zhen'an, Yun'an County, Guangdong
- Zhen'an, Longling County, in Longling County, Yunnan
