= Zhenzhu =

Zhenzhu may refer to:

== Chinese other beings' names ==
- Zhēnzhǔ (真主) a Chinese name for Allah, literally "true host" implying that He is the true God in Islam.
- Zhēnzhū (珍珠) the Chinese name for pearls, literally "jane pearls."
- Zhenzhu Khan (died 645), khagan of Xueyantuo
- Zhenzhu Yabgu (died 659), claimant to the throne of Western Turkic Khaganate
- Zhenzhu Subdistrict, Zhen'an District, Dandong, Liaoning, China
- Zhen Zhu, a variety of the ornamental aquarium fish flowerhorn cichlid
- Hua Xiren, a character from the Chinese novel Dream of the Red Chamber, originally named Zhenzhu (or Hua Zhenzhu)
