= Nampo Dam =

Dam in North Korea

Coordinates: 38.6757°N 125.1764°E

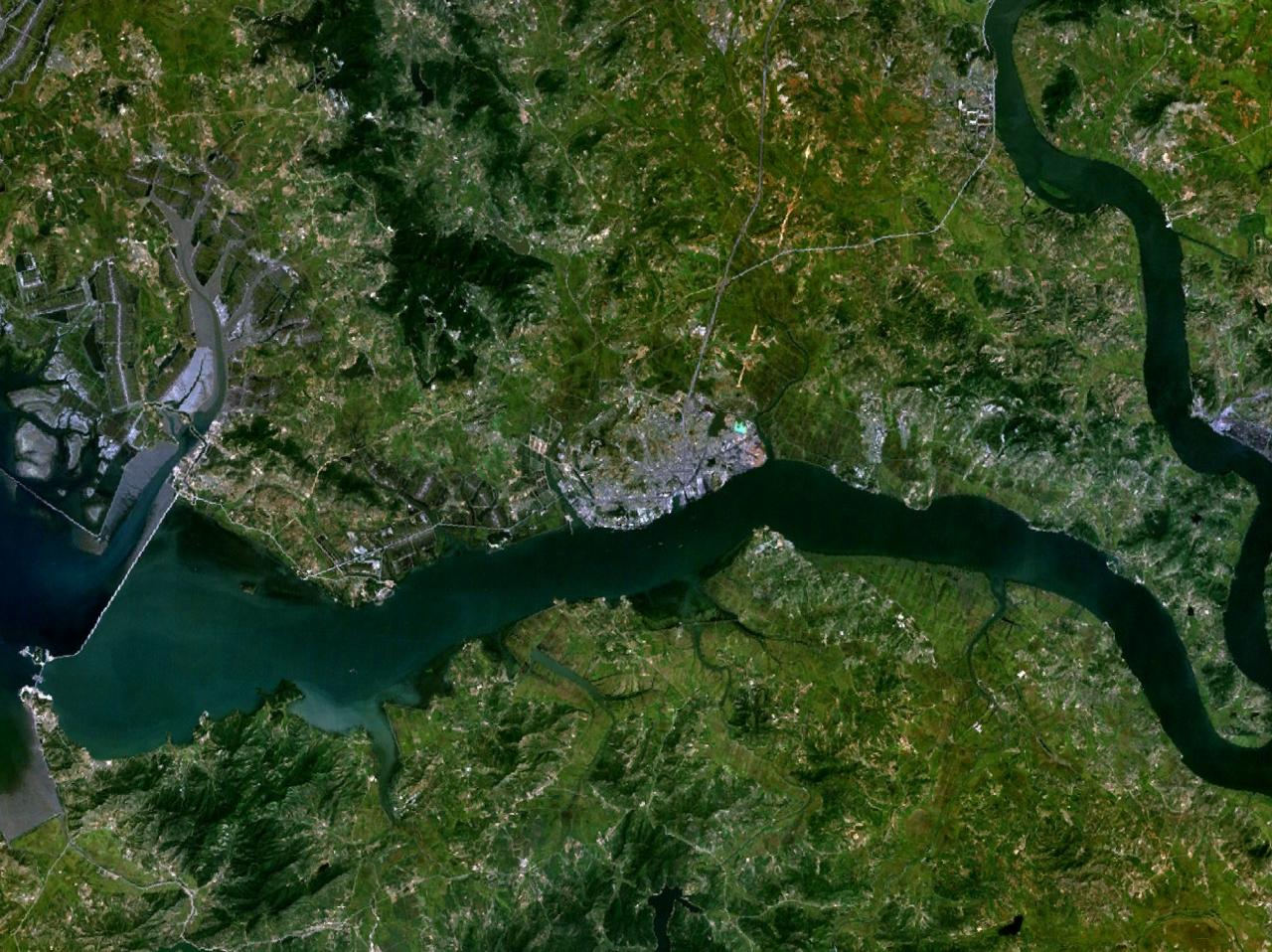
- Satellite photograph showing the West Sea Barrage. The Taedong River flows from right to left and the city of Nampho is on the north bank of the river in the center of the image. the West Sea Barrage is to the left, at the mouth of the river.

Korean name
- Hangul: 서해갑문
- Hanja: 西海閘門
- RR: Seohae gammun
- MR: Sŏhae kammun

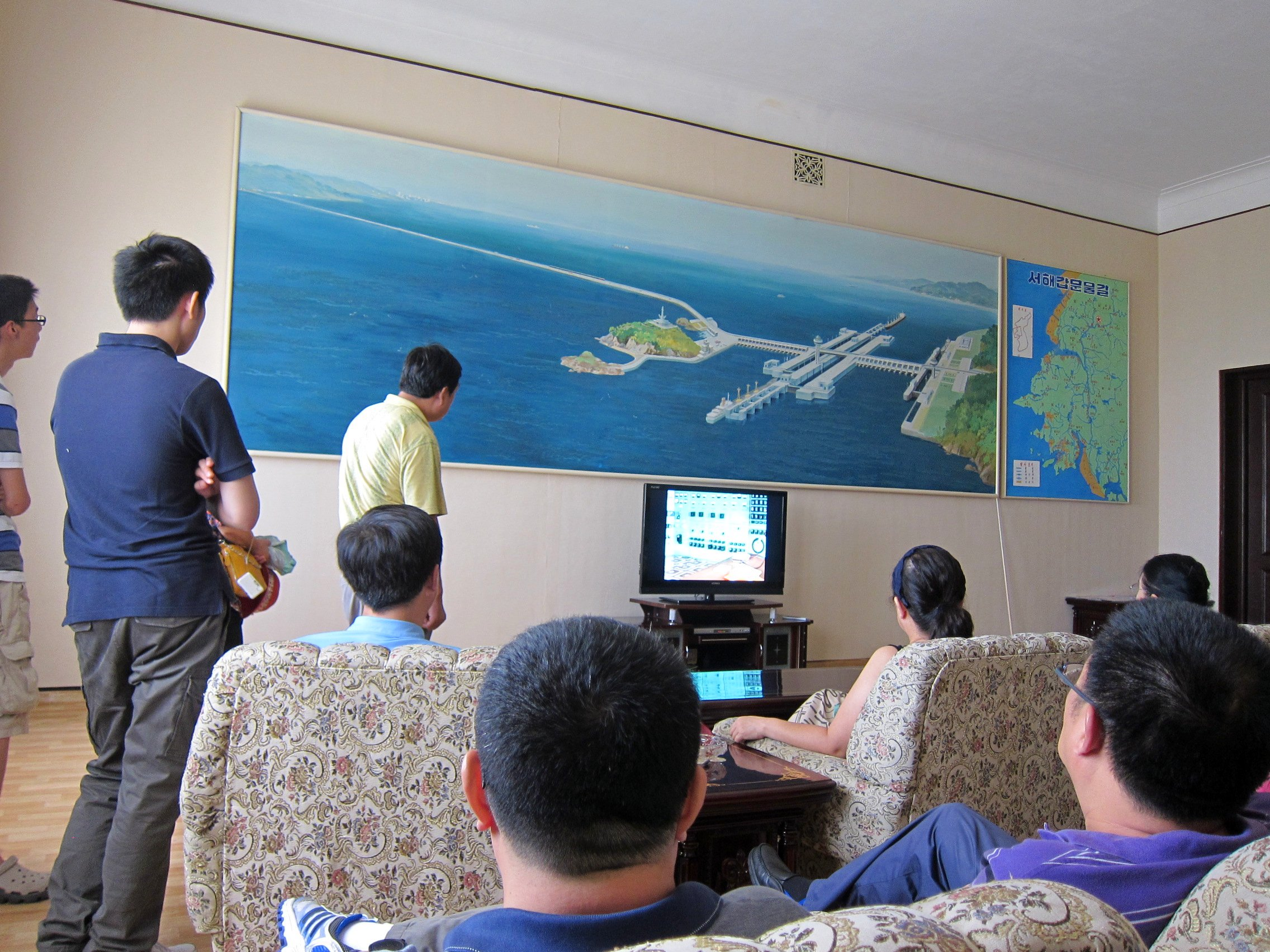
Film screening about the construction of the dam and the locks, in Nampo Dam visitor center

The Nampho Dam or West Sea Dam, also known as the West Sea Barrage or West Sea Lock Gate,^{[a]} is a tidal barrage located 15 km west of the special city of Nampho, North Korea. It is a large, eight-km-long system of dams, three lock chambers, and 36 sluices, allowing the passage of ships up to 50,000 tons. The dam closes the estuary of the Taedong River off from the Yellow Sea. It was built by the North Korean Army from 1981 to 1986, with the resources of the whole country directed to this main construction project. The West Sea Barrage Line runs over the dam.

The stated goal of the dam was:

- The prevention of seawater intrusion into the fresh water, thus solving the water supply problem;
- The irrigation of additional land, enlarging the arable territory of the region.

The dam is considered a major accomplishment of North Korea, and is a commonly seen backdrop for North Korean television news broadcasts from Korean Central News Agency. It is also a popular stop for tour groups of international tourists, for whom there is a visitor centre on P'i Do Island where films are shown about the construction of the dam and the locks.

The dam's estimated total cost was US$4 billion.

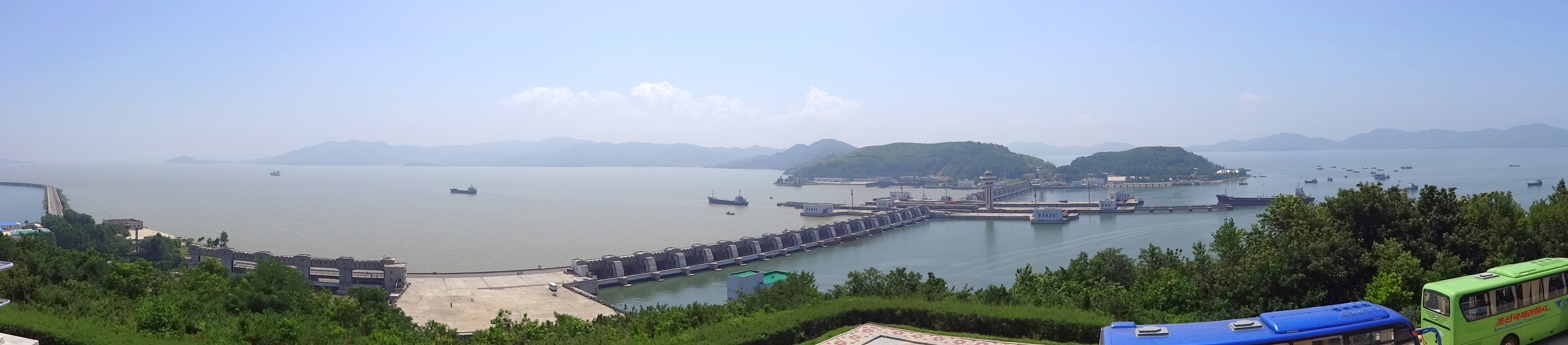
Panorama of Nampo Dam taken in 2012 from the roof of the visitor centre, looking inland along Taedong River. The start of the approximately 7 km long barrage can be seen to the right, the wide mouth of the Taedong River in the center, the locks towards the right, and the Yellow Sea on the far left of the picture.

== Notes ==
a The term West Sea Gate or West Sea Lock are also used for a smaller dam located in Incheon, South Korea.
