= Wihwa Island =

Island of North Korea

- Location within North Korea

Geography
- Location: Yalu River
- Coordinates: 40.137°N 124.446°E,

Administration
- North Korea
- County: Sindo County
- Province: North P'yŏngan

Demographics
- Ethnic groups: Koreans

Wihwa Island (Korean: 위화도/威化島, Wihwado, Chinese: 威化島) is a river island in the Yalu River, lying on the border between North Korea and China. It is now under the effective jurisdiction of North Korea, due to ethnic Koreans living on the island at the time of the 1962 border treaty.

Wihwa Island is historically well known for being where General Yi Songgye decided, in 1388, to turn back his army southward to Kaesong in the first of a series of revolts that eventually led to the establishment of the Yi Dynasty.

In June 2011, an agreement with China was made to establish a joint free trade area on Hwanggumpyong and Wihwa Islands, and the China border area near Dandong.
