= Wihwado Retreat =

1388 retreat of Goryeo's general Yi Sŏng-gye

Coup of 1388
Date	22 May – 3 June 1388
Location	Kaesŏng, Goryeo (now part of North Korea)
Result	Coup successful: King U deposed.; Crown Prince Chang assumes the throne and later replaced by King Gongyang.; Gen. Ch'oe Yŏng banished to Goyang and later executed.; Subsequent end of the Goryeo period and start of the Joseon period with Gen. Yi Sŏng-gye crowned as King Taejo.

Belligerents
Insurgents led by Gen. Yi Sŏng-gye and Gen. Cho Min-su	Goryeo led by Gen. Ch'oe Yŏng

Commanders and leaders
Yi Sŏng-gye; Cho Min-su	King U Ch'oe Yŏng

Strength
50,000 troops	5,000

Casualties and losses
Unknown	Unknown

The Wihwado Retreat, or Turning back the army from Wihwa Island (Korean: 위화도 회군; Hanja: 威化島 回軍) refers to the 1388 episode in which General Yi Sŏng-gye of the Goryeo dynasty was ordered to march north with his army and invade the Liaodong Peninsula (northeast China, which was under the control of the Ming dynasty), but instead decided to turn back to Kaesong and stage a coup d'état.^{가}

General Yi Sŏng-gye had gained power and respect during the late 1370s and early 1380s by pushing Mongol remnants off the Korean Peninsula and also by repelling well-organized Japanese pirates in a series of successful engagements. He was also credited with routing the Red Turbans when they made their move into the Korean Peninsula as part of their rebellion against the Yuan dynasty. Following the rise of the Ming dynasty under Zhu Yuanzhang, the royal court in Goryeo split into two competing factions: the group led by General Yi (supporting the Ming dynasty) and the camp led by his rival General Ch'oe (supporting the Yuan dynasty).

When a Ming messenger came to Goryeo in 1388 (the 14th year of King U) to demand the return of a significant portion of Goryeo's northern territory, General Ch'oe Yŏng seized the opportunity and played upon the prevailing anti-Ming atmosphere to argue for the invasion of the Liaodong Peninsula (Goryeo claimed to be the successor of the ancient kingdom of Goguryeo; as such, restoring Manchuria as part of Korean territory was a tenet of its foreign policy throughout its history).

King U ordered General Yi to invade Liaodong Peninsula and attack the new Ming dynasty army in support of the Mongols, despite the General's protest. General Yi gave four reasons why conquering Liaodong was impossible (사불가론). The four reasons were (1) the small cannot go up against the big (meaning a small state like Goryeo cannot win a war against Ming, the big state); (2) the military should not be mobilized in the summer; (3) sending vast troops to the north would create an opportunity for the Japanese pirates to invade and pillage Goryeo villages; and (4) a national military campaign during a monsoon season is prone to arrows and bows coming unglued (due to humidity) and infectious diseases. In 1388, Yi arrived at Wihwa Island on the Amnok River, also known as the Yalu River, and realized that the Ming forces outnumbered his own. Instead of pressing on with the invasion, he made a momentous decision, commonly called "withdrawing the army from Wihwa Island", that would alter the course of Korean history. Knowing of the support he enjoyed both from high-ranking government officials and the general populace, and with the great deterrent of Ming Empire under the Hongwu Emperor, Yi decided to revolt and swept back to the capital, Gaegyeong, to mount a coup d'état and wrest control of the government. This was the first in a series of Yi's rebellious actions that eventually led to the founding of the Joseon dynasty. Yi's son, Yi Bang-won, who later became Taejong, the third king of Joseon, evacuated Yi's family during General Yi's coup.

Formed in July 1392, Yi's dynasty lasted through independence from tribute to China and the establishment of the Korean Empire in October 1897, finally coming to an end upon Japan's annexation of Korea in August 1910.

In South Korea, the Wihwado retreat is often used as an analogy of an army marching toward the capital to mount a coup.

== Cultural references ==
=== Film ===
- The Pirates (2014)
- Seondal: The Man Who Sells the River (2016)

=== Talk show ===
- The Day of the Historical Journal (2013-)

=== Television ===
- Jeong Do-jeon (2014)
- My Country: The New Age (2019): This work shows a fictionalised account of the event.
- Six Flying Dragons (2015-2016)
- Tears of the Dragon (1996-1998)
- The King of Tears, Lee Bang-won (2021-2022)

== See also ==
- Wihwa Island
- Ming campaign against the Uriankhai
- Crossing the Rubicon

== Notes ==
^가 The English word 'retreat' commonly implies withdrawing due to a military defeat. However, the Wihwado retreat does not fit this definition. In this context, 'retreat' refers to strategically repositioning troops, not in response to a defeat, but as a deliberate tactical maneuver.

== Source ==
- John K. Fairbank, "East Asia: Tradition and Transformation" (Harvard University Press, 1989)
