= Gao Jingde =

Chinese politician

Gunter Gao Jingde (Chinese: 高敬德, also known as Ko King-tak) is a member of the Chinese People's Political Consultative Conference (CPPCC) of the People's Republic of China. In April 2010, he was vice-chairman of its Committee of Education, Science, Culture, Health and Sports.

Gao is chairman of Hong Kong private investment company Sunbase International (Holdings) Ltd (Chinese: 新恆基國際(集團)有限公司), established in 1991. The business is active in property investment, transport, infrastructure and technology sectors. A subsidiary, Sunbase International Properties Management Limited, manages all 19 military sites held by the People’s Liberation Army in Hong Kong and provides services to the Hong Kong Government and the Hong Kong branch of the Xinhua news agency.

In June 2011, it was reported that Gao had made two visits to North Korea in 2010 and had secured rights to develop Hwanggumpyong Island as an industrial complex. The island is located at the estuary of the Yalu River, between China's and North Korea's border cities of Dandong and Sinuiju, respectively. He had met with Kim Yong-nam, president of the Presidium of the North Korean Supreme People's Assembly, before a groundbreaking ceremony for the development.

In August 2012, Gao announced that Sunbase would be investing RMB10 billion in oil refining, rubber and related industries in Anning City, Kunming, China.

In March 2016, the District Court in Hong Kong revealed that Sunbase had failed to submit tax returns from 2003 to 2008 due to failure to compile financial statements and had been sued by the Inland Revenue Department.

Gao is a member of the small-circle Election Committee which selects the Chief Executive of the Hong Kong Special Administration Region government. In June 2016, it was reported that a total of eight organisations with votes on the committee had the same registered address as Sunbase, including the Association of Chinese Culture in Hong Kong of which he is chairman.

Gao, as chairman of Hongkong New Henderson International Group, established a joint venture with Hubei Changjiang Publishing & Media Group (Holdings) Limited in June 2016 which was expected to embody "'six dry' spirit" put forward by Minister Liang Weinian of the Hubei Provincial Party Committee Publicity Department.

On 21 November 2016, at a political fundraising auction held by the Chinese Communist Party's most-favoured political party in Hong Kong, the Democratic Alliance for the Betterment and Progress of Hong Kong (DAB), Gao attracted media attention by paying HK$38.8 million for a four Chinese character work of calligraphy of dubious artistic value produced for the event by the CCP's top representative in Hong Kong at the time.

In late November 2017, Gao, on behalf of a Sunbase-led consortium, proposed building Scandinavia's largest port, at the tiny community of Lysekil, Sweden. The secret offer, with a 10-day expiry, was accepted by the local town officials without public consultation or consideration at the national level, notwithstanding its economic, environmental and security significance. Under Swedish law, the power to approve such projects is entirely in the hands of the local municipal administration and cannot be challenged from above, so it was expected to proceed.
