= Pidansom =

Coordinates: 39°51′42″N 124°13′55″E

Pidansom (Korean: 비단섬, Chinese: 緋緞島: Chouduan Island) is a river island in the Yalu River in North Korea. Pidansom was developed by merging of several river islands such as Sindo Island (薪島) and Maando (馬鞍島) in the 1960s. The island is home to a fishing cooperative and is also used for agriculture.

During the Ming dynasty, Sindo was still a small hilly island, and it was assigned to the Kingdom of Korea on the map at that time. This was also recognized in the treaty between the Qing Dynasty and the Japanese colonial government. However, as sediment accumulated, Sindo was connected to the mainland. China and North Korea have a treaty, and ships can sail freely in the Yalu River. But despite this, the land ownership of the Yalu River Estuary still restricts the development of Dandong Port, causing China to build a port in Donggang City in the west.

== See also ==
- Sindo County
