= Pansong Archipelago =

Island chain in the Korea Bay, North Korea

- Chosŏn'gŭl: 반성렬도
- Hancha: 盤城列島
- Revised Romanization: Banseong Ryeoldo
- McCune–Reischauer: Pansŏng Ryŏlto

Locator map of the Pansong Archipelago

The Pansong or Banseong Archipelago is a chain of islands located off the coast of Cholsan county, North Korea. The chain includes North Korea's largest island, Sinmi-do.

The major islands in the archipelago are:

- Sinmi-to (신미도/身彌島)
- Ka-to (가도/椵島)
- Tan-to (탄도/炭島)
- Honggon-to (홍건도/洪建島)
- Taehwa-to (대화도/大和島), home to a small naval base at 39°26′2″N 124°37′5″E)
- Sohwa-to (소화도/小和島)
- Hoe-to (회도/灰島)

The archipelago also includes many smaller islands, including

- Nabi-som (나비섬)
- Uri-to (우리도/牛里島)
- Taekacha-to (대가차도/大加次島)
- Sokacha-to (소가차도/小加次島)
- Taedu-to (대두도/大豆島)
- Pugun-to (부군도/府郡島)
- Taejongjok-to (대정족도/大鼎足島)
- Ung-to (웅도/熊島)
- Mugunjang-to (무군장도/無根場島)
- Sari-yom (사리염)
- Chi-to (지도/芝島)
- Uri-to (우리도/于里島)
- Samcha-to (삼차도)
- Rap-to (랍도/蠟島)
- Sorap-to (소랍도/小蠟島)
