= Phi Islet =

North Korean island near Nampo Dam

Coordinates: 38.681°N 125.176°E

- Hangul: 피도
- Hanja: 避島
- RR: Pido
- MR: P'ido

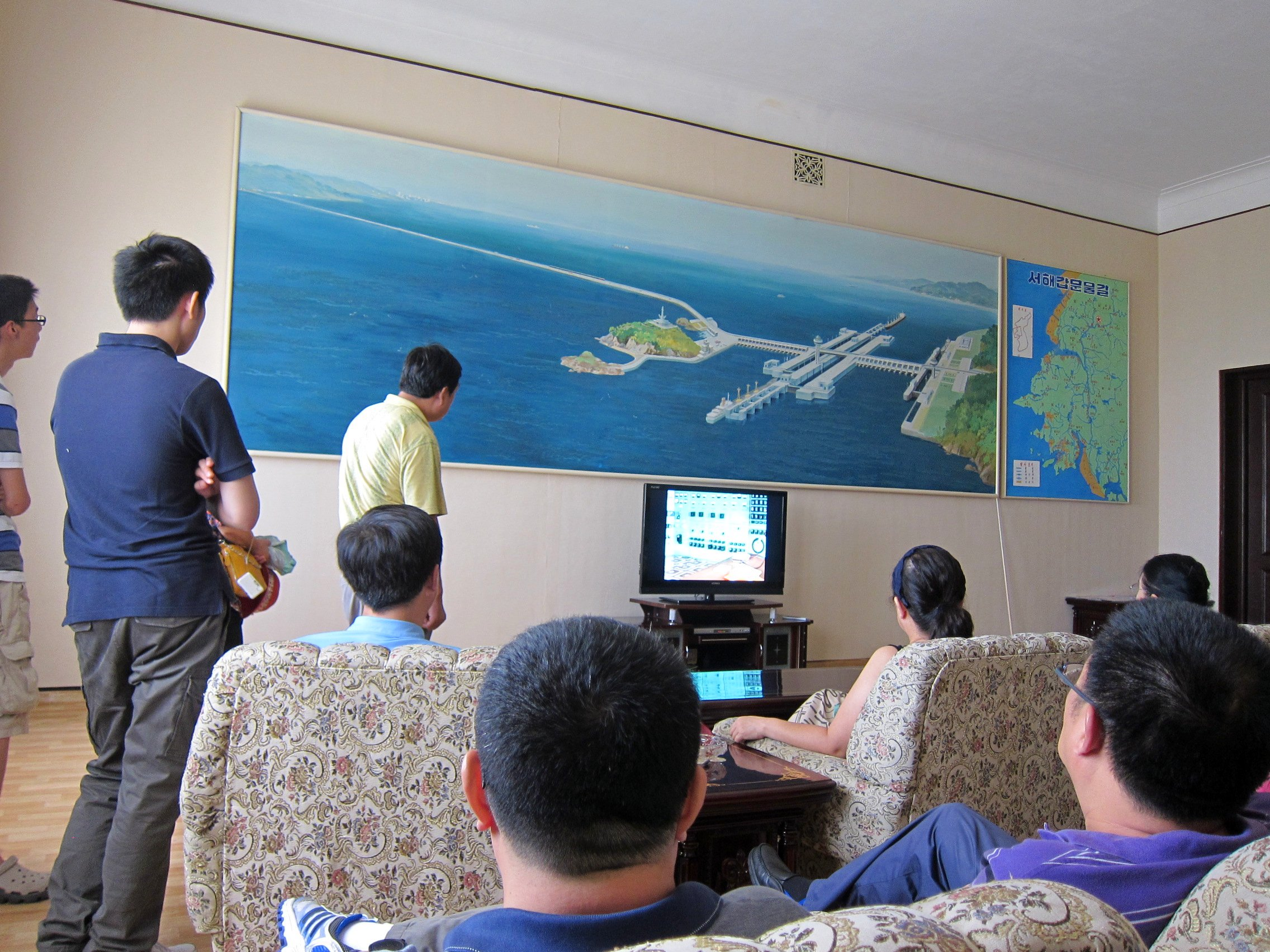
Nampo Dam visitor centre

P'i Do Island is an island in North Korea. It is home to the visitor centre of the Nampo Dam.
