= Cholsan County =

Ch'ŏlsan County 철산군
- County

Korean transcription(s)
  - Chosŏn'gŭl: 철산군
  - Hancha: 鐵山郡
  - McCune-Reischauer: Ch'ŏlsan-kun
  - Revised Romanization: Cheolsan-gun
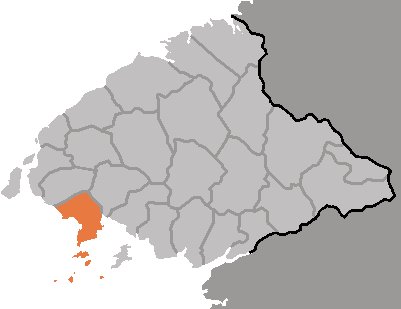
- Country: North Korea
- Province: North P'yŏngan
- Administrative divisions: 1 ŭp, 2 workers' districts, 25 ri

Area
  - Total: 361.4 km^{2} (139.5 sq mi)

Population (2008)
  - Total: 85,525
  - Density: 236.6/km^{2} (612.9/sq mi)

Ch'ŏlsan is a kun, or county, in North P'yŏngan province, North Korea. It occupies the Ch'ŏlsan Peninsula, which juts into the Yellow Sea. Ch'ŏlsan borders Yŏmju and Tongrim counties to the north, and is bounded on all other sides by water. Ch'ŏlsan is home to the Sohae Satellite Launching Station.

== Name ==
Ch'ŏlsan appears as Cheolsan in South Korea's Revised Romanization and as Tieshan in Chinese records, as during its occupation by Mao Wenlong during the Manchu conquest of China.

== Geography ==
The terrain is dominated by rolling hills, seldom exceeding 300 m; the highest peak is Yŏndaesan at 393 m. The offshore island of Kado enjoys similar terrain, with Yondaebong reaching 335 m. There are a total of 28 offshore islands, some of which are uninhabited. The coastline measure 123 kilometres in length, or 265 km if the islands are also included.

== Administrative divisions ==
Ch'ŏlsan county is divided into 1 ŭp (town), 2 rodongjagu (workers' districts) and 25 ri (villages):

- Ch'ŏlsan-ŭp (철산읍)
- Changsong-rodongjagu (장송로동자구)
- Kabong-rodongjagu (가봉로동자구)
- Haksal-li (학산리)
- Kado-ri (가도리)
- Kasal-li (가산리)
- Kibong-ri (기봉리)
- Kŏm'am-ri (검암리)
- Kŭmsal-li (금산리)
- Kŭnch'ŏl-li (근천리)
- Munbong-ri (문봉리)
- Myŏngam-ri (명암리)
- Obong-ri (오봉리)
- Posal-li (보산리)
- P'ungch'ŏl-li (풍천리)
- Rihwa-ri (리화리)
- Ryŏngsang-ri (령삭리)
- Ryŏnsu-ri (련수리)
- Sŏn'am-ri (선암리)
- Sŏngam-ri (성암리)
- Sŏnju-ri (선주리)
- Subu-ri (수부리)
- Taehwa-ri (대화리)
- Tongch'ang-ri (동창리)
- Tongch'ŏl-li (동천리)
- Tongp'yŏng-ri (동평리)
- Wŏlbong-ri (월봉리)
- Wŏnsep'yŏng-ri (원세평리)

== Climate ==
Ch'ŏlsan enjoys a relatively mild maritime climate, with the warmest winters in North P'yŏngan. The annual temperature is 8.9 °C, with a January average of -7.9 °C and an August average of 24 °C. Annual rainfall is 900 mm.

== Economy ==
46% of the county's land is occupied by forests, which are dominated by pine and oak. 40% is cultivated, with crops including rice, maize, and soybeans. Clams and fish are harvested from nearby waters.

Local tourist attractions include the Pansong archipelago, known for its scenery, and the Masŏn cavern (마선굴). The island of Wŏndo has been made into a nature preserve.

Educational institutions in Ch'ŏlsan include Ch'ŏlsan Advanced Technical School (철산고등전문학교).

== See also ==
- Geography of North Korea
- Administrative divisions of North Korea
- North Pyongan
