= Nan Do =

Island in North Korea

Coordinates: 40°39′N 129°33′E

- Hangul: 란도
- Hanja: 卵島
- RR: Rando
- MR: Rando

Nan Do or Al Som is an islet off the east coast of North Korea. It is white and barren. It lies about 11.3 miles east of Yujin Dan.

== History ==
American whaleships cruised for right whales off the islet between 1849 and 1888. They called it White Rock. Some went ashore to collect bird's eggs.

During the Korean War, the United States Eighth Army used the islet as a base for guerrilla operations off the coast of Wonsan. It served as a headquarters for some operations due to its height, which made it useful for radio frequencies. Suspicious activity from the guerrillas on the islet led the Army to shut down the base in February 1952.
