= Hwanggumpyong Island =

North Korean territory bordering China

Hwanggumpyong
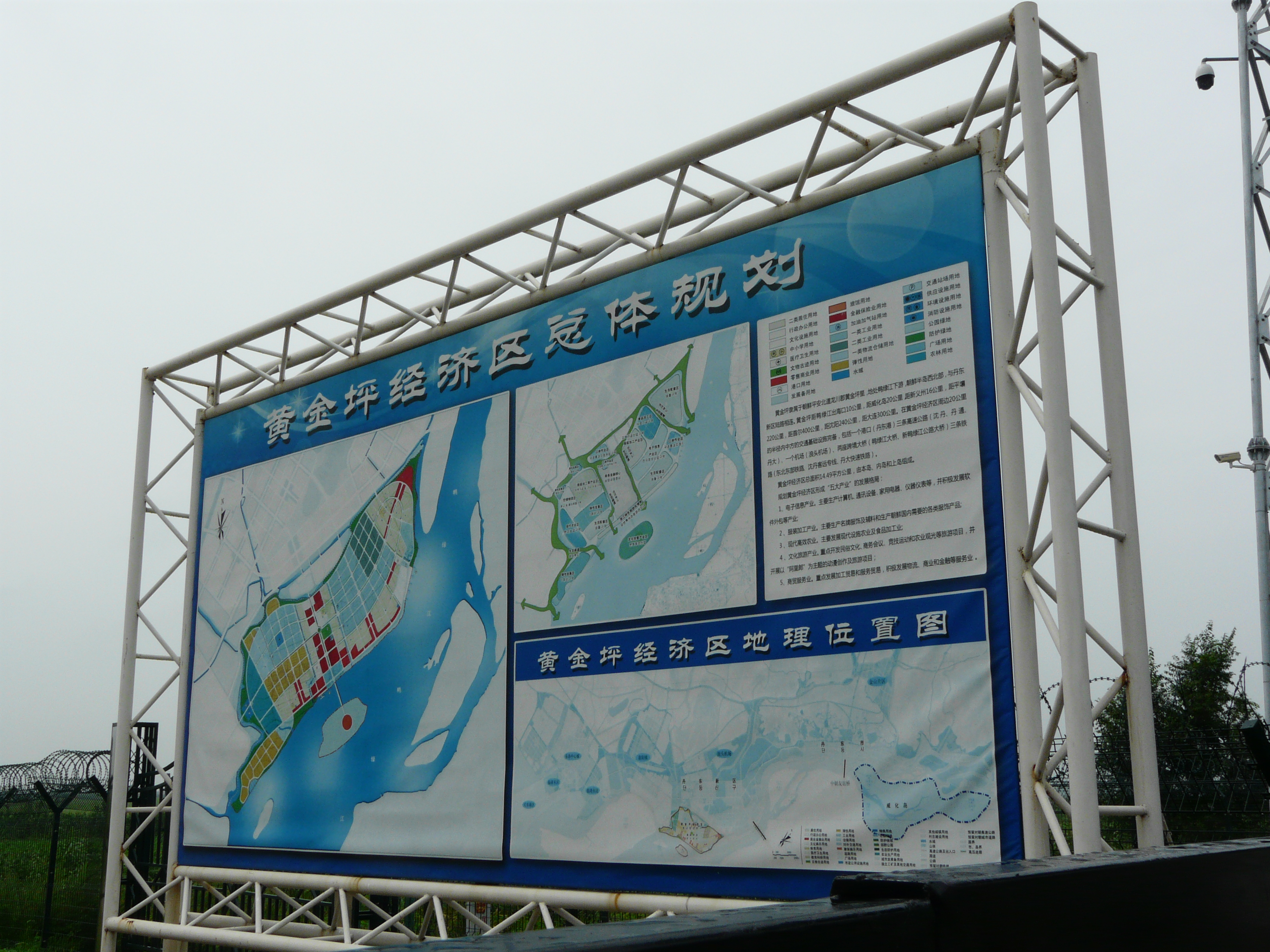
- Interactive map of Hwanggumpyong

Geography
- Location: Yalu River
- Coordinates: 39.96°N 124.31°E
- Area: 11.45 km^{2} (4.42 sq mi)

Administration
- Democratic People's Republic of Korea
- Province: North P'yŏngan
- County: Sindo County
- Republic of Korea (claimed)
- Province: North Pyeongan
- County-level division: Yongcheon
- Myeon: Sindo

Demographics
- Ethnic groups: Koreans

Hwanggumpyong (Korean: 황금평, simplified Chinese: 黄金坪; traditional Chinese: 黃金坪; pinyin: Huángjīnpíng), formerly called Hwanggumpyong Island (Korean: 황금평도, simplified Chinese: 黄金坪岛; traditional Chinese: 黃金坪島; pinyin: Huángjīnpíng Dǎo), is a North Korean free-trade zone bordering China. The area used to be a tidal island in the Yalu River. However, due to continuous deposition of river-borne sediments, the northern portion of the former island is now permanently connected with the Chinese city of Dandong. A steel mesh fence has been built to mark the land border between North Korea and China.

Due to ethnic Koreans living on the island at the time of a 1962 border treaty, both China and North Korea agreed that the sovereignty of the island belongs to North Korea. The former river island is now a North Korean exclave on the otherwise Chinese side of the river. The agreement is not recognized by South Korea, who continues to claim this island in accordance with its constitution.

== History ==
In June 2011, an agreement, negotiated by Gao Jingde, of Sunbase International Holdings Ltd, with China was made to establish a joint free-trade area on Hwanggumpyong and Wihwa Islands, as well as the Chinese border area near Dandong. By 2013, the site had been prepared, and a free-trade area of over 300 acres (120 ha) may be ready for operation in about two years.
