= Zhenzhu Subdistrict =

Zhenzhu Subdistrict 珍珠街道
- Subdistrict
- Location in Liaoning
- Coordinates: 40°9′1″N 124°24′44″E
- Country: People's Republic of China
- Province: Liaoning
- Prefecture-level city: Dandong
- District: Zhen'an District
- Time zone: UTC+8 (China Standard)

Zhenzhu Subdistrict (Chinese: 珍珠街道; pinyin: Zhēnzhū Jiēdào) is a subdistrict in Zhen'an District, Dandong, Liaoning, China. As of 2020, it administers the following four residential communities and one village:

- Dongsheng Community (东升社区)
- Linjiang Community (临江社区)
- Zhen'an Community (振安社区)
- Zhenshan Community (振山社区)
- Linjiang Village (临江村)

== See also ==
- List of township-level divisions of Liaoning
