= Zhen'an District =

Coordinates: 40°09′25″N 124°25′11″E

Zhen'an 振安区
- District
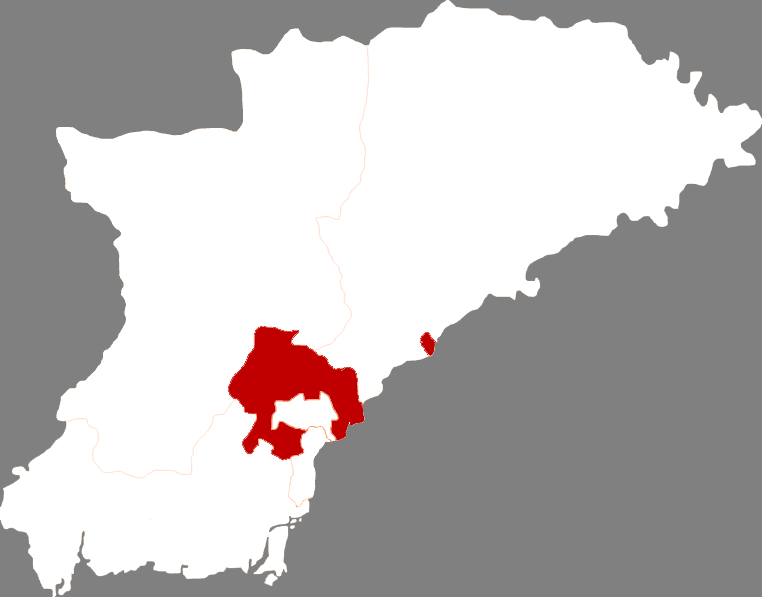
- Zhen'an in Dandong

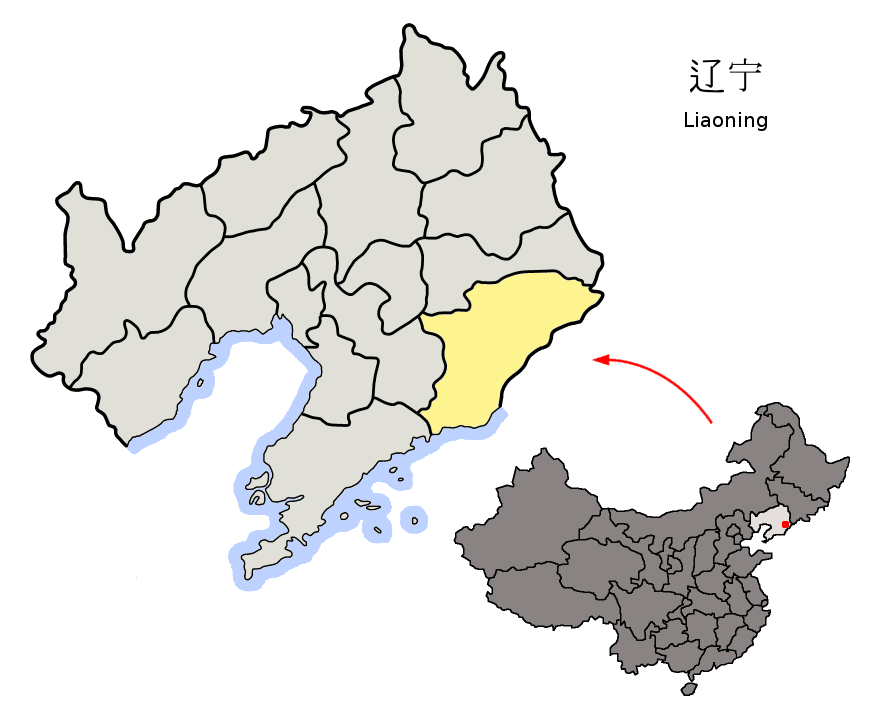
- Dandong in Liaoning
- Country: People's Republic of China
- Province: Liaoning
- Prefecture-level city: Dandong

Area
  - Total: 651.9 km^{2} (251.7 sq mi)

Population (2020 census)
  - Total: 189,995
  - Density: 291.4/km^{2} (754.8/sq mi)
- Time zone: UTC+8 (China Standard)

Zhen'an District (simplified Chinese: 振安区; traditional Chinese: 振安區; pinyin: Zhèn'ān Qū) is a district of the city of Dandong, Liaoning, People's Republic of China.

== Administrative divisions ==
There are four subdistricts and five towns in the district. Taiping Bay Subdistrict (太平湾街道) is an exclave.

Subdistricts:

- Yalu River Subdistrict (鸭绿江街道), Zhenzhu Subdistrict (珍珠街道), Taiping Bay Subdistrict (太平湾街道), Jinkuang Subdistrict (金矿街道)

Towns:

- Wulongbei (五龙背镇), Loufang (楼房镇), Tangshancheng (汤山城镇), Tongxing (同兴镇), Jiuliancheng (九连城镇)
