= Sino-Korean Border Agreement =

1962, 1964 China–North Korea agreements

Boundary Agreement Between the People's Republic of China and the Democratic People's Republic of Korea
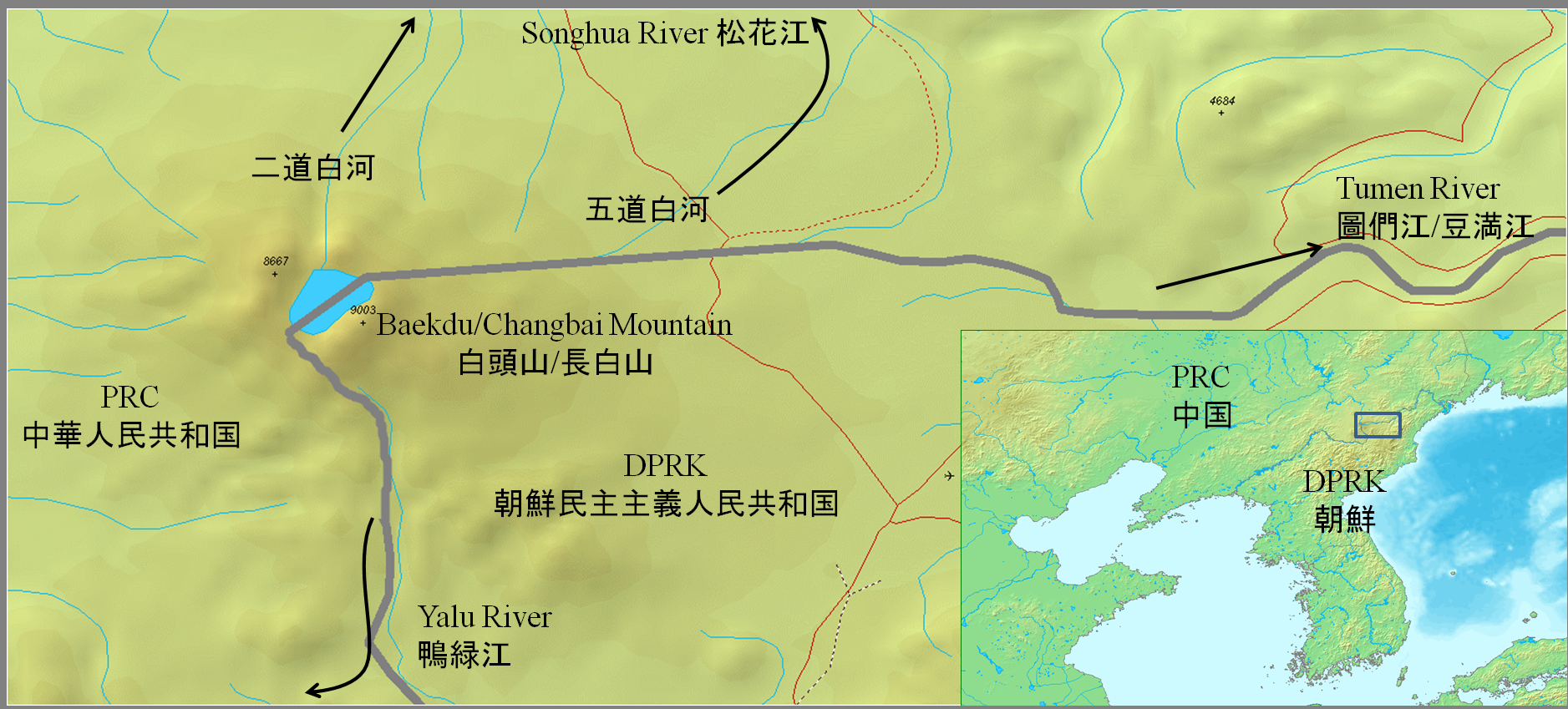
- The border after the agreement, with emphasis on Mount Paektu
- Type: National boundary delimitation
- Signed: October 12, 1962
- Location: Pyongyang, North Korea
- Negotiators: Ji Pengfei; Ryu Jang-sik
- Signatories: Zhou Enlai; Kim Il Sung
- Parties: China; North Korea
- Languages: Chinese; Korean

Full text at Wikisource
- zh:中华人民共和国和朝鲜民主主义人民共和国边界条约; zh:中华人民共和国政府和朝鲜民主主义人民共和国政府关于中朝边界的议定书

Sino-Korean Border Agreement

Chinese name
- Simplified Chinese: 中华人民共和国和朝鲜民主主义人民共和国边界条约
- Traditional Chinese: 中華人民共和國和朝鮮民主主義人民共和國邊界條約
Transcriptions
Standard Mandarin
- Hanyu Pinyin: Zhōnghuá rénmín gònghéguó hé cháoxiǎn mínzhǔ zhǔyì rénmín gònghéguó biānjiè tiáoyuē

Korean name
- Chosŏn'gŭl: 조선민주주의인민공화국과 중화인민공화국 국경조약
- Hancha: 朝鮮民主主義人民共和國과 中華人民共和國 國境條約
Transcriptions
- Revised Romanization: Joseonminjujuuiinmingonghwagukgwa Junghwainmingonghwagung Gukgyeongjoyak
- McCune–Reischauer: Chosŏnminjujuŭiinmin'gonghwagukkwa Chunghwainmin'gonghwagung Kukkyŏngjoyak

The Sino-Korean Border Agreement (Chinese: 中朝边界条约; Korean: 조중 변계 조약) (Note: Shortened titles commonly used. Note that in Chinese, China's name comes first while in Korean, North Korea's name is first. South Korea uses the North Korean ordering as well.) was signed by China and North Korea on October 12, 1962, in Pyongyang. This agreement and a subsequent agreement in 1964 define the modern border between the two countries. The agreement is widely viewed by both modern scholars and by contemporaries as being favorable to North Korea. As a result of the agreement, North Korea acquired 280 km^{2} of territory on and around Paektu Mountain, and 54.5% of the mountain's Heaven Lake. The previous practice of using the Yalu River and Tumen River for the rest of the border was affirmed.

A subsequent agreement followed on March 20, 1964, called the Protocols on the Sino-Korean Border (Chinese: 中朝边界议定书; Korean: 조중 변계 의정서). It was signed in Beijing and determined the sovereignty of 451 islands and islets (264 to North Korea, 187 to China).

Both agreements were made in secret, never registered with the United Nations Secretariat, and never publicly confirmed. However, in 2000, the South Korean newspaper JoongAng Ilbo published leaked copies of the Chinese version of both agreements that are considered by scholars to likely be authentic.

The legality of the 1962 and 1964 agreements are studied in South Korea. Of particular interest is the legal status of the agreements if Korean reunification occurred and also whether a unified Korea may have a basis for claiming Jiandao (called Gando in Korean), an area ceded to China that roughly corresponds to the current Yanbian Korean Autonomous Prefecture. Most legal scholars agree that a unified Korea should attempt to uphold the legitimacy of the agreements and that it is likely China will try to renegotiate the border.

== Background ==
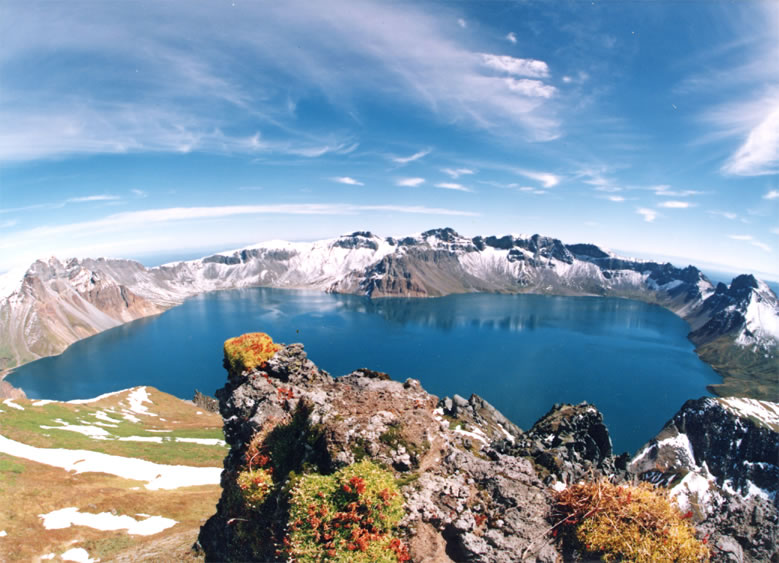
Heaven Lake

The border between China and Korea has been a contentious issue since antiquity. Although the practice of using the Yalu and Tumen rivers as the border became largely established by the 15th century, the rivers' changing locations and ambiguous status especially near their origins on Paektu Mountain provided an enduring source of friction. In addition, Korea's view of Paektu Mountain and its Heaven Lake as its mythic ancestral homeland, first attested to around three centuries ago, has further invigorated the conflict.

In 1909, the Gando Convention between the Empire of Japan and Qing China saw Korea, Japan's then-protectorate, cede Jiandao and Paektu Mountain to China.

=== After World War II ===
After the surrender of Japan in 1945, however, the legitimacy of the Gando Convention was called into question by the Korean side. Meanwhile, the new Communist government in China adopted a policy of maintaining the status quo regarding its borders, although it began preparing for renegotiations. However, from the mid-1950s, China experienced numerous border disputes with its neighbors, including but not limited to Burma, the Soviet Union, Pakistan, and India.

North Korea and China's relationship around the time also impacted the agreement. Their relationship somewhat cooled during the mid-1950s. This culminated in the 1956 August Faction Incident, in which pro-China and pro-Soviet North Koreans had attempted but failed to remove Kim Il Sung from power, and were subsequently expelled from the country. Despite this, China adopted a conciliatory stance towards North Korea in order to improve their ties and counter the Soviet Union. For example, during Kim's visit to China in November 1958, Chairman of the Chinese Communist Party Mao Zedong told Kim that historically, "China did not treat Korea well. [...] Your ancestors said that you bordered the Liao River, but you [have] been squeezed to the other side of the Yalu River." As another example, in spring 1961, North Korea allegedly assisted a large number of ethnic Koreans in illegally crossing the border from China to North Korea. The Chinese Ministry of Foreign Affairs (MFA) took a permissive stance, citing the need to maintain their positive relationship, and encouraged Ambassador Qiao Xiaoguang to not "overreact" to the incident.

Between 1956 and 1960, China and North Korea signed a number of other agreements related to the border, including agreements on trade, water, fishing, and navigation of vessels on border rivers.

== Creation ==
=== Preparations ===
On April 25, 1958, the Chinese MFA notified the country's border provinces and autonomous regions that they had begun making efforts to resolve border disputes with neighboring countries. However, their efforts ended up being delayed due to domestic turmoil caused by the failed 1958 Great Leap Forward, clashes on the Indian border in 1959, and cooling relations with the Soviet Union around the time of the Sino-Soviet split.

Meanwhile, the local governments of Liaoning and Jilin provinces were instructed to research the Sino-Korean border. They produced two reports, one in January and one in December 1959. In March 1960, the Chinese State Council agreed to Jilin's proposal, that the center line of the Yalu River be the border between the province and Korea. Shen Zhihua and Xia Yafeng speculate that the Central Committee did not anticipate border conflicts with China's socialist neighbors to be particularly contentious, as it did not provide its local governments with many historical materials or instructions to manage the conflicts.

On the other hand, North Korea began preparing vigorously for the negotiations. It sent a number of scholars and archaeologists into the border region to investigate its history and build a historical case for Korean claims. According to a March 14, 1960 State Council document, North Korea constructed highways and houses in contested areas on Paektu Mountain. Kim initially asked for Ji'an, Jilin in addition to Paektu, as Ji'an had once been the capital of Goguryeo. Mao denied this request, and instructed Chinese Premier Zhou Enlai to make some concession on Paektu. According to a 2006 speech Hwang Jang-yop made after he defected to South Korea, Zhou first suggested to Kim Il Sung that they split Heaven Lake in half, around 1958.

In July 1961, Zhou and Kim met and discussed the border, with Zhou acknowledging the issue was contentious. On February 18, 1962, North Korean foreign minister Pak Song-chol invited ambassador Hao Deqing on a hunting trip, in which he asked to discuss the border dispute. Ten days after the trip, the Chinese MFA agreed to the request. On March 26, Pak proposed that each side send vice foreign ministers on April 10 to plan the negotiations. On March 30, Zhou called a meeting to plan resolutions to the Sino-Korean and Sino-Mongolian border disputes.

=== Negotiations and signing ===
The first round of negotiations was held from April 10 to 14, 1962, in Andong Province, China. Ji Pengfei led the Chinese delegation and Ryu Jang-sik (류장식) the North Korean. They held five talks in this round. Shen and Xia speculate that North Korea asked for full ownership over Heaven Lake on Paektu Mountain, and that Chinese negotiations were hampered due to their lack of historical records. They argue this because there is a record of the Chinese MFA requesting documents on the lake around this time but receiving nothing in return. In addition, on April 18, Hao met with Pak and proposed postponing negotiations, as they were dissatisfied with the Korean proposal. Pak agreed to the request.

Over the following months, Zhou met with both Chinese and North Korean officials on a number of occasions to gauge their opinions on the border. On June 28, Zhou met with head of the Supreme People's Assembly Pak Kum-chol and ambassador Han Ik-su. (Note: Shen and Xia write "Pak Kim-cheol", but this is likely a typo, as no significant North Korean politicians named 박김철 seem to exist.) Shen and Xia speculate that Zhou explained China's plan for the border during this meeting.

On September 15, Ryu notified Hao that North Korea consented to a proposal from China. They then held a second round of talks that ended on October 3, in which both countries negotiated details of the upcoming agreement. This meeting is mentioned on the final section of the leaked agreement itself. On October 11, Zhou and Chen Yi visited Pyongyang to meet with Kim Il Sung. The next day, they signed the agreement. On November 7, both North Korea's Supreme People's Assembly and China's National People's Congress approved the agreement.

== Contents of agreements ==
=== Leak of agreements ===
The negotiation process and content of the agreement are not known with certainty due to a lack of publicly available documentation. Neither agreement was registered with the United Nations Secretariat.

Until the mid-1990s, the existence of the agreement was the subject of rumors and skepticism. However, opinions shifted after both Chen Yi's 1995 memoirs and Zhou Enlai's 1997 memoirs affirmed the existence of the agreement. (Note: Chronicle of Chen Yi (陈毅年谱; Chén Yì niánpǔ) and Chronicle of Zhou Enlai (周恩来年谱; Zhōu Ēnlái niánpǔ))

On October 20, 1999, the CEO of the Baekdu Institute of Cultural Heritage Lee Hyeong-seok (이형석; 李炯石) from South Korea announced that he had been shown a copy of the agreement that summer by Yanbian University officials, and said North Korea owned 60% of Heaven Lake. On October 16, 2000, the South Korean newspaper JoongAng Ilbo published a report saying that they had purchased a collection of agreements compiled in 1975 by the Foreign Affairs Office of Jilin province. The collection included 461 pages of documents, of which 360 were related to North Korea and China. This allegedly included the minutes of several October 1962 discussions and the texts of the 1962 and 1964 agreements in Chinese. Shen and Xia conducted an analysis of the materials, matching publicly available information to the leaked materials, and concluded that they were authentic.

Many scholars speculate that China did not publish the text of the agreement because it did not wish to publicize how much it conceded to North Korea. Shen and Xia even suggest the publication of the agreement could threaten the domestic credibility of the Chinese government.

=== 1962 agreement ===
According to the leaked text, the agreement consists of five sections that cover these topics:

1. Territorial distribution of Paektu Mountain and Heaven Lake
2. General principles of how to determine ownership of islands and sandbars along the Yalu and Tumen rivers
3. Maritime rights on seas and rivers
4. The establishment and duties of a joint border commission in order to determine ownership of other islands and sandbars
5. Legal aspects of the agreement, including upcoming ratification and validity of translations in both Chinese and Korean

Notably, North Korea acquired the highest peak of Paektu, which is known in North Korea as Janggun Peak. (Note: North Korean name: 장군봉; 將軍峰, South Korean name: 백두봉; 白头峰; lit. Baekdu Peak, Chinese name: 将军峰; Jiāngjūn fēng. The Chinese name uses the same Chinese characters as the North Korean name.) Also, Heaven Lake atop Paektu Mountain would be divided roughly in half, with North Korea acquiring 54.5% and China 45.5%. China would acquire the northwest half and North Korea the southwest. The source of the Tumen river was defined as the Hongto River on Paektu. Sources vary on estimates of how much territory China lost due to this redefinition, with figures ranging from 280 km^{2} (110 sq mi) or 260 km^{2} (100 sq mi), to 500 km^{2} (190 sq mi). However, using the two rivers as the border effectively ceded the Jiandao region to China, to the later frustration of some modern South Koreans. For maritime rights, both countries were to share use of the border rivers.

The status of the islands and sandbars of the Yalu and Tumen were left to be confirmed after the joint border commission finished its investigation.

=== 1964 agreement ===
The border commission met for the first time in January 1963. It conducted its investigation between May 13 and November 15, 1963, establishing boundary markers and assigning ownership of islands according to the principles established in the 1962 agreement. They also placed border markers on Paektu Mountain in order to handle the remaining ambiguities about the rivers' locations.

These efforts led to the March 20, 1964, Protocols on the Sino-Korean Border, signed in Beijing by Chen and Pak.

According to the leaked text, the Protocols consist of 21 articles that cover a range of topics, including:

- General provisions, including the design and placement of border markers and expanded principles of island and sandbar distribution (articles 1–6)
- Description of placement of border markers on Paektu Mountain (articles 7 and 8)
- Confirmation of distribution of 451 islands, including 264 to North Korea and 187 to China (article 9)
- Maritime exclusive economic zones and free-travel zones (articles 12 and 13)
- Management and maintenance of the border (articles 14–19)

They divided Heaven Lake using a straight line defined by two border markers: numbers 5 and 6. Of the islands distributed, 205 were on the Yalu and 246 on the Tumen. 127 of the Yalu islands and 137 of the Tumen islands went to North Korea. They also clarified that the borders and ownership of islands would not change, even if the river changed course or the islands disappeared.

== Aftermath ==
On June 28, 1963, at a meeting with a North Korean Academy of Sciences delegation, Zhou reportedly said:

Unearthed artifacts have proven that the Korean people lived in the Liao River and Songhua River valley for a very long period of time. We can still find historical sites of Bohai (Balhae) near the Jingpo Lake area. [...] Ancient Chinese dynasties invaded Korea [...] We should apologize to you on behalf of our ancestors. [...] [We should] not distort history. It is a falsehood to say that west of the Tumen and Yalu rivers has always been Chinese territory, and that Korea has been a vassal state of China since ancient times

Mao reportedly reaffirmed the above ideas on October 7, 1964.

North Korean officials reportedly expressed satisfaction with the agreement on a number of occasions afterwards. The agreement was seen by its contemporaries and by modern scholars to be a major concession to North Korea. Still, North Korea sought confirmation on several occasions of China's commitment to the new borders. In response, in early May 1964, the Chinese MFA published two directives affirming the borders and in January 1965 prohibited the sale of maps that used the previous borders.

=== Later disputes ===
However, in 1965, China may have demanded 160 km^{2} (62 sq mi) of territory on Paektu Mountain during a cool period in their relationship, leading to a series of skirmishes in 1968 and 1969. China abandoned this request in 1970.

The South Korean response was minimal for decades due to the secrecy of the agreement. On September 16, 1983, fifty-five members of the South Korean National Assembly submitted a resolution claiming sovereignty over the entirety of Heaven Lake.

In 2002, China launched the Northeast Asian History Project ("Northeast Project"), with the goal of publishing academic research on territorial claims in northeast China that they claimed were "distorted by some other countries' institutions and scholars". This drew widespread criticism from both North and South Korea and unprecedented cooperation to counter the Project's research. The DPRK called it "a pathetic attempt to manipulate history for [China's] own interests". In 2005, both Koreas sent scholars to Paektu to investigate Chinese claims that the 1712 border marker on the mountain was 20 km (12 mi) south of Heaven Lake. The scholars disputed the claim, and said they found remains of the Mukedeng Stele that marked the border only 4 km (2.5 mi) southeast of the lake.

China also launched a "Mt. Changbai Culture" (长白山文化; Zhǎngbáishān wénhuà) campaign, where "Changbai" is the Chinese name for Paektu, that aimed to encourage the perception that Paektu was a key cultural aspect of Chinese culture. The campaign involved the prohibition of signage, maps, and commercial projects that used the "Paektu" name. It also involved a further push to assimilate ethnic Koreans in northeast China.

According to Kwon and Kim in 2019, South Korea has since been careful to avoid having the agreements affect their immediate relationship with China.

== Legal analysis ==
In recent years, legal scholars have analyzed the legal basis of both the 1962 and 1964 agreements. In particular, scholars have analyzed the agreement in relation to the Vienna Convention on Succession of States in Respect of Treaties, to determine whether a unified Korea would inherit the agreements. Many studies also investigate the agreements' relation to a potential future claim to Jiandao. A relevant area of concern is how each Korea views the legitimacy of its counterpart; if South Korea rejects the statehood of North Korea, then North Korea would have no legal basis to form agreements. This is also made more complicated by the lack of relevant official publications.

Almost all studies of the topic agree that the legality of succession would depend on the specifics of how North and South Korea merge, with possibilities including absorption, annexation, or a merger between the two states.

In 2007, Lee Hyun-jo argued that both agreements were legitimate because North Korea was functionally a state by most sets of criteria, including the Montevideo Convention, and because South Korea and the rest of the world functionally recognized it as such. Even further, he argued that historically negotiations around border succession tended to prioritize stability and thus encourage the direct inheritance of borders and not border agreements, thus the legality of the agreements may not even matter. Lee analyzed the scenarios of absorption and merging. In both cases he argued stability of borders would be a strong argument, although he acknowledged the Saudi-Yemeni territorial disputes after the Yemeni unification and the possibility of China demanding territory back in the absorption scenario. For the Jiandao issue, the assumption of stability of borders would make claims to it unlikely to be realized.

In 2010, Lee Keun-gwan argued that a unified Korea would have automatic succession of both agreements. An analysis by Song Byoung-jin in 2014 concluded that the possibility of inheritance of both land and maritime borders was uncertain, and that renegotiation seemed the likely outcome.

In 2019, Katy Kwon and Pil Ho Kim argued that China would be highly likely to push for renegotiation, as any perceived concession by China could undermine Chinese efforts to assimilate its ethnic Koreans, and because China now has a much stronger geopolitical position. They noted that in 2018, General Secretary of the Chinese Communist Party Xi Jinping stated that it would be "absolutely impossible to separate any inch of our great country's territory from China".

== See also ==
- Sino-North Korean Treaty of Friendship, Co-operation, and Mutual Assistance
- China–North Korea relations
- China–South Korea relations
- Territorial disputes of the People's Republic of China

== Notes and references ==
=== Sources ===
==== In English ====
- Lu, Xiaoxian (September 2021), "My Love from the Mountain: Contingent bordering processes at Mount Changbai/Baekdu", Area, 53 (3): 511–520, Bibcode:2021Area...53..511L, doi:10.1111/area.12706
- Shen, Zhihua; Xia, Yafeng (2013), "Contested Border: A Historical Investigation into the Sino-Korean Border Issue, 1950–1964", Asian Perspective, 37 (1), Johns Hopkins University Press: 1–30, doi:10.1353/apr.2013.0002, JSTOR 42704816

==== In Korean ====
- Lee, Keun-gwan (2010), 통일 후 한-중 국경 문제에 관한 국제법적 고찰 [The Boundary between Unified Korea and China from International Law Perspective], 국제법학회논총 (The Korean Journal of International Law) (in Korean), vol. 55, no. 4, pp. 117–144
- Loh, Yeong-Don (September 15, 2018), 간도영유권문제와 <조중 변계조약>의 의미 [The Point Issues of the Territorial Sovereignty over Gando and the Meaning of Border Treaty between North Korea and China of 1962], Journal of Military History (in Korean), vol. 108, Military History Institute, MND, pp. 235–270
- Lee, Hyun-jo (2007), 조중국경조약체제에 관한 국제법적 고찰 [A Study on the National Border Treaty Regime between North Korea and China in International Law], 국제법학회논총 (The Korean Journal of International Law) (in Korean), vol. 52, no. 3, pp. 177–202
- Song, Byoung-jin (2014), 북중국경조약과 해양경계획정협정의 승계 문제 [The Succession Problem of North Korea-China Border Treaty and Maritime Boundary Agreement], 외법논집 (HUFS Law Review) (in Korean), vol. 38, pp. 23–44
