= Port of Dandong =

Coordinates: 39°50′24″N 124°07′18″E

Port of Dandong 丹东港
- Interactive map of Port of Dandong 丹东港

Location
- Country: People's Republic of China
- Location: Dandong, Liaoning Province

Details
- Owned by: People's Republic of China
- Type of harbour: Artificial Deep-water Seaport
- No. of berths: 50 （2012）

Statistics
- Annual cargo tonnage: 96,060,000 metric tons/year （2012）
- Annual container volume: 125,000 TEU （2012）
- Website; Port of Dandong website

The Port of Dandong is an artificial deep-water seaport on the coast of the city of Dandong, Liaoning Province, People's Republic of China, located at the mouth of the Yalu River, right on the Chinese border with North Korea. It has capacity for very large ships of up to 300,000 DWT. In 2012 it reached a throughput of 96 million metric tons and 125,000 TEU of containers.
