= Sindo County =

Coordinates: 39°48′11″N 124°13′46″E

Sindo County 신도군
- County

Korean transcription(s)
  - Chosŏn'gŭl: 신도군
  - Hancha: 薪島郡
  - McCune-Reischauer: Sindo-gun
  - Revised Romanization: Sindo-gun
- Country: North Korea
- Province: North P'yŏngan
- Administrative divisions: 1 ŭp, 2 workers' districts, 1 ri

Area
  - Total: 70.7 km^{2} (27.3 sq mi)

Population (2008)
  - Total: 11,810
  - Density: 167/km^{2} (433/sq mi)

Sindo is a kun (county) in the North P'yŏngan province of North Korea. Most of the county consists of Pidansŏm, an island in the estuary of the Yalu River. Sindo was established as a separate county in 1991; previously, it had been part of Ryongch'ŏn, although it had enjoyed a brief existence as a separate county in 1967.

== Geography ==
Lying in the northwest corner of North Korea, Sindo borders the People's Republic of China to the north and west, and faces the Yellow Sea to the south; to the east, it looks across a narrow expanse of sea at Ryongch'ŏn. Much of the county's land has been reclaimed through draining and filling. There are various islands offshore, and together with the Sindo archipelago make up the kun. The island of Pidansŏm is the westernmost point in Korea; it was formed by a 1958 reclamation project from several smaller islands. Other islands include Hwanggumpyong, Ssarisŏm, Kanŭnsŏm, Munbakto, and Wihwa. There are various alluvial plains and extensive reed fields.

== Administrative divisions ==
Sindo county is divided into 1 ŭp (town), 2 rodongjagu (workers' districts) and 1 ri (village):

- Sindo-ŭp (신도읍/薪島邑)
- Pidansŏm-rodongjagu (비단섬 로동자구/緋緞島 勞動者區)
- Sŏho-rodongjagu (서호 로동자구/西湖 勞動者區)
- Hwanggŭmp'yŏng-ri (황금평리/黃金坪里)

== Economy ==
Reeds are the chief local crop, but fisheries and farming also play an important role in the local economy. The reeds produced in the county are shipped to the chemical-textile factory in Sinŭiju. Oysters are gathered in abundance, and there are numerous fish resources as well.

Sindo County is home to the island of Hwangkumpyong. In 2011, China and North Korea agreed to develop Hwangkumpyong as a special economic zone, though the project stalled following the execution of Jang Song-thaek in 2013.

== Transportation ==
There are no railroads in Sindo, and roads are minimal. However, there is a bus connecting central Sindo to Pidan Harbour, and boats provide transportation to Sinŭiju and nearby Ryongamp'o workers' districts.

== See also ==
- Geography of North Korea
- Administrative divisions of North Korea
- North Pyongan
