= Korea Bay =

Bight in the Yellow Sea

Coordinates: 39°N 124°E

Korea(n) Bay West Korea(n) Bay
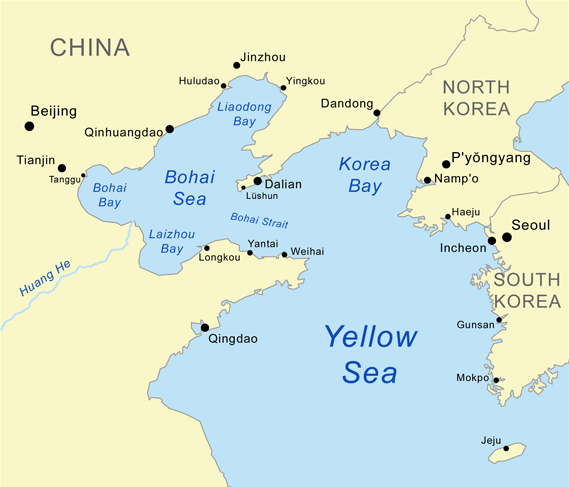
- Map showing Korea(n) Bay
- Simplified Chinese: 西朝鲜湾
- Traditional Chinese: 西朝鮮灣
Transcriptions
Standard Mandarin
- Hanyu Pinyin: Xīcháoxiǎnwān

North Korean name
- Chosŏn'gŭl: 서조선만
- Hancha: 西朝鮮灣
Transcriptions
- Revised Romanization: Seojoseonman
- McCune–Reischauer: Sŏjosŏnman

South Korean name
- Hangul: 서한만
- Hanja: 西韓灣
Transcriptions
- Revised Romanization: Seohanman
- McCune–Reischauer: Sŏhanman

Korea(n) Bay, sometimes West Korea(n) Bay (simplified Chinese: 西朝鲜湾; traditional Chinese: 西朝鮮灣; pinyin: Xīcháoxiǎnwān; Korean: 서조선만 or 서한만; Hanja: 西朝鮮灣 or 西韓灣; Korean pronunciation: [sʰʌdʑosʰʌn.man] or [sʰʌhan.man]), is a bight and the northern extension of the Yellow Sea, between the southeastern coastline of China's Liaoning Province and the western coastline of North Korea's North Pyongan, South Pyongan and South Hwanghae provinces. It is separated from the Bohai Sea by the Liaodong Peninsula, with Dalian's Lüshunkou District marking its western end, and westernmost tip of North Korea's Ryongyon County as its eastern end.

The Yalu (Amnok) River, which marks the western two-thirds of the China–North Korea border, empties into the Korea Bay between Dandong (China) and Sinŭiju (North Korea). The Chongchon River and Taedong River also drains into the Korea Bay at Sinanju and Nampo, respectively.
