= Ryohyon station =

Railway station in North Korea

Coordinates: 38.0081°N 126.4393°E

Ryŏhyŏn 려현

Korean name
- Hangul: 려현역
- Hanja: 礪峴驛
- Revised Romanization: Yeohyeon-yeok
- McCune–Reischauer: Ryŏhyŏn-yŏk

General information
- Location: Ryŏhyŏl-li, Kaepung-guyok, Kaesong; North Korea
- Owner: Korean State Railway

History
- Opened: 1 July 1923

Services
Preceding station	Korean State Railway	Following station
Kyejŏng towards P'yŏngyang	P'yŏngbu Line	Kaep'ung towards Kaesŏng
Location

Ryŏhyŏn station is a railway station located in Ryŏhyŏl-li, Kaepung-guyok, Kaesong city, North Korea. It is located on the P'yŏngbu Line, which was formed from part of the Kyŏngŭi Line to accommodate the shift of the capital from Seoul to P'yŏngyang. Though this line physically connects P'yŏngyang to Pusan via Dorasan, in operational reality it ends at Kaesŏng due to the Korean Demilitarized Zone.
