= Kaepung-guyok =

Kaepung-guyok 개풍구역
- Ward

Korean transcription(s)
  - Hanja: 開豊區域
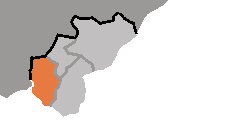
- Map of North Kaesong city showing the location of Kaepung-guyok
- Country: North Korea
- Special city: Kaesŏng-T'ŭkpyŏlsi
- Administrative divisions: 2 tong, 14 ri

Kaep'ung-guyŏk is a district of Kaesong Special city in North Korea. Formerly part of the Kaesong urban area, the county was merged with North Hwanghae when Kaesong was demoted in 2003. However, it was returned to Kaesong Special City in October 2019.

The area is the site of the royal tombs of King Kongmin and King Taejo of the Goryeo dynasty. Actor O Yeong-su, who played Oh Il-nam in the television series Squid Game, was born here in 1944 when the county of Kaepung was in Keiki-dō, during Korea under Japanese rule.

== Administrative divisions ==
The county is divided into 2 tong (neighbourhoods) and 14 ri (villages).

- Kaep'ung 1-tong
  (개풍1동/開豊1洞)
- Kaep'ung 2-tong
  (개풍2동/開豊2洞)
- Konam-ri
  (고남리/古南里)
- Kwangsu-ri
  (광수리/光水里)
- Namp'o-ri
  (남포리/南浦里)
- Ryŏhyŏl-li
  (려현리/礪峴里)
- Muksal-li
  (묵산리/墨山里)
- Muksong-ri
  (묵송리/墨松里)
- Sinsŏ-ri
  (신서리/新西里)
- Sinsŏng-ri
  (신성리/新聖里)
- Yŏngang-ri
  (연강리/延江里)
- Osal-li
  (오산리/五山里)
- P'ungdŏng-ri
  (풍덕리/豊德里)
- Haep'yŏng-ri
  (해평리/海坪里)
- Ŭip'o-ri
  (의포리/義浦里)
- Oksal-li
  (옥산리/玉山里)

== Transport ==
Kaep'ung is served by Kaep'ung and Ryohyŏn stations of the Korean State Railway. These are both on the P'yŏngbu line.

== See also ==
- Geography of North Korea
- Administrative divisions of North Korea
