= Kaesong station =

Railway station in North Korea

Kaesŏng 개성
- View of Kaesŏng station (in October 2015)

Korean name
- Hangul: 개성역
- Hanja: 開城驛
- Revised Romanization: Gaeseong-yeok
- McCune–Reischauer: Kaesŏng-yŏk

General information
- Location: Ryongsan-dong, Kaesŏng-t'ŭkkŭpsi, North Hwanghae Province; North Korea
- Coordinates: 37°58′8″N 126°32′29″E
- Owner: Korean State Railway
- Platforms: 2
- Tracks: 2 (1 not in use due to DMZ)

History
- Opened: 1 April 1908
- Rebuilt: 2003
- Former names: Kaijō

Services
Preceding station	Korean State Railway	Following station
Kaep'ung towards P'yŏngyang	P'yŏngbu Line Not in regular service	Sonha towards Dorasan (ROK)
Kaep'ung towards P'yŏngyang	P'yŏngbu Line	Terminus
Location

Kaesŏng station is a railway station located in Kaesŏng, North Korea. It is located on the P'yŏngbu Line, which was formed from part of the Kyŏngŭi Line to accommodate the shift of the capital from Seoul to P'yŏngyang; though this line physically connects P'yŏngyang to Pusan via Dorasan, in operational reality trains terminate here due to the Korean Demilitarized Zone.

== History ==
The station was opened to passenger and freight service on 1 April 1908 as Kaijō station, although the line itself was completed and opened on 3 April 1906. The original building, completed in 1919, was a Western-style brick edifice; this was destroyed during the Korean War and was subsequently replaced after the war with a concrete structure. The station was again rebuilt in 2003, using funds donated by the South Korean government under the Sunshine Policy.

On 14 June 2003, the section from Kaesŏng to P'anmun and across the DMZ to Dorasan was refurbished, and a special train inaugurating the reopened line ran on 17 May 2007. Trains across the border between South Korea and the Kaesŏng Industrial Region, operated by Korail (South Korea's national railway company), exist for freight and for South Korean workers, with the first scheduled freight train having made its run on 11 December 2007; this has been interrupted several times as a result of political events between North and South that have caused the closure of the industrial district. The industrial district was reopened on 16 September 2013 after a five-month shutdown.

Regular freight service operates from Kaesŏng north. Several passenger trains are scheduled to serve Kaesŏng (semi-express trains 142-143/144-145 between Sinŭiju Ch'ŏngnyŏn and Kaesŏng, and local trains 222-223/224 between Kalli and Kaesŏng, both via P'yŏngyang), but these have reportedly been suspended since 2008.
