= 4 June Rolling Stock Works =

North Korean railway rolling stock manufacturer

- Native name: 6·4차량종합기업소
- Romanized name: 6.4 Ch'aryang Chonghap Kiŏpso
- Company type: State-owned company
- Industry: Railway
- Founded: 15 June 1957
- Headquarters: Wŏnsan, North Korea

The 4 June Rolling Stock Works (Korean: 6·4차량종합기업소, 6.4 Ch'aryang Chonghap Kiŏpso) is a manufacturer of railway rolling stock in Wŏnsan, North Korea. It is a subordinate division of the DPRK Ministry of Railways. The plant covers an area of 640,000 m^{2} (6,900,000 sq ft), of which 180,000 m^{2} (1,900,000 sq ft), and employs 6,000 workers. It is capable of producing 3,000 new freight cars per year, as well as repairing 200 steam locomotives and 130 buses.

The plant was originally built in the colonial era, specialising in the production of parts for rolling stock and undertaking minor locomotive repairs. It was destroyed during the Korean War and was repaired and expanded with Polish assistance after the Korean Armistice Agreement, becoming operational, producing 30-ton freight cars, on 15 June 1957. The first trial of an all-steel gondola of 60 tons capacity took place in 1959, with mass production of the design commencing in 1966. Production of the Type 551 boxcar began on 10 May 1963, and in 1982, a new four-bogie gondola of 100 tons capacity (Mu12 class, Korean State Railway 48000-series) and cleared for 90 km/h service, was introduced, entering production in 1987. A covered hopper of 60 ton capacity (Se3, KSR 18000-series) has been produced since 1991.

== See also ==
- Kim Chong-t'ae Electric Locomotive Works
