= Panmun station =

Railway station in Kaesong, North Korea

Coordinates: 37°55′41″N 126°38′36″E

P'anmun 판문
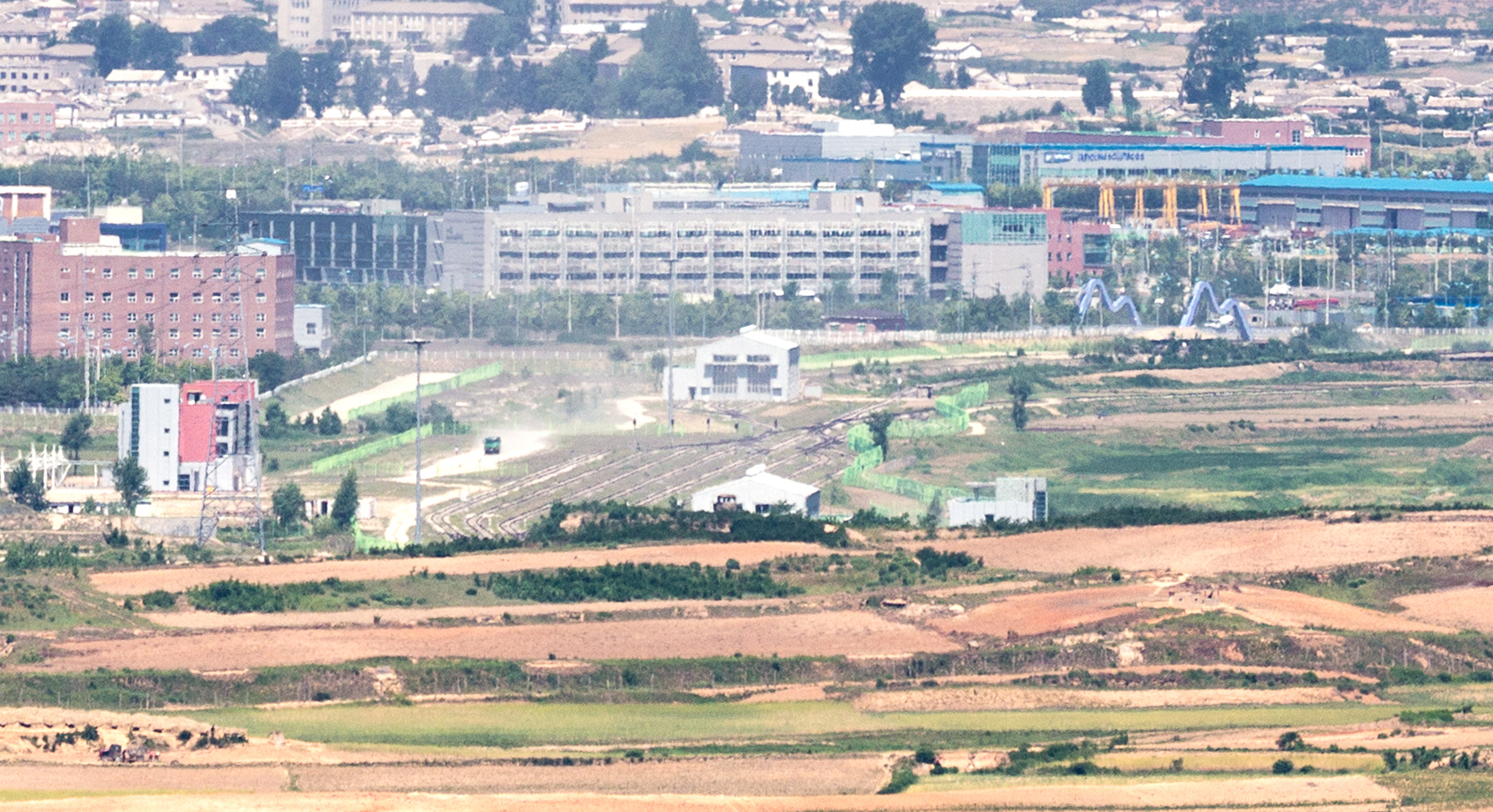
- View of the station yard

Korean name
- Hangul: 판문역
- Hanja: 板門驛
- Revised Romanization: Panmun-yeok
- McCune–Reischauer: P'anmun-yŏk

General information
- Location: Kaesŏng Industrial Region, North Hwanghae Province; North Korea
- Owner: Korean State Railway
- Operator: Korean State Railway
- Platforms: 1 (1 side platform)
- Tracks: 1

History
- Opened: 1 April 1908
- Closed: 1950-1953
- Rebuilt: 2003

Services
Preceding station	Korean State Railway	Following station
Pongdong towards P'yŏngyang	P'yŏngbu Line Not in regular service	Dorasan (ROK) via Military Demarcation Line Terminus
Location

P'anmun station is a railway station located in the Kaesŏng Industrial Region, North Hwanghae province, North Korea. It is located on the P'yŏngbu Line, which was formed from part of the Kyŏngŭi Line to accommodate the shift of the capital from Seoul to P'yŏngyang.

== History ==
Although the Kyŏngŭi Line was originally opened on 3 April 1906, the station itself was opened for passenger and freight service on 1 April 1908; the station was closed after the Korean War. The station, as well as the disused section from Kaesŏng across the DMZ to Dorasan, was rebuilt in 2003, and a special train inaugurating the reopened line ran on 17 May 2007. Regular freight service began between Dorasan and the Kaesŏng Industrial Region, and although passenger service for South Korean workers exists between Dorasan and the Kaesŏng Industrial Area, apart from the inaugural special train, there has been no passenger service to P'anmun station. The freight and passenger services have been interrupted several times as a result of political events between North and South that have caused the closure of the industrial district; it was reopened on 16 September 2013 after a five-month shutdown. After a 10-year shutdown, on 30 November 2018 the first South Korean train arrived towards Panmun station and crossed the DMZ.
