= Kaepung station =

Railway station in North Korea

Kaep'ung 개풍

Korean name
- Hangul: 개풍역
- Hanja: 開豐驛
- Revised Romanization: Gaepung-yeok
- McCune–Reischauer: Kaep'ung-yŏk

General information
- Location: Kaep'ung-ŭp, Kaepung-guyok, Kaesong; North Korea
- Coordinates: 37.9525°N 126.4575°E
- Owner: Korean State Railway

History
- Opened: 1906
- Former names: T'osŏng
- Original company: Chosen Government Railway

Services
Preceding station	Korean State Railway	Following station
Ryŏhyŏn towards P'yŏngyang	P'yŏngbu Line	Kaesŏng Terminus
Location

Kaep'ung station is a railway station located in Kaep'ung-ŭp, Kaepung-guyok, Kaesong city, North Korea. It is on located on the P'yŏngbu Line, which was formed from part of the Kyŏngŭi Line to accommodate the shift of the capital from Seoul to P'yŏngyang; though this line physically connects P'yŏngyang to Pusan via Dorasan, in operational reality it ends at Kaesŏng due to the Korean Demilitarized Zone.

== History ==
The station, originally called T'osŏng station, was opened by the Chosen Government Railway in 1906.

In September 1932, the Hwanghae Line was extended from Yŏn'an to T'osŏng, and in 1944 that line was nationalised and was renamed T'ŏhae Line. As a result of the division of Korea after the Second World War, part of the T'ŏhae Line ended up in South Korea, and passenger trains operated between Tosŏng and Ch'ŏngdan. During the Korean War, the bridge spanning the Ryesŏng River was destroyed, severing the connection between T'osŏng and Paech'ŏn, disconnecting the T'ŏhae and P'yŏngbu lines; the bridge was never rebuilt.

After the end of the Korean War, T'osŏng ended up in North Korea. In December 1952, T'osŏng and four other localities were incorporated into Kaep'ung-ŭp, and the station was renamed to its current name.
