= Pyongbu Line =

Railway line in North Korea

P'yŏngbu Line
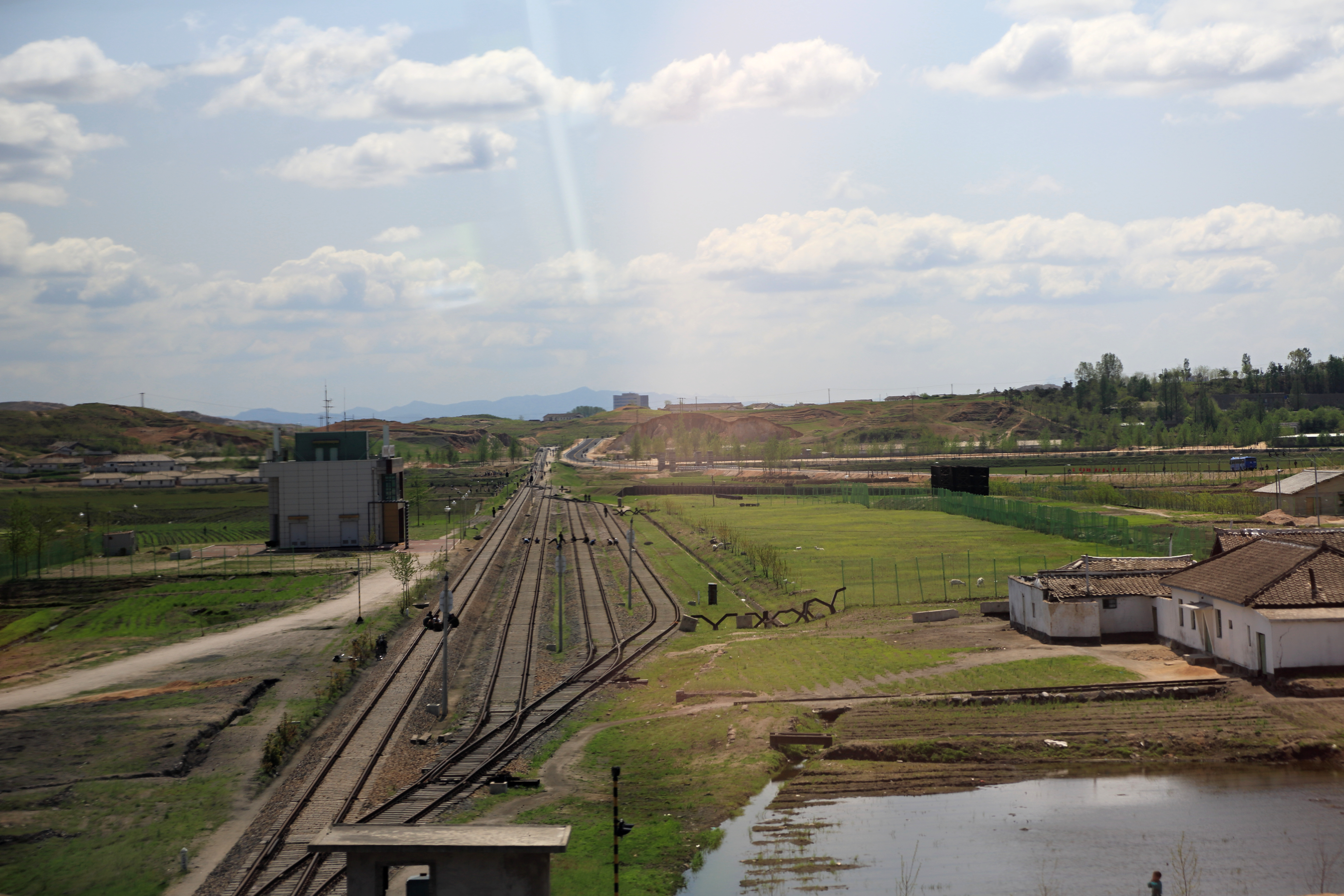
- View of Sonha Station near the inter-Korean border

Overview
- Native name: 평부선; 平釜線
- Status: Operational
- Owner: Korean State Railway
- Locale: P'yŏngyang, North Hwanghae Province, South Hwanghae Province
- Termini: P'yŏngyang; P'anmun (in North Korea) Busan (in South Korea)
- Stations: 26

Service
- Type: Heavy rail, Regional rail passenger/freight
- Operator: Korean State Railway
- Depot(s): Sariwŏn, Sŏhŭng, P'anmun

History
- Opened: 5 November 1905 (freight); 3 April 1906 (passenger)

Technical
- Line length: 187.3 km (116.4 mi)
- Number of tracks: single track
- Track gauge: 1,435 mm (4 ft 8 1/2 in)
- Minimum radius: 300 m (980 ft)
- Electrification: 3000 V DC Overhead line
- Operating speed: 100 km/h (62 mph)
- Maximum incline: 11‰
Route map
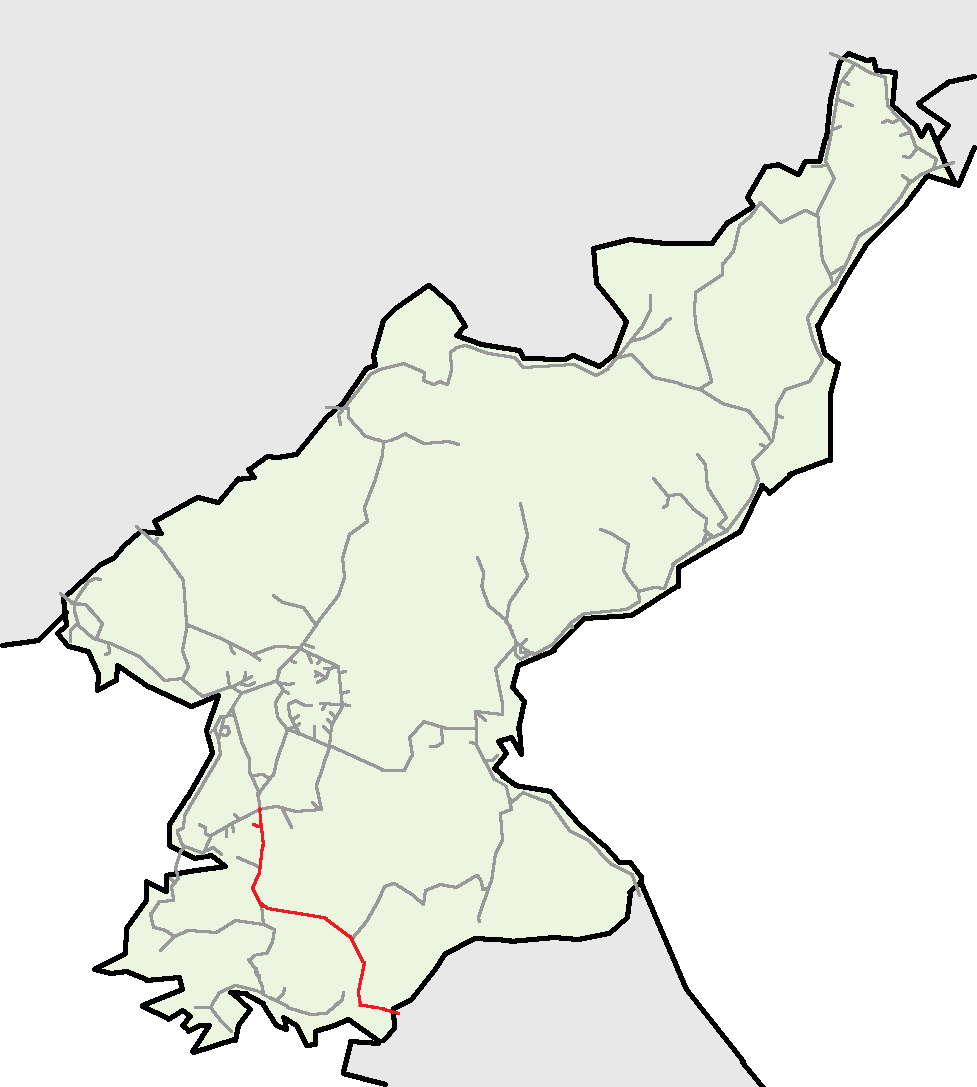

- Pyongbu Line
- Hangul: 평부선
- Hanja: 平釜線
- RR: Pyeongbuseon
- MR: P'yŏngbusŏn

The P'yŏngbu Line is an electrified standard-gauge trunk line of the Korean State Railway running from P'yŏngyang to Kaesŏng in North Korea and further south across the DMZ to Seoul in South Korea; the name comes from the two (theoretical) termini of the line: P'yŏngyang and Busan.

The total length of the line from P'yŏngyang to Busan is 719.8 km (447.3 mi); however, due to the Korean Demilitarized Zone, regular operation is restricted to the 187.3 km (116.4 mi) section between P'yŏngyang and Kaesŏng. 22% of the line is laid with concrete sleepers, and it is the only railway line in North Korea capable of speeds of 100 km/h (62 mph). The ruling grade is 11‰, the minimum curve radius is 300 m (980 ft), and there are 99 bridges [total length 4,310 m (14,140 ft)] and 13 tunnels [total length 3,244 m (10,643 ft)].

The P'yŏngyang–Hwangju section is under the jurisdiction of the P'yŏngyang Railway Bureau, whilst the rest of the line from Hwangju south is under the Sariwŏn Railway Bureau. There are 28 stations on the line, and the average distance between stations is 6.7 km (4.2 mi). Along with locomotive depots at Sariwŏn, Sŏhŭng, and P'anmun, there are large freight-handling facilities at Hwangju, Chunghwa, East Sariwŏn, Sŏhŭng, P'yŏngsan and Kaesŏng.

The P'yŏngbu Line connects to the P'yŏngui, P'yŏngnam, and P'yŏngra lines at P'yŏngyang, to the P'yŏngdŏk Line at Taedonggang, to the Songrim Line at Hwangju, to the Hwanghae Ch'ŏngnyŏn Line at Sariwŏn, and the Ch'ŏngnyŏn Ich'ŏn Line at P'yŏngsan.

== History ==
For the original line's history and other information before 1945, see Gyeongui Line (1904–1945).

Construction of the Seoul–Kaesŏng railway line began in 1902. After the outbreak of the Russo-Japanese War it became imperative to transport freight north from Seoul to Sinŭiju. Thus the Kyŏngŭi Line was rapidly built, being opened by the Temporary Military Railway for freight traffic on 5 November 1905 and to passengers on 3 April 1906. It was subsequently taken over by the Chosen Government Railway (Sentetsu) on 1 September 1906. By 1 April 1908, when the "Ryuki" express train from Busan to Sinŭiju entered service, every station on the line was operational.

The railway bridge across the Yalu River between Sinŭiju and Andong (now Dandong) was opened in November 1911, connecting the line to the South Manchuria Railway. Starting in 1913, tickets from Seoul to London were sold, traveling via the Kyongŭi Line, the South Manchuria Railway, and the Trans-Siberian Railway. By the 1930s Sentetsu had put international trains between Korea and Manchuria, such as the Hikari, Nozomi, and Koa express trains, into service on this line.

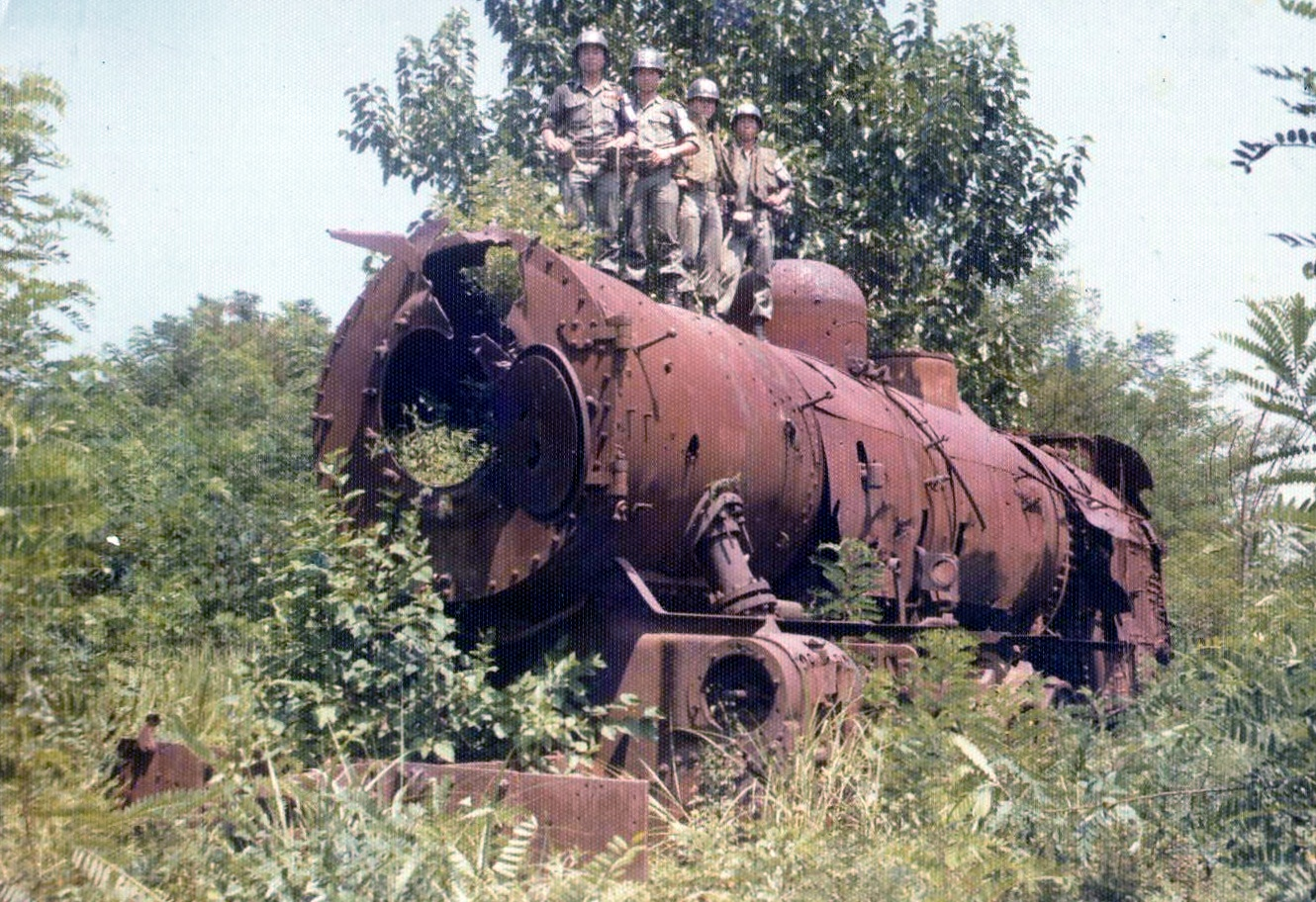
The ruins of Mate 10 at Changdan in 1976.

After the Pacific War and the end of Japanese rule in 1945, Korea was partitioned along the 38th parallel, with the northern half under Soviet control. This cut the line in half between Sariwŏn and Kaep'ung, with the Korean State Railway of the DPRK—initially the Soviet Army—operating trains between P'yŏngyang and Sariwŏn, and the Korean National Railroad of South Korea operating passenger trains between Seoul and T'osŏng (now Kaep'ung). On 31 December 1950 a train consisting of the locomotive "Mate 10" and 25 cars, going from Hanp'o to Munsan, was ordered to stop at Changdan by the US Army and was destroyed. The locomotive is now on display at Imjingak. The end of the Korean War established the current inner-Korean border, after which the North Korean section of the former Kyongŭi Line was split into two separate lines—the P'yŏngŭi Line from P'yŏngyang north to Sinŭiju, and the P'yŏngbu line from P'yŏngyang south to Kaesŏng, P'anmun and the DMZ.

After having been closed since 1948, on 15 June 2000 an inter-Korean Joint Declaration was made, announcing the intention to reconnect the railways between North and South. On 31 July at the ministerial talks it was agreed to reopen the connection between the P'yŏngbu Line and the Gyeongui Line from Kaesŏng to Dorasan through the DMZ. Celebrations marking the reconnection were held on 14 June 2003 in North and South Korea. On 17 May 2007 the first train between North and South crossed the DMZ, carrying invited dignitaries from both sides of the inner-Korean border. The new stations at Sonha and P'anmun were opened at this time. The first scheduled freight train ran on 11 December 2007, carrying construction materials from Munsan in the South to Kaesong, and footwear and clothing on the return trip to the South.

The rebuilt station at Pongdong between Sonha and P'anmun was also opened on this date. From then on, freight trains from the south to the Kaesŏng Industrial District were operated until 28 November 2008, when the North temporarily closed the line due to changes in the political situation. On 25 August 2009 it was closed once again, subsequently reopening on 1 December of that year. Tensions between North and South escalated again in 2013, leading to the closure of the border again on 4 May of that year, remaining closed until 16 September when it was reopened. As of 10 February 2016 the border crossing is once again closed.

== Services ==
=== Freight ===
Freight forwarded on the line is greatly dependent on the direction of movement. Between Taedonggang and Hwangju, southbound freight traffic is 1.8 to 2 times greater than northbound, between Sariwŏn and P'yŏngsan, 56% of freight traffic is northbound, slightly higher than southbound.

Sariwŏn Ch'ŏngnyŏn station is the most important in freight traffic, having a large, automated freight sorting yard. Important freight yards are also in Chunghwa, Hwangju, P'yŏngsan, Sŏhŭng and Kaesŏng. Major commodities arriving at Sariwŏn include anthracite, fertilizer, steel, logs, stone, sand, and gravel. Freight arriving to Kaesŏng includes anthracite, wood, fertilizer, salt, steel, and cement, while outbound shipments from Kaesŏng are made up of granite and iron ore towards the north, and (when the border crossing is open) clothing, footwear and other products from the Kaesong Industrial Complex.

The P'yŏngbu Line serves important industries such as the Hwanghae Iron & Steel Complex, the February 8 Cement Complex, the Sariwŏn Textile Factory, the Haeju Industrial Zone via the Hwanghae Ch'ŏngnyŏn Line, as well as several mines, quarries, and other small- and medium-sized industries in South Hwanghae province. Further, as it runs through one of North Korea's most important agricultural areas, grain, fertiliser, pesticides and agricultural machinery make up a large part of freight moved on the line.

Cement makes up a very significant portion of freight forwarded from points on the P'yŏngbu Line. Cement from the February 8 Cement Complex at West Pongsan on the Pongsan Branch accounts for up to 39% of northbound freight traffic on the Pongsan–Sariwŏn section, a portion of this being destined for the port at Haeju for export, via the Hwanghae Ch'ŏngnyŏn Line. Ore and minerals also make up a notable portion of freight moved on the line, destined for the Hwanghae Iron & Steel Complex at Changch'ŏlli on the Songrim Line, and for the Ch'ŏllima Steel Complex and the Namp'o Smelting Complex on the P'yŏngnam Line. This includes minerals from sources on the P'yŏngbu Line, such as limestone from Munmu, silica from Kaep'ung, and fluorspar from P'yŏngsan, as well as iron ore from Ch'ŏlgwang on the Ŭllyul Line, which is brought onto the P'yŏngbu Line via the Hwanghae Ch'ŏngnyŏn Line via Sariwŏn. Pig iron, steel and other ferrous metals from the Hwanghae Iron & Steel Complex make up up to 22% of northbound freight traffic from Hwangju towards P'yŏngyang. There is no northbound coal traffic, yet coal accounts for the majority of southbound freight, due to the lack of coal deposits in South and North Hwanghae provinces. Coal forwarded from the P'yŏngdŏk Line is brought onto the P'yŏngbu Line at Taedonggang, from where some goes to P'yŏngyang, but the bulk moves south; in particular, up to 76% of southbound freight between Taedonggang and Hwangju is coal, most of it destined for the Hwanghae Iron & Steel Complex.

=== Passenger ===
The P'yŏngbu Line is connected to several other lines in P'yŏngyang, and, as such, is responsible for a portion of passenger traffic from Kaesŏng and South Hwanghae province. However, passenger traffic on the P'yŏngbu Line is relatively light in comparison to the high volumes of passenger movements on the P'yŏngŭi and P'yŏngra Lines. Hwangju, Sŏhŭng, Kŭmch'ŏn, and P'yŏngsan stations are transfer points for passengers from Yŏnt'an, Rinsan and T'osan counties, which have no railways.

The following passenger trains are known to operate on the North Korean section of the line:

- Express trains 15-16/17-18, operating between Haeju Ch'ŏngnyŏn and Manp'o Ch'ŏngnyŏn, run on this line between Sariwŏn and P'yŏngyang.
- Semi-express trains 104-107/108-111, operating between Haeju Ch'ŏngnyŏn and Hyesan Ch'ŏngnyŏn, run on this line between Sariwŏn and P'yŏngyang.
- Semi-express trains 119-122/120-121, operating between Sinch'ŏn and Ch'ŏngjin Ch'ŏngnyŏn, run on this line between Sariwŏn and P'yŏngyang.
- Semi-express trains 138-139/140-141, operating between Manp'o Ch'ŏngnyŏn and Changyŏn, run on this line between Taedonggang and Sariwŏn;.
- Semi-express trains 142-143/144-145, operating between Sinŭiju Ch'ŏngnyŏn and Kaesŏng, run on this line between P'yŏngyang and Kaesŏng;
- Local trains 202-203-204/205-206-207, operating between Hamhŭng and Sariwŏn Ch'ŏngnyŏn, run on this line between P'yŏngyang and Sariwŏn.
- Local trains 219/220, operating between Taedonggang and Ch'ŏlgwang, run on this line between Taedonggang and Sariwŏn.
- Local trains 222-223/224, operating between Kalli and Kaesŏng, run on this line between P'yŏngyang and Kaesŏng.
- Local trains 236-237/238-239, operating between Sariwŏn Ch'ŏngnyŏn and Tŏkch'ŏn, run on this line between Sariwŏn and Taedonggang.
- Local trains 240-241/242-243, operating between Haeju Ch'ŏngnyŏn and Namp'o, run on this line between Sariwŏn and P'yŏngyang.

In the 1980s there was a long-distance local train running between Sariwŏn Ch'ŏngnyŏn and Hamhŭng, which ran from Sariwŏn to P'yŏngsan via the P'yŏngbu Line, from P'yŏngsan to Sep'o Ch'ŏngnyŏn via the Ch'ŏngnyŏn Ichŏn Line, from Sep'o to Kowŏn via the Kangwŏn Line, and from Kowŏn to Hamhng via the P'yŏngra Line—a distance of 398.1 km (247.4 mi). The current status of this service is not known.

There is only one express train operating on this line, due to a far greater demand for short-distance commuter service than long-distance travel.

== Route ==
A yellow background in the "Distance" box indicates that section of the line is not electrified.

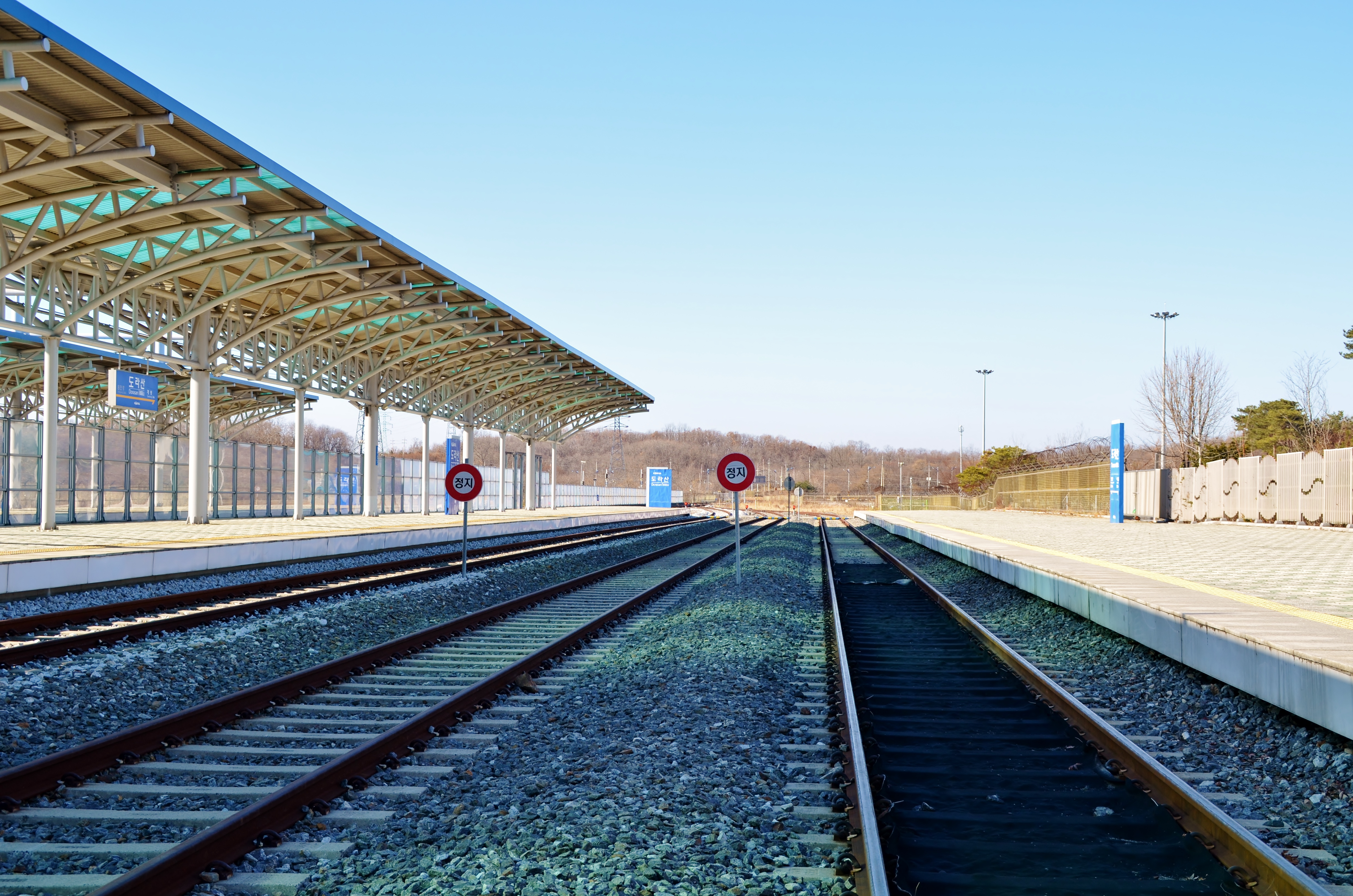
P'yŏngbu Line tracks at Dorasan station in the DMZ

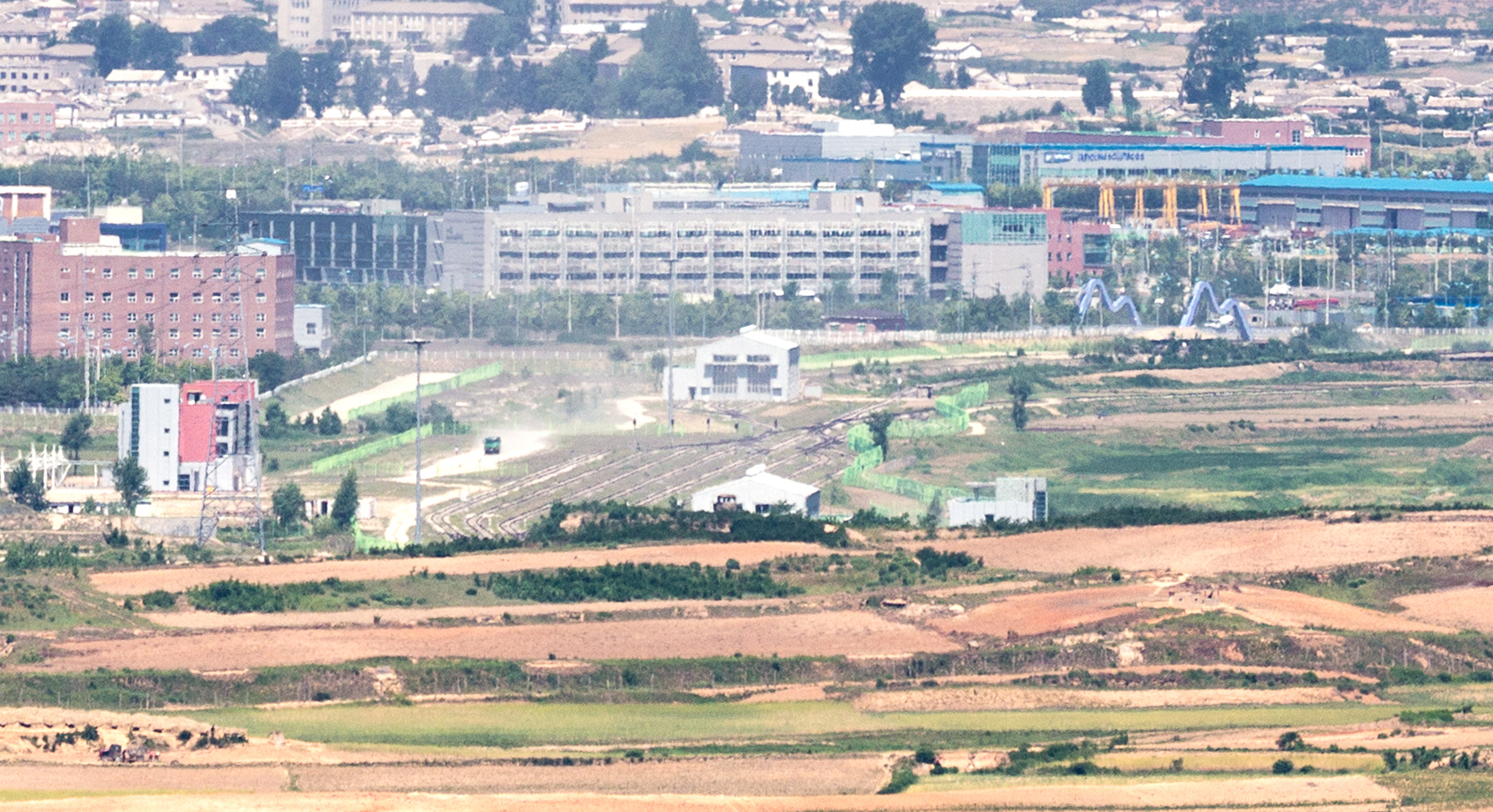
View of the railway yard of P'anmun station at the Kaesŏng industrial complex

Distance (km)			Station name		Former name		
Total	S2S	from Seoul	Transcribed	Chosŏn'gŭl (Hanja)	Transcribed	Chosŏn'gŭl (Hanja)	Connections
0.0	0.0	261.0	P'yŏngyang	평양; 平壤			P'yŏngnam Line; P'yŏngra Line, P'yŏngŭi Line ● Ch'ŏllima Line Yŏnggwang Station ● Tram Line 1
2.6	2.6	258.4	Taedonggang	대동강; 大同江			P'yŏngdŏk Line ● Tram Line 2
10.8	8.0	250.4	Ryŏkp'o	력포; 力浦			Rangrang Line
17.8	7.2	243.2	Chunghwa	중화; 中和			
24.4	6.6	236.6	Hŭkkyo	흑교; 黑橋			
31.1	6.7	229.9	Kindŭng	긴등 (긴登)			
36.5	5.4	224.5	Hwangju	황주; 黃州	Hwanghae Hwangju	황해황주; 黃海黃州	Songrim Line
46.7	10.2	214.3	Ch'imch'on	침촌; 沈村			
53.8	7.1	207.2	Chŏngbang	정방; 正方	Kyedong	계동; 桂東	
60.5	6.7	200.5	Sariwŏn Ch'ŏngnyŏn	사리원청년; 沙里院靑年	Sariwŏn	사리원; 沙里院	Hwanghae Ch. Line
65.1	4.6	195.9	East Sariwŏn	동사리원; 東沙里院			
70.5	5.4	190.5	Pongsan	봉산; 鳳山	Madong	마동; 馬洞	Pongsan Line
77.5	7.0	183.5	Ch'ŏnggye	청계; 淸溪			
85.4	7.9	175.6	Hŭngsu	흥수; 興水			
90.2	4.8	170.8	Munmu	문무; 文武	Munmuri	문무리; 文武里	
100.6	10.4	160.4	Sŏkhyŏn	석현; 石峴	Sŏhŭng	서흥; 瑞興	
107.4	6.8	153.6	Sŏhŭng	서흥; 瑞興	Sinmak	신막; 新幕	
117.9	10.5	143.1	Mulgae	물개; 物開			
126.7	8.8	134.3	P'yŏngsan	평산; 平山	Namch'ŏn	남천; 南川	Ch. Ich'ŏn Line
135.3	8.6	125.7	T'aebaeksansŏng	태백산성; 太白山城	P'yŏngsan	평산; 平山	
141.0	5.7	120.0	Hanp'o	한포; 汗浦			
151.3	10.3	109.7	Kŭmch'ŏn	금천; 金川	Kŭmgyo	금교; 金郊	
163.2	11.9	97.8	Kyejŏng	계정; 鷄井			
170.4	7.2	90.6	Ryŏhyŏn	려현; 礪峴	Yŏhyŏn	여현; 礪峴	
178.2	7.8	82.8	Kaep'ung	개풍; 開豊	T'osŏng	토성; 土城	former T'ohae Line
187.3	9.1	73.7	Kaesŏng	개성; 開城			
Tracks past Kaesŏng not in regular use
191.2	3.9	69.8	Sonha	손하; 孫河			
195.1	3.9	65.9	Pongdong	봉동; 鳳東			
197.6	2.5	63.4	P'anmun	판문; 板門			
↑↑ Kukch'ŏl P'yŏngbu Line ↑↑
Demilitarized Zone
↓↓ Korail Gyeongui Line ↓↓
204.9	7.3	56.1	Dorasan	도라산; 都羅山			
208.7	3.8	52.3	Imjingang	임진강; 臨津江			
211.0	2.3	50.0	Uncheon	운천; 雲泉			
214.7	3.7	46.3	Munsan	문산; 文山			
↓	↓	↓	↓	↓			
261.0	-	0.0	Seoul	서울 (-)	Gyeongseong	경성; 京城	Gyeongbu Line, Gyeongbu KTX,,,
↓↓ Korail Gyeongbu Line ↓↓
↓	↓	↓	↓	↓			
702.7	-	441.7	Busan	부산; 釜山			Gyeongbu KTX, Super Rapid Train,
