= Sohung South Airport =

- IATA: none; ICAO: KP-0052

Summary
- Airport type: Military
- Serves: Sohung, North Korea
- Elevation AMSL: 522 ft / 159 m
- Coordinates: 38°21′23.30″N 126°13′09.70″E

Map
- Location of airport in North Korea

Runways
Direction	Length		Surface
Direction	ft	m	Surface
18/36	2,800	853	Grass

Sohung South Airport(서흥비행장) is an airport in Hwanghae-bukto, North Korea.

== Facilities ==
The airfield has a single grass runway 18/36 measuring 2800 x 154 feet (853 x 47 m).
