= Kaesong Industrial Region =

Special administrative industrial region of North Korea

Coordinates: 37°56′N 126°38′E

- Special administrative industrial region

Korean transcription(s)
  - Hangul: 개성공업지구
  - Hanja: 開城工業地區
  - Revised Romanization: Gaeseong Gongeop Jigu
  - McCune–Reischauer: Kaesŏng Kongŏp Chigu

Short name transcription(s)
  - Hangul: 개성공단
  - Hanja: 開城工團
  - Revised Romanization: Gaeseonggongdan
  - McCune–Reischauer: Kaesŏnggongdan
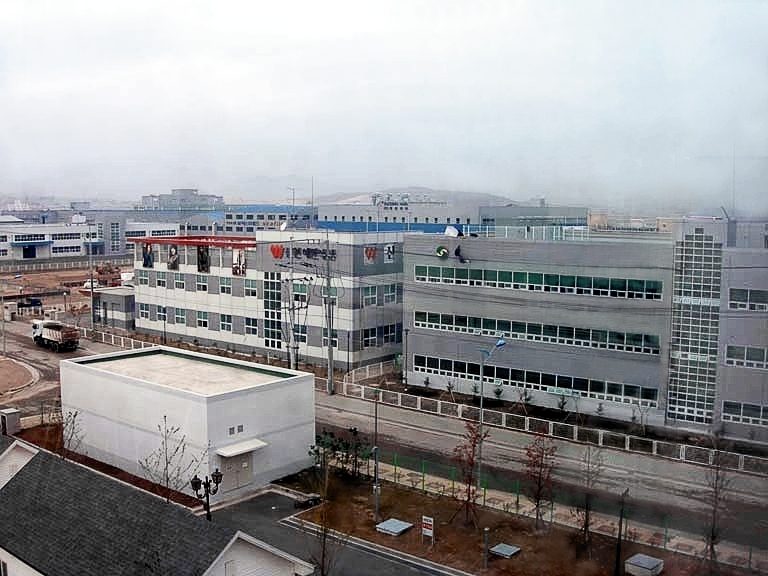
- Factories in Kaesong

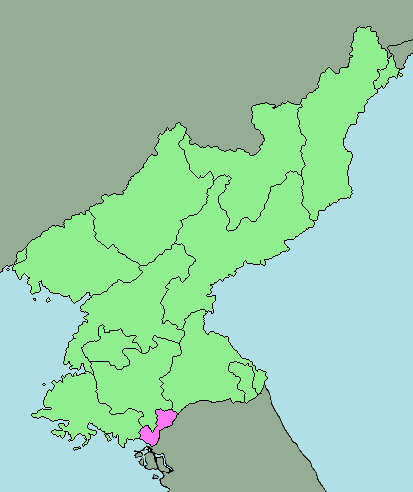
- Map of North Korea highlighting the region
- Country: North Korea

Government
  - Type: Industrial Region

Area
  - Total: 66 km^{2} (25 sq mi)
- Dialect: Seoul
- Split from Kaesŏng Directly Governed City in 2002.

The Kaesŏng Industrial Region (KIR) or Kaesŏng Industrial Zone (KIZ) is a special administrative industrial region of North Korea (DPRK). It was formed in 2002 from part of the Kaesŏng Directly-Governed City. On 10 February 2016, it was temporarily closed by the South Korean government and all staff recalled by the Park Geun-hye administration, although the former President of South Korea, Moon Jae-in, signalled his desire to "reopen and expand" the region in 2017.

Its most notable feature is the Kaesŏng industrial park, which operated from 2004 to 2016 as a collaborative economic development with South Korea (ROK). The park is located ten kilometres (six miles) north of the Korean Demilitarized Zone, an hour's drive from Seoul, and was with direct road and rail access to South Korea. The park allows South Korean companies to employ cheap labour that is educated, skilled, and fluent in Korean, whilst providing North Korea with an important source of foreign currency.

As of April 2013, 123 South Korean companies were employing approximately 53,000 DPRK workers and 800 ROK staff.

At times of tension between North and South Korea, southern access to the Industrial Park has been restricted. On 3 April 2013, during the 2013 Korean crisis, North Korea blocked access to the region to all South Korean citizens. On 8 April 2013, the North Korean government removed all 53,000 North Korean workers from the Kaesŏng industrial park, which effectively shut down all activities. On 15 August 2013, both countries agreed that the industrial park should be reopened.

On 10 February 2016, the South Korean Ministry of Unification announced that the industrial park would be "temporarily" closed down and all staff recalled, partly in protest over continued North Korean provocations, including a satellite launch and a claimed hydrogen bomb test in January 2016. The next day, the North announced it was expelling all South Korean workers and said it will freeze all South Korean assets and equipment at the jointly run factory park. All 280 South Korean workers present at Kaesŏng left hours after the announcement by the North.

== Kaesong Industrial Park ==
Construction started in June 2003, and in August 2003 North and South Korea ratified four tax and accountancy agreements to support investment. Pilot construction was completed in June 2004, and the industrial park opened in December 2004.

=== Initial phase ===
In the park's initial phase, 15 South Korean companies constructed manufacturing facilities. Three of the companies started operations by March 2005. First phase plans envisaged participation by 250 South Korean companies from 2006, employing 100,000 people by 2007.

=== Planned final phase ===
The park was expected to be complete in 2012, covering 65 km^{2} and employing 700,000 people. The plan also called for a supporting zone, roughly a third the size of the industrial zone, that was meant for life-quality operations. Specifically, this meant the creation of residential areas, hospitals, shopping centers, and even a proposed theme park to attract tourists.

=== Organization ===
The Kaesong Industrial Park used to be run by a South Korean committee that has a 50-year lease that began in 2004. Hyundai Asan, a division of South Korean conglomerate Hyundai, was hired by Pyongyang to develop the land. The firms took advantage of low-cost labor available in the North to compete with China to create low-end goods such as shoes, clothes, and watches.

In 2006, Park Suhk-sam, senior economist at the Bank of Korea, predicted the industrial zone could create 725,000 jobs and generate $500 million in annual wage income for the North Korean economy by 2012. Five years later, another $1.78 billion would be earned from annual corporate taxes levied on South Korean companies participating in the industrial project.

=== Firms operating within the park ===
By the end of the first full year of operation, 11 South Korean firms were operating in the KIR. By 2006, the 15 initial firms had all begun production including JCCOM, Yongin Electronics, TS Precision Machinery, JY Solutec, Magic Micro, Hosan Ace, Romanson, Munchang Co., Daewha Fuel Pump, Taesong Industrial, Bucheon Industrial, Samduk Trading, Shinwon, SJ Tech, and Sonoko Cuisine Ware. In February 2016, shortly before the park was closed for the last time, the number of South Korean firms operating in the park had increased to 124. The different types of manufacturing performed in the park broke down to 71 textile and clothing firms, nine chemical product firms, 23 that dealt in metals and machinery, 13 that produced electronics, and eight firms of other kinds of production.

=== Obstacles ===
The zone faces a number of obstacles. Among the most pressing are U.S. economic sanctions against the North, prohibiting imports of key technologies and goods, such as computers.

=== Wage and rent agreements ===
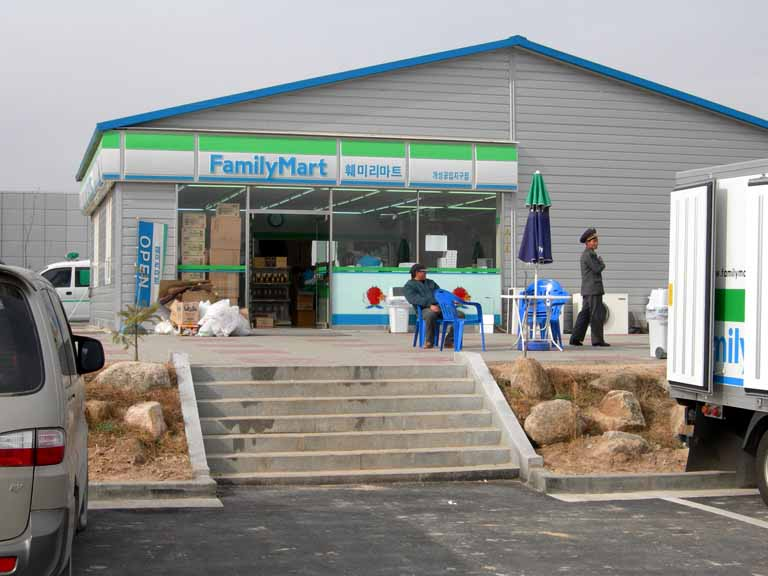
FamilyMart in the industrial zone. North Koreans were prohibited from using the convenience store, which was set up for the use of South Korean workers. North Korean currency was not accepted.

In May 2009, Pyongyang announced it unilaterally scrapped wage and rent agreements at the industrial park. In June 2009, they also demanded new salaries of $300 a month for its 40,000 workers, compared with the $75 they had been receiving prior.

In September 2009, a visit to North Korea by the Hyundai Group chairwoman led to a resolution to the North's demands, with mild wage increases and no change in land rents.

In 2012, wages were estimated at $160 per month, about one-fifth of the South Korean minimum wage, and about a quarter of typical Chinese wages.

=== Taxes and revenue ===
In 2012, the Ministry of Unification was informed that eight of the current 123 companies had received a tax collection notice. The notices were made by a unilateral decision by North Korea. The eight companies were informed of a notice to pay ₩170,208,077 ($160,000 US) in taxes; two of the companies had already paid $20,000 in taxes to North Korea.

Unilateral decisions by the Central Special Direct General Bureau (CSDGB) to amend bylaws is a violation of Kaesŏng Industrial District Law, which requires that any revision of the laws be negotiated between the North and the South.

For the first time, in 2011, the companies in the KIR recorded an average operating profit of ₩56 million ($56,241 US), finally operating in the black after years in deficit.

==== Green Doctors ====
Green Doctors, an NGO founded in Busan in January 2004, received official government permission to open a hospital in the region in 2005. Since then, it provided medical treatment to the workers at Kaesŏng until the closure of the complex. The doctors who worked there received no salary.

=== Cheonan incident ===
In May 2010, following the sinking of the ROKS Cheonan and South Korea's response, North Korea severed ties with South Korea and shut its Consultative Office; however, existing activities in the zone maintained production activities, and transport and telephones to South Korea were operating normally.

=== 2013 closure and reopening ===
On 3 April 2013, North Korea began to deny South Korean employees access to the Kaesong Industrial region. This came as tensions began escalating rapidly between Seoul and Pyongyang. On 8 April, North Korea recalled all 53,000 North Korean workers from the Kaesong Industrial complex, fully suspending its operations. However, 406 South Koreans remained at the complex after its effective closure.

On 17 April, North Korea barred a delegation of 10 South Korean businessmen from delivering food and supplies to the 200 South Korean staff who remained in the industrial zone. On 26 April 2013, South Korea decided to withdraw all remaining staff, and on 4 May, the last seven South Koreans left the Kaesong Industrial Region, which thus was completely shut down.

On 4 July, both countries agreed in principle that the Kaesong Industrial Park should be reopened, as tensions between the two began to cool. Six rounds of talks were held without reaching a concrete agreement, with South Korea's insistence on a provision to prevent North Korea from closing the complex again in the future. During the first week of August, North Korea reiterated that reopening the complex was in both nations' interest. On 13 August South Korea said it would start distributing insurance payments to businesses in the complex, but also said it was open to new wording on the issue of joint control of Kaesŏng. The move, seen as precursor to formally closing the region, sparked a seventh round of talks which South Korea label as "final". An official agreement to reopen the complex was reached and signed on 15 August. The agreement included provisions designed to ensure against a similar shutdown in the future. A joint committee was formed to determine if compensation will be provided for economic losses caused by the shutdown.

On 13 September, before the reopening of Kaesŏng Industrial region, the two governments held a subcommittee meeting to iron out additional issues regarding entrance, legal stay, communication, customs and passing. This also discussed the resumption of tourism in the Mount Kumgang Tourist Region.

On 16 September, Kaesŏng was reopened after five months. All of the 123 companies operating in Kaesŏng experienced losses equaling a combined £575 million ($944 million).

=== 2016 closure ===
On 10 February 2016, in response to a rocket launch by the DPRK, South Korea announced that it would, for the first time, halt operations in the region, describing the launch as a disguised ballistic missile test. Seoul said all operations at the complex would halt, to stop the North using its investment "to fund its nuclear and missile development". The next day, the North announced it was expelling all South Korean workers and said it would freeze all South Korean assets and equipment at the jointly run factory park. All 280 South Korean workers present at Kaesŏng left hours after the announcement by the North.

On Thursday, 11 February, a few minutes before midnight, the South announced it had shut off the supply of electricity and water into Kaesong that supplied the factory zone.

In South Korean domestic politics, there were two opposing viewpoints toward the 2016 closure – while the Saenuri Party argued for the closure, stating that it was one and the only means to end North Korea's provocation, two other parties, The Minjoo Party and the People's Party, objecting to Saenuri, asserted that more communication is needed and that the closure would only escalate tensions in the Korean peninsula. The Saenuri Party, the ruling party at the time, said during the announcement of Kaesŏng Industrial Region's closure, "North Korea conducted the 4th nuclear test and rocket launch regardless of persistent warnings from the South Korean government and the international society. Communication and persuasion, or the 'carrots,' do not work anymore. We need more powerful sanctions on North Korea." Some people agree with the Saenuri Party, arguing that South Korea should have a more threatening and uncompromising attitudes toward North Korea so that it cannot conduct such tests again. On the other hand, The Minjoo Party and People's Party, which were the opposition parties, counter-argued that North Korea has never stopped its provocation even during its Arduous March, or the North Korean famine, emphasizing that a simple closure would never bar North Korea from testing nuclear weapons and launching missiles. They also say that the Kaesŏng Industrial Region was the last hope for peaceful resolution to everlasting tensions between the South and the North, but now that it is closed, South Korean citizens' fear over national defense will intensify.

In December 2017, an expert panel investigating the decision to close the park found that there was no evidence that North Korea had diverted wages to fund its nuclear program. The head of the panel Kim Jong-soo said, "The presidential office inserted the wage-diversion argument as major grounds, yet without concrete information, sufficient evidence and consultations with related agencies, mainly citing defector testimonies that lack objectivity and credibility. This impairs the decision's legitimacy and could constrain our ground over a future restart of the complex, while hampering the companies' rights to protect their assets due to the hasty pullout process."

A group of businesses who suffered losses of 250 billion won ($200 million) due to the closure demanded an apology and said, "Now that the wage-diversion claim has proved groundless, the government must apologize for abusing state power to suspend the complex and make utmost efforts to reopen it."

=== 2018 opening of Inter Korean Liaison Office ===
On 14 September 2018, the Inter-Korean Liaison Office located in the region officially opened. The office's purpose was to further communication between the two Koreas.

On 16 June 2020, North Korea destroyed the building via explosion, amidst heightened tensions between the countries.

North Korea blew up the Inter-Korean Liaison Office in June 2020 in response to South Korea not banning or punishing defectors from sending leaflets and flash drives into North Korea. The South Korean government did not take strict measures against North Korea, even though North Korea intentionally bombed the Inter-Korean Liaison Office―a building created to keep peaceful communication between the two countries. However, in December 2020, South Korea's National Assembly passed a law that penalizes South Korean citizens who send anti-North Korean material across the border.

=== Restoration of water supply ===
On 10 October 2018, South Korea resumed supplying water to the region. On 11 October 2018, the local water treatment plant had been restored.

== Transport ==
Two modes of travel lead to Kaesŏng, road and rail. Transportation links with South Korea were severed in October 2024, when North Korea dug trenches across roads and rail lines going to South Korea.

=== Rail ===
Kaesŏng Industrial Region is served by Korean State Railway from Panmun Station through the Pyongbu Line. Rail access to South Korea (operated by Korail) was via the Gyeongui Line. An agreement to re-establish rail freight services was made in November 2007.

The closest station in South Korea is Dorasan Station, from which road access can be taken.

=== Road ===
Limited road access was available for workers from South Korea via South Korea National Route 1 to the DMZ and then into Kaesŏng via Asian Highway 1 in the North. The route between the two highways was a paved road and part of the AH1 network. No connecting roads exist en route and a turnaround was available only in the South before entering the North.

=== Air ===
Air travel from Kaesŏng to the South is not an available option. Sohung South Airport is the closest airport to Kaesŏng in the North, but it serves no South Korea-bound flights.

The closest airports in the South are Gimpo International Airport and Incheon International Airport, from which road access can be taken to the industrial region across the inter Korean border.

== See also ==
- Rason Special Economic Zone
- Mount Kumgang Tourist Region
