= Sentetsu Mate class locomotives =

Sentetsu Mate class
Type and origin
- Power type: Steam
Specifications
- Configuration
  - Whyte: 4-8-2
- Gauge: 1,435 mm (4 ft 8 1/2 in)
Career
- Operators: Chosen Government Railway; Korean National Railway; Korean State Railway

The Mate or Mateo (Japanese マテ, Korean 마터) class locomotives were a group of steam tender locomotives of the Chosen Government Railway (Sentetsu) with 4-8-2 wheel arrangement. The "Mate" name came from the American naming system for steam locomotives, under which locomotives with 4-8-2 wheel arrangement were called "Mountain".

With the development of mining operations in the northern part of Korea, traffic volumes increased significantly. Sentetsu found a need for a locomotive with strong pulling power suitable for use on mountainous lines with sharp curves and steep slopes. The locomotive designed in response to this need was not of the Mika type, which was Sentetsu's standard freight locomotive, but of the Mate type with 4-8-2 wheel arrangement. The leading bogie was designed to reduce flange wear on the wheels. The resulting Matei class locomotives became a mainstay on long-distance freight trains on mountainous lines.

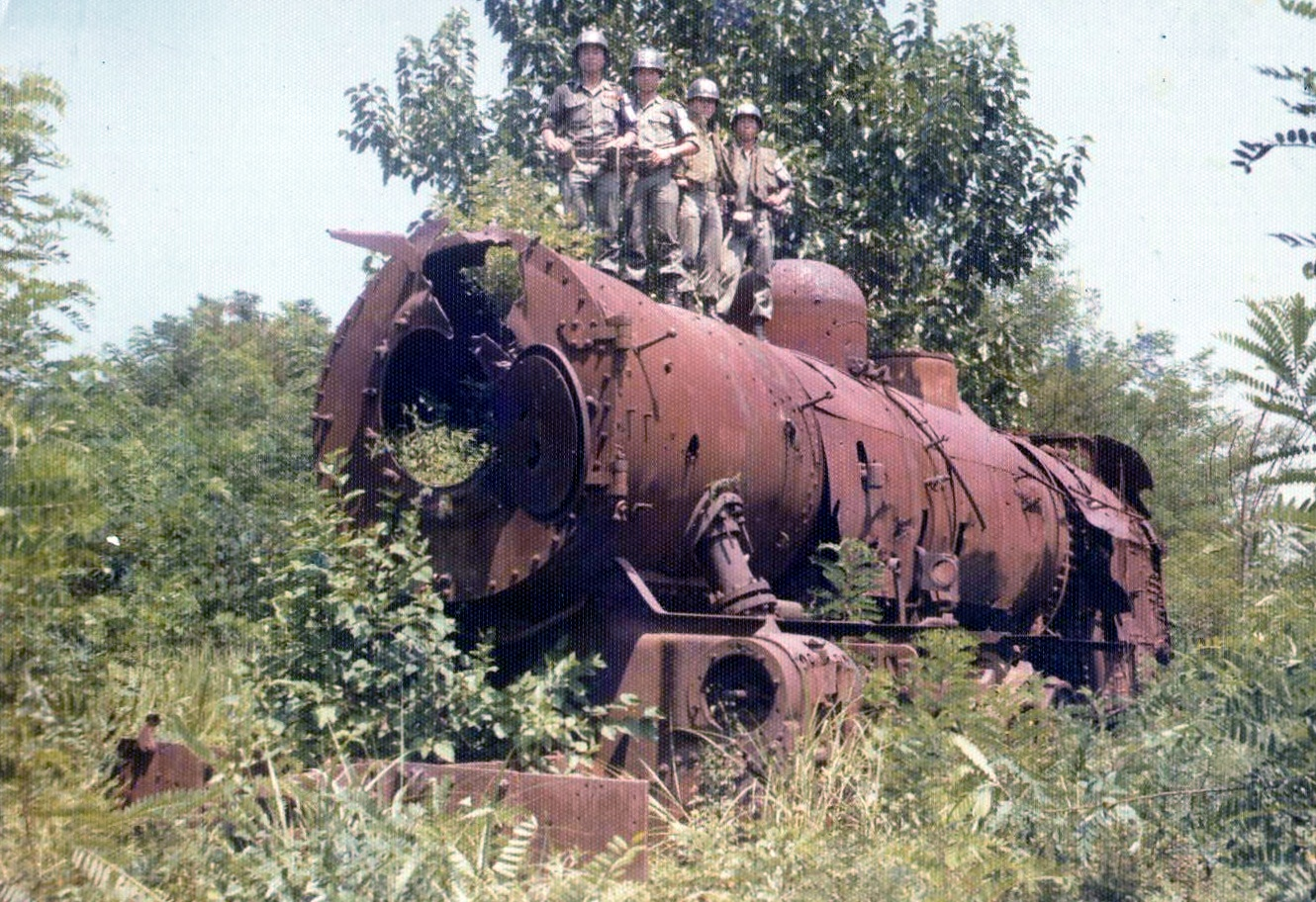
The ruins of Matei-10 at Jangdan in 1976.

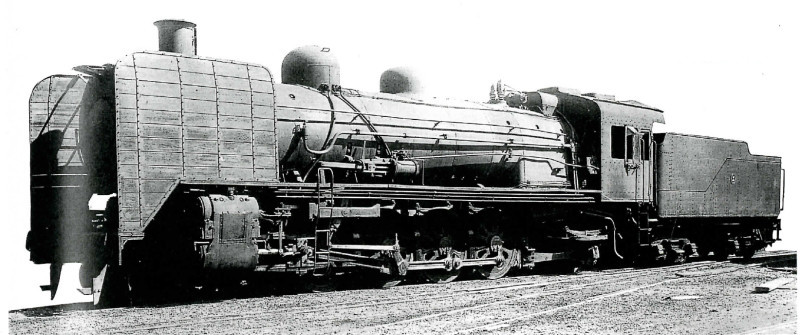
Builder's photo of a Kawasaki-built Mateni-class locomotive, taken in 1943.

There were two classes of the Mate type operated by Sentetsu, called Matei and Mateni. Fifty Matei-class and 33 Mateni-class locomotives were built by various builders in Japan, as well as by Sentetsu's Gyeongseong Works. Only 77 of the 83 built of both classes remained in 1946; of these, 33 went to the Korean National Railroad in the South and 44 to the Korean State Railway in the North. The six locomotives that remain unaccounted for were likely either destroyed during the Pacific War or were possibly taken by Soviet Army, which during its occupation of North Korea took a large number of locomotives to the USSR.
