= Korean State Railway =

National railway of North Korea

Korean State Railway 조선민주주의인민공화국 철도성

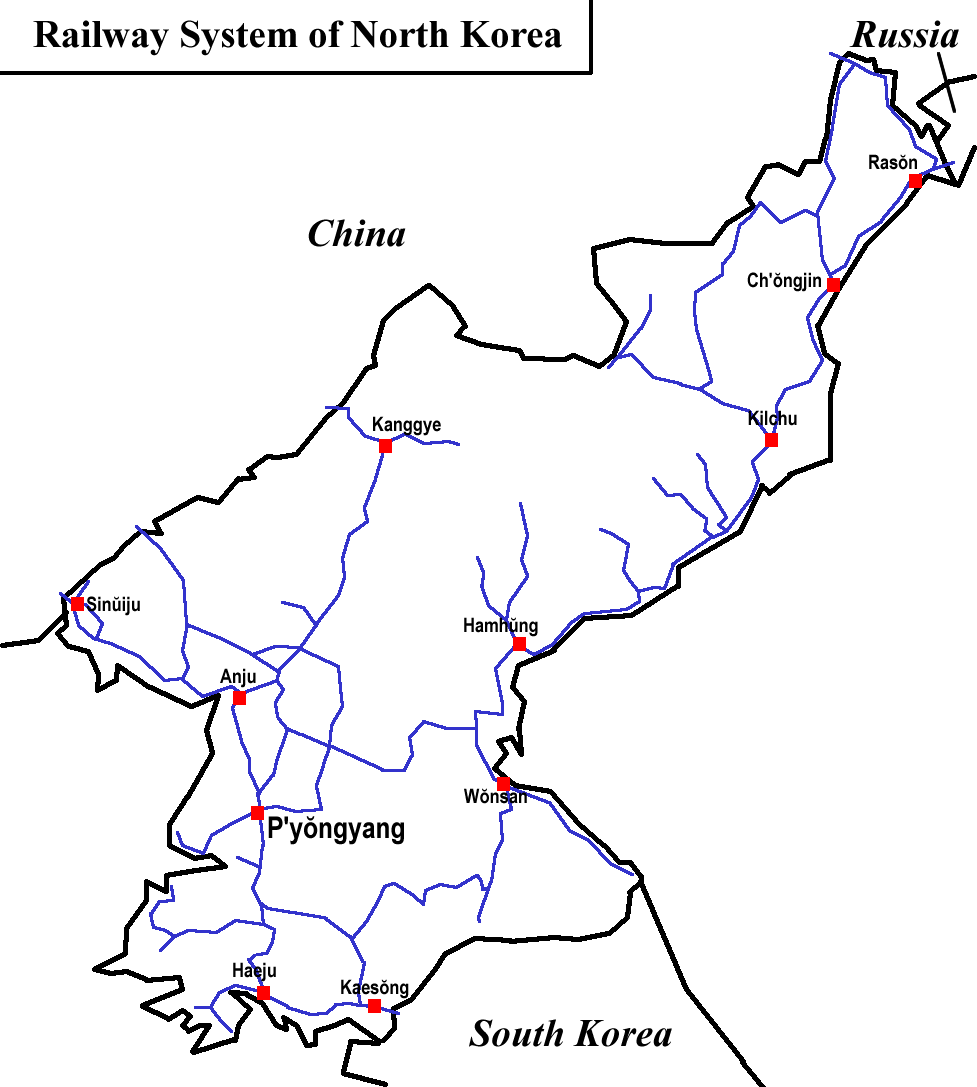
- Map of rail lines in North Korea

Overview
- Headquarters: P'yŏngyang
- Locale: North Korea
- Dates of operation: 1946; 80 years ago – present
- Predecessor: South Manchuria Railway; Chōsen Government Railway; various private railways

Technical
- Track gauge: 1,435 mm (4 ft 8 1/2 in); 762 mm (2 ft 6 in)
- Electrification: 3000 V DC (1,435 mm); 1500 V DC (762,4 mm)
- Length: 4,725 km (2,936 mi) (1,435 mm); 523 km (325 mi) (762 mm); 134 km (83 mi) (1,520 mm)

- Ministry of Railways of North Korea
- Chosŏn'gŭl: 조선민주주의인민공화국 철도성
- Hancha: 朝鮮民主主義人民共和國 鐵道省
- Revised Romanization: Joseon Minjujuui Inmin Gonghwaguk Cheoldoseong
- McCune–Reischauer: Chosŏn Minjujuŭi Inmin Konghwaguk Ch'ŏltosŏng

Korean State Railway
- Chosŏn'gŭl: 국철
- Hancha: 國鐵
- Revised Romanization: Gukcheol
- McCune–Reischauer: Kukch'ŏl

The Korean State Railway is the operating arm of the Ministry of Railways of the Democratic People's Republic of Korea (Korean: 조선민주주의인민공화국 철도성; MR: Chosŏn Minjujuŭi Inmin Konghwaguk Ch'ŏltosŏng), commonly called the State Rail (Korean: 국철; MR: Kukch'ŏl). Its headquarters are in P'yŏngyang. The current Minister of Railways is Chang Jun-song.

== History ==
=== 1945–1953: Liberation, partition, and the Korean War ===
The first railways in the future territory of North Korea were built during the period of Japanese rule by the Chosen Government Railway (Sentetsu), the South Manchuria Railway (Mantetsu) and private companies such as the Chosen Railway (Chōtetsu). At the end of the Pacific War, 2,879.3 km (1,789.1 mi) (2,466.1 km (1,532.4 mi) of standard gauge, and 413.2 km (256.8 mi) of 762 mm (30.0 in) narrow gauge) was Sentetsu owned, and 851.5 km (529.1 mi) (678.4 km (421.5 mi) of standard gauge and 173.1 km (107.6 mi) of narrow gauge) was privately owned. In September 1945 the rolling stock was 678 locomotives (124 steam tank, 446 tender, 99 narrow gauge steam, and 8 electric locomotives), one steam-powered railway crane, 29 powered railcars, 747 passenger cars, and 6,928 freight cars.

The official division of Korea into Soviet and American zones of occupation along the 38th parallel in August 1945 disrupted train service on the (former) Kyŏngwŏn and Kyŏngŭi Lines. However, as early as 26 August, the Soviet army began operating trains on the Kyŏngŭi Line north of Sariwŏn; in the south the US Army Transportation Corps took control of the railways and restarted service on the Kyŏngŭi Line from Tosŏng (north of Kaesŏng) to the south. In May 1946 crossing the 38th parallel without a permit became illegal, and on 9 August 1946 identification cards became necessary for rail travel in the northern part of Korea.

On 10 August 1946 the Provisional People’s Committee for North Korea nationalised all railways in the Soviet occupation zone; everything related to railway operations came under the aegis of the People's Committee for Transportation. The railways were nearly paralysed by a lack of experienced staff as a result of the expulsion of ethnic Japanese – most railway workers, especially the skilled labourers, the locomotive crews, mechanics, engineers, and administrators, were Japanese; to make the situation worse, the Soviet Army plundered a great deal of industrial equipment from northern Korea – factory machines, components for hydroelectric dams, and a large number of locomotives and rolling stock. Passengers resorted to riding on the infrequent freight trains, and even on locomotives.

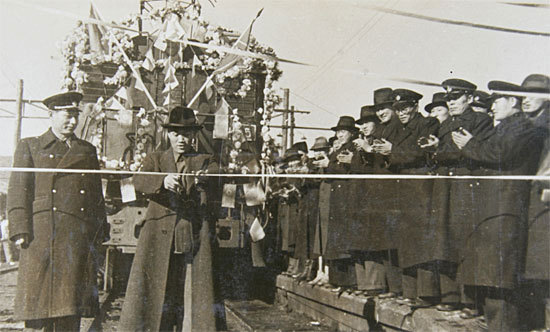
Ceremony commemorating the completion of the electrification of the Yangdŏk–Sinch'ang section of the P'yŏngwŏn Line in 1948.

The Korean State Railway (Kukch'ŏl) was created as a department of the Ministry of Transportation in 1948 after the founding of North Korea. Initially, Kukch'ŏl had 3,767 km (2,341 mi) of functional railway, including the restored electrified Yangdŏk–Sinch'ang–Ch'ŏnsŏng section of the P'yŏngwŏn Line, and the newly electrified Kaego–Koin section of the Manp'o Line.

On 10 December 1947, the assets of the Chosen Government Railway were formally divided between North and South, leaving Kukch'ŏl with 617 steam locomotives (141 tank, 476 tender), 8 electric locomotives, and 1,280 passenger cars and 9,154 freight cars (747 and 6,928 respectively according to other sources).

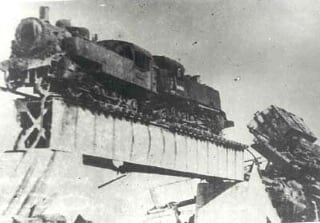
A Japanese-built Purŏp'a (부러파) class locomotive in the DPRK during the Korean War.

Other new construction took place prior to 1950, but the Korean War which broke out on 25 June 1950 interrupted progress. Initially, the Korean People's Army was dominant, occupying most of the Korean Peninsula apart from a small pocket around Pusan; during this time, many railway vehicles, such as DeRoI-class electric locomotives and steam locomotives built in Japan after the end of the war and delivered to South Korea as reparations, were taken to North Korea. At the same time, war aid in the form of locomotives and freight cars arrived from friendly socialist countries such as the USSR, China, Poland, Hungary, and Czechoslovakia. American-led United Nations forces quickly turned the tide of the war, however; by 19 October of the same year had captured P'yŏngyang, and a week later, South Korean troops reached the Yalu River. Throughout the Korean War, much of the railway infrastructure and many of the locomotives were destroyed. On 31 December 1950, a train, consisting of the locomotive Matei 10 and 25 cars, going from Hanp'o to Munsan was ordered to stop at Changdan by the US Army, and was destroyed; the track was also destroyed, after which the Kyŏngŭi Line remained severed for over 50 years. UN forces were quickly pushed back south of the 38th parallel, and by the end of the year the war had become a stalemate; little exchange of territory happened over the next two years of fighting until the Korean Armistice Agreement was signed on 27 July 1953.

=== 1953–1959: Rebuilding from nothing ===
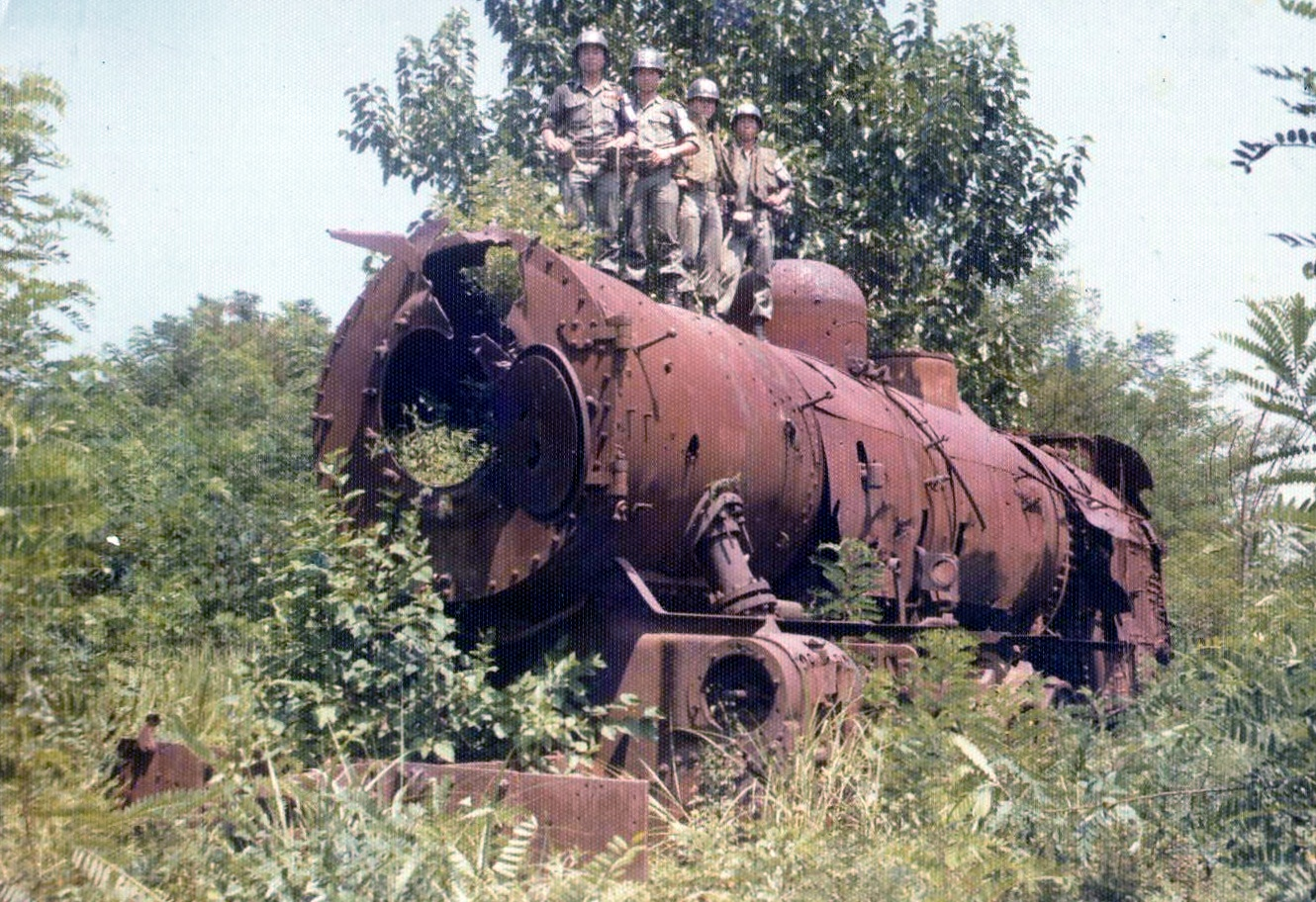
The ruins of steam locomotive Matei 10, destroyed during the Korean War, at Changdan in 1976.

North Korea was left devastated after the war, with damage being even more extensive than in the south. Factories, houses, bridges, roads, and railways were destroyed in heavy US Air Force bombing raids; Pyongyang's tram system had been completely destroyed, to the extent that salvaging it was deemed uneconomical and was abandoned. Reconstruction, however, started already before the end of the war and, with the aid of the Chinese People's Volunteer Corps, by the time the ceasefire was signed 1,382 km (859 mi) of railway lines had been restored. The north's transportation network was so severely damaged that in many places, the horse was the only viable means of transport; consequently, much of the initial reconstruction efforts were focussed on rebuilding the railways - especially the lines connecting the DPRK to China and Russia, in order to ease the shipment of goods from those two countries. However, some new construction did take place, mostly to complete projects interrupted either by the end of Japanese rule or by the Korean War, such as the Tŏkp'al Line, which had been started by the privately owned West Chosen Central Railway in the early 1940s, to run from Tŏkch'ŏn to P'arwŏn, but of which only 12.3 km (7.6 mi) to Changsangri had been completed by war's end; the project was revived after the Korean War and finished to P'arwŏn in 1954. Within three months of the armistice, 308 bridges with a total length of 15,000 m (49,000 ft) were either repaired or newly built by railway corps volunteers, and 37 stations were rebuilt as the railway network was gradually restored to its pre-war status.

Although the USSR did not militarily intervene in the Korean War due to fear of criticism from the United Nations (UN), it played a major and active role in post-war reconstruction. Within the context of an economic and technical assistance agreement worth 1 billion rubles signed between the two countries a railway co-operation agreement was signed, which included a promise to deliver VL19 class electric locomotives to North Korea. China provided 800 million RMB worth of assistance, along with considerable aid from socialist countries in Eastern Europe, especially Poland: between 1954 and 1956, Polish Railway engineers and mechanics assisted in North Korea with the repair of damaged steam locomotives and rolling stock. With extensive Soviet and Chinese assistance, the railways were rebuilt and further expanded. A replacement railway bridge was opened over the Taedong River in P'yŏngyang on 17 June 1954, and three months later, on 25 September 1954 the Kangwŏn Line was reopened between Kosan and P'yŏnggang. The Yalu River Bridge between Sinŭiju and Dandong, China, which had been severely damaged during the war, was rebuilt before war's end.

On 5 February 1954, an agreement signed between China and the DPRK on cross-border train service, and a Beijing-Pyongyang through-train service began on 3 June of that year, using China Railways rolling stock. The connection with the USSR across the Tumen River was first established during the Korean War in the form of a wooden railway bridge opened in 1952; by the mid-1950s this bridge had become insufficient for the traffic on the line, and the Korean-Russian Friendship Bridge between Tumangang and Khasan, USSR was opened on 9 August 1959.

North Korea had inherited a fairly extensive network of 762 mm (30.0 in) narrow-gauge rail lines from both Sentetsu and formerly privately owned railways. One of these was the Hwanghae Line running from Hasŏng to Haeju. After nationalising the Chosen Railway's narrow-gauge lines in the Hwanghae region in April 1944, Sentetsu had decided that traffic levels between Sariwŏn and Hasŏng were sufficient to merit construction of a shorter standard gauge line to replace the existing narrow gauge line; the work was completed quickly, and by September of that year the new, 41.7 km (25.9 mi) "Hwanghae Main Line" was opened. However, the rest of the line from Hasŏng to Haeju remained narrow gauge. The Hwanghae Main Line was, like most other lines, extensively damaged in the Korean War; refurbishment of the Hwanghae Main Line was completed in 1956, and Kim Il Sung visited the reconstruction works in June of that year. Conversion of the Hasŏng—Haeju—Haeju Port section to standard gauge took place in 1958. Work was carried out by youth "volunteer" teams, who finished the project on 12 August 1958 – 75 days after work began. In honour of the efforts of the youth volunteer teams, the Sariwŏn—Haeju line was given its current name, Hwanghae Ch'ŏngnyŏn Line – Hwanghae Youth Line.

In 1956, the railway factories at West P'yŏngyang (today's Kim Chong-t'ae Electric Locomotive Works; it received its present name in 1969 to honour South Korean revolutionary activist Kim Chong-t'ae, a member of the Revolutionary Party for Reunification, who was executed by the South Korean government that year.) and at Wŏnsan (the 4 June Rolling Stock Works) were rebuilt and expanded with Polish assistance. The locomotive factory was reopened on 29 August 1959, while the 4 June Works, manufacturing freight cars as well as repairing steam locomotives and busses, became operational on 15 June 1957. The station building of P'yŏngyang Station, which had been made mostly of wood and had been destroyed during the Korean War, was also rebuilt, with the grandiose stone station building in use today, with a total area of 13,000 m^{2} (140,000 sq ft) being opened in 1957. To train new generations of railway engineers and railway workers, the P'yŏngyang Railway University was opened in September 1959.

Thus, by the end of the 1950s, North Korea's rail network had been restored to what it had been during the period of Japanese rule, with 3,167 km (1,968 mi) of standard gauge and 599 km (372 mi) of narrow-gauge lines once again operational.

=== The 1960s: Electrification and the advances of the Ch'ŏllima Movement ===
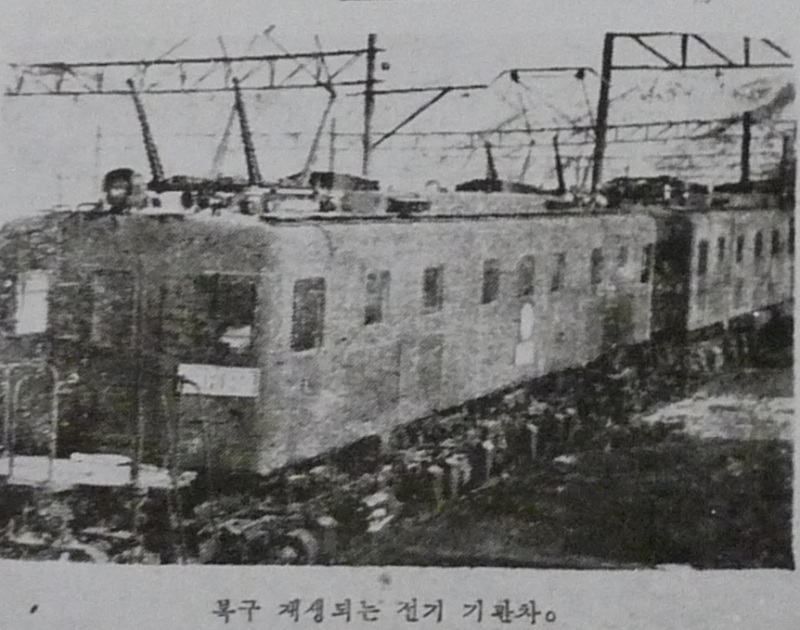
The Japanese-made electric locomotives inherited from Sentetsu played a key early role in reviving and implementing electrification plans.

The 1960s were a breakthrough decade for North Korea. With the reconstruction of damage caused by the Korean War nearly complete, great advances were being made under the Ch'ŏllima Movement, the North Korean equivalent of China's Great Leap Forward; the efforts were both focussed on and aided by the railways. Development was also aided by the fact that, during the colonial era, most Japanese construction of heavy industry including machine manufacturing, as well as the bulk of railway development, took place in the north of the country; the DPRK was also blessed with an abundance of natural resources and a number of large hydroelectric power plants that had also been built by the Japanese. Much of the work done on the railways in this period was focussed on the electrification of trunk lines. Due to the increased importance placed on the railways, by 1965 Kukch'ŏl was transferred from the Ministry of Transport to a newly established Ministry of Railways (조선 민주주의 인민 공화국 철도성, Chosŏn Minjujuŭi Inmin Konghwaguk Ch'ŏltosŏng).

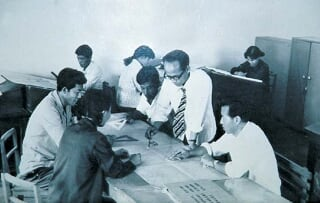
The design team at the Kim Chong-t'ae Electric Locomotive Works at work on designing the Red Flag 1-class locomotive in 1960.

Re-electrification of the Yangdŏk–Ch'ŏnsŏng section of the P'yŏngra Line, which had been initially electrified in 1948 but destroyed during the Korean War, was completed with Soviet assistance on 25 May 1956, but the large-scale electrification of North Korea's rail lines began only in 1958; by the end of the 1960s, nearly 900 km (560 mi) of lines had been electrified, and by 1973, when the electrification of the P'yŏngra Line was completed, over 1,300 km (810 mi) of lines had been electrified, realising the goal of electrifying all major trunk lines. Electrification of the lines was accompanied by the manufacture of electric locomotives. Domestic production of small electric locomotives for use in mines had begun in 1958, but production of mainline electric locomotives didn't start until a few years later. Although the USSR had promised to deliver Soviet-made electric locomotives to North Korea, this never took place, so to supplement the sixteen electric locomotives inherited from Sentetsu, in 1958 Kukch'ŏl ordered ten Type 22E_{2} locomotives from the Škoda Works of Czechoslovakia. This was just a temporary measure, however, as the main goal was the development of a domestically produced electric locomotive. To this end, a licence to build the Škoda Type 30E was bought from Czechoslovakia, including technology transfer, and a number were built to the original design to gain familiarity with the process, but most of the effort was placed on designing the larger, indigenous design. The prototype of the DPRK's first domestically produced mainline electric locomotive, the Red Flag 1, was completed at the Kim Chŏng-t'ae Works (then called the P'yŏngyang Electric Locomotive Works) on 30 August 1961, and Kim Il Sung visited the plant for the occasion and chose the locomotive's name personally. Serial production started in 1962, with twenty built that year, followed by another thirty in 1963; eventually, over 150 were built.

Electrification of Railways in the DPRK
Year	From	To	Line	Distance	Remarks
1944	Pokkye	Kosan	Kyŏngwŏn	53.9	Sentetsu; Destroyed during Korean War.
1948	Yangdŏk	Ch'ŏnsŏng	P'yŏngra	50.8	Destroyed during Korean War
1948	Kaegu	Koin	Manp'o		Destroyed during Korean War
25 May 1956	Yangdŏk	Ch'ŏnsŏng	P'yŏngra	50.8	
1957-62	Miryŏk	Ryŏkp'o	P'yŏngbu	12.0	
1957-62	Susŏng	Komusan	Hambuk	34.3	
1958	Ch'ŏnsŏng	Kowŏn	P'yŏngra	38.0	
1958	Yangdŏk	Sinsŏngch'ŏn	P'yŏngra	40.2	
31 March 1960	Myŏngch'ŏn	Rodong	P'yŏngra	23.3	
1960	Kilju Ch.	Ryongban	P'yŏngra	38.7	
1961	Kimchaek	Kilju Ch.	P'yŏngra	34.3	
1962	Tanch'ŏn Ch.	Kimchaek	P'yŏngra	42.5	
1962	Chiha-ri	P'yŏngsan	Ch'ŏngnyŏn Ich'ŏn	51.4	
1964	Hongwŏn	Tanch'ŏn Ch.	P'yŏngra	127.0	
1964	P'yŏngyang	Sinŭiju	P'yŏngŭi	225.1	
1 November 1968	Kowŏn	Hongwŏn	P'yŏngra	144.5	
10 October 1970	Myŏngch'ŏn	Ch'ŏngjin	P'yŏngra	116.1	
1973	Rajin	Ch'ŏngjin	P'yŏngra	81.2	
1982	Haeju	Hasŏng	Hwanghae Ch'ŏngnyŏn	80.5	

Meanwhile, in order to modernise on non-electrified lines, Kukch'ŏl started ordering diesel locomotives to begin replacing steam power on these lines. The first step towards dieselisation came in 1964, with the arrival of fourteen DVM-4-type locomotives from Ganz-MÁVAG of Hungary, which were used both for shunting and to pull local trains on branchlines. After this positive initial experience with diesel power, an order was placed for larger, more powerful locomotives suitable for use on heavy mainline trains. Made in the USSR to meet a Hungarian requirement, the first two prototypes of the M62-type locomotives appeared on Soviet Railways in 1964 before series production and deliveries to Hungary began in 1965; by the time Kukch'ŏl received their first deliveries of the type - designated K62-class by the factory - in 1967, the M62 had become the backbone of diesel power all over the Comecon world: in addition to Hungary, in 1965 and 1966 the type was put in service in large numbers in Poland, Czechoslovakia, and East Germany. A total of 64 were delivered to North Korea between 1967 and 1974, quickly becoming mainstays on non-electrified lines due to their high performance and ease of use.

Along with the electrification of the trunk lines, construction of new routes was also started in this period. Many of these lines, such as the Unbong Line opened in 1959 to assist with construction of the Unbong Dam, the Pinallon Line opened in 1961 to serve the February 8 Vinylon Complex and the P'yŏngyanghwajŏn Line opened in the same year to serve the Pyongyang Thermal Power Plant were entirely new projects, initially built to aid with the construction of various large-scale industrial and power-generation projects, and some, like the first section of Ch'ŏngnyŏn Ich'ŏn Line from P'yŏngsan to Chihari opened in 1962 as a fully electrified line, were the initial phases of planned new trunk lines. However, many others, though publicised as being entirely at the instigation of the Great Leader, were simply completions of projects initiated by Japanese interests before 1945. The much celebrated completion of the P'yŏngra Line, opened on 10 June 1965 as a shortcut line leading to a significant reduction in travel time between Chongjin and Rajin, was actually just the completion of the Ch'ŏngra Line project started by Sentetsu in 1945, but whose construction was interrupted by the end of Japanese rule. Similarly, the Tŏksŏng Line, opened by Kukch'ŏl on 6 October 1960, was simply an implementation of an unrealised Sentetsu project of the 1940s to extend a line that had been completed as early as 1929, or the Kŭmgol Line, whose completion was announced in 1962, when Kŭmgol was reached; this was, however, only a 3.7 km (2.3 mi) extension to complete a project begun by a private railway in the colonial era, with most of the line (almost 60 km (37 mi)) being opened in 1943. Some of the newly built lines were 762 mm (30.0 in) narrow gauge, such as the 53.7 km (33.4 mi) Ŭnnyul Line opened in 1963 (this was converted to standard gauge in 1971), and the Sŏhaeri Line, opened in 1964 to serve iron ore mines and a small port.

=== The 1970s and 1980s: The golden years ===
In the 1970s, North Korea aimed to further develop the railways through the promotion of science and technology. In the "Six-Year Plan for People's Economic Development" that started in 1971, Kim Il Sung, under the slogan "자력 갱생" (Charyŏk Kaengsaeng, "Self-Reliance"), declared that everything - economy, scientific advance, and development of industrial technology - should be made entirely domestically. Though a considerable amount was achieved through domestic effort, a fair amount of the advances that were made came from foreign sources and were simply relabelled as North Korean. The 1970s and 1980s can be considered as having been North Korea's "golden age", and though it did not last long, considerable successes in the development of the railways were achieved.

A great deal of attention was paid to developing urban transit in this period. After the success of the P'yŏngyang trolleybus system opened in 1962, trolleybus services were inaugurated in Ch'ŏngjin (1970), Hamhŭng (1973), Sinŭiju (1978), and Kowŏn (1979), Nampo (1982), P'yŏngsŏng (1983), Haeju (1986), Anju (1987), and others, along with the opening of the P'yŏngyang Metro in 1973; though most of the trolleybusses were built in North Korea to Czechoslovak and Soviet designs, the metro - despite claims of being entirely of domestic production - used mostly equipment supplied from China. However, as at that time even Seoul had no subway system, its opening was proclaimed to be proof of the superiority of the socialist system.

Expansion and electrification of the national railway system continued as well. New trunk lines were opened, such as the completion of the Ch'ŏngnyŏn Ich'ŏn Line on 10 October 1972, the completion of the Ch'ŏngnyŏn P'arwŏn Line, and the opening of shorter lines intended to serve new mines, power plants and factories, such as the Musan Kwangsan Line (1971), the Ch'ŏnghwaryŏk Line and the Namhŭng Line in 1976, the Sŏhae Kammun Line over the West Sea Barrage on 24 June 1986, and numerous other such lines. Some major projects were initiated, such as the Pukpu Line which was to have been a new east–west transversal trunk line in the very north of the country, but were only partially completed: though work started in 1981, the first stage, from Manp'o to Hyesan was completed only in 1988, but further construction was suspended for over twenty years. Regardless, the Sŏhae Kammun and Pukpu Line projects were the largest railway construction projects that the DPRK undertook entirely on its own. As well as building new lines, several existing narrow gauge lines were converted to standard gauge, and by 1983, 927 km (576 mi) had been regauged.

The electrification of the P'yŏngra Line was finally completed in the 1970s; the project had been started at Yangdŏk in 1948 and completed in stages over the years following the Korean War, until the final section between Rajin and Ch'ŏngjin was energised in 1973. With the electrification of the P'yŏngŭi Line in 1964 and the completion of the P'yŏngra Line project, both of the main trunk lines connecting P'yŏngyang with China and the USSR respectively, became fully electrified. By the end of the 1970s, the goal of eliminating steam power from the primary trunk lines had been achieved, with nearly 87.5% of all railway movements being hauled by electric locomotives by the start of the 1980s, the total length of electrified standard gauge rail lines in North Korea reaching 3,940 km (2,450 mi); additionally, trackage within many industrial complexes was also electrified.

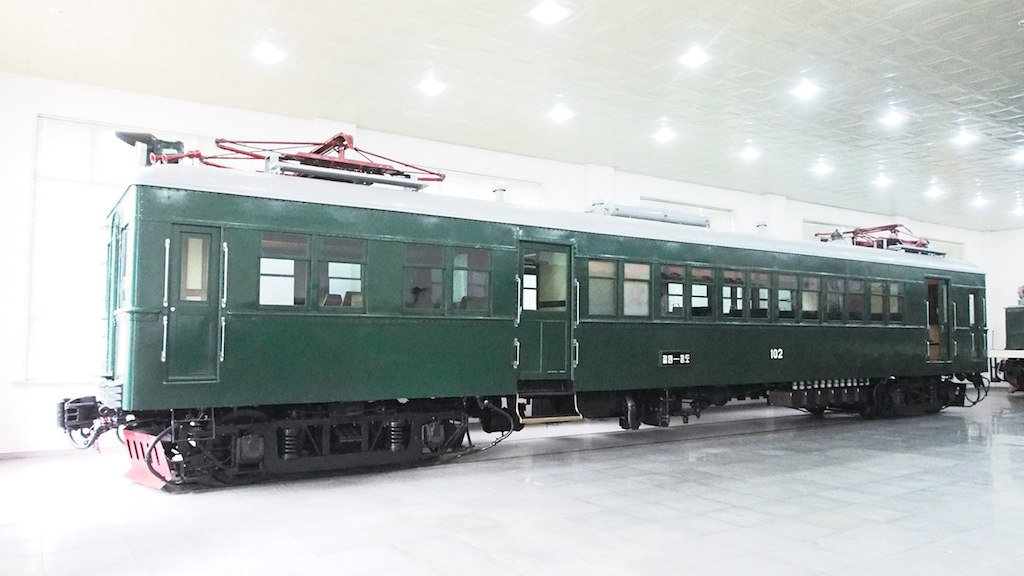
An electric railcar of the Kŭmgangsan Electric Railway preserved at the P'yŏngyang Railway Museum.

As electrification had become a national-level policy, Kukch'ŏl set out to develop new electric motive power. Electric railcars had been used before the war by the Kŭmgangsan Electric Railway, and these were used by Kukch'ŏl until the line was destroyed during the Korean War, and no further electric railcars were used after that for many years. However, the opening of the P'yŏngyang Metro, along with worldwide attention on high-speed electric trainsets such as the Japanese Bullet Train put into service in 1964 and the ER200 class introduced by the Soviet Railways in 1974, led the Railway Ministry to direct efforts towards the development of a high-speed train for North Korea, resulting in the unveiling of North Korea's first electric trainset, the Juche-class EMU, in 1976. Externally, the four-car set was similar in appearance to the 181 series trainsets used by the Japanese National Railways on the Kodama limited express of the day; internally, despite all of North Korea's electrification being 3000V direct current, the Juche-class EMU was built for two-system operation - possibly with a view to future operation in South Korea, where AC electrification was used. Trials were carried out around P'yŏngyang, but no further sets were built, suggesting that the experiment was deemed a failure. The set remained in storage until 1998, when it was refurbished, repainted, and put into use on a daily commuter service for scientists between P'yŏngyang and Paesanjŏm, taking one hour to cover the 38 km (24 mi) distance each way.

Despite the failure of the high-speed train project, development of electric locomotives continued. A particular problem was the lack of sufficient tractive power on heavy freight trains on mountainous lines, and to address this, an 8-axle articulated locomotive was designed. Based on the Red Flag 2 class, the first prototype of the Red Flag 6-class was unveiled in 1981, production began in 1986 and it was put into service in 1987. In technical terms, they were essentially just two permanently-coupled Red Flag 2-class locomotives, representing little innovation over the original design.

=== The 1990s: Planning modernisation, realising decline ===
Thus, though at a slow pace, development of North Korea's railways continued. Entering the 1990s, Kukch'ŏl continued with its plans for electrification of the entire network. After the electrification of part of the narrow gauge Paengmu Line was completed in August 1991, the Sinhŭng Line was electrified in 1992, as was a section of the Ongjin Line; in the same year, a "Railway Modernisation Plan" to further promote development of railway infrastructure was announced. Plans to continue the construction of the Pukpu Line were kept alive; the next stage of this project envisioned the conversion of the existing narrow gauge Samjiyŏn Line to standard gauge, construction of new trackage from Motka, terminus of the Samjiyŏn Line, to Hŭngam on the Paengmu Line, and regauging of the Paengmu Line from Hŭngam to Musan. Although survey work for the new section was begun, the DPRK's financial crisis of the 1990s led to the project being suspended until 2007. The electrification of the Hambuk Line was finished in 1995 with the wiring of the Hoeryŏng–Namyang section, while the electrification of the Kŭmgangsan Ch'ŏngnyŏn Line was completed on 15 April 1997. In 1993, a plan to double track a total of 337 km of lines was started. In the Japanese era, most trunk lines were double tracked; however, needing to rebuild quickly after the extensive destruction of the Korean War, these lines were rebuilt as single track lines - even the most important lines, such as the P'yŏngŭi Line to China. Although work was said to have begun that year, none of the planned double tracking projects has been completed yet. Despite all the lofty plans, between 1990 and 1996 only 67 km (42 mi) of new line was completed; the situation was little better in the second half of the Nineties, with 102 km (63 mi) of new line finished.

On 8 July 1994, Kim Il Sung died, leading to a national mourning period of several years. This, together with the loss of aid money from former allies after the collapse of Communism in eastern Europe and the dissolution of the USSR, as well as major flooding and other natural disasters, led to a period of economic crisis known as the Arduous March; the attempt to overcome this through the introduction of the Sŏngun policy only served to exacerbate the situation. Naturally, this seriously affected the railways as well, leading to severe deterioration of rolling stock and infrastructure, which significantly reduced operational capacity and efficiency, and made timetable operations practically impossible.

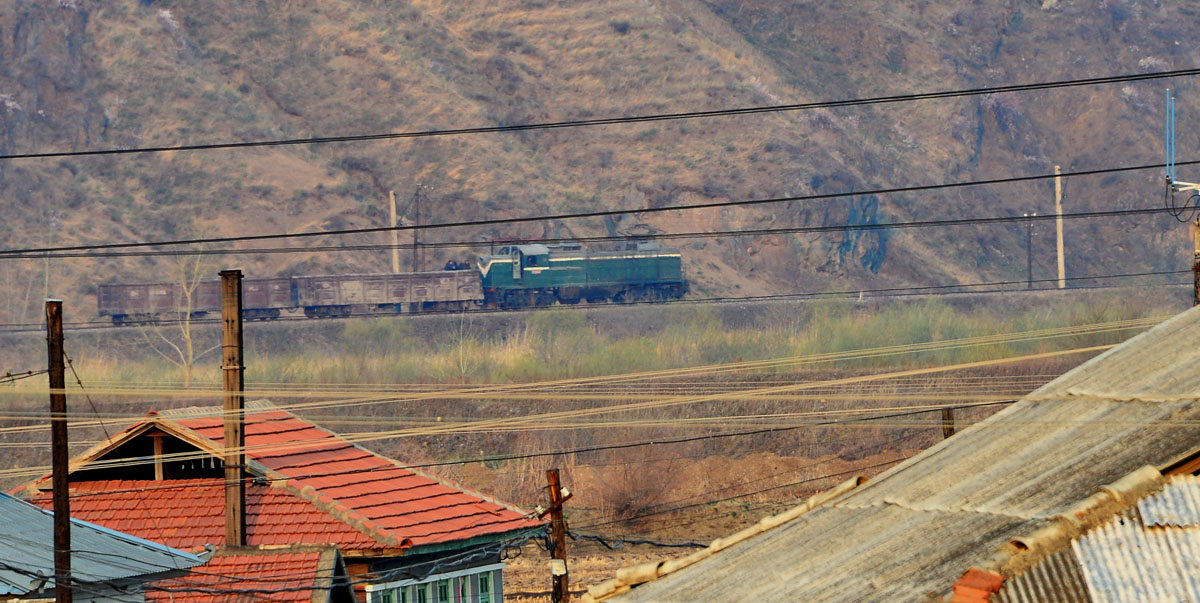
A Soviet-built diesel locomotive in service after conversion to electric operation.

Through the 1990s, investment in rolling stock came to a standstill as well. Although a small number of newly built diesel locomotives were imported from Russia in the first half of the decade, the situation had become so dire that in 1998 Kim Yong-sam, who had replaced Pak Yŏng-sŏk as Minister of Railways in September of that year, announced that due to the critical state of electricity generation in the country, electricity could not be guaranteed for the operation of trains, and consequently the use of steam locomotives would be reinstated on some lines. Despite having reached the end of their service lives years before, Kukch'ŏl was nevertheless forced to rely once again on Japanese-built steam locomotives built before the Liberation of Korea. However, political reasons made it impossible to admit that the country, which only twenty years earlier had been self-sufficient in the production of rolling stock, was unable to supply much-needed new locomotives. Thus, the most decrepit of the K62-class diesel locomotives were converted to electric locomotives by replacing their diesel engines with electric motors, resulting in the Kanghaenggun-class (강행군, 'Forced March'), the first eleven of which were put into service on electrified trunk lines in 1998. For propaganda purposes, these were announced as being new domestically produced locomotives. This was not the only case in which refurbished equipment, or equipment bought second-hand from overseas, was reported as new domestic production: the tram system opened in Ch'ŏngjin in 2002 was announced as using domestically built tram cars (they were in fact bought second-hand from the Czech Republic), and the used passenger cars bought from BLS Lötschbergbahn of Switzerland in the same year were reported as having been built by factory workers in their free time.

=== The 21st century: Reconnecting Korea ===
From 1998, measures to improve economic management and to build a "Strong and Prosperous Nation" were implemented, and slowly the situation in North Korea began to improve - especially as a result of South Korean President Kim Dae-jung's Sunshine Policy of rapprochement with the North. In July 2000, talks began between the two Koreas to discuss the reopening of the former Kyŏngŭi Line that once ran between Seoul and Sinŭiju via P'yŏngyang; this line is now split between the P'yŏngŭi Line in the north running from Sinŭiju to P'yŏngyang and the P'yŏngbu Line from P'yŏngyang via Kaesŏng to the Korean Demilitarized Zone, and Korail's Kyŏngŭi Line, which runs from the DMZ via Torasan to Seoul. Work in the South began almost immediately, and service was restarted on the 6.1 km (3.8 mi) Munsan–Imjingang section of on 30 September 2001, and on the 3.7 km (2.3 mi) Imjingang–Torasan section on 12 February 2002. Groundbreaking ceremonies took place in September 2002 for the reconstruction of the Kaesŏng–Torasan section across the DMZ and the reconnection of the former Tonghae Pukpu Line on the east coast, which is presently split between the North's Kŭmgangsan Ch'ŏngnyŏn Line from Anbyŏn on the Kangwŏn Line via Kŭmgangsan to the DMZ, and the southern section of the former Tonghae Pupkpu line from the DMZ to Chejin. The reconstruction work on these two lines was begun on 14 June 2003.

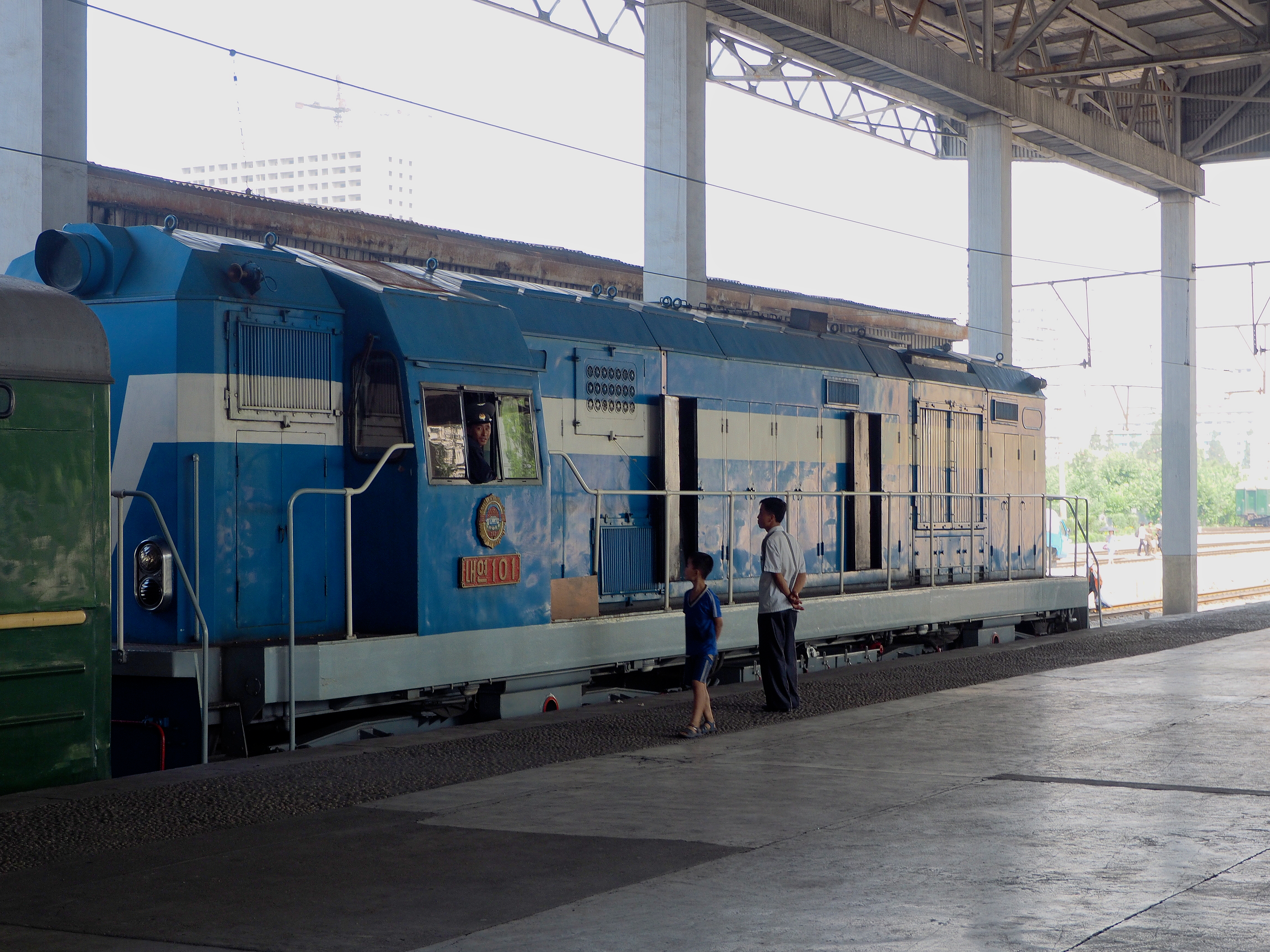
One of the many locomotives bought second-hand from China in the early 2000s, on a passenger train at P'yŏngyang Station. This locomotive is a former Dongfeng 5 series switcher.

The idea of reopening of inter-Korean railway connections attracted attention from the world, especially from China and Russia, as it would enable the realisation of the long-desired Eurasian Land Bridge and Trans-Asian Railway projects. But in the shadow of such lofty visions, North Korea's railways remained in critical condition; to counter this, the government announced the "7.1 Economic Management Improvement Measures" on 1 July 2002, under which a number of reforms like those China had implemented in the 1980s were introduced, such as giving companies more independence, the establishment of joint ventures with foreign investors (mostly Chinese, but also some South Korean), bringing foreign exchange rates closer to reality, increasing wages, etc. However, it also included the raising of prices - a bus ticket that had cost 20 chŏn suddenly increased twentyfold to 1 wŏn; this applied to the railways, too: a ticket from P'yŏngyang to Ch'ŏngjin, which had cost 16 wŏn, went up 37 times, to 590 wŏn. Around the same time, some new locomotives were bought from China, and many second-hand locomotives and freight and passenger cars were bought, mostly from China, but also from Russia, Slovakia, Poland, Germany, and even Switzerland, were brought in to help ameliorate the situation on North Korea's railways. Money was also invested in the reconstruction of railway stations - a completely new station was built at Kaesŏng with South Korean money, whilst P'yŏngyang's central railway station underwent a major renovation in 2005, which included the restoration of walls, the installation of new waiting room doors, and the installation of a large neon sign.

2004 saw the worst known railway disaster in North Korea when an explosion at the station in Ryongch'ŏn destroyed buildings in a large swathe around the city's station, killing 54 and injuring 1,245 people in the blast itself and the subsequent fires, according to official casualty reports. A wide area was reported to have been affected, with some airborne debris reportedly falling across the border in China; the Red Cross reported that 1,850 houses and buildings had been destroyed and another 6,350 had been damaged. The basic restoration of the station was completed within a week, and DPRK–China international train service was reinstated on 28 April.

Although the reconstruction work on the inter-Korean rail lines was nearly complete by March 2006, it wasn't until 17 May 2007, nearly seven years after negotiations on the subject began between North and South, that they were finally reopened. An agreement on cross-border operations had been made between Kukch'ŏl and Korail already in April 2004, but three subsequent attempts to run trains failed, until finally the military authorities on both sides adopted a security agreement on 11 May 2007, allowing the reopening of the lines on 17 May. The reopening consisted of two ceremonial trains, one over the western line from Munsan to Kaesŏng (27 km (17 mi)), and another over the eastern line from Kŭmgangsan to Jejin. The western train was operated from south to north by a Korail locomotive and five coaches, while the eastern train was pulled by a Korean State Railway locomotive and five coaches; each train carried 150 invited guests from the South and the North.

Commercial freight operations were finally restarted on 11 December 2007, with the first train carrying construction materials from Munsan in the South to the Kaesŏng Industrial Region, and footwear and clothing on the return trip to the South. This service, operated by Korail, has been interrupted several times as a result of political events between North and South that have caused the closure of the industrial district. The industrial district was most recently reopened on 16 September 2013 after a five-month shutdown. At the same time, passenger services were reopened on the eastern line to carry passengers to the Mount Kŭmgang Tourist Region, although that service was discontinued in July 2008 after the shooting of a South Korean tourist.

In 2008, an inspection of the railways was carried out by the National Defence Commission, revealing massive corruption, as a result of which Kim Yong-sam was removed from the position and handed over to the State Security Department. He was then replaced by the current Railways Minister, Chon Kil-su, in October 2008. The investigation revealed that railway workers had stripped nearly 100 locomotives held in strategic reserve for wartime use, selling them to China as scrap metal; as the minister responsible, Kim was held accountable and was removed from his post, and was reportedly executed in March 2009.

Also in 2008, work began on the reconstruction of the line between Tumangang Station on the DPRK-Russian border and the port of Rajin, where construction was planned for a new container terminal to handle freight traffic from Asia Pacific countries to Europe, which would cut down considerably on transit time when compared to shipping by sea. This project fits within the framework of a cooperation agreement made between Russia and North Korea in 2000, and is viewed as the first step in the reconstruction of a Trans-Korean mainline, which would allow the shipment of goods by rail all the way from South Korea to Europe. The project included restoring 18 bridges, 12 culverts and three tunnels with a combined length of more than 4.5 km, as well as laying 54 km of four-rail dual gauge (1,435 mm and 1,520 mm) track. A transfer terminal at the port is nearing completion, along with dredging and construction of a quay, storage areas, industrial and office buildings. A single control centre will manage future operations on the line, which will be capable of handling up to 4 million tonnes of cargo per year from the port. Operation and management of the upgraded line, which cost over 5.5 billion rubles (excluding the cost of the port upgrades), will be handled by a joint venture of the Russian Railways and the Port of Rason, which has formally leased the line for 49 years. The upgrade work was officially completed on 22 September 2013.

The second decade of the 21st century has continued the trends of the first, as further new lines have been or are being built, such as a line from Tongrim on the P'yŏngui Line to the Sŏhae Satellite Launching Station in Tongchang. The second stage of the new northern east–west trunk line originally planned in 1980, which was to have run from Hyesan to Musan, was finally partially completed in 2017, when the regauging of the narrow gauge Samjiyŏn Line from Hyesan to Samjiyŏn and Motka was finally finished. The plans to continue extension of that line to Musan and eventually to Hoeryŏng have not been abandoned, but it does not appear that it is being actively pursued at this time.

On 8 December 2013, an agreement was reached between North Korea and a consortium of Chinese companies to construct a high-speed railway connecting Kaesŏng, P'yŏngyang, and Sinŭiju. The project is to be a build-operate-transfer arrangement, in which the construction, scheduled to take five years, will be funded by the consortium, which will then operate the line for 30 years, after which the Railway Ministry will take over operations and complete ownership of the line. The rail line is to be a double-track line of about 400 km (250 mi) with an operating speed of over 200 km/h (120 mph).

On 21 October 2014 a groundbreaking ceremony for the Sŭngri ("Victory") project to modernise the P'yŏngnam Line from Namp'o to P'yŏngyang and the P'yŏngdŏk Line from P'yŏngyang to Chedong was held. The project, supported by Russia, is intended to form the first stage of a larger-scale cooperation with the Russian Railways as part of a 20-year development project that would modernise around 3,500 km (2,200 mi) of the North Korean rail network, and would include the construction of a north–south freight bypass around P'yŏngyang. The overall project cost is estimated to be around US$25 billion, and it is expected that exports of coal, rare-earth and non-ferrous metals from the DPRK to Russia will provide the funding for the project.

In January 2017, a Russian delegation visited Pyongyang to discuss the expansion of cooperation between Kukch'ŏl and the Russian Railways. This included agreements to allow students at the Pyongyang Railway University to enrol at the Far Eastern Federal University in Khabarovsk, and to allow other North Korean railway experts to receive further education at Russian universities.

The Koreas agreed to reconnect and modernize their road and railroad networks at the April 2018 inter-Korean summit. Inter-Korean teams inspected North Korean railroads from November 30 to December 17; the railroads were found to be in poor condition. The Gyeongui Line was inspected from November 30 to December 5, and the Kumgangsan Chongnyon Line from December 8 to 17. The inspections could only proceed after the UN granted exemptions to sanctions at the end of November; American approval followed on December 21. A groundbreaking ceremony for the railroad and road project was held in Kaesŏng on December 26 with each country sending 100 attendees.

== Organisation ==
The Korean State Railway is the operating arm of the North Korean Ministry of Railways. It is divided into five Regional Bureaus: P'yŏngyang, Kaech'ŏn, Hamhŭng, Ch'ŏngjin, and Sariwŏn.

Also subordinate to the Railway Ministry are five major industrial concerns: the Kim Chong-t'ae Electric Locomotive Works in P'yŏngyang, the 4 June Rolling Stock Works in Wŏnsan, the Ch'ŏngjin Railway Factory, the 7.6 Vehicle Parts Factory and the Pyongyang Rolling Stock Repair Works. Of these, the Kim Chong-t'ae Works and the 4 June Works are by far the most important.

There are four research institutes subordinate to the Railway Ministry for scientific research, design review, and the exploration of new technologies for the design and production of rolling stock (the P'yŏngyang Railway University, also subordinate to the Ministry, also takes part in design work and design review), and product inspection; inspection of the products of the factories is also undertaken by the national quality inspection board.

The Railway Ministry also operates a network of sports clubs throughout the country, in sports such as football, basketball, volleyball, tennis, and ice hockey. The Kigwancha Sports Club belongs to the Railway Ministry, which fields teams in the country's top-level basketball, volleyball, and football leagues; in football, the top men's club, based in Sinŭiju, won five national championships between 1996 and 2000 in the DPR Korea League, and took part in the 2017 AFC Cup. The Railway Ministry's top ice hockey club, P'yŏngyang Ch'ŏldo, or "P'yŏngch'ŏl" for short, is one of the most successful clubs in the country, having won the national championship at least eleven times since 1997.

== Operations and infrastructure ==
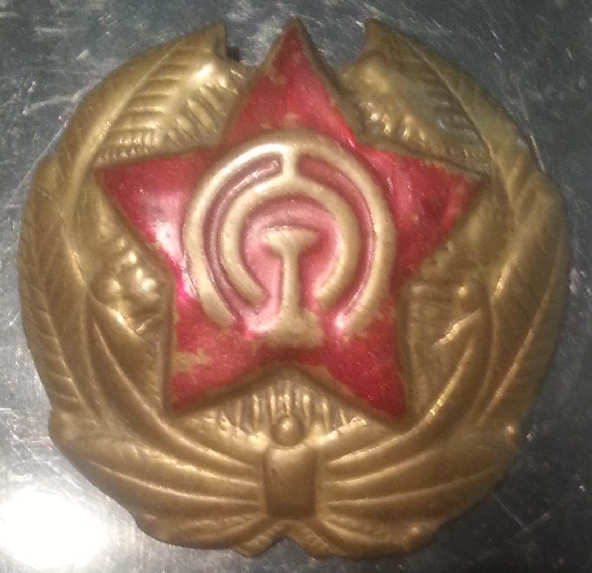
Kukch'ŏl railway worker's cap badge.

The Korean State Railway operates over 5,248 km (3,261 mi) of railway, of which 4,725 km (2,936 mi) is 1,435 mm (4 ft 8 1/2 in) standard gauge, 156 km (97 mi) of 1,520 mm (4 ft 11 27/32 in) broad gauge, and 523 km (325 mi) is 762 mm (2 ft 6 in) narrow gauge Of the total, about 80% is in regular use. 3,893.5 km (2,419.3 mi) of the standard gauge lines are electrified at 3 kV DC and 295.5 km (183.6 mi) of the narrow gauge at 1.5 kV DC. Manual and semi-automatic substations are used, located 15 km (9.3 mi), 30 km (19 mi) or 60 km (37 mi) apart (50 km (31 mi)–60 km (37 mi) apart on the Kangwŏn Line).

Comparison of the Railway Networks in the two Koreas (km)
Category	South	North
Route length	4,285	5,248
Electrification	3,187	4,243
Double-track	2,790	1,016
Single-track	2,037	4,232
Standard gauge	4,285	4,591
Broad gauge	0	134
Narrow gauge	0	523

North Korea's national transportation policy focusses on the railway as the primary means of transport for both passengers and freight. Passenger services include both long-distance trains, as well as commuter services for students and workers; freight transport focusses on industrial raw materials and military traffic, as well as import-export traffic. By putting heavy emphasis on rail transport of goods, by 1983 the amount of traffic transported by rail over an eleven-day period equalled that hauled in the entire year of 1946. Traffic control is by track warrant.

In recent years, emphasis has been placed on moving away from railway to road transport for movements of 150 km (93 mi)–200 km (120 mi) or less, due to the greater cost effectiveness of road transport over short distances.

Railways carry a very large portion of traffic in North Korea:

Comparison of transport in the two Koreas (%)
Type	South	North
Passenger - Rail	15.37	49.1
Passenger - Road	81.59	50.9
Freight - Rail	7.73	92.8
Freight - Road	73.39	7.2

Due to the ageing infrastructure, normal operation is made difficult by chronic power shortages and poor state of infrastructure maintenance. Sleepers, tunnels and bridges are in a critically poor state of repair. Tracks are laid on either wooden or concrete sleepers, using rails of 37, 40, 50, 60 kg/m (75, 81, 101, 121 lb/yd) of domestic, Chinese and Russian manufacture. Riverine gravel and crushed stone ballast is used. Tunnels are of concrete construction; many are in poor condition, having been built during the colonial era. Communications equipment and the semi-automatic signalisation infrastructure dates to the 1970s, and was imported from China and the Soviet Union. The poor state of the infrastructure severely restricts operational speeds - average train speeds are as low as 20 km/h (12 mph)–60 km/h (37 mph) (in South Korea 60 km/h (37 mph)–100 km/h (62 mph) on non-high speed lines): only on the P'yŏngbu Line are speeds of 100 km/h (62 mph) possible.

Average Speeds on the Korean State Railway
Section	Distance (km)	Travel time	Average speed (km/h)	Notes
P'yŏngyang-Tumangang	847.5	20:56	40.5	
P'yŏngyang-Sinŭiju	225.1	3:45	60.0	
Changyŏn-Manp'o	508.4	14:08	36.0	
P'yŏngyang-Hyesan	728.7	18:32	39.7	via Pyongra Line
P'yŏngyang-Hyesan	445.4	19:20	23.0	via Manp'o Line
P'yŏngyang-P'yŏnggang	377.7	10:50	34.9	
P'yŏngyang-Musan	823.5	19:15	42.8	
P'yŏngyang-Hŭich'ŏn	176.2	5:32	32.0	

=== Passenger service ===
The railway provides the primary form of long-distance transport in North Korea.

Although the Soviet Army restarted operation of passenger trains just days after the formal partition of Korea in 1945, it was only after the end of the Korean War that regularly scheduled international trains between the DPRK and China were resumed. An agreement on cross-border train service was signed between the two countries on 5 February 1954, and regular operation of Beijing–P'yŏngyang through trains began four months later, on 3 June, using China Railway rolling stock.

In 1983 the Korean State Railway began operation of P'yŏngyang–Beijing trains as well, using its own rolling stock, and since then Kukch'ŏl and China Railway each operate two weekly round trips between the two capitals. These trains, by far the most important international passenger service in the DPRK, operate via Sinŭiju four times weekly (Monday, Wednesday, Thursday and Saturday). Customs and immigration checks take place at Sinŭiju. The trip takes 22 hours 51 minutes from P'yŏngyang to Beijing, and 23 hours 18 minutes from Beijing to P'yŏngyang. Stops made in the DPRK are at P'yŏngyang, Ch'ŏngju Ch'ŏngnyŏn, Ch'ŏnggang and Sinŭiju Ch'ŏngnyŏn stations. The train is generally composed of eight coaches and one dining car operating between P'yŏngyang and Sinŭiju, two North Korean sleeping cars between P'yŏngyang and Beijing, and three China Railways coaches and one Korean State Railway sleeping car between P'yŏngyang and Dandong, China.

The other major international service is a through train (specifically, a sleeping car) that operates fortnightly between P'yŏngyang and Moscow, which has operated since 1987. This train is generally not open to foreigners other than citizens of Russia as far as Rajin.

There is also an international passenger service from Manp'o to Ji'an, China, in the form of a single passenger car attached to the daily cross-border freight train. This train is not open to use by foreigners other than ethnic Koreans from China.

Other important long-distances trains include amongst others P'yŏngyang - Kilju - Hyesan (721 km (448 mi), P'yŏngyang - Ch'ŏngjin - Tumangang (1,011 km (628 mi)), P'yŏngyang - Ch'ŏngjin - Musan (813 km (505 mi)), P'yŏngyang - Kŭmgol (570 km (350 mi)), P'yŏngyang - Kowŏn - P'yŏnggang (370 km (230 mi)), Haeju - Manp'o (492 km (306 mi)), Haeju - Sariwŏn - P'yŏngyang - Kilju - Hyesan (855 km (531 mi)), Sinch'ŏn - Sariwŏn - P'yŏngyang - Ch'ŏngjin (858 km (533 mi)) and Sinŭiju - Kaesŏng (413 km (257 mi)).

== Routes ==
North Korea has an extensive network of standard and narrow gauge rail lines, roughly forming an H-shape, with an east–west mainline connecting the two north–south mainlines on the eastern and western coasts.

This list shows only the main trunk lines. For secondary standard-gauge lines and narrow-gauge lines, see the main article.

=== Trunk lines ===
- Hambuk Line: Ch'ŏngjin Ch'ŏngnyŏn–Rajin, 331.1 km (205.7 mi), 1,435 mm (4 ft 8.5 in) standard gauge (Hongŭi–Rajin dual gauge with standard and Russian 1,520 mm (5 ft 0 in) broad gauge);
- Hongŭi Line: Hongŭi (Hambuk line) - Tumangang (-> Khasan, Russia), 9.5 km (5.9 mi), dual gauge;
- Kangwŏn Line: Kowŏn (P'yŏngra Line) - P'yŏnggang, 145.8 km (90.6 mi) standard gauge
- Kŭmgangsan Ch'ŏngnyŏn Line: Anbyŏn (Kangwŏn Line) - Kŭmgangsan Ch'ŏngnyŏn (-> Chejin, ROK, 101.0 km (62.8 mi) standard gauge
- Manp'o Line: Sunch'ŏn (P'yŏngra Line) - Manp'o, 299.9 km (186.3 mi) standard gauge
- Paektusan Ch'ŏngnyŏn Line: Kilju Ch'ŏngnyŏn (P'yŏngra Line) - Hyesan Ch'ŏngnyŏn (Pukpu Line), 141.7 km (88.0 mi) standard gauge
- P'yŏngbu Line: P'yŏngyang - Kaesŏng (-> Torasan, ROK), 187.3 km (116.4 mi) standard gauge
- P'yŏngdŏk Line: P'yŏngyang - Kujang Ch'ŏngnyŏn (Manp'o and Ch'ŏngnyŏn P'arwŏn lines), 192.3 km (119.5 mi) standard gauge
- P'yŏngnam Line: P'yŏngyang - Namp'o, 55.2 km (34.3 mi) standard gauge
- P'yŏngra Line: P'yŏngyang - Rajin, 819.0 km (508.9 mi) standard gauge
- P'yŏngŭi Line: P'yŏngyang - Sinŭiju (-> Dandong, China), 225.1 km (139.9 mi) standard gauge

=== Narrow-gauge lines ===
Narrow-gauge lines in North Korea are built to 762 mm (30.0 in) gauge. Some are electrified at 1500 V DC. While there are such lines all over the country, the most important ones are in the northern part of the country. The longest of the narrow-gauge lines in North Korea is the Paengmu Line, which runs 191.7 km (119.1 mi) from Paegam to Musan, connecting the standard-gauge Paektusan Ch'ŏngnyŏn Line with the standard-gauge Musan Line.

== Rolling stock ==
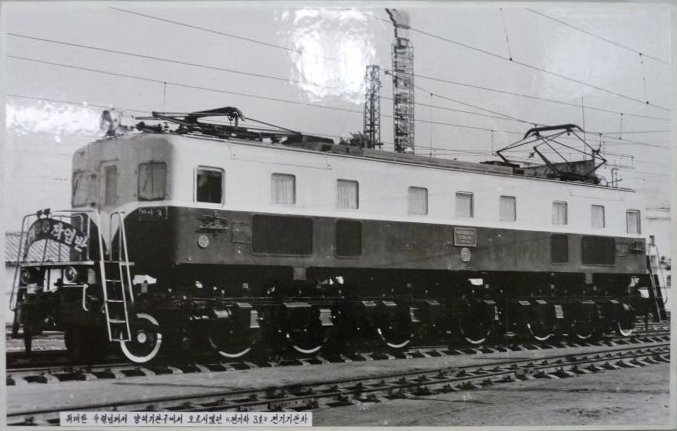
Chŏngiha-class electric locomotive 전기하3, of the first class of electric locomotives in Korea.

The Korean State Railway operates a wide variety of electric, diesel and steam locomotives, along with a variety of electric multiple unit passenger trains. Kukch'ŏl's motive power has been obtained from various sources. Much, mostly steam and Japanese-made electric locomotives, was left over after the end of the colonial era, and this motive power moved the majority of trains between the time of the partition of Korea and the beginning of the Korean War. On 10 December 1947, Kukch'ŏl had 786 locomotives - 617 standard gauge (141 tank locomotives, 476 tender locomotives), 158 narrow gauge locomotives, eight electric locomotives (standard gauge), and three steam cranes; there were also, as of September 1945, 747 passenger cars, 6,928 freight cars and 29 powered railcars in the North - all of these had been inherited from the Chosen Government Railway and the various privately owned railways in colonial Korea.

The Korean War destroyed much of the North's railway infrastructure, but with extensive Soviet and Chinese aid, along with aid from the rest of the Eastern Bloc - mostly in the form of steam locomotives from Hungary, Czechoslovakia, Poland and Romania, North Korea's railways were rapidly rebuilt. During the Ch'ŏllima Movement, North Korea's equivalent to China's Great Leap Forward, Kim Il Sung placed a special emphasis on the electrification of the railways. As a result of this emphasis, many hundreds of kilometres of railway were electrified by the end of the 1950s.

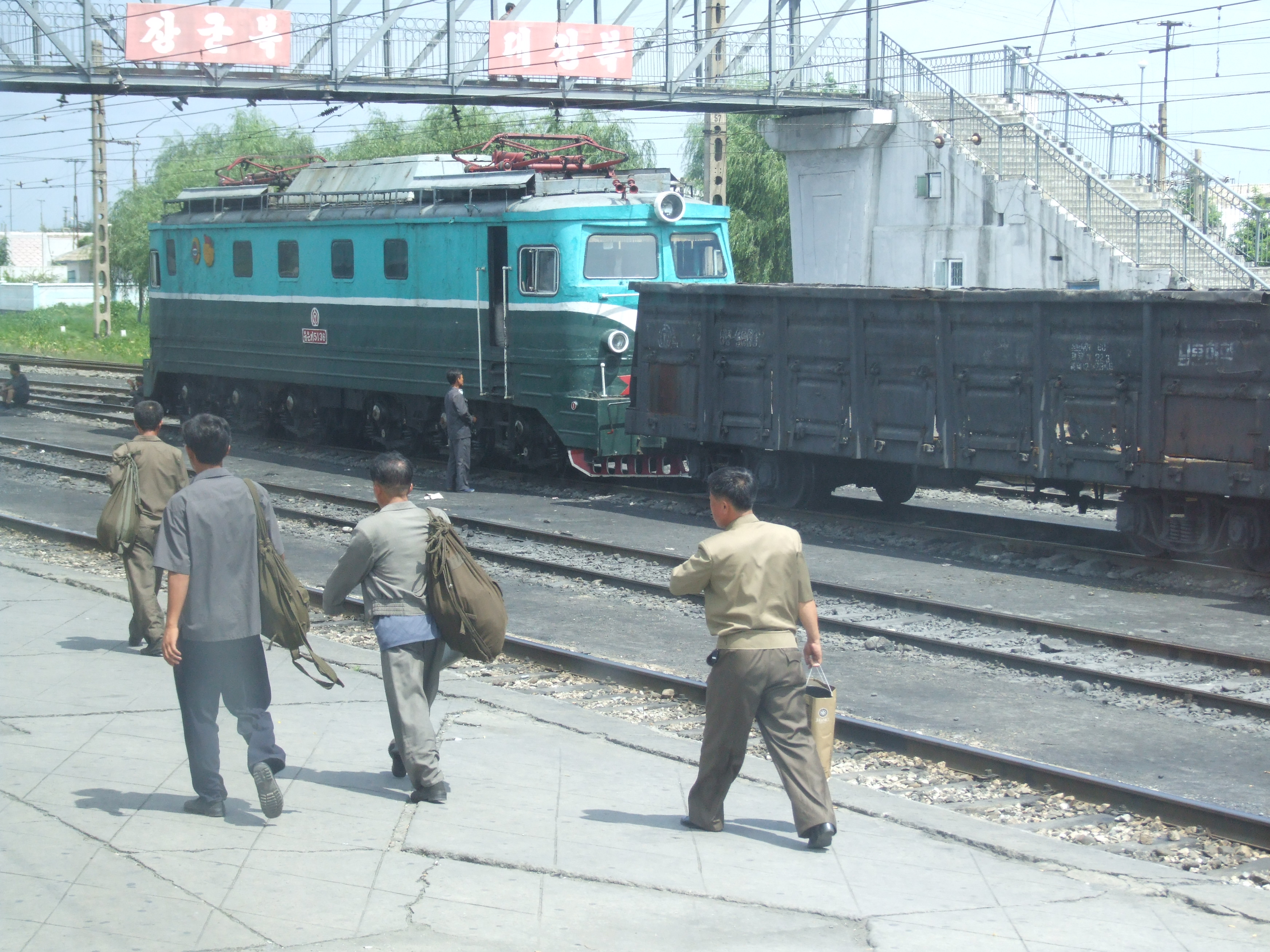
Red Flag 1 class 붉은기5136 in Sinanju.

Another important aspect of the Ch'ŏllima Movement was the further industrialisation of North Korea. In terms of industry, the Japanese legacy was a fairly extensive network of railways connecting steel mills, chemical plants and other heavy industries with the many mines of the north - coal, iron, and many other metal and non-metal resources; all of these were further expanded during the 1950s. In 1945, a rolling stock repair facility in P'yŏngyang, eventually becoming today's Kim Chong-t'ae Electric Locomotive Works, which has manufactured almost all of North Korea's electric locomotives since the first Red Flag 1-class locomotive, North Korea's first domestically produced electric locomotive, was rolled out in 1961.

With ample coal supplies to fire steam locomotives, and electrification of the rail network being expanded rapidly after the Korean War, dieselisation was not the priority for Kukch'ŏl that it was for many other railways, not starting in earnest until the second half of the 1960s with the arrival of the first diesel locomotives from Hungary and the Soviet Union. Once there, though, they have consistently shared the burden with electric and steam locomotives, taking over the latter's share of work on non-electrified lines gradually. Though still in sporadic use, steam had mostly left the North Korean mainlines by the end of the 1970s, and elsewhere by the end of the 1990s.

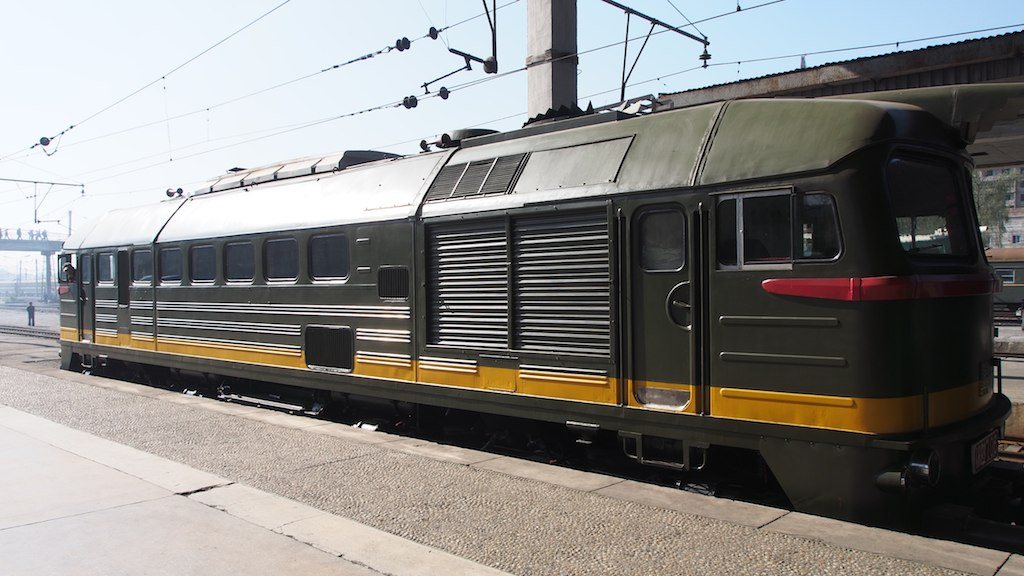
A North Korean M62 diesel at P'yŏngyang Station.

Severe floods in the 1990s had taken their toll on North Korea's hydroelectric generation system, and even some mines had flooded - and due to electricity shortages caused by the silting of the dams, there was often little electricity available to run pumps needed to clear the water out of the mines. By the turn of the millennium, Kukch'ŏl was having difficulties keeping electric trains running, and the fleet of K62s was insufficient to meet the transportation needs, even though demand had been reduced significantly due to ongoing economic difficulties. To alleviate this problem, more M62s from several European countries, along with a sizeable number of second-hand locomotives from China, were imported. At the same time, however, the economic crisis also made it difficult to obtain diesel fuel, and by the late 1990s rail traffic was barely plodding along.

In recent years, extensive work has begun on refurbishing the rail network and power generation capabilities in the country, but diesels continue to play their significant role in hauling passenger and freight trains on the various mainlines, and Kim Jong Un has been placing special emphasis on the refurbishment and modernisation of the railways. Due to ongoing economic difficulties in North Korea, maintenance levels are poor; locomotive serviceability is estimated at 50%. However, recent imports of diesel locomotives from China and construction of newer electric locomotive types are helping to ameliorate the situation.

At the present time the Korean State Railway operates primarily using electric and diesel power, with a wide array of locomotive types. Most numerous and important are the Red Flag 1-class electrics, the Red Flag 6-class articulated electrics for heavy freight trains, and the Kanghaenggun-class electrics, which were converted from diesels; also important are the K62-class diesels, and the various types imported recently from China. Efforts to modernise the motive power stock are also underway, with the continuing construction of Red Flag 5400-class heavy electrics and the latest addition, the Sŏngun Red Flag-class electrics designed to provide greater performance with lower power consumption, along with a program to modernise the K62 diesels with new engines and other upgrades.

In 2002, Swiss-made passenger cars bought second-hand from the BLS Lötschbergbahn entered service on the P'yŏngyang–Hyesan express train, becoming the first Western-made passenger cars to be operated by Kukch'ŏl.

Following Kim Jong Un's instruction to improve the image of the DPRK's railways, Kukch'ŏl's uniformly green passenger cars are being repainted into more colourful schemes.

== Railway links with adjacent countries ==
- China (China Railway) - open - same gauge
- Russia (Russian Railways) - open - break-of-gauge
- South Korea (Korail) - not in regular use - same gauge

== See also ==
- Rail transport in South Korea
- Korail, South Korea's national rail operator
- Korea Rail Network Authority, South Korea's national rail owner

== Sources ==
- Buzo, Adrian (2002). The Making of Modern Korea. London: Routledge. ISBN 0-415-23749-1.
- Kokubu, Hayato (2007). 将軍様の鉄道 (Shōgun-sama no Tetsudō) (in Japanese). Shinchosha. ISBN 978-4-10-303731-6.
