= Hwanghae Line =

Railway line in colonial Korea

Overview
- Native name: 황해선 (黄海線)
- Status: Divided in 1944
- Owner: Chōsen Railway
- Locale: Hwanghae
- Termini: Sariwon; Haeju
- Stations: 63

Service
- Type: Heavy rail, Regional rail Passenger/Freight
- Operator(s): Chōsen Railway

History
- Opened: 1919–1937

Technical
- Line length: 294.3 km (182.9 mi)
- Number of tracks: Single track
- Track gauge: 762 mm (2 ft 6 in)

Hwanghae Line (黄海線, Kōkai-sen) was the name given by the privately owned Chōsen Railway of colonial Korea to its network of railway lines in Hwanghae Province. The name encompassed the mainline from Sariwon to Haeju, along with several connecting branch lines.

== History ==
The first section of what would become the Hwanghae Line was a 15 km (9.3 mi) 762 mm (30.0 in) narrow-gauge line from Sanghae (later Samgang) to Naeto via Hwasan opened by the Mitsubishi Ironworks on 20 May 1919 for use as a private industrial railway. Shortly thereafter, the West Chōsen Development Railway was set up to take over this line, which it did on 21 April of the following year.

Immediately after that, the West Chōsen Development Railway began work on another narrow gauge line, a 21.5 km (13.4 mi) line from Sariwon to Jaeryeong via Sanghae, opening it on 21 December 1920, and on 16 November of the following year it was extended from Jaeryeong to Sincheon, a distance of 13.6 km (8.5 mi).

On 1 April 1923, the West Chōsen Development Railway merged with five other railway companies to form the Chōsen Railway (abbreviated Chōtetsu, to distinguish it from the Chōsen Government Railway, which was known as Sentetsu), taking over all lines and operations of its predecessors. Chōtetsu then grouped the Sanghae—Naeto line together with the Sariwon—Sanghae—Sincheon line it had inherited from the West Chōsen Development Railway, collectively calling them the Hwanghae Line.

Chōtetsu subsequently expanded the Hwanghae Line network significantly, with the first expansion being the 8.0 km (5.0 mi) addition to extend the line from Hwasan to Miryeok, opening the new track on 1 September 1924. A year to the day later Chōtetsu opened the 15.2 km (9.4 mi) Miryeok—Sinwon—Haseong line.

The network remained unchanged over the following four years, but after that there came a flurry of expansions. First, the Sariwon–Sincheon line was extended 29.0 km (18.0 mi) from Sincheon to Sugyo on 1 November 1929, followed on 12 November 1929 by the 22.0 km (13.7 mi) extension Sinwon—Hakhyeon section, and on 11 December 1930 by the 6.4 km (4.0 mi) Hakhyeon—East Haeju section. Less than a year later, Chōtetsu extended the line again, this time with a 7.5 km (4.7 mi) segment from East Haeju to Haeju Port station in Ryongdangp'o.

Chōtetsu then began expanding its network around Haeju. First, a 7.5 km (4.7 mi) line from East Haeju to Haeju Port at Ryongdangp'o was opened on 12 November 1931, after which construction began eastwards from Haeju to create a southern connection to the Gyeongui Line, the state-owned Chōsen Government Railway's main line from Keijō to Sinuiju and on to Andong, Manchukuo. The first section of this new narrow gauge line, from East Haeju to Yeon'an, was opened on 21 December 1931.

The second section involved much more intensive work, as a bridge had to be built across the Ryesong River. Thirty-five girders were supplied by Japanese locomotive manufacturer Kisha Seizō, and the line was finally opened on 1 September 1932, running from Yeon'an across the new bridge to connect to the Gyeongui Line at Toseong (later renamed Gaepung). A 2.3 km (1.4 mi) extension west from East Haeju to Haeju was opened on 1 July 1933. Chōtetsu then added three new stations, opening Seobyeon Station (later renamed Dongpo), 6.1 km (3.8 mi) south of East Haeju, on 11 May 1934 (now called Wangsin), and Sindeok Station between Sinwon and Haseong, 3.5 km (2.2 mi) from Sinwon, on 11 August 1935.

Expansion then headed west from Haeju, with a 19.3 km (12.0 mi) stretch of new line from Haeju to Chwiya that was opened on 11 December 1936. The northwestern area was not left ignored, as just over a month later, a 17.7 km (11.0 mi) extension from Sugyo to Jangyeon was opened on 21 January 1937. Finally, on 10 May 1937 a 0.7 km (0.43 mi) branch was opened from Dongpo to Jeongdo, followed by a 24.2 km (15.0 mi) extension from Chwiya to Ongjin nine days later.

Hwanghae Line Construction Timeline
Date	Section	Length	Original Builder
20 May 1919	Sanghae–Naeto	15.0 km (9.3 mi)	Mitsubishi Ironworks
21 December 1920	Sariwon–Jaeryeong	21.5 km (13.4 mi)	West Chōsen Development Railway
16 November 1921	Jaeryeong–Sincheon	13.6 km (8.5 mi)	West Chōsen Development Railway
1 September 1924	Hwasan–Miryeok	8.0 km (5.0 mi)	Chōsen Railway
1 September 1925	Miryeok–Haseong	15.2 km (9.4 mi)	Chōsen Railway
1 November 1929	Sincheon–Sugyo	29.0 km (18.0 mi)	Chōsen Railway
12 November 1929	Sinwon–Hakhyeon	22.6 km (14.0 mi)	Chōsen Railway
11 December 1930	Hakhyeon–East Haeju	6.4 km (4.0 mi)	Chōsen Railway
12 November 1931	East Haeju–Haeju Port	7.5 km (4.7 mi)	Chōsen Railway
21 December 1931	East Haeju–Yeon'an	45.1 km (28.0 mi)	Chōsen Railway
21 December 1931	Cheongdan–Deokdal	12.7 km (7.9 mi)	Chōsen Railway
1 September 1932	Yeon'an–Toseong	34.1 km (21.2 mi)	Chōsen Railway
1 July 1933	Haeju–East Haeju	2.3 km (1.4 mi)	Chōsen Railway
11 December 1936	Haeju–Chwiya	19.3 km (12.0 mi)	Chōsen Railway
21 January 1937	Sugyo–Jangyeon	17.7 km (11.0 mi)	Chōsen Railway
10 May 1937	Dongpo–Jeongdo	0.7 km (0.43 mi)	Chōsen Railway
19 May 1937	Chwiya–Ongjin	24.2 km (15.0 mi)	Chōsen Railway

Chōtetsu sold the Hwanghae Line network to Sentetsu on 1 April 1944, which absorbed the Hwanghae Line network and split it up, giving each section a new name:

- Cheongdan–Deokdal (12.7 km (7.9 mi)) → Deokdal Line
- Sinwon–Haseong (0.4 km (0.25 mi)) → Haseong Line
- Samgang–Jangyeon (68.9 km (42.8 mi)) → Jangyeon Line
- Dongpo–Jeongdo (0.7 km (0.43 mi)) → Jeongdo Line
- Hwasan–Naeto (2.1 km (1.3 mi)) → Naeto Line
- Haeju–Ongjin (43.5 km (27.0 mi)) → Ongjin Line
- Sariwon—Hwasan—Sinwŏn—Haeju (89.8 km (55.8 mi)) → Sahae Line
- East Haeju–Toseong (79.7 km (49.5 mi)) → Tohae Line

Deciding that traffic levels merited the construction of a standard gauge line, Sentetsu built a new, 41.7 km (25.9 mi) line from Sariwon to Haseong, calling it the Hwanghae Main Line. The opening of a new station in Haseong led to the existing station on the narrow gauge line from Sinwon to be renamed "Guhaseong Station" ("Old Haseong Station").

After the end of the Pacific War and the subsequent partition of Korea, most of the former Hwanghae Line network was located in North Korea and was taken over by the Korean State Railway. However, most of the Tohae Line was located in the US zone of occupation that later became South Korea, with the line being divided along the 38th Parallel between Jangbang and Galsan, and the Korean National Railroad operated passenger trains on the line between Tosŏng and Ch'ŏngdan until 1950. After the end of the Korean War, the entirety of the former Hwanghae Line network was within North Korea.

== Services ==
In the November 1942 timetable, the last issued prior to the start of the Pacific War, Chōtetsu operated an extensive schedule of third-class-only local passenger services:

Sariwon ~ Jangyeon
Distance (read down)	Price Korean yen	-	-	-	Station name	Distance (read up)	Price Korean yen	-	-	-
0.0	-	06:45	11:50	18:35	Sariwon	81.8	2.90	09:45	15:54	20:52
81.8	2.90	10:07	15:27	21:47	Jangyeon	0.0	-	06:10	12:25	17:35

Sariwon ~ Haeju
Distance (read down)	Price Korean yen	-	-	-	-	Station name	Distance (read up)	Price Korean yen	-	-	-	-
0.0	-	08:30	12:00	15:05	18:25	Sariwon	73.3	2.60	09:28	12:49	16:09	19:35
73.3	2.60	11:14	15:00	18:00	21:10	Haeju	0.0	-	06:50	10:05	13:25	16:50

Toseong ~ Haeju
Distance (read down)	Price Korean yen	-	-	-	-	-	Station name	Distance (read up)	Price Korean yen	-	-	-	-	-	-
0.0	-	08:40	11:43	13:45	16:15	19:35	Toseong	81.5	2.90	09:06	11:09	14:10	17:00	19:16	20:56
81.5	2.90	11:31	14:57	17:00	19:12	22:25	Haeju	0.0	-	06:20	08:25	11:20	14:05	16:25	18:00

East Haeju ~ Ongjin
Distance (read down)	Price Korean yen	-	-	-	-	-	Station name	Distance (read up)	Price Korean yen	-	-	-	-	-
0.0	-	08:15	11:45	15:20	17:20	19:35	East Haeju	42.6	1.55	07:40	08:15	10:21	13:15	20:05
42.6	1.55	09:48	13:18	16:53	18:54	21:35	Ongjin	0.0	-	06:00	06:30	07:50	11:30	18:20

East Haeju ~ Haeju Port/Jeongdo
Distance (read down)	Price Korean yen	71	73	505	75	-	77	509	79	81	Station name	Distance (read up)	Price Korean yen	72	74	508	76	-	78	512	80	82
0.0	-	06:50	08:40	09:30	11:40	13:00	15:15	16:55	17:30	21:10	East Haeju	7.4; 6.8	0.25	07:46	09:49	11:00	12:36	15:05	16:01	18:30	18:46	22:06
6.1	0.25	07:07	08:53	09:51	11:53	13:21	15:28	17:16	17:43	21:23	Dongpo	1.3; 0.7	0.25	07:34	09:34	10:40	12:24	14:10	15:49	18:10	18:34	21:54
7.4	0.25	07:10	08:56	↓	11:56	...	15:31	↓	17:46	21:26	Haeju Port	0.0	-	07:30	09:30	↑	12:20	...	15:45	↑	18:30	21:50
6.8	0.25	...	...	09:55	...	...	...	17:20	...	...	Jeongdo	0.0	-	...	...	10:30	...	...	...	18:00	...	...

Hwasan ~ Naeto
Distance (read down)	Price Korean yen	-	-	-	Station name	Distance (read up)	Price Korean yen	-	-	-
0.0	-	08:40	13:00	18:45	Hwasan	2.1	0.15	09:18	13:28	19:18
2.1	0.15	08:53	13:08	18:53	Naeto	0.0	-	09:10	13:20	19:10

== Routes ==
Main line Sariwon–Haeju Port (to Sentetsu Sahae Line)
Distance		Station name				
Total; km	S2S; km	Transcribed, Korean	Transcribed, Japanese	Hunminjeongeum	Hanja/Kanji	Connections
0.0	0.0	Sariwon	Shariin	사리원	沙里院	Sentetsu Gyeongui Line
1.5	1.5	Seosariwon; West Sariwon	Nishi-Shariin	서사리원	西沙里院	
3.6	2.1	Migok	Bikoku	미곡	嵋谷	
8.1	4.5	Seojong	Seishō	서종	西鐘	
11.9	3.8	Sanghae; Samgang (from 1940)	Jōkai; Sankō	상해 삼강	上海 三江	Jangyeon Line
17.9	6.0	Gwangtan	Kōtan	광탄	広灘	
22.7	4.8	Seoktan	Sekitan	석탄	石灘	
24.8	2.1	Hwasan	Kazan	화산	花山	Naeto Line
28.1	3.3	Jangsusan	Chōjuzan	장수산	長寿山	
32.8	4.7	Miryeok	Miryoku	미력	未力	
42.5	9.7	Sinwon	Shin'in	신원	新院	Haseong Line
49.4	6.9	Yeomtan	Entan	염탄	塩灘	
57.7	8.3	Sinjumak	Shinshubaku	신주막	新酒幕	
64.5	6.8	Hakhyeon	Kakken	학현	鶴峴	
70.9	6.4	Donghaeju; East Haeju	Higashi-Kaishū	동해주	東海州	Tohae Line
74.0	3.1	Cheongyang	Seiyō	청양	青陽	opened 1937
77.0	3.0	Dongpo	Tōho	동포	東浦	Jeongdo Line
78.4	1.4	Haejuhang	Kaishūkō	해주항	海洲港	

Samgang–Jangyeon (to Sentetsu Jangyeon Line)
Distance		Station name				
Total; km	S2S; km	Transcribed, Korean	Transcribed, Japanese	Hunminjeongeum	Hanja/Kanji	Connections
0.0	0.0	Sanghae; Samgang (from 1940)	Jōkai; Sankō	상해 삼강	上海 三江	Sahae Line
4.1	4.1	Geumsan	Kinzan	금산	金山	
9.6	5.5	Jaeryeong	Sainei	재령	載寧	
13.1	3.5	Baekseok	Hakuseki	백석	白石	
17.1	4.0	Changchon	Sōson	창촌	倉村	
20.5	3.4	Sincheon Oncheon	Shinsen Onsen	신천온천	信川温泉	
23.2	2.7	Sincheon	Shinsen	신천	信川	
29.4	6.2	Yongmun	Ryūmon	용문	竜門	
34.3	4.9	Munhwa	Bunka	문화	文化	
39.8	5.5	Samcheon Oncheon	Sansen Onsen	삼천온천	三泉温泉	
43.3	3.5	Gungheung	Kyūkyō	궁흥	弓興	
46.5	3.2	Yangchon	Yason	야촌	野村	
52.2	5.7	Sugyo	Suikyō	수교	水橋	
56.9	4.7	Songhwa Oncheon	Shōka Onsen	송화온천	松禾温泉	
62.5	5.6	Naksan	Rakuzan	낙산	楽山	
65.9	3.4	Nakdo	Rakudō	낙도	楽道	
69.9	4.0	Jangyeon	Chōen	장연	長淵	

Hwasan–Naeto (to Sentetsu Naeto Line)
Distance		Station name				
Total; km	S2S; km	Transcribed, Korean	Transcribed, Japanese	Hunminjeongeum	Hanja/Kanji	Connections
0.0	0.0	Hwasan	Kazan	화산	花山	Sahae Line
2.1	2.1	Naeto	Naito	내토	內土	

Sinwon–Haseong (to Sentetsu Haseong Line)
Distance		Station name				
Total; km	S2S; km	Transcribed, Korean	Transcribed, Japanese	Hunminjeongeum	Hanja/Kanji	Connections
0.0	0.0	Sinwon	Shin'in	신원	新院	Sahae Line
3.5	3.5	Sindeok	Shintoku	신덕	新德	
5.5	2.0	Haseong	Kasei	하성	下聖	

Toseong–Haeju (to Sentetsu Tohae Line)
Distance		Station name				
Total; km	S2S; km	Transcribed, Korean	Transcribed, Japanese	Hunminjeongeum	Hanja/Kanji	Connections
0.0	0.0	Toseong	Dojō	토성	土城	Sentetsu Gyeongui Line
6.9	6.9	Yesonggang	Reiseikō	예성강	禮成江	
12.2	5.3	Seongho	Seiko	성호	星湖	
17.2	5.0	Baecheon Oncheon	Hakusen Onsen	배천온천	白川温泉	
21.0	3.8	Honghyeon	Kōken	홍현	紅峴	
24.6	3.6	Mugu	Bukyū	무구	無仇	
28.6	4.0	Yeon'an Oncheon	En'an Onsen	연안온천	延安温泉	
34.1	5.5	Yeon'an	En'an	연안	延安	
39.8	5.7	Bongseo	Hōsei	봉서	鳳西	
45.5	5.7	Pungcheon	Hōsen	풍천	楓川	
50.5	5.0	Cheontae	Tentai	천태	天台	
55.2	4.7	Singye	Shinkei	심계	深桂	
58.7	3.5	Cheongdan	Seitan	청단	青丹	Deokdal Line
62.9	4.2	Naeseong	Raijō	내성	來城	
67.7	4.8	Cheon'gyeol	Senketsu	천결	泉決	
74.3	6.6	Yeongyang	Geiyō	영양	迎陽	
79.2	4.9	Donghaeju; East Haeju	Higashi-Kaishū	동해주	東海州	Sahae Line
81.5	2.3	Haeju	Kaishū	해주	海州	Ongjin Line

Cheongdan–Deokdal (to Sentetsu Deokdal Line)
Distance		Station name				
Total; km	S2S; km	Transcribed, Korean	Transcribed, Japanese	Hunminjeongeum	Hanja/Kanji	Connections
0.0	0.0	Cheongdan	Seitan	청단	青丹	Tohae Line
4.3	4.3	Hwayang	Kayō	화양	花陽	
12.7	8.4	Deokdal	Tokutatsu	덕달	徳達	

Dongpo–Jeongdo (to Sentetsu Jeongdo Line)
Distance		Station name				
Total; km	S2S; km	Transcribed, Korean	Transcribed, Japanese	Hunminjeongeum	Hanja/Kanji	Connections
0.0	0.0	Dongpo	Tōho	동포	東浦	Ongjin Line
0.7	0.7	Jeongdo	Teitō	정도	鼎島	

Haeju–Ongjin (to Sentetsu Ongjin Line)
Distance		Station name				
Total; km	S2S; km	Transcribed, Korean	Transcribed, Japanese	Hunminjeongeum	Hanja/Kanji	Connections
0.0	0.0	Haeju	Kaishū	해주	海州	Tohae Line
1.0	1.0	Cheongyang	Seiyō	청양	青丹	Sahae Line
2.9	2.9	Dongpo	Tōho	동포	東浦	Jeongdo Line
7.0	4.1	Seohaeju; West Haeju	Nishi-Kaishū	서해주	西海州	
10.8	3.7	Seoseok	Seiseki	서석	西席	
19.3	8.5	Chwiya	Suiya	취야	翠野	
22.3	3.0	Gukbong	Kikuhō	국봉	菊峰	
26.8	4.5	Jangdun	Chōton	장둔	長屯	
34.2	7.4	Sin'gangnyeong	Shinkōrei	신강령	新康翎	
40.1	5.9	Naengjeong	Reisei	냉정	冷井	
43.5	3.4	Ongjin	Ōshin	옹진	甕津	
