= Sohaeri Line =

Railway line in North Korea

Sŏhaeri Line

Overview
- Other name: Ryongjŏng Line
- Native name: 서해리선 (西海里線) 룡정선 (龍井線)
- Status: Closed
- Owner: Korean State Railway
- Locale: South Hwanghae
- Termini: Ch'ŏlgwang; Ryongjŏng
- Stations: 4

Service
- Type: Regional rail, Freight rail
- Operator: Korean State Railway

History
- Opened: 1964
- Closed: 2002

Technical
- Line length: 10.1 km (6.3 mi)
- Number of tracks: Single track
- Track gauge: 762 mm (2 ft 6 in)

- Sohaeri Line
- Hangul: 서해리선
- Hanja: 西海里線
- RR: Seohaeriseon
- MR: Sŏhaerisŏn

The Sŏhaeri Line or Ryongjŏng Line is a closed non-electrified 762 mm (2 ft 6 in) narrow-gauge railway line of the Korean State Railway in South Hwanghae Province, North Korea, running from Ch'ŏlgwang at the junction of the Ŭnnyul and Sŏhae Kammun lines to Ryongjŏng.

== History ==
After the end of the Korean War the Railway Ministry of the DPRK began to expand and improve its network, including in South Hwanghae, leading to the opening of a new narrow-gauge line from Sugyo to Ch'ŏlgwang in 1963. With the opening of the new line, the Sariwŏn—Sugyo—Ch'ŏlgwang line was named Ŭnnyul Line, leaving the Changyŏn Line as just the short branch from Sugyo to Changyŏn.

In 1964, another new narrow-gauge line was opened from Ch'ŏlgwang, to serve the iron ore mines around Sŏhaeri and the port at Ryongjŏng. This 10.1 km (6.3 mi) line was the Sŏhaeri Line.

In 1971, a new standard gauge line was opened from Ŭnp'a on the former Sahae Line to Chaeryŏng, and at the same time, the Chaeryŏng—Sinch'ŏn—Sugyo section was converted to standard gauge. The opening of the new standard gauge line from Ŭnp'a to Chaeryŏng led to the closure of the narrow gauge Sariwŏn—Chaeryŏng line. The regauging of the rest of the line from Sugyo to Ch'ŏlgwang was completed in 1973, but the Sŏhaeri Line was left as a narrow-gauge line.

== Services ==
At its peak the line carried 6,000 tonnes of ore daily. Besides the frequent trains to stations, there were 12 daily round trips to the port, each train consisting of 21 self-unloading hoppers. The line has been out of use since 2002.

== Route ==
The orange background in the "Distance" box indicates that section of the line is not electrified narrow-gauge.

Distance (km)		Station Name		Former Name		
Total	S2S	Transcribed	Chosŏn'gŭl (Hanja)	Transcribed	Chosŏn'gŭl (Hanja)	Connections
0.0	0.0	Ch'ŏlgwang	철광 (鐵礦)			Ŭnnyul Line, Sŏhae Kammun Line
		Sŏhaeri	서해리 (西海里)			Closed
		Chŏngmunch'on	정문촌 (正門村)			Closed
10.1		Ryongjŏng	룡정 (龍井)			Closed
