= List of passenger train services in North Korea =

This is a list of all of the numbered passenger train services operated by the Korean State Railway, separated by train class. Even/odd pairs indicate train trips in opposing directions, the most recent comprehensive schedules are from 2002. Trains confirmed only by another source are marked in blue.

== Express trains (Numbers 0-99) ==
Train Numbers	Terminuses	Train lines used	Notes
1, 2	Pyongyang - Hyesan	Pyongra Line, Paektusan Chongnyon Line	Via Hamhung
3, 4	Pyongyang - Manpo - Hyesan	Pyongra Line, Manpo Line, Pukbunaeryuk Line	
5, 6	Pyongyang - Beijing	Pyongui Line	A 2018 schedule only shows this pair of trains going as far as Sinuiju, at the border. Trains 5 and 6 also appear in a photo at Sinuiju station.
7, 8	Pyongyang - Moscow	Pyongra Line, Hambuk Line, Hongui Line	A 2018 schedule only shows this pair of trains going as far as Tumangang, at the border.
9, 10	Pyongyang - Musan	Pyongra Line, Hambuk Line, Musan Line	
11, 12	Pyongyang - Kumgol	Pyongra Line, Kumgol Line	A 2018 schedule shows this pair of trains going slightly further, to Taehŭng.
13, 14	Pyongyang - Pyonggang	Pyongra Line, Kangwon Line	
15, 16, 17, 18	Haeju - Manpo	Hwanghae Chongnyon Line, Pyongbu Line, Pyongra Line, Manpo Line	
19, 20	Pyongyang - Huichon	Pyongui Line, Kaechon Line, Manpo Line	A 2018 schedule shows this pair of trains going all the way to Manpo.
21, 22	Pyongyang - Myohyangsan	Pyongui Line and Kaechon Line or Pyongra Line, Manpo Line	From a 2018 schedule.
23, 24	Pyongyang - Chongjin	Pyongra Line	From a 2018 schedule.
25, 26, 27, 28	Onsong - Haeju	Hambuk Line, Pyongra Line, Pyongbu Line, Hwanghae Chongnyon Line	From a 2018 schedule.
34, 35, 36, 37	Sinuiju - Sariwon <Interior division>	Pyongui Line, Pyongbu Line	From a 2018 schedule. Trains 34 and 37 appear in a photo at Sinuiju station.
51, 52	Pyongyang - Sinuiju (International)	Pyongui Line	From a 2018 schedule. Appears in a photo at Sinuiju station.
53, 54	Pyongyang - Sinuiju (Tourist)	Pyongui Line	From a 2018 schedule.
55, 56	Pyongyang - Tumangang (Rajin) <Interior division>	Pyongra Line	From a 2018 schedule.
64, 65, 66, 67	Haeju - Pyongyang - Songdowon	Hwanghae Chongnyon Line, Pyongbu Line, Pyongra Line, Kangwon Line	From a 2019 schedule. Trains 65 and 66 are also shown in a 2018 schedule, running only between Pyongyang and Songdowon.
68	Haeju - Pyongyang	Hwanghae Chongnyon Line, Pyongbu Line	From a 2019 schedule.
69, 74	Pyongyang - Chongjin	Pyongra Line	From a 2019 schedule.
70, 71, 72, 73	Chongjin - Songdowon	Pyongra Line, Kangwon Line	From a 2019 schedule.
85, 86	Pyongyang - Sinuiju (Tourist)	Pyongui Line	From a 2018 schedule.

== Semi-express trains (Numbers 100-199) ==
Train Numbers	Terminii	Train lines used	Notes
101, 102	Hyesan - Kilju	Paektusan Chongnyon Line	
104, 107, 108, 111	Haeju - Hyesan	Hwanghae Chongnyon Line, Pyongbu Line, Chongnyon Ichon Line, Kangwon Line, Pyongra Line, Paektusan Chongnyon Line	
113, 114	West Pyongyang - Onsong	Pyongra Line, Hambuk Line	
115, 116	Pyongyang - Chongsu	Pyongui Line, Pyongbuk Line	
117, 118	Pyongyang - Pyonggang	Pyongra Line, Kangwon Line	
119, 120, 121, 122	Chongjin - Sinchon	Pyongra Line, Pyongbu Line, Unnyul Line	
124, 125, 126, 127	Chongjin - Sinuiju	Pyongra Line, Pyongdok Line, Manpo Line, Kaechon Line, Pyongui Line	Trains 123 and 124 appear in a photo at Sinuiju station.
128, 129, 130, 131, 132, 133	Kalma - Rajin	Kangwon Line, Pyongra Line	
134, 135, 136, 137	Hamhung - Manpo	Pyongra Line, Manpo Line	
138, 139, 140, 141	Manpo - Changyon	Manpo Line, Pyongdok Line, Pyongbu Line, Unnyul Line, Changyon Line	
142, 143, 144, 145	Sinuiju - Kaesong	Pyongui Line, Pyongbu Line	Trains 142 and 145 appear in a photo at Sinuiju station.
146, 147, 148, 149	Nampo - Sinuiju	Pyongnam Line, Pyongui Line	

== Regional trains (Numbers 200-299) ==
Sometimes referred to as "Long distance trains".

Train Numbers	Terminii	Train lines used	Notes
200, 201	Pyongyang - Chongsu	Pyongui Line, Pyongbuk Line	Also shown in a 2018 schedule
202, 203, 204, 205, 206, 207	Hamhung - Sariwon	Pyongra Line, Pyongbu Line	
208, 211	Sinuiju - Nampo	Pyongui Line, Pyongnam Line	From a photo of the train arrivals/departures board in Sinuiju.
219, 220	Pyongyang (Taedonggang station) - Cholgwang	Pyongbu Line, Unnyul Line	
222, 223, 224	Pyongyang (Kalli station) - Kaesong	Pyongbu Line	
225, 230	Pyongyang (Potonggang station) - Pyongnam Onchon	Pyongnam Line	
226, 227, 228, 229	Tokchon - Pyongnam Onchon	Pyongdok Line, Pyongnam Line	
231, 232	Pyongyang (Taedonggang station) - Tokchon	Pyongdok Line	
236, 237, 238, 239	Sariwon - Tokchon	Pyongbu Line, Pyongdok Line	
240, 241, 242, 243	Nampo - Haeju	Pyongnam Line, Pyongbu Line, Hwanghae Chongnyon Line	
244, 245, 246, 247	Haeju-Cholgwang	Hwanghae Chongnyon Line, Unnyul Line	
249, 250	Pyongyang - Sogam	Pyongui Line	2018 schedule shows trains 248 and 249 between Pyongyang and T'aegam. The station Sogam may have been renamed to match the nearby T'aegam cooperative farm.
250, 251, 252, 253	Sinuiju - Huichon	Pyongui Line, Kaechon Line, Manpo Line	Trains 250 and 253 appear in a photo at Sinuiju station.
261, 262	Hamhung - Samgi	Pyongra Line, Toksong Line	
263, 264	Hamhung - Tanchon	Pyongra Line	
283, 284	Ranam - Bangjin	Pyongra Line	From a 2019 schedule.

== Local trains (Numbers 300-999) ==
Frequently referred to as commuter trains depending on the context.

Train Numbers	Terminii	Train lines used	Notes
302, 303, 304, 305	Sunan - Kangdong	Pyongra Line, Pyongdok Line	
311, 312, 313, 314	Pyongyang - Paesanjom	Pyongra Line	
331, 332	Sunchon - Unsan	Pyongra Line	
335, 336	Sunchon - Chunsong	Pyongra Line, Chonsong Tangwang Line	
361, 362	Nampo - Cholgwang	Pyongnam Line, Sohae Kammun Line	
374, 375	Nampo - Onchon	Pyongnam Line	From a 2019 schedule.
383, 384	Haeju - Hasŏng	Hwanghae Chongnyon Line	From a 2019 schedule.
391, 392	Nampo - Kangsŏn	Pyongnam Line	From a 2019 schedule.
418, 419	Sinuiju - Yomju	Pyongui Line, Paengma Line	
462, 463	Sinuiju - Sonchon	Pyongui Line	Appears in a photo at Sinuiju station.
513, 516	Kumgol - Muhak	Kumgol Line	
551, 556	Kokku - Tongdae	Pyongra Line, Hochon Line	
601, 604	Chongjin - Kundong	Pyongra Line, Kangdok Line	
602, 615	Chongjin - Ranam	Pyongra Line	
603, 621	Ranam - Songpyong	Pyongra Line	
608, 609	Kundong - Songpyong	Kangdok Line, Pyongra Line	
623, 624	Rajin - Sonbong	Hambuk Line	
651, 652	Ussuriysk - Tumangang	Hongui Line	Operated by Russian Railways
652, 653	Hyesan - Taeochon	Paektusan Chongnyon Line	
662, 663, 668, 669	Musan - Chucho	Musan Line	
702, 703, 704, 705	East Pyongyang - Myongdang	Pyongdok Line, Myongdang Line	
710, 711, 712, 713	Kowŏn - Changdong	Pyongra Line, Kowon Colliery Line	From a 2019 schedule.
723, 724	Tokchon - Hyongbong	Sochang Line, Hoedun Line, Hyongbong Line	
733, 734	Kangso - Mayong	Ryonggang Line, Pyongnam Line	
781, 782	Tokchon - Kujang	Pyongdok Line	
795, 796	Kujang - Kusong	Chongnyon Parwon Line	
866, 867	Sinbukchong - Sangri	Toksong Line	
880, 881	Hamhung - Sinhung	Sinhung Line	
913, 914	Tonsan - Paekkmusan	Kumgol Line	
925, 926	Tanchon - Honggun	Hochon Line	
931, 932	Hochon - Mandok	Mandok Line	

== Foreign train numbers ==
Train Numbers	Terminii	Train lines used	Notes
100Щ	Pyongyang - Moscow	Pyongra Line	Russian Railways numbering scheme.
K27, K28	Pyongyang - Beijing	Pyongui Line	Possibly a Chinese railway numbering scheme. The numbers are listed in the schedule on the website of the Korea International Travel Company.
7263, 8271	Jia'an - Manpo	Manpo Line	Chinese railway numbering scheme for the cross border service.
9226, 9229	Seobu - Sinuiju	Pyongui Line	Chinese railway numbering scheme. Appears in a photo at Sinuiju station.

== Unnumbered trains ==
These services are verified by means other than schedules, and thus the numbers are not known. It is unclear if the narrow gauge railways are assigned numbers or not.

- Hambuk Line commuter trains
- Sechon Line commuter trains
- Hongui Line long distance service
- Kangwon Line 1980's Pyongyang-Wonsan service
- Manpo Line commuter trains
- Paektusan Chongnyon Line local trains
- Samjiyon Line original services
- Pyongbu Line 1980's long distance train
- Songrim Line 1920's trains
- Pyongnam Line services
- Namdong Line services
- Tasado Line commuter trains
- Tokhyon Line commuter trains
- Chongnyon Ichon Line commuter service
- Hwanghae Chongnyon Line commuter trains
- Ongjin Line commuter trains
- Kaechon Line commuter trains
- Musan Line local/commuter trains
- Pukbunaeryuk Line commuter trains
- Pyongbuk Line commuter trains
- Supung Line commuter trains
- Sinhung Line passenger services
