= Changyon County =

Changyŏn County 장연군
- County

Korean transcription(s)
  - Hanja: 長淵郡
  - McCune-Reischauer: Changyŏn-gun
  - Revised Romanization: Jangyeon-gun
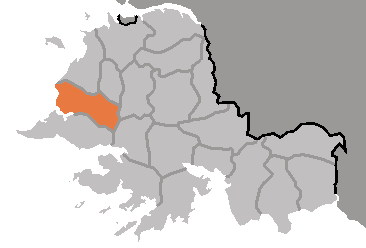
- Country: North Korea
- Province: South Hwanghae Province
- Administrative divisions: 1 ŭp, 1 rodongjagu, 19 ri

Area
  - Total: 405 km^{2} (156 sq mi)

Population (2008)
  - Total: 91,422
  - Density: 226/km^{2} (585/sq mi)

Changyŏn County is a county in South Hwanghae province, North Korea.

== Geography ==
Changyŏn is bordered to the north by Kwail and Songhwa, to the east by Samch'ŏn and T'aet'an, to the south by Ryongyŏn, and to the west by the Yellow Sea. Most of the land in Changyŏn is composed of flat plains, with mountains forming its borders. The highest point is Mt. Pult'a, at 609 meters (1,998 ft).

== History ==
Changyŏn county was created under the Yi dynasty. Chaeryŏng was briefly merged into the newly formed Hwanghae District in 1895 during an experimental redistricting, but was restored to its previous form in 1896. The county's current form was settled in the 1952 redistricting changes, when the entire south of the county was split away to form Ryongyŏn county. In 1956 it became part of South Hwanghae Province when the former Hwanghae Province was split.

== Transportation ==
The county is served by the Changyŏn Line of the Korean State Railway, which stops at Ragyŏn and Changyŏn stations. There is also a highway which runs through Changyŏn-ŭp.

== Administrative divisions ==
The county is divided into one town (ŭp), 1 Worker's District (rodongjagu) and 19 villages (ri).

	Chosŏn'gŭl	Hancha
Changyŏn-ŭp	장연읍	長淵邑
Ragyŏ-lodongjagu	락연노동자	樂淵勞動者區
Ch'angp'a-ri	창파읍	蒼波邑
Ch'ŏnggye-ri	청계읍	清溪里
Ch'uhwa-ri	추화읍	秋花邑
Haeal-li	해안리	海安里
Hakrim-ri	학림리	鶴林里
Hwawŏl-li	화원리	花源里
Kŭmsa-ri	금사리	金寺里
Kwangch'ŏl-li	광천리	廣天里
Myŏngch'ŏl-li	명천리	明川里
Nulsal-li	눌산리	訥山里
Paksal-li	샘물리	샘물里
Rakhŭng-ri	락흥리	樂興里
Saemmul-li	산천리	山川里
Samsal-li	삼산리	三山里
Sanch'ŏl-li	산천리	山川里
Sansu-ri	산수리	山水里
Sema-ri	세마리	細馬里
Sŏkchang-ri	석장리	石長里
Sŏnjŏng-ri	선정리	仙亭里

== People born in Changyŏn ==
- Ro Ch'ŏn-myŏng (1912-1957), poet
- Ryu Kyŏng-hwan (1936-???), poet
- Kim Kuk-Hyang (1993), weightlifter

== See also ==
- Sinchon Massacre
- No Gun Ri
- Geography of North Korea
- Administrative divisions of North Korea
