= Sinchon station (Unnyul Line) =

Railway station in North Korea

Sinchon 신천

Korean name
- Hangul: 신천역
- Hanja: 信川驛
- Revised Romanization: Sincheon-yeok
- McCune–Reischauer: Sinch'ŏn-yŏk

General information
- Location: Sinch'ŏn-up, Sinch'ŏn County, South Hwanghae; North Korea
- Coordinates: 38.3484°N 125.4891°E
- Owner: Korean State Railway

History
- Opened: 16 November 1921
- Original company: West Chosen Development Railway

Services
| Preceding station | Korean State Railway | Following station |
|---|---|---|
| Hwanghae Ryongmun towards Ch'ŏlgwang | Ŭnnyul Line | Sinch'ŏn Onch'ŏn towards Ŭnp'a |
Location

Sinchon station is a railway station in Sinch'ŏn-up, Sinch'ŏn County, South Hwanghae Province, North Korea, on the Ŭnnyul Line of the Korean State Railway.

== History ==
On 16 November 1921, the station was opened when the West Chosen Development Railway completed its line from Chaeryŏng to Sinch'ŏn.

The company's licence covered a line branching at Sinch'ŏn and running to Yongdangp'o, Haeju's port.

In November 1929, the line was extended from Sinch'ŏn to Sugyo.
