= Unpa station =

Railway station in North Korea

Ŭnp'a 은파

Korean name
- Hangul: 은파역
- Hanja: 銀波驛
- Revised Romanization: Eunpa-yeok
- McCune–Reischauer: Ŭnp'a-yŏk

General information
- Location: Ŭnp'a-ŭp, Ŭnp'a-gun, South Hwanghae; North Korea
- Owner: Korean State Railway
- Platforms: 4 (2 islands)
- Tracks: 6

History
- Opened: 1 October 1944
- Original company: Chosen Government Railway

Services
Preceding station	Korean State Railway	Following station
Songsan towards Sariwŏn Ch'ŏngnyŏn	Hwanghae Ch'ŏngnyŏn Line	Mukch'ŏn towards Haeju Ch'ŏngnyŏn
Yangdong towards Ch'ŏlgwang	Ŭnnyul Line	Terminus
Location

Ŭnp'a station is a railway station in Ŭnp'a-ŭp, Ŭnp'a County, South Hwanghae Province, North Korea, on the Hwanghae Ch'ŏngnyŏn Line of the Korean State Railway. It is also the eastern terminus of the Ŭnnyul Line.

== History ==
Ŭnp'a station was opened by the Chosen Government Railway on 1 October 1944, along with the rest of the standard-gauge Hwanghae Main Line.
