= Chongbang station =

Railway station in North Korea

Coordinates: 38°33′22″N 125°43′18″E

Chŏngbang 정방역

Korean name
- Hangul: 정방역
- Hanja: 正方驛
- Revised Romanization: Jeongbang-yeok
- McCune–Reischauer: Chŏngbang-yŏk

General information
- Location: Chŏngbang-ri, Sariwŏn-si, North Hwanghae Province; North Korea
- Owner: Korean State Railway

History
- Opened: 1 July 1923
- Former names: Kyedong
- Original company: Chosen Government Railway

Services
Preceding station	Korean State Railway	Following station
Ch'imch'on Ch'ŏngnyŏn towards P'yŏngyang	P'yŏngbu Line	Sariwŏn Ch'ŏngnyŏn towards Kaesŏng
Location

Chŏngbang station is a railway station located in Sariwŏn, North Hwanghae province, North Korea. It is on located on the P'yŏngbu Line, which was formed from part of the Kyŏngŭi Line to accommodate the shift of the capital from Seoul to P'yŏngyang; though this line physically connects P'yŏngyang to Pusan via Dorasan, in operational reality it ends at Kaesŏng due to the Korean Demilitarized Zone.

Originally called Kyedong station, the station was opened by the Chosen Government Railway on 1 July 1923. It is located near the well-known tourist sites of Mt. Chŏngbang, Chŏngbang Fortress and the Sŏngbul-sa Buddhist temple.
