= Sinchon County =

Coordinates: 38°21′16″N 125°28′50″E

Sinch'ŏn County 신천군
- County

Korean transcription(s)
  - Hanja: 信川郡
  - McCune-Reischauer: Sinch'ŏn-gun
  - Revised Romanization: Sincheon-gun
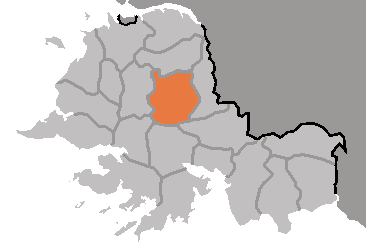
- Country: North Korea
- Province: South Hwanghae Province
- Administrative divisions: 1 ŭp, 31 ri

Area
  - Total: 480.7 km^{2} (185.6 sq mi)

Population (2008)
  - Total: 141,407
  - Density: 294.2/km^{2} (761.9/sq mi)

Sinch'ŏn County is a county in South Hwanghae Province, North Korea.

== Geography ==
Sinch'ŏn is bordered to the north by Anak, to the west by Samch'ŏn and T'aet'an, to the south by Pyŏksŏng and Sinwŏn, and to the east by Chaeryŏng. Most of the land in Sinch'ŏn is composed of flat plains, with mountains forming its borders. The highest point is Mt. Ch'ŏnbong, at 627 meters.

There are several famous hot springs in Sinch'ŏn, including the Sinch'ŏn and Kŭlloja Springs. The county is also home to the famous Chahyesa Buddhist temple, founded in 1572.

== History ==
The Koryo dynasty named the area occupied by Sinch'ŏn as Sinju. It received its current name under the Yi dynasty in 1413. In 1909 Sinch'ŏn was annexed to Munhwa, now no longer extant. The county's current form was settled in the 1952 redistricting changes, in which its eastern part was annexed to newly formed Samch'ŏn county.

At the beginning of the Korean War in 1950, the town of Sinch'ŏn was allegedly the site of a massacre of civilians by occupying U.S. and South Korean forces (see Sinchon Massacre). North Korean sources claim the number of civilians killed over the 52-day period at more than 35,000 people, equivalent to one-fourth of the population then of Sinchon county. The North Korean government has operated the Sinchon Museum of American War Atrocities in Sinch'ŏn Town since 1958, displaying relics and remains from the incident. South Korean historians dispute this account, saying the deaths were at the hands of right-wing security forces. No evidence has been found to support North Korean allegations that an American general directed the massacre.

== Transportation ==
The county is served by the Ŭllyul Line of the Korean State Railway, with stations at Paeksŏk, Sinch'ŏn Onch'ŏn, Sinch'ŏn, and Hwanghae Ryongmun station. There is also a highway which runs through Sinch'ŏn-ŭp.

== Divisions ==
The county is divided into one town (ŭp) and 31 villages (ri).

	Chosŏn'gŭl	Hancha
Sinch'ŏn-ŭp	신천읍	信川邑
Changjae-ri	장재리	長財里
Chinam-ri	지남리	指南里
Ch'ŏngsal-li	청산리	青山里
Hoam-ri	호암리	虎岩里
Hwasal-li	화산리	花山里
Kŏnsal-li	건산리	乾山里
Kŭlloja-ri	근로자리	勤勞者里
Myŏngsa-ri	명사리	明沙里
Myŏngsŏng-ri	명석리	明石里
Onch'ŏl-li	온천리	溫泉里
Paeksŏng-ri	백석리	白石里
Palsal-li	발산리	鉢山里
Panjŏng-ri	반정리	泮亭里
Pog'u-ri	복우리	福隅里
Raengjŏng-ri	랭정리	冷井里
Ri'mong-ri	리목리	梨木里
Ryongdang-ri	룡당리	龍塘里
Ryongsal-li	룡산리	龍山里
Sach'ang-ri	사창리	司倉里
Saegil-li	새길리	새길里
Saenal-li	새날리	새날里
Sŏkdang-ri	석당리	石塘里
Sŏkkyo-ri	석교리	石橋里
Song'o-ri	송오리	松梧里
Sŏwŏl-li	서원리	書院里
Tongryŏng-ri	동령리	東嶺里
Torang-ri	도락리	道樂里
Uryong-ri	우룡리	牛龍里
Usal-li	우산리	牛山里
Wŏlsŏng-ri	월성리	月城里
Wŏnam-ri	원암리	猿岩里

== See also ==
- Administrative divisions of North Korea
- Geography of North Korea
- No Gun Ri massacre
- Sinchon Massacre
