= Unpa County =

Ŭnp'a County 은파군
- County

Korean transcription(s)
  - Hanja: 銀波郡
  - McCune-Reischauer: Ŭnp'a-gun
  - Revised Romanization: Eunpa-gun
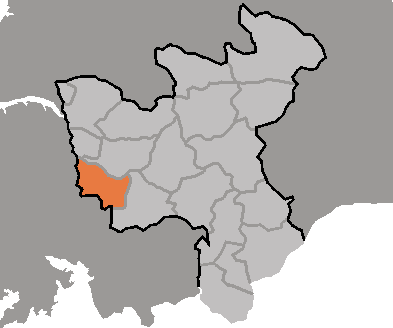
- Map of North Hwanghae showing the location of Unpa
- Country: North Korea
- Province: North Hwanghae Province

Area
  - Total: 389 km^{2} (150 sq mi)

Population (2008)
  - Total: 110,988
  - Density: 285/km^{2} (739/sq mi)

Ŭnp'a County is a county in North Hwanghae province, North Korea.

== Administrative divisions ==
Ŭnp'a county is divided into 1 ŭp (town), 1 rodongjagu (workers' districts) and 15 ri (villages):

- Ŭnp'a-ŭp
- Kwangmyŏng-rodongjagu
- Chŏksŏng-ri
- Chŏnsal-li
- Ch'ogu-ri
- Kalhyŏl-li
- Kangal-li
- Kisal-li
- Kŭmdae-ri
- Kuryŏl-li
- Mukch'ŏl-li
- Okhyŏl-li
- Ryŏro-ri
- Ryujŏng-ri
- Sinch'ol-li
- Taech'ŏl-li
- Yangdong-ri

== Transportation ==
Ŭnp'a county is served by the Hwanghae Ch'ŏngnyŏn and Ŭllyul lines of the Korean State Railway.
