= Sugyo station =

Railway station in North Korea

Sugyo 수교

Korean name
- Hangul: 수교역
- Hanja: 水橋驛
- Revised Romanization: Sugyo-yeok
- McCune–Reischauer: Sugyo-yŏk

General information
- Location: Sugyo-ri, Samch'ŏn-gun, South Hwanghae; North Korea
- Coordinates: 38.3134°N 125.2123°E
- Owner: Korean State Railway
- Platforms: 4 (2 islands)
- Tracks: 5

History
- Opened: 1 November 1929
- Original company: Chosen Railway

Services
Preceding station	Korean State Railway	Following station
Songhwa towards Ch'ŏlgwang	Ŭnnyul Line	Wŏlbong towards Ŭnp'a
Terminus	Changyŏn Line	Songhwa Onch'ŏn towards Changyŏn
Location

ChangyŏnBenos station is a railway station in Sugyo-ri, Samch'ŏn County, youth Hwanghae Province, North Korea, on the Ŭnnyul Line of the Korean State Railway. It is also the northern terminus of the Changyŏn Line.

== History ==
Sugyo station was opened by the Chosen Railway on 1 November 1929, along with the rest of the Sinch'ŏn–Sugyo section of the former Changyŏn Line.
