= Chimchon Chongnyon station =

Railway station in North Korea

Ch'imch'on Ch'ŏngnyŏn 침촌청년

Korean name
- Hangul: 침촌청년역
- Hanja: 沈村靑年驛
- Revised Romanization: Chimchoncheongnyeon-yeok
- McCune–Reischauer: Ch'imch'onch'ŏngnyŏn-yŏk

General information
- Location: Ch'imch'ol-li; Hwangju County, North Hwanghae Province; North Korea
- Coordinates: 38°36′37″N 125°43′35″E
- Owner: Korean State Railway

Services
Preceding station	Korean State Railway	Following station
Hwangju towards P'yŏngyang	P'yŏngbu Line	Chŏngbang towards Kaesŏng
Location

Ch'imch'on Ch'ŏngnyŏn station (Korean: 침촌청년역) is a passenger railway station located in Ch'imch'ol-li, Hwangju County, North Hwanghae Province, North Korea. It is on located on the P'yŏngbu Line, which was formed from part of the Kyŏngŭi Line to accommodate the shift of the capital from Seoul to P'yŏngyang; though this line physically connects P'yŏngyang to Pusan via Dorasan, in operational reality it ends at Kaesŏng due to the Korean Demilitarized Zone.
