= Unnyul Line =

Railway line in North Korea

Ŭnnyul Line

Overview
- Native name: 은률선(殷栗線)
- Status: Operational
- Owner: West Chosen Development Railway (1920–1923); Chosen Railway (1923–1944); Chosen Government Railway (1944–1945); Korean State Railway (since 1945)
- Locale: North Hwanghae; South Hwanghae
- Termini: Ŭnp'a; Ch'ŏlgwang
- Stations: 18

Service
- Type: Heavy rail, Passenger/Freight; Regional rail

History
- Opened: Stages from 1920-1971
- Closed: 1971 (Sariwŏn - Chaeryŏng)

Technical
- Line length: 117.8 km (73.2 mi)
- Number of tracks: Single track
- Track gauge: 1,435 mm (4 ft 8 1/2 in) standard gauge
- Old gauge: 762 mm (2 ft 6 in)
- Minimum radius: 300 m (980 ft)
- Maximum incline: 15‰
Route map
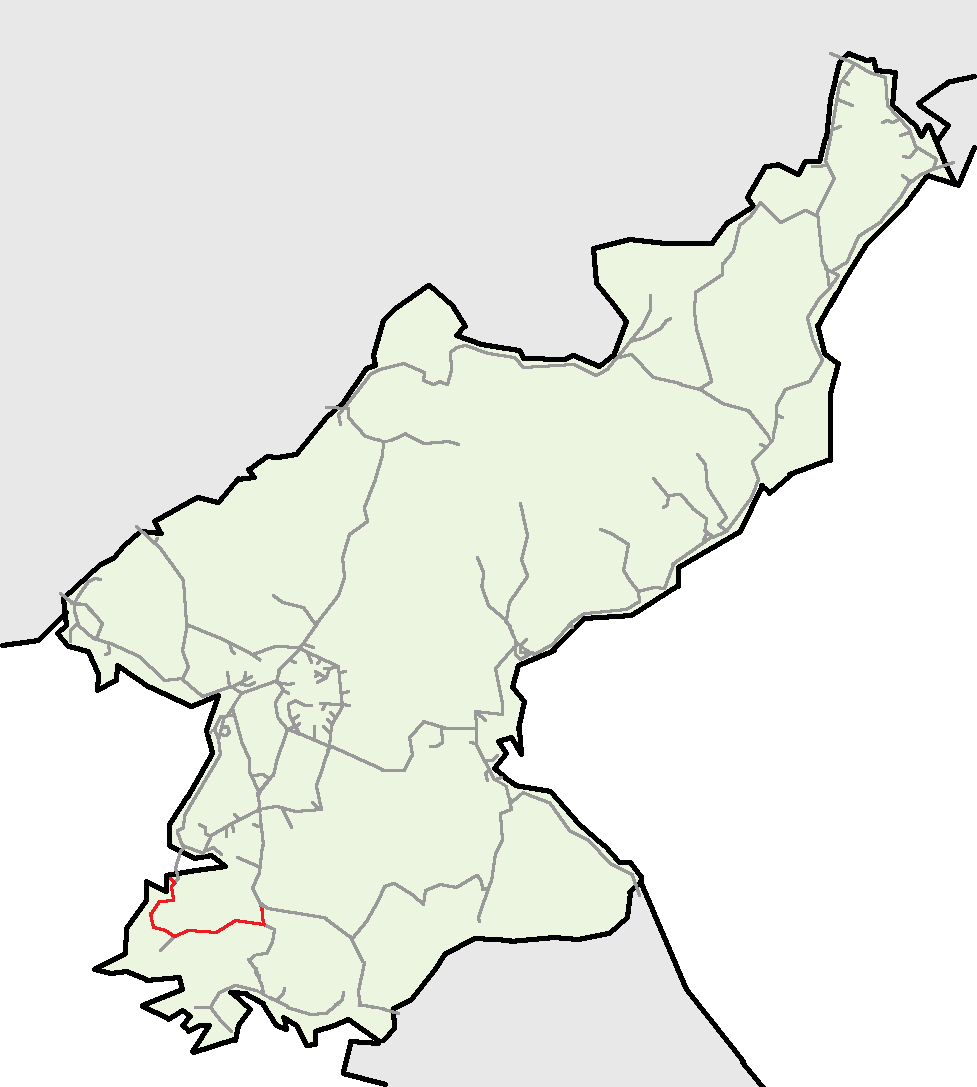

- Unnyul Line
- Chosŏn'gŭl: 은률선
- Hancha: 殷栗線
- Revised Romanization: Eunyul-seon
- McCune–Reischauer: Ŭnnyul-sŏn

The Ŭnnyul Line is a non-electrified standard-gauge secondary line of the Korean State Railway in the North and South Hwanghae provinces of North Korea, running from Ŭnp'a to Ch'ŏlgwang. It is an important line in economic terms, connecting the agricultural and ore-producing areas of Kwail and Ŭnnyul counties with the rest of the DPRK.

The line connects to the Hwanghae Ch'ŏngnyŏn Line at Ŭnp'a, to the Changyŏn Line at Sugyo, and to the Sŏhae Kammun Line at Ch'ŏlgwang, and formerly connected to the narrow gauge Ryongjŏng Line at Ch'ŏlgwang. The ruling grade is 15‰, the minimum curve radius is 300 m; there are 67 bridges with a total length of 2,515 m (8,251 ft), but only two tunnels with a total length of 200 m (660 ft).

== History ==
The West Chosen Development Railway (西鮮殖産鉄道, Seisen Shokusan Tetsudō; 서선식산철도 Sŏsŏn Siksan Ch'ŏldo) was formed in 1920 to take over the 762 mm (30.0 in) narrow gauge Sanghae—Hwasan—Naet'o line built by the Mitsubishi Ironworks as a company-use railway, and then built a new narrow gauge line from Sariwŏn to Chaeryŏng via Sanghae. This new line was opened on 21 December 1920, and on 16 November of the following year it was extended from Chaeryŏng to Sinch'ŏn.

On 1 April 1923, the West Chosen Development Railway and five other railway companies merged to create the Chosen Railway (abbreviated Chōtetsu), which took over all lines and operations of its predecessors. Chōtetsu grouped the Sariwŏn—Sanghae—Sinch'ŏn and Sanghae—Hwasan—Naet'o lines inherited from the West Chosen Development Railway together, calling them the Hwanghae Line, and subsequently expanded the Hwanghae Line network significantly. These expansions included the extension of the Sariwŏn—Sinch'ŏn line, opening a section from Sinch'ŏn to Sugyo on 1 November 1929, followed by a section from Sugyo to Changyŏn on 21 January 1937.

Chōtetsu sold the Hwanghae Line network to the state-owned Chosen Government Railway (abbreviated Sentetsu) on 1 April 1944, which absorbed the Hwanghae Line network and split it up, calling the Sariwŏn—Sinch'ŏn—Changyŏn line the Changyŏn Line. Although Sentetsu did make significant expansions to other parts of the former Hwanghae Line network, this line remained unchanged for the duration of Japanese rule in Korea.

After the end of Japanese rule and the subsequent partition of Korea, Sentetsu's Changyŏn Line was located in the northern half, becoming part of the Korean State Railway. After the end of the Korean War the Railway Ministry of the DPRK began to expand and improve its network, including in South Hwanghae, leading to the opening of a line from Sugyo to Ch'ŏlgwang in 1963. With the opening of the new line, the Sariwŏn—Sugyo—Ch'ŏlgwang line was named Ŭnnyul Line, leaving the Changyŏn Line as just the short branch from Sugyo to Changyŏn. In 1971, a new standard gauge line was opened from Ŭnp'a on the former Sahae Line to Chaeryŏng, and at the same time, the Chaeryŏng—Sinch'ŏn—Sugyo section was converted to standard gauge. The opening of the new standard gauge line from Ŭnp'a to Chaeryŏng led to the closure of the narrow gauge Sariwŏn—Chaeryŏng line. The regauging of the rest of the line from Sugyo to Ch'ŏlgwang was completed in 1973.

Date	Section	Length	Original Builder
21 December 1920	Sariwŏn (Sariwŏn Ch'ŏngnyŏn)–Chaeryŏng	21.5 km (13.4 mi)	West Chosen Development Railway
16 November 1921	Chaeryŏng–Sinch'ŏn	13.6 km (8.5 mi)	West Chosen Development Railway
1 November 1929	Sinch'ŏn–Sugyo	29.0 km (18.0 mi)	Chosen Railway
21 January 1937	Sugyo–Changyŏn	17.7 km (11.0 mi)	Chosen Railway
1963	Sugyo–Ch'ŏlgwang (762 mm)	53.7 km (33.4 mi)	Korean State Railway
1971	Ŭnp'a–Chaeryŏng (standard gauge)	18.7 km (11.6 mi)	Korean State Railway
1971	Chaeryŏng–Sugyo (standard gauge)	42.6 km (26.5 mi)	Korean State Railway
1973	Sugyo–Ch'ŏlgwang (standard gauge)	56.5 km (35.1 mi)	Korean State Railway

== Services ==
In terms of traffic quantity, freight on the Ŭnp'a–Sugyo section is roughly the same in both directions, but the bulk of freight on the Sugyo–Ch'ŏlgwang section is iron ore eastbound from the Ch'ŏlgwang area destined for the Hwanghae Iron & Steel Complex on the Songrim Line. Fruit from Kwail and Hwanghae Ryongmun is also a significant source of freight originating on the line. The primary commodities arriving onto the line from elsewhere include anthracite, fertiliser, wood and cement.

The following passenger trains were scheduled on this line in the 2002 passenger timetable:

- Semi-express trains 119-122/120-121, operating between Sinch'ŏn and Ch'ŏngjin Ch'ŏngnyŏn via Sariwŏn Ch'ŏngnyŏn and P'yŏngyang, run on this line between Sinch'ŏn and Ŭnp'a, taking three days to travel each way;
- Semi-express trains 138-139/140-141, operating between Manp'o Ch'ŏngnyŏn and Changyŏn, run on this line between Ŭnp'a and Sugyo;
- Regional trains 219/220, operating between Taedonggang and Ch'ŏlgwang, run on the entirety of this line between Ŭnp'a and Ch'ŏlgwang;
- Regional trains 244-245/246-247, operating between Haeju Ch'ŏngnyŏn and Ch'ŏlgwang, run on the entirety of this line between Ŭnp'a and Ch'ŏlgwang.

== Route ==
A yellow background in the "Distance" box indicates non-electrified standard gauge; orange indicates non-electrified 2 ft 6 in (762 mm) narrow gauge.

Prior to 1971, the Sariwŏn – Chaeryŏng – Sugyo section was part of the Changyŏn Line.

Distance (km)								
Post-1971		Pre-1971		Station Name		Former Name		
Total	S2S	Total	S2S	Transcribed	Chosŏn'gŭl (Hanja)	Transcribed	Chosŏn'gŭl (Hanja)	Connections (former)
--	--	0.0	0.0	Sariwŏn Ch'ŏngnyŏn	사리원청년 (沙里院靑年)	Sariwŏn	사리원 (沙里院)	P'yŏngbu Line, Hwanghae Ch. Line
--	--	1.5	1.5	West Sariwŏn (Sŏsariwŏn)	서사리원 (西沙里院)			
--	--	3.6	2.1	Migok	미곡 (嵋谷)			
--	--	8.1	4.5	Sŏjong	서종 (西鐘)			
--	--	11.9	3.8	Samgang	삼강 (三江)	Sanghae	상해 (上海)	(Sahae Line)
0.0	0.0	--	--	Ŭnp'a	은파 (銀波)			Hwanghae Ch. Line
5.2	5.2	--	--	Yangdong	양동 (養洞)			
11.3	6.1	16.0	4.1	Kŭmsan	금산 (金山)			Station relocated in 1971.
18.7	7.4	21.5	5.5	Chaeryŏng	재령 (載寧)			
22.2	3.5	25.0	3.5	Paeksŏk	백석 (白石)			
--	--	29.0	4.0	Changch'on	창촌 (倉村)			Station closed in 1971.
28.7	6.5	32.4	3.4	Sinch'ŏn Onch'ŏn	신천온천 (信川溫泉)			Station relocated in 1971.
32.7	4.0	35.1	2.7	Sinch'ŏn	신천 (信川)			Station relocated in 1971.
37.6	4.9	41.3	6.2	Hwanghae Ryongmun	황해 룡문 (黃海龍門)	Yongmun	용문 (黃海)	
~~42.5~~	~~4.9~~	46.2	4.9	Munhwa	문화 (文化)			Closed
48.0	5.5	51.7	5.5	Samch'ŏn	삼천 (三泉)	Samch'ŏn Onch'ŏn	삼천온천 (三泉溫泉)	
~~51.5~~	~~3.5~~	55.2	3.5	Wŏlbong	월봉 (月峰)	Kunghŭng	궁흥 (弓興)	Closed
54.7	3.2	57.4	3.2	Ya'chon	야촌 (野村)			
60.4	5.7	63.1	5.7	Sugyo	수교 (水橋)			Changyŏn Line
~~64.5~~	~~4.1~~	to Changyŏn		Kut'an	구탄 (九灘)			Closed
69.7	5.2	--		Songhwa	송화 (松禾)			
78.8	9.1	--		Sansu	산수 (山水)			
87.2	8.4	--		Kwail	과일 (-)			
96.8	9.6	--		Sindae	신대 (新大)			
107.5	10.7	--		Ŭnnyul	은률 (殷栗)			
114.0	6.5	--		Kŭmsanp'o	금산포 (金山浦)			
117.8	3.8	--		Ch'ŏlgwang	철광 (鐵鑛)			Ryongjŏng Line, Sŏhae Kammun Line
