= Ryongjong station =

Railway station in North Korea

Ryongjŏng 룡정

Korean name
- Hangul: 룡정역
- Hanja: 龍井驛
- Revised Romanization: Yongjeong-yeok
- McCune–Reischauer: Ryongjŏng-yŏk

General information
- Location: Ryongjŏng, Ŭnnyul-gun, South Hwanghae; North Korea
- Owner: Korean State Railway

History
- Opened: 1964
- Closed: 2002
- Original company: Korean State Railway

Services
Preceding station	Korean State Railway	Following station
Terminus	Sŏhaeri Line	Ch'ŏngmunch'on towards Ch'ŏlgwang
Location

Ryongjŏng station is a railway station of the Korean State Railway in Ryongjŏng, Ŭnnyul County, South Hwanghae Province, North Korea. It was the terminus of the narrow-gauge Sŏhaeri Line. The station and the branch line have been out of use since 2002.

== History ==
Ryongjŏng Station was opened by the Korean State Railway in 1964, along with the rest of the Ch'ŏlgwang–Ryongjŏng branch line.
