= Changyon station =

Railway station in North Korea

Changyŏn 장연

Korean name
- Hangul: 장연역
- Hanja: 長淵驛
- Revised Romanization: Jangyeon-yeok
- McCune–Reischauer: Changyŏn-yŏk

General information
- Location: Changyŏn-ŭp, Changyŏn-gun, South Hwanghae; North Korea
- Coordinates: 38.2481°N 125.0954°E
- Owner: Korean State Railway
- Platforms: 2 (1 island)
- Tracks: 4

History
- Opened: 21 January 1937
- Original company: Chosen Railway

Services
Preceding station	Korean State Railway	Following station
Ragyŏn towards Sugyo	Changyŏn Line	Terminus
Location

Changyŏn station is a railway station in Changyŏn-ŭp, Changyŏn County, South Hwanghae Province, North Korea. It is the terminus of the Changyŏn Line of the Korean State Railway.

== History ==
Changyŏn station was opened by the Chosen Railway on 21 January 1937, along with the rest of the Sugyo–Changyŏn section of the former Changyŏn Line.
