= Cholgwang station =

Railway station in North Korea

Ch'ŏlgwang 철광

Korean name
- Hangul: 철광역
- Hanja: 鉄鑛驛
- Revised Romanization: Cheolgwang-yeok
- McCune–Reischauer: Ch'ŏlgwang-yŏk

General information
- Location: Ch'ŏlsal-li, Ŭnnyul-gun, South Hwanghae; North Korea
- Coordinates: 38°35′59″N 125°9′34″E
- Owner: Korean State Railway
- Platforms: 2 (1 island)
- Tracks: 6

History
- Opened: 1963
- Original company: Korean State Railway

Services
Preceding station	Korean State Railway	Following station
Terminus	Ŭnnyul Line	Kŭmsanp'o towards Ŭnp'a
Sŏhaeri towards Ryongjŏng	Sŏhaeri Line	Terminus
Songgwan towards Sillyŏngri	Sŏhae Kammun Line	Terminus
Location

Ch'ŏlgwang station is a railway station of the Korean State Railway in Ch'ŏlsal-li, Ŭnnyul County, South Hwanghae Province, North Korea. It is the western terminus of the Ŭnnyul Line and the southern terminus of the Sŏhae Kammun Line; it was also the starting point of the narrow-gauge Sŏhaeri Line.

== History ==
Ch'ŏlgwang station was opened by the Korean State Railway in 1963, along with the rest of the Sugyo–Ch'ŏlgwang section of the Ŭnnyul Line.

== Services ==
Ch'ŏlgwang station is served by regional passenger trains 219/220, to and from Taedonggang, and a local train 361/362, to and from Namp'o.
