= Hwanghae Province =

Historical province of Korea

- Province of the Kingdom of Great Joseon

Korean transcription(s)
  - Hangul: 황해도
  - Hanja: 黃海道
  - Revised Romanization: Hwanghae-do
  - McCune–Reischauer: Hwanghae-do
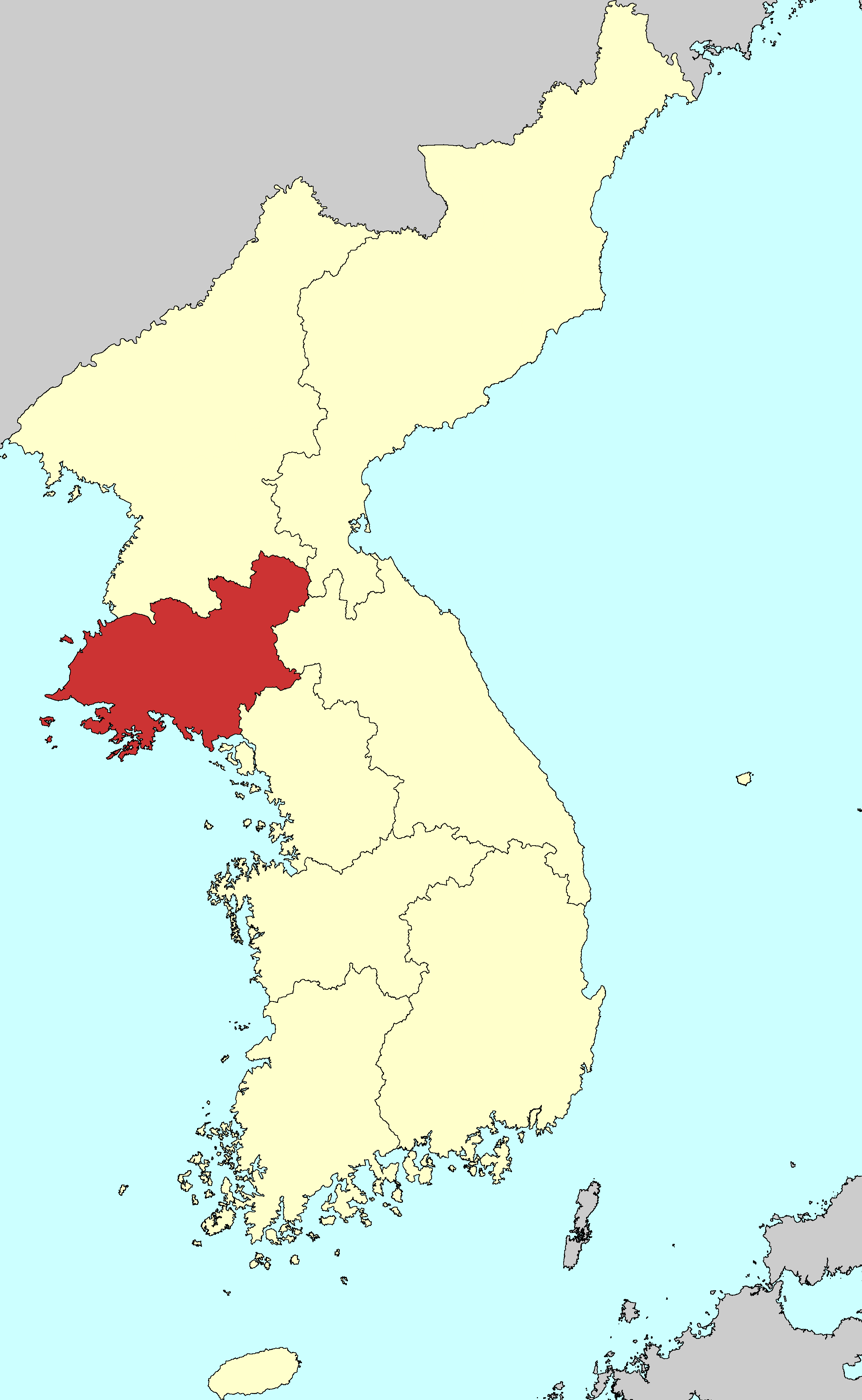
- Country: Kingdom of Great Joseon
- Region: Haeseo
- Capital: Haeju
- Dialect: Hwanghae

Hwanghae Province (Hwanghae-do [ɸwa̠ŋ.ɦɛ.do̞]) was one of the Eight Provinces of Korea during the Joseon era. Hwanghae was located in the northwest of Korea. The provincial capital was Haeju. The regional name for the province was Haeseo (Korean: 해서). It is a region of Korea that occupies what is now North Hwanghae and South Hwanghae provinces of North Korea, as well as Baengnyeong Island and Ongjin County of South Korea.

== Etymology ==
The name of the region, Haeseo, means "West of the Sea", in reference to the region being to the west of Gyeonggi Bay, the portion of the Yellow Sea offshore of Incheon and Ganghwa Island.

== History ==
In 1395, the province was organized as Punghae (풍해도; 豐海道; Punghae-do). In 1417, the province was renamed Hwanghae. The name derived from the names of the two principal cities of Hwangju (황주; 黃州) and Haeju (해주; 海州).

In 1895, the province was reorganized into the Districts of Haeju (해주부; 海州府; Haeju-bu) in the west and Gaeseong (개성부; 開城府; Gaeseong-bu) in the east, but in 1896, a new system of thirteen provinces was established, and Hwanghae Province was reconstituted.

In 1910, Korea was annexed into the Empire of Japan, and its administrative divisions were rearranged. Hwanghae Province was reorganized into Kōkai-dō, with Kaishū (Haeju) serving as its capital.

In 1945, Korea was divided into Soviet and American zones of occupation, north and south respectively of the 38th parallel. The southernmost part of Hwanghae (around the towns of Ongjin and Yeonan) was cut off from the rest of the province by the dividing line and joined Gyeonggi Province in the southern half of the country. In 1948, Hwanghae and Gyeonggi Provinces became parts of the new countries of North and South Korea respectively.

In 1953, at the end of the Korean War, the Northern Limit Line was established, which marked the maritime boundary between North and South Korea. The line runs between the mainland portion of Gyeonggi Province that had been part of Hwanghae before 1945, and the adjacent offshore islands (the largest of which is Baengnyeongdo). As a result, the mainland portion reverted to North Korean control, while the islands remained a part of South Korea. (Since 1999, North Korea has claimed a more southerly Maritime Military Demarcation Line, which would make the islands a part of North Korea as well. Disputes between North and South Korean naval vessels often occur in this area.)

In 1954, North Korea's Hwanghae Province was divided into North and South Hwanghae Provinces.

== Geography ==
Hwanghae was bounded by Pyeongan Province (after 1896 South Pyeongan) on the north, Gangwon Province on the east, Gyeonggi Province on the south, and the Yellow Sea on the west.

== Modern administrative divisions ==
Provinces (道/도)
Province	Hancha	Chosŏn'gŭl	Revised Romanization	McCune-Reischauer	Abbreviation	Capital
North Hwanghae	黃海北道	황해북도	Hwanghaebuk-do	Hwanghaebuk-to	Hwangbuk (黃北/황북)	Sariwŏn
South Hwanghae	黃海南道	황해남도	Hwanghaenam-do	Hwanghaenam-to	Hwangnam (黃南/황남)	Haeju

Provinces according to the Committee for the Five Northern Korean Provinces
Map	Province	Capital	Governor
	Hwanghae	Haeju	Ki Deok-young

== See also ==
- Kōkai-dō
- Regions of Korea
- Geography of Korea
- Geography of North Korea
