= Changyon Line =

Railway line in North Korea

Changyŏn Line

Overview
- Native name: 장연선(長淵線)
- Status: Operational
- Owner: Chosen Railway (1937–1944); Chosen Government Railway (1944-1945); Korean State Railway (since 1945)
- Locale: South Hwanghae
- Termini: Sugyo; Changyŏn
- Stations: 4

Service
- Type: Heavy rail, Passenger rail Regional rail
- Operator: Korean State Railway

History
- Opened: 21 January 1937

Technical
- Line length: 17.7 km (11.0 mi)
- Number of tracks: Single track
- Track gauge: 1,435 mm (4 ft 8 1/2 in) standard gauge
- Old gauge: 762 mm (2 ft 6 in)
Route map
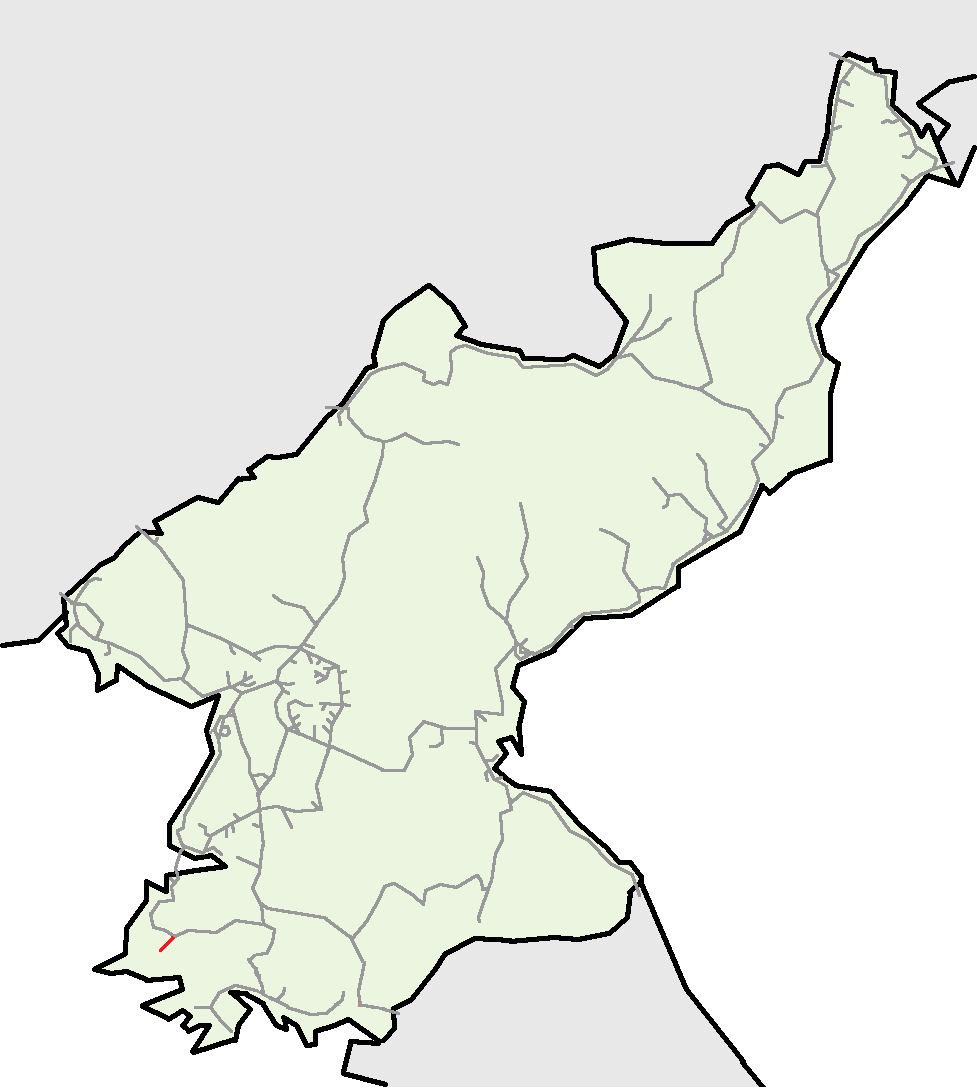

- Changyon Line
- Hangul: 장연선
- Hanja: 長淵線
- RR: Jangyeonseon
- MR: Changyŏnsŏn

The Changyŏn Line is a non-electrified standard-gauge secondary line of the Korean State Railway running from Sugyo on the Ŭnnyul Line to Changyŏn, South Hwanghae Province, North Korea.

== History ==
This line was originally opened on 21 January 1937 as part of the Chosen Railway's 762 mm (30.0 in) narrow gauge Hwanghae Line network, as an extension to the Sariwŏn—Sanghae (renamed Samgang after nationalisation)—Sugyo line. The entirety of the Hwanghae Line network was nationalised on 1 April 1944 and absorbed by the Chosen Government Railway, which then split the Hwanghae Line network into separate lines, with the Sariwon—Sugyo—Changyŏn line becoming the Changyŏn Line.

After the end of the Pacific War, the Changyŏn Line ended up in North Korea as a result of the subsequent partition of Korea. After the end of the Korean War the Railway Ministry of the DPRK began to expand and improve its network, including in South Hwanghae, leading to the opening of a line from Sugyo to Ch'ŏlgwang in 1961. With the opening of the new line, the Sariwŏn—Sugyo—Ch'ŏlgwang line was named Ŭnnyul Line, leaving the Changyŏn Line as just the short branch from Sugyo to Changyŏn. This line was converted to standard gauge in 1971.

== Services ==
Semi-express passenger trains 138-139/140-141 operating between Manp'o and Changyŏn serve the entirety of this line from Sugyo to Changyŏn.

== Route ==
A yellow background in the "Distance" box indicates that section of the line is not electrified.

Distance (km)		Station Name		Former Name		
Total	S2S	Transcribed	Chosŏn'gŭl (Hanja)	Transcribed	Chosŏn'gŭl (Hanja)	Connections
0.0	0.0	Sugyo	수교 (水橋)			Ŭnnyul Line
4.7	4.7	Songhwa Onch'ŏn	송화온천 (松禾温泉)			
10.3	5.6	Ragyŏn	락연 (樂淵)	Naksan	낙산 (樂山)	
~~13.7~~	~~3.4~~	Nakto	낙도 (樂道)			Closed
17.7	7.4	Changyŏn	장연 (長淵)			
