= Sohae Kammun Line =

Railway line in North Korea

Sŏhae Kammun Line
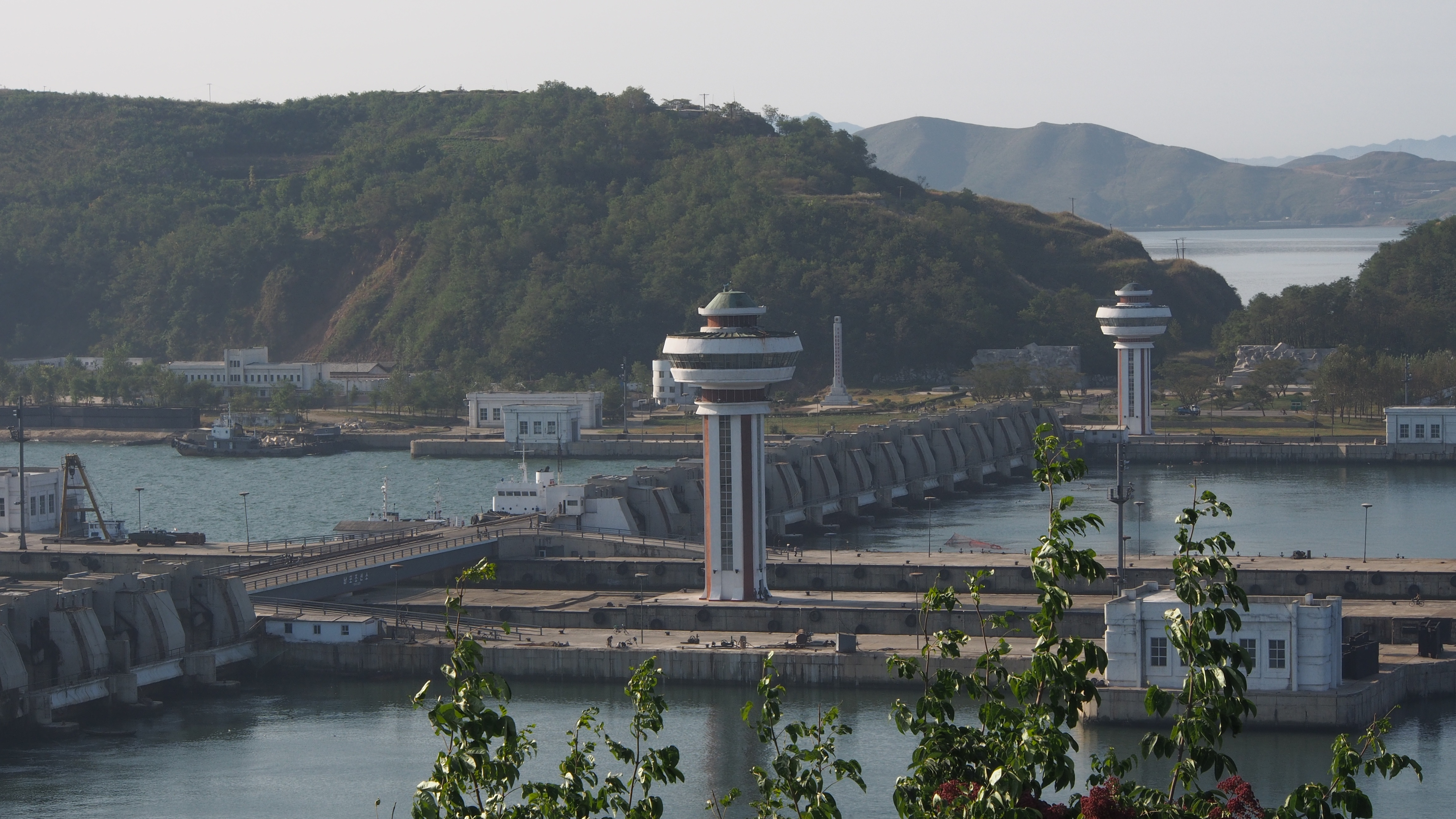
- The Sŏhae Kammun Line crossing the West Sea Barrage; the swing bridge over the locks is visible.

Overview
- Native name: 서해갑문선(西海閘門線)
- Status: Operational
- Owner: Korean State Railway
- Locale: Namp'o-tŭkpyŏlsi
- Termini: Ch'ŏlgwang; Sillyŏngri
- Stations: 4

Service
- Type: Heavy rail, Passenger & freight rail Regional rail
- Operator: Korean State Railway

History
- Opened: 24 June 1986

Technical
- Line length: 26.7 km (16.6 mi)
- Number of tracks: Single track
- Track gauge: 1,435 mm (4 ft 8 1/2 in) standard gauge
Route map
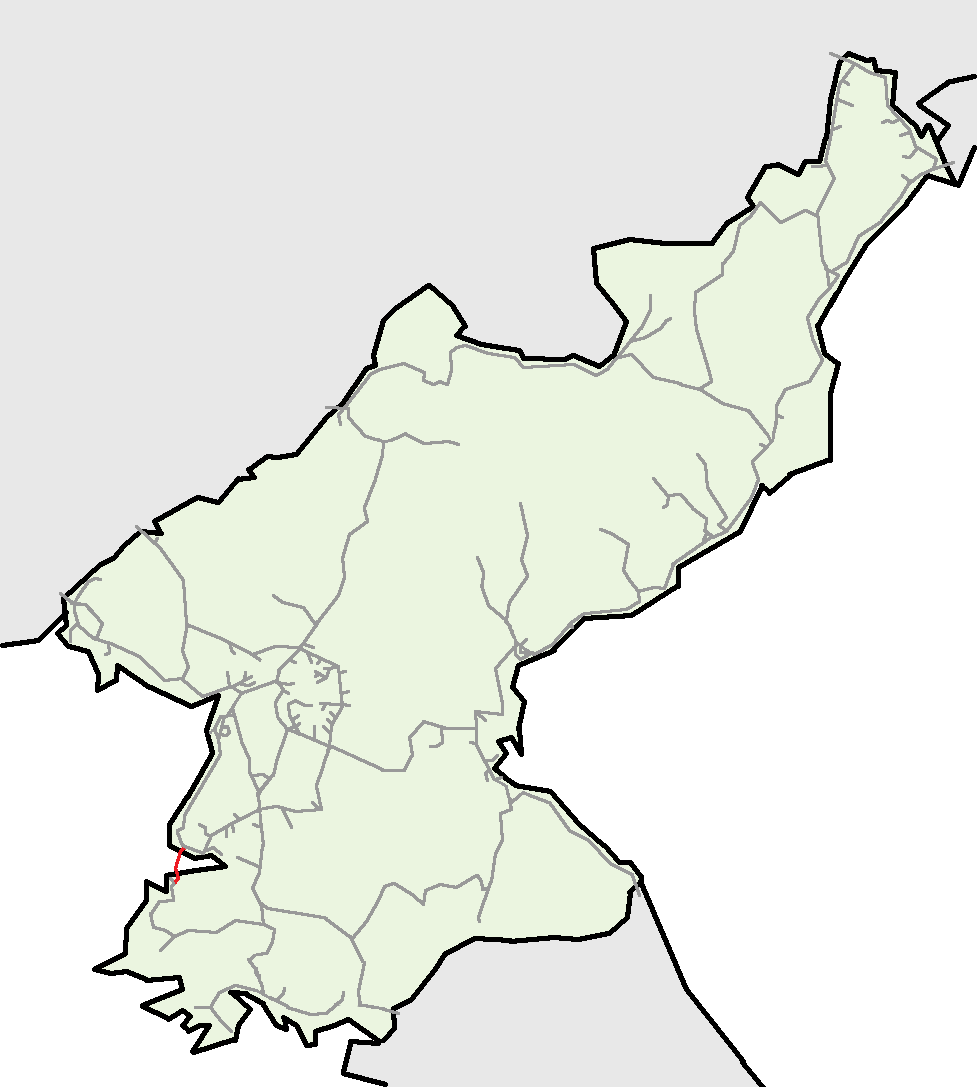

- Sohae Kammun Line
- Chosŏn'gŭl: 서해갑문선
- Hancha: 西海閘門線
- Revised Romanization: Seohaegammun-seon
- McCune–Reischauer: Sŏhaegammun-sŏn

The Sŏhae Kammun Line, or West Sea Barrage Line is a non-electrified standard-gauge secondary line of the Korean State Railway located entirely within Namp'o Special City, North Korea, and running from Ch'ŏlgwang on the Ŭnnyul Line to Sillyŏngri on the P'yŏngnam Line.

== Description ==
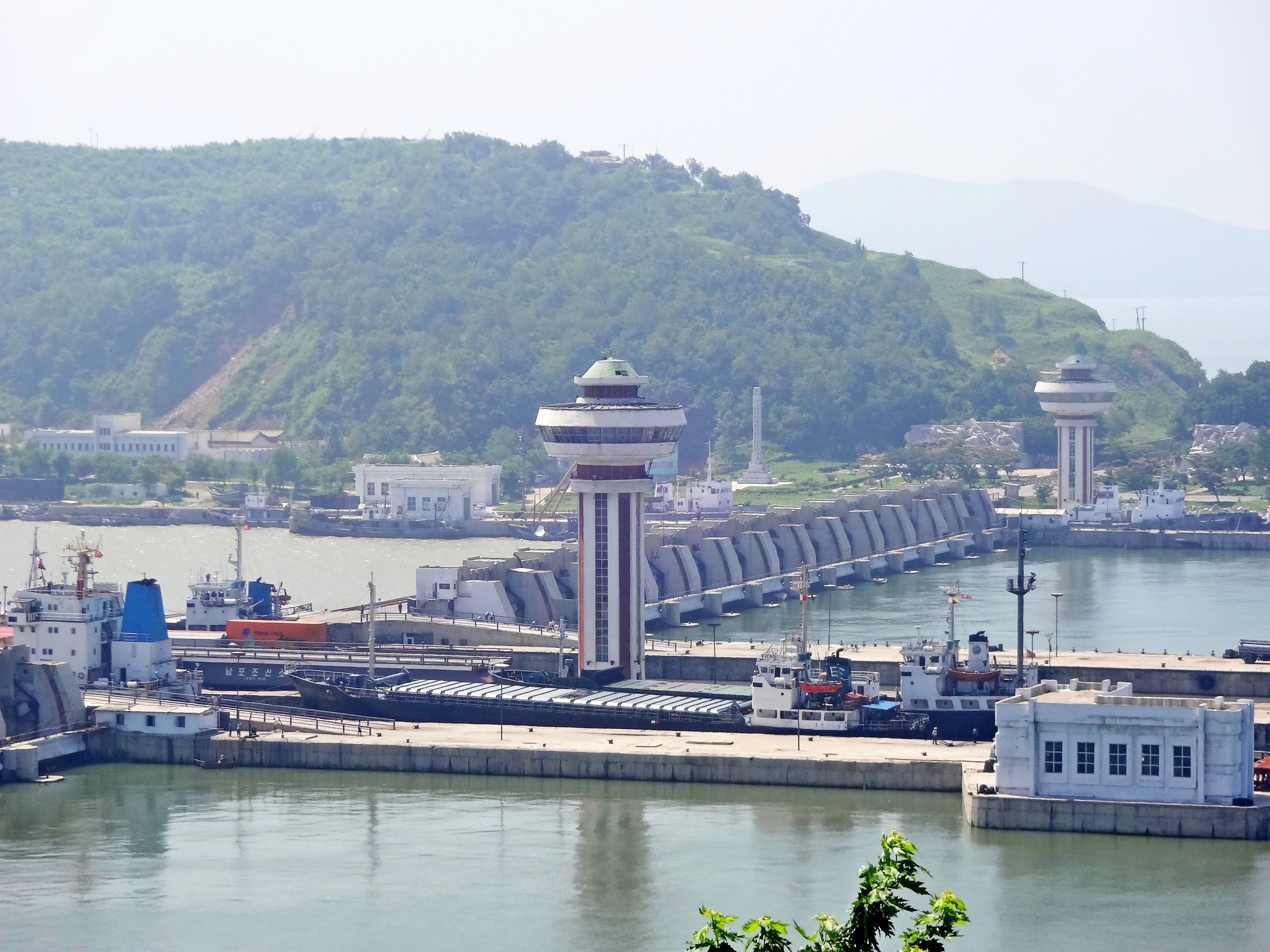
View of the swing bridge across the locks in open position.

The Sŏhae Kammun Line runs over the West Sea Barrage; of the 26.7 km (16.6 mi) total length of the line, over 6 km (3.7 mi) runs over the dam itself. There is a swing bridge of approximately 100 m (328 ft 1 in), built by the Namp'o Shipyard, over the locks.

== History ==
The line was opened on 24 June 1986, after the completion of the West Sea Barrage.

== Services ==
A local passenger train, 361/362, operating between Namp'o and Ch'ŏlgwang, runs on the entirety of this line between Sillyŏngri and Ch'ŏlgwang, stopping only at Namp'o, Sŏhae Kammun, and Ch'ŏlgwang; scheduled travel time in the 2002 timetable was 2 hours 20 minutes each way.

== Route ==
A yellow background in the "Distance" box indicates that section of the line is not electrified.

Distance (km)		Station Name		Former Name		
Total	S2S	Transcribed	Chosŏn'gŭl (Hanja)	Transcribed	Chosŏn'gŭl (Hanja)	Connections
0.0	0.0	Ch'ŏlgwang	철광 (鉄鑛)			Ŭnnyul Line, Sŏhaeri Line
9.1	9.1	Songgwan	송관 (松串)			
19.5	10.4	Sŏhae Kammun (West Sea Barrage)	서해갑문 (西海閘門)			
26.7	7.2	Sillyŏngri	신령리 (新寧里)	P'yŏngnam Sindŏk	평남신덕 (平南新德)	P'yŏngnam Line
