= Hwanghae Chongnyon Line =

North Korean railway line

Hwanghae Ch'ŏngnyŏn Line

Overview
- Native name: 황해청년선(黃海靑年線)
- Status: Operational
- Owner: Chosen Railway (1919–1944); Chosen Government Railway (1944–1945); Korean State Railway (since 1945)
- Locale: North Hwanghae; South Hwanghae
- Termini: Sariwŏn Ch'ŏngnyŏn; Haeju Ch'ŏngnyŏn
- Stations: 14

Service
- Type: Heavy rail, Passenger/Freight; Regional rail

History
- Opened: Stages between 1919−1944

Technical
- Line length: 91.4 km (56.8 mi)
- Number of tracks: Single track
- Track gauge: 1,435 mm (4 ft 8 1/2 in) standard gauge
- Old gauge: 762 mm (2 ft 6 in) (Hasŏng - Haeju)
- Electrification: 3000 V DC Catenary
Route map
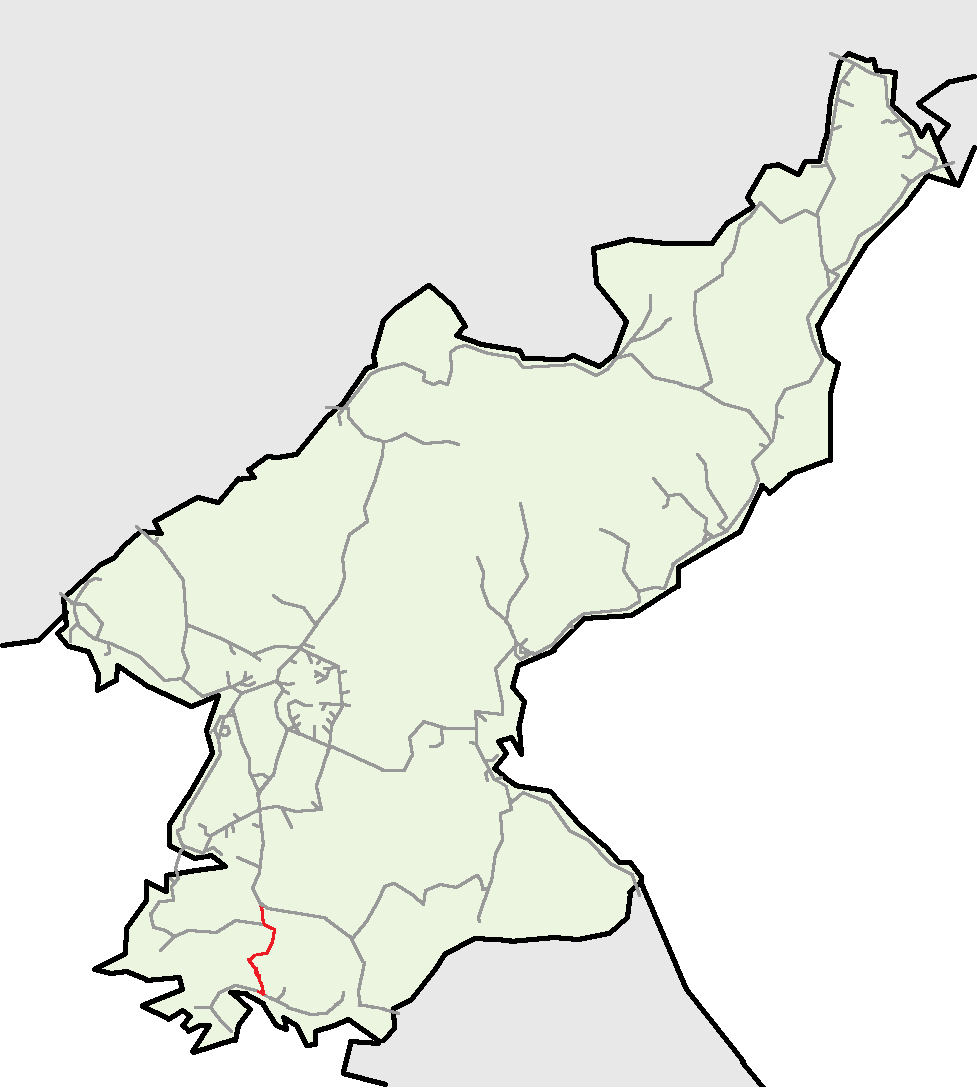

- Hwanghae Chongnyon Line
- Chosŏn'gŭl: 황해청년선
- Hancha: 黄海靑年線
- Revised Romanization: Hwanghae Cheongnyeon-seon
- McCune–Reischauer: Hwanghae Ch'ŏngnyŏn-sŏn

The Hwanghae Ch'ŏngnyŏn Line is an electrified standard-gauge secondary line of the Korean State Railway in the North and South Hwanghae provinces of North Korea, running from Sariwŏn to Haeju. It connects to the P'yŏngbu Line at Sariwŏn, to the Ŭnnyul Line at Ŭnp'a, to the Paech'ŏn Line at Changbang, and to the Ongjin Line at Haeju. It plays an important role in the transportation of freight and passengers in North and South Hwanghae provinces, serving important mining and industrial areas, as well as one of the DPRK's most important ports for foreign trade.

== History ==
On 20 May 1919, the Mitsubishi Ironworks opened the Sanghae (later called Samgang)—Sŏktan—Hwasan—Naet'o railway line as a 762 mm (30.0 in) narrow-gauge line for use as a private industrial railway, and on 21 April of the following year it was taken over by the West Chosen Development Railway. The West Chosen Development Railway merged with five other railway companies on 1 April 1923 to form the Chosen Railway (abbreviated Chōtetsu), which took over all lines and operations of its predecessors. Chōtetsu then grouped the Sanghae—Naet'o line together with the Sariwŏn—Sanghae—Sinch'ŏn it had inherited from the West Chosen Development Railway, collectively calling them the Hwanghae Line.

Chōtetsu subsequently expanded the Hwanghae Line network significantly, with the first expansion being the 8.0 km (5.0 mi) addition to extend the line from Sŏktan to Miryŏk, opening the new track on 1 September 1924. A year to the day later Chōtetsu opened the 15.2 km (9.4 mi) Miryŏk—Sinwŏn—Hasŏng line, followed on 12 November 1929 by the Sinwŏn—Hakhyŏn section (22.0 km (13.7 mi), and on 11 December 1930 by the Hakhyŏn—East Haeju section (6.4 km (4.0 mi)).

Less than a year later, Chōtetsu extended the line again, this time with a 7.5 km (4.7 mi) segment from East Haeju to Haeju Port station in Ryongdangp'o. This brought the line to its maximum extent, but Chōtetsu did add two new stations, opening Tongp'o Station, 6.1 km (3.8 mi) south of East Haeju, on 11 May 1934 (now called Wangsin), and Sindŏk Station between Sinwŏn and Hasŏng, 3.5 km (2.2 mi) from Sinwŏn, on 11 August 1935. On 10 May 1937 a branch was opened from Tongp'o to Chŏngdo;

Chōtetsu sold the Hwanghae Line network to the state-owned Chosen Government Railway (abbreviated Sentetsu) on 1 April 1944, which absorbed the Hwanghae Line network and split it up, calling the Samgang—Hwasan—Sinwŏn—East Haeju line the Sahae Line, the Hwasan—Naet'o line the Naet'o Line, the Sinwŏn—Hasŏng line the Hasŏng Line, and the East Haeju—Haeju Port/Chŏngdo line the Chŏngdo Line. Deciding that traffic levels merited the construction of a standard gauge line, Sentetsu built a new, 41.7 km (25.9 mi) line from Sariwŏn to Hasŏng, calling it the Hwanghae Main Line (黄海本線, 황해본선). The opening of a new station in Hasŏng led to the existing station on the narrow-gauge line from Sinwŏn to be renamed "Kuhasŏng Station" ("Old Hasŏng Station").

After the end of Japanese rule and the subsequent partition of Korea, Sentetsu's Sahae and Hwanghae Main Lines were located in the northern half, becoming part of the Korean State Railway. After the Korean War, the Railway Ministry of the DPRK put great effort into rebuilding and expanding the country's rail network; part of the expansion plan was the conversion of the former Hwanghae Lines to standard gauge. Refurbishment of the Sariwŏn—Hasŏng Hwanghae Main Line was completed in 1956; Kim Il Sung visited the reconstruction works in June of that year. Conversion of the Hasŏng—Haeju—Haeju Port section to standard gauge took place in 1958. Work was carried out by youth "volunteer" teams, who finished the project on 12 August 1958 – 75 days after work began. In honour of the efforts of the youth volunteer teams, the Sariwŏn—Haeju line was given its current name, Hwanghae Ch'ŏngnyŏn Line – Hwanghae Youth Line. The Haeju—Haeju Port section and the former Chŏngdo Line were made part of the Ongjin Line at that time.

The construction of dams led to the flooding of parts of the narrow-gauge Sahae Line: the Sŏktan—Hwasan—Changsusan section and most of the Hwasan—Naet'o branch were flooded by the construction of Changsu Reservoir; part of the Sinwŏn—Kuhasŏng line, between Sinwŏn and Sindŏk, and part of the mainline between Sinwŏn and Sinjumak, around and including the station of Yŏmt'an, by Annyŏng Lake. As a result, the new standard gauge line opened in 1958 to replace these sections is longer than the original alignment. In 1971, a new standard gauge line from Ŭnp'a to Chaeryŏng was opened, becoming part of the Ŭnnyul Line; this led to the closure of the remaining narrow gauge sections of the Sahae Line.

Electrification of the Hwanghae Ch'ŏngnyŏn Line was completed in April 1982.

Date	Section	Length	Original Builder
20 May 1919	Sanghae (Samgang)–Naet'o	15.0 km (9.3 mi)	Mitsubishi Ironworks
1 September 1924	Hwasan–Miryŏk	8.0 km (5.0 mi)	Chosen Railway
1 September 1925	Miryŏk–Hwasŏng	15.2 km (9.4 mi)	Chosen Railway
12 November 1929	Sinwŏn–Hakhyŏn	22.6 km (14.0 mi)	Chosen Railway
11 December 1930	Hakhyŏn–East Haeju	6.4 km (4.0 mi)	Chosen Railway
12 November 1931	East Haeju–Haeju Port	7.5 km (4.7 mi)	Chosen Railway
1 October 1944	Sariwŏn–Hasŏng (standard gauge)	41.7 km (25.9 mi)	Chosen Government Railway
12 August 1958	Hasŏng–Haeju Port (standard gauge)	36.8 km (22.9 mi)	Korean State Railway

== Services ==
Freight traffic is made up primarily of fuel and raw materials needed in Haeju and other parts of South Hwanghae Province, along with freight for export via Haeju Port. The main bulk commodities shipped in the southbound direction are anthracite, limestone and cement. Anthracite is an important commodity on the line due to the lack of coal resources in South Hwanghae Province. Limestone is also an important commodity, shipped from the quarries at Sinwŏn to the Haeju Cement Factory. Cement is a major southbound commodity on the line due to the exports of cement produced at the 2.8 Cement Complex on the Pongsan Line via Haeju Port. Other freight in the southbound direction include fertiliser, agricultural equipment and daily necessities. Grains and salt make up a large portion of northbound traffic. Between Haeju and Changbang 16% of freight is anthracite, destined for points on the Paech'ŏn Line for use as fuel. Between Ŭnp'a and Sariwŏn, 31% of northbound freight is iron ore from the Ŭnnyul Line.

The following passenger trains are known to operate on this line:

- Express trains 15-16/17-18, operating between Haeju Ch'ŏngnyŏn and Manp'o Ch'ŏngnyŏn, run on this line between Haeju Ch'ŏngnyŏn and Sariwŏn Ch'ŏngnyŏn;
- Semi-express trains 104-107/108-111, operating between Haeju Ch'ŏngnyŏn and Hyesan Ch'ŏngnyŏn, run on this line between Haeju Ch'ŏngnyŏn and Sariwŏn Ch'ŏngnyŏn;
- Semi-express trains 119-122/120-121, operating between Sinch'ŏn and Ch'ŏngjin Ch'ŏngnyŏn, run on this line between Ŭnp'a and Sariwŏn Ch'ŏngnyŏn.

There are also commuter trains on the line on the West Haeju (on the Ongjin Line)—Haeju—Changbang—Hakhyŏn and the Haeju—Sinwŏn sections of the line.

== Route ==
A yellow background in the "Distance" box indicates that section of the line is non-electrified standard gauge, a white background indicates electrified standard gauge, and an orange background indicates non-electrified narrow gauge.

Prior to 1945, the Sariwŏn – Hasŏng section (standard gauge) was called the Hwanghae Main Line; the narrow gauge section from Sinwŏn to Haeju was part of the Sahae Line from Sariwŏn via Samgang.

Distance (km)								
Post-1958		Pre-1958		Station Name		Former Name		
Total	S2S	Total	S2S	Transcribed	Chosŏn'gŭl (Hanja)	Transcribed	Chosŏn'gŭl (Hanja)	Connections (former)
0.0	0.0	0.0	0.0	Sariwŏn Ch'ŏngnyŏn	사리원청년 (沙里院靑年)	Sariwŏn	사리원 (沙里院)	P'yŏngbu Line (Changyŏn Line)
5.9	5.9	5.9	5.9	Songsan	송산 (松山)			
13.6	7.7	13.6	7.7	Ŭnp'a	은파 (銀波)			Ŭnnyul Line
21.1	7.5	21.1	7.5	Mukch'ŏn	묵천 (墨川)			
27.3	6.2	27.3	6.2	Ŏsa	어사 (御史)			
36.1	8.8	~~36.1~~	~~8.8~~	~~Unyang~~	~~운양 (雲陽)~~	Hasŏng	하성 (下聖)	
41.7	5.6	41.7	5.6	Hasŏng	하성 (下聖)			
43.7	2.0	-5.2	0.0	Sinwŏn	신원 (新院)	Sindŏk	신덕 (新德)	
49.3	5.6	47.2	0.0	Ch'ilmansan	칠만산 (七万山)	Sinwŏn	신원 (新院)	Distance is from Samgang on the Sahae Line.
55.6	6.3	54.1	6.9	Yŏmt'an	염탄 (鹽灘)			
65.2	9.6	62.4	8.3	Sinjumak	신주막 (新酒幕)			
71.9	6.7	69.2	6.8	Hakhyŏn	학현 (鶴峴)			
82.5	9.6	--	--	Changbang	장방 (長芳)			Paech'ŏn Line
90.3	7.8	75.6	6.4	East Haeju (Tonghaeju)	동해주 (東海州)			Paech'ŏn Line, Ongjin Line
91.4	1.1	--	--	Haeju Ch'ŏngnyŏn	해주청년 (海州靑年)			
-	-	77.9	2.3	closed in 1958		Haeju	해주 (海州)	(Ongjin Line)
