= Samchon County =

Samch'ŏn County 삼천군
- County

Korean transcription(s)
  - Hanja: 三泉郡
  - McCune-Reischauer: Samch'ŏn-gun
  - Revised Romanization: Samcheon-gun
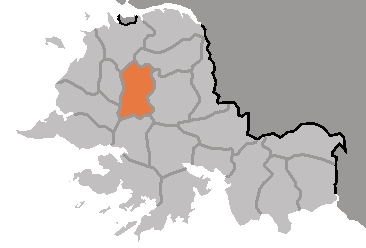
- Country: North Korea
- Province: South Hwanghae Province

Area
  - Total: 335.3 km^{2} (129.5 sq mi)

Population (2008)
  - Total: 86,042
  - Density: 256.6/km^{2} (664.6/sq mi)

Samch'ŏn County is a county in South Hwanghae province, North Korea.

== Administrative divisions ==
Samch'ŏn county is divided into 1 ŭp (town) and 19 ri (villages):

- Samch'ŏn-ŭp
- Ch'urŭng-ri
- Koejŏng-ri
- Kohyŏl-li
- Kŭmch'ŏl-li
- Kunghŭng-ri
- Kunsal-li
- Pangnam-ri
- Ryongam-ri
- Ryongch'ŏl-li
- Ryŏnp'yŏng-ri
- Sinmyŏng-ri
- Sugyo-ri
- Sujang-ri
- Talch'ŏl-li
- Tobong-ri
- Tŏkch'ŏl-li
- Tomyŏng-ri
- T'app'yŏng-ri
- Wŏlbong-ri

== Transportation ==
Sam county is served by the Ŭllyul Line of the Korean State Railway.
