= Sariwon =

Sariwŏn 사리원시
- Municipal city

Korean transcription(s)
  - Chosŏn'gŭl: 사리원시
  - Hancha: 沙里院市
  - McCune-Reischauer: Sariwŏn-si
  - Revised Romanization: Sariwon-si
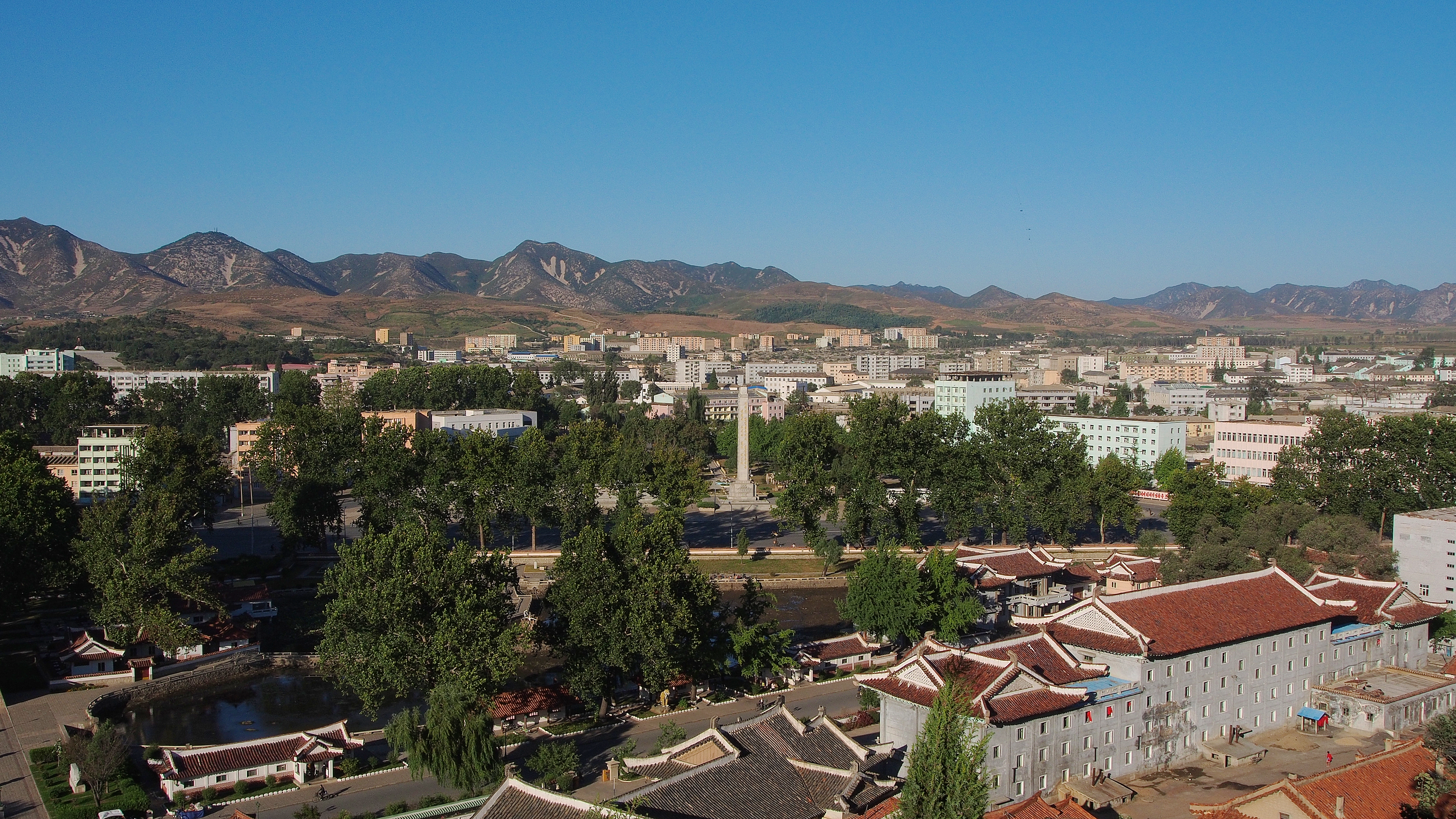
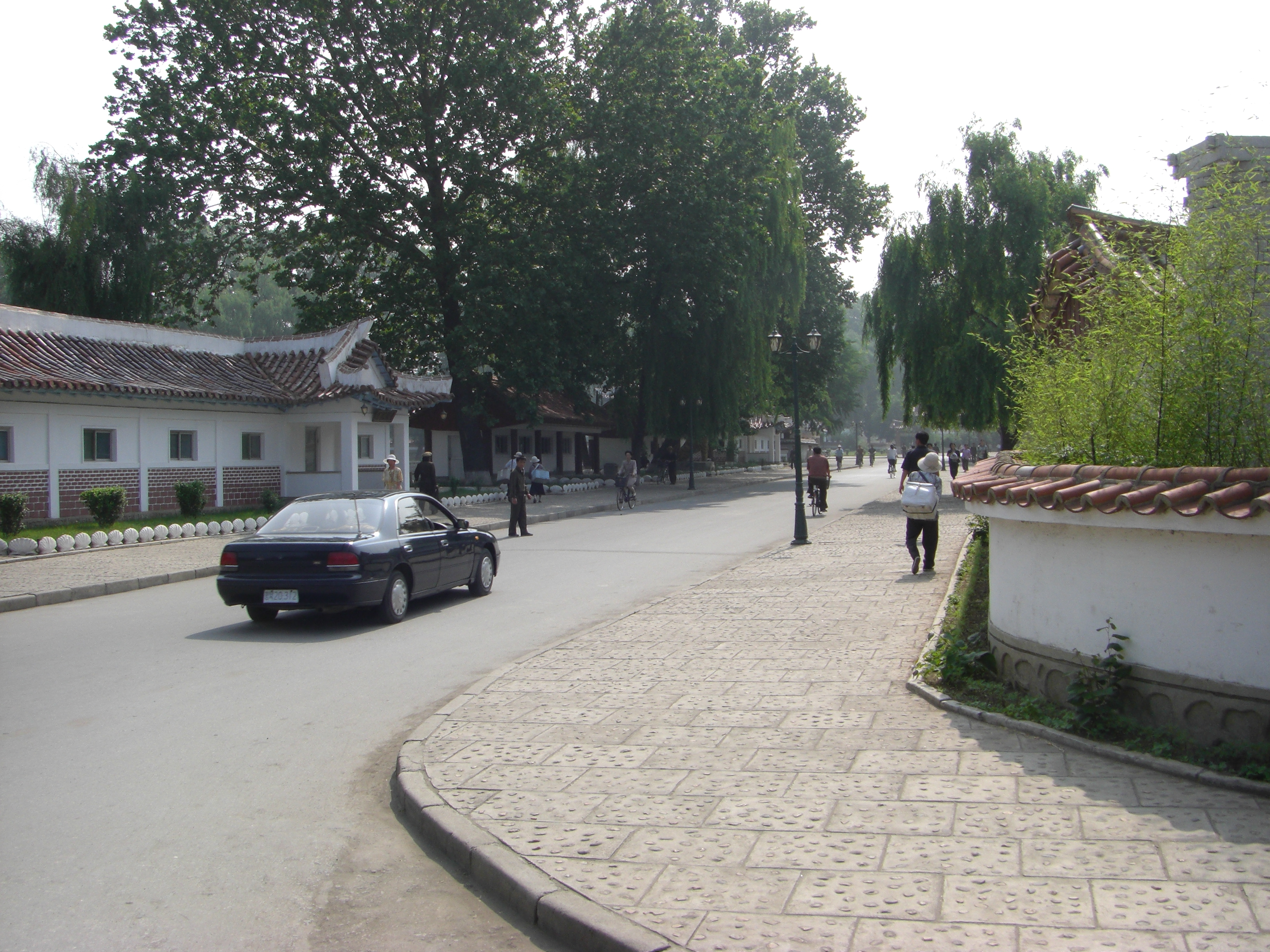
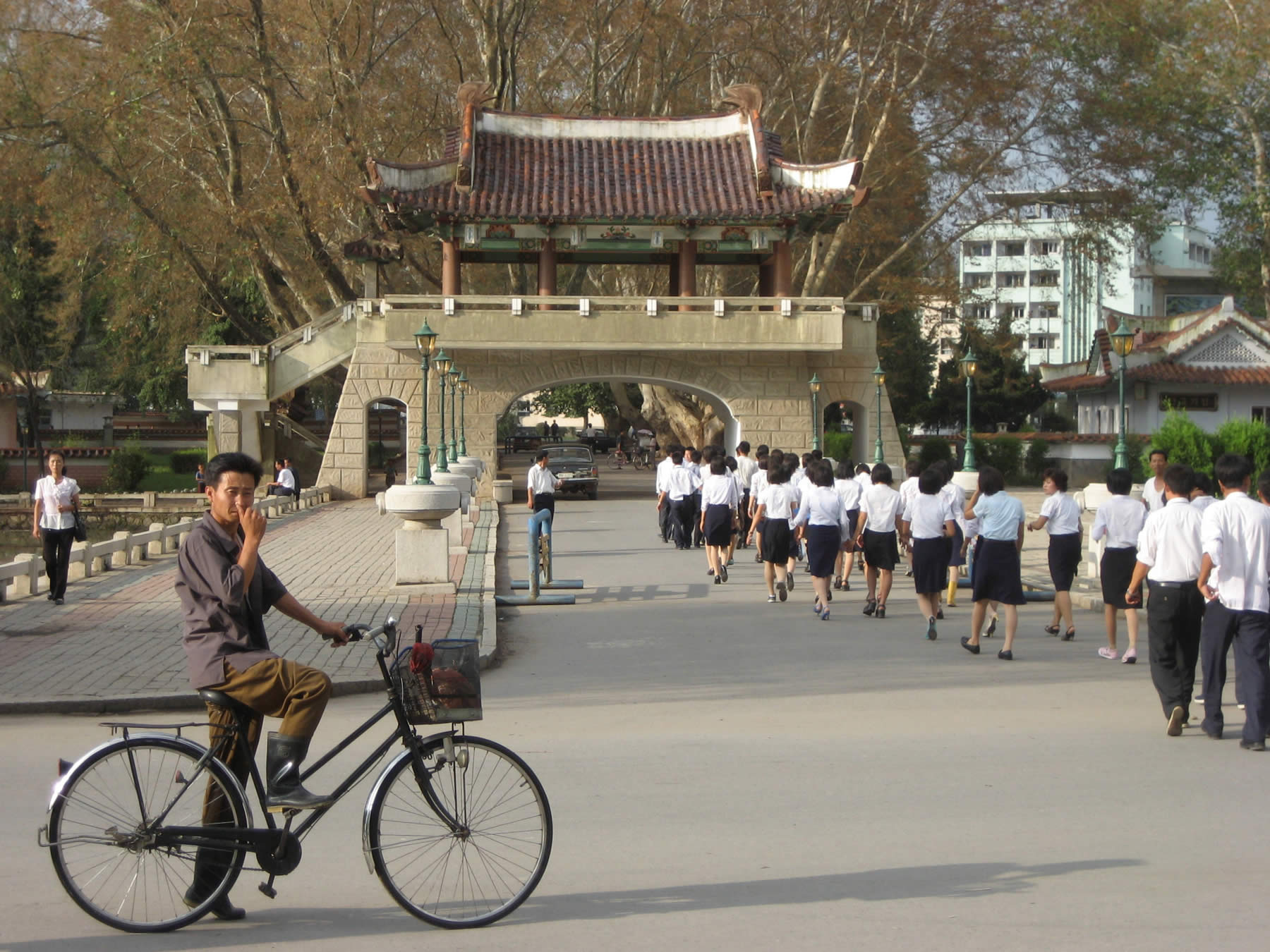
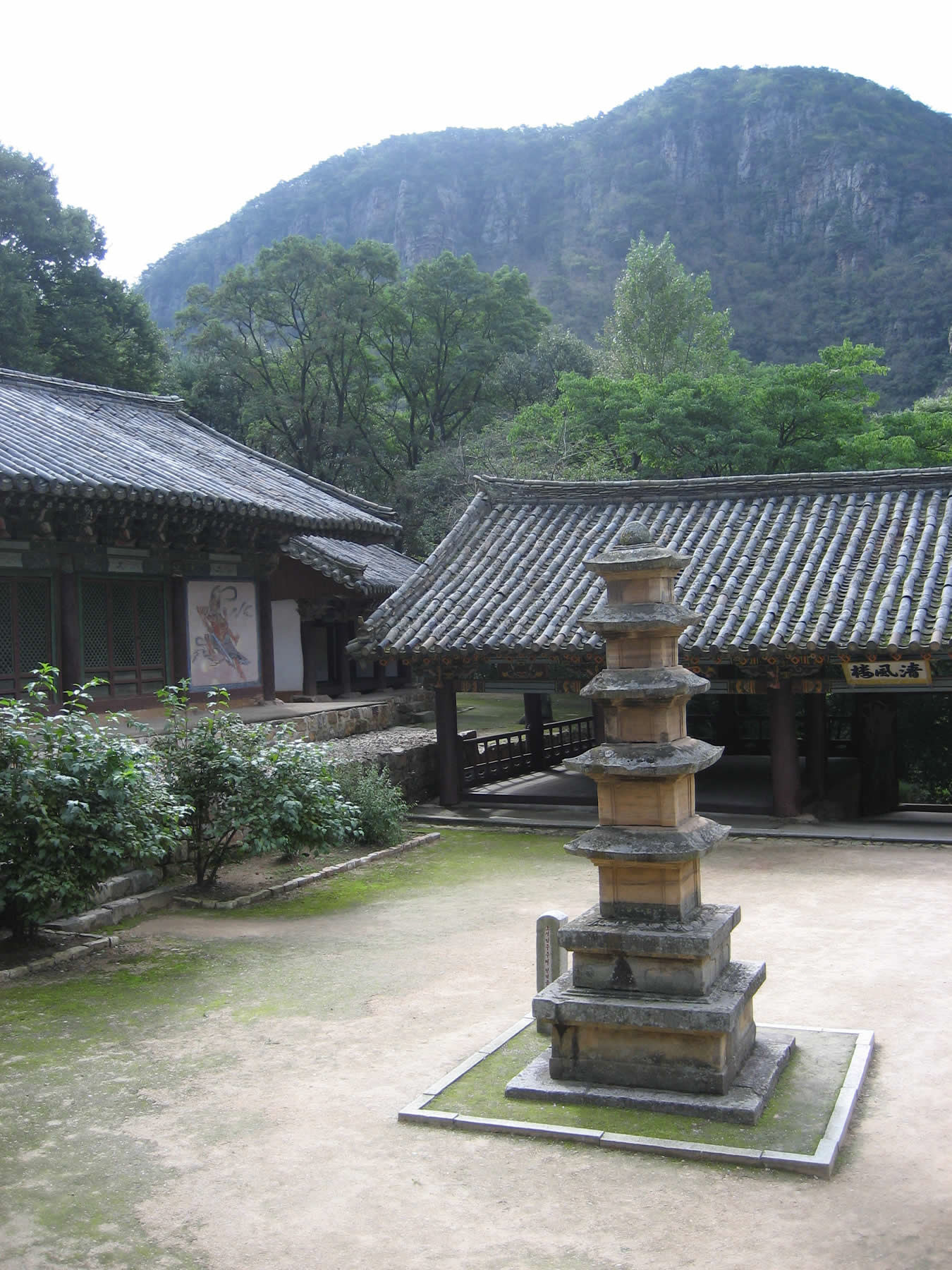
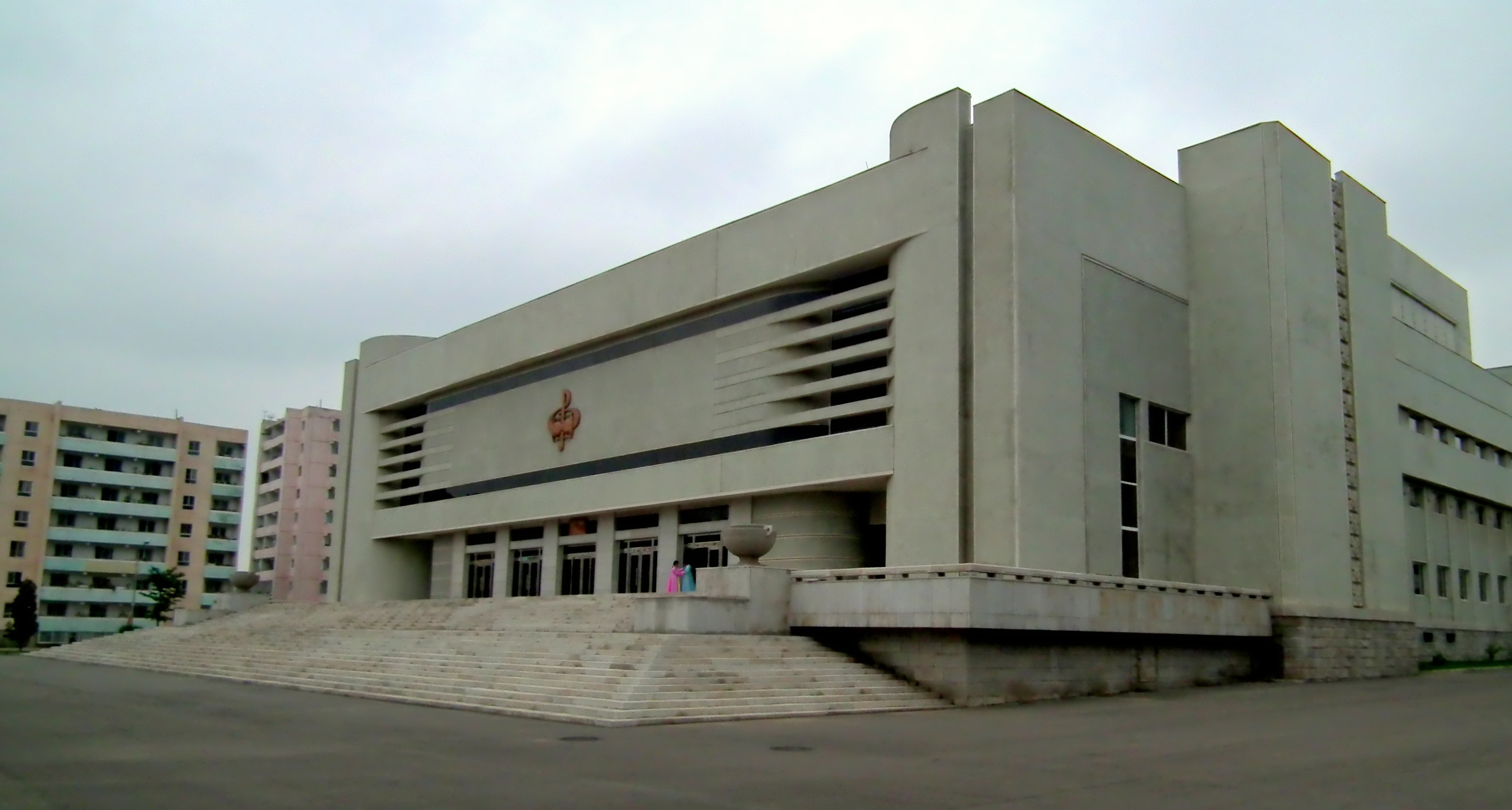
- View of Sariwon Sariwon Folk Village street in Sariwon Songbul Temple North Hwanghae Province Art Theatre

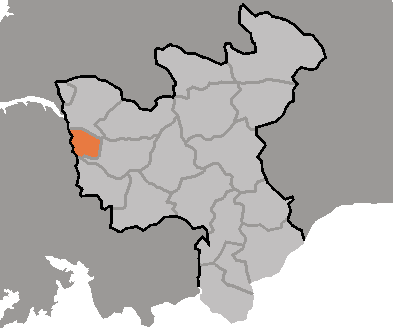
- Map of North Hwanghae showing the location of Sariwon

- Location within North Korea
- Coordinates: 38.50778°N 125.75444°E
- Country: North Korea
- Province: North Hwanghae Province

Population (2008)
  - Total: 307,764
  - Dialect: Hwanghae
- Time zone: UTC+9 (Pyongyang Time)

Sariwŏn (Korean: 사리원; Korean pronunciation: [sa.ɾi.wʌn]) is a city in North Korea. It is the capital and largest city of North Hwanghae Province.

== Population ==
The city's population as of 2008 is 307,764.

== Administrative divisions ==
Sariwŏn is divided into 31 tong (neighbourhoods) and 9 ri (villages):

- Ch'ŏlsan-dong
- Kuch'ŏn 1-dong
- Kuch'ŏn 2-dong
- Kuch'ŏn 3-dong
- Kuch'ŏn 4-dong
- Kwangsŏng-dong
- Kyŏng'am-dong
- Man'gŭm-dong
- Ŏsu-dong
- Puk 1-dong
- Puk 2-dong
- Puk 3-dong
- Puk 4-dong
- Sangha-dong
- Sangmae 1-dong
- Sangmae 2-dong
- San'ŏp-tong
- Sinch'ang-dong
- Sinhŭng 1-dong
- Sinhŭng 2-dong
- Sinyang-dong
- Sŏngmun-dong
- Sŏri-dong
- Taesŏng-dong
- Tong 1-dong
- Tong 2-dong
- Torim-dong
- Ŭnbyŏl-dong
- Unha 1-dong
- Unha 2-dong
- Wŏnju-dong
- Chŏngbang-ri
- Haesŏ-ri
- Kuryong-ri
- Migong-ri
- Munhyŏl-li
- Pungŭi-ri
- Sŏnch'ŏng-ri
- Sŏngsal-li
- Taeryong-ri

== Healthcare ==
Sariwŏn has the only pediatric hospital (founded by Hungarians in the 1950s) in the entire region; it serves 16 districts and 500,000 children and teens annually.

== Industry ==
Sariwŏn has a Potassic/Potash Fertilizer Complex and a tractor factory.

== Education ==
Several institutions of higher education are based in Sariwŏn, including the Kye Ung-sang University, the Sariwŏn University of Geology, the Sariwŏn University of Medicine, the Sariwŏn University of Education no. 1 & no. 2, and the Sariwŏn Pharmaceutical College of Koryŏ.

== Tourism ==
The "Sariwŏn Folklore street" was constructed during Kim Jong-il's rule. Built to display an ideal picture of ancient Korea, it includes buildings in the "historical style" and a collection of ancient Korean cannons. Many older style Korean buildings exist in the city.

In 2020, Jongbangsan Hotel opened after several years of delays in construction. It has three main buildings and includes a gym and a swimming pool.

== Transport ==
Sariwŏn is served by Sariwŏn Ch'ŏngnyŏn and several other stations on both the P'yŏngbu and Hwanghae Ch'ŏngnyŏn lines of the Korean State Railway.

Sariwŏn has a trolleybus system with two Ikarus 280T articulated trolleybuses; they were converted from diesel Ikarus 280 buses due to the lack of roof equipment. Regular trolleybuses were mothballed at the depot from 2020. The service is supplemented by regular buses.

== Climate ==
Sariwŏn has a humid continental climate (Köppen climate classification: Dwa).

Climate data for Sariwŏn (1991–2020)
Month	Jan	Feb	Mar	Apr	May	Jun	Jul	Aug	Sep	Oct	Nov	Dec	Year
Mean daily maximum °C (°F)	0.1 (32.2)	3.5 (38.3)	9.9 (49.8)	17.7 (63.9)	23.5 (74.3)	27.4 (81.3)	28.9 (84.0)	29.6 (85.3)	26.0 (78.8)	19.3 (66.7)	10.3 (50.5)	2.2 (36.0)	16.5 (61.7)
Daily mean °C (°F)	−4.8 (23.4)	−1.8 (28.8)	4.1 (39.4)	11.3 (52.3)	17.3 (63.1)	21.8 (71.2)	24.6 (76.3)	24.9 (76.8)	20.1 (68.2)	13.2 (55.8)	5.3 (41.5)	−2.2 (28.0)	11.2 (52.2)
Mean daily minimum °C (°F)	−9.2 (15.4)	−6.5 (20.3)	−0.9 (30.4)	5.5 (41.9)	11.7 (53.1)	17.2 (63.0)	21.1 (70.0)	21.2 (70.2)	15.2 (59.4)	7.8 (46.0)	0.7 (33.3)	−6.2 (20.8)	6.5 (43.7)
Average precipitation mm (inches)	8.9 (0.35)	12.0 (0.47)	18.1 (0.71)	42.6 (1.68)	71.2 (2.80)	80.0 (3.15)	203.1 (8.00)	203.5 (8.01)	85.6 (3.37)	40.7 (1.60)	32.7 (1.29)	14.7 (0.58)	813.1 (32.01)
Average precipitation days (≥ 0.1 mm)	4.2	3.3	3.8	5.5	6.9	7.5	11.4	9.9	5.8	4.7	6.5	5.5	75.0
Average snowy days	4.8	3.2	1.3	0.3	0.0	0.0	0.0	0.0	0.0	0.1	2.2	5.6	17.5
Average relative humidity (%)	71.0	67.9	65.4	63.2	67.4	74.4	83.3	82.4	76.6	72.4	73.1	71.4	72.4
Source: Korea Meteorological Administration

== Sister cities ==
- Lahore, Pakistan
- Rafael Lara Grajales, Mexico
- Székesfehérvár, Hungary
