= Haeju Chongnyon station =

Railway station in Haeju City, North Korea

Haeju Ch'ŏngnyŏn 해주청년

Korean name
- Hangul: 해주청년역
- Hanja: 海州青年驛
- Revised Romanization: Haejucheongnyeon-yeok
- McCune–Reischauer: Haejuch'ŏngnyŏn-yŏk

General information
- Location: Haeju-si, South Hwanghae; North Korea
- Coordinates: 38.0343°N 125.7276°E
- Owner: Korean State Railway

History
- Opened: 1925

Services
Preceding station	Korean State Railway	Following station
East Haeju towards Sariwŏn Ch'ŏngnyŏn	Hwanghae Ch'ŏngnyŏn Line	Terminus
Wangsin towards Ongjin	Ongjin Line	Terminus
Location

Haeju Ch'ŏngnyŏn station (Korean: 해주청년) is the central railway station of Haeju City, South Hwanghae Province, North Korea. Haeju Ch'ŏngnyŏn station is the terminus of Hwanghae Ch'ŏngnyŏn Line and the origin station of Ongjin Line.
