= Sariwon Chongnyon station =

Railway station in North Korea

Coordinates: 38°30′10″N 125°45′52″E

Sariwŏn Ch'ŏngnyŏn 사리원청년
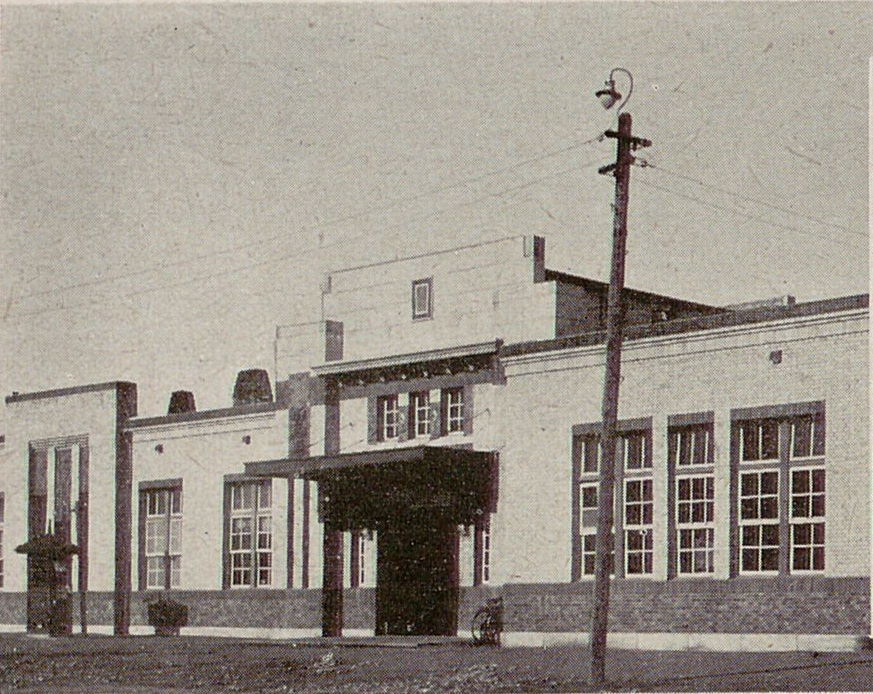

Korean name
- Hangul: 사리원청년역
- Hanja: 沙里院青年驛
- Revised Romanization: Sariwoncheongnyeon-yeok
- McCune–Reischauer: Sariwŏnch'ŏngnyŏn-yŏk

General information
- Location: Sariwŏn-si, North Hwanghae; North Korea
- Owner: Korean State Railway

History
- Opened: 1906

Services
Preceding station	Korean State Railway	Following station
Chŏngbang towards P'yŏngyang	P'yŏngbu Line	East Sariwŏn towards Kaesŏng
Terminus	Hwanghae Ch'ŏngnyŏn Line	Songsan towards Haeju Ch'ŏngnyŏn
Location

Sariwŏn Ch'ŏngnyŏn station is the central railway station of Sariwŏn, North Hwanghae province, North Korea. It is on located on the P'yŏngbu Line, which was formed from part of the Kyŏngŭi Line to accommodate the shift of the capital from Seoul to P'yŏngyang; though this line physically connects P'yŏngyang to Pusan via Dorasan, in operational reality it ends at Kaesŏng due to the Korean Demilitarized Zone. It is also the northern terminus of the Hwanghae Ch'ŏngnyŏn Line.

The station was opened in 1906, at the same time as the line itself. In 1945, when the division of Korea took place, Sariwŏn station became the end point of the North Korean section of the former Kyŏngŭi Line; however, at the end of the Korean War, with Kaesŏng becoming part of North Korea, the latter station became the terminus of the P'yŏngbu Line, as the line was renamed. It was given the current name, Sariwŏn Ch'ŏngnyŏn station, in 1974.
