= North Hwanghae Province =

Province of North Korea

North Hwanghae Province 황해북도
- Province

Korean transcription(s)
  - Chosŏn'gŭl: 황해북도
  - Hancha: 黃海北道
  - McCune-Reischauer: Hwanghaebuk-to
  - Revised Romanization: Hwanghaebuk-do
- Coordinates: 38°30′23″N 125°45′35″E
- Country: North Korea
- Region: Haeso
- Capital: Sariwon
- Subdivisions: 2 cities; 18 counties

Government
  - Party Committee Chief Secretary: Park Chang-ho (WPK)
  - Provincial Committee of the WPK: Pak Chang-ho
  - Provincial People's Committee Chairman: Kim Seon-il

Area
  - Total: 8,154 km^{2} (3,148 sq mi)

Population (2008)
  - Total: 2,113,672
  - Density: 259.2/km^{2} (671.4/sq mi)
- Time zone: UTC+9 (Pyongyang Time)
- Dialect: Hwanghae

North Hwanghae Province (Hwanghaebuk-to; Korean pronunciation: [ɸwa̠ŋ.ɦɛ.buk̚.t͈o̞], lit. "north Yellow Sea province") is a province of North Korea. The province was formed in 1954 when the former Hwanghae Province was split into North and South Hwanghae. The provincial capital is Sariwon. The province is bordered by Pyongyang and South Pyongan to the north, Kangwon to the east, Kaesong Industrial Region and South Korea's Gyeonggi Province to the south, and South Hwanghae southwest. In 2003, Kaesong Directly Governed City (Kaesong Chikhalsi) became part of North Hwanghae as Kaepung County. Later on in 2019, it was promoted as Special City (Kaesong T'ŭkpyŏlsi). Thus, it was separated from North Hwanghae.

== Administrative divisions ==
North Hwanghae is divided into 2 cities ("si") and 18 counties ("kun"). Three of these counties (Chunghwa, Kangnam, and Sangwon) were added to the province in 2010 after being split from Pyongyang. However, Kangnam was returned to Pyongyang in 2011.

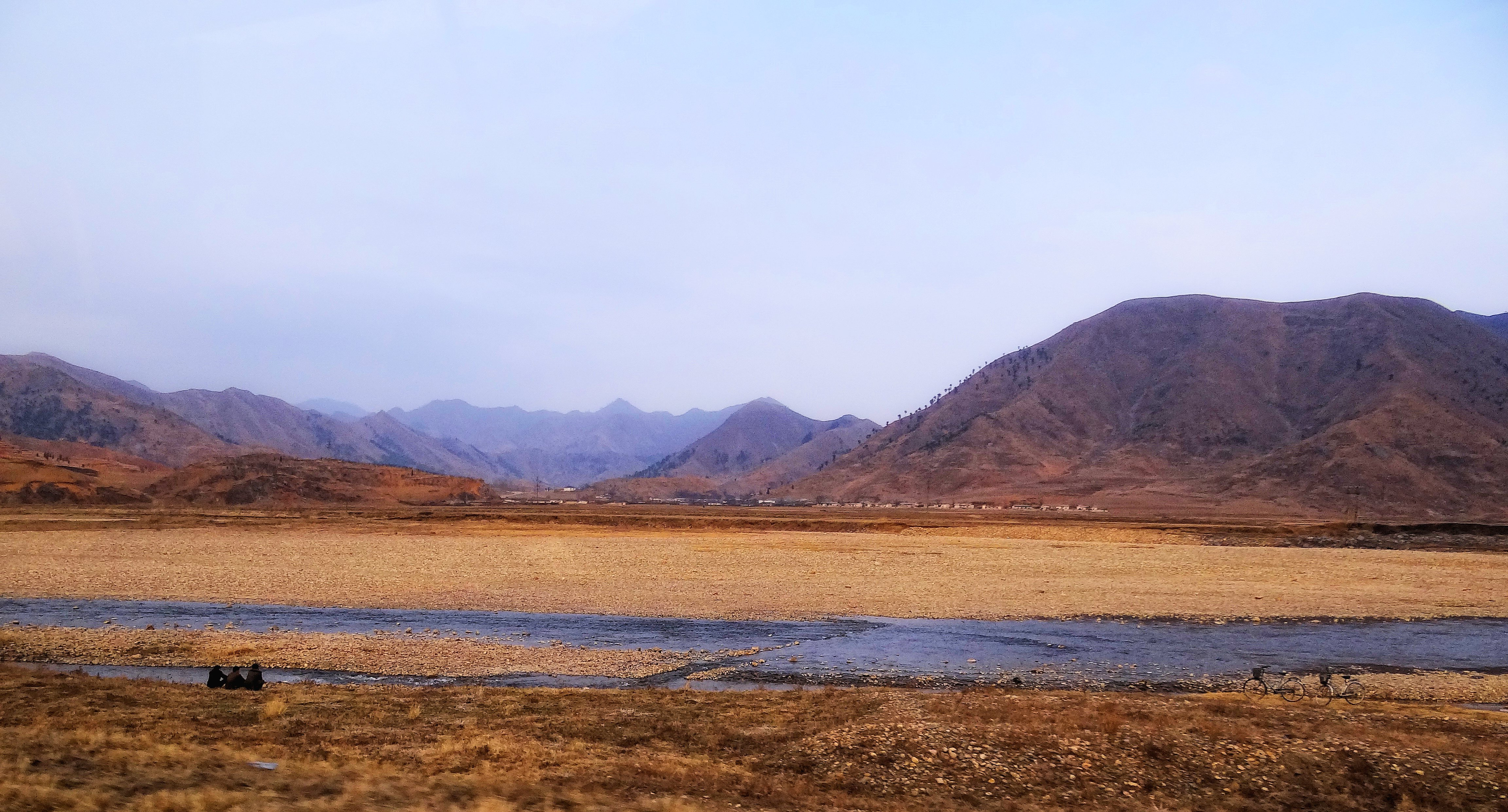
Landscape near Koksan in North Hwanghae Province, North Korea.

=== Cities ===
- Sariwon (capital)
  사리원시/沙里院市
- Songrim
  송림시/松林市

=== Counties ===
- Chunghwa County
  중화군/中和郡
- Hwangju County
  황주군/黃州郡
- Koksan County
  곡산군/谷山郡
- Kumchon County
  금천군/金川郡
- Pongsan County
  봉산군/鳳山郡
- Pyongsan County
  평산군/平山郡
- Rinsan County
  린산군/인산군/麟山郡
- Sangwon County
  상원군/祥原郡
- Singye County
  신계군/新溪郡
- Sinpyong County
  신평군/新坪郡
- Sohung County
  서흥군/瑞興郡
- Suan County
  수안군/遂安郡
- Sŭngho County 승호군 / 勝湖郡
- Tosan County
  토산군/兎山郡
- Unpa County
  은파군/銀波郡
- Yonsan County
  연산군/延山郡
- Yontan County
  연탄군/燕灘郡

== Transportation ==
North Hwanghae is connected to the rest of the country by way of the Pyongbu Railway Line (known in South Korea as the Kyongui Line), which, in theory, runs from Pyongyang to Pusan; however, in reality, the line is cut short by the Korean Demilitarized Zone. It is also served by several large highways, most notably the Pyongyang-Kaesong Motorway.

== Education ==
There are several higher-level educational institutions in North Hwanghae, all government-run. These include the Kye Ung Sang Sariwon University of Agriculture, the Sariwon University of Geology, and the Sariwon Teachers University.

== Culture ==
=== Historic landmarks ===
North Hwanghae has many historical relics as the site of the Koryo-dynasty capital at Kaesong, a depository for many famous historic relics. The province is also home to the tombs of many of the Koryo monarchs, the most famous being the tombs of kings Taejo and Kongmin, though others are spread throughout Kaesong and Kaepung county. Kaesong also houses the Koguryo-era Taehungsan Fortress, built to protect the kingdom's capital at Pyongyang and enclosing the famous Kwanum Temple. Nearby to Sariwin is the famous Jongbangsan Fortress, another Koguryo satellite for the defense of Pyongyang. This fortress encompasses the 9th-century Songbulsa Buddhist temple, one of the oldest and most picturesque in the country.
