= South Hwanghae Province =

Province of North Korea

South Hwanghae Province 황해남도
- Province

Korean transcription(s)
  - Chosŏn'gŭl: 황해남도
  - Hancha: 黃海南道
  - McCune-Reischauer: Hwanghaenam-do
  - Revised Romanization: Hwanghaenam-do
- Country: North Korea
- Region: Haeso
- Capital: Haeju
- Subdivisions: 1 cities; 19 counties

Government
  - Provincial Party Committee Chief Secretary: Park Tae-deok (WPK)
  - Provincial People's Committee Chairman: Kim Chol Bom

Area
  - Total: 8,450 km^{2} (3,260 sq mi)

Population (2008)
  - Total: 2,310,485
  - Rank: 5th
  - Density: 273/km^{2} (708/sq mi)
- Time zone: UTC+9 (Pyongyang Time)
- Dialect: Hwanghae

South Hwanghae Province (Hwanghaenamdo; Korean pronunciation: [ɸwaŋ.ɦɛ.nam.do], lit. "south Yellow Sea province") is a province in western North Korea. The province was formed in 1954 when the former Hwanghae Province was split into North and South Hwanghae. The provincial capital is Haeju.

== Geography ==
The province is part of the Haeso region, and is bounded to the west by the Yellow Sea, and to the north and east by North Hwanghae province. Some administrative exclaves of Nampo City in the north of the province exist. The southern border of the province is marked by the Korean Demilitarized Zone with South Korea. The province draws its name from what were the largest cities in Hwanghae, Haeju and Hwangju; the name, which literally means "Yellow Sea" in Korean, also references the Yellow Sea, which forms the province's western bound.

The coastline of South Hwanghae is dotted by many small islands, many of which are uninhabited. Many of the largest islands, such as Baengnyeong-do are administered by South Korea. The Northern Limit Line, which runs through the region and demarcates a disputed maritime boundary between the north and south, is another frequent subject of contention between the two countries. The largest islands which indisputably belong to North Korea are Kirin-do, Changrin-do, and Sunwi-do.

The province, being not very mountainous, is uniquely suited to farming, and is thus often referred to as the "bread-basket" of North Korea. Much of the land is devoted to farming and thus was not hit as hard as other parts of the country during the Arduous March of the 1990s. Many types of vegetables, fruits, grains, and rice are grown on the region's plains; Kwail County, which means fruit in Korean, was founded to grow orchards.

Haeju, the provincial capital, is also the largest port in southern North Korea outside of Wonsan. The area is also home to several ancient burial mounds and cultural relics, such as the Kangsosa Buddhist temple, ancient stone pagodas, and a Koryo-era ice house. There are also many Iron Age dolmen and Koguryo tombs in the province, such as Anak Tomb No.3.

== Administrative divisions ==
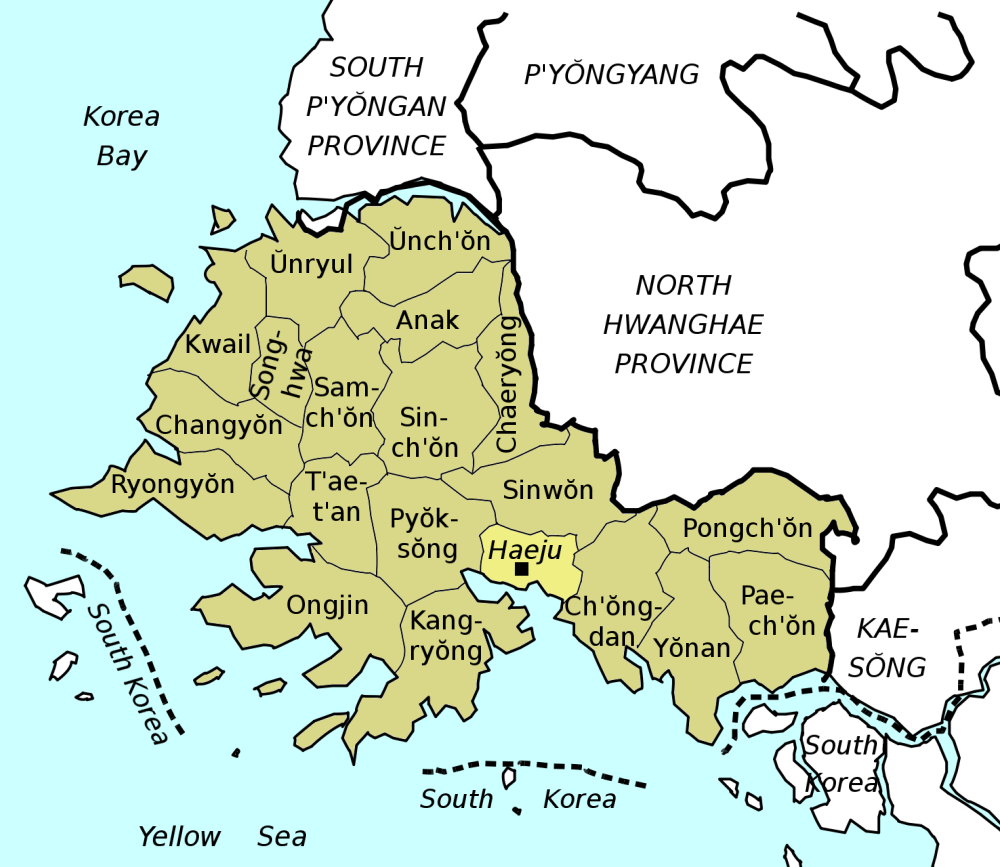
Counties and city of South Hwanghae Province

South Hwanghae is divided into 1 city (si) and 19 counties (gun). These are further divided into villages (ri) in rural areas and dong (neighborhoods) in cities, which are detailed on each county's individual page.

=== Cities ===
- Haeju (capital)
  해주시/海州市

=== Counties ===
- Anak County
  안악군/安岳郡
- Chaeryong County
  재령군/載寧郡
- Changyon County
  장연군/長淵郡
- Chongdan County
  청단군/青丹郡
- Kangryong County
  강령군/康翎郡
- Kwail County
  과일군/과일郡
- Ongjin County
  옹진군/甕津郡
- Paechon County
  배천군/白川郡
- Pongchon County
  봉천군/峰泉郡
- Pyoksong County
  벽성군/碧城郡
- Ryongyon County
  룡연군/龍淵郡
- Samchon County
  삼천군/三泉郡
- Sinchon County
  신천군/信川郡
- Sinwon County
  신원군/新院郡
- Songhwa County
  송화군/松禾郡
- Taetan County
  태탄군/苔灘郡
- Unryul County
  은률군/殷栗郡
- Ŭnch'ŏn-gun
  은천군/銀泉郡
- Yonan-gun
  연안군/延安郡

== See also ==
- Geography of North Korea
- An Jung-geun
