= Hanpo station =

Railway station in North Korea

Coordinates: 38°13′35″N 126°27′09″E

Hanp'o 한포

Korean name
- Hangul: 한포역
- Hanja: 汗浦驛
- Revised Romanization: Hanpo-yeok
- McCune–Reischauer: Hanp'o-yŏk

General information
- Location: Hanp'o-ri, P'yŏngsan County, North Hwanghae Province; North Korea
- Owner: Korean State Railway

History
- Opened: 3 April 1906

Services
Preceding station	Korean State Railway	Following station
Taebaeksansŏng towards P'yŏngyang	P'yŏngbu Line	Kŭmch'ŏn towards Kaesŏng
Location

Hanp'o station is a railway station located in Hanp'o-ri, P'yŏngsan County, North Hwanghae province, North Korea. It is on located on the P'yŏngbu Line, which was formed from part of the Kyŏngŭi Line to accommodate the shift of the capital from Seoul to P'yŏngyang; though this line physically connects P'yŏngyang to Pusan via Dorasan, in operational reality it ends at Kaesŏng due to the Korean Demilitarized Zone.

== History ==
The station was opened on 3 April 1906 on the bank of the Ryesŏng River.
