= Kumchon station =

Railway station in Kumchon County, North Korea

Kŭmch'ŏn 금천

Korean name
- Hangul: 금천역
- Hanja: 金川驛
- Revised Romanization: Geumcheon-yeok
- McCune–Reischauer: Kŭmch'ŏn-yŏk

General information
- Location: Kŭmch'ŏn-ŭp, Kŭmch'ŏn County, North Hwanghae Province; North Korea
- Coordinates: 38.1635°N 126.4755°E
- Owner: Korean State Railway

History
- Opened: 3 April 1908
- Former names: Kŭmgyo
- Original company: Chosen Government Railway

Services
Preceding station	Korean State Railway	Following station
Hanp'o towards P'yŏngyang	P'yŏngbu Line	Kyejŏng towards Kaesŏng
Location

Kŭmch'ŏn station is a railway station located in Kŭmch'ŏn-ŭp, Kŭmch'ŏn County, North Hwanghae province, North Korea. It is on located on the P'yŏngbu Line, which was formed from part of the Kyŏngŭi Line to accommodate the shift of the capital from Seoul to P'yŏngyang; though this line physically connects P'yŏngyang to Pusan via Dorasan, in operational reality it ends at Kaesŏng due to the Korean Demilitarized Zone.
