= Mulgae station =

Railway station in North Korea

Coordinates: 38.3764°N 126.3219°E

Mulgae 물개

Korean name
- Hangul: 물개역
- Hanja: 物開驛
- Revised Romanization: Mulgae-yeok
- McCune–Reischauer: Mulgae-yŏk

General information
- Location: P‘yŏngsan County, North Hwanghae Province; North Korea
- Owner: Korean State Railway

Services
Preceding station	Korean State Railway	Following station
Sŏhŭng towards P'yŏngyang	P'yŏngbu Line	Py'ŏngsan towards Kaesŏng
Location

Mulgae station is a railway station located in P‘yŏngsan County, North Hwanghae province, North Korea. It is on located on the P'yŏngbu Line, which was formed from part of the Kyŏngŭi Line to accommodate the shift of the capital from Seoul to P'yŏngyang; though this line physically connects P'yŏngyang to Pusan via Dorasan, in operational reality it ends at Kaesŏng due to the Korean Demilitarized Zone.
