= Taebaeksansong station =

Railway station in North Korea

Coordinates: 38°16′13″N 126°26′12″E

Taebaeksansŏng 태백산성

Korean name
- Hangul: 태백산성역
- Hanja: 太白山城驛
- Revised Romanization: Taebaeksanseong-yeok
- McCune–Reischauer: Taebaeksansŏng-yŏk

General information
- Location: Sansŏng-ri, P‘yŏngsan, North Hwanghae; North Korea
- Owner: Korean State Railway

History
- Opened: 20 December 1931
- Former names: P'yŏngsan
- Original company: Chosen Government Railway

Services
Preceding station	Korean State Railway	Following station
Py'ŏngsan towards P'yŏngyang	P'yŏngbu Line	Hanp'o towards Kaesŏng
Location

Taebaeksansŏng station is a railway station in Sansŏng-ri, P‘yŏngsan County, North Hwanghae province, North Korea. It is on the P'yŏngbu Line, which was formed from part of the Kyŏngŭi Line to accommodate the shift of the capital from Seoul to P'yŏngyang. Though this line physically connects P'yŏngyang to Pusan via Dorasan, in operational reality it ends at Kaesŏng due to the Korean Demilitarized Zone.

== History ==
The station was opened by the Chosen Government Railway on 20 December 1931 as P'yŏngsan station. It was renamed in July 1945, taking its name from the nearby Taebaeksan Fortress (No. 93 on the list of DPRK National Treasures).
