= DMZ Peace Link Train =

Tourist train in South Korea

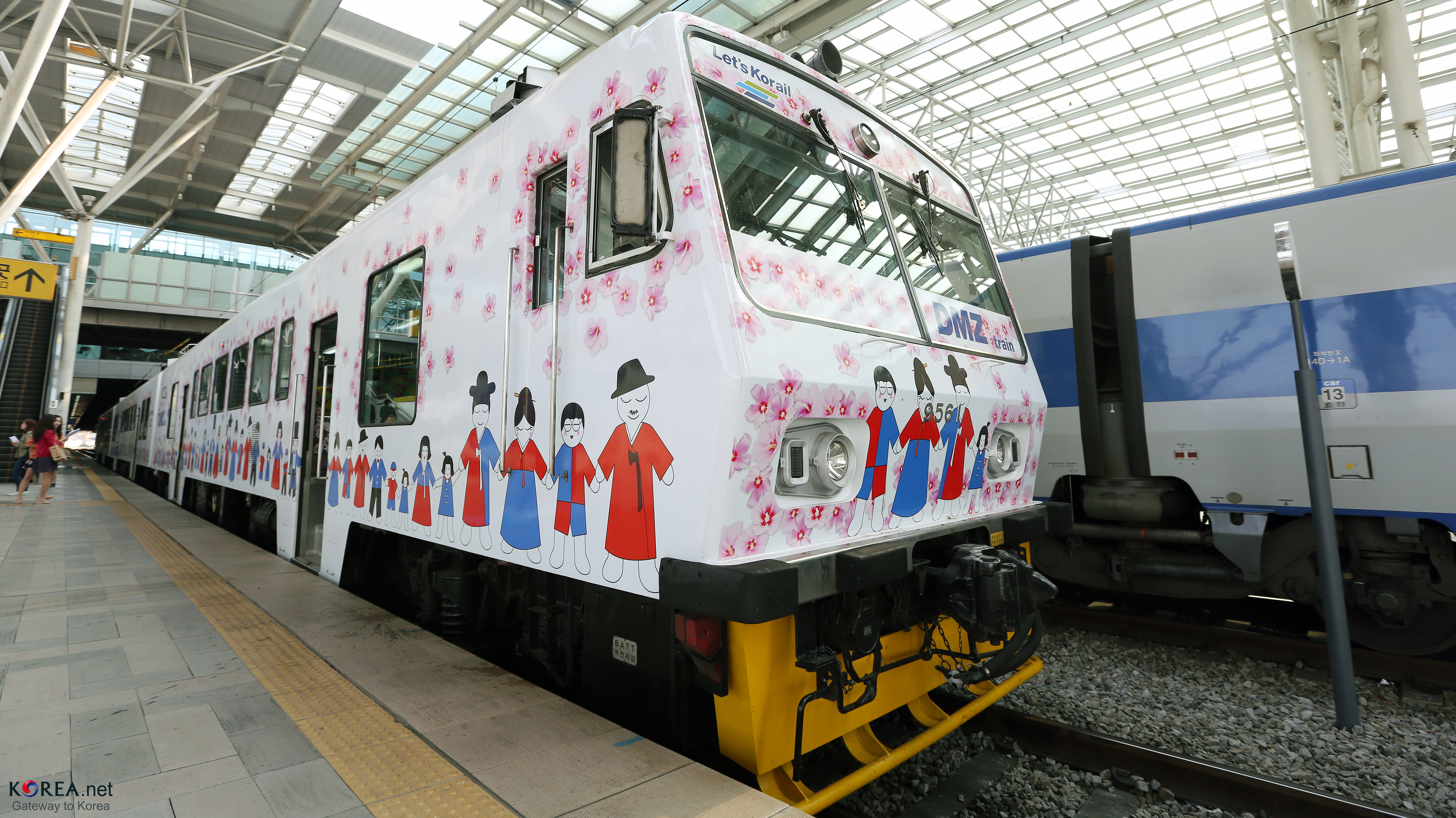
- The DMZ Train, or Peace Train, waiting at a platform.

Overview
- Service type: Tourist train Excursion train
- Locale: South Korea
- First service: May 4, 2014 (west); August 1, 2014 (east); April 10, 2026 (west, DMZ Peace Link Train)
- Last service: December 28, 2023
- Successor: DMZ Peace Link Train (April 10, 2026)
- Current operator: Korail

Route
- Termini: Seoul Station; Dorasan station
- Stops: 4
- Line used: Gyeongui Line

Technical
- Rolling stock: Current: Korail Class 381000; Former: Korail CDC
- Track gauge: 1,435 mm (4 ft 8 1/2 in) standard gauge

The DMZ Peace Link Train (aka Peace Train, Korean: 평화열차) is a South Korean excursion train operated by Korail. The train began operations in 2014 as the DMZ Train and transports tourists from Seoul to train terminals closest to the Korean Demilitarized Zone. The service was suspended in 2019 with the official end of operations being 28 December 2023. It resumed in 2026, between Seoul and Dorasan under the new name DMZ Peace Link Train.

== Overview ==
The first train opened on May 4, 2014, and travels on the Gyeongui Line, in South Korea's northwest, running from Seoul Station to Dorasan station. The train crosses the Imjingang Railroad Bridge on the Imjin River and arrives in Paju, Gyeonggi close to the DMZ. The North Korean city of Kaesong, where the defunct Kaesong industrial park is located, is 15 km (9.3 mi) away. At the Imjingang station passengers must debark for an identification check and head count because Dorasan is the only train station located within the civilian-restricted area.

The DMZ train ended a four-year break of passenger service to Dorasan station, started in April 2002 under the Sunshine Policy, and suspended by the Ministry of National Defense in 2010 after a person attempted crossing the DMZ into North Korea. The station is 205 km (127 mi) from Pyongyang and 56 km (35 mi) from Seoul and a sign there reads, "This is not the last station from the South, but the first station toward the North". Some tourist activities at the final stop are bus and walking tours to the Dorasan Peace Park, the Third Tunnel, and the Dora Observatory.

The second route opened on August 1, 2014, and travels 100 km (62 mi) on the Gyeongwon Line northeast from Seoul Station to Baengmagoji station, in Cheorwon County, Gangwon Province. It is the last station currently open on that line, followed by the now closed Woljeong-ri station in the DMZ, where visitors may tour, and Wonsan station, now located in North Korea, where trains used to arrive from Seoul in the early 20th century, but stopped after Korea's division. Some other off-train tour visits are White Horse Hill and Cheorwon Peace Observatory.

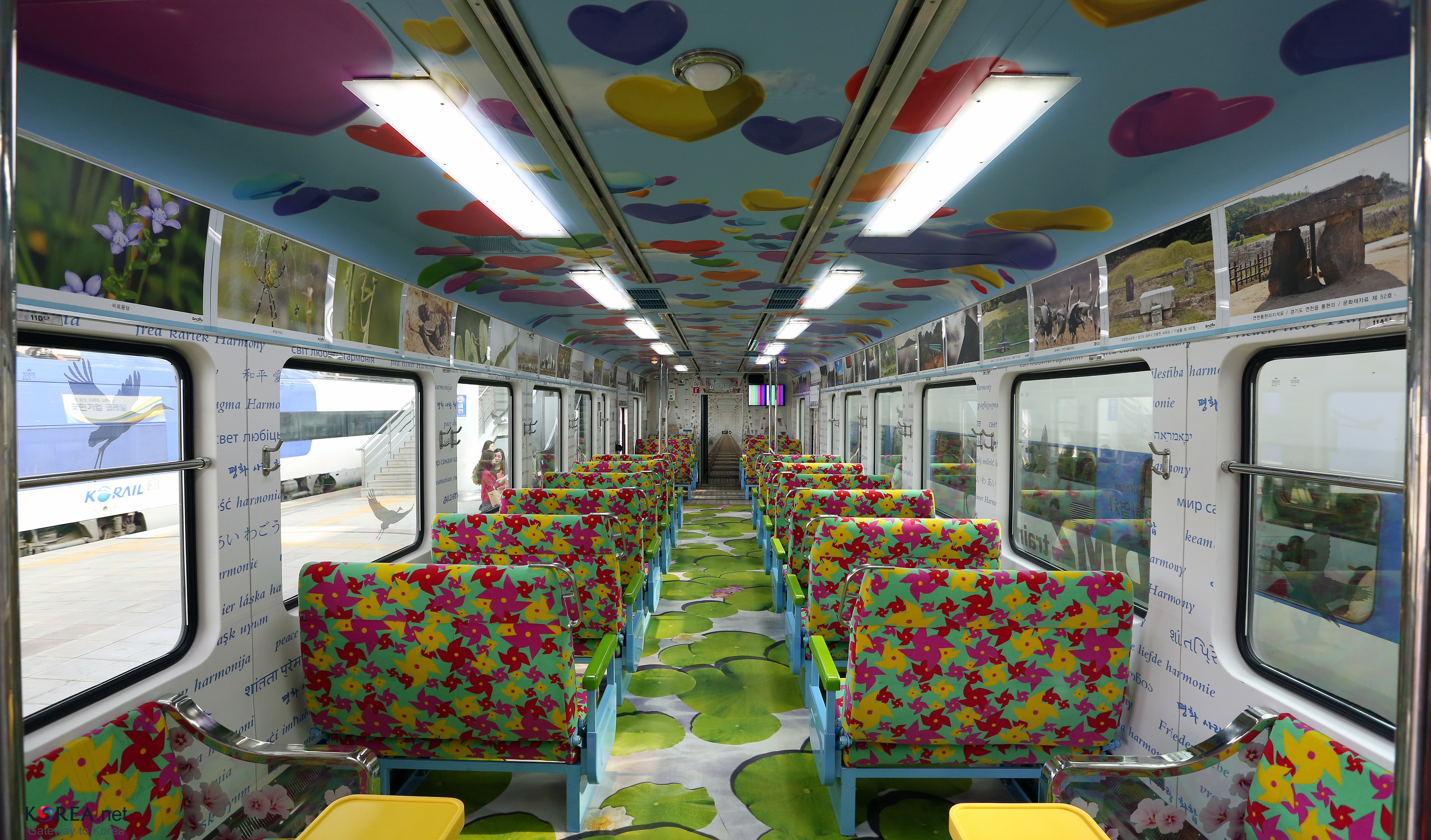
DMZ Train interior

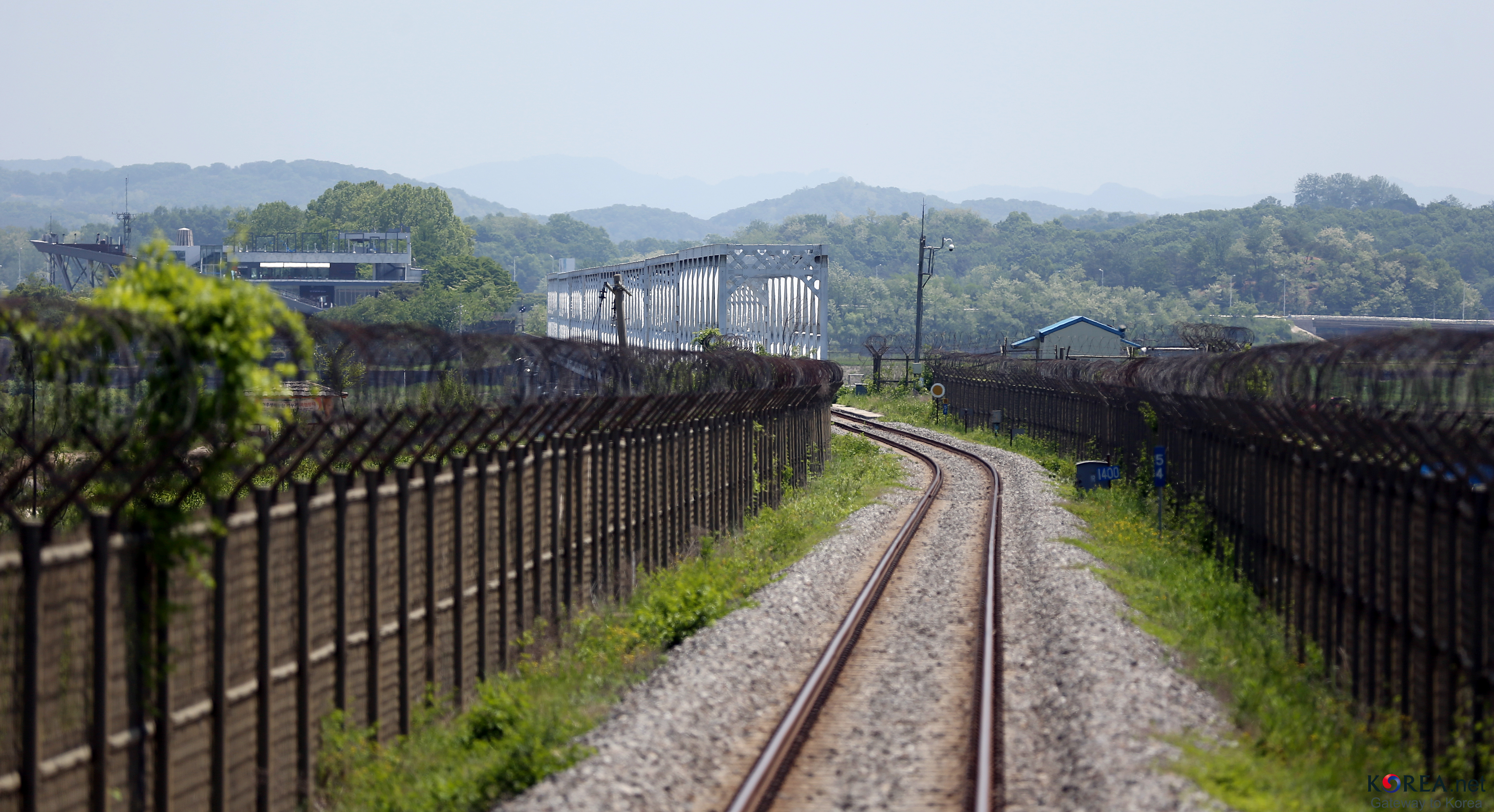
Imjingang Railroad Bridge

The train had three themed cars: "Peace Car" with a rusty steam train motif symbolizing the separation of the Korean peninsula, "Harmony Car", with paintings of red and blue figurines holding hands, and "Love Car" with paintings of adults and children from across the globe, also, holding hands. Inside the cars, ceilings are covered with pinwheels, and walls display photographs of the DMZ, with themes of war, trains, and ecology.

== Reception ==
Soon after the opening of the first route to Dorasan station, on June 11, 2014, Song In-geol of The Hankyoreh reported ridership of around 10,000 for the first month, and the trip's significance, "...for South Koreans who moved here from the North, it is the road home, as well as memory lane; for young people and families, it is a way to experience the separation of the peninsula; for visitors from overseas, it is a journey motivated by curiosity".

In July 2017, BBC News journalist Steve Evans called it "one of the most bizarre train journeys in the world", and said, "It is a political journey, it is designed to make the point that the train goes and can go no further".

== Operations ==
Gyeongui Line

- Started running: May 4, 2014 (April 10, 2026 under DMZ Peace Link Train)
- Stations: Seoul - Unjeong - Imjingang - Dorasan
- Approximate one-way travel time: 1 hour, 20 minutes.

=== Suspension and resumption ===
On April 1, 2019, the eastern service was suspended due to construction of the new double tracked & electrified alignment of the Gyeongwon Line between Dongducheon and Yeoncheon. On October 2, 2019, the western service was suspended due to concerns about an outbreak of African swine fever, as requested by Paju.

A new tourist train, renamed the DMZ Peace Link Train, began operating between Seoul and Dorasan on April 10, 2026, with financial support from South Korea’s Ministry of Unification and the city of Paju and with a frequency of one train every two weeks, which may be increased to one train per week during peak season. The ride is part of a tour package by Korail that includes visits to tourist sites within the Civilian Control Zone, and the train cannot be boarded independently.
