= Kyejong station =

Railway station in North Korea

Coordinates: 38.0668°N 126.4543°E

Kyejŏng 계정

Korean name
- Hangul: 계정역
- Hanja: 鷄井驛
- Revised Romanization: Gyejeong-yeok
- McCune–Reischauer: Kyejŏng-yŏk

General information
- Location: Kyejŏng-ri, Kŭmch'ŏn County, North Hwanghae Province; North Korea
- Owner: Korean State Railway

History
- Opened: 3 April 1906

Services
Preceding station	Korean State Railway	Following station
Kŭmch'ŏn towards P'yŏngyang	P'yŏngbu Line	Ryŏhyŏn towards Kaesŏng
Location

Kyejŏng station is a railway station located in Kyejŏng-ri, Kŭmch'ŏn County, North Hwanghae province, North Korea. It is on located on the P'yŏngbu Line, which was formed from part of the Kyŏngŭi Line to accommodate the shift of the capital from Seoul to P'yŏngyang; though this line physically connects P'yŏngyang to Pusan via Dorasan, in operational reality it ends at Kaesŏng due to the Korean Demilitarized Zone.
