= Pyeongsan Lee clan =

Korean clan from Hwanghae Province

- Country: Korea
- Current region: Pyongsan County
- Founder: Lee Bu myeong

Pyeongsan Lee clan (Korean: 평산 이씨; Hanja: 平山 李氏) was one of the Korean clans. Their Bon-gwan was in Pyongsan County, Hwanghae Province. According to the research in 2000, the number of Pyeongsan Lee clan was 3394. Their founder was Lee Bu myeong. He was one of eight followers dispatched to Silla by Xue Rengui in Tang dynasty. Then, he was settled in Pyeongsan, and taught studies, and was called as Doctorate.

== See also ==
- Korean clan names of foreign origin
