= Torasan =

Torasan may refer to:

- Tora-san (寅さん), a fictional character in the Japanese film Otoko wa Tsurai yo
- Torasan (도라산), the McCune–Reischauer transcription of Dorasan, South Korea
