= Bombing of the North-South Joint Railway and Highway =

Incident in Korea in 2024

- Date: October 15, 2024; 2 years ago
- Location: North Korea
- Type: Bombing
- Participants: Korean People's Army

On 15 October 2024, North Korea destroyed parts of the Gyeongui Line on the west coast, and the Donghae Line, located on the east coast, which connected the country to South Korea. At 9:45 AM on 9 October, the North Korean government notified United States forces in South Korea that it would completely sever the road and railway connecting the North and South Korean borders. While North Korea was cutting off traffic on both sections, the Workers' Party of Korea accused the South Korean government of using drones to fly over Pyongyang and violating North Korea's sovereignty. North Korea then dispatched the Korean People's Army to destroy parts of the northern section of the Military Demarcation Line on 15 October. This action is considered to have worsened relations between North and South Korea and heightened tensions on the Korean Peninsula.

== Background ==
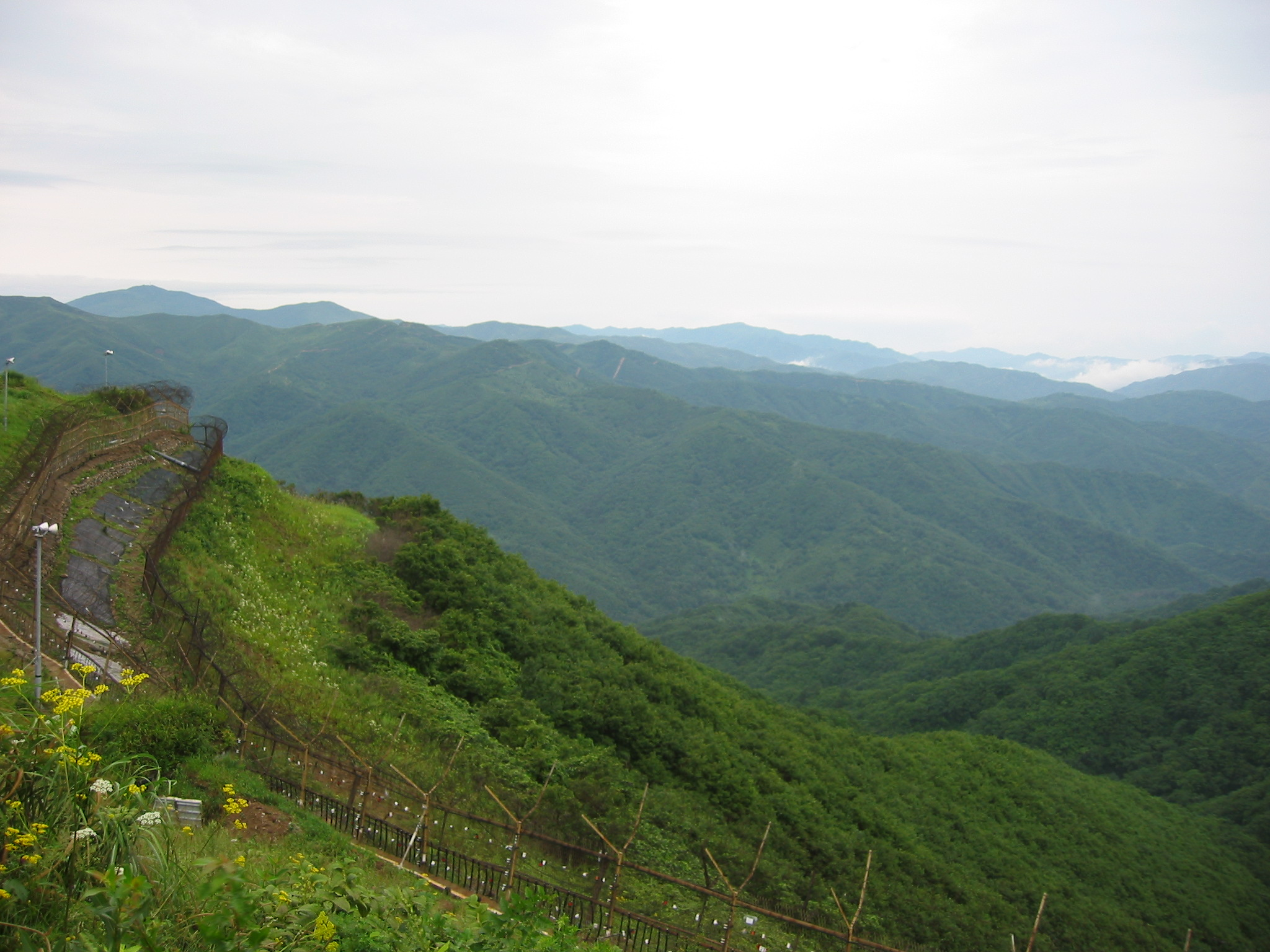
In 2024, North Korea was accused of planting mines in the Korean Demilitarized Zone (DMZ).

On 14 June 2003, the two governments of Korea held a ceremony to connect the Donghae Line and the Gyeongui Line between South Korea and North Korea. The two lines were subsequently opened on 1 December 2004 and 11 December 2007, respectively. In June 2020, North Korea blew up the Inter-Korean Liaison Office, allegedly because it was dissatisfied with defectors using balloons to spread political leaflets. On 23 November 2023, the North Korean government announced that it would no longer be bound by the 19 September Military Agreement, signed at the September 2018 inter-Korean summit. The South Korean government also suspended the 19 September Military Agreement at a cabinet meeting held on 4 June 2024.

In a speech at the end of 2023, Kim Jong Un, General Secretary of the Workers' Party of Korea, said that "North and South Korea are no longer of the same ethnicity, and that unification—which the Republic of Korea pursues as a state policy of "absorption unification"—will never be achieved." He further characterized South Korea as "the unchanging main enemy" and stated that nuclear forces would be used to subjugate its entire territory. Subsequently, in January 2024, Kim Jong Un further stated that "it is time to regard South Korea as the most hostile country" and that "North Korea has no intention of avoiding war." In response to the incident of North Korea dropping balloons containing feces into South Korea in 2024, the government of President Yoon Suk Yeol restarted "psychological warfare" against North Korea in mid-2024. In April 2024, the South Korean Armed Forces accused North Korea of planting mines near the Donghae Line, Gyeongui Line railway and Arrowhead Hill in Gangwon Province. Afterwards, South Korea raised the danger of drifting mines with the United Nations Command and requested that relevant information be transmitted to North Korea, but North Korea refused to contact them.

In June 2024, the South Korean government claimed to have received information that the North Korean government intended to dismantle the Gyeongui Line and Donghae Line railway and road sections. On 9 October 2024, at 9:45 a.m., the General Staff Department of the Korean People's Army, based on the experience of previous deaths caused by poor communication between the two Koreas, notified the United States forces in South Korea that North Korea would "completely cut off" the highways and railways connecting the North and South Korean borders. South Korea's Joint Chiefs of Staff stated that it would never sit idly by and watch North Korea attempt to unilaterally change the status quo regarding the "North Korean People's Army General Staff cutting off the highways and railways connecting to South Korea to carry out fortification and reinforcement projects." It also stated that North Korea would bear all the consequences. South Korea's Ministry of Unification stated that cutting off the highways and railways connecting to South Korea and gradually realizing "fortification" was "an act against unification and nationalism" and strongly condemned it.

=== North Korean complaints towards South Korea ===
On 11 October 2024, the Ministry of Foreign Affairs of North Korea issued an important statement criticizing South Korea for sending drones into the airspace over Jung-gu, Pyongyang, on the nights of 3 October, 9 October and 19 October, dropping a large number of anti-North Korea political propaganda leaflets and engaging in military provocation. Kim Yo Jong, deputy department director of the Central Committee of the Workers' Party of Korea, issued a statement saying that the South Korean government's claim that it had not yet figured out the situation, that "the military has not sent any drones to North Korea" and that "it needs to be confirmed whether it was done by civilian groups" was an attempt to shirk its responsibility, and that it would retaliate if South Korean drones were to reappear in Pyongyang. The Ministry of National Defense of North Korea responded to the position of the South Korean Ministry of National Defense, saying that it held an ambiguous attitude of neither denying nor admitting the situation, and was hesitant about whether civilian groups had the equipment to make drones fly over Pyongyang. Afterwards, Kim Yo Jong made another statement regarding South Korea sending drones to North Korea, saying that "the South Korean government is the culprit and the US government should bear the relevant responsibility". She then made a further statement responding to the South Korean Ministry of National Defense's statement that "the end of the regime" was a "major criminal act" that was determined to ignite the fuse of war.

=== South Korean government's response ===
After learning of North Korea's statement, South Korean Defense Minister Kim Yong-hyun attended the National Assembly's audit of the military court and stated that the South Korean military had not infiltrated North Korea with drones. The Joint Chiefs of Staff also stated that they would confirm whether a civilian organization carried it out. Subsequently, on 13 October, the Ministry of National Defense sent a brief message to its reporters entitled "Position Regarding North Korea's Kim Yo Jong Statement," stating that South Korea issued a stern warning to North Korea that if North Korea infringes on the safety of South Korean citizens, that day would be the day the North Korean regime is destroyed. At a press conference on 14 October, Joint Chiefs of Staff spokesman Lee Sung-joon stated that he had observed North Korean troops setting up roadblocks on the section of road involved and was also paying attention to the movement of North Korean artillery guns near the northern boundary line of the Yellow Sea. He said, "If North Korea provokes, we can take the initiative and launch a strong counterattack."

== Events ==
External videos
- Footage of North Korea blowing up a connecting highway

On the evening of 13 October, the North Korean Ministry of National Defense stated that the General Staff Department of the Korean People's Army had issued instructions to front-line troops to prepare to fire. The South Korean Ministry of National Defense stated that it had not yet received any alerts from the Jindo dogs or issued any instructions to strengthen the alert posture. The Joint Chiefs of Staff subsequently stated that it had received intelligence that the North Korean side might blow up the Gyeongui Line and Donghae Line railways. It further pointed out that the front-line troops announced by the North Korean side were eight artillery brigades with about 570 long-range guns deployed along the entire western to eastern armistice line, targeting the Seoul metropolitan area.

On 14 October, North Korean leader Kim Jong Un convened a meeting on defense and security, outlining the direction of the DPRK's current military activities and proposing major tasks in activating national defense forces and exercising the right of self-defense to safeguard national sovereignty and security interests. Kim Yo Jong subsequently issued another statement on 15 October, saying that "there is sufficient evidence that the drone flight was carried out by South Korea and that South Korea will pay a heavy price." On the same day, the South Korean Joint Chiefs of Staff sent a message to the media confirming that the DPRK had blown up sections of the Gyeongui Line and the Donghae Line north of the Military Demarcation Line at noon on the same day. The South Korean military fired warning shots after the DPRK destroyed some sections of the road.

North Korean media remained silent on the relevant information afterward. Until 17 October, the Korean Central News Agency reported that the General Staff Department of the Korean People's Army, in accordance with Order No. 00122 of the Central Military Commission of the Workers' Party of Korea, took measures to completely cut off the sections of highways and railways connecting with South Korea in the eastern and western regions of the southern border. It quoted a spokesperson for the Ministry of National Defense as saying that it completely sealed off a 60-meter section of highways and railways in the area of Ganhu-ri, Kosong County, Kangwon Province, and a 60-meter section of highways and railways in the area of Dongnei-ri, Panmun District, Kaesong City, by means of explosives. It stated that this action was "a constitutional requirement to define the Republic of Korea as a completely hostile country " and a necessary and legal measure based on the serious security environment of being on the verge of unpredictable war due to the serious political and military provocations of hostile forces. When Kim Jong Un inspected the 2nd Army of the Korean People's Army on 17 October, he said that destroying and cutting off the roads and railways connecting South Korean territory not only means physical closure, but also means "severing the bitter ties that have been intertwined with Seoul for centuries". He also warned that if South Korea violates North Korean sovereignty, it will "use force without any conditions and it will be a legitimate retaliatory action against an enemy country rather than a fellow countryman".

After the explosion, only the Joint Security Area and Arrowhead Hill remained as land routes connecting North and South Korea. However, Arrowhead Hill was of no practical significance because vehicles could not pass through it. After the explosion, the Korean People's Army also dispatched other vehicles to the site to demolish nearby roads. The explosion affected both highways and railway sections. The South Korean Joint Chiefs of Staff analyzed that the North Korean army used TNT explosives and only set up a fragile black barrier about 10 meters before the Military Demarcation Line. The impact of the explosion extended south of the Military Demarcation Line, violating the Korean Armistice Agreement. The Dong-A Ilbo pointed out that its reporters observed from the Goseong Unification Observatory in Gangwon Province on 23 Octoberthat the North Korean side mobilized more than 100 North Korean soldiers and heavy equipment such as trucks and excavators at the explosion site on the Donghae Line to set up structures and began to build a concrete barrier wall on the spot. On 4 November, the South Korean Joint Chiefs of Staff pointed out that the South Korean military observed through surveillance equipment that North Korea had deployed 300 to 400 personnel and heavy equipment to dig anti-tank ditches every day up to 1 November. It speculated that North Korea believed that in the event of an emergency, North Korea could fill the ditches with earth and then directly invade southward. Furthermore, it pointed out that North Korea had also built low mounds behind the north side of each anti-tank ditches to plant trees. South Korea could also deploy armored bridge-laying vehicles or advanced tanks through flanking maneuvers.

== Aftermath ==
=== Inter-Korean relations ===
The South Korean Ministry of Unification strongly condemned North Korea's actions, stating that although the facilities were representative of the construction of the 2000 inter-Korean summit, North Korea's repayment obligations still existed, and that North Korea's actions violated the relevant inter-Korean agreements. The Ministry of Unification subsequently stated that it would pursue legal responsibility for compensation for the damage caused by North Korea's destruction. After the incident, the South Korean government announced the emergency closure of tourist attractions in the Korean Demilitarized Zone (DMZ) on the border, including Daeseong-dong and the demonstration area Unification Village. To protect the safety of people in the border area, the Gyeonggi Provincial Government decided to designate 11 areas in Paju, Gimpo, Yeoncheon and other cities and counties as dangerous areas, prohibiting civic groups from airdropping leaflets and other items into North Korea in the designated areas. Joint Chiefs of Staff Chairman Kim Myung-soo canceled his visit to the United States as a result. On the morning of 14 October, the Extraordinary Situation Meeting, composed of senior members of South Korean civil society, held a press conference at the Seoul Press Center. Lee Boo-young, honorary chairman of the Free Speech Practice Foundation, who attended the press conference, advocated that "the National Assembly should investigate the truth through a national policy investigation" and said that "the National Assembly Speaker Group should call on the South and North Korean governments to exercise restraint, and National Assembly representatives can meet with the North Korean ambassador to China to convey South Korea's position."

At a press conference on 18 November, the Ministry of Unification stated that it was discussing with other departments of the South Korean government the compensation plan demanded from the North Korean government, and was discussing the scale of loans for the construction of the Gyeongui Line and the Donghae Line, and whether the North Korean government could be asked to repay the loans. It also indicated that the South Korean government would abandon showy dialogue and adopt pragmatic communication to effectively resolve the issues and ensure both sides could reach a consensus.

Since the Donghae Line highway was destroyed, North Korea cut off the power lines north of the military demarcation line on 24 November, connecting the South Korean city of Munsan with the North Korean Kaesong Industrial Complex Peace Substation. After an assessment, the South Korean military believed that North Korea's move was part of an operation to dismantle the power transmission towers. There are 48 power transmission towers in this section, 15 of which are in North Korea and were supplied with electricity to the North Korean Kaesong Industrial Complex by the Korea Electric Power Corporation in December 2006. South Korea's power supply has been interrupted twice. The first time was after North Korea conducted a nuclear test in January 2016, and South Korea cut off the power supply the following month. The power supply was partially restored as relations between North and South Korea eased. The second time was after North Korea destroyed the inter-Korean liaison office in June 2020, and South Korea did not restore the power supply until North Korea dismantled the power transmission towers.

=== International reaction ===
==== United Nations ====
United Nations Secretary-General António Guterres said after North Korea destroyed the connecting railway and highway that he was continuing to closely monitor the situation on the Korean Peninsula to deal with the situation. Kim Sun-kyung, North Korean Vice Foreign Minister in charge of international organizations, issued a statement, claiming that the demolition or construction of highways and railways on North Korean territory was "a legitimate exercise of sovereignty." He said that António Guterres' statement was about North Korea exercising its right to self-defense within its territory and that ignoring South Korea's violation of sovereignty was a "double standard" of the United Nations on the issue.

==== Japan and the United States ====
The United States Department of State spokesperson Matthew Miller stated on 15 October that it would continue to urge North Korea to de-escalate tensions and cease any actions that would increase the risk of armed conflict. Donald Trump, a candidate for the 2024 U.S. presidential election, posted on Truth Social that only he could solve the problem. Kazuhiko Aoki, the Deputy Chief Cabinet Secretary of Japan, said that these North Korean activities could increase tensions between the two Koreas and that it was important not to let them escalate.

==== China and Russia ====
Kremlin spokesman Dmitry Peskov said on 15 October after the incident that the North Korean–Russian Treaty on Comprehensive Strategic Partnership signed between Russia and the North Korean government during Russian President Vladimir Putin's visit to Pyongyang in June stipulated "strategic cooperation" in all areas. When asked whether Russia might support Pyongyang in the event of a conflict on the Korean Peninsula, he said the wording of the treaty was "very clear" and required no explanation. The South Korean government expressed regret over the statement made by the Russian government. Mao Ning, spokesperson for the Ministry of Foreign Affairs of China, said after the explosion that "the tense situation on the Korean Peninsula is not in the common interest of all parties, and the urgent task is to avoid further escalation of the conflict".

==== Other reactions ====
On 13 October, the South Korean Ministry of Foreign Affairs announced that a meeting of the vice foreign ministers of South Korea, the United States, and Japan was scheduled for 16 October. After the meeting, the three parties, including South Korean First Vice Foreign Minister Kim Hong-kyun, U.S. Deputy Secretary of State Kurt M. Campbell and Japanese Vice Foreign Minister Masataka Okano, strongly condemned North Korea's accusations that South Korean drones had infiltrated Pyongyang and destroyed the inter-Korean connecting road, which escalated the military tensions on the Korean Peninsula. After a meeting between South Korean Air Force Chief of Staff Lee Young-soo and U.S. Air Force Chief of Staff David W. Allvin at the South Korean Armed Forces Command Headquarters in Gyeryong on 17 October, they jointly condemned North Korea for undermining regional stability and agreed to consolidate the joint defense posture with overwhelming South Korean and U.S. air force forces and cooperate in dealing with the North Korean issue. The Korean Veterans Association stated after North Korea destroyed the joint liaison railway and road, calling for an end to further provocations and the restoration of cultural homogenization and dialogue to achieve peaceful reunification.

During the incident, South Korea's Democratic Party established a "Security Situation Response Team" within the party and issued a statement after the team meeting, saying that "the more sensitive the situation, the more calm the response is needed". Democratic Party spokesperson Hwang Jung-ah issued a written statement saying that "North and South Korea should put aside their confrontational stance and sit down at the negotiating table for dialogue". Reform Party deputy spokesperson Jeong Guk-jin commented that it was "like a fart-wielder getting angry" and called on the North Korean government to face up to the need for democratization and market opening, urging it to stop "acting like a thief crying 'stop thief'" and to engage in dialogue with South Korea. Progressive Party chief spokesperson Hong Sung-kyu issued a written statement saying that both sides must immediately stop all dangerous escalations of tensions that cannot be held accountable.

In addition, in response to North Korea's provocations and to strengthen sanctions against North Korea, South Korea, together with the United States, Japan, France, the United Kingdom, Germany, Italy, the Netherlands, Canada, Australia and New Zealand, formed a "multinational sanctions monitoring group". North Korean Foreign Minister Choe Son-hui issued a statement saying that the actions of the "multinational sanctions monitoring group" led by the United States undermined the foundation of international relations and seriously disrupted the international order. She also reiterated that the United States would pay the price for South Korea's criminal behavior regarding the "infiltration of South Korean drones into Pyongyang".

When Tsai Ming-yen, director of Taiwan's National Security Bureau, was questioned by the Legislative Yuan, he said that he had intelligence on the escalating situation on the Korean Peninsula and believed that "in the recent period, the relationship between North Korea and Russia has been actively improving and strengthening, while the relationship between China and North Korea is in a relatively low state.

=== Experts and scholars' reactions ===
Li Kaisheng, vice president of the Shanghai Institute for International Studies and vice president and secretary-general of the Shanghai Korean Peninsula Research Association, said that, from the perspective of the wishes of North and South Korea, the tension was still controllable. North Korea did not want to see an uncontrollable situation. Its main purpose was to create tension and make the United States and the international community realize that the U.S. President Joe Biden's administration's North Korea policy had failed. Yang Moojin, president of the North Korean National University, "this is the actual military measure related to the hostile two-state system that North Korea often mentions", and pointed out that North Korea may also seek to build more physical barriers along the border. Wenjia, chief secretary of the board of directors of Kainam University and senior advisor of the National Policy Research Institute, believes that if this military action is not effectively controlled, it may lead to an escalation of the situation and even trigger a larger-scale military conflict. Jeong Sang-chang, director of the Korean Peninsula Strategy Center of the Sejong Institute, analyzed that the Korean Wave influenced North Korean youth and led them to yearn for life in South Korea. He said that, to consolidate the regime, the Kim family firmly demonstrated its determination to sever relations between North and South Korea by blowing up the inter-Korean liaison road. Kim Jong-dae, a visiting professor at the Institute for Unification Studies at Yonsei University, believes that this series of events shows that civilian defector groups are evolving into "mercenaries" in the united-front work of the Yoon Seok-yeol government, playing a significant role in the government's actions. He also believes that the South Korean government has not stood on the front line, forming a new form of "gray zone harassment".

== Alleged image theft controversy ==
Yonhap News Agency published a report alleging that the explosion photos released by the Korean Central News Agency were stolen screenshots from the Joint Chiefs of Staff video. It also stated that the South Korean military's surveillance equipment captured North Korean military personnel being sent to the explosion site on the Gyeongui Line highway, but no personnel were seen at the explosion site on the Donghae Line highway. It further speculated that the North Korean authorities delayed the release of the news and used South Korean photos without authorization to "clean up the mess". Kim Yo Jong, of the Korean Central News Agency, said that North Korea could not take photos from that angle. She also stated that the photos were used because they were aesthetically pleasing and met North Korea's intentions. In the statement, she also said that the South Korean government did not answer the question of "what our explosion measures really mean, how serious the security crisis is, and where the true meaning of the situation is thrown". At a regular press conference, Kim In-ae, deputy spokesperson for the Ministry of Unification, responded to Kim Yo-jong's remarks, saying that "the North Korean government used the photos without permission or attribution" and that South Korean media paid for them through Japanese intermediaries. She also said that North Korea, as a signatory to the Berne Convention, should bear corresponding responsibilities. The South Korean Ministry of National Defense said that Kim Yo-jong's words and actions highlighted the North Korean government's system of being out of control, which led to the top government officials personally managing such trivial matters. It is also believed that "the use of South Korean photos was a statement made to cover up the fact that the military did not take photos or took the wrong photos".

== Other topics ==
=== Debate on South Korea's nuclear status ===
At a defense conference in 2023, South Korean President Yoon Suk Yeol said he was considering developing nuclear weapons and sought the support of U.S. President Joe Biden after the conference. After this incident, the Foreign Correspondents Club of the Korea Press Center held a press conference entitled "The Necessity and Possibility of South Korea's Nuclear Armament: Points of contention and challenges". Jeong Sang-chang, director of the Korean Peninsula Strategy Center at the Sejong Institute, pointed out that, given the current geopolitical situation in Northeast Asia, the South Korean government should accelerate the development of its own nuclear deterrent. He said that if South Korea achieves nuclear armament, Japan may follow suit, thus forming a regional nuclear balance. Afterwards, Cho Hyun-dong, the South Korean ambassador to the United States, said at a national audit in Washington that, on the premise that the South Korean government has no intention of developing its own nuclear armament and redeploying U.S. tactical nuclear weapons, the next U.S. government will persuade the United States to allow South Korea to have facilities for reprocessing used nuclear fuel after it takes office.
