= Pyongsan So clan =

Korean clan from Hwanghae Province

- Country: Korea
- Current region: Pyongsan County
- Founder: So Gwang bin

Pyongsan So clan (Korean: 평산 소씨; Hanja: 平山 邵氏) was one of the Korean clans. Their Bon-gwan was in Pyongsan County, Hwanghae Province. According to the research in 2000, the number of Pyongsan So clan was 725. Pyongsan So clan was one of the descendants of Duke of Shao’s family in Zhou dynasty. Their founder was So Gwang bin who was a government official in Gyeongsang Province, Goryeo, during Myeongjong of Goryeo’s reign.

== See also ==
- Korean clan names of foreign origin
