= Pyongsan station =

Railway station in North Korea

P'yŏngsan 평산

Korean name
- Hangul: 평산역
- Hanja: 平山驛
- Revised Romanization: Pyeongsan-yeok
- McCune–Reischauer: P'yŏngsan-yŏk

General information
- Location: P'yŏngsan-ŭp, P'yŏngsan County, North Hwanghae Province; North Korea
- Coordinates: 38.3324°N 126.3963°E
- Owner: Korean State Railway

History
- Opened: 20 December 1931
- Former names: Namch'ŏn
- Original company: Chosen Government Railway

Services
Preceding station	Korean State Railway	Following station
Mulgae towards P'yŏngyang	P'yŏngbu Line	Taebaeksansŏng towards Kaesŏng
Terminus	Ch'ŏngnyŏn Ich'ŏn Line	Kit'an towards Sep'o Ch'ŏngnyŏn
Location

P'yŏngsan station is a railway station located in P'yŏngsan-ŭp P'yŏngsan County, North Hwanghae province, North Korea. It serves as the junction point of two railway lines – the P'yŏngbu Line, which connects P'yŏngyang to Kaesŏng (and, formerly, Pusan, via Dorasan), and the Ch'ŏngnyŏn Ich'ŏn Line, which runs from P'yŏngsan to Sep'ŏ where it connects to the Kangwŏn Line.

== History ==
Originally called Namch'ŏn station, it was opened by the Chosen Government Railway on 20 December 1931.
