= Dora Observatory =

South Korean building on the 38th parallel

Coordinates: 37°54′33″N 126°42′21″E

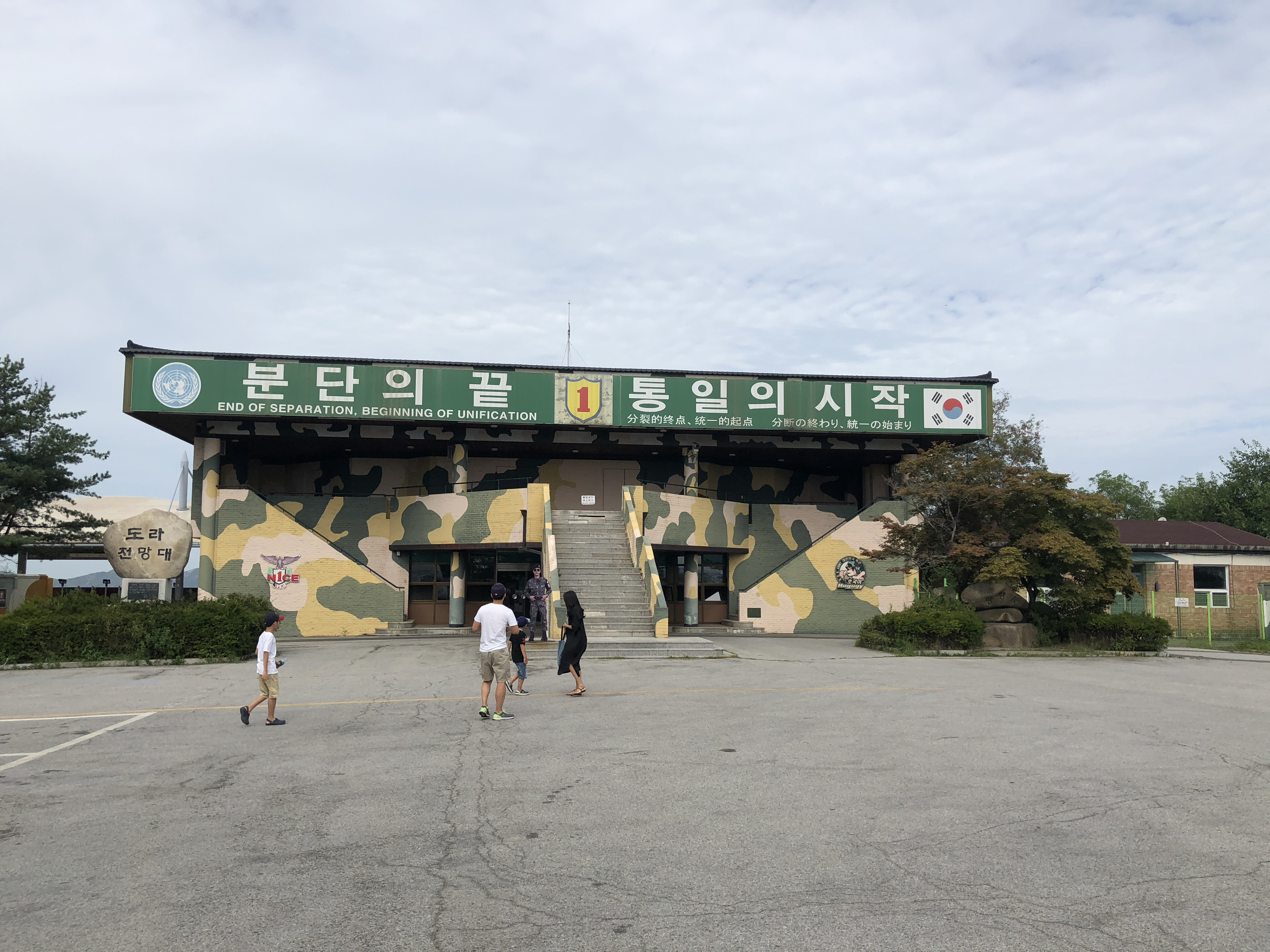
- Dora Observatory in 2018

Korean name
- Hangul: 도라전망대
- Hanja: 都羅展望臺
- RR: Dora jeonmangdae
- MR: Tora chŏnmangdae

Dora Observatory (Korean: 도라전망대) is on the South Korean side of the 38th parallel. Situated on top of Dorasan (Mount Dora) in Paju, the observatory provides scenic views across the Demilitarized Zone. Visitors can see the North Korean territory through binoculars from the 304 square feet, 500-person capacity observatory. They are able to see the North Korean propaganda village situated in the DMZ, and can also see the city of Kaesong. The observatory is very close to the Third North Korean Infiltration Tunnel dug by North Koreans into the South. The Dorasan Station, also nearby, is designed to be the station that connects the railroads of the South and North one day in the future.

In 2024 a new three-storey Dora Observatory building was opened with an indoor amphitheatre, cafe and toilets, with the original building de-commissioned and no longer accessible to tour groups.

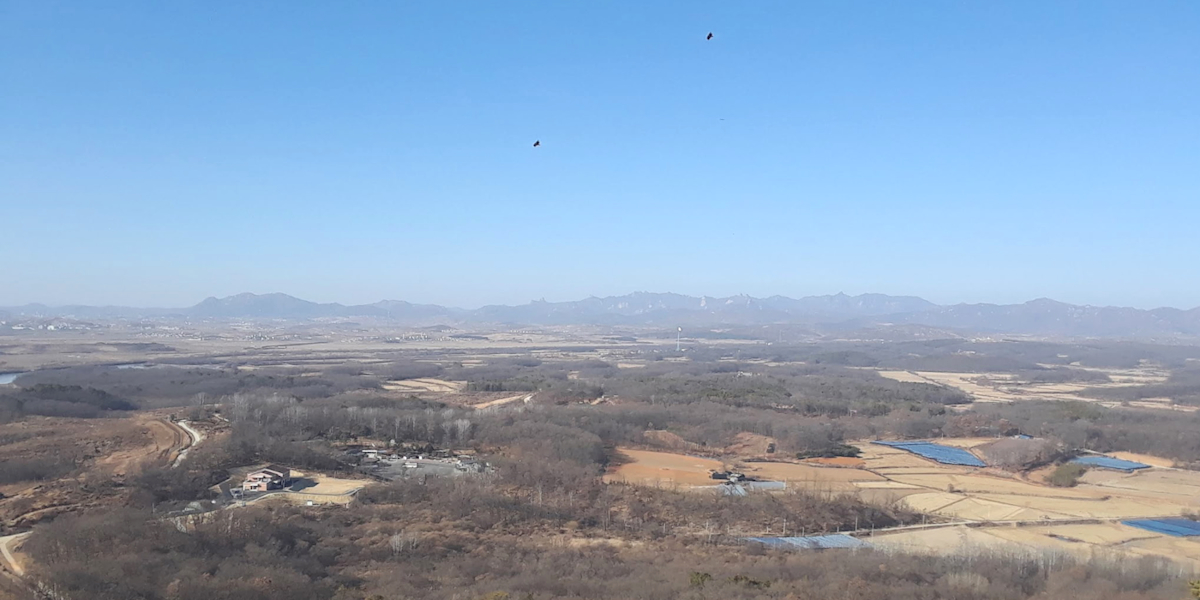
North Korea as viewed from the Dora Observatory in 2018

== See also ==
- Daeseong-dong
