= Kumchon County =

Coordinates: 38°09′40″N 126°28′34″E

Kŭmch'ŏn County 금천군
- County

Korean transcription(s)
  - Hanja: 金川郡
  - McCune-Reischauer: Kŭmch'ŏn-gun
  - Revised Romanization: Geumcheon-gun
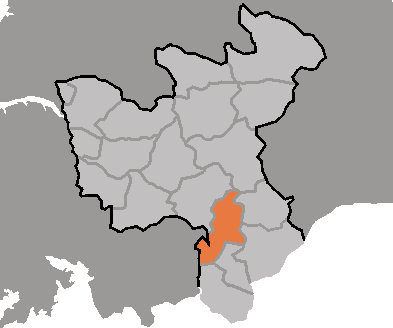
- Map of North Hwanghae showing the location of Kumchon
- Country: North Korea
- Province: North Hwanghae Province
- Administrative divisions: 1 ŭp, 14 ri

Population (2008)
  - Total: 68,216

Kŭmch'ŏn County is a county in the North Hwanghae province of North Korea. It has a population of 68,216.

== Geography ==
Kŭmch'ŏn is bordered to the west by Kaesŏng, to the south by Kaep'ung, to the northwest by T'osan, and to the north by Mt. Pakbong (562 m) and Sin'gye county. It is bordered to the east by the Ryesŏng River, P'yŏngsan, and Pongch'ŏn county (in South Hwanghae). According to preliminary results from the 2008 population census, it has a population of 3,255,388.

== Climate ==
Kŭmch'ŏn had a fairly severe climate, with an average temperature of 10.2 degrees. Inland, the average January temperature is -7 degrees, while the average August temperature is 25.6 degrees. The county receives an average of 1,100 mm of rain per year.

== Transportation ==
The county is served by the P'yongbu line of the Korean State Railway, which stops in at Kŭmch'ŏn station. There is also a highway which runs through Kŭmch'ŏn-ŭp.

== Industry ==
Agriculture is the main industry of Kŭmch'ŏn. Mainly rice but also several other products like beans, wheat, ginseng and tobacco are cultivated. Kŭmch'ŏn, like many other parts of northern Korea, is a resource-rich region. Some resources are for example asbestos, molybdenum, mercury, cinnabar, serpentine etc.

== Administrative divisions ==
The county is divided into one town (ŭp) and 14 villages (ri).

	Chosŏn'gŭl	Hancha
Kŭmch'ŏn-ŭp	금천읍	金川邑
Hyŏnnae-ri	현내리	峴內里
Kangbuk-ri	강북리	江北里
Kangnam-ri	강남리	江南里
Kyejŏng-ri	계정리	鷄井里
Munmyŏng-ri	문명리	文明里
Namjŏng-ri	남정리	南亭里
Paengma-ri	백마리	白馬里
Paek'yang-ri	백양리	白陽里
Ryanghap-ri	량합리	兩合里
Ryongsŏng-ri	룡성리	龍城里
Singang-ri	신강리	新江里
Tŏksal-li	덕산리	德山里
Wŏlam-ri	월암리	月岩里
Wŏnmyŏng-ri	원명리	圓明里

== See also ==
- Geography of North Korea
- Administrative divisions of North Korea
