= Imjingang station =

Commuter rail station near Paju, South Korea

임진강
Imjingang
임진강; Imjingang
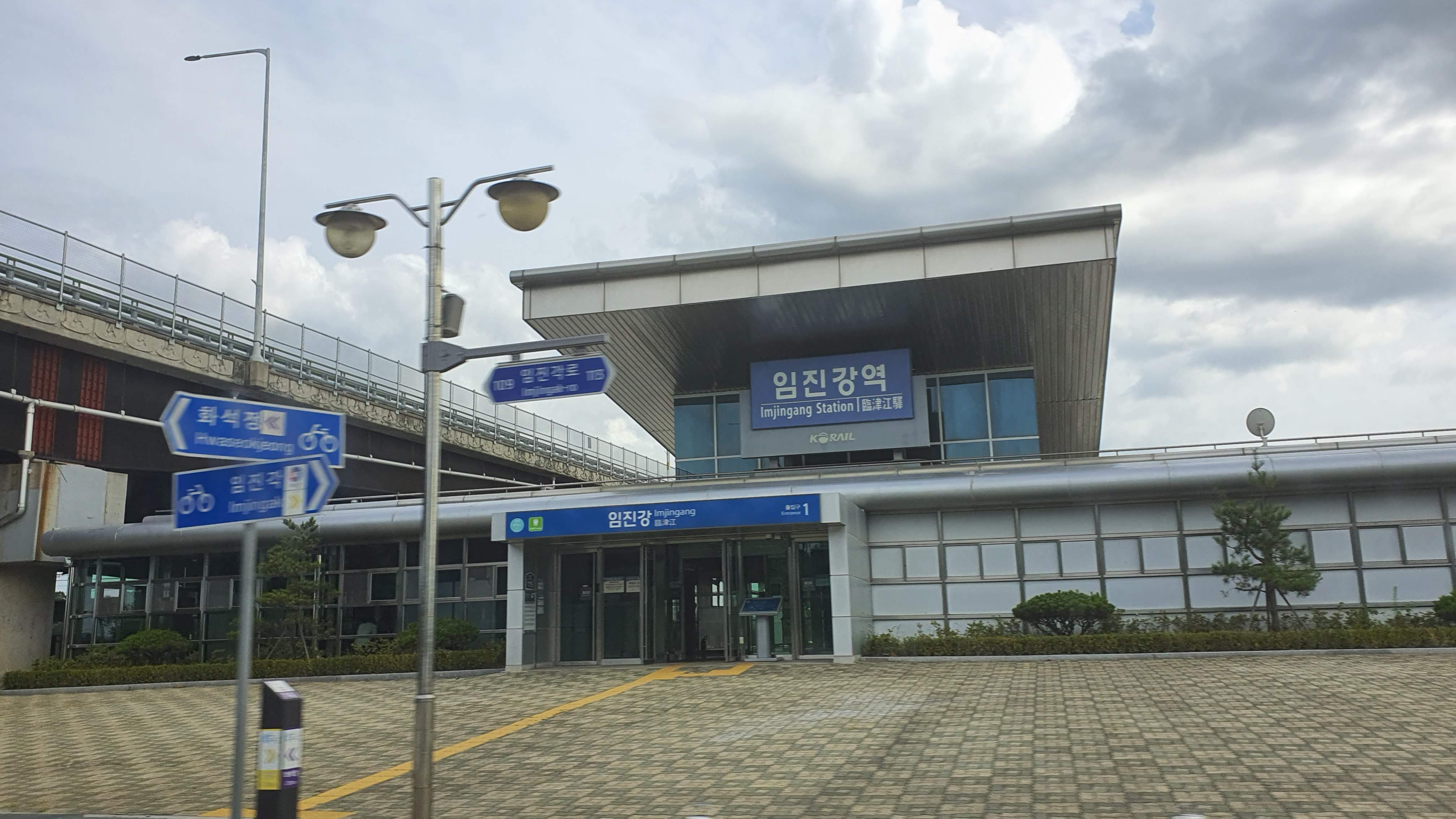

Korean name
- Hangul: 임진강역
- Hanja: 臨津江驛
- Revised Romanization: Imjingangnyeok
- McCune–Reischauer: Imjin'gangnyŏk

General information
- Location: Majeong-ri, Munsan-eup, Paju, Gyeonggi Province; South Korea
- Coordinates: 37°53′17.57″N 126°44′49.50″E
- Operator: Korail
- Line: Gyeongui–Jungang Line
- Platforms: 1 (1 side platform)
- Tracks: 1

Construction
- Structure type: Aboveground

History
- Opened: September 30, 2001
- Electrified: March 28, 2020

Key dates
- March 28, 2020: Gyeongui–Jungang Line Shuttle Service (Munsan - Imjingang) started
- December 11, 2021: Gyeongui–Jungang Line Shuttle Service (Imjingang - Dorasan) started
- February 12, 2022: Gyeongui–Jungang Line Shuttle Service (Imjingang - Dorasan) suspended
- August 9, 2024: Gyeongui–Jungang Line Shuttle Service (Imjingang - Dorasan) resumed
- April 10, 2026: Gyeongui–Jungang Line Shuttle Service (Imjingang - Dorasan) replaced by the DMZ Peace Link Train, now running to Seoul Station

Services
Preceding station	Seoul Metropolitan Subway	Following station
Terminus	Gyeongui–Jungang Line Munsan–Imjingang Shuttle Service	Uncheon towards Munsan
Preceding station	Korail	Following station
Unjeong towards Seoul	DMZ Peace Link Train	Dorasan Terminus
Location

Imjingang station (Korean: 임진강역) is a railway station on the Gyeongui–Jungang Line.

== Service history ==
Since its initial opening on September 30, 2001, the station was originally served by the Commuter Train that ran between Seoul and Dorasan. However, the Commuter Train services were later cut back to run between Munsan and Dorasan on July 1, 2009, before later being replaced entirely by the DMZ Train service, which was introduced on May 4, 2014.

Passengers on the DMZ Train who were travelling to Dorasan station were required to disembark at this station to present identification and documents before being allowed to continue their journeys, as Dorasan station is located within the Civilian Control Zone.

On October 2, 2019, the DMZ Train halted operations due to concerns about the spread of an outbreak of African swine fever in South Korea.; as such, the station effectively received no trains from that date until March 28, 2020, when the Gyeongui–Jungang Line was extended to the station and a new 3.7 km shuttle service between Munsan and this station began operations.

On December 11, 2021, another new 3.7 km shuttle service between Imjingang station and Dorasan station began operations. This service operates only once during weekends and public holidays. People who are travelling to Dorasan station are required to disembark at this station to present identification and documents before being allowed to continue their journeys, as Dorasan station is located within the Civilian Control Zone. This was suspended in 2022, before resuming in 2024. This service was replaced by the DMZ Peace Link Train, now running to Seoul Station, on April 10, 2026.
