= Korean Veterans Association =

Korean Veterans association(대한민국 재향군인회) is the organization of military veterans of the Republic of Korea (South Korea). In 2012, they called for a redeployment of military weapons in South Korea to counter deployments in North Korea. The Chairman of Korean Veterans is Park Seh-jik as of 2012.

== History ==
The association was founded in Busan on February 1, 1952, as an institution to assist the South Korean defense ministry, with 30,000 discharged South Korean soldiers as members.

== American division ==
Pastor Hae Soung Kim, Th.D, is the president of Korean Veterans of America, the American chapter of Korean Veterans.

== See also ==
- Korea Retired Generals and Admirals Association
