= Third Tunnel of Aggression =

Tunnel from North Korea to South Korea

Coordinates: 37°54′59″N 126°41′55″E

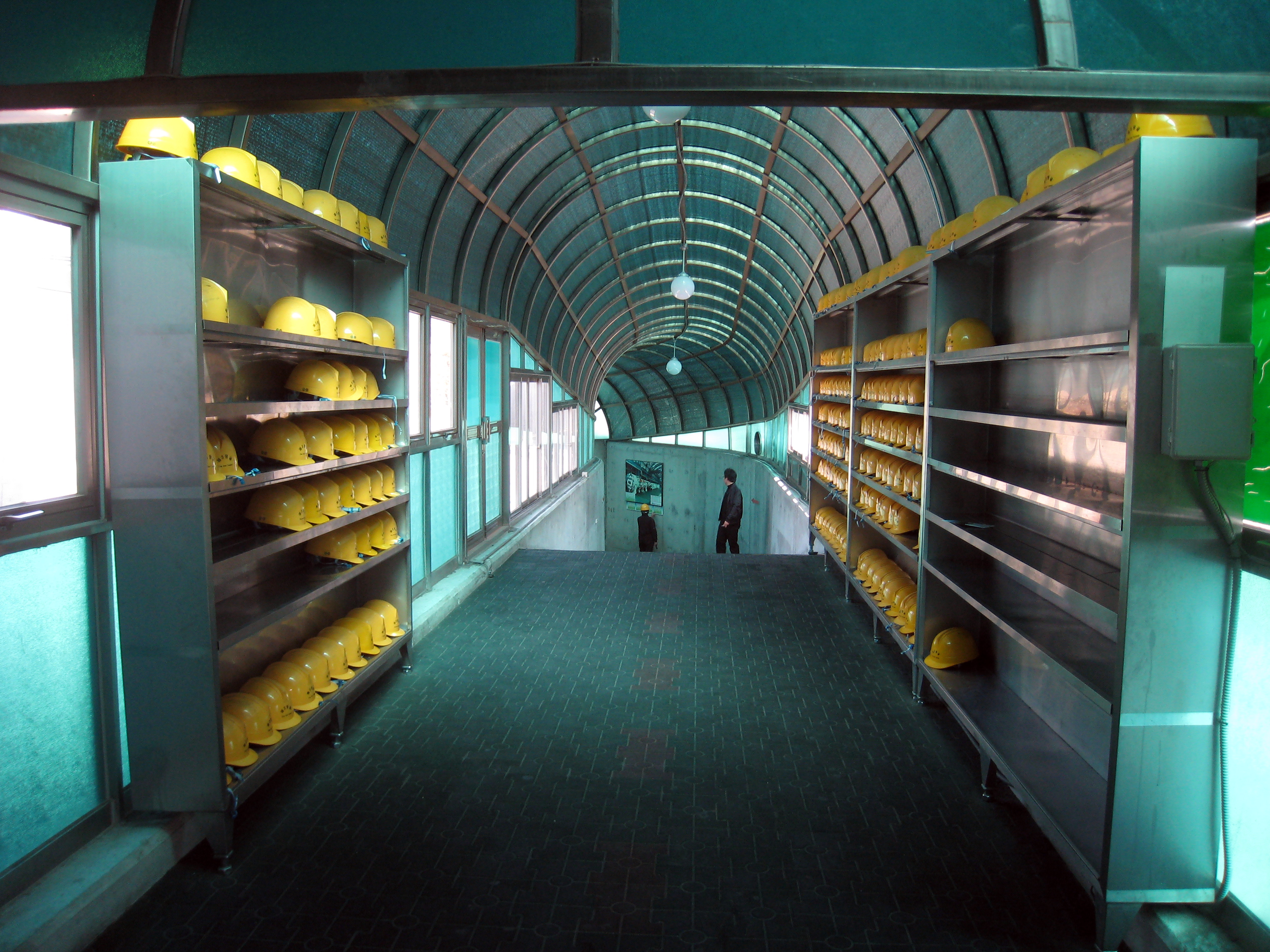

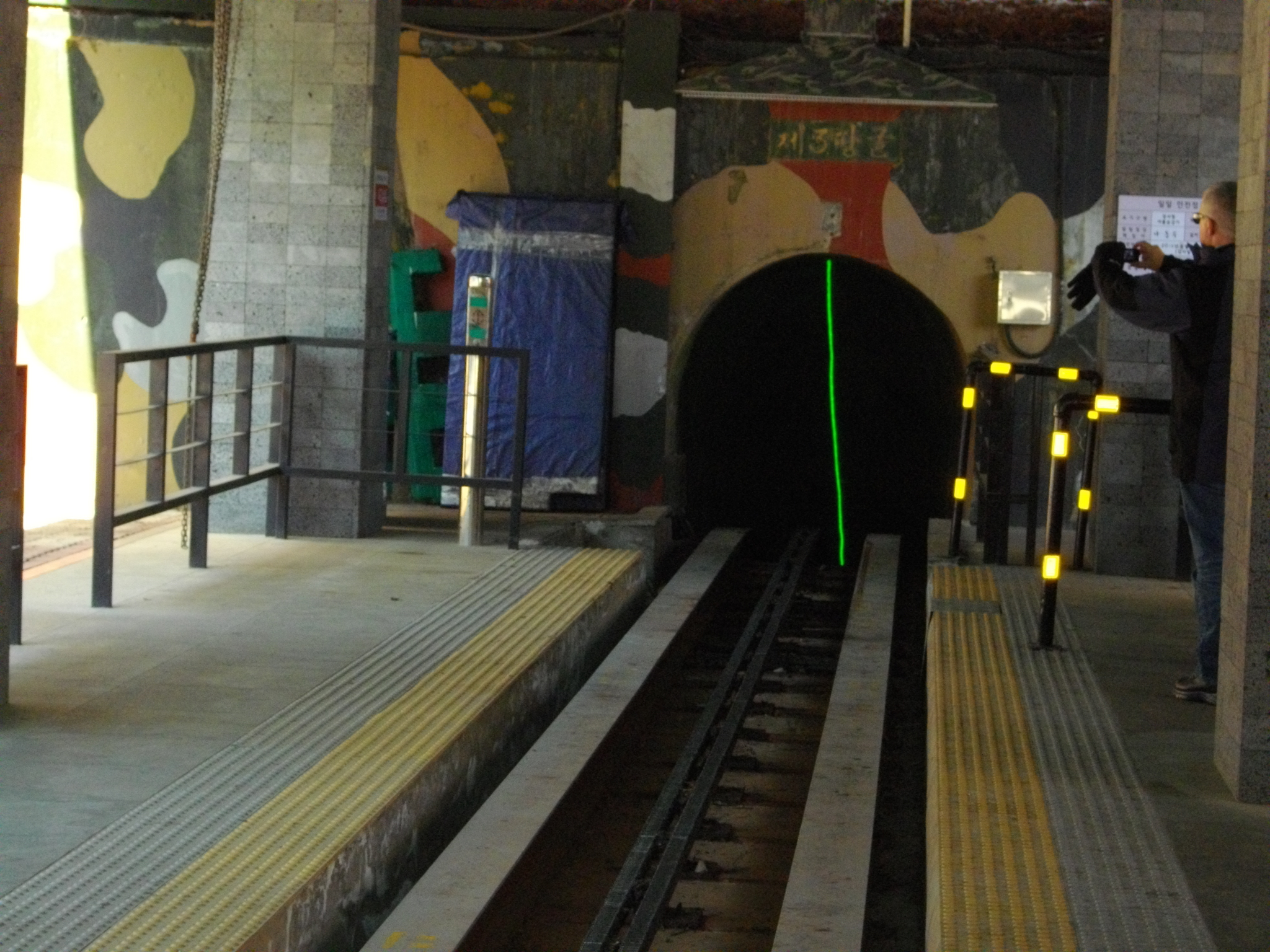
Entrance to the visitor access tunnel

The Third Tunnel of Aggression (Korean: 제3땅굴; Third Infiltration Tunnel or 3rd Tunnel) is one of four known tunnels under the border between North Korea and South Korea, extending south of Panmunjom.

== Background ==
Aggression tunnels on the Koreas border

Only 44 km (27 miles) from Seoul, the incomplete tunnel was discovered in October 1978 following the detection of an underground explosion in June 1978, apparently caused by the tunnellers who had progressed 435 metres (1,427 feet) under the south side of the Korean Demilitarized Zone (DMZ). It took four months to locate the tunnel precisely and dig an intercept tunnel.

The incomplete tunnel is 1,635 metres (1.0 mile) long, 1.95 m (6 ft 5 in) at its maximum height and 2.1 m (6 ft 11 in) wide. It runs through bedrock at a depth of about 73 m (240 ft) below ground. It was apparently designed for a surprise attack on Seoul from North Korea, and could, according to visitor information in the tunnel, accommodate 30,000 men per hour along with light weaponry. Upon discovery of the third tunnel, the United Nations Command accused North Korea of threatening the 1953 Korean Armistice Agreement signed at the end of the Korean War. Its description as a "tunnel of aggression" was given by South Korea, who considered it an act of aggression on the part of North Korea.

Initially, North Korea denied building the tunnel. North Korea then declared it part of a coal mine, the tunnel having been blackened by construction explosions. Signs in the tunnel claim that there is no geological likelihood of coal being in the area. The walls of the tunnel where tourists are taken are observably granite, a stone of igneous origin, whereas coal would be found in stone of sedimentary origin.

A total of four tunnels have been discovered so far, but there are believed to be up to twenty more. The South Korean Armed Forces still devotes specialist resources to finding infiltration tunnels, though tunnels are much less significant now that North Korean long-range artillery and missiles have become more effective.

== Tourist site ==
The tunnel is now a tourist site, though still well guarded.

Visitors enter either by walking down a long steep incline that starts in a lobby with a gift shop or via a rubber-tyred train that contains a driver at the front or the back (depending on the direction as there is only one set of rails) and padded seats facing forward and backwards in rows for up to three passengers each. Photography is forbidden within the tunnel. The South Koreans have blocked the actual Military Demarcation Line in the tunnel with three concrete barricades. Tourists can walk as far as the third barricade, and the second barricade is visible through a small window in the third.

== See also ==
- Korean People's Army
- List of tunnels in North Korea
