= Dorasan =

Hill in Paju, South Korea

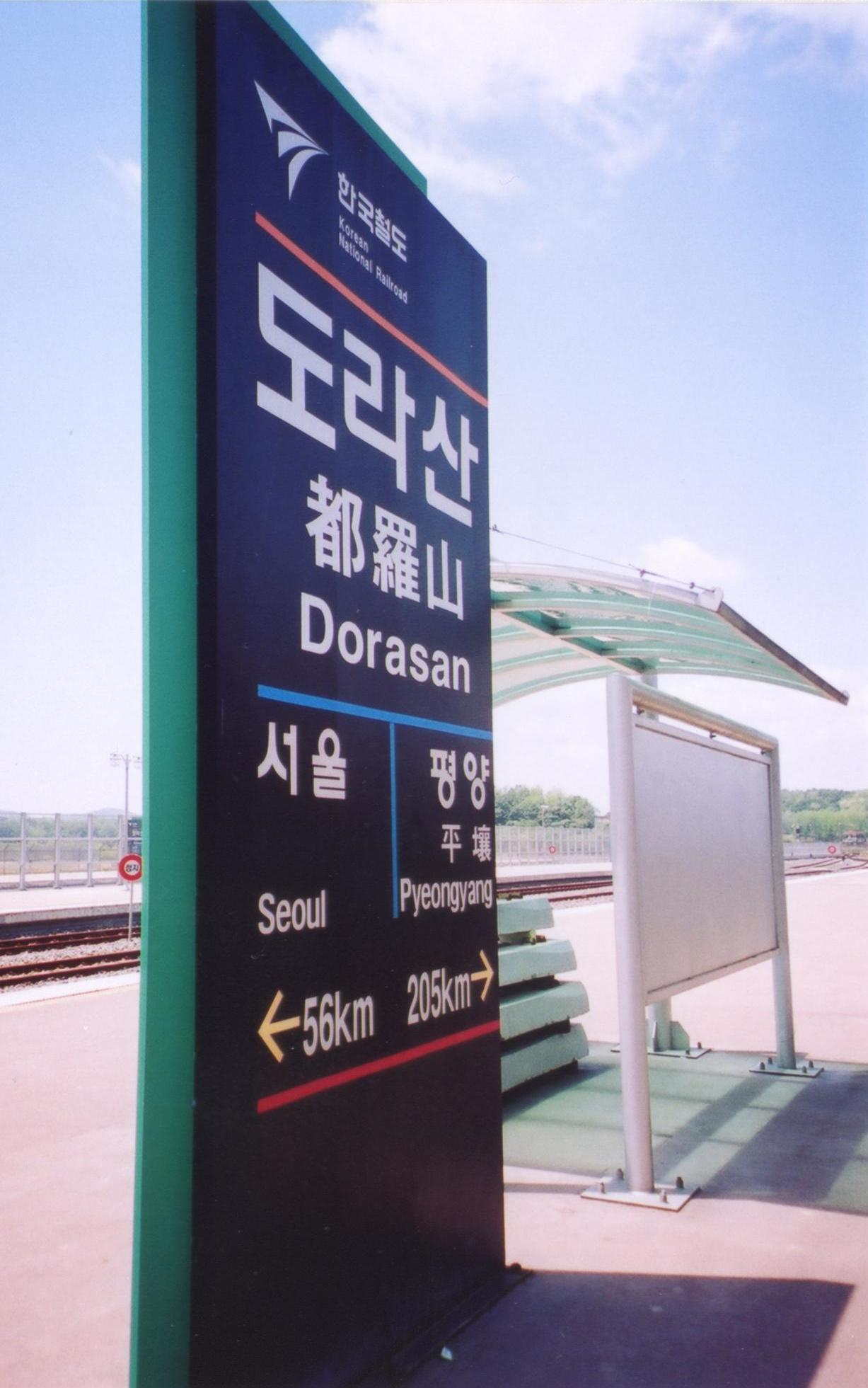
- Platform at Dorasan Station with sign displaying distance to Seoul and Pyeongyang

Highest point
- Coordinates: 37°54′01″N 126°41′12″E

Geography

Korean name
- Hangul: 도라산
- Hanja: 都羅山
- RR: Dorasan
- MR: Torasan

Dorasan (Korean: 도라산) or Mount Dora is a 156-metre (512 ft) hill on the north bank of the Imjin River in northernmost Paju, South Korea. It lies very near the Korean Demilitarized Zone. The hill gives its name to several nearby landmarks, including Dorasan Station and the Mt. Dora Observatory, as well as to the local administrative unit Dorasan-ri.

== Overview ==
The hill's name can be translated as "Silla City Mountain." According to legend, the last king of Silla, King Gyeongsun, dwelt nearby after he gave up his throne to Taejo of Goryeo. Unable to return to Silla, King Gyeongsun would walk to the top of Dorasan and weep for his home in Gyeongju. Due to this historical significance, "Dorasan" was chosen as the name of the train station.

== See also ==
- Dorasan Station
- Division of Korea
- List of mountains in Korea
