= Pyongsan County =

P‘yŏngsan County 평산군
- County

Korean transcription(s)
  - Hanja: 平山郡
  - McCune-Reischauer: P‘yŏngsan-kun
  - Revised Romanization: Pyongsan-gun
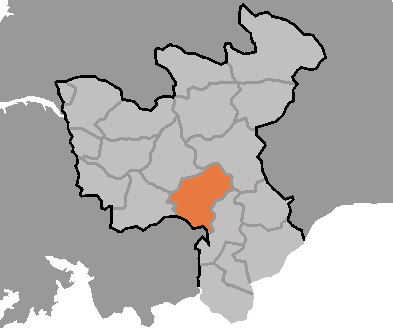
- Map of North Hwanghae showing the location of Pyongsan
- Country: North Korea
- Province: North Hwanghae

Area
  - Total: 538.6 km^{2} (208.0 sq mi)

Population (2008)
  - Total: 123,646
  - Density: 229.6/km^{2} (594.6/sq mi)

P‘yŏngsan County is a county in North Hwanghae Province, North Korea.

== Etymology ==
During the Japanese occupation of Korea, the county was called Heizan (Japanese: 平山) and was a part of the now-defunct Kokai Province.

== Administrative divisions ==
P'yŏngsan county is divided into 1 ŭp (town), 2 rodongjagu (workers' districts) and 20 ri (villages):

- P'yŏngsan-ŭp
- Ch'ŏnhang-rodongjagu
- P'yŏnghwa-rodongjagu
- Chup'yo-ri
- Ch'ŏngsu-ri
- Haewŏl-li
- Hanp'o-ri
- Kit'al-li
- Okch'ŏl-li
- Pongch'ŏl-li
- Pongt'al-li
- Pusu-ri
- Rimsal-li
- Ryesŏng-ri
- Ryonggung-ri
- Samch'ŏl-li
- Samryong-ri
- Sang'am-ri
- Sansŏng-ri
- Sansu-ri
- T'an'gyo-ri
- Wahyŏl-li
- Wŏlch'ŏl-li

== History ==
Pyongsan County was called Pyeongju (Korean: 평주; Hanja: 平州) during the Goryeo period. 4 warlords were from Pyeongju during the Later Three Kingdoms period. Yu Geumpil, who greatly contributed to the unification of the Later Three Kingdoms, was from Pyeongju. Wang Geon married 3 women from Pyeongju.

== Industry ==
=== Uranium mine and milling plant ===
Pyongsan is home to one of two declared uranium milling plants within North Korea. The plant processes coal from a nearby mine to concentrate the uranium found in the coal into yellowcake. The plant was declared to the international community in 1992. Estimates place the plant's annual uranium production capacity at 300 tons.

Reporting by a US-based researcher in August 2019 showed that the plant was leaking waste materials, leading to health concerns over those that live near the plant and fears that the pollution would travel down the Ryesong river to South Korean waters. The leaks were independently verified by 38 North. On 28 August 2019, the South Korean Ministry of Unification announced that testing of a portion of the Han River along the Northern Limit Line was underway to determine the level of pollution and if any substantial radiation risk existed.

=== Nuclear Waste Dump ===
In 2013 the North Korean Central Government and Taipower began negotiations about shipping nuclear waste to P‘yŏngsan. The deal was "worth US$75.66 million envisaged shipping 60,000 barrels of nuclear waste, and a further 14,000 barrels in the second stage, with a total value of $150 million and that the North Koreans were after the deal as a source of foreign exchange" but has run into difficulty when Taipower could not get an "export permit for the waste from the Taiwanese Atomic Energy Council". According to Huang Tien-huang, a Taipower official, North Korea blocked Taipower from viewing the processing site at P‘yŏngsan. Due to several issues, the final contract was not signed. However, North Korea (through its attorney, Tsai Hui-ling) is suing Taipower for breach of contract.

== Transport ==
P‘yŏngsan county is served by the following stations of the Korean State Railway:

- P‘yŏngsan Station, P'yŏngbu and Ch'ŏngnyŏn Ich'ŏn lines;
- Mulgae Station, P'yŏngbu Line
- Taebaeksansŏng Station, P'yŏngbu Line
- Kyejŏng Station, P'yŏngbu Line

== Notable people ==
- Jo Young-nam, South Korean singer
- Nelson Shin, animator, director and producer
- Syngman Rhee, the first president of South Korea
