= Gyeongui Line =

Railway line in South Korea

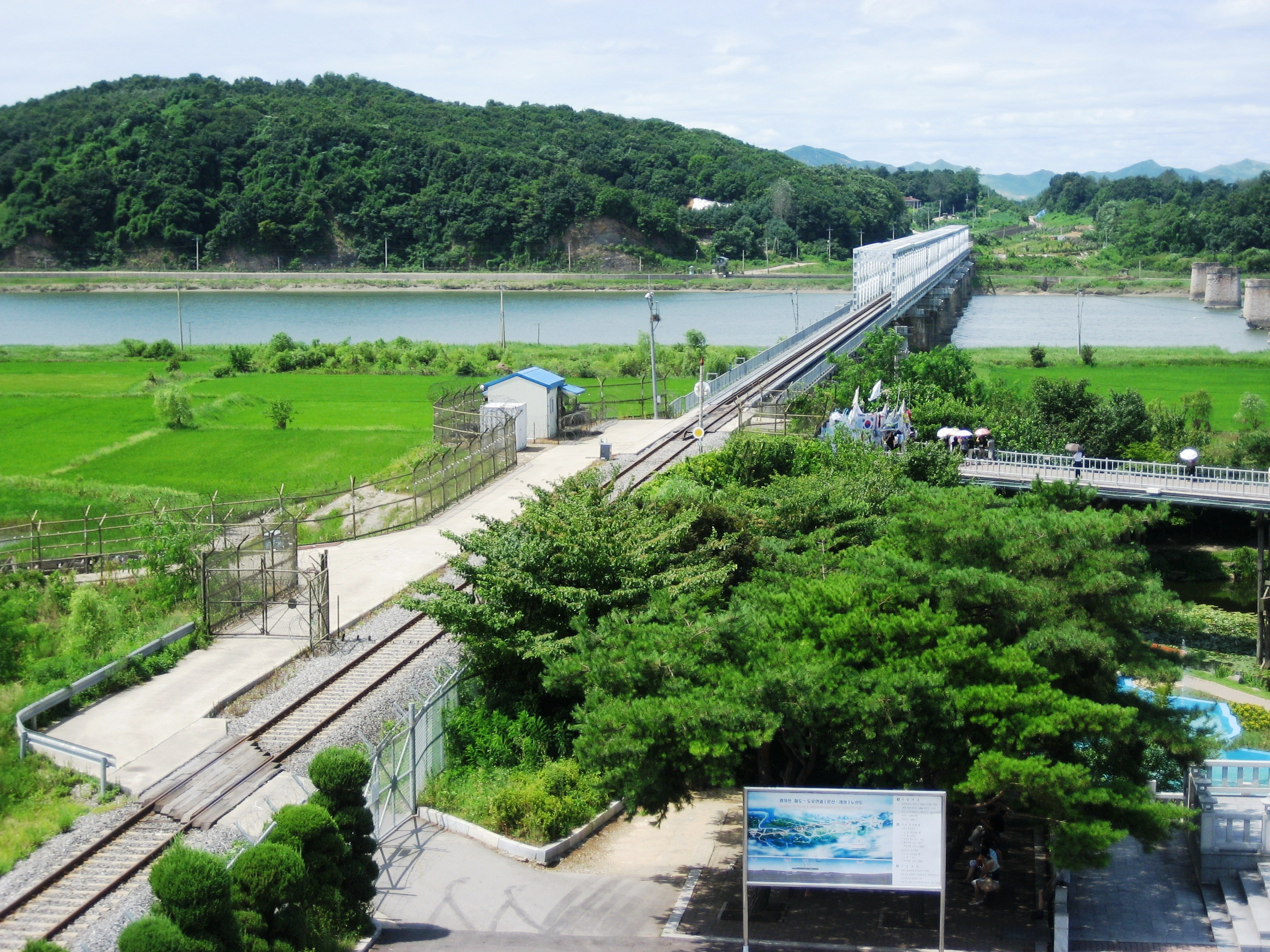
- The Gyeongui Line crossing the Imjin River in 2006

Overview
- Native name: 경의선 (京義線)
- Owner: Korea Rail Network Authority
- Locale: Seoul; Goyang; Paju
- Termini: Seoul; Dorasan
- Stations: 23

Service
- Type: Heavy rail, passenger/freight regional rail
- Operator: Korail
- Depot(s): Munsan, Goyang

History
- Opened: April 28, 1905 (actual opening); April 3, 1906 (passenger service); July 1, 2009 (Seoul Metropolitan Subway service)

Technical
- Line length: 56.1 km (34.9 mi)
- Num of tracks: Double track (Seoul–Munsan); Single track
- Track gauge: 1,435 mm (4 ft 8 1/2 in) standard gauge
- Electrification: 25 kV/60 Hz AC catenary
Route map
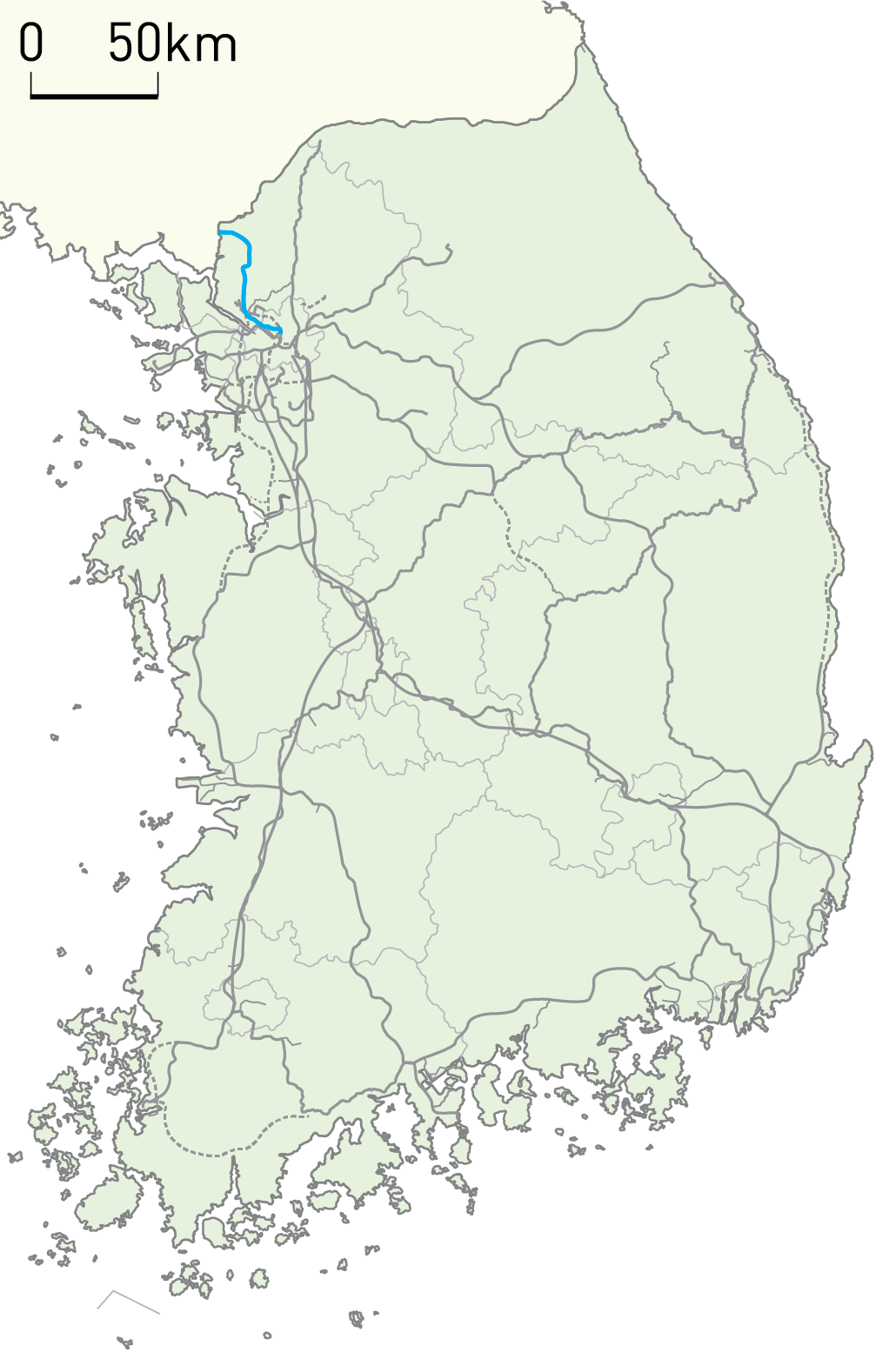

- Gyeongui Line
- Hangul: 경의선
- Hanja: 京義線
- RR: Gyeonguiseon
- MR: Kyŏngŭisŏn

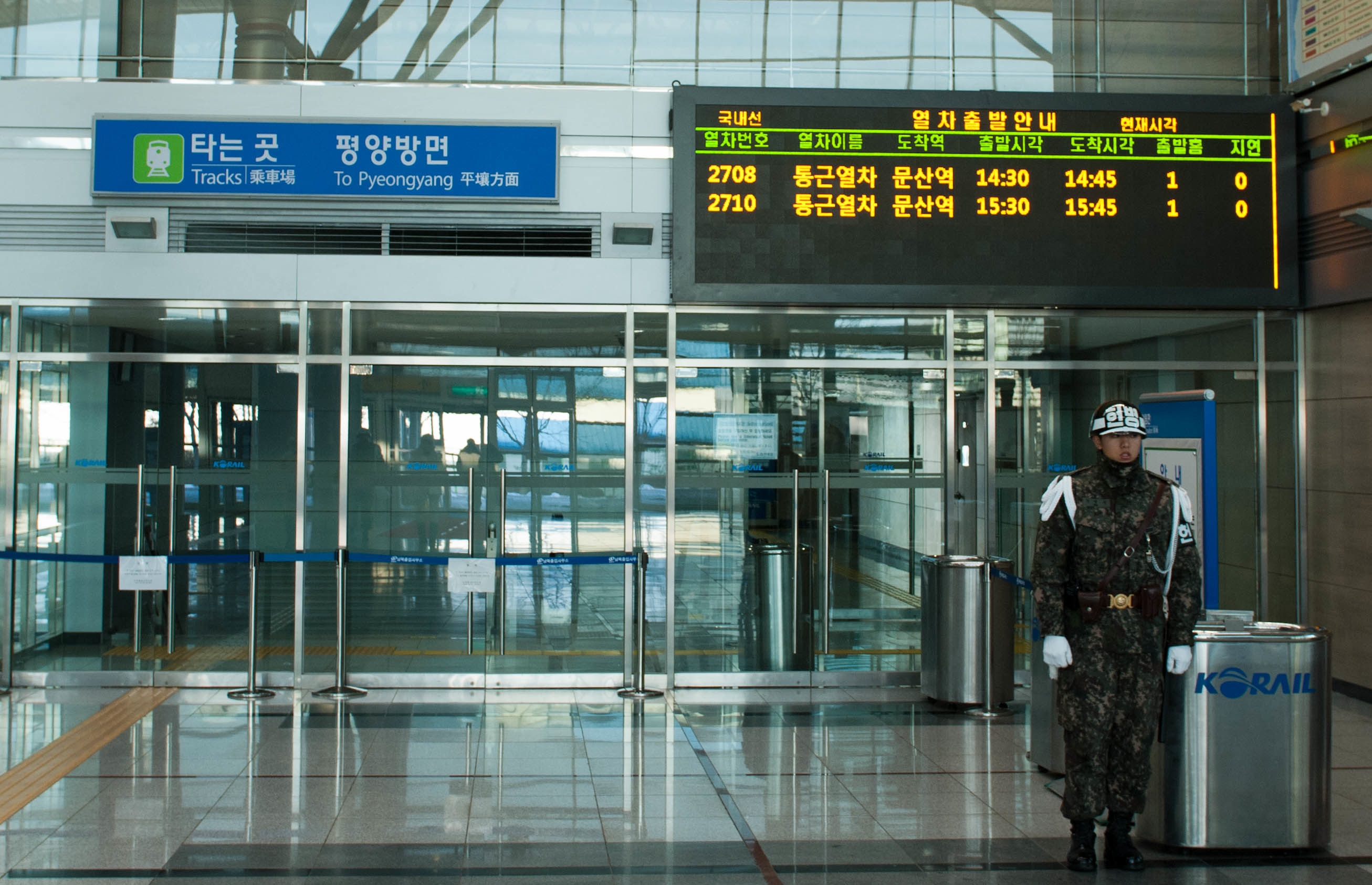
Dorasan Station

The Gyeongui Line is a railway line between Seoul and Dorasan in Paju. Korail operates the Seoul Metropolitan Subway service between Seoul Station and Imjingang.

== History ==
For the original line's history and other information prior to 1945, see Gyeongui Line (1904–1945).

Originally the line continued to P'yŏngyang and Sinŭiju, where it connected to the South Manchuria Railway, linking the Korean railway system to the rest of Asia and Europe.

The Korean Empire intended to build the Gyeongui Line itself at the end of the 19th century, but a shortage of funding resulted in the project's suspension. The Empire of Japan, which gained a concession to build the Gyeongbu Line from Busan to Seoul, also sought to gain control of the Gyeongui Line project as its continuation further north, recognizing the trunk route as a means to keep Korea under its influence. The line was also advanced for military considerations in expectation of a confrontation with Russia, which came in 1904 as the Russo-Japanese War. At the start of the war, Japan ignored Korea's declaration of neutrality and transported troops to Incheon, and forced the Korean government to sign an agreement that gave Japan's military control of railway projects if deemed necessary for military operations. Japan's military began to build the Gyeongui Line, while troop bases were established in connection with the railway, the biggest of them next to the terminus of the line, Yongsan Station in Seoul.

Freight service on the entirety of the Gyeongui Line was started on April 3, 1906.

=== Inter-Korea border ===
After the division of Korea in 1945, trains stopped operating between the north and south halves of the country, meaning that southern trains probably terminated at Kaesŏng, which is now in North Korea but was at the time part of the US-administered southern zone. Northern trains would have terminated north of Kaesŏng.

After the end of the Korean War in 1953, southern trains were cut back to around Munsan (north of Seoul), with northern trains terminating at Kaesŏng. Around the same time, North Korea renamed the P'yŏngyang-Kaesŏng section of the line as the P'yŏngbu (P'yŏngyang + Busan) Line and the P'yŏngyang-Sinŭiju section as the P'yŏngŭi (P'yŏngyang + Sinŭiju) Line. The DPRK sector is now 100% electrified, although the double track section spans only from Pyongyang to Sunan Airport.

Since the summit between the two Koreas in 2000, an effort has slowly been underway to reconnect the Gyeongui Line. Southern passenger service has been extended to Dorasan on the edge of the Demilitarized Zone (DMZ) and tracks have been built across the DMZ itself. In October 2004, the Northern connection from the DMZ to Kaesŏng was finally completed. Simultaneous test runs along the rebuilt cross-border sections of both the Gyeongui Line and the Donghae Bukbu Line were set for May 25, 2006, but North Korean military authorities cancelled the plans a day ahead of the scheduled event. However, at a meeting held in Pyongyang, North Korea, on April 22, 2007, North and South Korea agreed to restart the project. On May 17, 2007, the first train, carrying North and South Korean delegations, travelled from Munsan Station in the South to Kaesong in the North. The first test run on the Donghae Bukbu Line took place at the same time. According to South Korean representatives, the North has agreed in principle to regular passenger and freight service along the two train lines. On 30 November 2018 an engineers' inspection train from South Korea crossed the border at Dorasan for an assessment, conducted jointly with North Korean officials, of the North's Kaesong to Sinuiju (P'yŏngŭi) line, and rail routes northwards from Mount Kumgang.

=== Upgrade ===
Meanwhile, work began to upgrade the South Korean section for high-capacity commuter services. Between Seoul and Munsan, the line is converted into an electrified, double-tracked railway in a new, straighter, 48.6 km long alignment. Work began in November 1999, with a budget originally estimated at 1,970 billion won. The section from Digital Media City (DMC) to Munsan was finished on July 1, 2009. The remaining section will be mostly underground between Gajwa Station in northwestern Seoul to Yongsan Station in downtown Seoul. As of 2009, construction progress on the entire Seoul–Munsan section reached 74% of a total budget then estimated at 2,153.271 billion won. The section is to be finished by 2014 and the freed area on the surface was reconstructed into a park known as the Gyeongui Line Forest Park.

The line is to be further upgraded for 230 kilometres per hour (140 mph), as part of a government strategic plan to reduce travel times for 95% of Korea to under 2 hours by 2020, which was announced on September 1, 2010.

The Gyeongui–Jungang Line (Munsan–Imjingang) extension opened on March 28, 2020.

== Services ==
=== Seoul Metropolitan Subway ===
The Gyeongui Line opened as a part Seoul Metropolitan Subway on July 1, 2009 from Seoul to Munsan. The line connects Seoul, Digital Media City, Ilsan, Paju, and Munsan, and offers transfers to Line 3, Line 6, and AREX.

The main line terminated at Digital Media City when first opened, while a separate branch continued to Seoul Station. On December 15, 2012, the main line was extended to Gongdeok, providing transfers to Line 2 and Line 5. On December 27, 2014, the main line service was further extended to Yongsan from Gongdeok, and the service was renamed to the Gyeongui–Jungang Line following the merging of the line with the Jungang Line.

The term "subway" in reference to this line is somewhat of a misnomer, as the line runs underground for less than three percent of its length. The upgraded line simply follows alignment of the old line built 100 years ago. The outer portion of the line runs largely through countryside rice paddies, forests, and vegetable fields, and outside of Seoul rarely enters urbanized areas. It is mostly at-grade, and includes several at-grade crossings with local roads, where Korail employees stand by on duty to stop traffic.

=== Regular rail service ===
Before the integration with the subway system, the most common service on the line was a Commuter Train train service between Seoul and Imjingang, with one Saemaeul-ho train. Since the line was integrated with the Seoul Subway system, Tonggeun service had been restricted to a few stations in the north, from Munsan to Imjingang, with a few continuing on to Dorasan, near the North Korean border.

=== KTX ===
There is a depot for KTX trains along the Gyeongui Line at Haengsin station. Some KTX services thus continue beyond Seoul respective Yongsan Station and terminate at Haengsin station.

The line may see more KTX service after the upgrade for 230 km/h considered in the government's strategic plan for 2020.

=== DMZ Peace Link Train ===
On April 10, 2026, the Gyeongui–Jungang Line shuttle service between Imjingang and Dorasan was replaced by the DMZ Peace Link Train, bringing regular tourist services back to Dorasan for the first time since 2019.

== Stations ==
This list does not include stations served only by Gyeongui-Jungang Line services.

Station number (Seoul Subway)	Station	Hangul	Hanja	Services
P313	Seoul	서울		Seoul Metropolitan Subway: Gyeongbu HSR; Gyeongbu ITX-Saemaeul services Mugunghwa-ho services DMZ Peace Link Train
K320	Haengsin	행신	幸信	Gyeongbu HSR; Honam HSR; Gyeongbu Honam; Gyeongjeon Jeolla
K329	Unjeong	운정	雲井	DMZ Peace Link Train; Gyeongui–Jungang Line
K335	Munsan	문산	汶山	Gyeongui–Jungang Line
K336	Uncheon	운천	雲泉	Gyeongui–Jungang Line
K337	Imjingang	임진강	臨津江	DMZ Peace Link Train; Gyeongui–Jungang Line
	Dorasan	도라산	都羅山	DMZ Peace Link Train

== See also ==
- Korail
- Gyeongui–Jungang Line
- Seoul Metropolitan Subway
- Pyongui Line
- Pyongbu Line
- Transportation in North Korea
- Transportation in South Korea
