= Dorasan station =

Railway station in South Korea

도라산
Dorasan
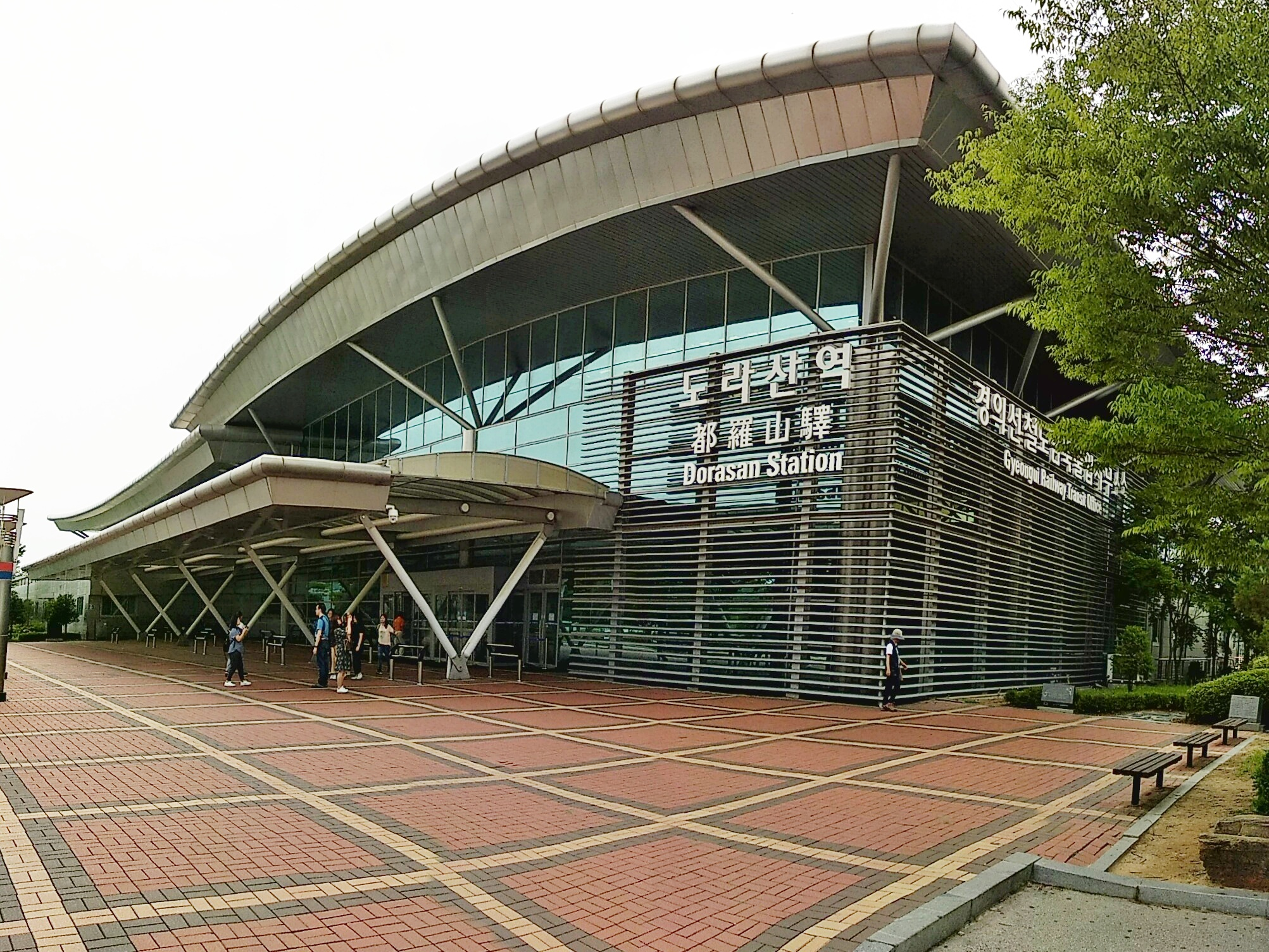

Korean name
- Hangul: 도라산역
- Hanja: 都羅山驛
- Revised Romanization: Dorasannyeok
- McCune–Reischauer: Torasannyŏk

General information
- Location: Nosang-ri, Jangdan-myeon, Paju, Gyeonggi Province; South Korea
- Coordinates: 37.898715°N 126.710075°E
- Operator: Korail
- Line: Gyeongui Line
- Platforms: 2 (2 side platforms) (1 not in use)
- Tracks: 2 (1 not in use)

Construction
- Structure type: Surface

History
- Opened: April 11, 2002 (Southern tracks), December 11, 2007 (Northern tracks)
- Electrified: December 11, 2021

Key dates
- December 11, 2021: Gyeongui–Jungang Line Shuttle Service (Imjingang - Dorasan) started
- February 12, 2022: Gyeongui–Jungang Line Shuttle Service (Imjingang - Dorasan) suspended
- August 9, 2024: Gyeongui–Jungang Line Shuttle Service (Imjingang - Dorasan) resumed
- April 10, 2026: Gyeongui–Jungang Line Shuttle Service (Imjingang - Dorasan) replaced with DMZ Peace Train

Services
Location

Dorasan station (Korean: 도라산역) is a railway station situated on the Gyeongui Line, which formerly connected North Korean and South Korean rail systems and has since been restored. Dorasan station is located approximately 650 meters (710 yards) from the southern boundary of the Korean Demilitarized Zone and is currently the northern terminus of the DMZ Peace Link Train from Seoul. North of here the former Gyeongui Line continued as the Korean State Railway's P'yŏngbu Line, but this connection was not in regular service, and will not re-enter service as North Korea blew up the railroad tracks just north of the demarcation line in 2024. The current purpose of the station is largely symbolic of the hope for eventual Korean reunification.

== History ==
Dorasan Station was inaugurated on April 11, 2002 by South Korean President Kim Dae-jung and his American counterpart George W. Bush.

The first passenger test-train ran between Dorasan and Kaesong on May 17, 2007, but no regular cross-border passenger service was ever established thereafter. On December 11, 2007, freight trains began traveling north past Dorasan station into North Korea, taking materials to the Kaesong Industrial Region, and returning with finished goods. It was scheduled to make one 16-kilometer (9.9 mi) trip every weekday.

On December 1, 2008, however, the North Korean government closed the border crossing after accusing South Korea of a confrontational policy. This coincided with the 2008 South Korean legislative election, and a change to a more conservative government. After that it was opened and closed again repeatedly. Finally, in 2024, North Korea blew up the railroad tracks just north of the demarcation line.

On December 11, 2021, a new shuttle service connecting Imjingang and this station was introduced. This was suspended in 2022, before being reinstated on August 9, 2024. It was replaced by the DMZ Peace Link Train on April 10, 2026.

== Train services ==
On April 10, 2026, Korail resumed tourist service to Dorasan station, which had been suspended since 2019 due to low demand, with support from South Korea’s Ministry of Unification and the city of Paju. A tourist train, called the “DMZ Peace Link Train,” runs from Seoul Station to Dorasan every other Friday as part of an organized tour. There are plans to increase service to one train per week during the summer peak season.

== Gallery ==
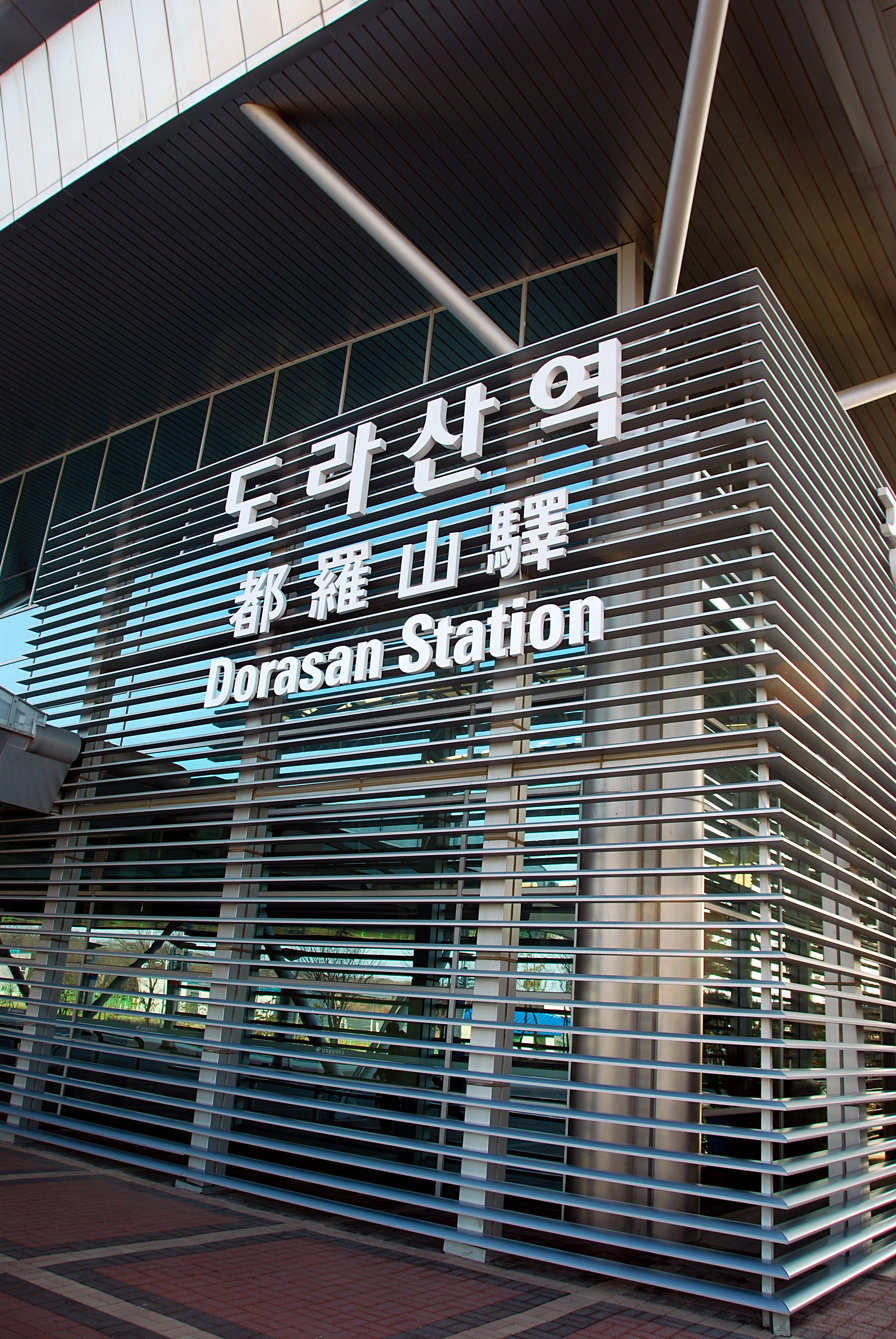
Outside Dorasan station

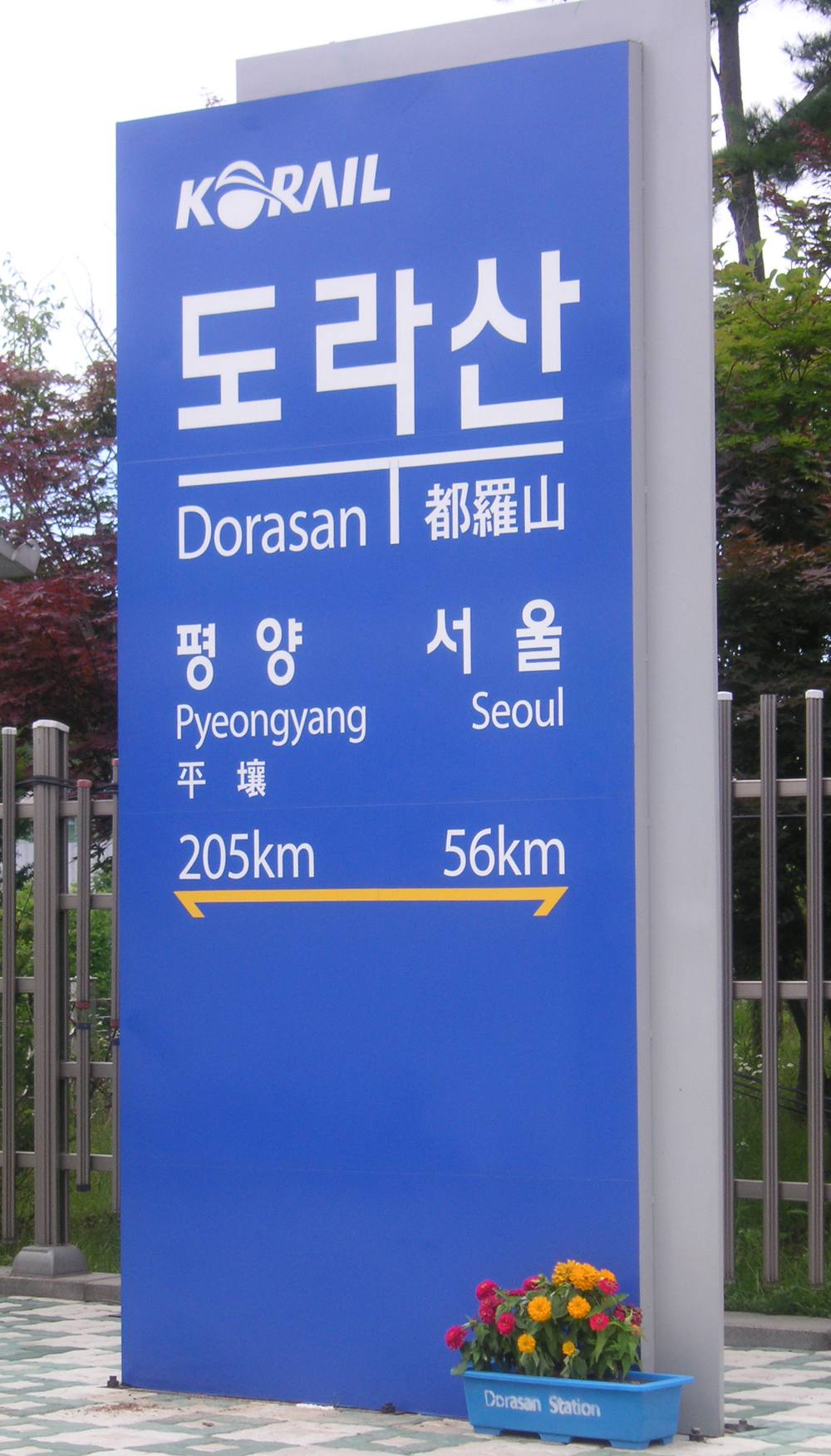
Dorasan station marker

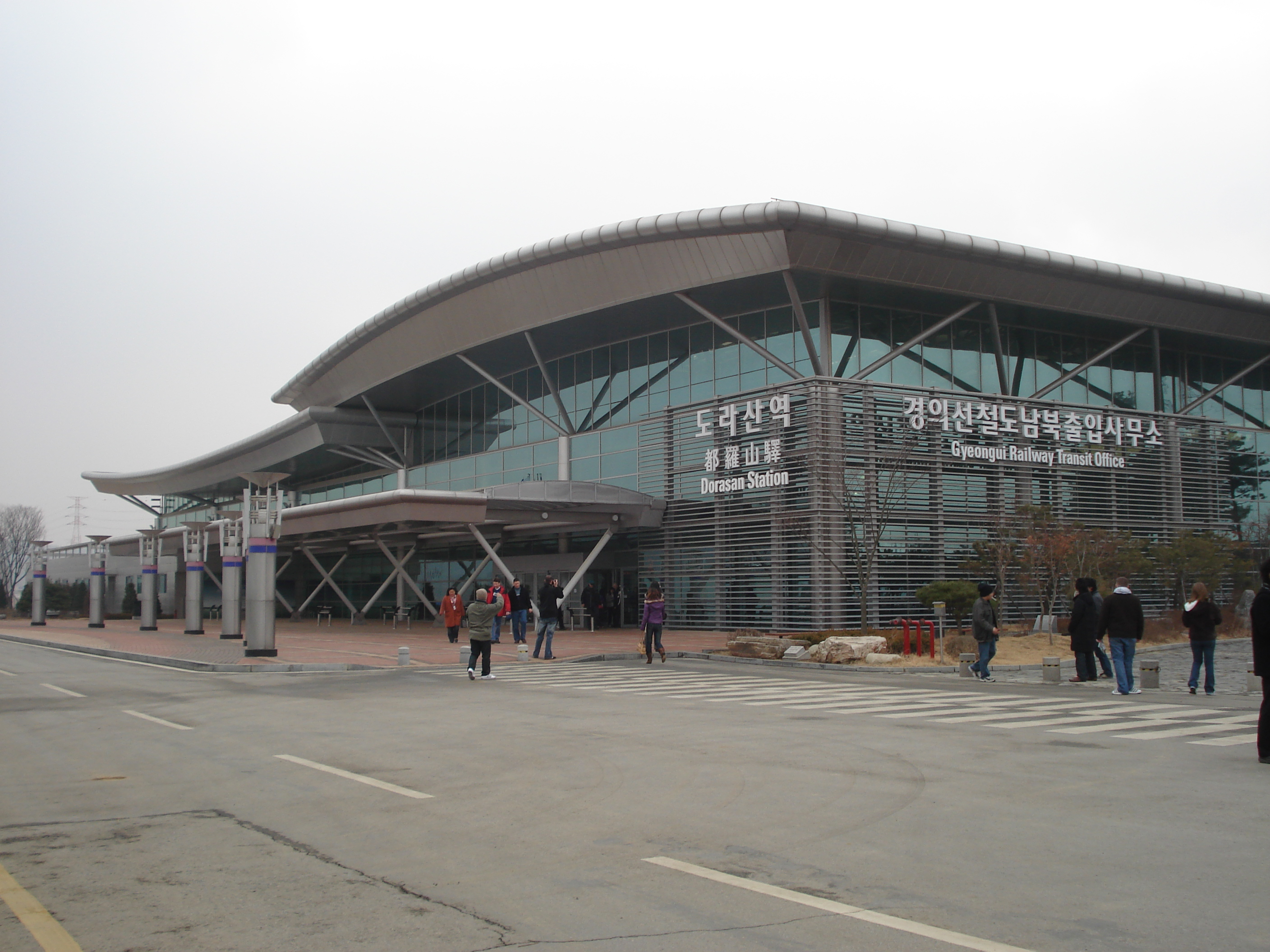
A view from Dorasan station's parking lot

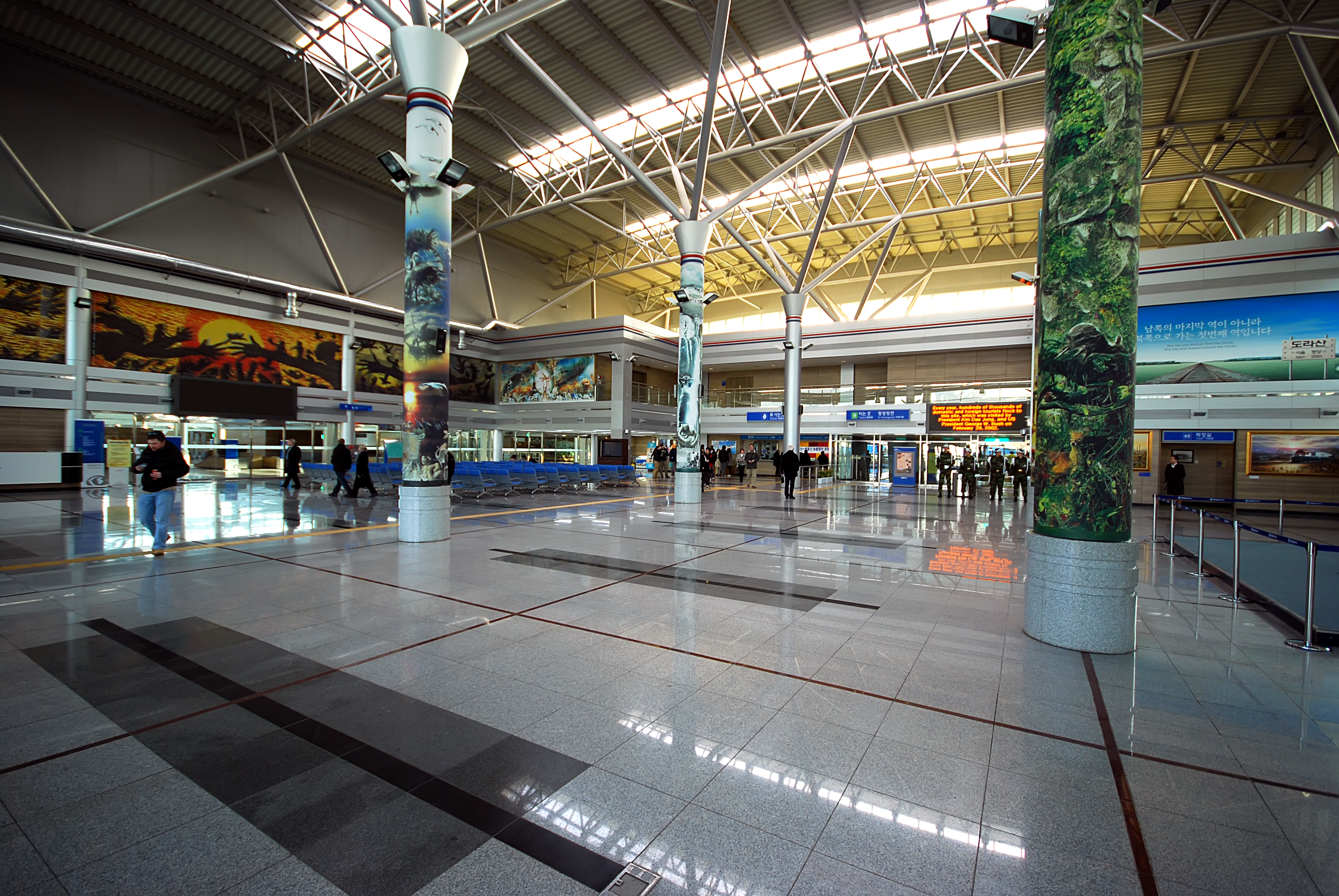
Inside Dorasan station

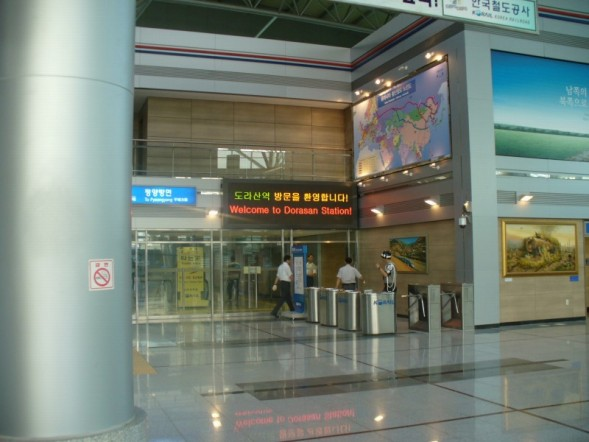
Gates to the platform

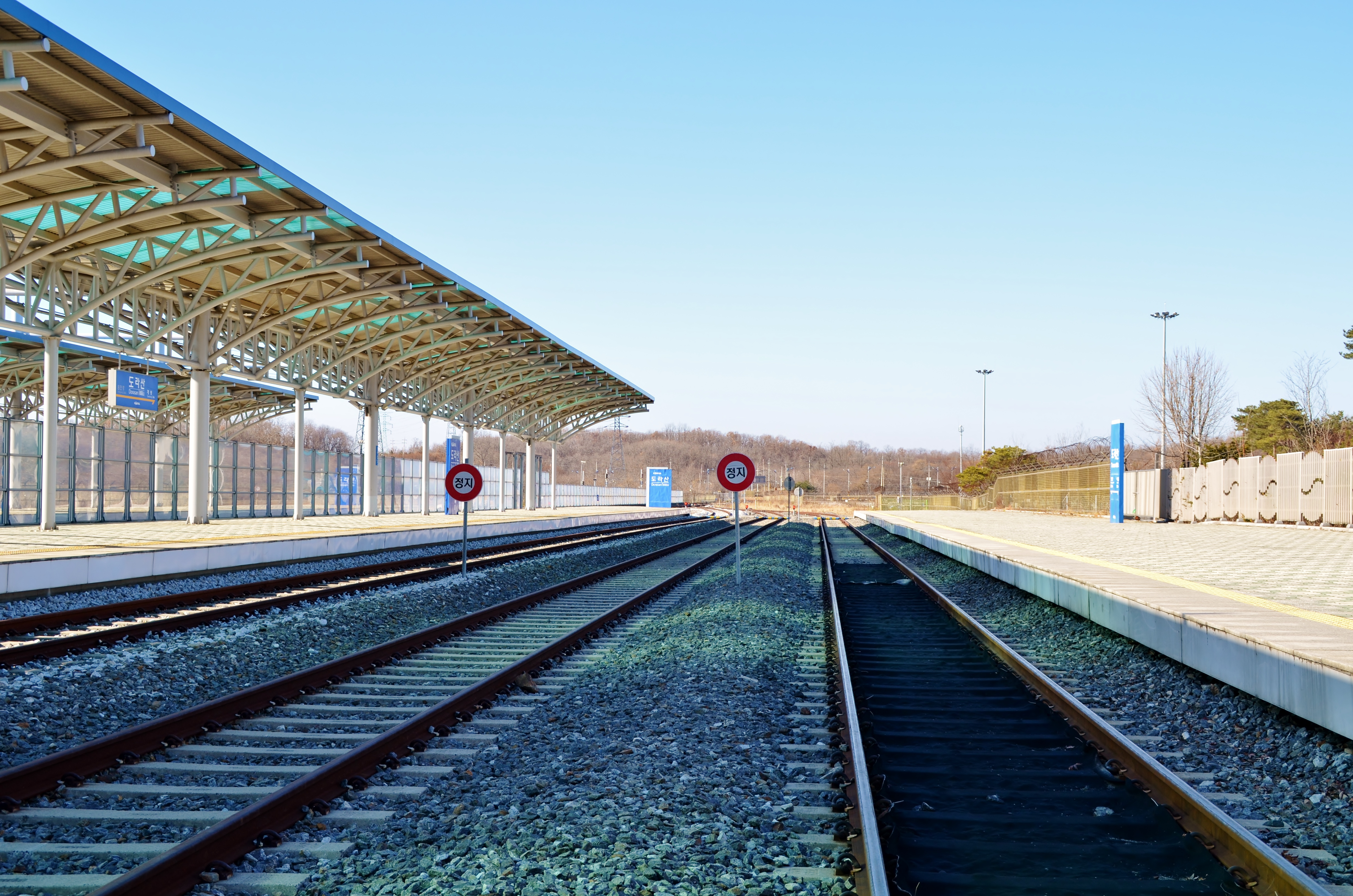
P'yŏngbu Line tracks that could bring trains to Pyongyang

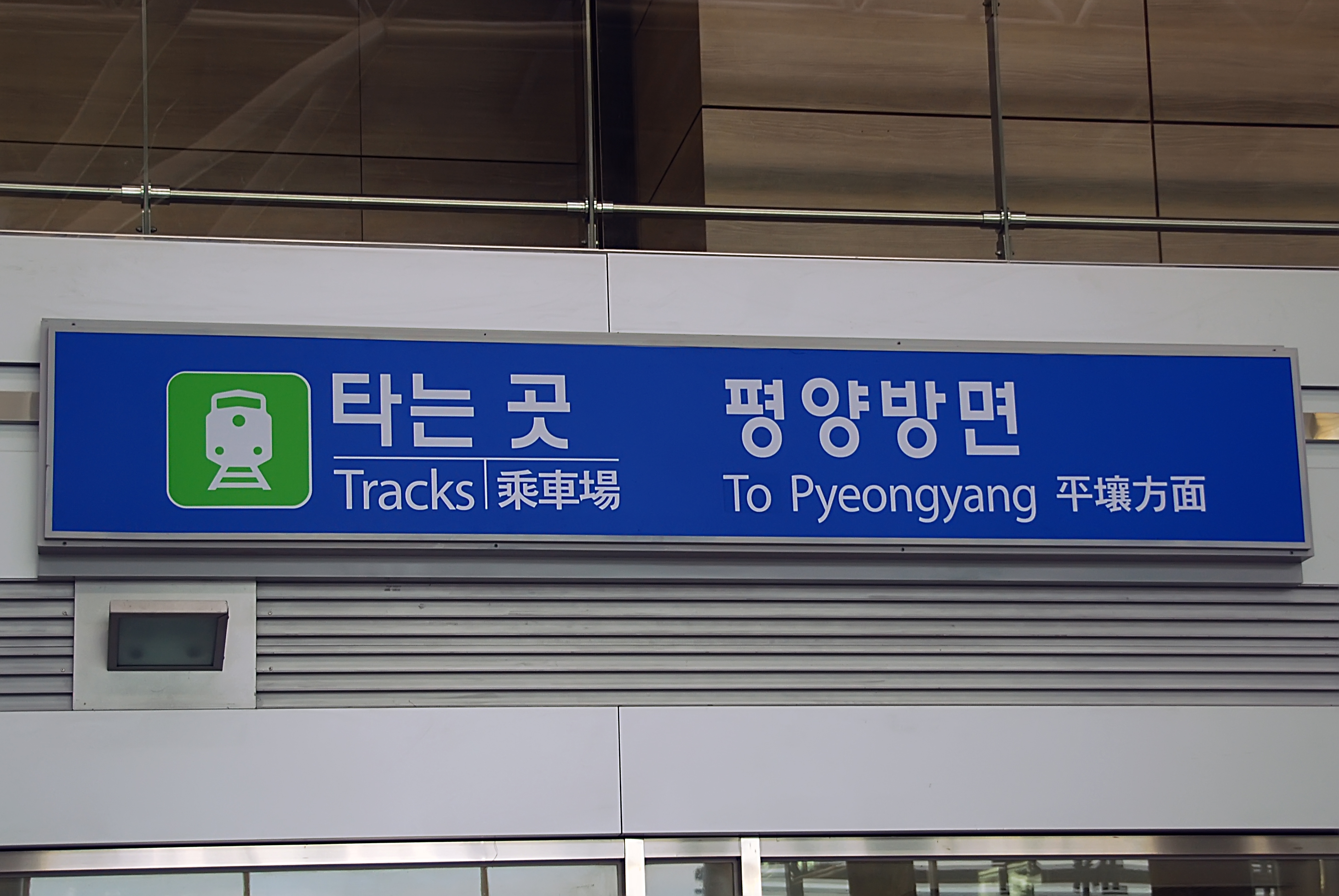
Pyeongyang sign in the Dorasan station.

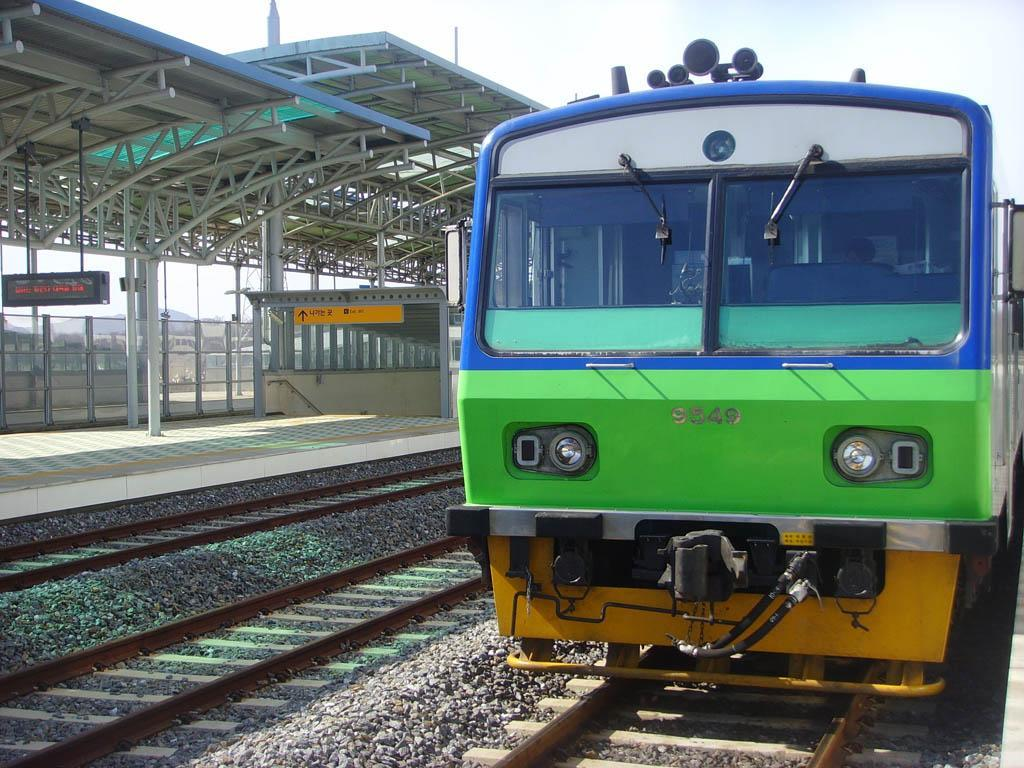
Commuter Train

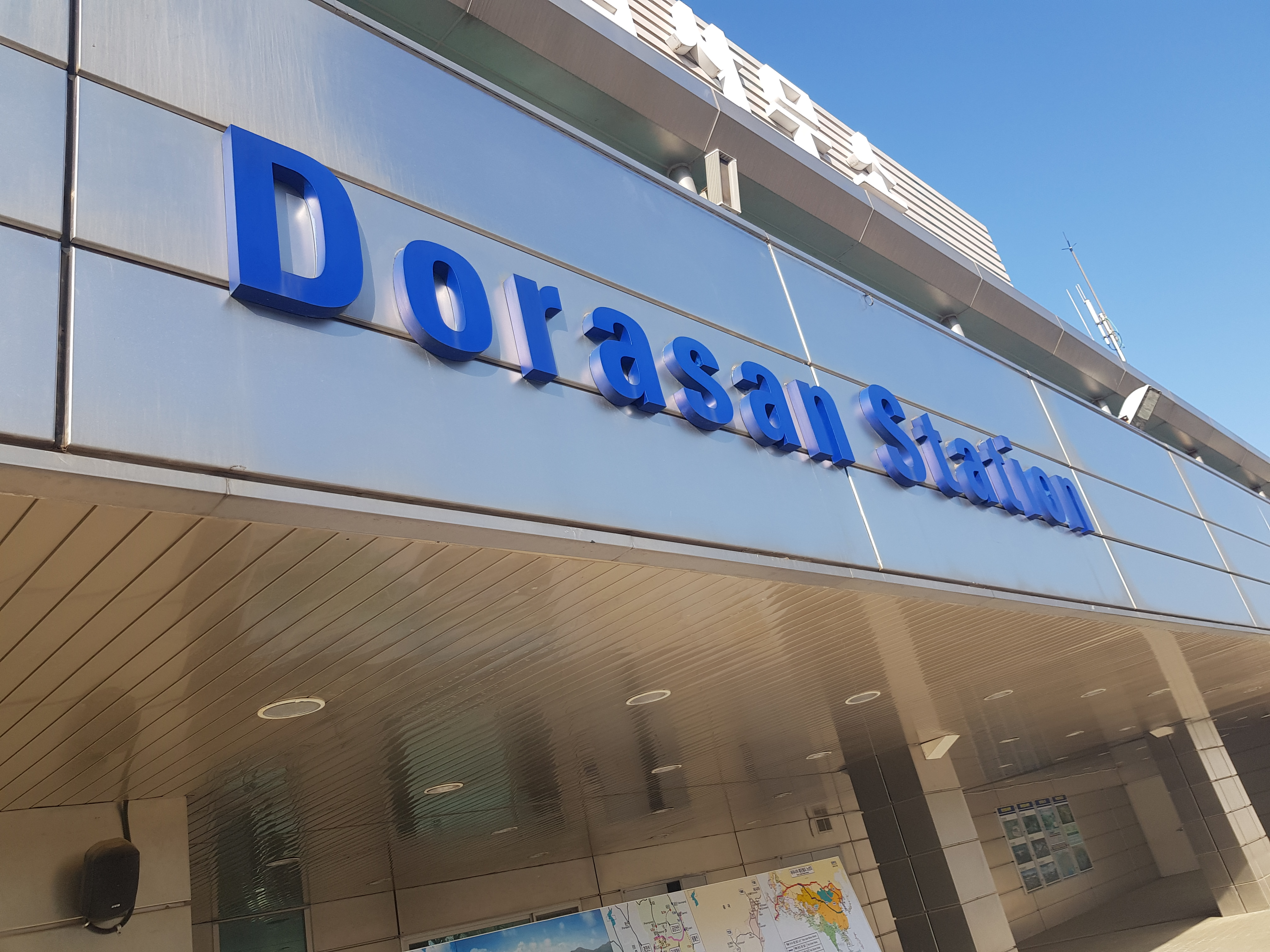
Entrance of Dorasan station

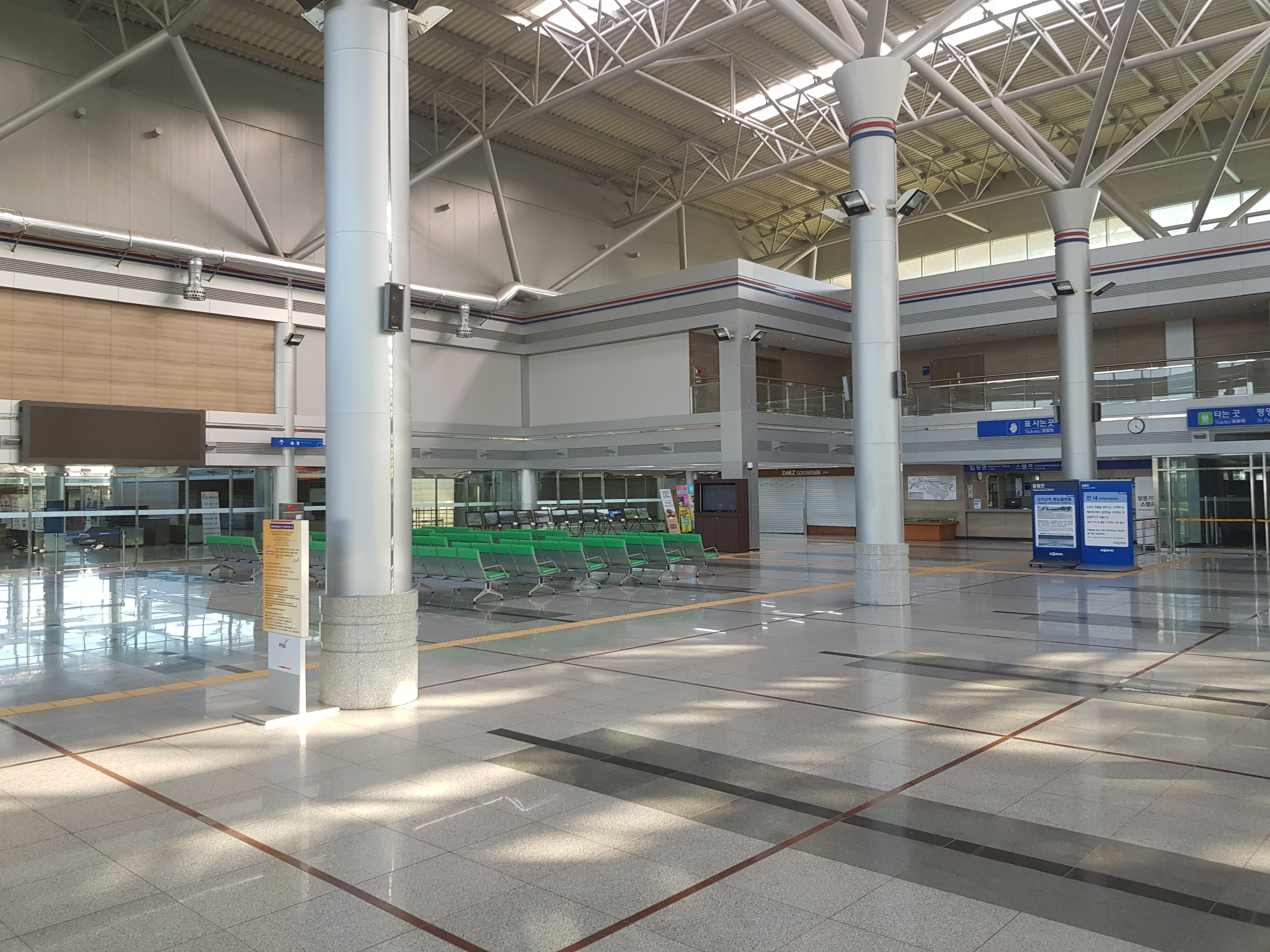
Hall of Dorasan station

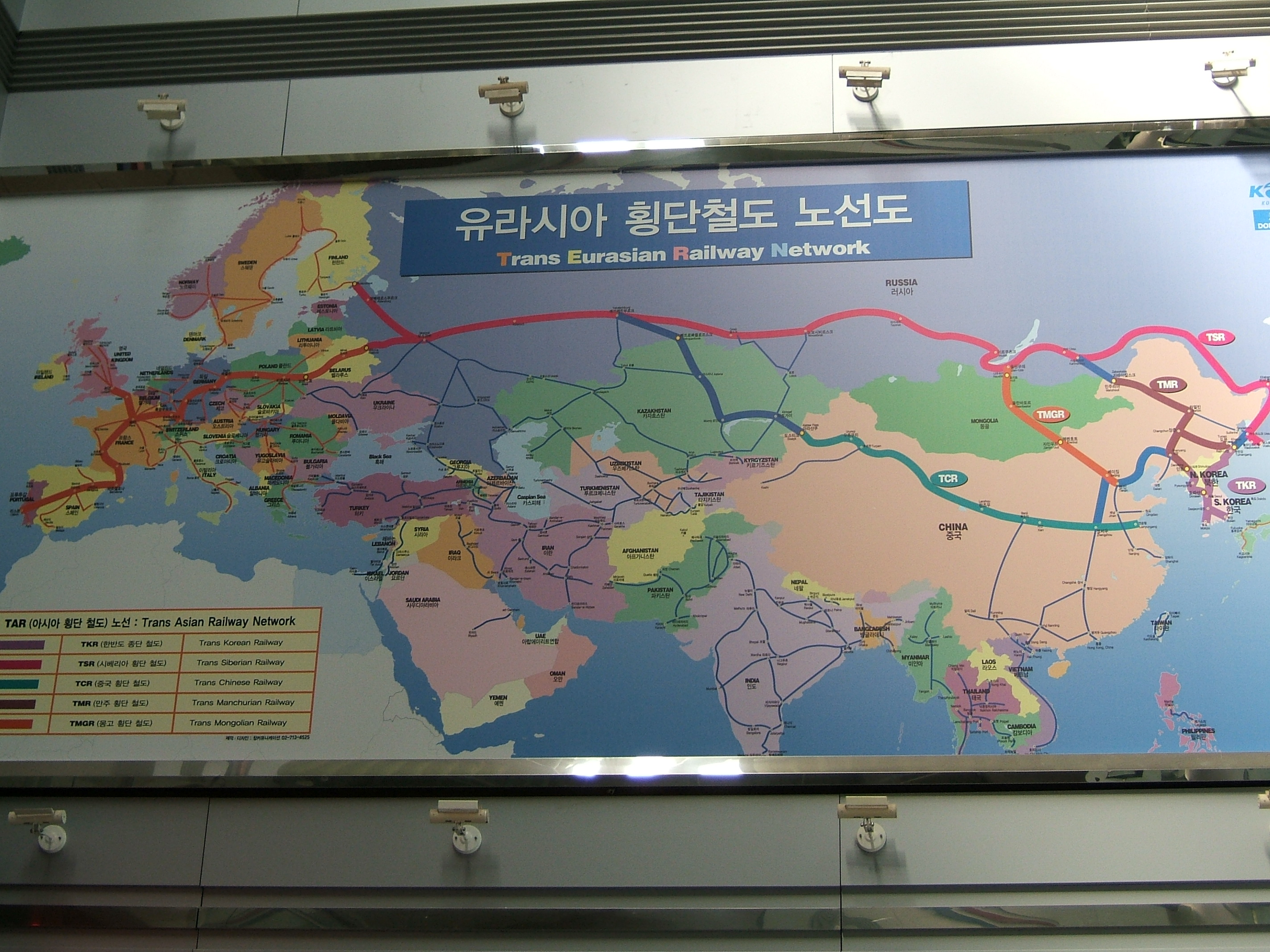
Map of the Eurasian rail network after Korean reunification in Dorasan station

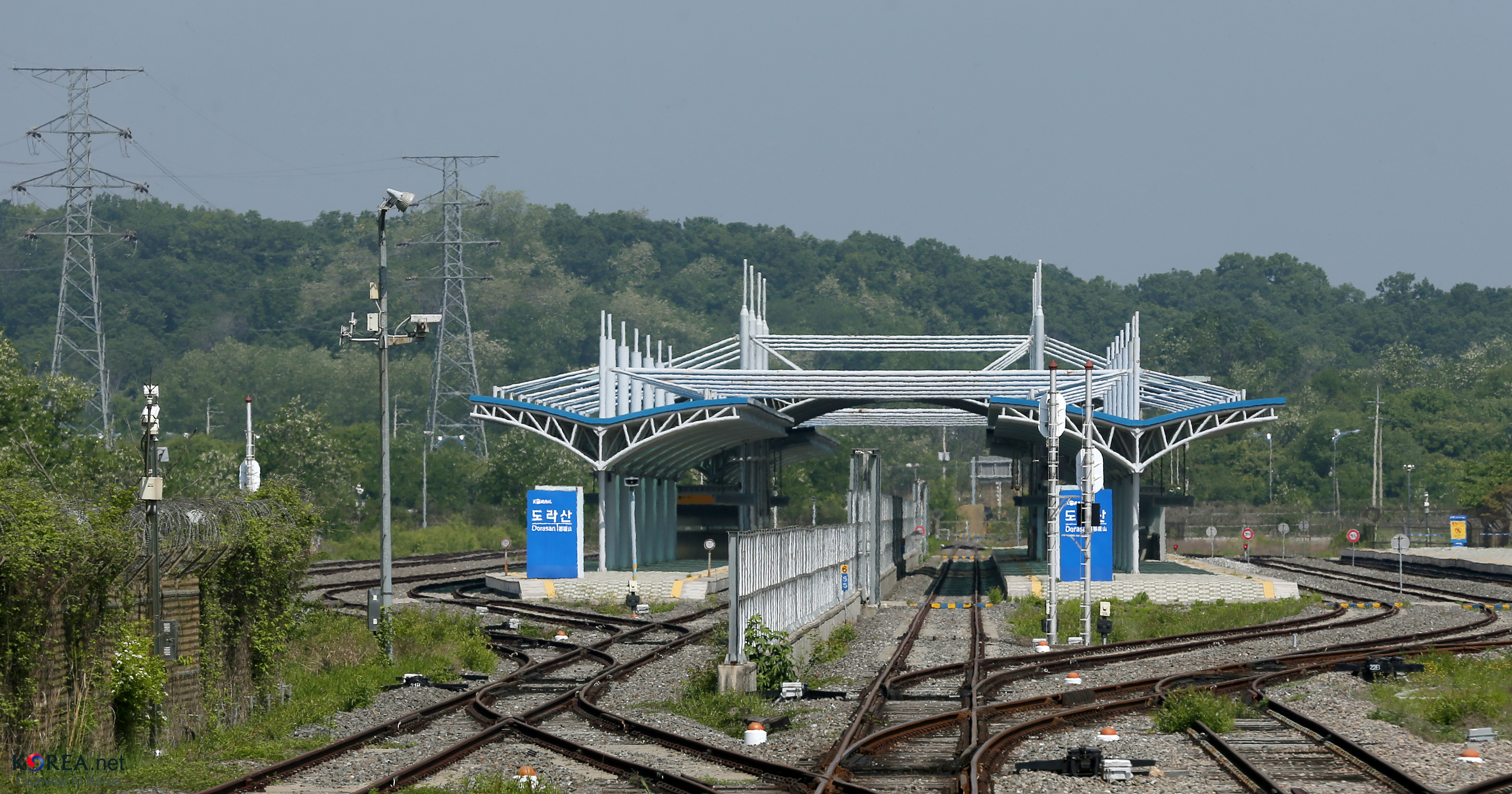
platform

== See also ==
- Division of Korea
- DMZ Train
- Dora Observatory
- Dorasan
- Korail
- Korean State Railway
- Korean Demilitarized Zone
- Pyongbu Line
