= History of the United States Air Force =

The United States Air Force became a separate military service on 18 September 1947 with the implementation of the National Security Act of 1947. The Act created the National Military Establishment, later renamed the United States Department of Defense, which was composed of four of the five branches, the Army, Marine Corps, Navy, and a newly created Air Force. Prior to 1947, the responsibility for military aviation was divided between the Army for land-based operations and the Navy and Marine Corps for sea-based operations from aircraft carrier and amphibious aircraft. The Army created the first antecedent of the Air Force on 1 August 1907, which through a succession of changes of organization, titles, and missions advanced toward eventual separation 40 years later. The predecessor organizations leading up to today's U.S. Air Force are:

- Aeronautical Division, Signal Corps (1 August 1907 – 18 July 1914)
- Aviation Section, Signal Corps (18 July 1914 – 20 May 1918)
- Division of Military Aeronautics (20 May 1918 – 24 May 1918)
- Air Service, U.S. Army (24 May 1918 – 2 July 1926)
- U.S. Army Air Corps (2 July 1926 – 20 June 1941) (Note: The Air Corps became a subordinate element of the Army Air Forces on 20 June 1941, and was abolished as an administrative organization on 9 March 1942. It continued to exist as a branch of the Army (similar to the infantry, quartermaster, or artillery) until reorganization provisions of the National Security Act of 1947.)
- U.S. Army Air Forces (20 June 1941 – 17 September 1947) (Note: The Army Air Forces were abolished by Transfer Order 1, Office of the Secretary of Defense, 26 September 1947, implementing the same provisions. Transfer Order 1 was the first of 200 Army-Air Force transfer agreements drawn up in June and July 1947, and ordered the transfer of all military and civilian personnel of the Army Air Forces to the Department of the Air Force and the USAF. The final transfer order was signed 22 June 1949.)

== World War I and between wars ==
U.S. aircraft cockade, or roundel, of late World War I

=== World War I ===
In 1917, upon the American entry into World War I, the first major U.S. aviation combat force was created when an Air Service was formed as part of the American Expeditionary Force (AEF). Major General Mason Patrick commanded the Air Service of the AEF; his deputy was Brigadier General Billy Mitchell. These aviation units, some of which were trained in France, provided tactical support for the U.S. Army, especially during the Battle of Saint-Mihiel and the Meuse-Argonne offensives. Among the aces of the AEF Air Service were Captain Eddie Rickenbacker and 2nd Lieutenant Frank Luke. Concurrent with the creation of this combat force, the U.S. Army's aviation establishment in the United States was removed from control of the Signal Corps and placed directly under the United States Secretary of War. An assistant secretary was created to direct the Army Air Service, which had dual responsibilities for development and procurement of aircraft, and raising and training of air units. With the end of the First World War, the AEF's Air Service was dissolved and the Army Air Service in the United States largely demobilized.

In 1920, the Air Service became a branch of the Army and in 1926 was renamed the Army Air Corps. During this period, the Air Corps began experimenting with new techniques, including air-to-air refueling and the development of the B-9 and the Martin B-10, the first all-metal monoplane bombers, and new fighters.

=== Billy Mitchell: Air power court martialed ===
Americans were fascinated with aviation in the 1920s and 1930s and refused to allow War Department conservatism to block innovation. General Billy Mitchell, the deputy director of the Air Service sought to wrest control of coastal defense away from the Navy. He went public insisting that his planes could sink battleships any day, a claim proven with a series of tests that culminated in the sinking of the SMS Ostfriesland. Mitchell lost his self-control in 1925 when he accused the Navy in a press release of "incompetency, criminal negligence and almost treasonable administration of the national defense." He received the highly publicized court martial he wanted, and was allowed to expound his theory that air power alone would suffice to win the next big war. He was convicted, and resigned. He became a popular hero and public opinion forced the War Department to strengthen the Air Corps. Mitchell's main argument was air power had to be autonomous—had to be controlled by fliers who understood the new technology, new tactics, new strategies, and who would not waste precious air assets in trying to assist old-fashioned armies and navies. Until his death in 1936 Mitchell, as a civilian, was a tireless prophet of airpower before numerous civilian audiences, but he lost touch with aviation developments and ceased to be influential inside the services. Indeed, his almost hysterical attacks made many generals hostile. The Air Corps managed a few publicity stunts, but always seemed to be overshadowed by glamorous civilians like Charles Lindbergh, Howard Hughes, or Amelia Earhart. In 1934 President Franklin Roosevelt, feuding with the airline industry, suddenly turned the delivery of air mail over to the Air Corps. Multiple crashes by inexperienced Air Corps pilots in mediocre planes with poor navigation gear emphasized the fragility of the new service, and undercut its claims that in wartime it could perform miracles. Roosevelt, however, had become a firm believer in air power and had behind him both public opinion and Congress. When mobilization began in spring 1940 Roosevelt was as energetic as anyone in expanding the Air Corps role, calling for 50,000 planes a year, and sending the best new models to Britain for its war against the Luftwaffe.

=== Command structure ===
In 1935, as a result of recommendations from two civilian review boards, the next advancement toward independence for the Air Force occurred when all flying units, which heretofore had been distributed to various ground commands, were grouped together as an aerial task force under one air commander as the General Headquarters Air Force. The Air Corps, headed by the Chief of the Air Corps, continued as before but now held responsibility only for supply, airfields, and training, in effect splitting the Air Force into two parts. Both were commanded by major generals (Frank Andrews and Oscar Westover, followed by Henry H. ("Hap") Arnold).

=== Technology ===
In 1937, the B-17 Flying Fortress made its first appearance. In a feat of navigation impressive for the time, three B-17s intercepted the Italian passenger liner Rex at sea. Though intended to demonstrate the ability of the Air Corps to defend the nation's coasts, the mission also indicated the emerging doctrine within the Air Corps of the supremacy of strategic bombing.

During World War I, aviation technology developed rapidly; however, the Army's reluctance to use the new technology began to make airmen think that as long as the Army controlled aviation, development would be stunted and a potentially valuable force neglected. Air Service senior officer Billy Mitchell began to campaign for an independent Air Force, co-equal to the Army and Navy. But his campaign offended many and resulted in a court martial in 1925 that effectively ended his career. His followers, including future aviation leaders "Hap" Arnold and Carl Spaatz, saw the lack of public, congressional, and military support that Mitchell received and decided that America was not ready for an independent air force. Under the leadership of its chief of staff Mason Patrick and, later, Arnold, the Air Corps waited until the time to fight for independence arose again.

== World War II ==
U.S. aircraft roundel primarily of the interwar years to early World War II

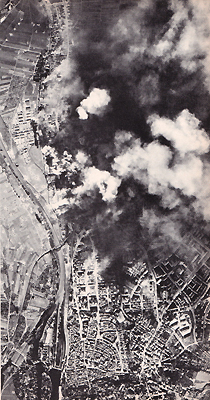
1943 USAAF raid on ball-bearing works at Schweinfurt, Germany.

The Air Force came of age in World War II. President Franklin D. Roosevelt took the lead after the Munich Agreement, calling for a vastly enlarged air force based on long-range strategic bombing. President Roosevelt instituted a plan to construct 15,000 military aircraft per year, which grew to 50,000 per year after the Axis victory in the Battle of France. Organizationally it became largely independent from the Army in 1941, when the Army Air Corps became a part of the new U.S. Army Air Forces (AAF), and the GHQ Air Force was re-designated the subordinate Combat Command. In the major reorganization of the Army by War Department Circular 59, effective March 9, 1942, the newly created Army Air Forces gained equal voice with the Army and Navy on the Joint Chiefs of Staff and complete autonomy from the Army Ground Forces and the Services of Supply, serving as a separate service in all but name. The reorganization also eliminated both Combat Command and the Air Corps as organizations (the latter remained a combat branch of the Army until 1947) in favor of a streamlined system of commands and numbered air forces for decentralized management of the burgeoning Army Air Forces.

The reorganization merged all aviation elements of the former Air Corps into the Army Air Forces. Although the Air Corps still legally existed as an Army branch, the position and Office of the Chief of the Air Corps was dissolved.

Major General Carl A. Spaatz took command of the Eighth Air Force in London in 1942; with Brigadier General Ira Eaker as second in command, he supervised the strategic bombing campaign. In late 1943, Spaatz was made commander of the new U.S. Strategic Air Forces, reporting directly to the Combined Chiefs of Staff. Spaatz began daylight bombing operations using the prewar doctrine of flying bombers in close formations, relying on their combined defensive firepower for protection from attacking enemy aircraft rather than supporting fighter escorts. The doctrine proved flawed when deep-penetration missions beyond the range of escort fighters were attempted, because German Luftwaffe fighter planes overwhelmed U.S. formations, shooting down bombers in excess of "acceptable" loss rates, especially in combination with the vast number of flak anti-aircraft batteries defending Nazi Germany's major targets. American fliers took heavy casualties during the Operation Tidal Wave raids on the oil refineries of Ploiești, Romania, and the ball-bearing factories at Schweinfurt and Regensburg, Germany, and it was the loss rate in crews and not materiel that brought about a pullback from the strategic offensive in the autumn of 1943.

The Eighth Air Force had attempted to use both the Republic P-47 Thunderbolt and the Lockheed P-38 Lightning as escorts, but while the Thunderbolt was a capable dog-fighter it lacked the range, even with the addition of drop tanks to extend its range, and the Lightning proved mechanically unreliable in the frigid altitudes at which the missions were fought. Bomber protection was greatly improved after the introduction of North American P-51 Mustang fighters in Europe. With its built-in extended range and competitive or superior performance characteristics in comparison to all existing German piston-engine fighters, the Mustang was an immediately available solution to the crisis. In January 1944 the Eighth Air Force obtained priority in equipping its groups, so that ultimately 14 of its 15 groups fielded Mustangs. P-51 escorts began operations in February 1944 and increased their numbers rapidly, so that the Luftwaffe suffered increasing fighter losses in aerial engagements beginning with Big Week in early 1944. Allied fighters were also granted free rein in attacking German fighter airfields, both in pre-planned missions and while returning to base from escort duties, and the major Luftwaffe threat against Allied bombers was severely diminished by D-Day.

In the Pacific Theater of Operations, the AAF provided major tactical support under General George Kenney to Douglas MacArthur in the South West Pacific theater. Kenney's pilots invented the skip-bombing technique against Japanese ships. Kenney's forces claimed destruction of 11,900 Japanese planes and 1.7 million tons of shipping. The first development and sustained implementation of airlift by American air forces occurred between May 1942 and November 1945 as hundreds of transports flew more than half a million tons of supplies from India to China over the Hump.

The AAF created the Twentieth Air Force to employ long-range B-29 Superfortress bombers in strategic attacks on Japanese cities. The use of forward bases in Free China (needed to be able to reach Japan by the heavily laden B-29's) was ineffective because of the difficulty in logistically supporting the bases entirely by air from its main bases in British India, and because of a persistent threat against the Chinese airfields by the Imperial Japanese Army. After the Mariana Islands were captured in the Mariana and Palau Islands campaign of mid-1944, providing locations for air bases that could be supplied by sea, Arnold moved all B-29 operations there by April 1945 and made General Curtis LeMay his bomber commander (reporting directly to Arnold, who personally commanded Twentieth Air Force until July). LeMay reasoned that the Imperial Japanese economy, much of which was cottage industry in dense urban areas where manufacturing and assembly plants were also located, was particularly vulnerable to area attack and abandoned inefficient high-altitude precision bombing in favor of low-level incendiary bombings aimed at destroying large urban areas. On the night of March 9–10, 1945, the bombing of Tokyo and the resulting conflagration resulted in the death of over 100,000 persons. 350,000 people died in 66 other Japanese cities as a result of this shift to incendiary bombing. At the same time, the B-29 was also employed in widespread mining of Japanese harbors and sea lanes. In early August 1945, the Twentieth Air Force conducted atomic bomb attacks on Hiroshima and Nagasaki in response to Japan's rejection of the Potsdam Declaration which outlined the terms of surrender for Japan. Both cities were destroyed with enormous loss of life and psychological shock. On August 15, Emperor Hirohito announced the surrender of Japan, stating:

Moreover, the enemy has begun to employ a new and most cruel bomb, the power of which to do damage is indeed incalculable, taking the toll of many innocent lives. Should We continue to fight, it would not only result in an ultimate collapse and obliteration of the Japanese nation, but also it would lead to the total extinction of human civilization. Such being the case, how are We to save the millions of Our subjects; or to atone Ourselves before the hallowed spirits of Our Imperial Ancestors? This is the reason why We have ordered the acceptance of the provisions of the Joint Declaration of the Powers.

== Cold War and Korean War ==
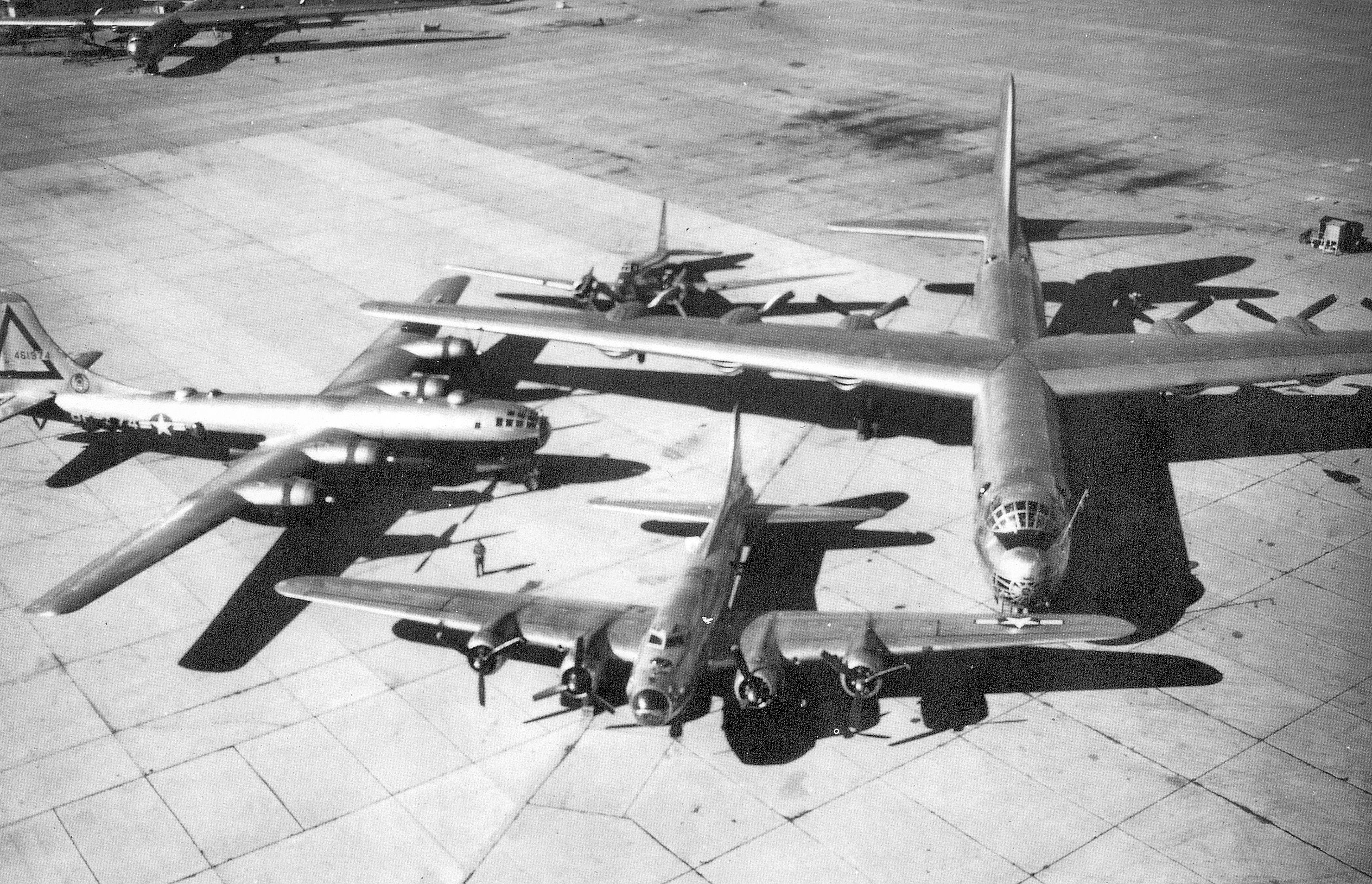
Special photo of Air Force bombers from the 1930s through the late 1940s. A Douglas B-18 "Bolo"; a Boeing B-17 "Flying Fortress"; a Boeing "B-29 Superfortress" and the B-36 "Peacemaker" dominating the group photo with a 230 Ft Wingspan. Taken at Carswell AFB, Texas after the receipt of the first B-36 in 1948. Note the Strategic Air Command 7th Bombardment Wing marking on the B-29.

Early American military space activities began immediately after the conclusion of the Second World War. On 20 June 1944, MW 18014, a German Heer A-4 ballistic missile launched from the Peenemünde Army Research Center became the first artificial object to cross the Kármán line, the boundary between air and space. The A-4 ballistic missile, more commonly known as the V-2, was used by the German Wehrmacht to launch long ranged attacks on Allied Forces cities on the Western Front, however its designer, Wernher von Braun, had aspirations to use it as a space launch vehicle, defecting to the United States at the end of the war. A number of former German scientists, along with significant amounts of research material, were covertly moved to the United States as part of Operation Paperclip, jumpstarting the space program.

In practice, the Army Air Forces became virtually independent of the Army during World War II, but its leaders wanted formal independence. In November 1945, General Dwight D. Eisenhower became Army Chief of Staff, while General Carl Spaatz began to assume the duties of Commanding General, Army Air Forces, in anticipation of General Arnold's announced retirement. One of General Eisenhower's first actions was to appoint a board of officers, headed by Lieutenant General William H. Simpson, to prepare a definitive plan for the reorganization of the Army and the Air Force that could be effected without enabling legislation and would provide for the separation of the Air Force from the Army. On 29 January 1946 "Generals Eisenhower and Spaatz agreed on an Air Force organization composed of Strategic Air Command, Air Defense Command, Tactical Air Command, Air Transport Command, Air Technical Service Command, Air Training Command, the Air University, and the Air Force Center."

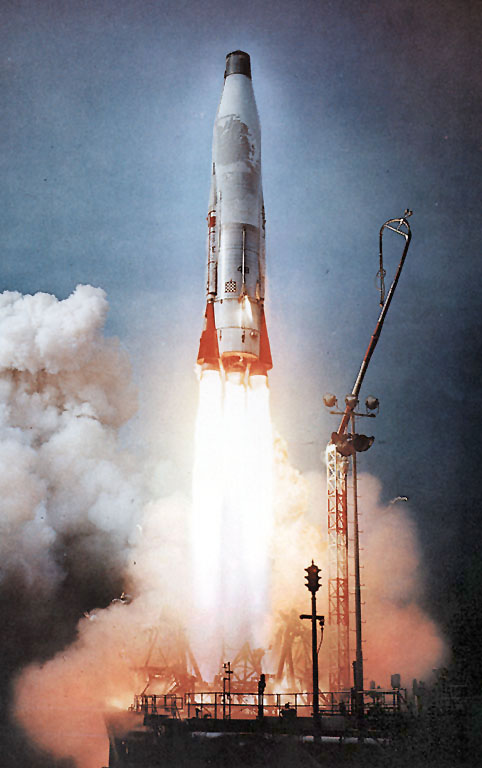
Test launch of a SM-65B Atlas intercontinental ballistic missile from Cape Canaveral Launch Complex 14.

On 12 November 1945, General of the Army Henry H. Arnold, the commanding general of the United States Army Air Forces, sent a report to Secretary of War Robert P. Patterson emphasizing that the future United States Air Force would need to invest heavily in space and ballistic missile capabilities, rather than just focus on current aircraft. General Arnold received strong backing from Theodore von Kármán, the head of the Army Air Forces Scientific Advisory Group, and later United States Air Force Scientific Advisory Board. A 1946 study by Project RAND, directed by General Arnold and conducted by Louis Ridenour to determine the feasibility of a strategic reconnaissance satellite, identified nearly all future space mission areas, including intelligence, weather forecasting, satellite communications, and satellite navigation.

The first instance of interservice rivalry in military space development occurred in 1946, when the United States Navy Bureau of Aeronautics Electronics Division proposed testing the feasibility of an artificial satellite, however it was unable to get Navy funding to attempt a launch, instead requesting a joint program with the War Department Aeronautical Board. General Carl Spaatz, commanding general of the Army Air Forces and later the first chief of staff of the Air Force and Major General Curtis LeMay, then Deputy Chief of Staff for Research and Development, denied the Navy's request, as their position was that military space was an extension of strategic air power and thus an Air Force mission. By 1948, the Navy had suspended its satellite program, focusing instead on rocketry.

Over the continuing objections of the Navy, which feared losing its air arm and strategic role to the new service, the United States Department of the Air Force was created by the National Security Act of 1947. It became effective 18 September 1947 when the first Secretary of the Air Force, Stuart Symington, took office. In 1948, the service chiefs agreed on usage of air assets under the Key West Agreement.

On 18 September 1947, the Army Air Forces became the United States Air Force as a separate and equal element of the United States Armed Forces. The fledgling Air Force quickly established its own identity. Army Air Fields were renamed Air Force Bases and personnel were soon being issued new uniforms with new rank insignia. Once the new Air Force was free of army domination, its first job was to discard the old and inadequate ground army organizational structure. This was the "Base Plan" where the combat group commander reported to the base commander, who was often regular army, with no flying experience.

General Carl A. Spaatz established a new policy, "No tactical commander should be subordinate to the station commander". This resulted in a search for a better arrangement. The commander of the 15th Air Force, Major General Charles Born, proposed the Provisional Wing Plan, which basically reversed the situation and put the wing commander over the base commander. The USAF basic organizational unit became the Base-Wing.

Under this plan, the base support functions – supply, base operations, transportation, security, and medical were assigned to squadrons, usually commanded by a Major or Lieutenant Colonel. All of these squadrons were assigned to a Combat Support Group, commanded by a Base Commander, usually a Colonel. Combat fighter or bomber squadrons were assigned to the Combat Group, a retention of the USAAF Group. All of these groups, both combat and combat support, were in turn assigned to the Wing, commanded by a Wing Commander. This way the Wing Commander commanded both the combat operational elements on the base as well as the non-operational elements. The Wing Commander was an experienced air combat leader, usually a Colonel or Brigadier General. All of the hierarchical organizations carried the same numerical designation. In this manner, for example, the 28th became the designation for the Wing and all the subordinate groups and squadrons beneath it. As a result, the base and the wing became one and the same unit. On 16 June 1952, the legacy combat groups were inactivated and the operational Combat Squadrons were assigned directly to the Wing. The World War II history, lineage and honors of the combat group were bestowed on the Wing upon its inactivation.

The USAAF Wing then was redesignated as an Air Division, which was commanded Brigadier General or higher, who commanded two or more wings usually, but not always, on a single base. Numbered Air Forces (NAF) commanded both Air Divisions or Wings directly, and the NAF was under the Major Command (SAC, TAC, ADC, etc.).

After World War II, relations between the United States and the Soviet Union began to deteriorate, and the period in history known as the Cold War began. The United States entered an arms race with the Soviet Union and competition aimed at increasing each nation's influence throughout the world. In response, the United States expanded its military presence throughout the world. The USAF opened air bases throughout Europe, and later in Japan and South Korea. The United States also built air bases on the British overseas territories of British Indian Ocean Territory and Ascension Island in the South Atlantic.

The first test for the USAF during the Cold War came in 1948, when Communist authorities in the Soviet occupation zone of Germany cut off road and air transportation to West Berlin. The USAF, along with the Royal Air Force (RAF) and Commonwealth air forces, supplied the city during the Berlin airlift under Operation Vittles, using C-54 Skymasters. The efforts of these air forces saved the city from starvation and forced the Soviets to back down in their blockade.

Conflict over post-war military administration, especially with regard to the roles and missions to be assigned to the Air Force and the U.S. Navy, led to an episode called the "Revolt of the Admirals" in the late 1940s, in which high-ranking Navy officers argued unsuccessfully for the case for carrier-based aircraft rather than strategic bombers.

In 1947, the USAF began Project Sign, a study of unidentified flying objects what would be twice revived (first as Project Grudge and finally as Project Blue Book) and which would last until 1969.

In 1948 the Women's Armed Services Integration Act gave women permanent status in the Regular and Reserve forces of the Air Force. On 8 July 1948, Esther McGowin Blake became the first woman in the Air Force, enlisting the first minute of the first hour of the first day regular Air Force duty was authorized for women.

During the Korean War, which began in June 1950, the Far East Air Forces (FEAF) were among the first units to respond to the invasion by North Korea, but quickly lost its main airbase at Kimpo, South Korea. Designated to provide close air support to the defenders of the Pusan pocket from bases in Japan, the FEAF also conducted a strategic bombing campaign against North Korea simultaneously. General Douglas MacArthur's landing at Inchon in September 1950 enabled the FEAF to return to Korea and develop bases from which they supported MacArthur's UN offensive into North Korea.

When the Chinese People's Volunteer Army attacked in December 1950, the USAF provided tactical air support. The introduction of Soviet-made MiG-15 jet fighters caused problems for the B-29s used to bomb North Korea, but the USAF countered the MiGs with its new F-86 Sabre jet fighters. Although both air superiority and close air support missions were successful, a lengthy attempt to interdict communist supply lines by air attack was not as successful and was replaced by a systematic campaign to inflict as much economic cost to North Korea and the Chinese forces as long as war persisted, including attacks on the capital city of Pyongyang and against the North Korean hydroelectric system.

== Vietnam War ==
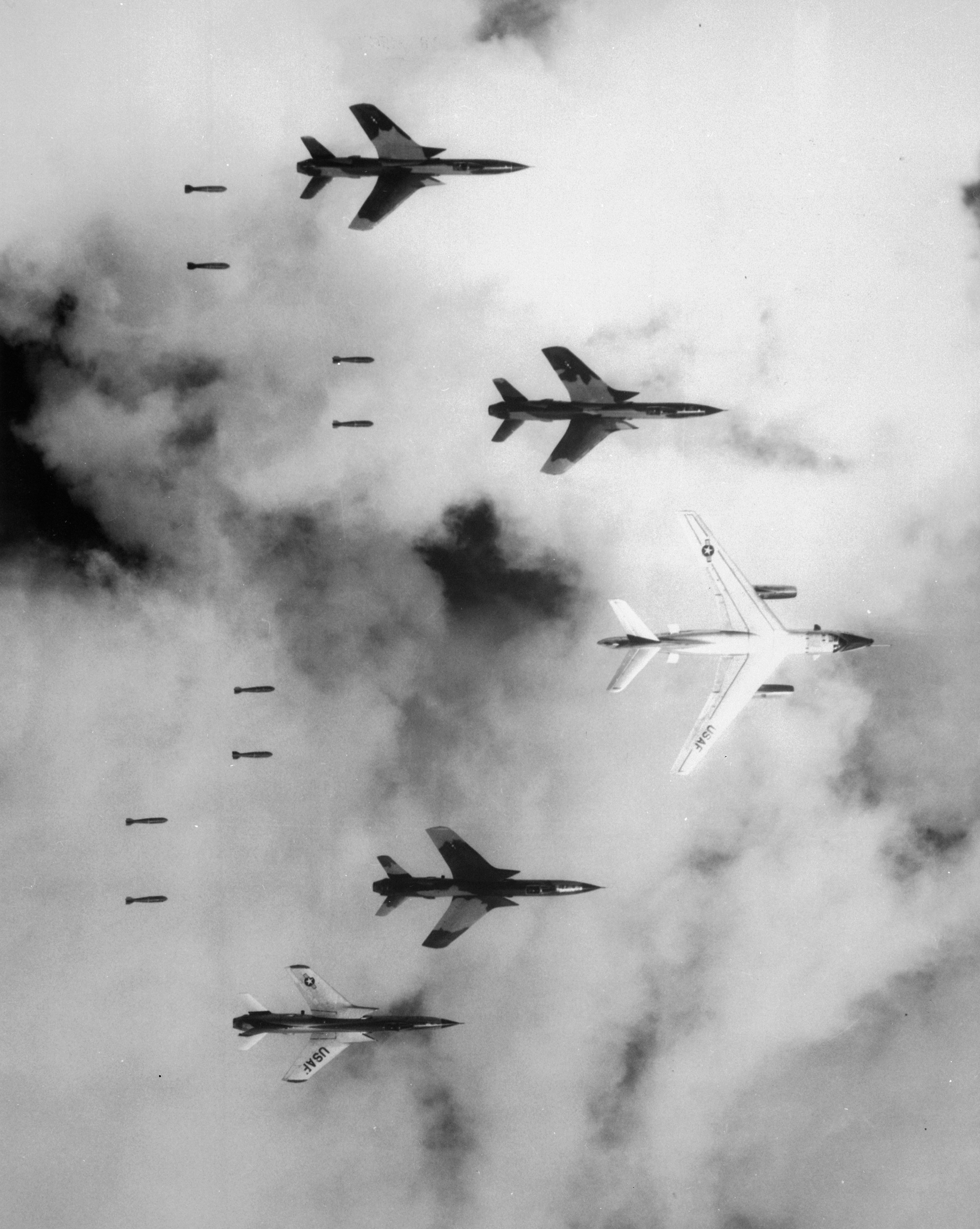
A U.S. B-66 Destroyer and four F-105 Thunderchiefs dropping bombs on North Vietnam in 1966

The USAF was heavily deployed during the Vietnam War. The first bombing raids against North Vietnam occurred in 1964, following the Gulf of Tonkin Incident. In March 1965, a sustained bombing campaign began, code-named Operation Rolling Thunder. This campaign's purpose was to destroy the will of the North Vietnamese to fight, destroy industrial bases and air defenses, and to stop the flow of men and supplies down the Ho Chi Minh Trail, while forcing North Vietnam into peace negotiations. The USAF dropped more bombs in all combat operations in Vietnam during the period 1965–68 than it did during World War II, and the Rolling Thunder campaign lasted until the U.S. presidential election of 1968. Except for heavily damaging the North Vietnamese economy and infrastructure, Rolling Thunder failed in its political and strategic goals.

The USAF also played a critical role in defeating the North Vietnam People's Army's Easter Offensive of 1972. The rapid redeployment of fighters, bombers, and attack aircraft helped the Army of the Republic of Vietnam repel the invasion. Operation Linebacker demonstrated to both the North and South Vietnamese that even without significant U.S. Army ground forces, the United States could still influence the war. The air war for the United States ended with Operation Linebacker II, also known as the "Christmas Bombings." These helped to finalize the Paris peace negotiations.

The insurgent nature of combat operations early in the war, and the necessity of interdicting the North Vietnamese regular army and its supply lines in third-party countries of Southeast Asia led to the development of a significant special operations capability within the USAF. Provisional and experimental concepts such as air commandos and aerial gunships, tactical missions such as Operation Ivory Coast deep inside enemy territory, and a dedicated Combat Search and Rescue mission resulted in development of operational doctrines, units, and equipment.

== Combat operations since 1975 ==
The USAF modernized its tactical air forces in the late 1970s with the introduction of the F-15, A-10, and F-16 fighters, and the implementation of realistic training scenarios under the aegis of Red Flag. In turn, it also upgraded the equipment and capabilities of its Air Reserve Components (ARC) by the equipping of both the Air National Guard and Air Force Reserve with first-line aircraft.

Expanding its force structure in the 1980s to 40 fighter wings and drawing further on the lessons of the Vietnam War, the USAF also dedicated units and aircraft to Electronic Warfare (EW) and the Suppression of Enemy Air Defenses (SEAD). The humiliating failure in April 1980 of the Operation Eagle Claw rescue mission in Iran resulted directly in an increased USAF emphasis on participation in the doctrine, equipment, personnel, and planning of Joint Special Operations.

The USAF provided attack, airlift, and combat support capability for the invasion of Grenada in 1983, the bombing of Libya in 1986, and invasion of Panama in 1989. Lessons learned in these operations were applied to its force structure and doctrine, and became the basis for successful air operations in the 1990s and after September 11, 2001.

The development of satellite reconnaissance during the Cold War, the extensive use of both tactical and strategic aerial reconnaissance during numerous combat operations, and the nuclear war deterrent role of the USAF resulted in the recognition of space as a possible combat arena. An emphasis on "aerospace" operations and doctrine grew in the 1980s. Missile warning and space operations were combined to form Air Force Space Command in 1982. In 1991, Operation Desert Storm provided emphasis for the command's new focus on supporting combat operations.

The creation of the internet and the universality of computer technology as a basic warfighting tool resulted in the priority development of cyber warfare techniques and defenses by the USAF.

=== Gulf War ===
The USAF provided the bulk of the Coalition air power during the Gulf War in 1991, flying alongside aircraft of the U.S. Navy. The F-117 Nighthawk stealth fighter's capabilities were shown on the first night of the air war when it was able to bomb central Baghdad and avoid the sophisticated Iraqi anti-aircraft defenses. The USAF, along with the U.S. Navy, later patrolled the skies of northern and southern Iraq after the war to ensure that Ba'athist Iraq's air defense capability could not be rebuilt: Operation Provide Comfort 1991–96 and Operation Northern Watch 1997–2003 – no-fly zones north of the 36th parallel north and Operation Southern Watch – no-fly zone south of the 33rd parallel north.

In 1996, Operation Desert Strike and 1998 Operation Desert Fox, the USAF bombed military and chemical targets in Iraq.

=== Bosnia and Kosovo ===
The USAF led the NATO intervention in Bosnia and Herzegovina with no-fly zones (Operation Deny Flight) 1993–96 and in 1995 with air strikes against the Republika Srpska (Operation Deliberate Force). This was the first time that USAF aircraft took part in military action as part of a NATO mission. The USAF led the strike forces as the NATO Air Force (otherwise mainly composed of RAF and Luftwaffe aircraft) with the greatest capability to launch air strikes over a long period of time. In 1999, the USAF led NATO air strikes against Serbia and Montenegro during the Kosovo War (Operation Allied Force).

=== Global war on terror ===
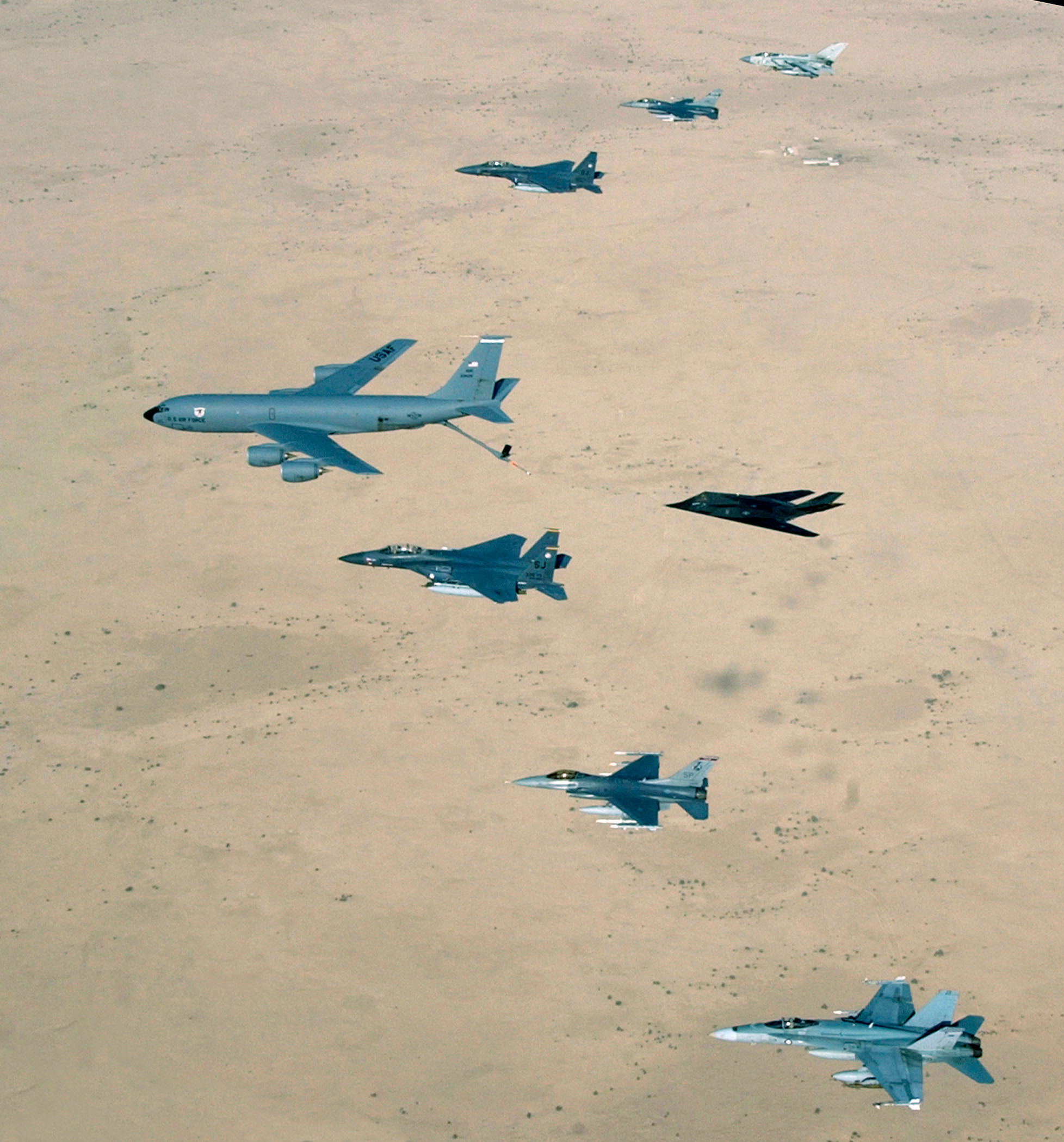
Aircraft of the 379th Air Expeditionary Wing and coalition counterparts stationed together at Al Udeid Air Base, Qatar, in southwest Asia, fly over the desert. April 14, 2003. Aircraft include KC-135 Stratotanker, F-15E Strike Eagle, F-117 Nighthawk, F-16CJ Falcon, British Tornado GR4, and Australian F/A-18 Hornet.

At the beginning of the war on terror in 2001, the USAF was deployed against the First Islamic Emirate of Afghanistan. Operating from Diego Garcia, B-52 Stratofortress and B-1 Lancer bombers attacked Taliban positions. The USAF deployed daisy cutter bombs, dropped from C-130 Hercules cargo planes, for the first time since the Vietnam War. During this conflict, the USAF opened up bases in Central Asia for the first time.

The USAF was deployed in the 2003 invasion of Iraq. Following the defeat of Saddam Hussein's regime, the USAF took over Baghdad International Airport as a base. USAF aircraft were used to provide support to the Multi-National Force – Iraq and the Iraqi security forces in major operations to eliminate insurgent centers of activity and supply in north and west Iraq. Operations in both Afghanistan and Iraq demonstrated the effective utility of unmanned air vehicles, the most prominent of which was the MQ-1 Predator. Fifty-four USAF personnel died in the Iraq War.

The USAF maintains a Combined Air & Space Operations Center in Qatar to direct air combat operations and Predator actions.

In March 2011, USAF jets bombed Libyan Armed Forces targets as part of the NATO-led international military intervention to enforce a United Nations resolution that imposed no-fly zone over the country and protected its people from the First Libyan Civil War that occurred when its dictator, Muammar Gaddafi suppressed the protests calling for the end of his regime. Protests were inspired by the Arab Spring revolutions in Tunisia and Egypt.

In the summer of 2014, President Barack Obama announced the return of US Forces to Iraq. The US Air Force is undertaking a significant humanitarian effort in order to assist Iraq's imperiled minority groups. When permission was later granted for USAF airstrikes, it was on condition that the types of aircraft not be announced so as to obscure which countries they were based in.

== 2010s ==
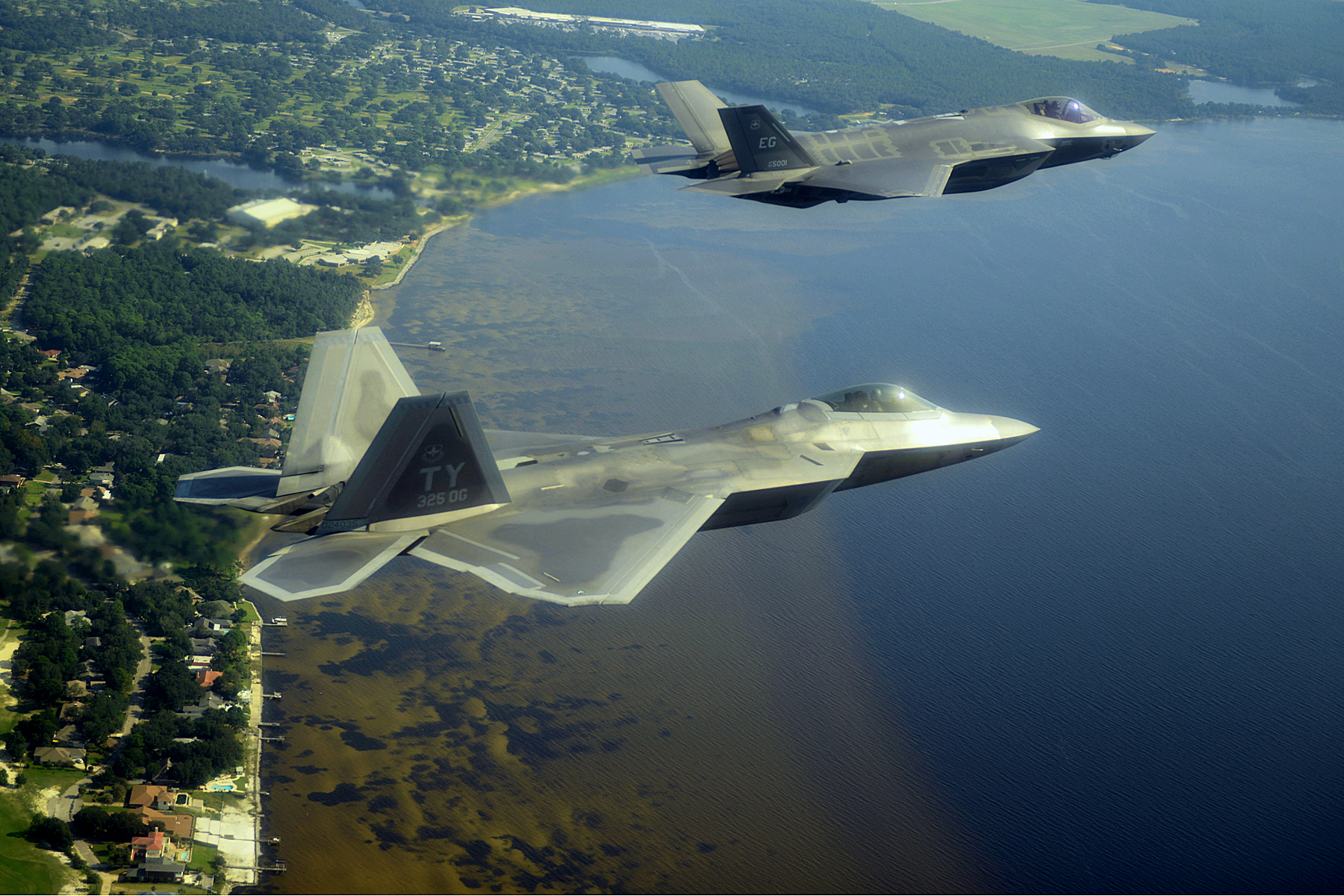
U.S. Air Force F-22A and F-35A over Florida's Emerald Coast

Today, the United States Air Force is the largest air force in the world, with about 5,778 manned aircraft in service, approximately 156 Unmanned Combat Air Vehicles, 2,130 Air-Launched Cruise Missiles, and 450 intercontinental ballistic missiles. The USAF has 328,439 personnel on active duty, 74,000 in the Selected and Individual Ready Reserves, and 106,000 in the Air National Guard. In addition, the Air Force employs 168,900 civilian personnel including indirect hire of foreign nationals. However, after two decades of failure to recapitalize its aircraft under Clinton and the two Bushes, the USAF has its oldest and most outdated fleet ever. Tactical aircraft purchases were put off while Fifth-generation jet fighters were facing delays, cost overruns and cutbacks and the programs to replace the 1950s bomber and tanker fleets have just been started over again after many aborted attempts.

An Air Force fighter pilot died February 20, 2008, after two F-15C jets collided during a training exercise over the Gulf of Mexico.

On February 29, 2008, the USAF announced the service had chosen Northrop Grumman over Boeing to replace its aging air refueling tanker fleet. This would become one of the largest military acquisition programs in U.S. history.

The pilot of an General Dynamics F-16 Fighting Falcon#F-16C/D fighter jet that crashed in a remote area about 80 miles northwest of Phoenix, Arizona, was killed when his plane went down on March 13, 2008. Rescuers could reach the site only by helicopter and arrived at daybreak March 15, 2008. There had been 17 other crashes of Luke Air Force Base F-16s since 1998, and only one of those resulted in a fatality. That crash happened in May 2004, when a pilot with the Republic of Singapore Air Force died after his jet went down during a training mission at an Air Force bombing range in southwest Arizona. The most recent crashes came in 2006. A pilot ejected safely from an F-16 in April 2006 after the lone engine on the jet exploded just after takeoff from the base. The aircraft came down in a cornfield.

=== The Taiwan Event ===
On June 5, 2008, Robert Gates announced the results of an investigation into the mistaken shipment of four MK-12 forward-section reentry vehicle assemblies to Taiwan. The investigation, conducted by Admiral Kirkland H. Donald, director of the US Naval Nuclear Propulsion Program, found that the Taiwan missile incident was, in Gates' words, "A degradation of the authority, standards of excellence, and technical competence within the nation's ICBM force. Similar to the bomber-specific August 2007 Minot-Barksdale nuclear weapons transfer incident, this incident took place within the larger environment of declining Air Force nuclear mission focus and performance" and that "the investigation identified commonalities between the August 2007 Minot incident and this [the Taiwan] event."

In his investigation report, Donald stated that the issues identified by his investigation were, "Indicative of an overall decline in Air Force nuclear weapons stewardship, a problem that has been identified but not effectively addressed for over a decade. Both the Minot-Barksdale nuclear weapons transfer incident and the Taiwan shipment, while different in specifics, have a common origin: the gradual erosion of nuclear standards and a lack of effective oversight by Air Force leadership"

As a result of the investigation, Gates announced that, "A substantial number of Air Force general officers and colonels have been identified as potentially subject to disciplinary measures, ranging from removal from command to letters of reprimand," and that he had accepted the resignations of USAF Secretary Michael Wynne and USAF Chief of Staff Michael Moseley. Gates added that he had asked James R. Schlesinger to lead a senior-level task force to recommend improvements in the stewardship and operation of nuclear weapons, delivery vehicles and sensitive components by the US DoD. Members of the task force came from the Defense Policy Board and the Defense Science Board.

In 2012, the USAF discovered that their billion dollar investment in the Expeditionary Combat Support System "has not yielded any significant military capability" and that it would take another billion dollar investment to gain even one quarter of the planned capability.

Also in 2012, the USAF received push back from the Congress over a plan to retire multiple reserve squadrons, leading to the formation of the National Commission on the Structure of the Air Force to resolve the proper balance between active and reserve air forces. This was followed in 2013 by the Total Force Task Force in an attempt to handle budget disagreements between the active and reserve forces.

In 2014, the USAF's 30 year strategy document cited a need for both low end and high end capabilities, and so called for cuts in high demand UAVs in favor of retaining "outdated fighter aircraft that would not be survivable in a high end conflict".

== See also ==
- National Museum of the United States Air Force
