= Rangrang Line =

Railway line in North Korea

Overview
- Native name: 락랑선 (樂浪線)
- Status: Operational
- Owner: Korean State Railway
- Locale: Ryŏkp'o-guyŏk, Rangrang-guyŏk; P'yŏngyang
- Termini: Ryŏkp'o; Rangrang
- Stations: 2

Service
- Type: Heavy rail, Freight rail

History
- Opened: 1989

Technical
- Line length: 10.2 km (6.3 mi)
- Number of tracks: Single track
- Track gauge: 1,435 mm (4 ft 8 1/2 in) standard gauge

- Rangrang Line
- Hangul: 락랑선
- Hanja: 樂浪線
- RR: Rangnangseon
- MR: Rangnangsŏn

The Rangrang Line is a non-electrified freight-only railway line of the Korean State Railway in Ryŏkp'o-guyŏk and Rangrang-guyŏk, P'yŏngyang, North Korea, running from Ryŏkp'o on the P'yŏngbu Line to Rangrang,

== History ==
The Rangrang Line was opened in 1989 to assist with the construction of the East P'yŏngyang Thermal Power Plant that began that year; since then, the line is used to supply the power plant with coal.

== Route ==
A yellow background in the "Distance" box indicates that section of the line is not electrified.

Distance (Total; km)	Distance (S2S; km)	Station Name (Transcribed)	Station Name (Chosŏn'gŭl (Hanja))	Connections
0.0	0.0	Ryŏkp'o	력포 (力浦)	P'yŏngbu Line
10.2	10.2	Rangrang	락랑 (樂浪)	
