= 中和 =

中和 may refer to:

- Chuwa Dam, a dam in Hokkaido, Japan
- Chunghwa station, a station in P'yŏngyang, North Korea
- Junghwa Station, a station in Seoul, South Korea
- King Chūwa (中和王), the last king of the First Shō dynasty, Ryukyu Kingdom
- Zhonghe District, district of New Taipei City, Taiwan
- Zhonghe Festival, a traditional Chinese festival
- Zhonghe line, a metro branch line of Zhonghe-Xinlu Line, Taipei Metro
- Zhonghe metro station, a station in New Taipei, Taiwan

== See also ==
- The dictionary definition of 中 at Wiktionary
- The dictionary definition of 和 at Wiktionary
