= ECSS =

ECSS may refer to:

- European College of Sport Science, Cologne, Germany
- European Cooperation for Space Standardization, Noordwijk, The Netherlands
- Escambia County School System
- Enterprise Communications Support Services, an initiative of the FAA. ECSS-SB is ECSS for Small Business.
- Estuarine, Coastal and Shelf Science, an academic journal on ocean sciences
- Expeditionary Combat Support System, a failed enterprise resource planning software project undertaken by the United States Air Force (USAF) between 2005 and 2012
- Exalted Carrier Single Sideband: Single sideband reception with added tunable level-enhanced carrier before the demodulator during radio reception of an amplitude-modulated station.
