= Kindung station =

Railway station in North Korea

Coordinates: 38.7414°N 125.7778°E

Kindŭng 긴등

Korean name
- Hangul: 긴등역
- Hanja: 긴登驛
- Revised Romanization: Gindeung-yeok
- McCune–Reischauer: Kindŭng-yŏk

General information
- Location: Ryonggung-ri, Hwangju County, North Hwanghae Province; North Korea
- Owner: Korean State Railway

History
- Opened: 1906

Services
Preceding station	Korean State Railway	Following station
Hŭkkyo towards P'yŏngyang	P'yŏngbu Line	Hwangju towards Kaesŏng
Location

Kindŭng station is a railway station in Ryonggung-ri, Hwangju County, North Hwanghae Province, North Korea. It is on located on the P'yŏngbu Line, which was formed from part of the Kyŏngŭi Line to accommodate the shift of the capital from Seoul to P'yŏngyang; though this line physically connects P'yŏngyang to Pusan via Dorasan, in operational reality it ends at Kaesŏng due to the Korean Demilitarized Zone.
