= Bombing of North Korea =

Aspect of the Korean War

- Part of the Korean War
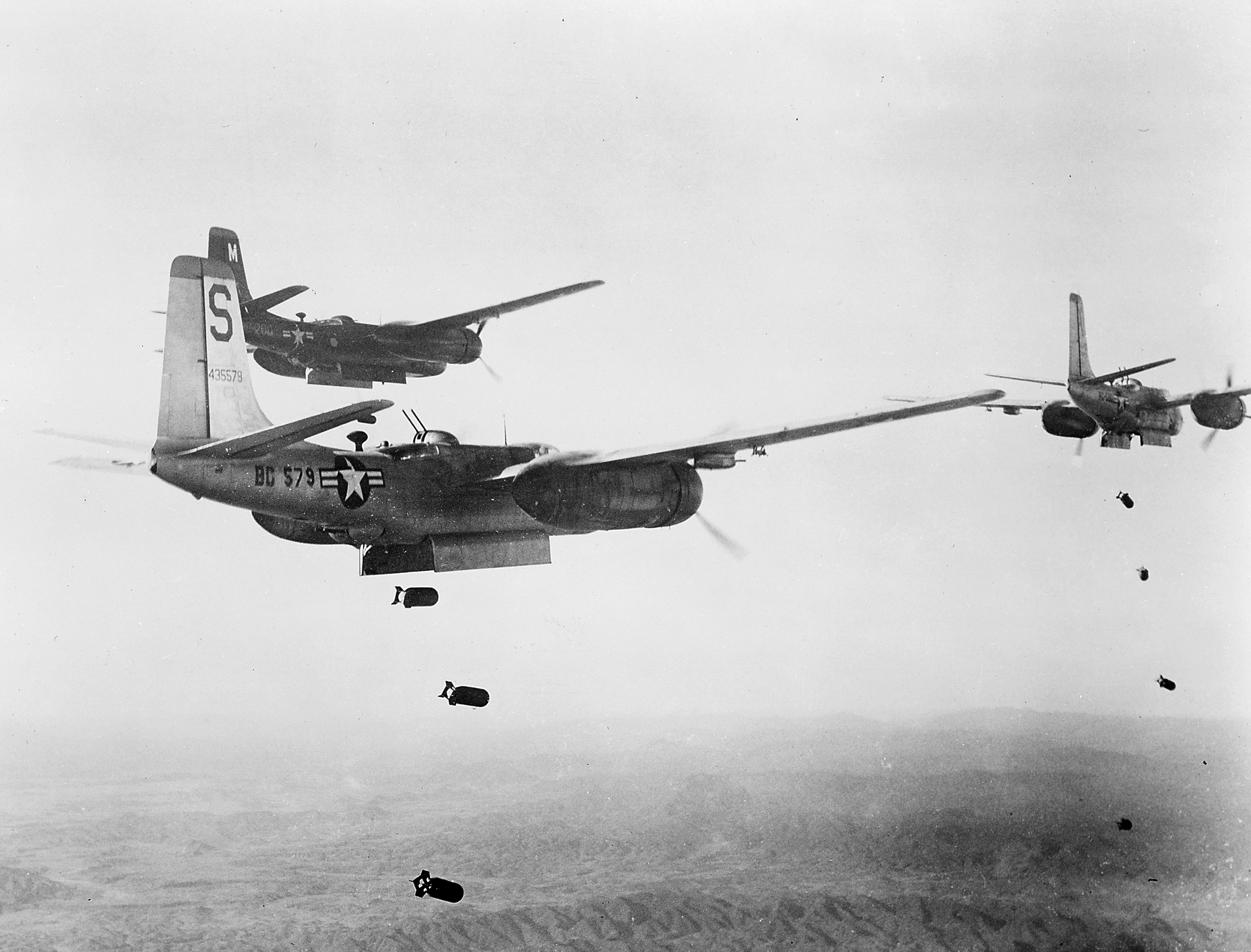
- Douglas A-26 Invaders releasing bombs over North Korea, 18 October 1951
- Type: Strategic bombing
- Location: North Korea
- Commanded by: United Nations Command
- Date: 1950–1953
- Casualties: 282,000 killed (Soviet estimate)

Following the North Korean invasion of South Korea in June 1950, the United States Air Force (USAF), under the auspices of the United Nations Command (UNC), began an extensive bombing campaign against North Korea that lasted until the end of the Korean War in July 1953. It was the first major bombing campaign for the USAF since its inception in 1947.

During the campaign, conventional weapons including explosives, incendiary bombs, and napalm were used to destroy nearly all of North Korea’s villages, towns, and cities. 18 out of North Korea’s 22 major cities were at least 50% destroyed. The U.S. dropped approximately 635,000 tons of bombs and 32,557 tons of napalm during the war, mostly on North Korea (compared to 503,000 tons in the entire Pacific theater in World War II). According to a Chosun Ilbo report in 2001, a report by the Soviet ambassador and chief military adviser to North Korea, Lt. Gen. V. N. Razuvaev, estimated 282,000 North Korean deaths due to the bombing campaign.

== Background ==
During the first several months of the Korean War, from June to September 1950, the North Korean Korean People's Army (KPA) succeeded in occupying most of the Korean Peninsula, rapidly routing U.S. and South Korean forces. On 15 September 1950, United Nations Command (UNC) forces reversed the situation by landing behind North Korean lines at Incheon and forcing the KPA to retreat to the north. The situation reversed again when Chinese People's Volunteer Army troops entered the conflict on 19 October, triggering a retreat by UN troops until early 1951.

For the entire duration of the war, areas on the border between Korea and China were excluded from bombing because of U.S. State Department concerns.

== Precision bombing campaign ==
Between June and October 1950, USAF Far East Air Force (FEAF) B-29 bombers carried out massive aerial attacks on transport centers and industrial hubs in North Korea. Having soon established air supremacy by the destruction of the Korean People's Army Air Force in the air and on the ground, FEAF bombers encountered no resistance and "the sky over North Korea was their safe front yard."

The first bombing attack on North Korea was approved on the fourth day of the war, 29 June 1950, by General Douglas MacArthur immediately upon request by FEAF's commander General George E. Stratemeyer. MacArthur's order preceded the receipt of an order of President Harry S. Truman to expand air operations into North Korean areas, also issued on 29 June but not received in Tokyo until 30 June.

During this period, the official U.S. policy was to pursue precision bombing aimed at communication centers (railroad stations, marshalling yards, main yards, and railways) and industrial facilities deemed vital to war-making capacity. The policy was the result of debates after World War II, in which U.S. policy rejected the mass civilian bombings that had been conducted in the later stages of the war as unproductive and immoral.

Despite the official precision bombing policy, North Korea reported extensive civilian casualties. According to military analyst Taewoo Kim, the apparent contradiction between a policy of precision bombing and reports of high civilian casualties is explained by the very low accuracy of bombing. According to a FEAF analysis, 209 bombs needed to be dropped in order to reach an 80% likelihood of hitting a 20 feet (6.1 m) by 500 feet (150 m) target. For such a target, 99.3% of bombs dropped did not hit the target. Since many targets of the "precision" campaign were located in populated areas, high numbers of civilians were killed despite the policy of limited targeting.

== Firebombing campaign ==
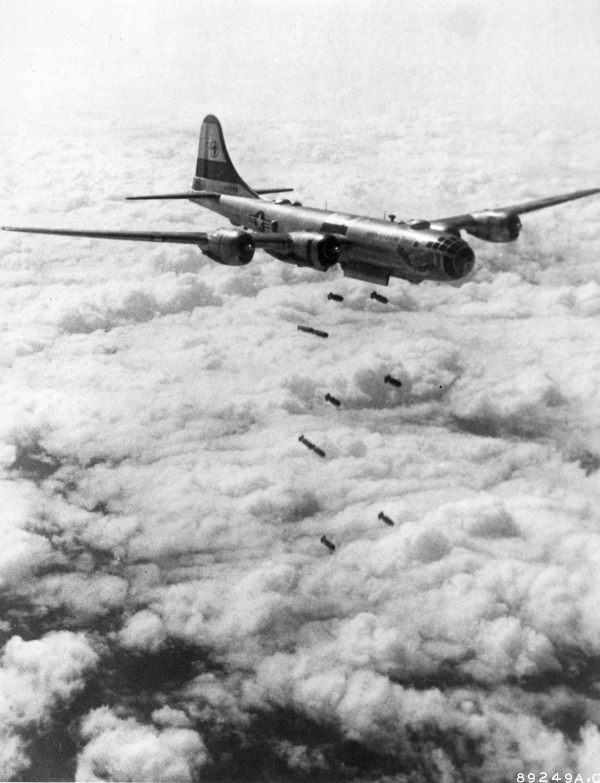
A B-29 dropping 1,000 lb (450 kg) bombs over Korea, August 1951

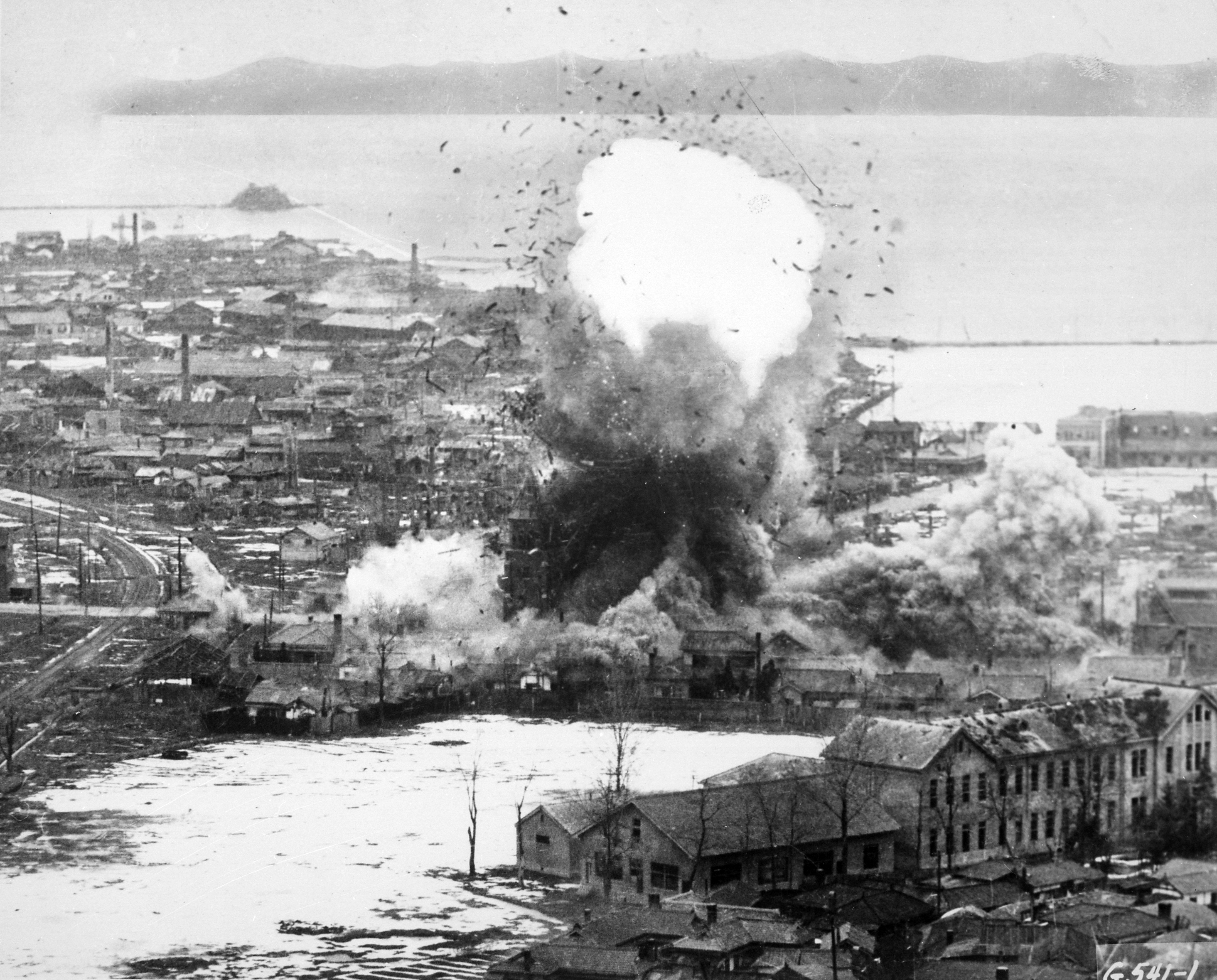
The North Korean city of Wonsan under attack by B-26 bombers from the Fifth Air Force, 1951

In early July 1950, General Emmett O'Donnell Jr. requested permission to incinerate five North Korean cities. He proposed that MacArthur announce that UN forces would employ the firebombing methods that "brought Japan to its knees" during the Pacific War. The announcement would warn the leaders of North Korea "to get women and children and other noncombatants the hell out." According to O'Donnell, MacArthur responded, "No...I'm not prepared to go that far yet. My instructions are very explicit; however, I want you to know that I have no compunction whatever to your bombing bona fide military objectives, with high explosives, in those five industrial centers. If you miss your target and kill people or destroy other parts of the city, I accept that as a part of war."

After Chinese intervention in the Korean War on the side of the North, "the U.N. Command adopted a policy of the purposeful destruction of [North Korean] cities in enemy hands."

Fraught with a rapidly evolving frontline, conflicting information, and green troops as UN forces retreated, FEAF's rearguard actions in July would also see the bombing of South Korean targets in Seoul and Andong, resulting in significant civilian deaths such as those at Yongsan. In September 1950, MacArthur said in his public report to the United Nations, "The problem of avoiding the killing of innocent civilians and damages to the civilian economy is continually present and given my personal attention."

In October 1950, Stratemeyer requested permission to attack Sinuiju, a provincial capital with an estimated population of 60,000, "over the widest area of the city, without warning, by burning and high explosive." MacArthur's headquarters responded the following day: "The general policy enunciated from Washington negates such an attack unless the military situation clearly requires it. Under present circumstances this is not the case."

Following the intervention of the Chinese in November, MacArthur ordered increased bombing on North Korea, which included firebombing against the country's arsenals and communications centers and especially against the "Korean end" of all the bridges across the Yalu River.

On November 3, 1950, Stratemeyer forwarded to MacArthur the request of Fifth Air Force commander General Earle E. Partridge for clearance to "burn Sinuiju." As he had done previously in July and October, MacArthur denied the request, explaining that he planned to use the town's facilities after seizing it. However, at the same meeting, MacArthur agreed for the first time to a firebombing campaign, agreeing to Stratemeyer's request to burn Kanggye and several other towns: "Burn it if you so desire. Not only that, Strat, but burn and destroy as a lesson to any other of those towns that you consider of military value to the enemy." The same evening, MacArthur's chief of staff told Stratemeyer that the firebombing of Sinuiju had also been approved. In his diary, Stratemeyer summarized the instructions as follows: "Every installation, facility, and village in North Korea now becomes a military and tactical target."

Stratemeyer sent orders to the Fifth Air Force and Bomber Command to "destroy every means of communications and every installation, factory, city, and village." On November 5, Stratemeyer gave the following order to the commanding general of the Fifth Air Force: "Aircraft under Fifth Air Force control will destroy all other targets including all buildings capable of affording shelter." The same day, 22 B-29s attacked Kanggye, destroying 75% of the city.

By the fall of 1951, the US Air Force was "advertising the destruction of more than 4,000 buildings a month and over a 145,000 since the beginning of the war."

After MacArthur was removed as UN Supreme Commander in Korea in April 1951, his successors continued this policy and ultimately extended it to all of North Korea.

=== American assessments ===
In the wake of the Kanggye attack, the FEAF began an intensive firebombing campaign that quickly incinerated multiple Korean cities. Three weeks after the attacks began, the U.S. Air Force assessed the damage of cities in North Korea as follows:

- Ch'osan – 85%
- Hoeryong (Hoeryŏng) – 90%
- Huichon (Hŭich'ŏn) – 75%
- Kanggye – 75%
- Kointong – 90%
- Manp'ochin – 95%
- Namsi – 90%
- Sakchu – 75%
- Sinuiju – 60%
- Uiju – 20%

On November 17, 1950, Douglas MacArthur told U.S. Ambassador to South Korea John J. Muccio: "Unfortunately, this area will be left a desert." By "this area," MacArthur meant the entire area between "our present positions and the border". On June 25, 1951, General O'Donnell, Commander of the Far Eastern Air Force (FEAF) Bomber Command, testified (in answer to a question from Senator John C. Stennis, "North Korea has been virtually destroyed, hasn't it?"): "Oh, yes; ...I would say that the entire, almost the entire Korean Peninsula is just a terrible mess. Everything is destroyed. There is nothing standing worthy of the name... Just before the Chinese came in we were grounded. There were no more targets in Korea."

In June 1952, as part of a strategy to maintain "air pressure" during the armistice negotiations, FEAF's Fifth Air Force selected 78 villages for destruction by B-26 light bombers. At the conclusion of the war, the U.S. Air Force assessed the damage and destruction of 22 major cities in North Korea as follows:

City	Percent estimated destruction
Anju	15%
Chinnampo (Namp'o)	80%
Chongju (Chŏngju)	60%
Haeju	75%
Hamhung (Hamhŭng)	80%
Hungnam (Hŭngnam)	85%
Hwangju (Hwangju County)	97%
Koindong	90%
Kunu-ri (Kunu-dong)	100%
Kyomipo (Songnim)	80%
Musan	5%
Najin (Rashin)	5%
Pyongyang	75%
Sariwon (Sariwŏn)	95%
Sinanju	100%
Songjin (Kimchaek)	50%
Sunan (Sunan-guyok)	90%
Unggi (Sonbong County)	5%
Wonsan (Wŏnsan)	80%

The bombing campaign destroyed almost every substantial building in North Korea. The war's highest-ranking U.S. POW, U.S. Major General William F. Dean, reported that the majority of North Korean cities and villages he saw were either rubble or snow-covered wasteland. Dean Rusk, the U.S. State Department official who headed East Asian affairs, concluded that America had bombed "everything that moved in North Korea, every brick standing on top of another." North Korean factories, schools, hospitals, and government offices were forced to move underground. In November 1950, the North Korean leadership instructed the population to build dugouts and mud huts and to dig tunnels, in order to solve the acute housing problem.

In an interview with U.S. Air Force historians in 1988, US Air Force General Curtis LeMay, who was also head of the U.S. Strategic Air Command, commented on efforts to win the war as a whole, including the strategic bombing campaign, saying "Right at the start of the war, unofficially, I slipped a message in "under the carpet" in the Pentagon that we ought to turn SAC lose with some incendiaries on some North Korean towns. The answer came back, under the carpet again, that there would be too many civilian casualties; we couldn't do anything like that. We went over there and fought the war and eventually burned down every town in North Korea anyway, some way or another, and some in South Korea, too… Over a period of three years or so we killed off, what, 20 percent of the population of Korea, as direct casualties of war or from starvation and exposure? Over a period of three years, this seemed to be acceptable to everybody, but to kill a few people at the start right away, no, we can't seem to stomach that".

Pyongyang, which saw 75% of its area destroyed, was so devastated that bombing was halted as there were no longer any worthy targets. By the end of the campaign, US bombers had difficulty in finding targets and were reduced to bombing footbridges or jettisoning their bombs into the sea.

=== International assessments ===
In May 1951, an international fact finding team from East Germany, West Germany, China, and the Netherlands stated, "The members, in the whole course of their journey, did not see one town that had not been destroyed, and there were very few undamaged villages."

British Prime Minister Winston Churchill privately criticized the American use of napalm, writing that it was "very cruel", as U.S. forces were "splashing it all over the civilian population", "tortur[ing] great masses of people". He conveyed these sentiments to U.S. Chairman of the Joint Chiefs of Staff Omar Bradley, who "never published the statement." Publicly, Churchill allowed Bradley "to issue a statement that confirmed UK support for U.S. napalm attacks."

In August 1951, war correspondent Tibor Meray stated that he had witnessed "a complete devastation between the Yalu River and the capital". He said that there were "no more cities in North Korea". He added, "My impression was that I am traveling on the moon because there was only devastation—every city was a collection of chimneys."

Public statements by the UN Command obfuscated the extent of the destruction of North Korean communities with euphemisms, for example by listing the destruction of thousands of individual "buildings" rather than towns or villages as such, or reporting attacks on North Korean supply centers located in a city with language suggesting that the entire city constituted a "supply center".

== Attacks on major dams ==
After running low on urban targets, U.S. bombers destroyed hydroelectric and irrigation dams in the later stages of the war, flooding farmland and destroying crops. The generating facilities of hydroelectric dams had been targeted previously in a series of mass air attacks starting in June 1952.

On May 13, 1953, 20 F-84s of the 58th Fighter Bomber Wing attacked the Toksan Dam, producing a flood that destroyed 700 buildings in Pyongyang and thousands of acres of rice. On May 15–16, two groups of F-84s attacked the Chasan Dam. The flood from the destruction of the Toksan Dam "scooped clean" 27 miles (43 km) of river valley. The attacks were followed by the bombing of the Kuwonga Dam, Namsi Dam, and Taechon Dam. The bombing of these 5 dams and ensuing floods threatened several million North Koreans with starvation; according to Charles K. Armstrong, "only emergency assistance from China, the USSR, and other socialist countries prevented widespread famine."

== Death toll ==
According to a Chosun Ilbo report in 2001, a report by Soviet ambassador and chief military adviser to North Korea, Lieutenant General V. N. Razuvaev, estimated 282,000 North Korean deaths in bombing raids during the war.

The Republic of Korea Ministry of Defense estimated total South Korean civilian casualties for the entire Korean War at 990,968, of which 373,599 (37.7%) were deaths. For North Korea, the ministry estimated 1,500,000 total civilian casualties, including deaths, injuries, and missing, but did not separately report the number of deaths. The ministry made no specific estimates for deaths from the UN air campaign.

Historian Charles K. Armstrong estimated that 12%–15% of the North Korean population (c. 10 million) was killed in the war, or approximately 1.2 million to 1.5 million people. Armstrong did not separately determine how many of these deaths were among civilians or caused by the UN Command's air campaign. Estimates of North Korean military deaths range from a U.S. Department of Defense estimate of 214,899 to a Correlates of War estimate of 316,579, according to the Peace Research Institute Oslo Battle Deaths Dataset.

In a 1988 interview, US Air Force General Curtis LeMay stated that about 20% of the North Korea's population had died during the war, including the UN air campaign, stating that: "Over a period of three years or so we killed off, what, 20% of the population of Korea, as direct casualties of war or from starvation and exposure?"

== Legacy ==
In the end, the scale of destruction exceeded that in Germany and Japan, according to U.S. Air Force estimates. A total of 635,000 tons of bombs, in addition to 32,557 tons of napalm, were dropped in Korea during the war by the United States. By comparison, the United States dropped an estimated 503,000 tons in the entire Pacific theater during World War II (including 160,000 on Japan). Whereas 60 Japanese cities were destroyed to an average of 43% in World War II, estimates of the destruction of towns and cities in North Korea "ranged from forty to ninety percent"; at least 50% of 18 out of 22 of North Korea’s major cities were obliterated. North Korea ranks alongside Cambodia (500,000 tons), North Vietnam (1 million tons), Laos (2 million tons), and South Vietnam (4 million tons) as among the most heavily bombed countries in history.

Armstrong states that the bombing had a profound, long-lasting impact on North Korea's subsequent development and the attitudes of the North Korean people, which "cannot be overestimated":

Russian accusations of indiscriminate attacks on civilian targets did not register with the Americans at all. But for the North Koreans, living in fear of B-29 attacks for nearly three years, including the possibility of atomic bombs, the American air war left a deep and lasting impression. The DPRK government never forgot the lesson of North Korea's vulnerability to American air attack, and for half a century after the Armistice continued to strengthen anti-aircraft defenses, build underground installations, and eventually develop nuclear weapons to ensure that North Korea would not find itself in such a position again. …The war against the United States, more than any other single factor, gave North Koreans a collective sense of anxiety and fear of outside threats that would continue long after the war's end.

Sahr Conway-Lanz, who holds a Ph.D. in the history of American foreign relations from Harvard University, has written extensively about the legacy and impact on American discourse on the international norm of noncombatant immunity. He has stated: "During the war, American military and civilian officials stretched the term "military target" to include virtually all human-made structures, capitalizing on the vague distinction between the military and civilian segments of an enemy society. They came to apply the logic of total war to the destruction of the civil infrastructure in North Korea. Because almost any building could serve a military purpose, even if a minor one, nearly the entire physical infrastructure behind enemy lines was deemed a military target and open to attack. This expansive definition, along with the optimism about sparing civilians that is reinforced, worked to obscure in American awareness the suffering of Korean civilians in which U.S. firebombing was contributing."

In the eyes of North Koreans as well as some observers, the U.S.'s "deliberate targeting of civilian infrastructure which resulted in the destruction of cities and high civilian death count" was a war crime.

Bruce Cumings, a prominent U.S. historian of the Korean War, has stated, "What hardly any Americans know or remember is that we carpet-bombed the North for three years with next to no concern for civilian casualties." Cumings also described the U.S. air war on North Korea as "an application and elaboration of the air campaigns against Japan and Germany, except that North Korea was a small Third World country that lost control of the air to the United States within days of the war’s start." He has compared the American bombing to genocide.

After the war the Air Force convinced many that its saturation bombing forced the Communists to conclude the war. The Air Force general Otto Weyland determined that "the panic and civil disorder" created in the North by round-the-clock bombing was "the most compelling factor" in reaching the armistice. He was wrong, just as he had been in World War II, but that did not stop the air force from repeating the same mindless and purposeless destruction in Vietnam. Saturation bombing was not conclusive in either war—just unimaginably destructive.

Historian A. Dirk Moses cites the bombing campaign as an example of a military operation causing enormous loss of civilian life as "collateral damage", when the ultimate objective is military. He argues that such deaths escape scrutiny and are excused when genocide is upheld as the ultimate evil.

== See also ==
- Domicide
- Urbicide
