= Rangrang station =

Railway station in Pyongyang, North Korea

Rangrang 락랑

Korean name
- Hangul: 락랑역
- Hanja: 樂浪驛
- Revised Romanization: Nangnang-yeok
- McCune–Reischauer: Rangrang-yŏk

General information
- Location: Kin'gol-li, Rangrang-guyŏk, P'yŏngyang; North Korea
- Owner: Korean State Railway
- Connections: Tram Line 2 Tram Line 3

History
- Opened: 1989

Services
| Preceding station | Korean State Railway | Following station |
|---|---|---|
| Terminus | Rangrang Line | Ryŏkp'o Terminus |
Location

Rangrang station is a railway station in Kin'gol-li, Rangrang-guyŏk, P'yŏngyang, North Korea. It is the terminus of the Rangrang Line of the Korean State Railway, which connects to the mainline at Ryŏkp'o.

The station, opened in 1989, is used to supply coal to the East P'yŏngyang Thermal Power Plant, whose construction was started in the same year.
