= Hukkyo station =

Railway station in North Korea

Coordinates: 38°48′0″N 125°47′26″E

Hŭkkyo 흑교

Korean name
- Hangul: 흑교역
- Hanja: 黑橋驛
- Revised Romanization: Heukgyo-yeok
- McCune–Reischauer: Hŭkkyo-yŏk

General information
- Location: Hŭkkyo-ri, Hwangju County, North Hwanghae Province; North Korea
- Owner: Korean State Railway

History
- Opened: 1906

Services
Preceding station	Korean State Railway	Following station
Chunghwa towards P'yŏngyang	P'yŏngbu Line	Kindŭng towards Kaesŏng
Location

Hŭkkyo station is a railway station located in Hŭkkyo-ri, Hwangju county, North Hwanghae province, North Korea. It is on located on the P'yŏngbu Line, which was formed from part of the Kyŏngŭi Line to accommodate the shift of the capital from Seoul to P'yŏngyang; though this line physically connects P'yŏngyang to Pusan via Dorasan, in operational reality it ends at Kaesŏng due to the Korean Demilitarized Zone.
