= Ryokpo station =

Railway station in North Korea

Coordinates: 38.9201°N 125.7758°E

Ryŏkp'o 력포

Korean name
- Hangul: 력포역
- Hanja: 力浦驛
- Revised Romanization: Ryeokpo-yeok
- McCune–Reischauer: Ryŏkp'o-yŏk

General information
- Location: Ryŏkp'o-guyŏk; P'yŏngyang; North Korea
- Owner: Korean State Railway

History
- Opened: 1906

Services
Preceding station	Korean State Railway	Following station
Taedonggang towards P'yŏngyang	P'yŏngbu Line	Chunghwa towards Kaesŏng
Rangrang Terminus	Rangrang Line	Terminus
Location

Ryŏkp'o station is a railway station located in Ryŏkp'o-guyŏk, P'yŏngyang, North Korea. It is on located on the P'yŏngbu Line; it is also the starting point of the Rangrang Line.
