= Hwangju station =

Railway station in North Korea

Hwangju 황주
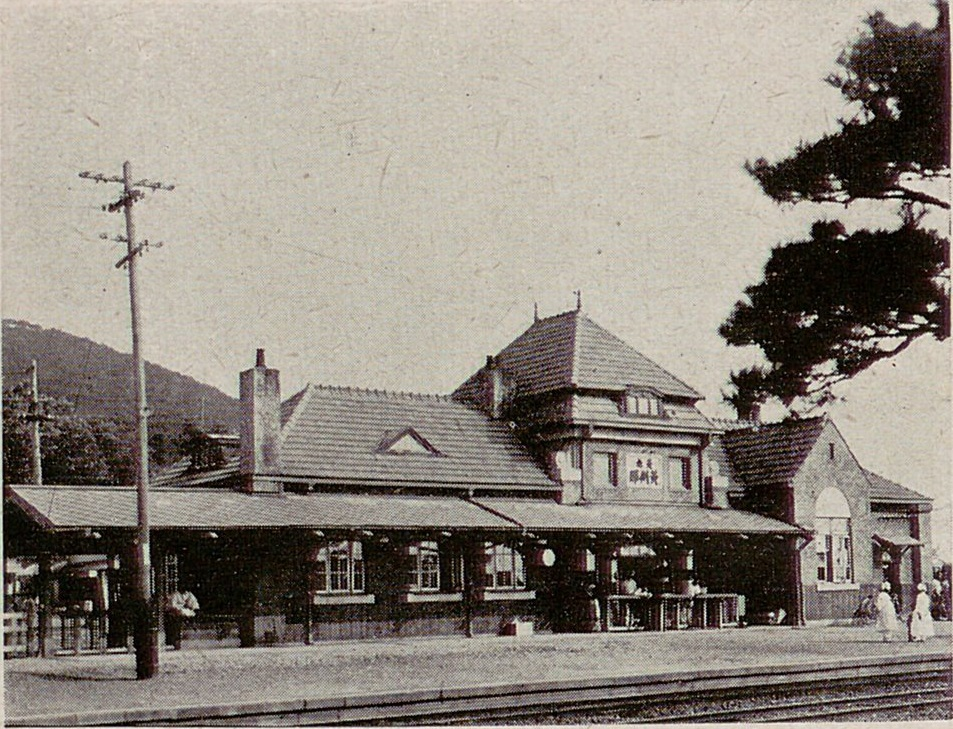

Korean name
- Hangul: 황주역
- Hanja: 黃州驛
- Revised Romanization: Hwangju-yeok
- McCune–Reischauer: Hwangju-yŏk

General information
- Location: Hwangju County, North Hwanghae Province; North Korea
- Coordinates: 38°41′40″N 125°45′38″E
- Owner: Korean State Railway

History
- Opened: 1905
- Former names: Hwanghae Hwangju
- Original company: Temporary Military Railway

Services
Preceding station	Korean State Railway	Following station
Kindŭng towards P'yŏngyang	P'yŏngbu Line	Ch'imch'on Ch'ŏngnyŏn towards Kaesŏng
Changch'ŏlli towards Songrim Ch'ŏngnyŏn	Songrim Line	Terminus
Location

Hwangju station is a railway station in Hwangju County, North Hwanghae Province, North Korea. It is the junction point of the P'yŏngbu Line, which runs from P'yŏngyang to Kaesŏng, and the Songrim Line, which begins at Hwangju and runs to Songrim.

The station, originally called Hwanghae Hwangju station, was opened by the Temporary Military Railway in 1905.
