= Bombing of Pyongyang =

1950–1953 bombing during the Korean War

The bombing of Pyongyang was conducted as part of a gradual and sustained United Nations Command aerial bombing of North Korea during the Korean War. The first bombing raid targeting Pyongyang occurred on 29 June 1950, four days after North Korea's invasion of South Korea. On 3 and 5 January 1951, 35 percent of Pyongyang was burned out by UN forces. By the time of the armistice in July 1953, 75 percent of Pyongyang's area had been destroyed.

== Air raids ==
Pyongyang in May 1951

After North Korea invaded South Korea on June 25, 1950, which sparked the conflict, General Douglas MacArthur, Commander-in-chief of the Far East Command, ordered the FEAF to carry out air raids on North Korea to prevent North Korean forces from overrunning the nation. Bad weather delayed further air actions until June 29 when MacArthur authorized FEAF attacks on airfields in North Korea. For the first time, B-26s of the 3rd Bombardment Group attacked Heijo airfield near Pyongyang, the North Korean capital, claiming up to 25 enemy aircraft destroyed on the ground.

Onjong-Ni Airfield was also attacked, resulting in the destruction of 2 Yak 3's and the damaging of 10 other aircraft on the ground. On 18 July 1950 aircraft from Task Force 77 attacked the Pyongyang airfields again destroying 14 aircraft and damaging 13.

Following the capture of Pyongyang on 19 October 1950 Heijo airfield was put into service by the UN forces, designated by the USAF as K-23.

UN forces abandoned the base on 5 December 1950 as part of the evacuation of Pyongyang in the face of the Chinese intervention. On 10 December 1950 B-29s bombed the airfield with high-explosive bombs.

The city was bombed on 3 and 5 January 1951, prompting a protest to the United Nations Security Council by the DPRK Foreign Minister.

On 23 January 1951, 46 F-80s of the 49th Fighter-Bomber Wing attacked anti-aircraft positions around Pyongyang and once this was completed 21 B-29s of the 19th and 307th Bombardment Groups from Okinawa bombed the airfield.

B-29's from the 98th Bombardment Group conducted two "maximum effort" incendiary attacks on Pyongyang in January 1951.

On July 21, 1951, Lt. Gen. Matthew Ridgway, having recently replaced General Douglas MacArthur as commander in chief, Far East and United Nations Command, informed the Joint Chiefs of Staff (JCS) that he planned "an all out air strike on Pyongyang" with 140 bombers and 230 fighters, to be take place on the first clear night after July 24. Under the proposal, warning flyers would be dropped in advance of the attack. The Joint Chiefs of Staff ordered Ridgway to defer the attack pending further instructions, due to concerns about the political implications. In response to concerns from JCS that flyers would place "undue importance" on the capital, Ridgway submitted an amended plan that omitted flyering the city in advance of the bombing. The all-out attack was conducted on July 30, but poor weather interfered with its effectiveness. On August 14, a second attempt was made with cloudy weather again interfering with effectiveness.

On July 11, 1952, a large attack known as Pressure Pump was conducted on the city involving 1,254 sorties from Fifth Air Force, Marine, Navy, Korean, Australian, South African, and British aircraft flying in the day, and 54 B-29s flying at night. The attack was preceded by flyers warning civilians to leave the city. On August 29, operation All United Nations Air Effort bombed the city again with 1,400 sorties.

According to a bomb assessment conducted by the U.S. Air Force, over the course of the war 75 percent of the buildings in Pyongyang was destroyed by the U.S. bombing, placing it approximately at the midpoint in level of damage, relative to other Korean cities:

- Musan – 5%
- Najin (Rashin) – 5%
- Unggi (Sonbong County) – 5%
- Anju – 15%
- Sinuiju – 50%
- Songjin (Kimchaek) – 50%
- Chongju (Chŏngju) – 60%
- Kanggye – 60% (reduced from previous estimate of 75%)
- Haeju – 75%
- Pyongyang – 75%
- Kyomipo (Songnim) – 80%
- Hamhung (Hamhŭng) – 80%
- Chinnampo (Namp'o) – 80%
- Wonsan (Wŏnsan) – 80%
- Hungnam (Hŭngnam) – 85%
- Sunan (Sunan-guyok) – 90%
- Sariwon (Sariwŏn) – 95%
- Hwangju (Hwangju County) – 97%
- Kunu-ri (Kunu-dong) – 100%
- Sinanju – 100%

== See also ==
- Korean War
- Bombing of North Korea
- Sinchon Museum of American War Atrocities
