= Andrea Alfaro =

American New Zealand aquaculture and marine ecology academic

- Education: University of Auckland
- Scientific career
- Fields: aquaculture, coastal ecology
- Workplaces: Auckland University of Technology, Fiji National University
- Thesis: Ecological dynamics of the green-lipped mussel, Perna canaliculus, at Ninety Mile Beach, northern New Zealand (2001)
- Academic advisors: Andrew Jeffs and Bob Creese

Andrea Casandra Alfaro is an American-New Zealand aquaculture and marine ecology academic. She is currently a full professor at the Auckland University of Technology.

== Academic career ==
After a 2001 PhD at the University of Auckland titled 'Ecological dynamics of the green-lipped mussel, Perna canaliculus, at Ninety Mile Beach, northern New Zealand,' Alfaro moved to Auckland University of Technology, rising to full professor. Much of her research is related to the Perna canaliculus New Zealand green-lipped mussel, an important species in New Zealand aquaculture industry, but she has projects throughout the Pacific, including many with students from the Fiji National University.

== Business career ==
Alfaro is also a director of Bluff Ltd, a company reestablishing pāua farming in Bluff. She also provides the company with scientific advice.

== Selected works ==
- Alfaro, Andrea C., François Thomas, Luce Sergent, and Mark Duxbury. "Identification of trophic interactions within an estuarine food web (northern New Zealand) using fatty acid biomarkers and stable isotopes." Estuarine, Coastal and Shelf Science 70, no. 1-2 (2006): 271–286.
- Alfaro, Andrea C. "Benthic macro-invertebrate community composition within a mangrove/seagrass estuary in northern New Zealand." Estuarine, Coastal and Shelf Science 66, no. 1-2 (2006): 97–110.
- Alfaro, Andrea C., Andrew G. Jeffs, and Robert G. Creese. "Bottom-drifting algal/mussel spat associations along a sandy coastal region in northern New Zealand." Aquaculture 241, no. 1-4 (2004): 269–290.
- Campbell, Kathleen A., Campbell S. Nelson, Andrea C. Alfaro, Sheree Boyd, Jens Greinert, Stephanie Nyman, Emmanuelle Grosjean et al. "Geological imprint of methane seepage on the seabed and biota of the convergent Hikurangi Margin, New Zealand: Box core and grab carbonate results." Marine Geology 272, no. 1-4 (2010): 285–306.
