= Kangnam County =

Coordinates: 38.9035°N 125.6486°E

Kangnam County 강남군
- County

Korean transcription(s)
  - Hangul: 강남군
  - Hanja: 江南郡
  - McCune-Reischauer: Kangnam-gun
  - Revised Romanization: Gangnam-gun
- Country: North Korea
- Direct-administered city: P'yŏngyang-Chikhalsi
- Administrative divisions: 1 up, 18 ri

Area
  - Total: 149.1 km^{2} (57.6 sq mi)

Population (2008)
  - Total: 69,279
  - Density: 464.6/km^{2} (1,203/sq mi)

Kangnam County is one of the two suburban counties of Pyongyang, North Korea. It is north-west of Songrim, north-east of Hwangju County, west of Chunghwa County, and south of Nakrang-guyok. It is the location of cooperative farms and smaller industrial complexes. It became part of Pyongyang in May 1963, when it was separated from South P'yŏngan. In 2010, it was administratively reassigned from Pyongyang to North Hwanghae; foreign media attributed the change as an attempt to relieve shortages in Pyongyang's food distribution system. However, it was returned to Pyongyang in 2011.

== Divisions ==
The county is divided into one town (up), and 18 'ri' (villages).

- Kangnam-up
  강남읍/江南邑
- Changgyo-ri
  장교리/長橋里
- Isan-ri
  이산리/二山里
- Kanchon-ri
  간천리/間川里
- Kochon-ri
  고천리/古川里
- Koup-ri
  고읍리/古邑里
- Majong-ri
  마정리/馬井里
- Munam-ri
  문암리/文岩里
- Ryonggok-ri
  룡곡리/龍谷里
- Ryonggyo-ri
  룡교리/龍橋里
- Ryongpo-ri
  룡포리/龍浦里
- Ryupo-ri
  류포리/柳浦里
- Sangam-ri
  상암리/上岩里
- Sinhung-ri
  신흥리/新興里
- Sinjong-ri
  신정리/新井里
- Sokho-ri
  석호리/石湖里
- Tanggok-ri
  당곡리/唐谷里
- Tongjong-ri
  동정리/東井里
- Yongjin-ri
  영진리/英進里
