= Chunghwa station =

Railway station in North Korea

Chunghwa 중화

Korean name
- Hangul: 중화역
- Hanja: 中和驛
- Revised Romanization: Junghwa-yeok
- McCune–Reischauer: Chunghwa-yŏk

General information
- Location: Chunghwa-ŭp, Chunghwa-gun, North Hwanghae Province; North Korea
- Coordinates: 38°51′26″N 125°47′18″E
- Owner: Korean State Railway

History
- Opened: 1906

Services
Preceding station	Korean State Railway	Following station
Ryŏkp'o towards P'yŏngyang	P'yŏngbu Line	Hŭkkyo towards Kaesŏng
Location

Chunghwa station is a passenger railway station in Chunghwa-ŭp, Chunghwa County, a suburban county of North Hwanghae Province, North Korea. It is on the P'yŏngbu Line, which was formed from part of the Kyŏngŭi Line to accommodate the shift of the capital from Seoul to P'yŏngyang. Though this line physically connects P'yŏngyang to Pusan via Torasan, in operational reality it ends at Kaesŏng due to the Korean Demilitarized Zone.
