= Songrim Line =

Railway line in North Korea

Overview
- Other name: Kyŏmip'o Line 겸이포선 (兼二浦線)
- Native name: 송림선 (松林線)
- Status: Operational
- Owner: Korean State Railway
- Locale: North Hwanghae
- Termini: Hwangju; Songrim Ch'ŏngnyŏn
- Stations: 4 (incl. Songrim Hwamul)

Service
- Type: Heavy rail, Passenger & freight rail Regional rail
- Operator(s): Korean State Railway

History
- Opened: 1 April 1908

Technical
- Line length: 14.2 km (8.8 mi)
- Number of tracks: Single track
- Track gauge: 1,435 mm (4 ft 8 1/2 in) standard gauge
- Electrification: 3000 V DC Overhead line Hwangju-Changch'ŏlli
Route map
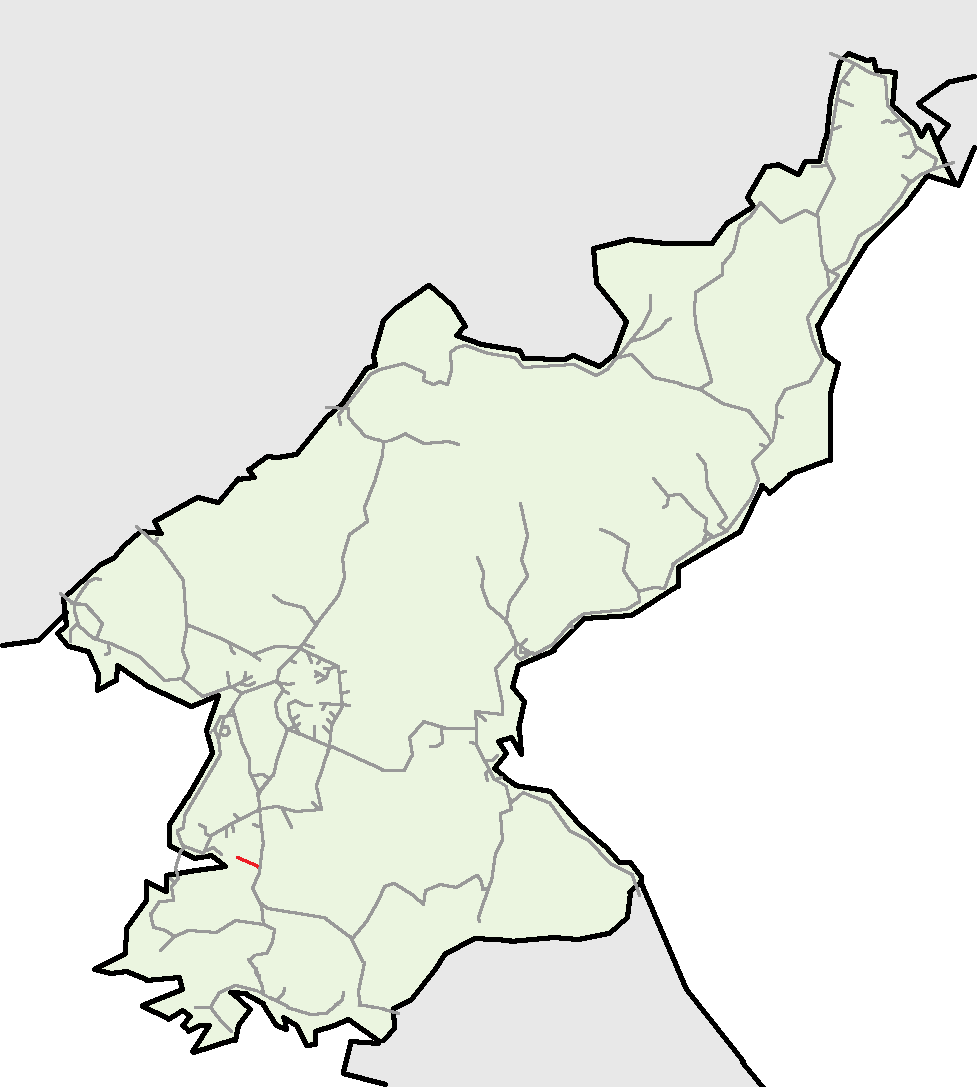

- Songrim Line
- Hangul: 송림선
- Hanja: 松林線
- RR: Songnimseon
- MR: Songnimsŏn

The Songrim Line is a partially electrified standard-gauge secondary line of the Korean State Railway in South Hwanghae Province, North Korea, running from Hwangju on the P'yŏngbu Line to Songrim.

The line continues past Songrim Ch'ŏngnyŏn Station to the freight-only Songrim Hwamul Station and the Hwanghae Iron & Steel Complex.

== History ==
Originally built by the Chosen Government Railway (Sentetsu) as the Kyŏmip'o Line (겸이포선, 兼二浦線), construction was completed in November 1905, and revenue operations began on 1 April 1908. Changch'ŏlli Station was opened by Sentetsu on 5 December 1915. Originally built to serve the Mitsubishi Iron Foundry (called the Hwanghae Iron & Steel Complex since 1945), in 1920 there was one daily round-trip through train between P'yŏngyang and Kyŏmip'o, along with five daily round-trip local trains (second and third class only) between Hwangju and Kyŏmip'o.

After the defeat of Japan in the Pacific War and the subsequent partition of Korea, the entirety of the line, being north of the 38th parallel, was located in the Soviet zone of occupation; on 10 August 1946, the Provisional People's Committee for North Korea nationalised all railways within its jurisdiction, including the Songrim Line, and it has since been operated by the Korean State Railway.

== Route ==
A yellow background in the "Distance" box indicates that section of the line is not electrified.

Distance (km)		Station Name		Former Name		
Total	S2S	Transcribed	Chosŏn'gŭl (Hanja)	Transcribed	Chosŏn'gŭl (Hanja)	Connections
0.0	0.0	Hwangju	황주	Hwanghae Hwangju	황해 (黃海黃州)	P'yŏngbu Line
6.7	6.7	Changch'ŏlli	장천리 (長川里)			
11.3	4.6	Songrim Ch'ŏngnyŏn	송림 청년 (松林靑年)	Kyŏmip'o	겸이포 (兼二浦)	
14.2	1.1	Songrim Hwamul	송림 화물 (松林貨物)			
