= Chuwa Dam =

Dam in Hokkaido Prefecture, Japan

- Location within Japan
- Interactive map of Chuwa Dam
- Location: Hokkaido Prefecture, Japan
- Coordinates: 43°58′52″N 142°22′41″E
- Opening date: 1924

Dam and spillways
- Height: 23 m (75 ft)
- Length: 248 m (814 ft)

Reservoir
- Total capacity: 2132 thousand cubic meters
- Catchment area: sq. km
- Surface area: 21 hectares

Chuwa Dam (Japanese: 中和ダム) is an earthfill dam located in Hokkaido Prefecture in Japan. The dam is used for irrigation. The dam impounds about 21 ha of land when full and can store 2132 thousand cubic meters of water. The construction of the dam was completed in 1924.
