= Chunghwa County =

Chunghwa County 중화군
- County

Korean transcription(s)
  - Hanja: 中和郡
  - McCune-Reischauer: Chunghwa-gun
  - Revised Romanization: Junghwa-gun
- Interactive map of Chunghwa County
- Coordinates: 38°51′33″N 125°49′44″E
- Country: North Korea
- Province: North Hwanghae Province
- Administrative divisions: 1 up, 16 ri

Population (2008)
  - Total: 77,367

Chunghwa County is a county of North Hwanghae, formerly one of the four suburban counties of East Pyongyang, North Korea. It sits north of Hwangju-gun, North Hwanghae, east of Kangnam-gun, North Hwanghae, west of Sangwŏn-gun, North Hwanghae, and south of Ryŏkp'o-guyŏk (Ryokpo District), Pyongyang. It became part of Pyongyang in May 1963, when it separated from South P'yŏngan Province. Chunghwa-gun is the location of a few historic sights (both Revolutionary and pre-Japanese occupation), such as the Chunghwa Hyanggyo, as well as a few KPA weapons units. In 2010, it was administratively reassigned from Pyongyang to North Hwanghae; foreign media attributed the change as an attempt to relieve shortages in Pyongyang's food distribution system.

== Administrative divisions ==
The county is divided into one town (ŭp), and 16 'ri' (villages).

- Chunghwa-ŭp
  중화읍/中和邑
- Chaesong-ri
  채송리/蔡松里
- Changsal-li
  장산리/長山里
- Chingwang-ri
  진광리/鎭廣里
- Chungryong-ri
  충룡리/忠龍里
- Kŏnsal-li
  건산리/乾山里
- Kŭmsal-li
  금산리/金山里
- Kwanbong-ri
  관봉리/館峰里
- Majang-ri
  마장리/馬場里
- Multong-ri
  물동리/물동里
- Myŏngwŏl-ri
  명월리/明月里
- Ŏryong-ri
  어룡리/魚龍里
- Paeg'ul-li
  백운리/白雲里
- Ryongsan-ri
  룡산리/龍山里
- Samhŭng-ri
  삼흥리/三興里
- Samsŏng-ri
  삼성리/三姓里
- Tongsal-li
  동산리/東山里
