= Rangrang-guyok =

Coordinates: 38°57′36″N 125°41′24″E

Rangrang-guyŏk
- Kuyok of Pyongyang

Korean transcription(s)
  - Hangul: 락랑구역
  - Hanja: 樂浪區域
  - Revised Romanization: Nangnang-guyeok
  - McCune–Reischauer: Rangrang-guyŏk
- Location of Rangrang-guyok within Pyongyang
- Country: North Korea
- Direct-administered city: P'yŏngyang-Chikhalsi
- Administrative divisions: 9 dong, 9 ri

Government
  - Representative representing the district in the Supreme People's Assembly: Kim Yong-nam (since 2019)

Area
  - Total: 97 km^{2} (37 sq mi)

Population (2008)
  - Total: 282,681
  - Density: 2,900/km^{2} (7,500/sq mi)

Rangrang-guyŏk or Rangrang District is one of the 19 guyok which constitute the city of Pyongyang, North Korea. It is located south of the Taedong River, and is bordered to the north by Songyo-guyok, to the east by the Ryokpo-guyok, and to the south by Chunghwa and Kangnam counties.

== History ==
The Lelang Commandery (Rangrang) was, according to the Book of Han, composed of 27 districts and had a population of over 406,748 people. Located on the Taedong River at the approximate location of modern Pyongyang, archeological evidence suggests that the seat of the commandery had been established here at the site of Wanggeom-seong, the Old Chosŏn capital.

During the Japanese colonial period, the area was part of Taedong County. As Pyongyang grew and annexed many former parts of Taedong County, the area was later split up Pyongyang's Dong-guyok, Kangnam-gun, and Chunghwa-gun. Rangrang-guyok was officially created as a separate district in 1959.

The district is famous for the large number of Han and Koguryo tombs which litter the area, many of which were first discovered by the Japanese in the early 1910s (see Nakrang Tombs). Japanese archaeologists Torrii Ryuzo and Imanishi Ryu, in particular, were instrumental in the tomb excavations and in identifying the Nakrang Earthen Castle in Tosong-ri as the seat of the commandery. Over 1,500 tombs in all have been located, with sixty-three alone located in just one district (Chongbaek-dong). However, North Korea claims that all tombs are in fact of the Koguryo period, as it denies the existence of the Chinese settlement of Lelang, claiming it was a Koguryo city-state, and that the thousands of Chinese artifacts merely represent the burgeoning trade that the State of Nakrang had with the Han.

== Administrative divisions ==
Rangrang-guyok is divided into nine administrative districts known as tong, as well as nine villages ("ri"). The larger five tong (Chongbaek, Chongo, Kwanmun, Nakrang, and Tongil) are further divided in two parts for administrative purposes, which Chungsong-dong is divided into three.

	Chosŏn'gŭl	Hanja
Chŏngbaek-dong	정백동	貞栢洞
Chŏng'o-dong	정오동	貞梧洞
Ch'ungsŏng-dong	충성동	忠誠洞
Kwammun-dong	관문동	關門洞
Rangrang-dong	락랑동	樂浪洞
T'ongil-dong	통일동	統一洞
Tongsan-dong	동산동	東山洞
Tudan-dong	두단동	斗團洞
Wŏn'am-dong	원암동	猿岩洞
Chungdal-ri	중단리	中端里
Kin'gol-ri	긴골리	긴골里
Kŭmdae-ri	금대리	今大里
Namsa-ri	남사리	南寺里
Posŏng-ri	보성리	甫城里
Pyŏkchido-ri	벽지도리	碧只島里
Ryongho-ri	룡호리	龍湖里
Ryuso-ri	류소리	柳巢里
Songnam-ri	송남리	松南里
