= Expeditionary Combat Support System =

The Expeditionary Combat Support System (ECSS) was a failed enterprise resource planning software project undertaken by the United States Air Force (USAF) between 2005 and 2012. The goal of the project was to automate and streamline the USAF's logistics operations by, in part, consolidating and replacing over 200 separate legacy systems.

The project was undertaken to develop a single integrated enterprise resource planning system built using commercial off-the-shelf software, aimed at tracking all of its physical assets and making efficiency savings.

The purpose of the system was to enable the organisation to track all of its physical assets including airplanes, fuel, and even spare parts. The ECSS program was established through two main contracts. The first contract was with the database software company Oracle, to supply the commercial off-the-shelf (COTS) software. The second contract was with the Computer Science Corporation (CSC), to amalgamate the COTS software into the existing Air Force infrastructure.

After spending $1.1 billion on its development, the USAF concluded in 2012 that the system, "has not yielded any significant military capability" and estimated that, "it would require an additional $1.1B for about a quarter of the original scope to continue and fielding would not be until 2020." Based on that conclusion, the USAF canceled the program in November 2012. United States Senate Committee on Armed Services members Carl Levin and John McCain characterized the failed project as "one of the most egregious examples of mismanagement in recent memory."
