= Ryokpo-guyok =

Ryŏkp'o-guyŏk 력포구역
- Guyŏk of Pyongyang

Korean transcription(s)
  - Hanja: 力浦區域
  - McCune-Reischauer: Ryŏkp'o-guyŏk
  - Revised Romanization: Ryeokpoguyeok
- Location of Ryokpo-guyok within Pyongyang
- Coordinates: 38°56′N 125°50′E
- Country: North Korea
- Direct-administered city: P'yŏngyang-Chikhalsi

Area
  - Total: 122.6 km^{2} (47.3 sq mi)

Population (2008)
  - Total: 82,548
  - Density: 673.3/km^{2} (1,744/sq mi)

- Ryokpo-guyok
- Hangul: 력포구역
- Hanja: 力浦區域
- Revised Romanization: Ryeokpoguyeok
- McCune–Reischauer: Ryŏkp'o-guyŏk

Ryŏkp'o-guyŏk, or Ryŏkp'o District, is one of the 19 guyok which constitute the city of Pyongyang, North Korea. This is where part of the Goguryeo tombs of Pyongyang can be found.

== Etymology ==
The county name is after a village called Ryokpodong. There are multiple theories behind the name Ryokpo. One theory suggests that it resulted from a misreading of the original Chinese name Kompo (劍浦) which read the character Kom(劍) as ryok(力). The original name Kompo was said to be named because it was a spot where Kokuryo generals cleaned their swords in the creeks. Another theory suggests the name Ryokpo had an actual origin, because of an incident in the Joseon dynasty where the people used pure human force to block the incoming waters during high tide.

== History ==
The modern county was created in 1960 from the Rangrang-guyok and Sungho guyok (present day Sungho county). It merged some areas from Chunghwa County in 1965.

In the area is the Ryokpo Residence located which has reported as being used as a Winter Palace by the Supreme leader Kim Jong Un. In 2024 satellite images showed that several buildings of the complex had been demolished. It was unclear whether the buildings were undergoing renovation or permanent demolishment. Reports showed that leader Kim Jong Un had stayed at other residences. A military expert speculated that it could be part of a transfer of the residence to the military.

== Transport ==
Tongpyongyang station of the Pyongdok Line and .Ryŏkp'o station of the Pyongbu Line is located here.

== Administrative divisions ==
Ryŏkp'o-guyŏk is divided into 6 tong (neighbourhoods) and 6 ri (villages):

- Changjin 1-dong 장진 1동 (將進 1洞):It was named because it was thought to be the place where a Korean general followed the Japanese invaders to attack them during the Imjin War. It was originally called Jangjindong in 1896 but renamed to Jangjinri and Jangjongri until the 1960s.
- Changjin 2-dong 장진 2동 (將進 2洞): Same as what is described about Changjin 1-dong.
- Nŭnggŭm-dong 능금동(능금洞): named for its Nunggum trees (Chinese crab apple trees), was created in 1967 from Tangjongri (堂井里) and Ryokpodong.
- Seumul-ri 세우물리: Named after the three wells that existed in the Joseon dynasty, was created in 1967.
- Taehyŏn-dong 대현동 (大峴洞):The region was formed from a 1952 merge of Taejungri, Taphyunri,Hanganri and sokjongri subdivisions under Yulrimyeon of Chunghwa County.The region was named using the syllables of Taejungri and Taphyunri.The region was initially part of Sunghoguyok as Taehyunri but became part of Ryokpo as a dong in 1960.
- Ryŏkp'o-dong 력포동 (力浦洞)
- Sosin-dong 소신동 (小新洞)
- Ch'udang-ri 추당리 (楸唐里): created in 1952 from Chubinri (秋斌里) and Namdangri (藍溏里). It was briefly part of Sungho guyok in 1959.
- Ryongsal-ri 룡산리 (龍山里): The region was incorporated from Chunghwa County in 1965. Before 1989, the region was known as Mujin-ri, but changed its name to Ryongsal-ri(literally meaning dragon mountain) to reflect the fact that it has the tomb of the king Dongmyeong of Goguryeo in the mountain.It is also the region where the Jinpha-ri group of tombs are located as well as an ancient ruin of Jeongrungsa temple.
- Ryuhyŏl-ri 류현리 (柳絃里)
- Sosamjŏng-ri 소삼정리 (小三亭里):The division is named as such because it is made from a small region that was formerly part of region called Samjongri.
- Yang'ŭm-ri 양음리 (陽陰里)
