= Estuarine, Coastal and Shelf Science =

Peer-reviewed academic journal on ocean sciences

- Discipline: Ocean sciences
- Language: English
- Edited by: D. Baird, D.J. Burdige, M. Elliott, T. Jennerjahn, and S. Mitchell

Publication details
- Former names: Estuarine and Coastal Marine Science
- History: 1973–present
- Publisher: Elsevier on behalf of the Estuarine Coastal Sciences Association
- Open access: Hybrid
- License: CC BY 4.0 or CC BY-NC-ND 4.0
- Impact factor: 2.929 (2020)

Standard abbreviations
- ISO 4: Estuar. Coast. Shelf Sci.

Indexing
- CODEN: ECSSD3
- ISSN: 0272-7714 (print); 1096-0015 (web)
- OCLC no.: 6929198

Links
- Journal homepage; Online access

Estuarine, Coastal and Shelf Science is a peer-reviewed academic journal on ocean sciences, with a focus on coastal regions ranging from estuaries up to the edge of the continental shelf. It's published by Elsevier on behalf of the Estuarine Coastal Sciences Association and edited by T.S. Bianchi, M. Elliott, I. Valiela, and E. Wolanski. The journal began in 1973 as Estuarine and Coastal Marine Science before the name was changed in 1981. The journal is abstracted and indexed in the Science Citation Index, Scopus, PASCAL, Biosis, INSPEC, GEOBASE, and Academic Search Premier. According to the Journal Citation Reports, the journal has a 2020 impact factor of 2.929.
