= Hwangju County =

Hwangju County 황주군
- County

Korean transcription(s)
  - Hanja: 黃州郡
  - McCune-Reischauer: Hwangju-gun
  - Revised Romanization: Hwangju-gun
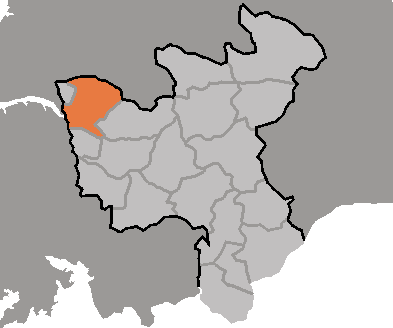
- Map of North Hwanghae showing the location of Hwangju
- Country: North Korea
- Province: North Hwanghae Province
- Administrative divisions: 1 ŭp, 28 ri

Population (2008)
  - Total: 155,215

Hwangju County is a county in North Hwanghae province, North Korea.

== Geography ==
Hwangju is bordered to the northwest by Sariwŏn, to the northeast by Songrim and Kangnam, to the southwest by Yŏnt'an, to the south by Pongsan, and to the southeast by Ŭnch'ŏn

== History ==
During the Joseon Dynasty, Hwangju was one of the most important cities in the area, leading to the first character of its name to be used in naming North Hwanghae Province. In 1930 its importance increased when Songrim, then a township of Hwangju County, was promoted to town status and renamed Kyomipo (Kenjiho in Japanese). There, the Japanese built a flourishing steel plant, which brought much prosperity to Hwangju. In 1947 Songrim was separated from Hwangju and made a city; since then, the county has been mostly agricultural. The old core of the city is still surrounded by its ancient walls. In April 2025 it was reported that a new prison is built in the county at 38°39′46″N 125°43′28″E.

== Climate ==
Kumchon had a fairly severe climate, with an average temperature of 10.2 degrees. Inland, the average January temperature is -7 degrees, while the average August temperature is 25.6 degrees. The county receives an average of 1,100mm of rain per year.

== Transportation ==
The county is served by the Pyongbu Railway Line, which stops in at Hwangju Station. There is also a highway which runs through Hwangju Town.

== Administrative divisions ==
The county is divided into one town (ŭp) and 14 villages (ri).

	Chosŏn'gŭl	Hancha
Hwangju-ŭp	황주읍	黃州邑
Changch'ŏl-li	장천리	長川里
Changsa-ri	장사리	長沙里
Ch'imch'ol-li	침촌리	沈村里
Ch'ŏldo-ri	철도리	鐵島里
Ch'ŏngryong-ri	청룡리	靑龍里
Ch'ŏngul-li	청운리	靑雲里
Ch'ŏnju-ri	천주리	天柱里
Hŭkkyo-ri	흑교리	黑橋里
Inp'o-ri	인포리	仁浦里
Koyŏl-li	고연리	高淵里
Kŭmsŏng-ri	금석리	金石里
Kup'o-ri	구포리	九浦里
Kwangch'ŏl-li	광천리	光川里
Naeoe-ri	내외리	內外里
Oesang-ri	외상리	外上里
P'onam-ri	포남리	浦南里
Ryongch'ŏl-li	룡천리	龍川里
Ryonggung-ri	룡궁리	龍宮里
Samhul-li	삼훈리	三勳里
Samjŏl-li	삼전리	三田里
Samjŏng-ri	삼정리	三井里
Sinsang-ri	신상리	新上里
Sokchŏng-ri	석정리	石井里
Sŏksal-li	석산리	石山里
Sŏnbong-ri	선봉리	仙峰里
Sunch'ŏl-li	순천리	順天里
Taedong-ri	대동리	大東里
Unsŏng-ri	운성리	雲城里

== See also ==
- Geography of North Korea
- Administrative divisions of North Korea
