= Songrim =

Songrim 송림시
- Municipal City

Korean transcription(s)
  - Chosŏn'gŭl: 송림시
  - Hancha: 松林市
  - McCune-Reischauer: Songnim-si
  - Revised Romanization: Songnim-si
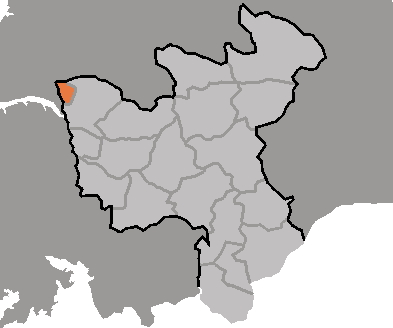
- Map of North Hwanghae showing the location of Songrim

- Location within North Korea
- Coordinates: 38.7542°N 125.645°E
- Country: North Korea
- Province: North Hwanghae Province
- Administrative divisions: 19 tong, 6 ri

Population (2008)
  - Total: 128,831
  - Dialect: Hwanghae
- Time zone: UTC+9 (Pyongyang Time)

Songrim (Korean pronunciation: [soŋ.ɾim]) is a city on the Taedong River in North Hwanghae Province, North Korea. It had a population of 128,831 in 2008.

== Administrative divisions ==
Songrim is divided into 19 tong (neighbourhoods) and 6 ri (villages):

- Chŏn-dong
- Ch'ŏlsan-dong
- Kkotp'in-dong
- Negil-dong
- Oryu-dong
- Saemaŭl-dong
- Saesallim 1-dong
- Saesallim 2-dong
- Saesallim 3-dong
- Saesallim 4-dong
- Samga-dong
- Sap'o 1-dong
- Sap'o 2-dong
- Sinhŭng-dong
- Sŏkt'ap-tong
- Songsan-dong
- Tongsong-dong
- Un'gok-tong
- Wŏlbong-dong
- Masal-li
- Sillyang-ri
- Sinsŏng-ri
- Sŏkt'al-li
- Sŏsong-ri
- Tangsal-li

== History ==
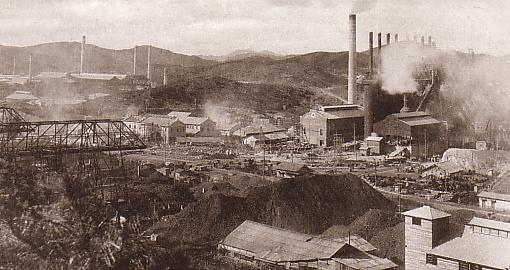
Mitsubishi iron works during the colonial period

The city was originally named Solme. Iron works began to be developed during the Japanese colonial period of Korea. Before Korean independence Songrim was known as Kyŏmip'o (Korean: 겸이포; Hanja: 兼二浦).

It was bombed during the Korean War, later it was rebuilt.

== Climate ==
Songrim has a humid continental climate (Köppen climate classification: Dwa).

Climate data for Songrim
Month	Jan	Feb	Mar	Apr	May	Jun	Jul	Aug	Sep	Oct	Nov	Dec	Year
Mean daily maximum °C (°F)	−0.5 (31.1)	1.7 (35.1)	7.6 (45.7)	15.7 (60.3)	21.6 (70.9)	25.9 (78.6)	28.2 (82.8)	28.4 (83.1)	24.4 (75.9)	18.3 (64.9)	9.6 (49.3)	1.4 (34.5)	15.2 (59.4)
Daily mean °C (°F)	−5.5 (22.1)	−3.4 (25.9)	2.7 (36.9)	9.9 (49.8)	15.9 (60.6)	20.7 (69.3)	24.2 (75.6)	24.2 (75.6)	19.5 (67.1)	12.5 (54.5)	4.6 (40.3)	−3.0 (26.6)	10.2 (50.4)
Mean daily minimum °C (°F)	−10.4 (13.3)	−8.4 (16.9)	−2.2 (28.0)	4.2 (39.6)	10.3 (50.5)	15.6 (60.1)	20.3 (68.5)	20.0 (68.0)	14.6 (58.3)	6.7 (44.1)	−0.4 (31.3)	−7.3 (18.9)	5.3 (41.5)
Average precipitation mm (inches)	12 (0.5)	15 (0.6)	25 (1.0)	37 (1.5)	79 (3.1)	101 (4.0)	292 (11.5)	190 (7.5)	102 (4.0)	38 (1.5)	39 (1.5)	17 (0.7)	947 (37.4)
Source: Climate-Data.org
