= Much'ang station =

Railway station in North Korea

Much'ang 무창
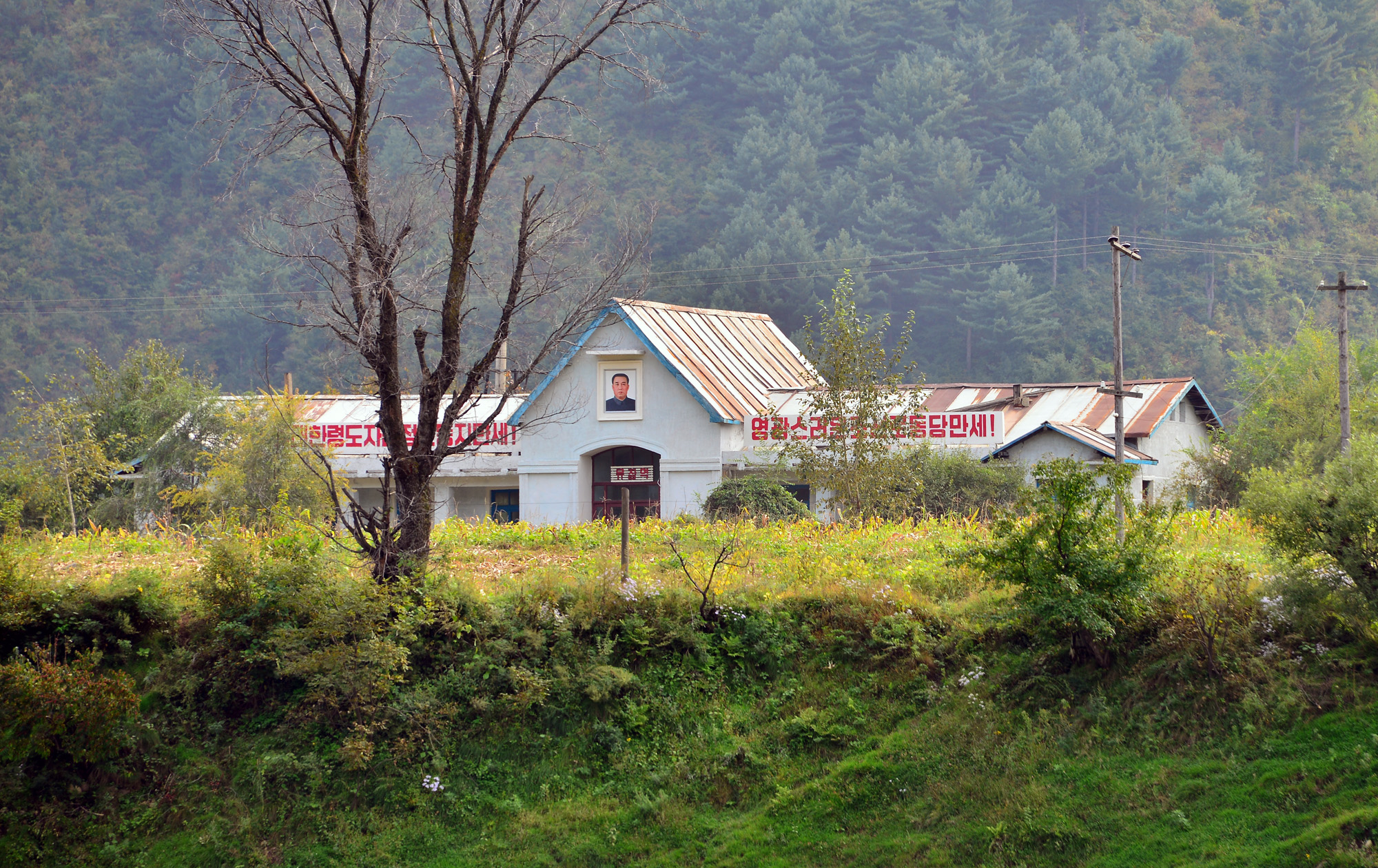
- Much'ang Station.

Korean name
- Hangul: 무창역
- Hanja: 茂昌驛
- Revised Romanization: Muchang-yeok
- McCune–Reischauer: Much'ang-yŏk

General information
- Location: Much'ang-ri, Kimhyŏngjik-kun, Ryanggang Province; North Korea
- Coordinates: 41.4759°N 127.3002°E
- Owner: Korean State Railway
- Line: Pukpu Line

History
- Opened: 3 August 1988

Services
Preceding station	Korean State Railway	Following station
P'op'yŏng Ch'ŏngnyŏn towards Manp'o Ch'ŏngnyŏn	Pukbunaeryuk Line	Rajuk towards Hyesan Ch'ŏngnyŏn
Location

Much'ang station is a railway station in Much'ang-ri, Kimhyŏngjik-kun, Ryanggang Province, North Korea, on the Pukpu Line of the Korean State Railway.

== History ==
The station was opened on 3 August 1988 by the Korean State Railway, along with the rest of the second section of the Pukpu Line between Chasŏng and Huju.
