= Sinpa Chongnyon station =

Railway station in North Korea

Sinp'a Ch'ŏngnyŏn 신파청년
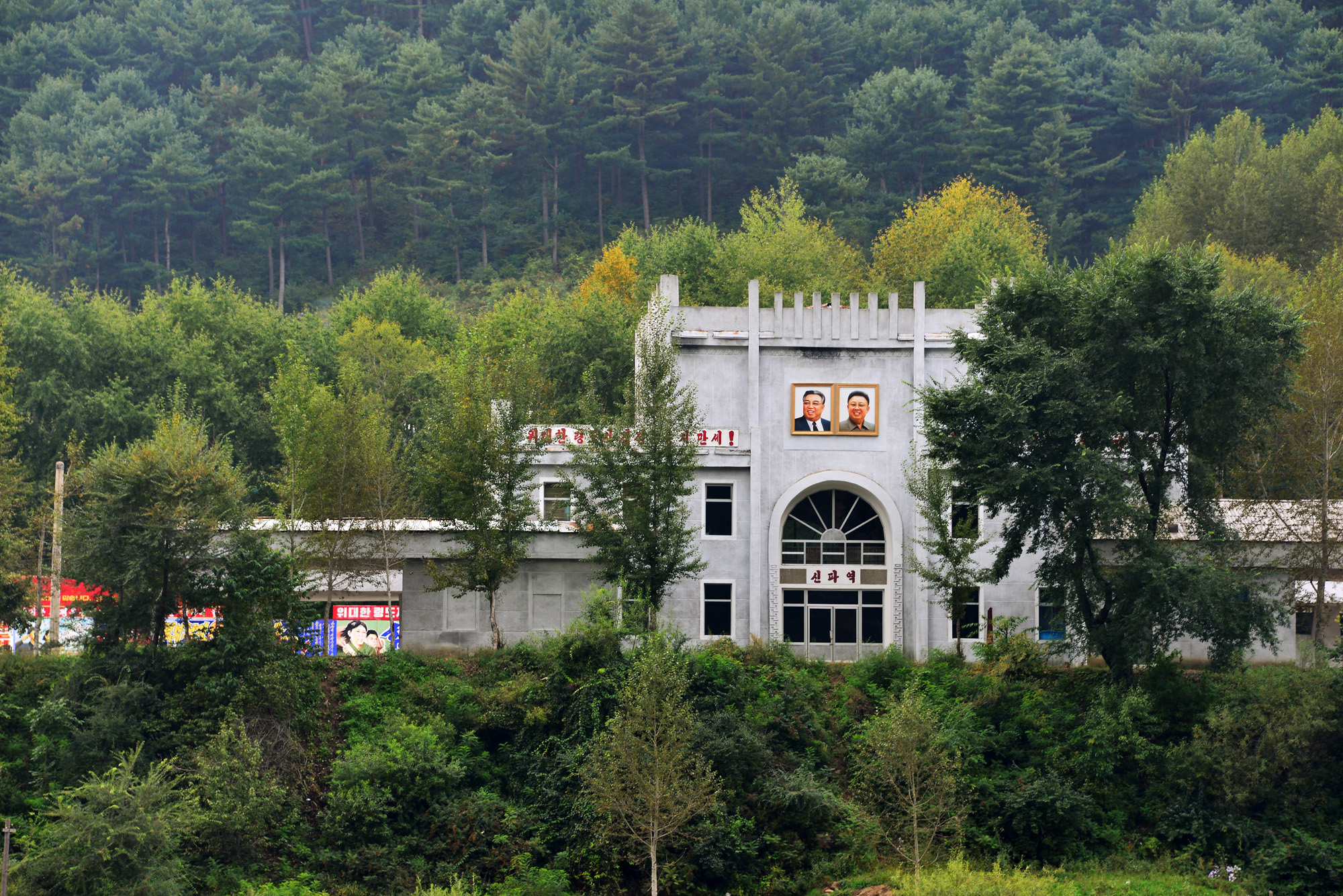
- Sinp'a Ch'ŏngnyŏn station

Korean name
- Hangul: 신파청년역
- Hanja: 新坡青年驛
- Revised Romanization: Sinpa Cheongnyon-nyeok
- McCune–Reischauer: Sinp'a Ch'ŏngnyŏn-nyŏk

General information
- Location: Kimjŏngsuk-ŭp, Kimjŏngsuk-kun, Ryanggang Province; North Korea
- Coordinates: 41.4189°N 127.7615°E
- Owner: Korean State Railway
- Line: Pukpu Line

History
- Opened: 27 November 1987
- Former names: Sinp'a (신파, 新坡)

Services
Preceding station	Korean State Railway	Following station
Kangha towards Manp'o Ch'ŏngnyŏn	Pukbunaeryuk Line	Mint'ang towards Hyesan Ch'ŏngnyŏn
Location

Sinp'a Ch'ŏngnyŏn station is a railway station in Kimjŏngsuk-ŭp, Kimjŏngsuk-kun, Ryanggang Province, North Korea, on the Pukpu Line of the Korean State Railway.

== History ==
The station, originally called Sinp'a station, was opened on 27 November 1987 by the Korean State Railway, along with the rest of the first eastern section of the Pukpu Line between Huju and Hyesan. When the town (and county) of Sinp'a was renamed Kimjŏngsuk, the station itself was not renamed. It received its current name around 2013.
