= Ryanggang Sinsang station =

Railway station in North Korea

Ryanggang Sinsang 량강신상

Korean name
- Hangul: 량강신상역
- Hanja: 両江新上驛
- Revised Romanization: Ryanggang Sinsang-yeok
- McCune–Reischauer: Ryanggang Sinsang-yŏk

General information
- Location: Sinsang-ri, Kimjŏngsuk-kun, Ryanggang Province; North Korea
- Coordinates: 41.4090°N 127.8338°E
- Owner: Korean State Railway
- Line: Pukpu Line

History
- Opened: 27 November 1987

Services
| Preceding station | Korean State Railway | Following station |
|---|---|---|
| Mint'ang towards Manp'o Ch'ŏngnyŏn | Pukbunaeryuk Line | P'ungyang towards Hyesan Ch'ŏngnyŏn |
Location

Ryanggang Sinsang station is a passenger-only railway station in Sinsang-ri, Kimjŏngsuk-kun, Ryanggang Province, North Korea, on the Pukpu Line of the Korean State Railway.

== History ==
The station was opened on 27 November 1987 by the Korean State Railway, along with the rest of the first eastern section of the Pukpu Line between Huju and Hyesan.
