= Pungyang station =

Railway station in North Korea

P'ungyang 풍양

Korean name
- Hangul: 풍양역
- Hanja: 豊陽驛
- Revised Romanization: Pungyang-yeok
- McCune–Reischauer: P'ungyang-yŏk

General information
- Location: P'ungyang-ri, Kimjŏngsuk-kun, Ryanggang Province; North Korea
- Coordinates: 41.4273°N 127.8822°E
- Owner: Korean State Railway
- Line: Pukpu Line

History
- Opened: 27 November 1987

Services
Preceding station	Korean State Railway	Following station
Ryanggang Sinsang towards Manp'o Ch'ŏngnyŏn	Pukbunaeryuk Line	Sangdae towards Hyesan Ch'ŏngnyŏn
Location

P'ungyang station is a railway station in P'ungyang-ri, Kimjŏngsuk-kun, Ryanggang Province, North Korea, on the Pukpu Line of the Korean State Railway.

== History ==
The station was opened on 27 November 1987 by the Korean State Railway, along with the rest of the first eastern section of the Pukpu Line between Huju and Hyesan.
