= Sangdae station =

Railway station in North Korea

Sangdae 상대
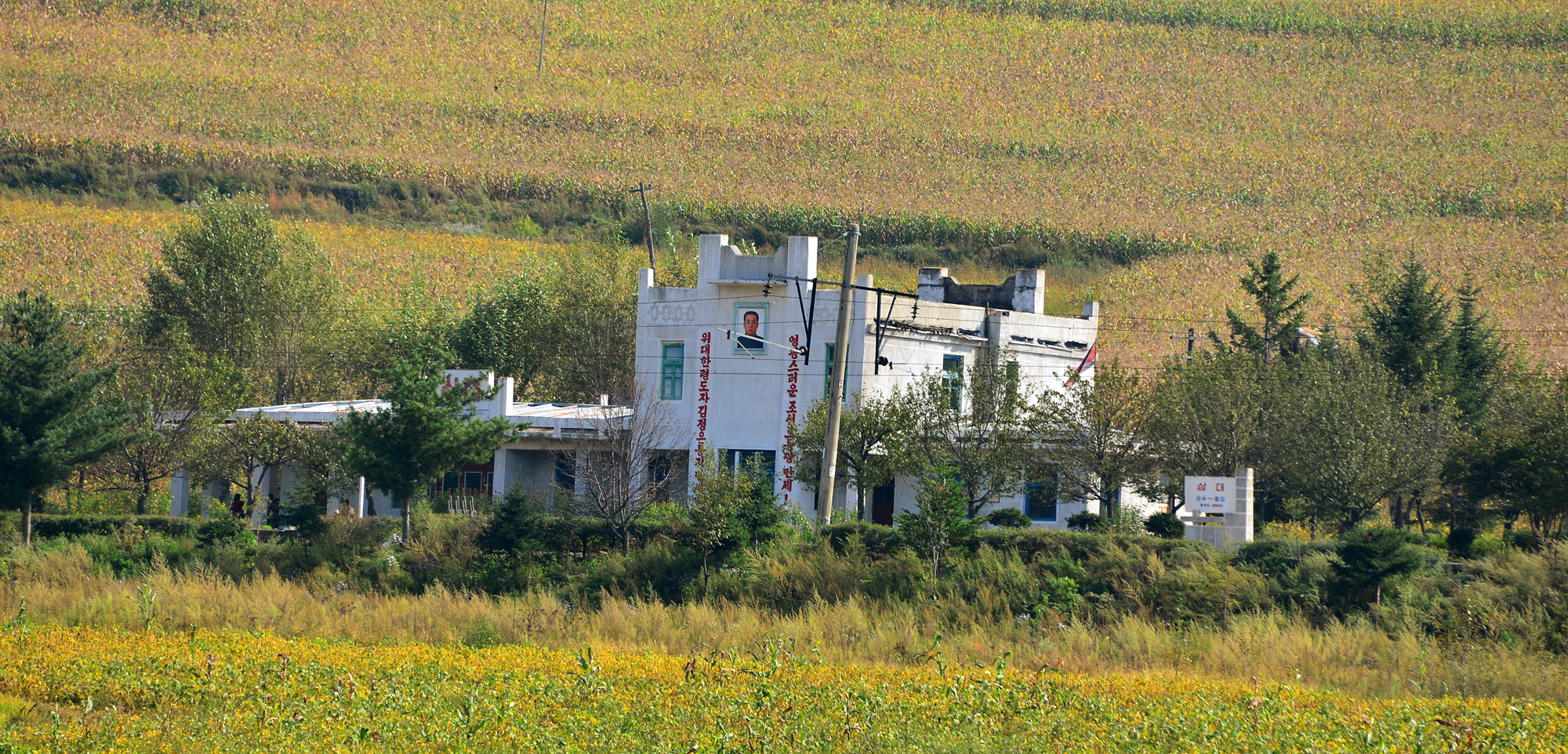
- Sangdae station

Korean name
- Hangul: 상대역
- Hanja: 上台驛
- Revised Romanization: Sangdae-yeok
- McCune–Reischauer: Sangdae-yŏk

General information
- Location: Sangdae-ri, Kimjŏngsuk-kun, Ryanggang Province; North Korea
- Coordinates: 41.4338°N 127.9569°E
- Owner: Korean State Railway
- Line: Pukpu Line

History
- Opened: 27 November 1987

Services
Preceding station	Korean State Railway	Following station
P'ungyang towards Manp'o Ch'ŏngnyŏn	Pukbunaeryuk Line	Insan towards Hyesan Ch'ŏngnyŏn
Location

Sangdae station is a railway station in Sangdae-ri, Kimjŏngsuk-kun, Ryanggang Province, North Korea, on the Pukpu Line of the Korean State Railway.

== History ==
The station was opened on 27 November 1987 by the Korean State Railway, along with the rest of the first eastern section of the Pukpu Line between Huju and Hyesan.
