= Ogubi station =

North Korean railway station

Coordinates: 41.5337°N 127.1553°E

Ogubi 오구비
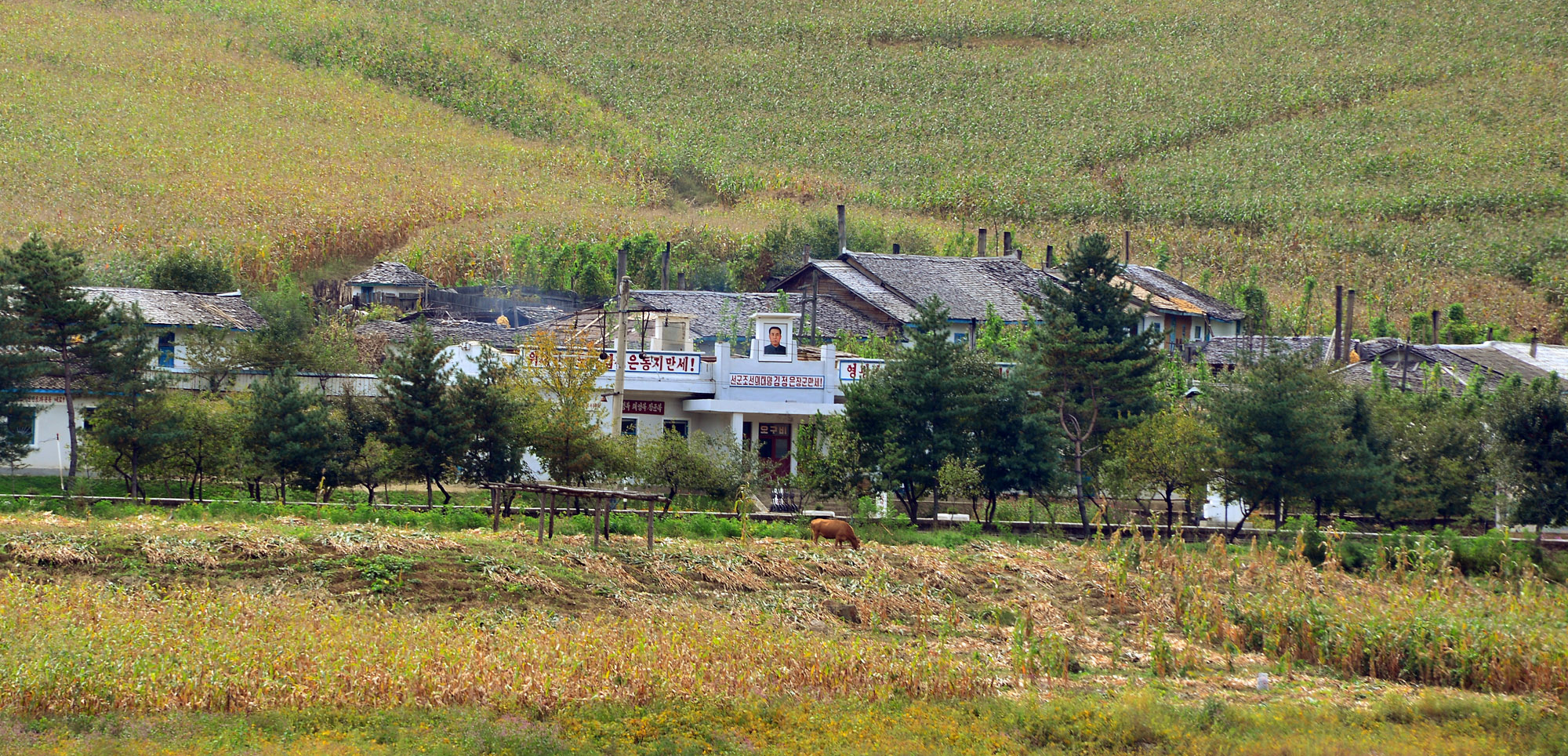
- Ogubi station

Korean name
- Hangul: 오구비역
- Hanja: 五구비驛
- Revised Romanization: Ogubi-yeok
- McCune–Reischauer: Ogubi-yŏk

General information
- Location: Chukjŏl-li, Kimhyŏngjik-kun, Ryanggang Province; North Korea
- Owner: Korean State Railway
- Line: Pukbunaeryuk Line

History
- Opened: 3 August 1988

Services
Preceding station	Korean State Railway	Following station
Rot'an towards Manp'o Ch'ŏngnyŏn	Pukbunaeryuk Line	Tuji towards Hyesan Ch'ŏngnyŏn
Location

Ogubi station is a railway station in Chukjŏl-li, Kimhyŏngjik-kun, Ryanggang Province, North Korea, on the Pukbunaeryuk Line of the Korean State Railway.

== History ==
The station was opened on 3 August 1988 by the Korean State Railway, along with the rest of the second section of the Pukpu Line between Chasŏng and Huju.
