= Mun'ak station =

Railway station in Chagang Province, North Korea

Mun'ak 문악
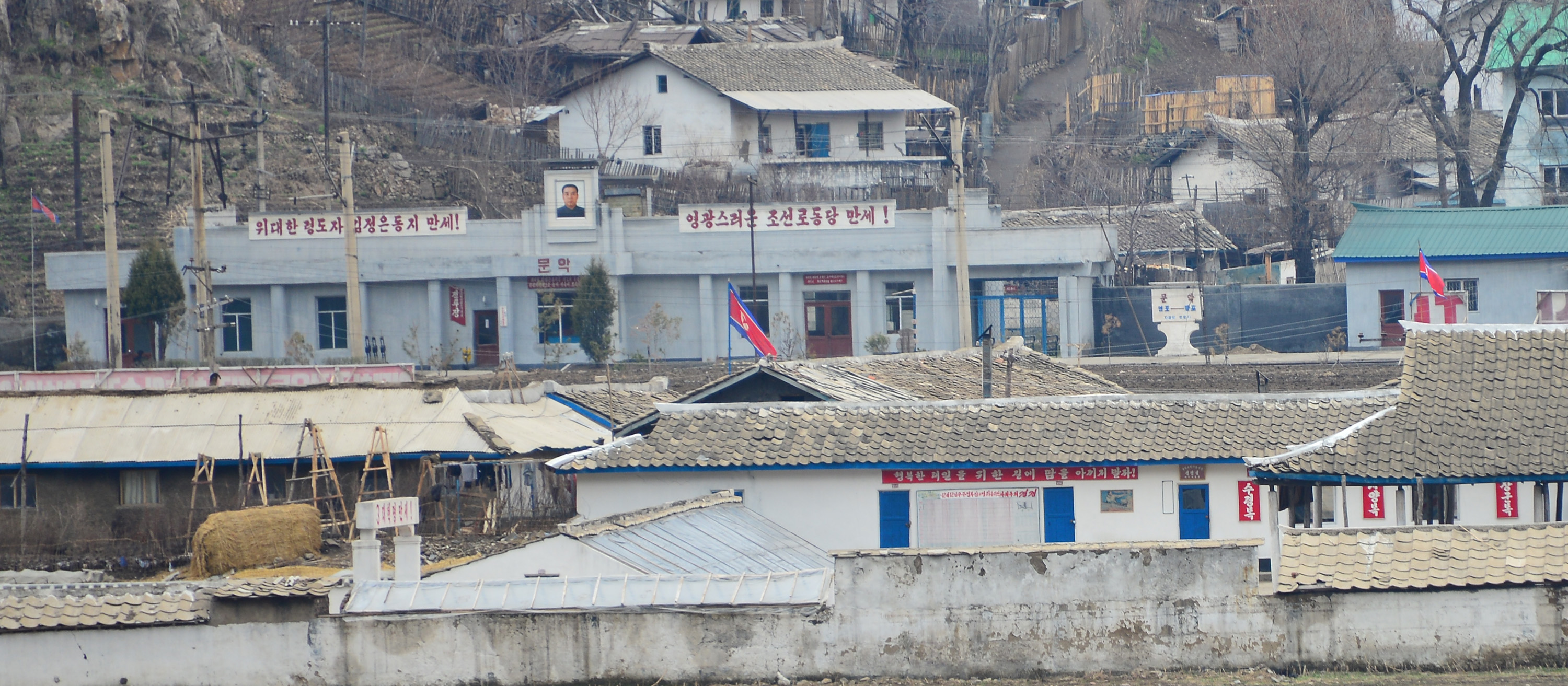
- Mun'ak Station.

Korean name
- Hangul: 문악역
- Hanja: 文岳驛
- Revised Romanization: Munak-yeok
- McCune–Reischauer: Munak-yŏk

General information
- Location: Mun'ak-tong, Manp'o-si, Chagang Province; North Korea
- Coordinates: 41.2114°N 126.3150°E
- Owner: Korean State Railway
- Line: Pukbunaeryuk Line

History
- Opened: 1959

Services
Preceding station	Korean State Railway	Following station
Ch'agap'yŏng towards Manp'o Ch'ŏngnyŏn	Pukbunaeryuk Line	Yonpo towards Hyesan Ch'ŏngnyŏn
Terminus	An'gol Line	An'gol Terminus
Location

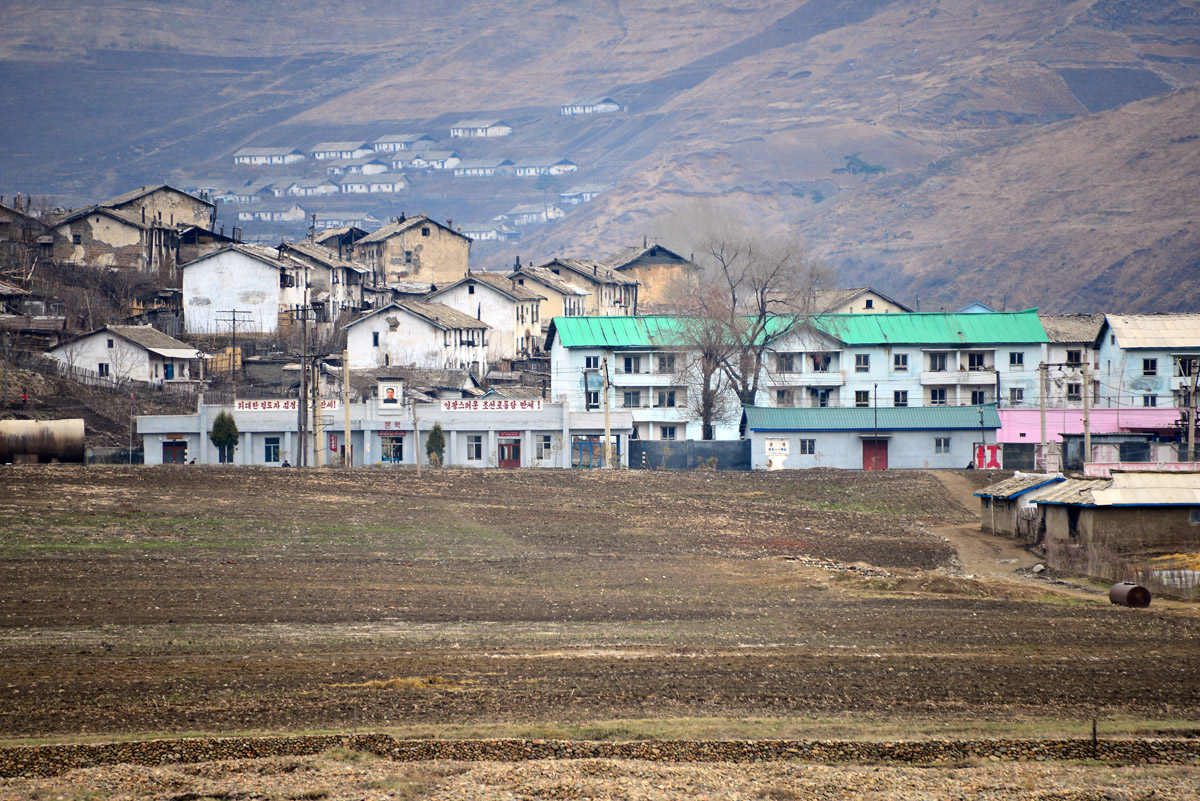
General view of the station area.

Mun'ak station is a railway station in Mun'ak-tong, Manp'o municipal city, Chagang Province, North Korea, on the Pukbunaeryuk Line of the Korean State Railway; it is also the starting point of the An'gol Line.

== History ==
The station was opened in 1959 by the Korean State Railway, along with the rest of the original Unbong Line from Hyesan to Manp'o; much of this line was absorbed into the Pukpu Line in 1988.
