= Kangha station =

Railway station in North Korea

Kangha 강하
- Kangha station

Korean name
- Hangul: 강하역
- Hanja: 江下驛
- Revised Romanization: Gangha-yeok
- McCune–Reischauer: Kangha-yŏk

General information
- Location: Kangha-ri, Kimjŏngsuk-kun, Ryanggang Province; North Korea
- Coordinates: 41.4153°N 127.6770°E
- Owner: Korean State Railway
- Line: Pukpu Line

History
- Opened: 27 November 1987

Services
Preceding station	Korean State Railway	Following station
Songjŏn towards Manp'o Ch'ŏngnyŏn	Pukbunaeryuk Line	Sinp'a Ch'ŏngnyŏn towards Hyesan Ch'ŏngnyŏn
Location

Kangha station is a railway station in Kangha-ri, Kimjŏngsuk-kun, Ryanggang Province, North Korea, on the Pukpu Line of the Korean State Railway.

== History ==
The station was opened on 27 November 1987 by the Korean State Railway, along with the rest of the first eastern section of the Pukpu Line between Huju and Hyesan.
