= Taeung station =

Railway station in North Korea

Taeŭng 대응

Korean name
- Hangul: 대응역
- Hanja: 大鷹驛
- Revised Romanization: Daeeung-yeok
- McCune–Reischauer: Taeŭng-yŏk

General information
- Location: Taeŭng-ri, Kimhyŏngjik-kun, Ryanggang Province; North Korea
- Owner: Korean State Railway
- Line: Pukpu Line

History
- Opened: 3 August 1988

Services
Preceding station	Korean State Railway	Following station
Rajuk towards Manp'o Ch'ŏngnyŏn	Pukbunaeryuk Line	Huju Ch'ŏngnyŏn towards Hyesan Ch'ŏngnyŏn
Location

Taeŭng station is a railway station in Taeŭng-ri, Kimhyŏngjik-kun, Ryanggang Province, North Korea, on the Pukpu Line of the Korean State Railway.

== History ==
The station was opened on 3 August 1988 by the Korean State Railway, along with the rest of the second section of the Pukpu Line between Chasŏng and Huju.
