= Songjon station =

Railway station in North Korea

Songjŏn 송전
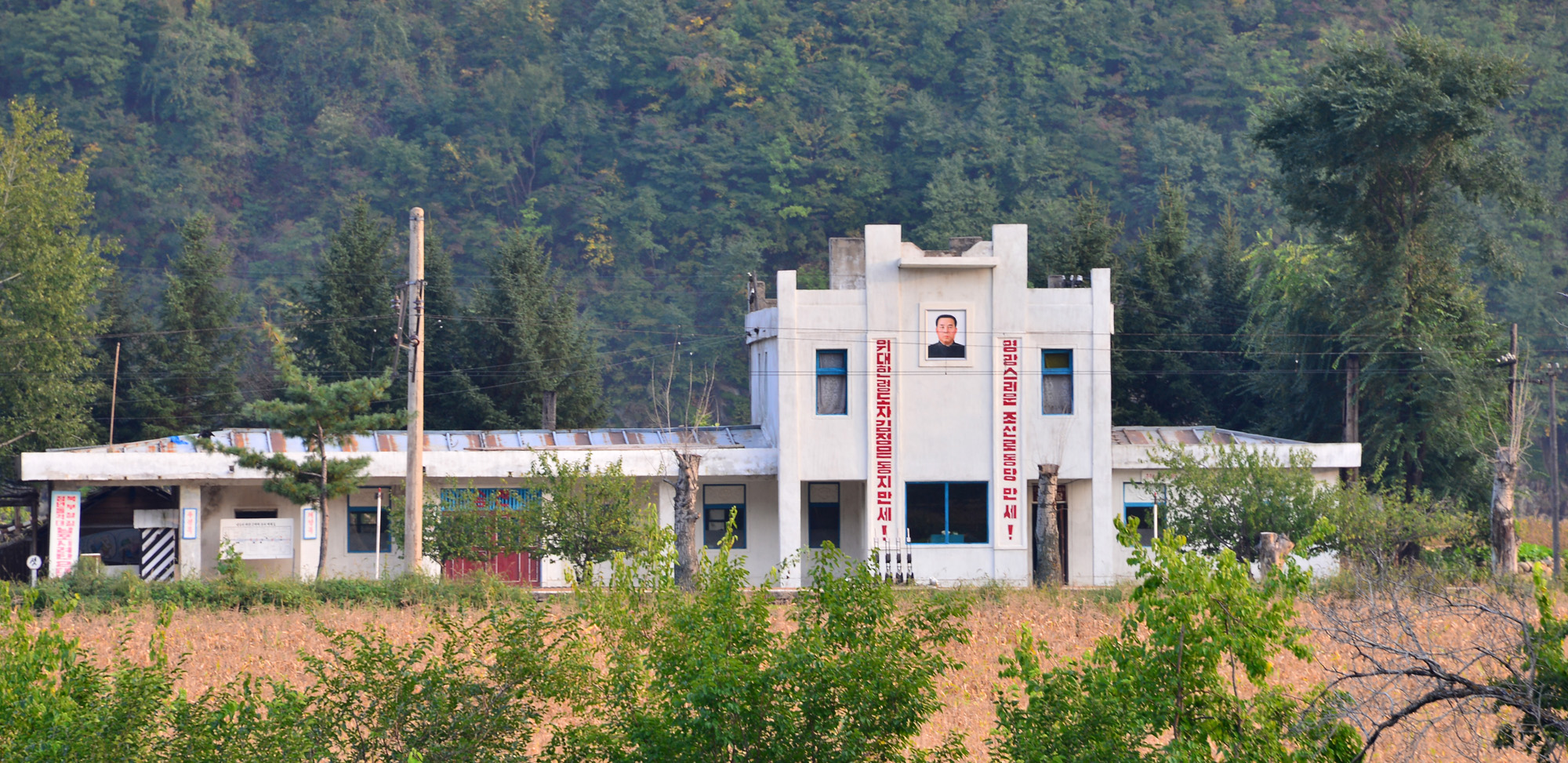
- Songjŏn station

Korean name
- Hangul: 송전역
- Hanja: 松田驛
- Revised Romanization: Songjeon-nyeok
- McCune–Reischauer: Songjŏn-nyŏk

General information
- Location: Songjŏl-li, Kimjŏngsuk-kun, Ryanggang Province; North Korea
- Coordinates: 41.425°N 127.599°E
- Owner: Korean State Railway
- Line: Pukpu Line

History
- Opened: 27 November 1987

Services
Preceding station	Korean State Railway	Following station
Huju Ch'ŏngnyŏn towards Manp'o Ch'ŏngnyŏn	Pukbunaeryuk Line	Kangha towards Hyesan Ch'ŏngnyŏn
Location

A view of the station platform

Songjŏn station is a railway station in Songjŏl-li, Kimjŏngsuk-kun, Ryanggang Province, North Korea, on the Pukpu Line of the Korean State Railway.

== History ==
The station was opened on 27 November 1987 by the Korean State Railway, along with the rest of the first eastern section of the Pukpu Line between Huju and Hyesan.
