= Rajuk station =

Railway station in North Korea

Rajuk 라죽
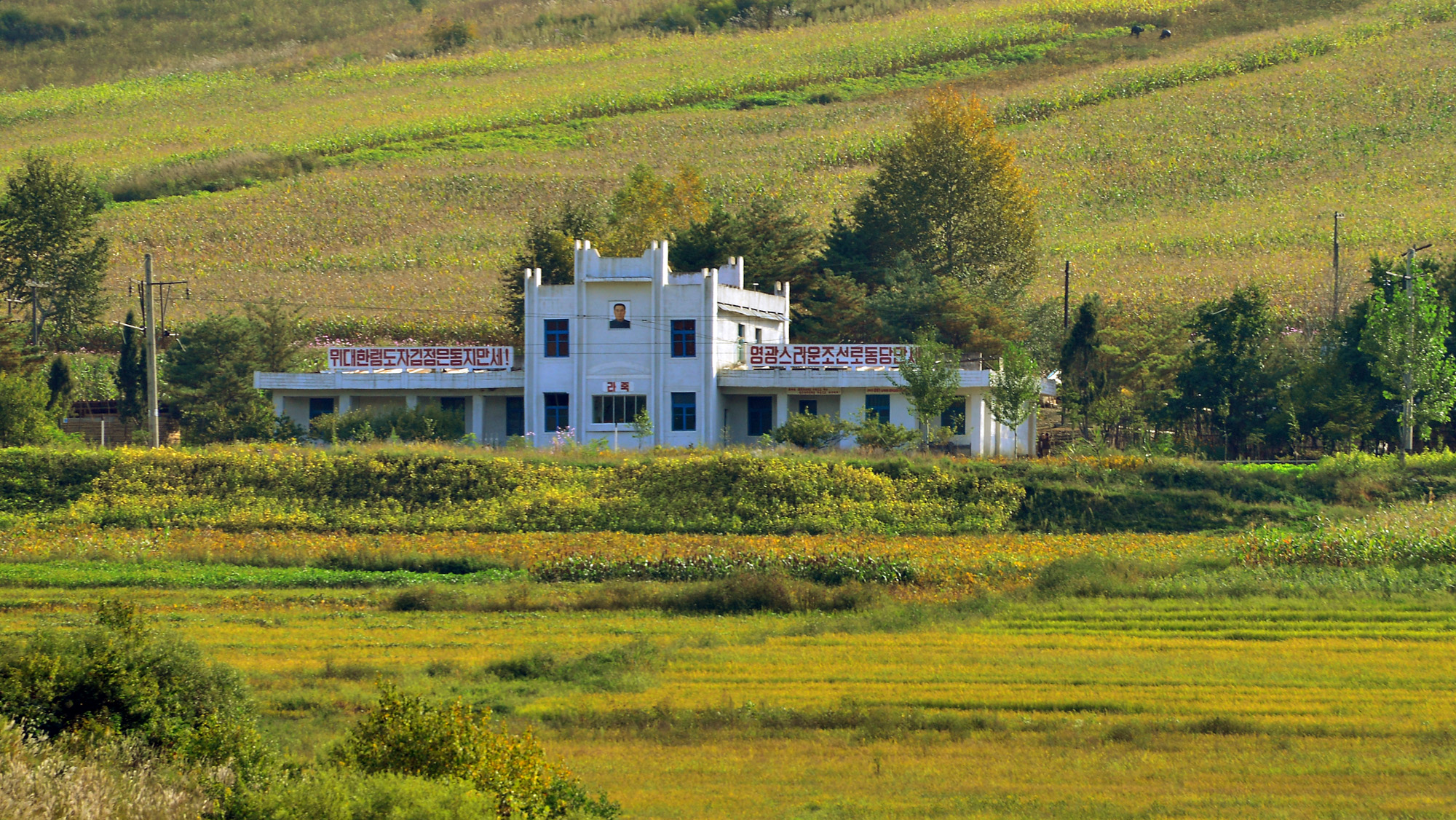
- Rajuk station

Korean name
- Hangul: 라죽역
- Hanja: 羅竹驛
- Revised Romanization: Rajung-yeok
- McCune–Reischauer: Rajung-yŏk

General information
- Location: Rajung-ri, Kimhyŏngjik-kun, Ryanggang Province; North Korea
- Coordinates: 41.4623°N 127.3611°E
- Owner: Korean State Railway
- Line: Pukpu Line

History
- Opened: 3 August 1988

Services
Preceding station	Korean State Railway	Following station
Much'ang towards Manp'o Ch'ŏngnyŏn	Pukbunaeryuk Line	Taeŭng towards Hyesan Ch'ŏngnyŏn
Location

Rajuk station is a railway station in Rajung-ri, Kimhyŏngjik-kun, Ryanggang Province, North Korea, on the Pukpu Line of the Korean State Railway.

== History ==
The station was opened on 3 August 1988 by the Korean State Railway, along with the rest of the second section of the Pukpu Line between Chasŏng and Huju.
