= Insan station =

Railway station in North Korea

Insan 인산

Korean name
- Hangul: 인산역
- Hanja: 仁山驛
- Revised Romanization: Insan-nyeok
- McCune–Reischauer: Insan-nyŏk

General information
- Location: Sangdae-ri, Kimjŏngsuk-kun, Ryanggang Province; North Korea
- Coordinates: 41.4152°N 127.9833°E
- Owner: Korean State Railway
- Line: Pukbunaeryuk Line

History
- Opened: 27 November 1987

Services
| Preceding station | Korean State Railway | Following station |
|---|---|---|
| Sangdae towards Manp'o Ch'ŏngnyŏn | Pukbunaeryuk Line | Samsu Ch'ŏngnyŏn towards Hyesan Ch'ŏngnyŏn |
Location

Insan station is a passenger-only railway station in Sangdae-ri, Kimjŏngsuk-kun, Ryanggang Province, North Korea, on the Pukbunaeryuk Line of the Korean State Railway.

== History ==
The station was opened on 27 November 1987 by the Korean State Railway, along with the rest of the first eastern section of the Pukpu Line between Huju and Hyesan.
