= Mintang station =

Railway station in Ryanggangdo, North Korea

Min'tang 민탕
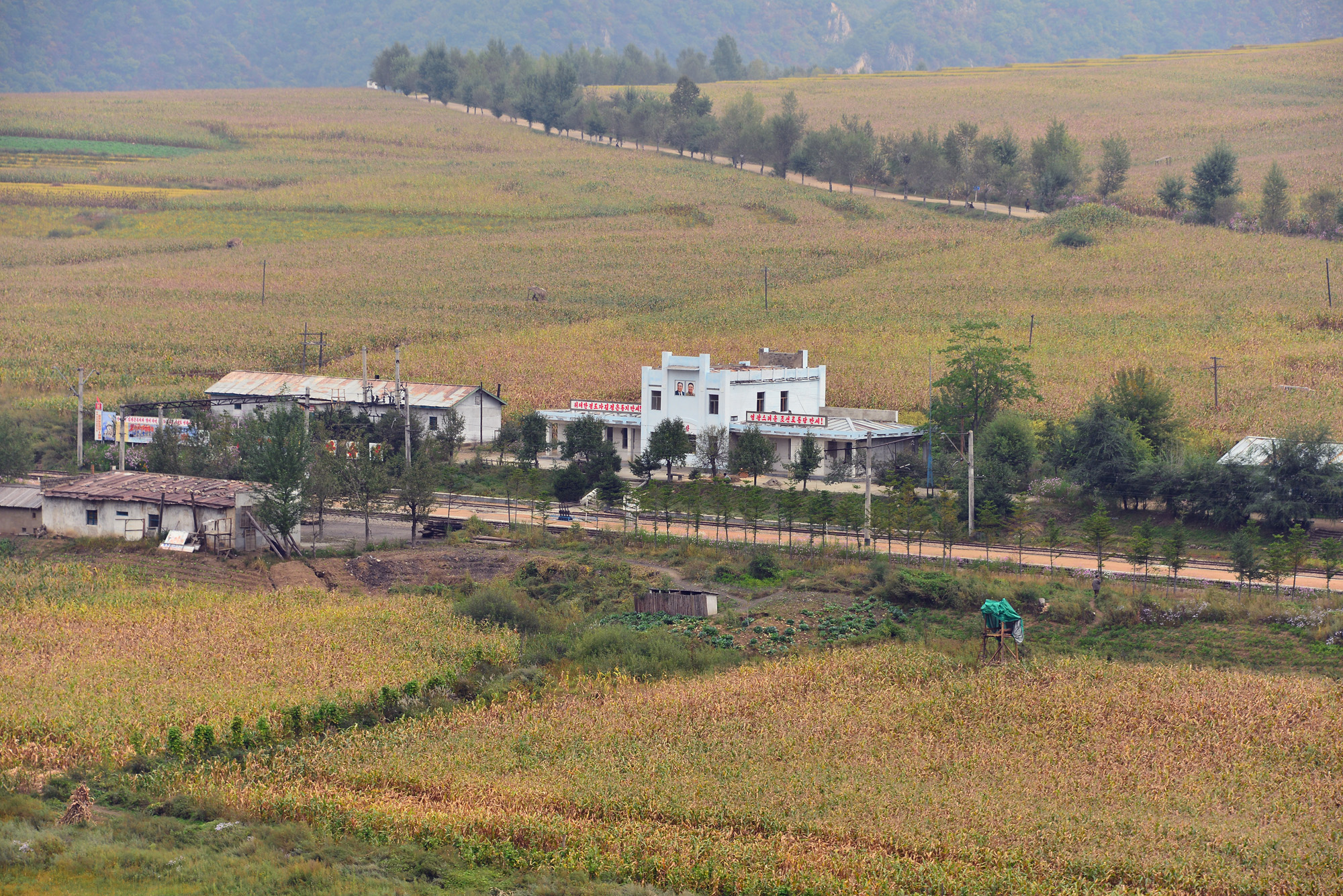
- General view of Mint'ang station

Korean name
- Hangul: 민탕역
- Hanja: 珉湯驛
- Revised Romanization: Mintang-yeok
- McCune–Reischauer: Mint'ang-yŏk

General information
- Location: Sinsang-ri, Kimjŏngsuk-kun, Ryanggang Province; North Korea
- Coordinates: 41.4114°N 127.7929°E
- Owner: Korean State Railway
- Line: Pukbunaeryuk Line

History
- Opened: 27 November 1987

Services
Preceding station	Korean State Railway	Following station
Sinp'a Ch'ŏngnyŏn towards Manp'o Ch'ŏngnyŏn	Pukbunaeryuk Line	Ryanggang Sinsang towards Hyesan Ch'ŏngnyŏn
Location

Mint'ang station is a railway station in Sinsang-ri, Kimjŏngsuk-kun, Ryanggang Province, North Korea, on the Pukbunaeryuk Line of the Korean State Railway.

== History ==
The station was opened on 27 November 1987 by the Korean State Railway, along with the rest of the first eastern section of the Pukbunaeryuk Line between Huju and Hyesan. The station name comes from the name of a village, Mintang-ri, which existed from the Chosŏn Dynasty period until 1952, when it was merged into Sinsang-ri.

== Gallery ==
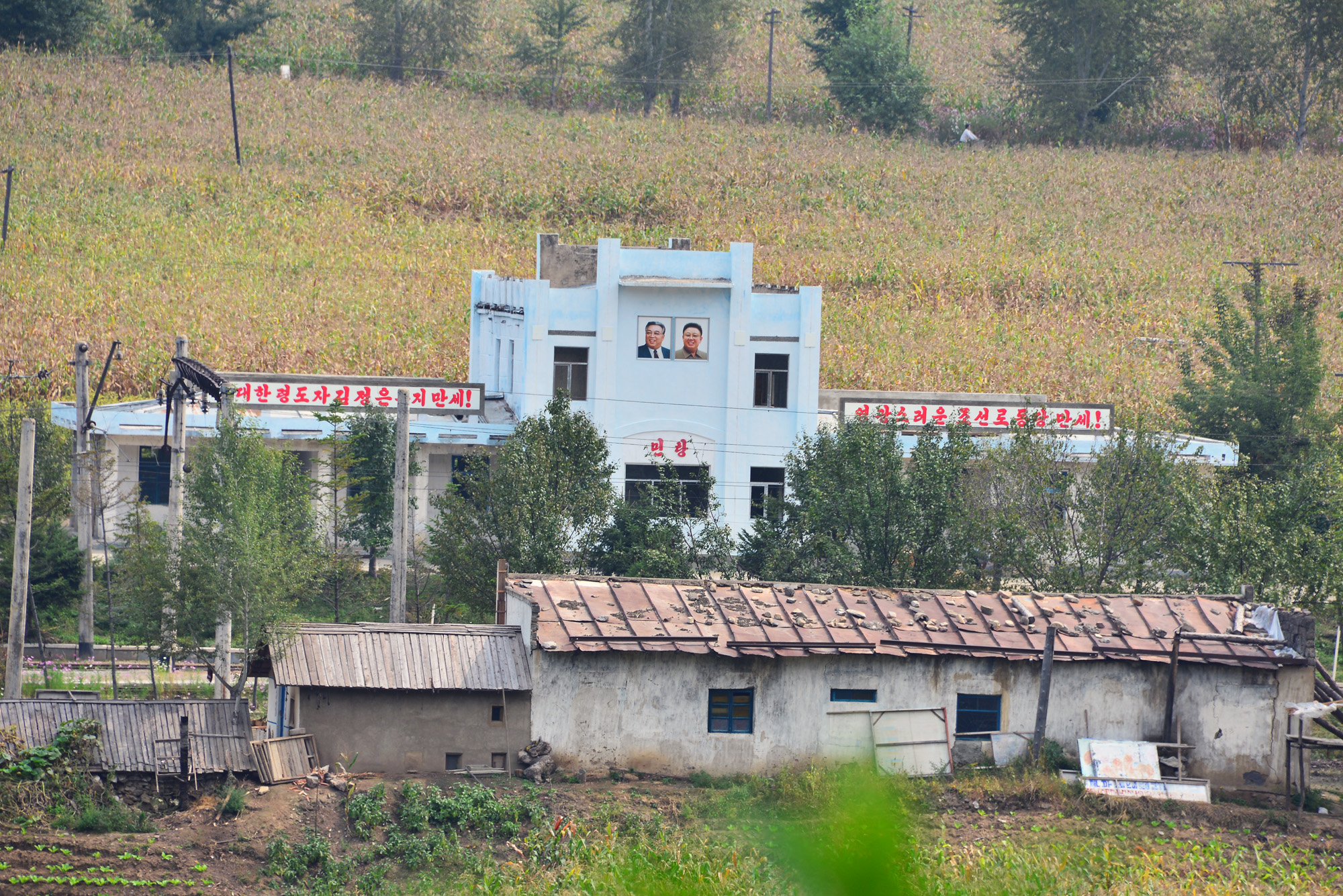
The main station building

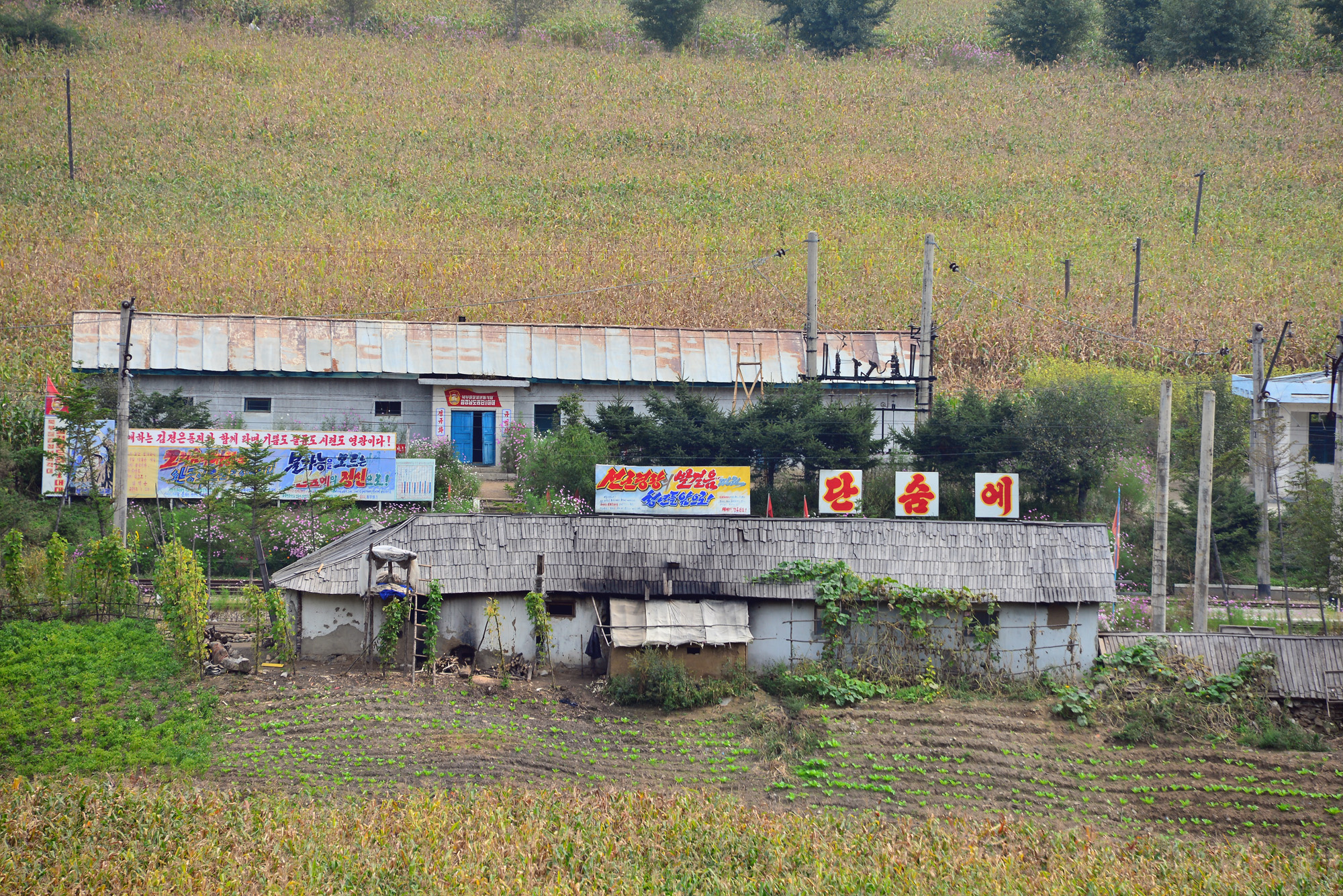
The freight house at Mint'ang Station.
