= Samsu Chongnyon station =

Railway station in North Korea

Samsu Ch'ŏngnyŏn 삼수청년
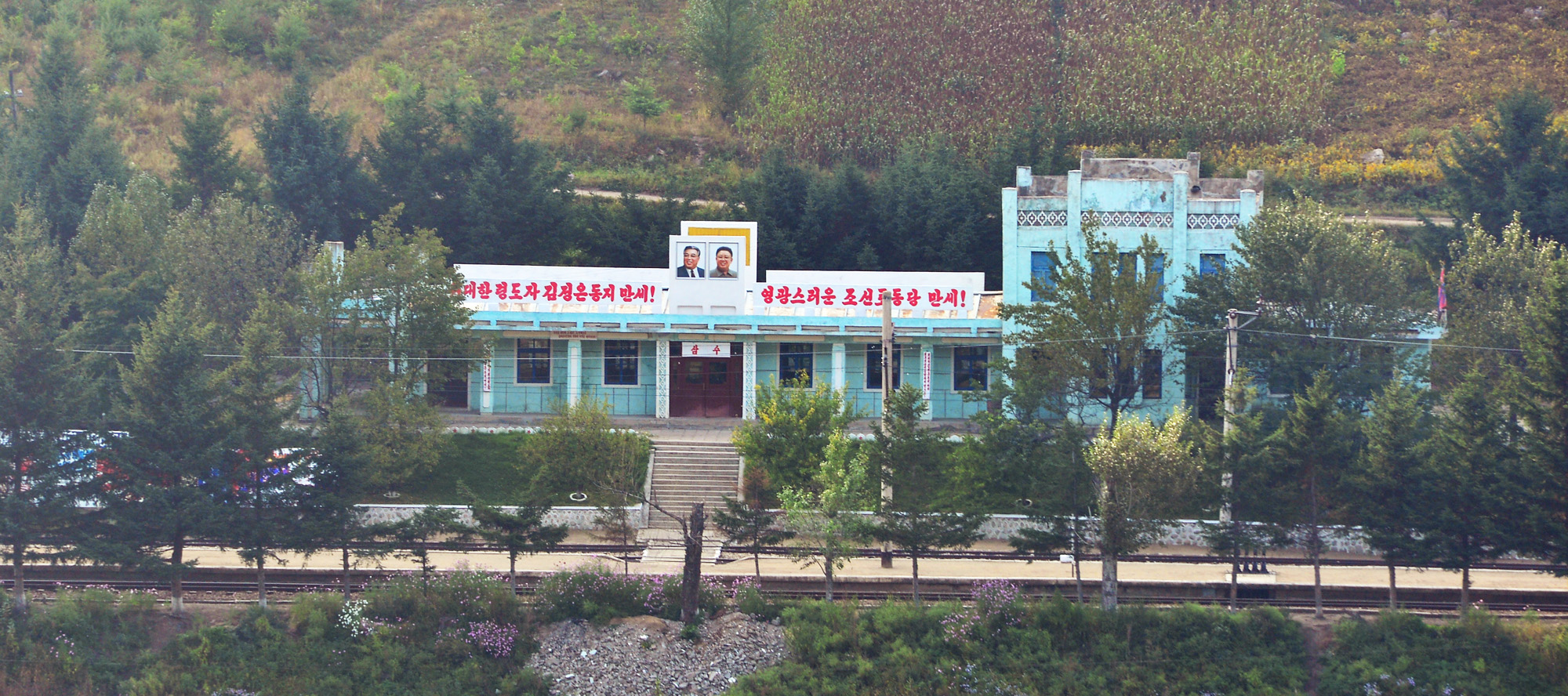
- Samsu Ch'ŏngnyŏn station

Korean name
- Hangul: 삼수청년역
- Hanja: 三水青年驛
- Revised Romanization: Samsu Cheongnyeon-nyeok
- McCune–Reischauer: Samsu Ch'ŏngnyŏn-nyŏk

General information
- Location: P'osŏng-rodongjagu, Samsu-gun, Ryanggang Province; North Korea
- Coordinates: 41.3988°N 128.0311°E
- Owner: Korean State Railway
- Line: Pukbunaeryuk Line

History
- Opened: 27 November 1987
- Former names: Samsu (삼수, 三水)

Services
Preceding station	Korean State Railway	Following station
Insan towards Manp'o Ch'ŏngnyŏn	Pukbunaeryuk Line	Nŭpp'yŏng towards Hyesan Ch'ŏngnyŏn
Location

Samsu Ch'ŏngnyŏn station is a railway station in P'osŏng-rodongjagu, Samsu County, Ryanggang Province, North Korea, on the Pukbunaeryuk Line of the Korean State Railway.

== History ==
The station, originally called Samsu station, was opened on 27 November 1987 by the Korean State Railway, along with the rest of the first eastern section of the Pukbunaeryuk Line between Huju and Hyesan. It received its current name around 2013.
