= Nuppyong station =

Railway station in North Korea

Nŭpp'yŏng 늪평

Korean name
- Hangul: 늪평역
- Hanja: 늪坪驛
- Revised Romanization: Neuppyeong-yeok
- McCune–Reischauer: Nŭpp'yŏng-yŏk

General information
- Location: Kanggu-dong, Hyesan-si, Ryanggang Province; North Korea
- Coordinates: 41.3677°N 128.0922°E
- Owner: Korean State Railway
- Line: Pukbunaeryuk Line

History
- Opened: 27 November 1987

Services
| Preceding station | Korean State Railway | Following station |
|---|---|---|
| Samsu Ch'ŏngnyŏn towards Manp'o Ch'ŏngnyŏn | Pukbunaeryuk Line | Kanggu towards Hyesan Ch'ŏngnyŏn |
Location

Nŭpp'yŏng station is a railway station in Kanggu-dong, Hyesan city, Ryanggang Province, North Korea, on the Pukbunaeryuk Line of the Korean State Railway.

== History ==
The station was opened on 27 November 1987 by the Korean State Railway, along with the rest of the first eastern section of the Pukpu Line between Huju and Hyesan.
