= Tuji station =

Railway station in North Korea

Tuji 두지
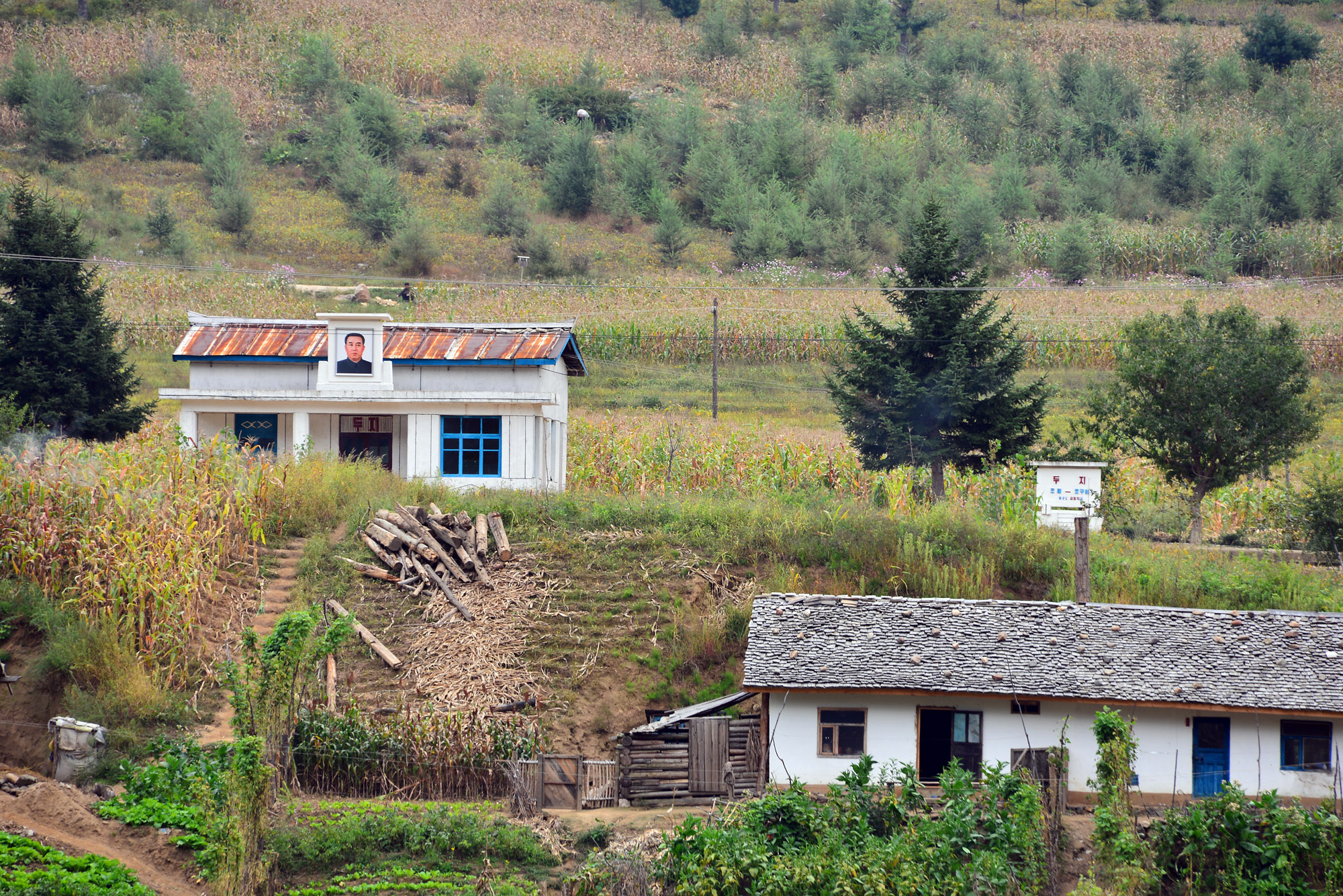
- Tuji station

Korean name
- Hangul: 두지역
- Hanja: 杜芝驛
- Revised Romanization: Duji-yeok
- McCune–Reischauer: Tuji-yŏk

General information
- Location: Tuji-ri, Kimhyŏngjik-kun, Ryanggang Province; North Korea
- Coordinates: 41.5180°N 127.2205°E
- Owner: Korean State Railway
- Line: Pukpu Line

History
- Opened: 3 August 1988

Services
Preceding station	Korean State Railway	Following station
Ogubi towards Manp'o Ch'ŏngnyŏn	Pukbunaeryuk Line	P'op'yŏng Ch'ŏngnyŏn towards Hyesan Ch'ŏngnyŏn
Location

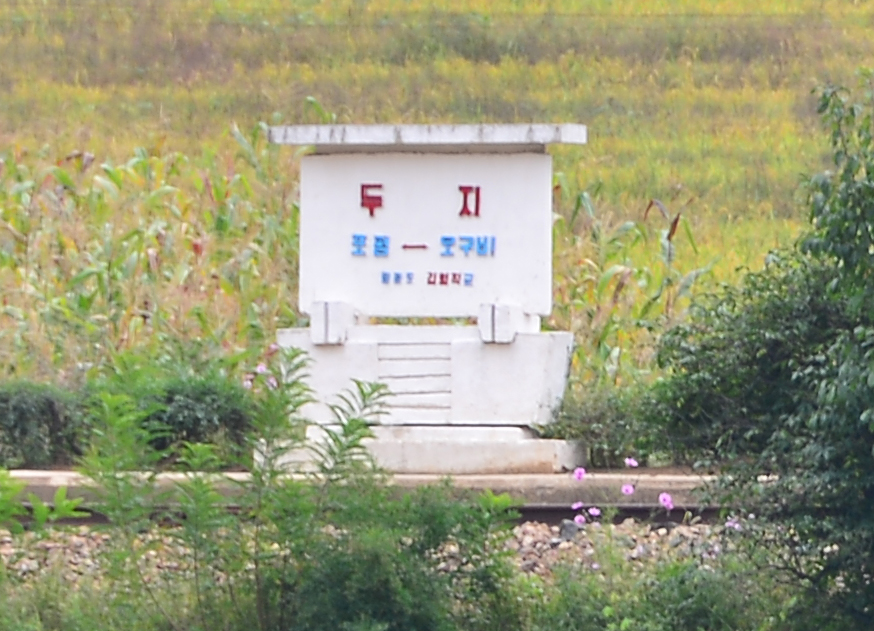
The platform sign at Tuji station

Tuji station is a passenger-only railway station in Tuji-ri, Kimhyŏngjik-kun, Ryanggang Province, North Korea, on the Pukpu Line of the Korean State Railway.

== History ==
The station was opened on 3 August 1988 by the Korean State Railway, along with the rest of the second section of the Pukpu Line between Chasŏng and Huju.
