= Popyong Chongnyon station =

Railway station in North Korea

Pop'yŏng Ch'ŏngnyŏn 포평청년
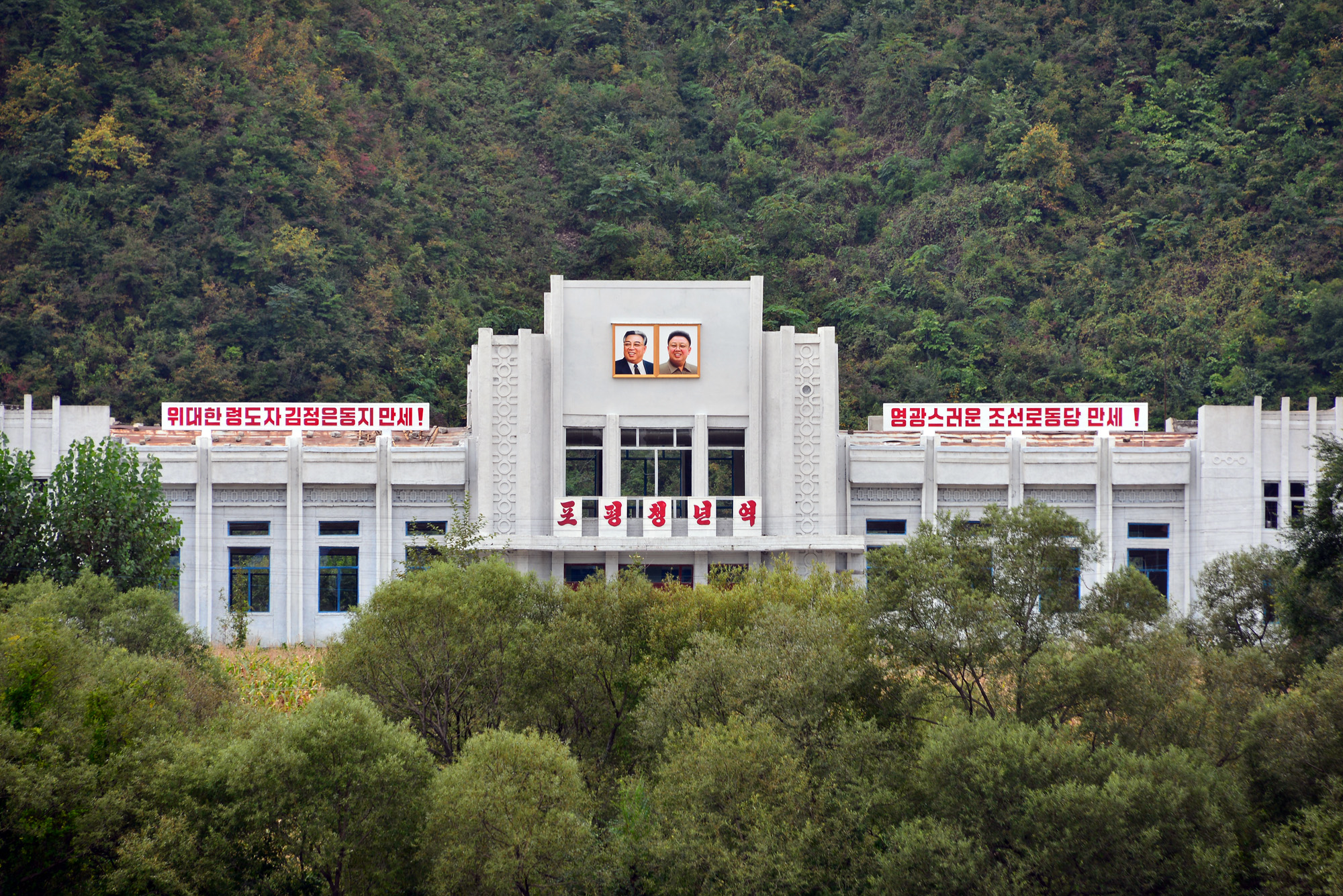
- Pop'yŏng Ch'ŏngnyŏn station

Korean name
- Hangul: 포평청년역
- Hanja: 葡坪青年驛
- Revised Romanization: Popyeong Cheongnyeon-yeok
- McCune–Reischauer: Pop'yŏng Ch'ŏngnyŏn-yŏk

General information
- Location: Kimhyŏngjik-ŭp, Kimhyŏngjik-kun, Ryanggang Province; North Korea
- Coordinates: 41.4992°N 127.2327°E
- Owner: Korean State Railway
- Line: Pukbunaeryuk Line

History
- Opened: 3 August 1988
- Former names: Huch'ang (후창, 厚昌); Pop'yŏng (포평, 葡坪)

Services
Preceding station	Korean State Railway	Following station
Tuji towards Manp'o Ch'ŏngnyŏn	Pukbunaeryuk Line	Much'ang towards Hyesan Ch'ŏngnyŏn
Location

Pop'yŏng Ch'ŏngnyŏn station is a railway station in Kimhyŏngjik-ŭp, Kimhyŏngjik-kun, Ryanggang Province, North Korea, on the Pukbunaeryuk Line of the Korean State Railway.

== History ==
The station, originally called Huch'ang station, was opened on 3 August 1988 by the Korean State Railway, along with the rest of the second section of the Pukpu Line between Chasŏng and Huju. When the town of Huch'ang was renamed Kimhyŏngjik, the station was also renamed, but called Pop'yŏng station instead of "Kimhyŏngjik station". It received its current name around 2012.
