= Rimto station =

Railway station in Manpo, North Korea

Rimt'o 림토
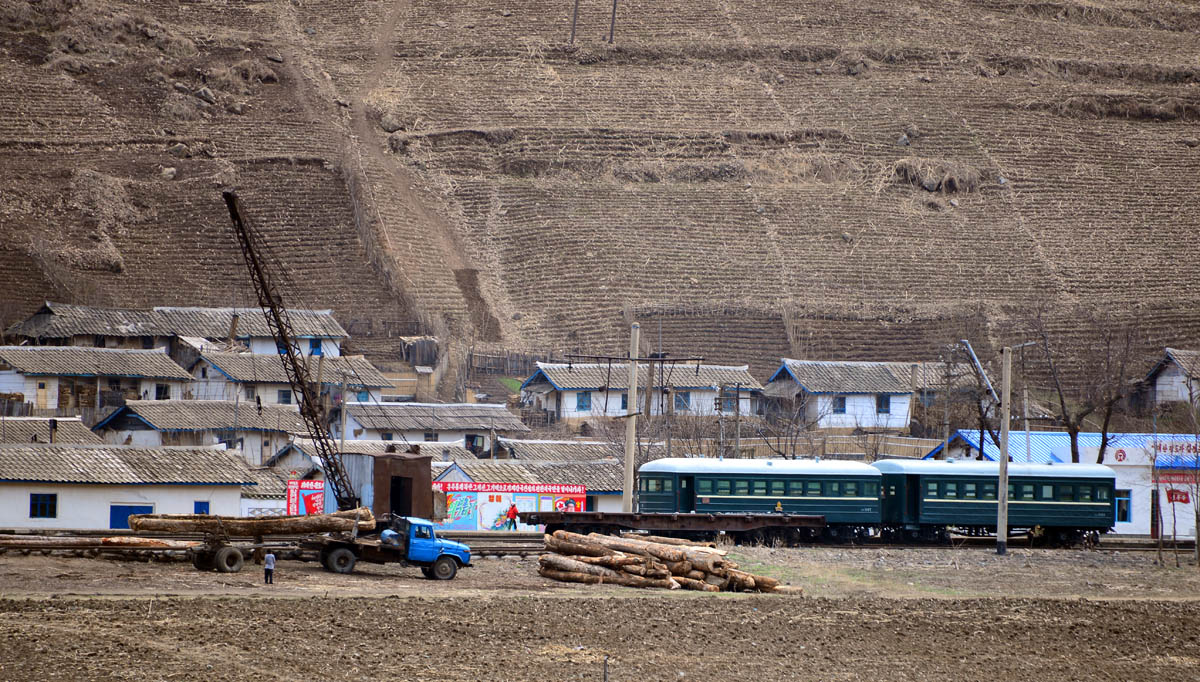
- Rimt'o station

Korean name
- Hangul: 림토역
- Hanja: 林土驛
- Revised Romanization: Rimto-yeok
- McCune–Reischauer: Rimt'o-yŏk

General information
- Location: Manp'o-si, Chagang Province; North Korea
- Coordinates: 41.3185°N 126.4042°E
- Owner: Korean State Railway
- Line: Pukbunaeryuk Line

History
- Opened: 1959

Services
Preceding station	Korean State Railway	Following station
Yonpo towards Manp'o Ch'ŏngnyŏn	Pukbunaeryuk Line	Simridong towards Hyesan Ch'ŏngnyŏn
Location

Rimt'o station is a railway station in Manp'o municipal city, Chagang Province, North Korea, on the Pukbunaeryuk Line of the Korean State Railway.

== History ==
The station was opened in 1959 by the Korean State Railway, along with the rest of the original Unbong Line from Hyesan to Manp'o; much of this line was absorbed into the Pukpu Line in 1988.
