= Chagang Samgang station =

Railway station in North Korea

Chagang Samgang 자강삼강
- Chagang Samgang station

Korean name
- Hangul: 자강삼강역
- Hanja: 慈江三江驛
- Revised Romanization: Jagang Samgang-yeok
- McCune–Reischauer: Chagang Samgang-yŏk

General information
- Location: Samgang-ri, Manp'o-si, Chagang Province; North Korea
- Coordinates: 41.3651°N 126.5001°E
- Owner: Korean State Railway
- Line: Pukbunaeryuk Line

History
- Opened: 1959

Services
Preceding station	Korean State Railway	Following station
Simridong towards Manp'o Ch'ŏngnyŏn	Pukbunaeryuk Line	Songsam towards Hyesan Ch'ŏngnyŏn
Location

Chagang Samgang station is a railway station in Samgang-ri, Manp'o municipal city, Chagang Province, North Korea, on the Pukbunaeryuk Line of the Korean State Railway.

== History ==
The station was opened in 1959 by the Korean State Railway, along with the rest of the original Unbong Line from Hyesan to Manp'o; much of this line was absorbed into the Pukpu Line in 1988.

When the Unbong Line, having been built to assist with the construction of the Unbong Dam on the Yalu River, was built, a branch from Chagang Samgang to the Chinese side of the construction site was built; the branch was subsequently closed, but the bridge across the Yalu is still there, and the right-of-way on the Chinese side is in use as an unpaved trail.
