= Simridong station =

Railway station in North Korea

Simridong 십리동
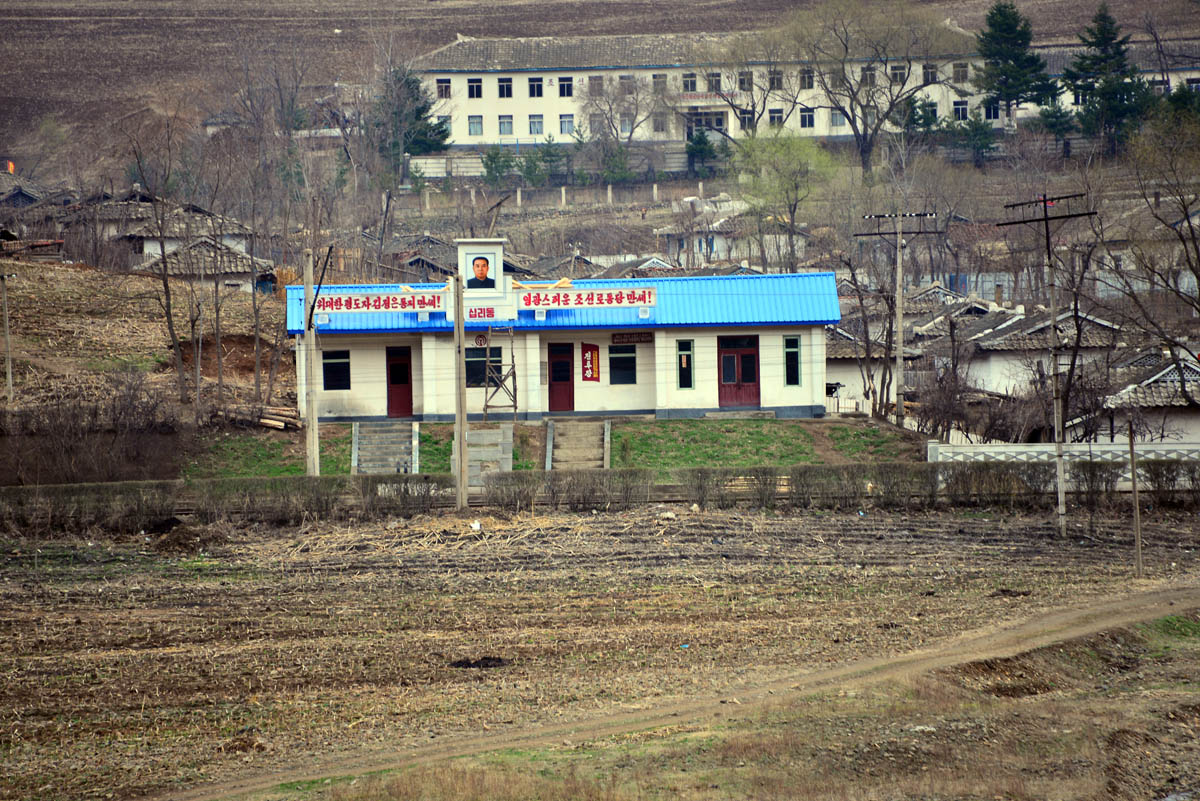
- Simridong station

Korean name
- Hangul: 십리동역
- Hanja: 十里洞驛
- Revised Romanization: Simnidong-yeok
- McCune–Reischauer: Simridong-yŏk

General information
- Location: Simridong-ri, Manp'o-si, Chagang Province; North Korea
- Coordinates: 41.3437°N 126.4318°E
- Owner: Korean State Railway
- Line: Pukbunaeryuk Line

History
- Opened: 1959
- Former names: Oktong (옥동)

Services
Preceding station	Korean State Railway	Following station
Rimt'o towards Manp'o Ch'ŏngnyŏn	Pukbunaeryuk Line	Chagang Samgang towards Hyesan Ch'ŏngnyŏn
Location

Simridong station is a railway station in Simridong-ri, Manp'o municipal city, Chagang Province, North Korea, on the Pukbunaeryuk Line of the Korean State Railway.

== History ==
The station, originally called Oktong station, was opened in 1959 by the Korean State Railway, along with the rest of the original Unbong Line from Hyesan to Manp'o; much of this line was absorbed into the Pukpu Line in 1988.
