= Kanggu station =

Railway station in North Korea

Kanggu 강구

Korean name
- Hangul: 강구역
- Hanja: 江口驛
- Revised Romanization: Ganggu-yeok
- McCune–Reischauer: Kanggu-yŏk

General information
- Location: Kanggu-dong, Hyesan-si, Ryanggang Province; North Korea
- Coordinates: 41.3791°N 128.1303°E
- Owner: Korean State Railway
- Line: Pukbunaeryuk Line

History
- Opened: 27 November 1987

Services
Preceding station	Korean State Railway	Following station
Nŭpp'yŏng towards Manp'o Ch'ŏngnyŏn	Pukbunaeryuk Line	Hyesan Ch'ŏngnyŏn Terminus
Location

Kanggu station is a railway station in Kanggu-dong, Hyesan city, Ryanggang Province, North Korea, on the Pukbunaeryuk Line of the Korean State Railway.

== History ==
The station was opened on 27 November 1987 by the Korean State Railway, along with the rest of the first eastern section of the Pukbunaeryuk Line between Huju and Hyesan.
