= Yonpo station =

Railway station in North Korea

Yŏnp'o 연포
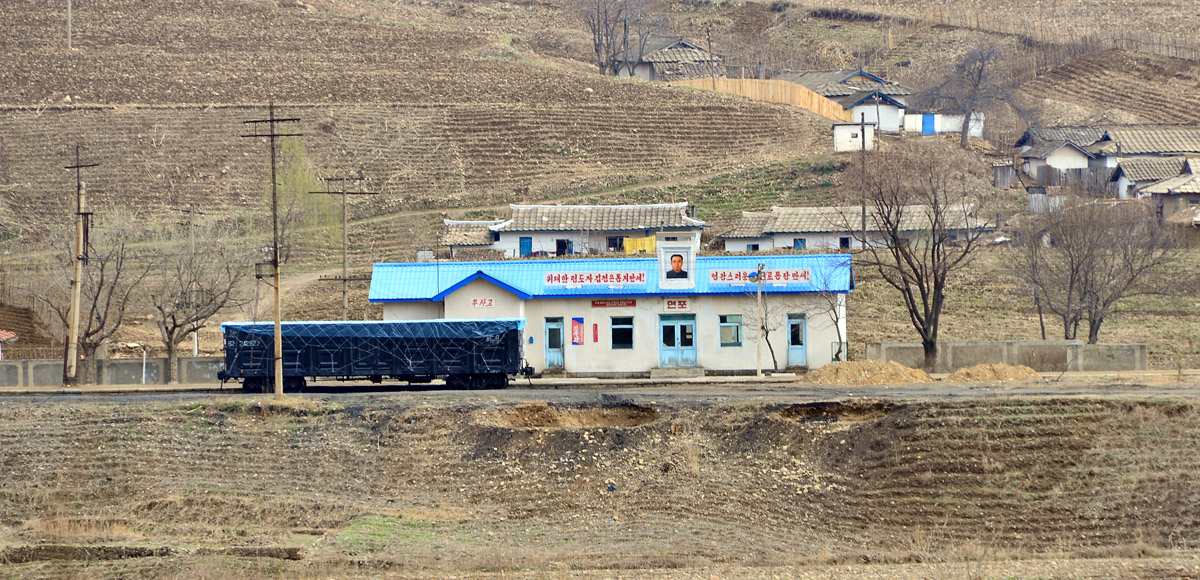
- Yŏnp'o station

Korean name
- Hangul: 연포역
- Hanja: 煙浦驛
- Revised Romanization: Yeonpo-yeok
- McCune–Reischauer: Yŏnp'o-yŏk

General information
- Location: Yŏnp'o-ri, Manp'o-si, Chagang Province; North Korea
- Coordinates: 41.2768°N 126.3674°E
- Owner: Korean State Railway
- Line: Pukbunaeryuk Line

History
- Opened: 1959

Services
Preceding station	Korean State Railway	Following station
Mun'ak towards Manp'o Ch'ŏngnyŏn	Pukbunaeryuk Line	Rimt'o towards Hyesan Ch'ŏngnyŏn
Location

Yŏnp'o station is a railway station in Yŏnp'o-ri, Manp'o municipal city, Chagang Province, North Korea, on the Pukbunaeryuk Line of the Korean State Railway.

== History ==
The station was opened in 1959 by the Korean State Railway, along with the rest of the original Unbong Line from Hyesan to Manp'o; much of this line was absorbed into the Pukpu Line in 1988.
