= Angol Line =

Railway line in North Korea

An'gol Line

Overview
- Native name: 안골선 (안골線)
- Status: Operational
- Owner: Korean State Railway
- Locale: Manp'o-si, Chagang
- Termini: Mun'ak; An'gol
- Stations: 2

Service
- Type: Heavy rail, Regional rail, Freight rail
- Operator: Korean State Railway

Technical
- Line length: 2.9 km (1.8 mi)
- Number of tracks: Single track
- Track gauge: 1,435 mm (4 ft 8 1/2 in) standard gauge

- Angol Line
- Chosŏn'gŭl: 안골선
- Hancha: 안골線
- Revised Romanization: Angolseon
- McCune–Reischauer: An'golsŏn

The An'gol Line is a non-electrified railway line of the Korean State Railway in Manp'o city, Chagang Province, North Korea, running from Mun'ak on the Pukbunaeryuk Line to An'gol.

== Route ==
A yellow background in the "Distance" box indicates that section of the line is not electrified.

| Distance (km) | | Station Name | | Former Name | | |
| Total | S2S | Transcribed | Chosŏn'gŭl (Hanja) | Transcribed | Chosŏn'gŭl (Hanja) | Connections |
|---|---|---|---|---|---|---|
| 0.0 | 0.0 | Mun'ak | 문악 (文岳) | | | Pukbunaeryuk Line |
| 2.9 | 2.9 | An'gol | 안골 (-) | | | |
