= Chagapyong station =

Railway station in Manpo, North Korea

Ch'agap'yŏng 차가평
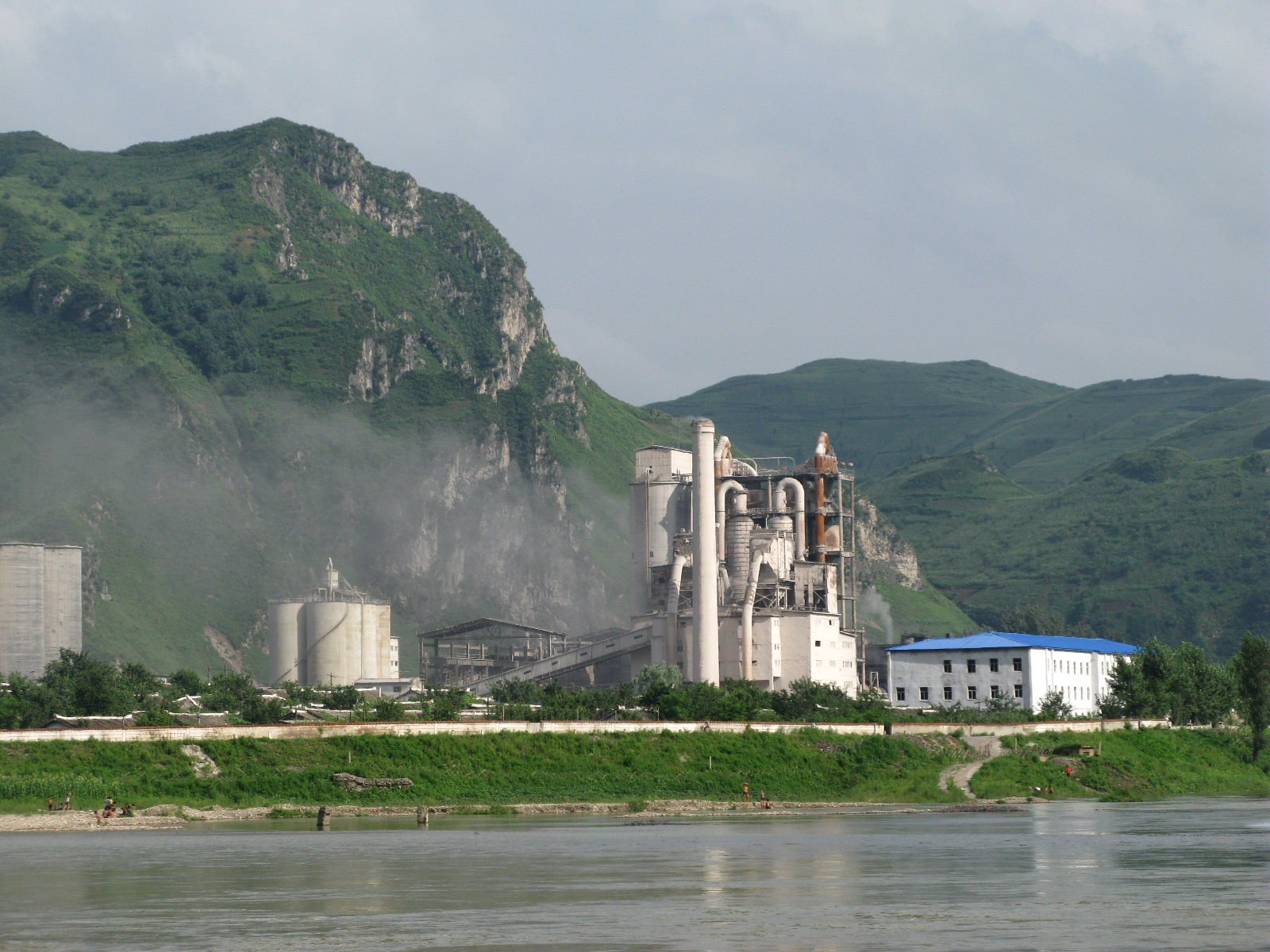
- A view of the Ch'agap'yŏng cement factory at Ch'agap'yŏng station

Korean name
- Hangul: 차가평역
- Hanja: 車家坪驛
- Revised Romanization: Chagapyeong-yeok
- McCune–Reischauer: Ch'agap'yŏng-yŏk

General information
- Location: Manp'o-si, Chagang Province; North Korea
- Coordinates: 41°10′48″N 126°17′33″E
- Owner: Korean State Railway
- Line: Pukbunaeryuk Line

History
- Opened: 1959; 67 years ago

Services
Preceding station	Korean State Railway	Following station
Manp'o Ch'ŏngnyŏn Terminus	Pukbunaeryuk Line	Mun'ak towards Hyesan Ch'ŏngnyŏn
Location

Ch'agap'yŏng station is a railway station in Manp'o municipal city, Chagang Province, North Korea, on the Pukbunaeryuk Line of the Korean State Railway.

== History ==
The station was opened in 1959 by the Korean State Railway, along with the rest of the original Unbong Line from Hyesan to Manp'o; much of this line was absorbed into the Pukpu Line in 1988.
