= 강구 =

강구 may refer to:

- Ganggu-myeon (강구면), myeon in Yeongdeok County, North Gyeongsang Province, South Korea
- Kang Goo (강구), character in the television series Strong Girl Bong-soon
- Kang-goo (강구), character in the television series Brothers in Heaven
- Kanggu-dong (강구동), dong in Hyesan city, Ryanggang Province, North Korea
- Kanggu station, railway station in Kanggu-dong, Hyesan city, Ryanggang Province, North Korea
- Lee Kang-gu (이강구), character in the television series The Story of Kang-goo
