= Unha station =

Railway station in Manpo, North Korea

Unha 운하

Korean name
- Hangul: 운하역
- Hanja: 運河驛
- Revised Romanization: Unha-yeok
- McCune–Reischauer: Unha-yŏk

General information
- Location: Manp'o-si, Chagang Province; North Korea
- Owner: Korean State Railway
- Line: Manp'o Line

History
- Opened: 1 February 1939
- Original company: Chosen Government Railway

Services
Preceding station	Korean State Railway	Following station
Kuo towards Manp'o Ch'ŏngnyŏn	Unha Line	Terminus

Unha station is a railway station in Manp'o municipal city, Chagang province, North Korea. It is the terminus of the Unha Line of the Korean State Railway.

== History ==
The station was opened on 1 February 1939 by the Chosen Government Railway, along with the rest of the last section of the Manp'o Line from Kanggye to Manp'o.
