= Unha Line =

Railway line in North Korea

Overview
- Native name: 운하선 (運河線)
- Status: Operational
- Owner: Chosen Government Railway (1939–1945); Korean State Railway (1945 to date)
- Locale: Manp'o-si, Chagang
- Termini: Manp'o Ch'ŏngnyŏn; Unha
- Stations: 3

Service
- Type: Heavy rail, Regional rail, Freight rail

History
- Opened: 1 February 1939

Technical
- Line length: 6.5 km (4.0 mi)
- Number of tracks: Single track
- Track gauge: 1,435 mm (4 ft 8 1/2 in) standard gauge
- Electrification: 3000 V DC Catenary

- Unha Line
- Hangul: 운하선
- Hanja: 運河線
- RR: Unhaseon
- MR: Unhasŏn

The Unha Line is an electrified railway line of the Korean State Railway in Manp'o city, Chagang Province, North Korea, running from Manp'o on the Manp'o Line to Unha.

== History ==
The Unha Line was opened by the Chosen Government Railway on 1 February 1939, together with the final section of the Manp'o Line running from Kanggye to Manp'o.

== Route ==
A yellow background in the "Distance" box indicates that section of the line is not electrified.

Distance (km)		Station Name		Former Name		
Total	S2S	Transcribed	Chosŏn'gŭl (Hanja)	Transcribed	Chosŏn'gŭl (Hanja)	Connections
0.0	0.0	Manp'o Ch'ŏngnyŏn	만포청년 (滿浦靑年)			Manp'o Line, Pukbunaeryuk Line
3.0	3.0	Kuo	구오 (九五)			
6.5	3.5	Unha	운하 (運河)			
