= Kimhyongjik County =

Coordinates: 41.50706523475901°N 127.26830718492991°E

Kim Hyŏng-jik County 김형직군
- County

Korean transcription(s)
  - Chosŏn'gŭl: 김형직군
  - Hancha: 金亨稷郡
  - McCune-Reischauer: Kimhyŏngjik-kun
  - Revised Romanization: Gimhyeongjik-gun
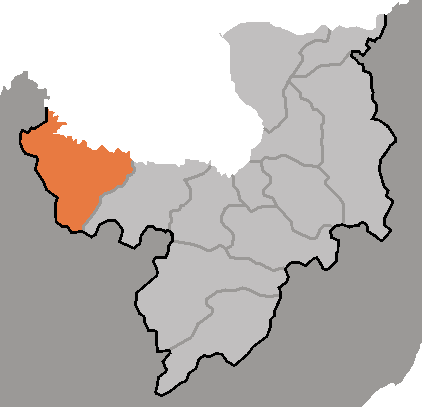
- Map of Ryanggang showing the location of Kimhyongjik
- Country: North Korea
- Province: Ryanggang
- Administrative divisions: 1 ŭp, 6 workers' districts, 9 ri

Area
  - Total: 1,465 km^{2} (566 sq mi)

Population (2008)
  - Total: 57,729
  - Density: 39.41/km^{2} (102.1/sq mi)

Kimhyŏngjik County is a kun of Ryanggang Province, North Korea. Formerly known as Huch'ang County, it was renamed in 1988 in honour of Kim Hyŏng-jik, the leader of the anti-Japanese liberation movement of Korea.

The 2004 Ryanggang explosion occurred at Wŏltal-lodongjagu in this county.

== Geography ==
Kimhyŏngjik is located in the northwestern part of the Kaema Plateau. It borders China to the north (Yalu River region). Although the south is a plateau region, the Yalu River is in the north. The Hŭisaekpong and Rangrim mountain ranges are partly in this county. The highest peak is Hŭisaek-pong. The region bordering on the Yalu River is mainly precipices. The main streams are the Yalu River and its tributaries. The county's land area is 93% forested.

== Administrative divisions ==
Kimghyŏngjik county is divided into 1 ŭp (town), 6 rodongjagu (workers' districts) and 9 ri (villages):

- Kimhyŏngjik-ŭp (김형직읍)
- Koŭp-rodongjagu (고읍로동자구)
- Namsa-rodongjagu (남사로동자구)
- Rongrim-rodongjagu (록림로동자구)
- Ro'tal-lodongjagu (로탄로동자구)
- Wŏltal-lodongjagu (월탄로동자구)
- Yŏnp'o-rodongjagu (연포로동자구)
- Chukchŏl-li (죽전리)
- Kŭmch'ang-ri (금창리)
- Much'ang-ri (무창리)
- Pujŏl-li (부전리)
- Rajung-ri (라죽리)
- Ryŏnha-ri (련하리)
- Ryŏnsong-ri (련송리)
- Taeŭng-ri (대응리)
- Tuji-ri (두지리)

== Economy ==
Forestry is the main industry, taking up 50% of the industrial output. The main rivers are used to transport timber. Iron, gold, silver, copper, tungsten, graphite and nickel deposits are found in the county. Agriculture is also practised with the majority of it in Koup-rodongjagu, Rajung-ri, Yonpo-rodongjagu, Chukchol-ri and Woltal-rodongjagu, while rice paddies are mostly in Kimhyongjik-up, Muchang-ri, Koup-rodongjagu and Rajung-ri, along the Yalu River. Red pepper, corn, beans, potatoes, rice and flax are mainly produced. Sericulture is also practised. Most of corn and rice produced in Ryanggang Province are produced in this county.

There are various schools and healthcare facilities in the county. There is also a children's palace in the county.

The Huchang Mine No. 4 power station started to be built on 25 July 2021 and was completed on 23 September 2021. The completion of the power plant allows the normalisation of production at the Huchang Mine.

== Transportation ==
The Pukbunaeryuk Line of the Korean State Railway and various roads serve the county.

A road from Sinuiju to Uam-ri, Rason and a road from Kimhyonjik-up to Kanggye runs through the county.

== See also ==
- Geography of North Korea
