= Kimjongsuk County =

Coordinates: 41°24′28.8″N 127°45′54″E

Kim Jong Suk County 김정숙군
- County

Korean transcription(s)
  - Chosŏn'gŭl: 김정숙군
  - Hanja: 金貞淑郡
  - McCune-Reischauer: Kimjŏngsuk-kun
  - Revised Romanization: Gimjeongsuk-gun
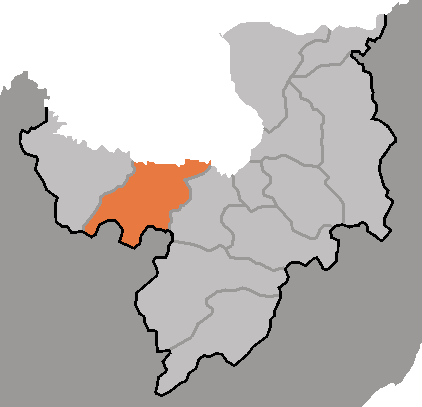
- Map of Ryanggang showing the location of Kimjongsuk
- Country: North Korea
- Province: Ryanggang
- Administrative divisions: 1 ŭp, 2 workers' districts, 22 ri

Area
  - Total: 1,228 km^{2} (474 sq mi)

Population (2008)
  - Total: 42,618
  - Density: 34.71/km^{2} (89.89/sq mi)

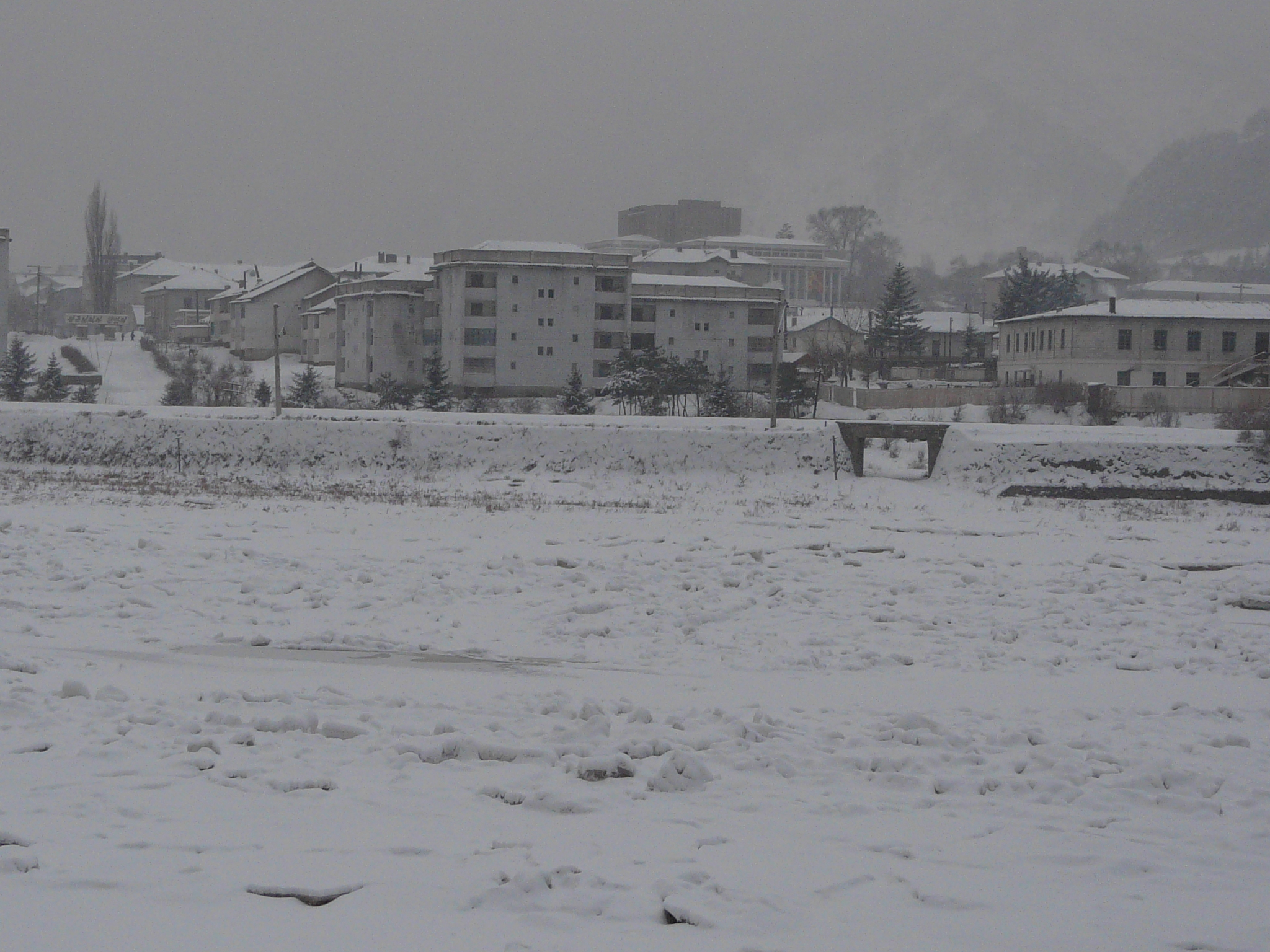
Kimjongsuk County

Kimjongsuk County is a kun, or county, in Ryanggang province, North Korea, along the Yalu River.

The Sinpa Revolutionary Site there is associated with Kim Jong Suk's underground political activities there during the anti-Japanese struggle.

== History ==
Originally part of Samsu, the county was made into a separate entity in 1952, using Samso myeon, Samsu myon, Chaso myon, and Insan ri of Hoin myon. The county was initially known as Sinpa, meaning "New Galpa", adding the new in the name to differentiate from the Old town of Galpa. The Old town name of Galpa meant the town had plenty of Kudzu vines, known as "Gal(葛)" in Hanja. Other theories suggest the name Singalpa is named after a person who made military contributions to the fight against foreign enemies. The county was renamed in 1981 after Kim Jong Suk, the mother of Kim Jong Il.

== Geography ==
Kimjŏngsuk lies in the northern portion of the Kaema Plateau, and slopes downward toward the north. The Changjin River flows through the county, which is traversed by the Puksubaek Mountains and Huisaekbong Mountains. The highest point is Huisaekbong itself, 2185 m. Some 92% of the county's area is forestland. The chief rivers are the Yalu and the Changjin. The climate varies, with extremely cold temperatures prevailing in the south, and 3-3.5 °C warmer temperatures along the Yalu in the north.

== Administrative divisions ==
Kimjŏngsuk county is divided into 1 ŭp (town), 2 rodongjagu (workers' districts) and 22 ri (villages):

- Kimjŏngsuk-ŭp (김정숙읍)
- Ryongha-rodongjagu (룡하로동자구)
- Sinhŭng-rodongjagu (신흥로동자구)
- Changhang-ri (장항리)
- Chasŏ-ri (자서리)
- Chip'ung-ri (저풍리)
- Ch'abo-ri (차보리)
- Hawŏndong-ri (하원동리)
- Hwangch'ŏl-li (황철리)
- Kangha-ri (강하리)
- Kŏryong-ri (거룡리)
- Moksŏ-ri (목서리)
- P'odŏng-ri (포덕리)
- P'ungyang-ri (풍양리)
- Samp'odong-ri (삼포동리)
- Samsŏ-ri (삼서리)
- Sangdae-ri (상대리)
- Sinsang-ri (신상리)
- Sŏkp'yŏng-ri (석평리)
- Sŏngdong-ri (성동리)
- Songji-ri (송지리)
- Songjŏl-li (송전리)
- Toryongdŏng-ri (도룡덕리)
- T'aeyang-ri (태양리)
- Wŏndong-ri (원동리)

== Economy ==
The chief local industry is logging; there is little agriculture, except for some rice cultivation along the Yalu. A certain amount of wheat, maize, soybeans, and potatoes are also produced. There are local deposits of molybdenum, gold, copper, silver, lead, zinc and tungsten. Honeybees and other livestock are also raised. Hydropower is abundant. Food processing dominates local manufacturing.

== Transportation ==
The county is served by both road and rail, with the Pukbunaeryuk Line of the Korean State Railway passing through the county.

== See also ==
- Geography of North Korea
- Administrative divisions of North Korea
