= Manpo =

Manpo 만포시
- Municipal City
- Manpho

Korean transcription(s)
  - Chosŏn'gŭl: 만포시
  - Hancha: 滿浦市
  - McCune-Reischauer: Manp'o si
  - Revised Romanization: Manpo-si
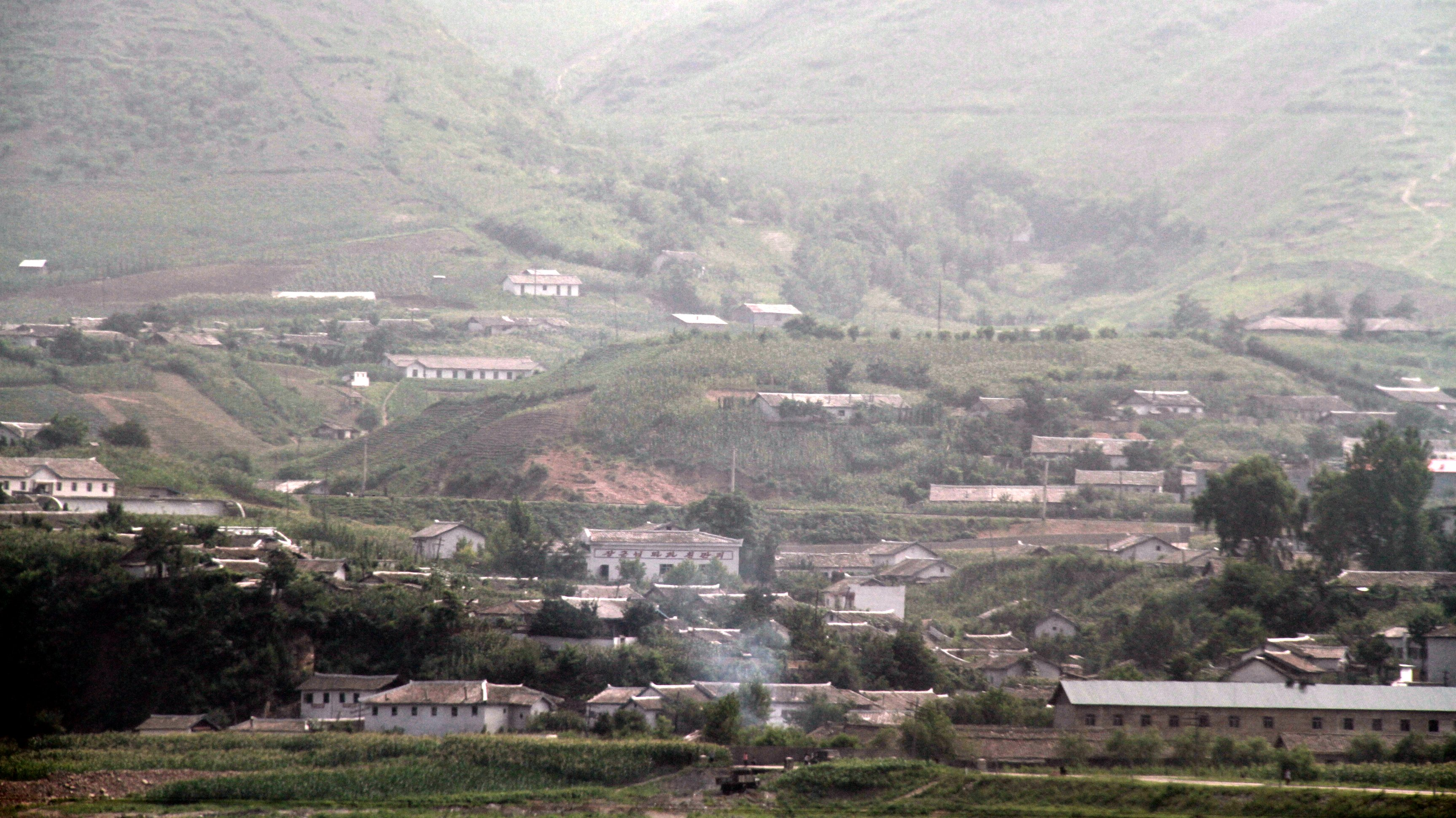
- View of Manpo from the Ji'an Yalu River Border Railway Bridge

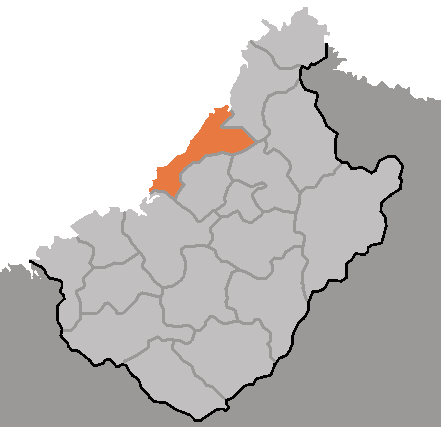
- Map of Chagang showing the location of Manpo
- Interactive map of Manpo
- Location within North Korea
- Coordinates: 41.157°N 126.290°E
- Country: North Korea
- Province: Chagang Province
- Administrative divisions: 11 tong, 15 ri

Government
  - Party Chairman of Manpo: O Myong Chol

Population (2008)
  - Total: 116,760
  - Dialect: P'yŏngan
- Time zone: UTC+9 (Pyongyang Time)

Manpo (Korean pronunciation: [man.pʰo]) is a city of northwestern Chagang Province, North Korea. As of 2008, it had an estimated population of 116,760. It looks across the border to the city of Ji'an, Jilin province, China.

== History ==
Manp'o was incorporated as a city in October 1967. Earlier, in October 1949, it had been combined into a single county consisting Manpo-myon, Kosan-myon, Oegwi-myon, Iso-myon and Sijung-myon, which were split from Kanggye-gun. Manpo had first been mentioned in 1424, in the Veritable Records of the Joseon Dynasty. During the Joseon Dynasty, fortresses and camps were built in this area, for which the city is now named after.

== Geography ==
Along the shores of the Yalu River, which various tributaries flow into, and the Kŏnp'o River are the small Kosan Plain and the Kŏnha Plain.

The majority of Manpo is located at a lower height than the rest of Jagang Province, though the northeast and east do have areas of higher elevation, which gradually slopes down to the much lower areas along the banks of the Yalu River. Around 75.6% of the city is covered by forests.

=== Climate ===
Manpo has a humid continental climate (Köppen climate classification: Dwa).

The yearly average temperature is 6.5 °C (43.7 °F); the January average temperature, −14.4 °C (6.1 °F); and the July average temperature, 23.6 °C (74.5 °F). The yearly average rainfall is 947.8 millimetres (37.31 in), generous due to the mountainous terrain.

Climate data for Manpo
Month	Jan	Feb	Mar	Apr	May	Jun	Jul	Aug	Sep	Oct	Nov	Dec	Year
Mean daily maximum °C (°F)	−6.3 (20.7)	−1.9 (28.6)	5.9 (42.6)	15.8 (60.4)	22.6 (72.7)	26.2 (79.2)	28.3 (82.9)	27.8 (82.0)	22.2 (72.0)	15.4 (59.7)	4.9 (40.8)	−4.0 (24.8)	13.1 (55.5)
Daily mean °C (°F)	−12.9 (8.8)	−8.6 (16.5)	0.2 (32.4)	8.8 (47.8)	15.4 (59.7)	20.1 (68.2)	23.4 (74.1)	22.9 (73.2)	16.2 (61.2)	8.8 (47.8)	−0.1 (31.8)	−9.4 (15.1)	7.1 (44.7)
Mean daily minimum °C (°F)	−19.5 (−3.1)	−15.2 (4.6)	−5.5 (22.1)	1.9 (35.4)	8.3 (46.9)	14.0 (57.2)	18.6 (65.5)	18.0 (64.4)	10.3 (50.5)	2.2 (36.0)	−5.1 (22.8)	−14.8 (5.4)	1.1 (34.0)
Average precipitation mm (inches)	11 (0.4)	13 (0.5)	20 (0.8)	51 (2.0)	71 (2.8)	116 (4.6)	236 (9.3)	220 (8.7)	90 (3.5)	44 (1.7)	33 (1.3)	16 (0.6)	921 (36.2)
Source: Climate-Data.org

== Administrative divisions ==
Manp'o is divided into 11 tong and 15 ri:

=== Neighborhoods (dong / tong) ===
MR Name	RR Name	Hangul
Kang'an-dong	Gangan-dong	강안동
Kogae-dong	Gogae-dong	고개동
Kunmak-tong	Gunmak-dong	군막동
Kuo 1-dong	Guo 1-dong	구오1동
Kuo 2-dong	Guo 2-dong	구오2동
Kwanmun-dong	Gwanmun-dong	관문동
Mun'ak-dong	Munak-dong	문악동
Ponghwa-dong	Bonghwa-dong	봉화동
Pyŏl'o-dong	Byeol-o-dong	별오동
Saemaŭl-dong	Saemaeul-dong	새마을동
Saemmul-dong	Saemmul-dong	샘물동
Segŏm-dong	Segeom-dong	세검동

=== Villages (ri) ===
MR Name	RR Name	Hangul
Hambu-ri	Hambu-ri	함부리
Kosal-li	Gosal-ri	고살리
Kŏnha-ri	Geonha-ri	건하리
Kŏnjung-ri	Geonjung-ri	건중리
Kŏnsang-ri	Geonsang-ri	건상리
Mit'a-ri	Mita-ri	미타리
Namsang-ri	Namsang-ri	남상리
Samgang-ri	Samgang-ri	삼강리
Sipridong-ri	Sipridong-ri	십리동리
Songhak-ri	Songhak-ri	송학리
Tŭnggong-ri	Deunggong-ri	등공리
Yŏnha-ri	Yeonha-ri	연하리
Yŏnp'o-ri	Yeonpo-ri	연포리
Yŏnsang-ri	Yeonsang-ri	연상리

== Economy ==
Lumber processing and transportation are well developed.

== Transportation ==
Man'po is connected to other cities in North Korea by road, and by the Unha, Manpo and Pukbunaeryuk lines of the Korean State Railway.

A new trolleybus line opened with its first phase in December 2019 from Kunmak-dong to Pyolo-dong. The total length is around 5 km.

== See also ==
- Geography of North Korea
