= Huju Chongnyon station =

Railway station in North Korea

Huju Ch'ŏngnyŏn 후주청년
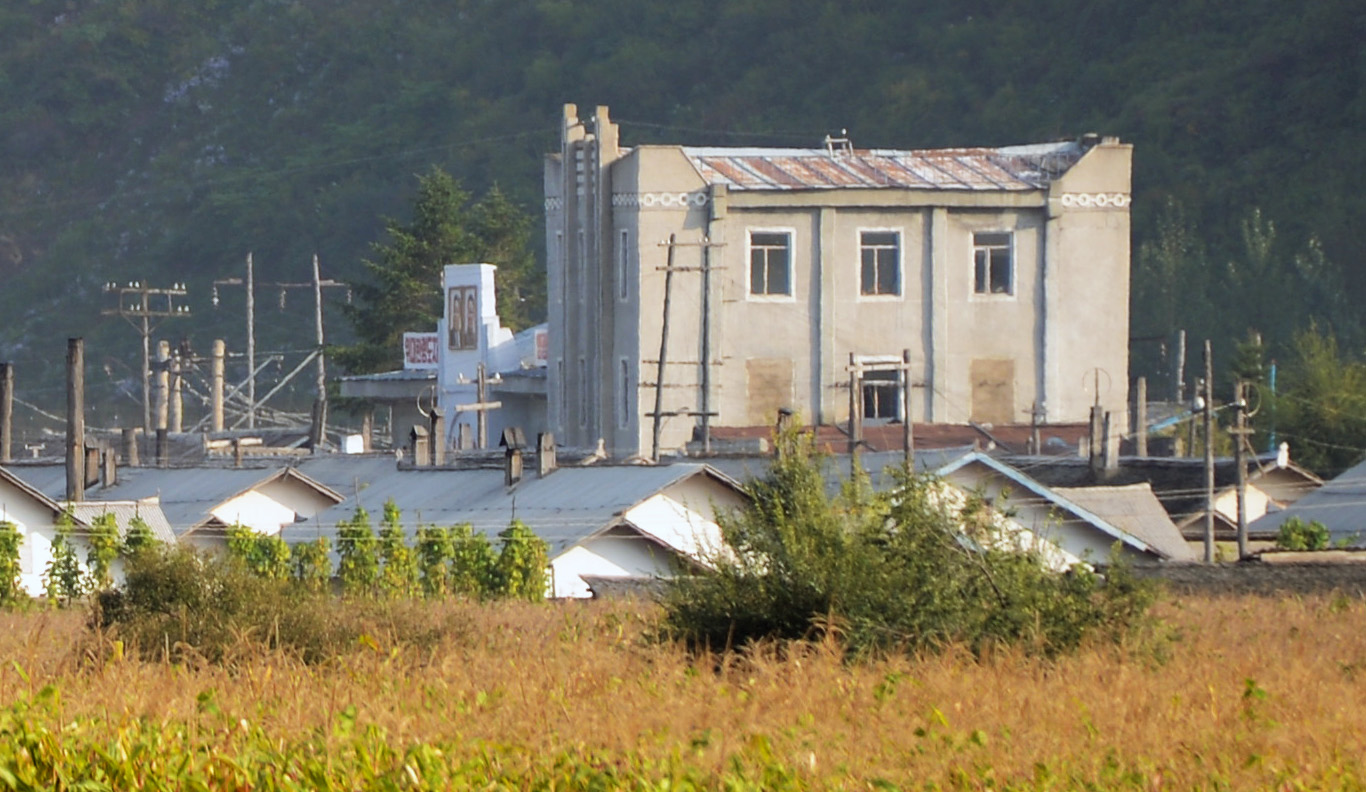
- Huju Ch'ŏngnyŏn station

Korean name
- Hangul: 후주청년역
- Hanja: 厚州青年驛
- Revised Romanization: Huju Cheongnyeon-nyeok
- McCune–Reischauer: Huju Ch'ŏngnyŏn-nyŏk

General information
- Location: Koŭp-rodongjagu, Kimhyŏngjik-kun, Ryanggang Province; North Korea
- Coordinates: 41.4627°N 127.4956°E
- Owner: Korean State Railway
- Line: Pukpu Line

History
- Opened: 27 November 1987
- Former names: Huju (후주, 厚州)

Services
Preceding station	Korean State Railway	Following station
Taeŭng towards Manp'o Ch'ŏngnyŏn	Pukbunaeryuk Line	Songjŏn towards Hyesan Ch'ŏngnyŏn
Location

Huju Ch'ŏngnyŏn station is a railway station in Koŭp-rodongjagu, Kimhyŏngjik-kun, Ryanggang Province, North Korea, on the Pukpu Line of the Korean State Railway.

== History ==
The station, originally called Huju station, was opened on 27 November 1987 by the Korean State Railway, along with the rest of the first eastern section of the Pukpu Line between Huju and Hyesan. It received its current name around 2012.
