= Pukbunaeryuk Line =

Railway line in North Korea

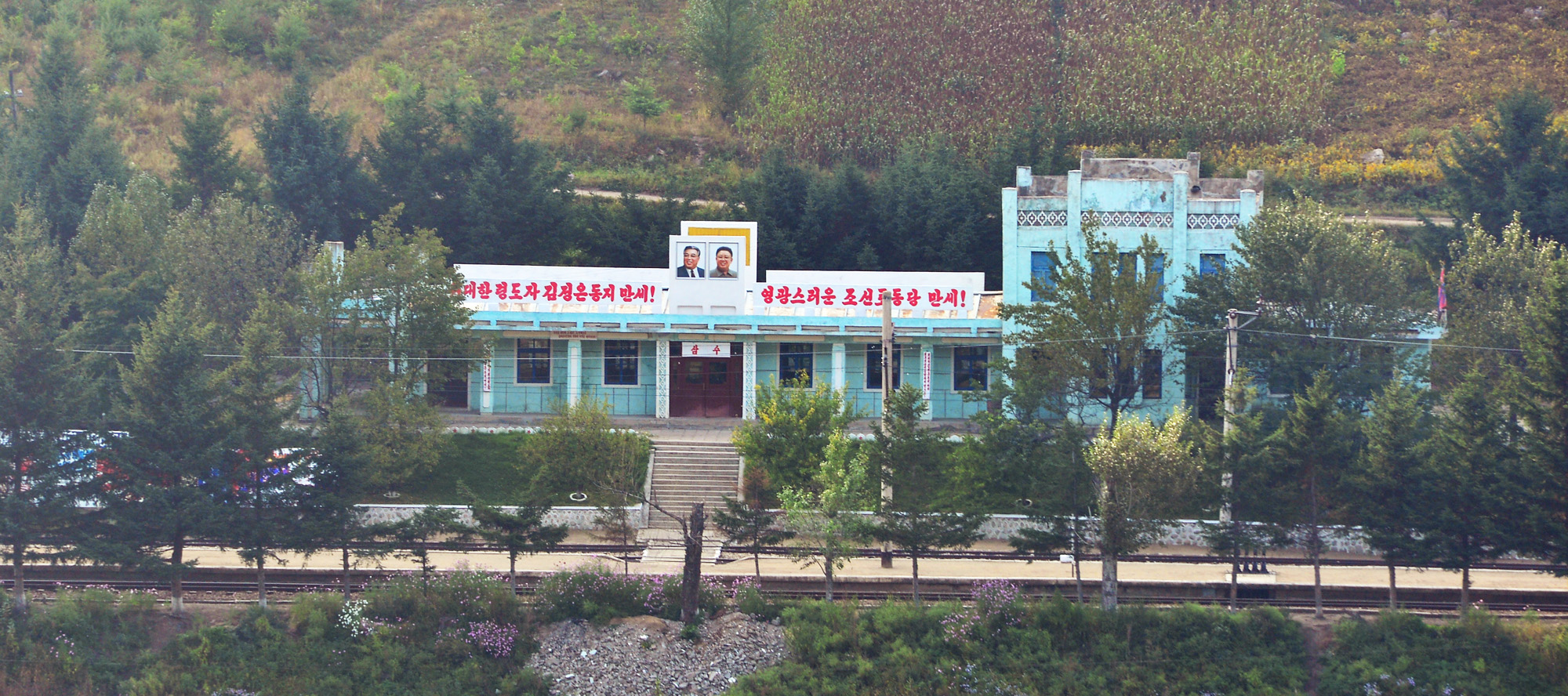
- Samsu Ch'ŏngnyŏn Station on the Pukpu Line

Overview
- Other names: Hyesan–Manp'o Ch'ŏngnyŏn Line 혜산만포청년선(惠山滿浦靑年線)
- Native name: 북부내륙선(北部內陸線)
- Owner: Korean State Railway
- Locale: Chagang; Ryanggang
- Termini: Manp'o Ch'ŏngnyŏn; Hyesan Ch'ŏngnyŏn Hoeryŏng Ch'ŏngnyŏn - planned/unrealised
- Stations: 42

Service
- Type: heavy rail, Regional rail
- Operator(s): Korean State Railway
- Depot(s): Manp'o, Hyesan; P'op'yŏng

History
- Opened: Unbong Line (Manp'o–Unbong): 1959; 66 years ago Unbong–Hyesan: 1987–1988; 37 years ago

Technical
- Line length: 249.2 km (154.8 mi)
- Number of tracks: Single track
- Track gauge: 1,435 mm (4 ft 8 1/2 in) standard gauge
- Electrification: 3000 V DC Catenary
Route map
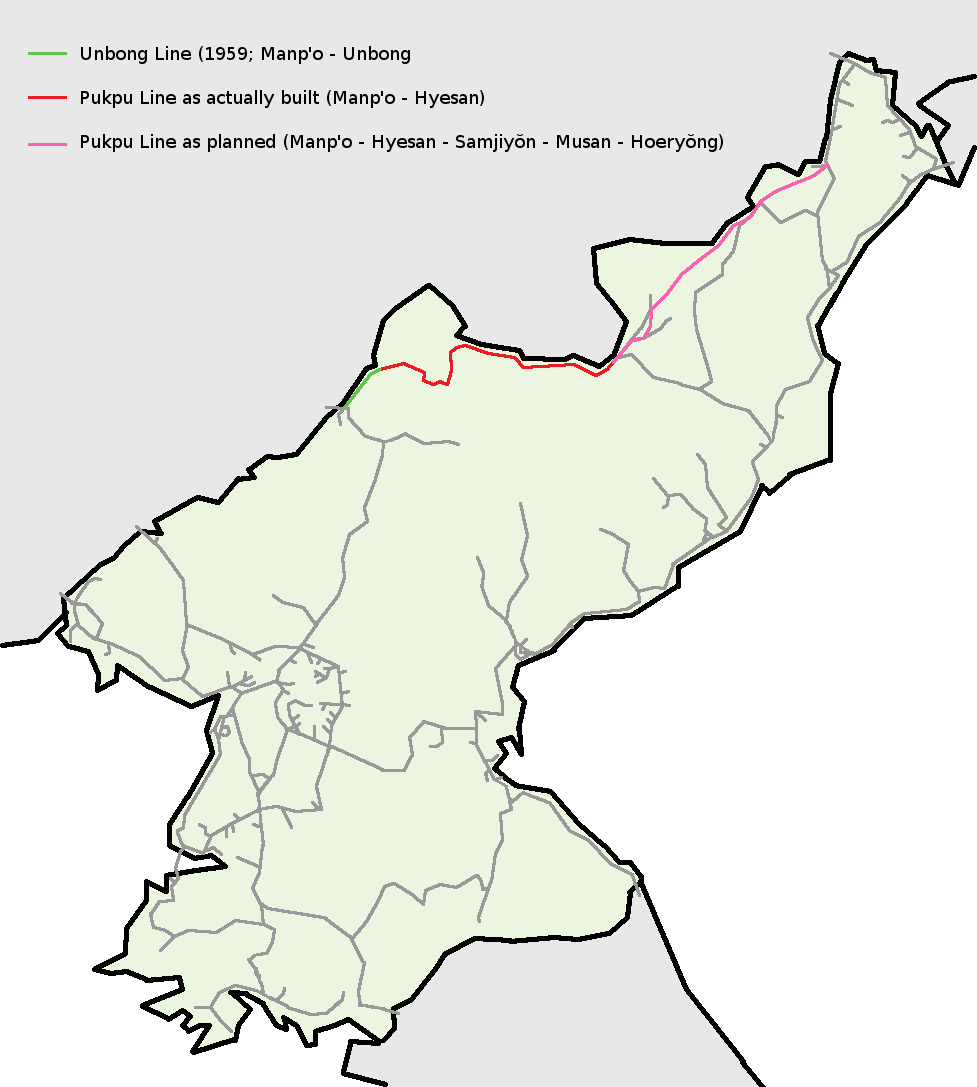

- Pukbunaeryuk Line
- Hangul: 북부내륙선
- Hanja: 北部內陸線
- RR: Bukbunaeryukseon
- MR: Pukpunaeryuksŏn

The Pukbunaeryuk Line, also called the Hyesan–Manp'o Ch'ŏngnyŏn Line after the only completed stage of three planned stages, is an electrified standard-gauge secondary trunk line of the Korean State Railway in Chagang and Ryanggang Provinces, North Korea, connecting the Manp'o Line at Manp'o to the Paektusan Ch'ŏngnyŏn Line at Hyesan. It also connects to the China Railway Meiji Railway via the Ji'an Yalu River Border Railway Bridge between Manp'o and Meihekou, China.

The Pukbunaeryuk Line was to have been a northern east–west trunk line of 450 km (280 mi) on the Manp'o–Hyesan–Musan–Hoeryŏng route, but this plan has not been realised.

There are 42 stations on the line, of which Chasŏng, Hwap'yŏng, P'op'yŏng Ch'ŏngnyŏn, and Mint'ang are dedicated freight consolidation points; the stations of Chŏnp'yŏng, Tuji, Sinp'a Ch'ŏngnyŏn, Ryanggang Sinsang, and Insan are served only by passenger trains. The line has 76 tunnels totalling over 26 km (16 mi) in length, and 116 bridges with a total length of over 6.3 km (3.9 mi) - bridges make up 3.3% of the total length of the line, whilst tunnels account for 12.8% of the total route length.

There are locomotive facilities at Manp'o and Hyesan, and formerly at P'op'yŏng; Hyesan also has shops for maintenance of passenger and freight cars.

== History ==
Having been the only major east–west trunk line at the time, the P'yŏngra Line had become overly congested by the 1970s, as all east–west traffic - even that moving between the northwest and the northeast - had to travel via the P'yŏngra Line. To alleviate the burden, President Kim Il Sung ordered the construction of a new, northern east–west transversal line in August 1980. This line, which was to have made use of parts of existing lines where possible, in addition to newly built trackage, was to have connected Manp'o in the west with Hoeryŏng in the east. This would have resulted in the creation of a direct connections between the Manp'o Line in the northwest and the Hambuk Line in the northeast of the country, allowing traffic between these two areas to avoid the P'yŏngra Line. This would also have significantly shortened the travelled distances.

The Pukbunaeryuk Line, as the planned line was called (북부, pukpu, means "northern"), was to have been built in three stages: Manp'o to Hyesan, Hyesan to Musan, and Musan to Hoeryŏng.

=== Stage 1: Hyesan–Manp'o ===
In 1959, the Korean State Railway opened the Unbong Line, a 45.6 km (28.3 mi) line from Manp'o to Unbong, to assist with the construction of the Unbong Dam on the Yalu River which had begun in October of that year. The first stage of the northern trunk line, from Manp'o to Hyesan, made use of the entirety of the Unbong Line. A new passenger-friendly station was built at Unbong, called Sinunbong Station (="New Unbong Station") (the previous Unbong Station, which had been the terminus of the Unbong Line and, after the construction of the new line, became the terminus of the truncated Unbong Line, was later renamed Kuunbong Station - that is, "Old Unbong Station", and Sinunbong Station became simply Unbong Station). Work on the first stage was started at both ends in 1981; construction went slowly, with the 17.9 km (11.1 mi) from Sinunbong to Chasŏng and the 83.2 km (51.7 mi) from Hyesan to Huju being completed only on 27 November 1987. Kim Jong Il ordered the formation of youth work brigades who, moving over 10,000,000 m^{3} (350,000,000 cu ft) of earth and blasting millions of cubic metres of rock, completed construction of the final 102.5 km (63.7 mi) section between Chasŏng and Huju in 1988.

=== Stage 2: Hyesan–Musan ===
A second stage, a 74 km (46 mi) long line from Hyesan to Musan on the Musan Line via Poch'ŏn, Samjiyŏn, Taehongdan and Musan counties was planned and construction was started, but was subsequently suspended. The line was to have shared the track of the Paektusan Ch'ŏngnyŏn Line from Hyesan to Wiyŏn; from there, the Wiyŏn–Karim section of the narrow-gauge Samjiyŏn Line and the Karim–Poch'ŏn section of the Poch'ŏn Line were to have been converted to standard gauge; from Poch'ŏn a new line would have been built to Rimyŏngsu, and from there, the Rimyŏngsu–Samjiyŏn–Motka section of narrow-gauge line was to have been regauged. From Samjiyŏn there was to be a new line built via Taehongdan town, Nongsa-rodongjagu, and Samjang-rodongjagu to Hŭngam on the Paengmu Line, from where the existing narrow-gauge line to Musan was to have been regauged.

=== Stage 3: Musan–Hoeryŏng ===
The third stage of the Pukbunaeryuk Line project was to have been the construction of a new 61 km (38 mi) line from Musan to Hoeryŏng on the Hambuk Line. From Musan, the line was to have run through Musan County along the Tumen River via Ch'ilsŏng-ri and Saegŏl-li, continuing from there along a newly built line to Yusŏn, the terminus of the Hoeryŏng Colliery Line; this line would have been absorbed into the Pukpu Line.

=== Present ===
The first stage had been completed at the end of 1988; by then, some works had begun on the second stage, but due to the DPRK's economic crisis of the 1990s, construction was eventually abandoned. Electrification of the existing portion of the line was begun in 1991 with the goal of completing it in time for Kim Il Sung's 80th birthday on 15 April 1992; however, it wasn't until 1993 that the electrification of the entire Manp'o–Hyesan line was completed.

By the end of the 2000s, the line was in such poor condition that the operation of trains was nearly impossible; citing this, in April 2011 Kim Jong Il once again mobilised work brigades of the Kim Il-sung Socialist Youth League to undertake the reconstruction of the line; the refurbishment work was completed in November 2013.

== Services ==
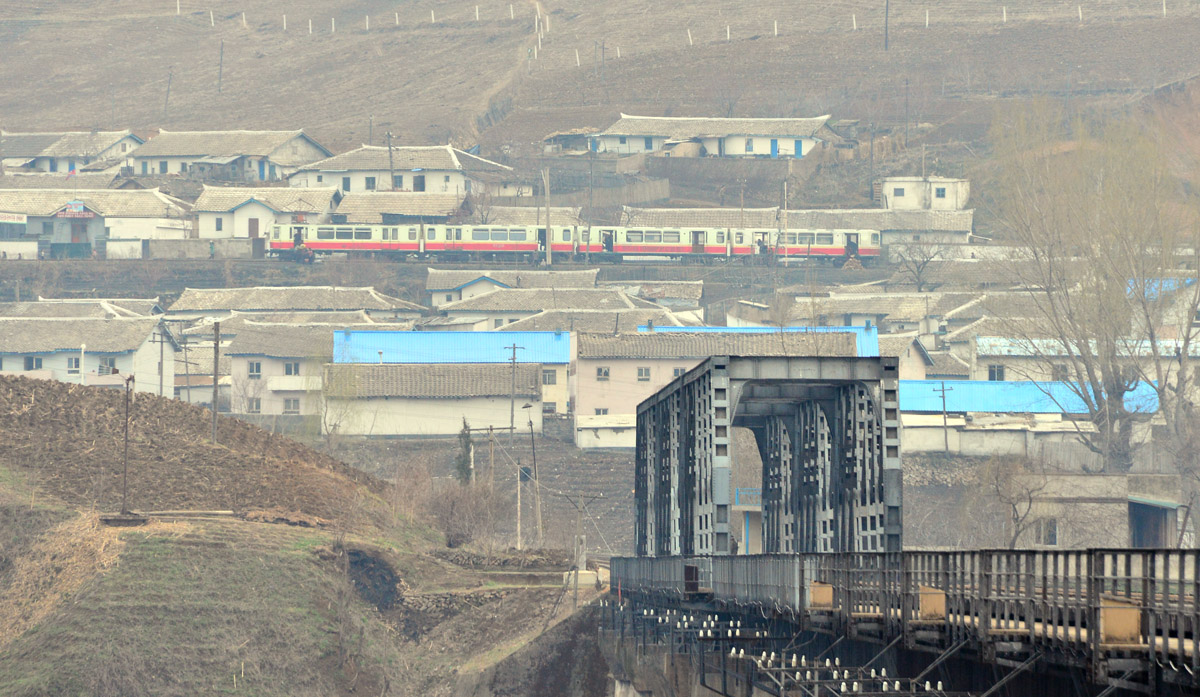
A 500-series trainset as a commuter train at Manp'o.

It is one of the lightest-travelled of all trunk lines in the DPRK. There are a number of passenger trains on the line, including commuter trains serving Rimt'o. Most of the freight traffic on the line is military, but logs are also transported along the line from the Kamae Plateau. Ore from the March 5 Youth Mine is delivered to Chasŏng Station for loading onto trains by means of a ropeway conveyor.

== Route ==
A yellow background in the "Distance" box indicates that section of the line is not electrified.

Distance (km)		Station Name		Former Name		
Total	S2S	Transcribed	Chosŏn'gŭl (Hanja)	Transcribed	Chosŏn'gŭl (Hanja)	Connections
0.0	0.0	Manp'o Ch'ŏngnyŏn	만포청년 (滿浦靑年)	Manp'o	만포 (滿浦)	Manp'o Line, Unha Line, China Railway Meiji Railway
4.6	4.6	Ch'agap'yŏng	차가평 (車家坪)			
8.3	3.7	Mun'ak	문악 (文岳)			An'gol Line
17.7	9.4	Yŏnp'o	연포 (煙浦)			
23.4	5.7	Rimt'o	림토 (林土)			
25.8	2.4	Ch'anggol	창골 (倉골)			Flag stop.
28.6	2.8	Simridong	십리동 (十里洞)	Oktong	옥동 (玉洞)	
35.8	7.2	Chagang Samgang	자강삼강 (慈江三江)			
41.0	5.2	Songsam	송삼 (松三)			Flag stop.
44.9	3.9	Sangp'unggang	상풍강 (上豊江)			Unbong Line
45.6	0.7	Unbong	운봉 (雲峰)	Sinunbong	신운봉 (新雲峰)	
53.4	7.8	Kujung	구중 (舊中)			
63.5	10.1	Chasŏng	자성 (慈城)			
68.8	5.3	Sahyang	사향 (麝香)	Chagang Sangp'yŏng	자강상평 (慈江常坪)	
74.3	5.5	Kwi'in	귀인 (貴仁)			Flag stop.
80.8	6.5	Chŏnp'yŏng	전평 (錢坪)			Flag stop.
83.2	2.4	Rip'yŏng	리평 (梨坪)			
87.8	4.6	Hwap'yŏng	화평 (和坪)	Chinsong	진송 (榛松)	
		Songdŏk	송덕 (松德)			Closed.
94.8	7.0	Hoejung	회중 (檜中)			distance from Hwap'yŏng
100.5	5.7	Ryongch'ul	룡출 (龍出)	Chagang Unjung	자강운중 (慈江雲中)	
108.1	7.6	Wŏlt'an	월탄 (月灘)	Unjung Huch'ang	운중후창 (雲中厚昌)	
113.7	5.6	Hoeyang	회양 (檜陽)			
121.4	7.7	Rot'an	로탄 (蘆灘)			
126.8	5.4	Ogubi	오구비 (五구비)			
134.7	7.9	Tuji	두지 (杜芝)			Flag stop.
138.2	3.5	P'op'yŏng Ch'ŏngnyŏn	포평청년 (葡坪靑年)	Huch'ang	후창 (厚昌)	
145.9	7.7	Much'ang	무창 (茂昌)			
151.5	5.6	Rajuk	라죽 (羅竹)			Flag stop.
155.8	4.3	Taeŭng	대응 (大鷹)			
166.0	10.2	Huju Ch'ŏngnyŏn	후주청년 (厚州靑年)	Huju	후주 (厚州)	
178.7	12.7	Songjŏn	송전 (松田)			
187.0	8.3	Kangha	강하 (江下)			
194.6	7.6	Sinp'a Ch'ŏngnyŏn	신파청년 (新坡靑年)	Sinp'a	신파 (新坡)	
200.0	5.4	Mint'ang	민탕 (珉湯)			
205.3	5.3	Ryanggang Sinsang	량강신상 (両江新上)			Flag stop.
212.5	7.2	P'ungyang	풍양 (豊陽)			
220.1	7.6	Sangdae	상대 (上臺)			
224.0	3.9	Insan	인산 (仁山)			Flag stop.
232.8	8.8	Samsu Ch'ŏngnyŏn	삼수청년 (三水靑年)	Samsu	삼수 (三水)	
240.3	7.5	Nŭpp'yŏng	늪평 (늪坪)			
245.1	4.8	Kanggu	강구 (江口)			
249.2	4.1	Hyesan Ch'ŏngnyŏn	혜산청년 (惠山青年)	Hyesan	혜산 (惠山)	Paektusan Ch'ŏngnyŏn Line
