= Ryanggang Province =

Province of North Korea

Ryanggang Province 량강도
- Province

Korean transcription(s)
  - Chosŏn'gŭl: 량강도
  - Hancha: 兩江道
  - McCune-Reischauer: Ryanggang-do
  - Revised Romanization: Ryanggang-do
- Coordinates: 41°24′00″N 128°11′00″E
- Country: North Korea
- Region: Kwannam
- Capital: Hyesan
- Subdivisions: 2 cities; 10 counties

Government
  - Party Committee Chief Secretary: Ri Tae Il (WPK)
  - Provincial People's Committee Chairman: Kim Chol Nam

Area
  - Total: 14,317 km^{2} (5,528 sq mi)

Population (2008)
  - Total: 719,269
  - Density: 50.239/km^{2} (130.12/sq mi)
- Time zone: UTC+9 (Pyongyang Time)
- Dialect: Hamgyŏng

Ryanggang Province (Ryanggangdo; Korean: 량강도; MR: Ryanggang-do, Korean pronunciation: [ɾjaŋ.ɡaŋ.do]) is a province in North Korea. The province is bordered by China (Jilin) to the north, North Hamgyong to the east, South Hamgyong to the south, and Chagang to the west. Ryanggang was formed in 1954, when it was separated from South Hamgyŏng. The provincial capital is Hyesan. In South Korean usage, "Ryanggang" is spelled and pronounced "Yanggang" (양강도; Yanggang-do, [jaŋ.ɡaŋ.do]).

== Description ==
Along the northern border with China runs the Yalu River and the Tumen River. In between the rivers, and the source of both, is Paektu Mountain, revered by both the Koreans and Manchurians as the mythic origin of each people. The North Korean government claims that Kim Jong-il was born there when his parents were at a Communist anti-Japanese resistance camp at the mountain. The North Korean-Chinese border for 32 kilometres (20 mi) east of the mountain is "dry, remote and mountainous, barely patrolled," making it one of the crossing areas for refugees from North Korea into China, although most, including refugees from Ryanggang itself, prefer to cross over the Tumen River.

Although all of North Korea is economically depressed after Soviet dissolution, Ryanggang province, along with neighboring North Hamgyong and South Hamgyong provinces, are the poorest, forming North Korea's "Rust Belt" of industrialized cities with factories now decrepit and failing. The worst hunger of the 1990s famine years occurred in these three provinces, and most refugees into China come from the Rust Belt region.

=== Ryanggang explosion ===
An explosion and mushroom cloud was reportedly detected in Kimhyŏngjik-gun on 9 September 2004, the 56th anniversary of the creation of North Korea. This was reported a few days later on 12 September.

=== Power supply issues ===
In recent years, power supply problems have become prevalent in Ryanggang.

== Administrative divisions ==
Ryanggang is divided into 2 cities (si) and 10 counties (kun). Each entity is listed below in English, Chosŏn'gŭl, and Hanja.

| Image | Name | Chosongul | Hanja | Population (2008) | Subdivisions |
|---|---|---|---|---|---|
City
| | Hyesan (capital) | 혜산시 | 惠山市 | 192,680 | 25 dong, 4 ri |
| | Samjiyon | 삼지연시 | 三池淵市 | 31,471 | 10 dong, 6 ri |
County
| | Kapsan County | 갑산군 | 甲山郡 | 70,611 | 1 up, 4 rodongjagu, 20 ri |
| | Kimhyonggwon County | 김형권군 | 金亨權郡 | 37,528 | 1 up, 1 rodongjagu, 17 ri |
| | Kimhyongjik County | 김형직군 | 金亨稷郡 | 57,729 | 1 up, 6 rodongjagu, 9 ri |
| | Kimjongsuk County | 김정숙군 | 金貞淑郡 | 42,618 | 1 up, 2 rodongjagu, 22 ri |
| | Paegam County | 백암군 | 白岩郡 | 67,683 | 1 up, 19 rodongjagu, 4 ri |
| | Pochon County | 보천군 | 普天郡 | 37,225 | 1 up, 2 rodongjagu, 17 ri |
| | Pungso County | 풍서군 | 豊西郡 | 44,112 | 1 up, 3 rodongjagu, 17 ri |
| | Samsu County | 삼수군 | 三水郡 | 40,311 | 1 up, 1 rodongjagu, 23 ri |
| | Taehongdan County | 대홍단군 | 大紅湍郡 | 35,596 | 1 up, 9 rodongjagu |
| | Unhung County | 운흥군 | 雲興郡 | 61,705 | 1 up, 10 rodongjagu, 10 ri |
