= Hyesan Chongnyon station =

Railway station in North Korea

Hyesan Ch'ŏngnyŏn 혜산청년

Korean name
- Hangul: 혜산청년역
- Hanja: 恵山青年驛
- Revised Romanization: Hyesancheongnyeon-yeok
- McCune–Reischauer: Hyesanch'ŏngnyŏn-yŏk

General information
- Location: Ch'un-dong, Hyesan-si, Ryanggang; North Korea
- Coordinates: 41.3972°N 128.1691°E
- Owner: Korean State Railway
- Lines: Paektusan Ch'ŏngnyŏn Line; Pukbunaeryuk Line
- Tracks: 7

History
- Opened: 1 November 1937; 88 years ago
- Former names: Chosen Government Railway; Hyesan

Services
Preceding station	Korean State Railway	Following station
Terminus	Paektusan Ch'ŏngnyŏn Line	Wiyon Chongnyon towards Kilju Ch'ŏngnyŏn
Kanggu towards Manp'o Ch'ŏngnyŏn	Pukbunaeryuk Line	Terminus
Location

Hyesan Ch'ŏngnyŏn station is the central railway station of Hyesan city, located in the Ch'un-dong neighbourhood of greater Hyesan city, Ryanggang province, North Korea. A large station with seven tracks, it is the junction point of the Korean State Railway's Paektusan Ch'ŏngnyŏn and Pukbunaeryuk lines.

== History ==
Originally called Hyesan station (Chosŏn'gŭl: 혜산역; Hanja: 恵山駅), the station, along with the rest of the Pongdu-ri-Hyesanjin section of the Kilhye Line, was opened by the Chosen Government Railway on 1 November 1937. It received its current name sometime after the 1970s.

In 1997 there was an accident at the station involving the collision of two trains.

== Services ==
Hyesan is a significant point for the movement of freight to and from various points in Ryanggang Province. There is also significant passenger traffic to and from Hyesan; in addition to various local trains on both the Paektusan Ch'ŏngnyŏn and Pukpu lines, there are express trains (1/2) to P'yŏngyang and (3/4) to West P'yŏngyang via Kilju, as well as semi-express trains between Hyesan and Kilju (101/102) and between Hyesan and Haeju via Kilju (104-107/108-111)
