= Manpo Chongnyon station =

Railway station in Manpo, North Korea

Manp'o Ch'ŏngnyŏn
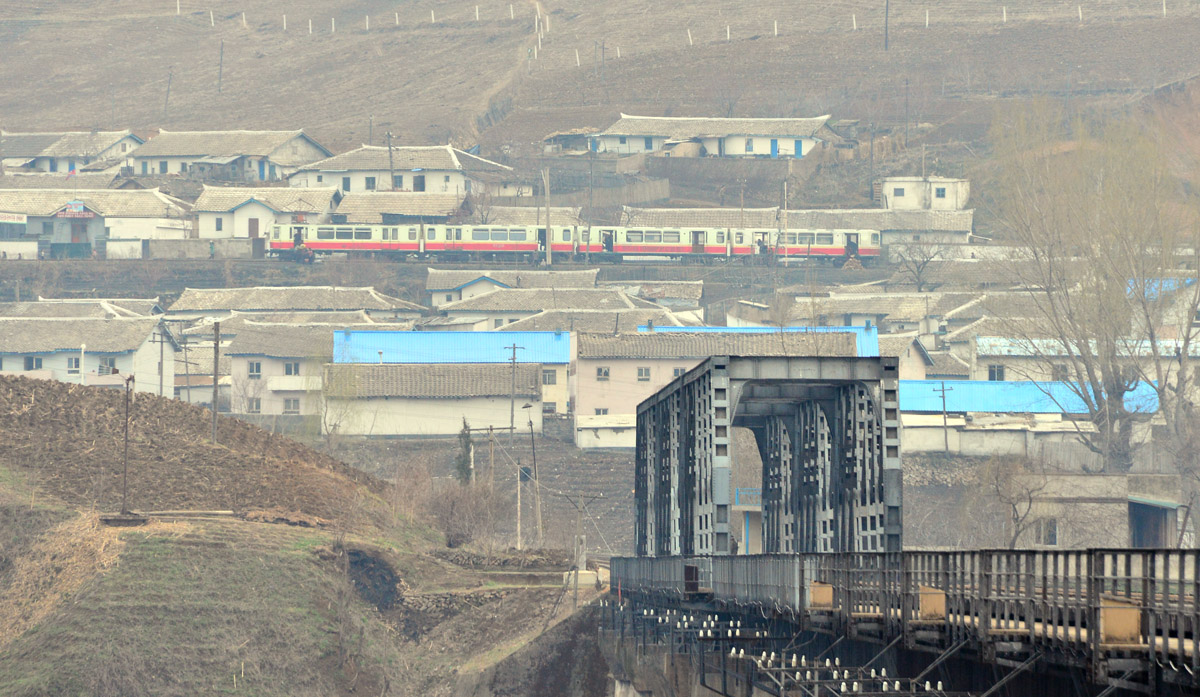
- Manp'o Ch'ŏngnyŏn station seen from Ji'an, China

Korean name
- Hangul: 만포청년역
- Hanja: 満浦青年驛
- RR: Manpo cheongnyeon-yeok
- MR: Manp'o ch'ŏngnyŏn-yŏk

General information
- Location: Manp'o-si, Chagang Province; North Korea
- Coordinates: 41.1518°N 126.2822°E
- Owner: Korean State Railway
- Lines: Manp'o Line; Pukbunaeryuk Line

History
- Opened: 1 February 1939; 87 years ago
- Original company: Chosen Government Railway

Services
Preceding station	Korean State Railway	Following station
Terminus	Pukbunaeryuk Line	Ch'agap'yŏng towards Hyesan Ch'ŏngnyŏn
Terminus	Manp'o Line	Kŏnha towards Sunch'ŏn
Terminus	Unha Line	Kuo towards Unha
Location

Manp'o Ch'ŏngnyŏn station is a railway station in Manp'o municipal city, Chagang Province, North Korea, on the Manp'o Line of the Korean State Railway; it is also the starting point of the Pukbunaeryuk Line to Hyesan and of the Unha Line to Unha.

== History ==
The station, originally called Manp'o station, was opened on 1 February 1939 by the Chosen Government Railway, along with the rest of the final section of the Manp'o Line from Kanggye to Manp'o. It received its current name after the establishment of the DPRK. With the opening of the Ji'an Yalu River Border Railway Bridge later in 1939 a connection was made with the South Manchuria Railway, and in October 1939 a P'yŏngyang-Jilin passenger train was put into service.

== Services ==
There is an express passenger service operating between Manp'o Ch'ŏngnyŏn and Haeju, two semi-express trains, between Manp'o and Hamhŭng and between Manp'o and Changyŏn, along with various commuter trains.

An international passenger service from Manp'o to Ji'an exists in the form of a single passenger car attached to the daily cross-border freight train. This train is not open to use by foreigners other than ethnic Koreans from China.
