= 20x10 Policy =

2024 regional development policy of North Korea

The Regional Development 20×10 Policy (Korean: 지방발전 20×10 정책) is a regional development program of the Democratic People's Republic of Korea announced in January 2024 under the leadership of Kim Jong Un. It aims to build modern industrial factories in 20 cities and counties per year over a 10-year period with the stated goal of improving living standards outside Pyongyang and reducing disparities between regions. In 2025, the program was expanded with the "Three Essential Projects" principle, adding plans to build public healthcare facilities, leisure facilities (including scientific and educational) and grain management facilities in target localities.

== Background ==
Regional inequality has been a recurring issue in North Korea since the economic crises of the 1990s, with resources disproportionately concentrated in Pyongyang and selected provincial centers. At the Eighth Congress of the Workers' Party of Korea in 2021, Kim Jong Un signaled a new emphasis on balanced regional growth, with Kimhwa County designated as a pilot site.

The "20×10" slogan was later adopted to encapsulate the nationwide expansion of this policy: 20 localities per year for 10 years, symbolizing both scale and long-term commitment.

== Objectives ==
Analysts and state media identify the main objectives of the 20×10 Policy as:

- industrial modernisation through the construction of modern light-industry factories producing food, clothing, paper, and other daily necessities,
- balanced development to narrow the gap between Pyongyang and rural provinces,
- integration of local factories with research and educational institutions,
- national self-sufficiency by reducing reliance on imports under sanctions,
- strengthening political legitimacy through visible economic projects, and
- regional self sufficiency of all cities and counties by laying a firm foundation for development.

== Implementation ==
The policy was formally launched at the Tenth Session of the 14th Supreme People's Assembly in January 2024.

Logistical implementation includes:

1. The reorganisation of a central committee mechanism for regional industrial modernization into a policy-focused "Non-Permanent Central Committee for Promoting Regional Development 20×10 Policy", responsible with promoting party-aligned projects and architecture.
2. Establishment of the "Non-Permanent Ministry of National Defence Group for the Regional Development 20×10 Policy", responsible for managing labor, building materials, and directing construction projects.
3. Mobilisation of Workers' Party and Korean People's Army units to provide labour, materials, and logistics (including creating a dedicated construction regiment).
4. Selection of the first 20 localities, including counties in Kangwon, South Pyongan, and North Hwanghae provinces, which began factory construction in 2024.

By early 2025, DPRK media reported on the completion of multiple facilities in the first batch of counties, including regional-industry factories which typically consists of: a foodstuffs factory, a garment factory, and a daily-necessities factory.

In February 2025, the WPK acknowledged that "the construction of regional-industry factories would not be enough to get rid of the age-old backwardness" of the rural regions, DPRK media reported. Thus, the authorities added the "Three Essential Projects" principle to the development program, which are to be pursued alongside the industrial projects. These projects consist of "healthcare facilities, leisure complexes and grain management facilities in all the cities and counties across the country". Kim Jong Un during the Ninth Congress of the WPK pushed for the implementation of the "Three Essential Projects" in 20 cities and counties every year "without fail", starting in 2026.

In practice with his predecessors, Kim Jong Un occasionally conducts field guidance or inspections of regional development policy construction projects in order to boost public morale and support the leadership's legitimacy. In 2025, he toured Kangdong, Sinyang, Pukchang, and Unsan counties' construction projects. In 2026, he supervised the construction projects in Ragwon County and noted that in order to further accelerate regional development, the 20×10 Policy should be "expanded and deepened in a gigantic way in the future".

== List of projects under the 20×10 Policy ==
=== 2024 (First year) ===
Locality	Province/Municipality	Project Type(s)	Status	Key Date(s)	Notes
Songchon County	South Pyongan Province	Regional-industry factories (Foodstuff; Garment; Daily-necessities)	Completed / Operational	Groundbreaking: 28 Feb 2024 Inauguration: 20 Dec 2024	First groundbreaking and inauguration under 20×10.
Sukchon County	South Pyongan Province	Regional-industry factories	Completed / Operational	Groundbreaking: 5 Mar 2024 Inauguration: 8 Jan 2025	
Onchon County (Nampo)	Nampo Municipality	Regional-industry factories	Completed / Operational	Groundbreaking: 5 Mar 2024 Inauguration: 20 Jan 2025	Products exhibited in Pyongyang.
Unpa County	North Hwanghae Province	Regional-industry factories	Completed / Operational	Groundbreaking: 6 Mar 2024 Inauguration: 10 Jan 2025	
Kyongsong County	North Hamgyong Province	Regional-industry factories	Completed / Operational	Groundbreaking: 6 Mar 2024 Inauguration: 12 Jan 2025	
Kusong City	North Pyongan Province	Regional-industry factories	Completed / Operational	Groundbreaking: 6 Mar 2024 Inauguration: 30 Jan 2025	Factories plus hospital project (2025) announced.
Orang County	North Hamgyong Province	Regional-industry factories	Completed / Operational	Groundbreaking: 6 Mar 2024 Inauguration: 31 Jan 2025	
Ichon County	Kangwon Province	Regional-industry factories	Completed / Operational	Groundbreaking: 6 Mar 2024 Inauguration: 9 Feb 2025	
Jaeryong County	South Hwanghae Province	Regional-industry factories	Completed / Operational	Groundbreaking: 7 Mar 2024 Inauguration: 7 Jan 2025	Early-2025 opening, part of 2024 tranche.
Unchon County	South Hwanghae Province	Regional-industry factories	Completed / Operational	Groundbreaking: 7 Mar 2024 Inauguration: 14 Jan 2025	Household goods shown at exhibitions.
Yontan County	North Hwanghae Province	Regional-industry factories	Completed / Operational	Groundbreaking: 7 Mar 2024 Inauguration: 16 Jan 2025	
Kujang County	North Pyongan Province	Regional-industry factories	Completed / Operational	Groundbreaking: 7 Mar 2024 Inauguration: 24 Jan 2025	Opened with mass events.
Kosan County	Kangwon Province	Regional-industry factories	Completed / Operational	Groundbreaking: 7 Mar 2024 Inauguration: 29 Jan 2025	
Tongsin County	Chagang Province	Regional-industry factories	Completed / Operational	Groundbreaking: 7 Mar 2024 Inauguration: 4 Feb 2025	Remote mountainous county.
Hamju County	South Hamyong Province	Regional-industry factories	Completed / Operational	Groundbreaking: 10 Mar 2024 Inauguration: 18 Jan 2025	
Jangpung County	Kaesong Municipality	Regional-industry factories	Completed / Operational	Groundbreaking: 10 Mar 2024 Inauguration: 1 Feb 2025	
Kumya County	South Hamgyong Province	Regional-industry factories	Completed / Operational	Groundbreaking: 10 Mar 2024 Inauguration: 3 Feb 2025	One of the larger year-one sites.
Unsan County	North Pyongan Province	Regional-industry factories	Completed / Operational	Groundbreaking: 10 Mar 2024 Inauguration: 7 Feb 2025	Garments shown at spring exhibitions.
Kim Hyong Jik County	Ryanggang Province	Regional-industry factories	Completed / Operational	Groundbreaking: 10 Mar 2024 Inauguration: 11 Feb 2025	Last of the Year-1 inaugurations.
Usi County	Chagang Province	Regional-industry factories	Completed / Operational	Groundbreaking: 11 Mar 2024 Inauguration: 25 Jan 2025	Clothing factory shown in official media round-ups.
Sinpo City	South Hamgyong Province	Offshore farm	Completed / Operational	Announced: 15 Jul 2024 Inauguration: 28 Dec 2024	Built as a model base of advanced offshore aquaculture under 20×10 according to DPRK media. Excluded from the 20 factories of the first year of the policy. Additional factories were built in 2025.

=== 2025 (Second year) ===
Locality	Province/Municipality	Project Type(s)	Status	Key Date(s)	Notes
Kangdong County	Pyongyang Municipality	Hospital; Leisure complex; Factories	Completed / Operational	Groundbreaking of hospital and leisure complex: 6 Feb 2025 Groundbreaking of factories: 28 Feb 2025 Guidance: 3 Jun 2025 Inauguration of hospital: 19 Nov 2025 Inauguration of factories and leisure complex: 15 Dec 2025	Flagship Year-2 project.
Ryonggang County (Nampo)	Nampo Municipality	Hospital; Factories	Completed / Operational	Groundbreaking: 9 Feb 2025 Inauguration: 29 Dec 2025	Planned Year-2 package per state media summaries. Last of the Year-2 projects to be inaugurated.
Sinyang County	South Pyongan Province	Regional-industry factories	Completed / Operational	Groundbreaking: 24 Feb 2025 Inspection: 3 Dec 2025 Inauguration: 15 Dec 2025	
Koksan County	North Hwanghae Province	Regional-industry factories	Completed / Operational	Groundbreaking: 24 Feb 2025 Inauguration: 20 Dec 2025	
Jongpyong County	South Hamgyong Province	Leisure complex; Factories	Completed / Operational	Groundbreaking: 24 Feb 2025 Inauguration: 25 Dec 2025	
Puryong County	North Hamgyong Province	Regional-industry factories	Completed / Operational	Groundbreaking: 25 Feb 2025 Inauguration: 15 Dec 2025	
Taegwan County	North Pyongan Province	Regional-industry factories	Completed / Operational	Groundbreaking: 25 Feb 2025 Inauguration: 15 Dec 2025	
Rangnim County	Chagang Province	Regional-industry factories	Completed / Operational	Groundbreaking: 25 Feb 2025 Inauguration: 15 Dec 2025	
Sinpo City	South Hamgyong Province	Regional-industry factories	Completed / Operational	Groundbreaking: 25 Feb 2025 Inauguration: 19 Dec 2025	Add-on to 2024 offshore farm project.
Sepho County	Kangwon Province	Regional-industry factories	Completed / Operational	Groundbreaking: 25 Feb 2025 Inauguration: 20 Dec 2025	
Kaepung District	Kaesong Municipality	Leisure complex; Factories	Completed / Operational	Groundbreaking: 25 Feb 2025 Inauguration: 26 Dec 2025	
Hwangju County	North Hwanghae Province	Grain management station; Factories	Under construction	Groundbreaking: 26 Feb 2025 Inauguration of factories: 16 Dec 2025	Major 2-part project within 20×10 scope.
Pukchang County	South Pyongan Province	Regional-industry factories	Completed / Operational	Groundbreaking: 27 Feb 2025 Guidance: 3 Dec 2025 Inauguration: 18 Dec 2025	Healthcare facilities and leisure complexes announced to be a focus in the coming year of the policy according to Kim Jong Un.
Changgang County	Chagang Province	Regional-industry factories	Completed / Operational	Groundbreaking: 27 Feb 2025 Inauguration: 18 Dec 2025	
Cholwon County	Kangwon Province	Regional-industry factories	Completed / Operational	Groundbreaking: 27 Feb 2025 Inauguration: 18 Dec 2025	Plans to expand production by directing efforts on materials for the factories was stated in a speech.
Paechon County	South Hwanghae Province	Regional-industry factories	Completed / Operational	Groundbreaking: 27 Feb 2025 Inauguration: 20 Dec 2025	
Kilju County	North Hamgyong Province	Regional-industry factories	Completed / Operational	Groundbreaking: 27 Feb 2025 Inauguration: 23 Dec 2025	
Yomju County	North Pyongan Province	Factories; Seafood processing facility	Completed / Operational	Groundbreaking: 27 Feb 2025 Inauguration: 26 Dec 2025	
Jangyon County	South Hwanghae Province	Regional-industry factories	Completed / Operational	Groundbreaking: 28 Feb 2025 Inauguration: 18 Dec 2025	
Kim Jong Suk County	Ryanggang Province	Regional-industry factories	Completed / Operational	Groundbreaking: 28 Feb 2025 Inauguration: 20 Dec 2025	
Kusong City	North Pyongan Province	Hospital	Completed / Operational	Groundbreaking: 24 Feb 2025 Inauguration: 13 Dec 2025	Add-on to 2024 factories.
Ragwon County	South Hamgyong Province	Offshore farm; Fishermen’s housing	Completed / Operational	Groundbreaking: 14 Feb 2025 Completion: 26 Aug 2025 Inauguration: 30 Aug 2025	Aquaculture project under 20×10. The site was officially named as Ragwonpho.
Unsan County	South Pyongan Province	Paper factory	Completed / Operational	Groundbreaking: 25 Feb 2025 Guidance: 3 Dec 2025 Inauguration: 28 Dec 2025	Built as a model factory under 20×10 in a plan by the WPK to build paper factories in "every province capable of satisfying their demand", according to DPRK media.

=== 2026 (Third year) ===
Locality	Province/Municipality	Project Type(s)	Status	Key Date(s)	Notes
Unnyul County	South Hwanghae Province	Hospital; Leisure complex; Factories	Under construction	Groundbreaking: 29 Jan 2026	First groundbreaking commencing the third year of the 20×10 policy.
Pyongwon County	South Pyongan Province	Hospital; Leisure complex; Factories	Under construction	Groundbreaking: 31 Jan 2026	
Sinuiju City	North Pyongan Province	Hospital; Leisure complex; Factories	Under construction	Groundbreaking: 3 Feb 2026	
Kangnam County	Pyongyang Municipality	Hospital; Leisure complex; Factories	Under construction	Groundbreaking: 3 Feb 2026	
Maengsan County	South Pyongan Province	Hospital; Leisure complex; Factories	Under construction	Groundbreaking: 3 Feb 2026	
Ragwon County	South Hamgyong Province	Factories; Hospital; Leisure complex; Greenhouse farm	Under construction	Groundbreaking of factories, hospital and leisure complex: 5 Feb 2026Guidance: 3 July 2026 Guidance including greenhouse farm: 18 November 2026	Factories are located in Sepho-Ri.
Songhwa County	South Hwanghae Province	Hospital; Leisure complex; Factories	Under construction	Groundbreaking: 6 Feb 2026	
Musan County	North Hamgyong Province	Hospital; Leisure complex; Factories	Under construction	Groundbreaking: 6 Feb 2026	
Taean District (Nampo)	Nampo Municipality	Hospital; Leisure complex; Factories	Under construction	Groundbreaking: 6 Feb 2026	
Panmun District	Kaesong Municipality	Hospital; Leisure complex; Factories	Under construction	Groundbreaking: 6 Feb 2026	
Sinpyong County	North Hwanghae Province	Hospital; Leisure complex; Factories	Under construction	Groundbreaking: 7 Feb 2026	
Sonchon County	North Pyongan Province	Hospital; Leisure complex; Factories	Under construction	Groundbreaking: 7 Feb 2026	
Pongsan County	North Hwanghae Province	Hospital; Leisure complex; Factories	Under construction	Groundbreaking: 8 Feb 2026	
Sijung County	Chagang Province	Hospital; Leisure complex; Factories	Under construction	Groundbreaking: 8 Feb 2026	
Sinhung County	South Hamgyong Province	Hospital; Leisure complex; Factories	Under construction	Groundbreaking: 8 Feb 2026	
Tongchon County	Kangwon Province	Hospital; Leisure complex; Factories	Under construction	Groundbreaking: 8 Feb 2026	
Hwapyong County	Chagang Province	Hospital; Leisure complex; Factories	Under construction	Groundbreaking: 9 Feb 2026	
Pyonggang County	Kangwon Province	Hospital; Leisure complex; Factories	Under construction	Groundbreaking: 9 Feb 2026	
Myonggan County	North Hamgyong Province	Hospital; Leisure complex; Factories	Under construction	Groundbreaking: 9 Feb 2026	
Samsu County	Ryanggang Province	Hospital; Leisure complex; Factories	Under construction	Groundbreaking: 9 Feb 2026	
Riwon County	South Hamgyong Province	Offshore farm; Fisherman's housing	Under construction	Groundbreaking: 9 Feb 2026Guidance: 17 November 2026	Additional project of the third year.

== Reception ==
State media described the policy as a “historic turning point” in socialism, promising a “great transformation” in people’s material and cultural life.

External analysts have raised concerns regarding feasibility (sustaining operations under sanctions), centralisation of decision-making in Pyongyang, selection of strategically significant counties over poorer areas, and the long-term sustainability of new factories.

According to 38 North, the program, if sustained, could represent one of the most ambitious regional development drives since the Chollima Movement of the 1950s.
