= Songgan County =

Songgan County 성간군
- County

Korean transcription(s)
  - Hanja: 城干郡
  - McCune-Reischauer: Sŏnggan kun
  - Revised Romanization: Seonggan-gun
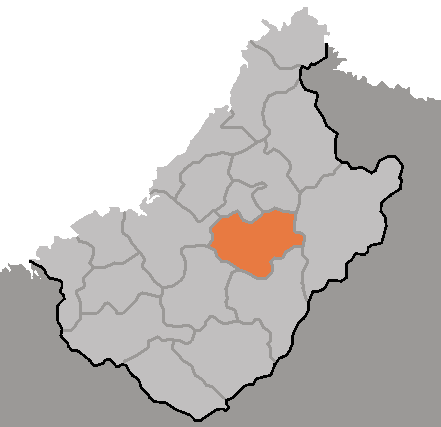
- Map of Chagang showing the location of Songgan
- Coordinates: 40°46′N 126°42′E
- Country: North Korea
- Province: Chagang Province
- Administrative divisions: 1 ŭp, 5 workers' districts, 9 ri

Area
  - Total: 950 km^{2} (370 sq mi)

Population (2008)
  - Total: 92,952
  - Density: 98/km^{2} (250/sq mi)

Songgan County is a kun, or county, in central Chagang province, North Korea. It borders Rangrim to the east, Wiwon to the west, Kanggye to the north and Chonchon and Ryongrim to the south. It was formed in 1952 from parts of Chonchon and Changgang, as part of a general reorganization of local government.

Songgan nestles among the Rangrim mountains in north central North Korea, its terrain sloping downward toward the Changja River in the west. The highest point is Maengbusan in the Rangrim range, which stands 2,214 m above sea level. 92% of the county's area is taken up by forestland.

The Manpo Line railroad follows the river through western Songgan. The county is also connected to Kanggye and Pyongyang by road. The chief local industries are logging and agriculture. Grains including maize, wheat, and millet are raised in Songgan, as are cattle and silkworms.

In July 2025 construction of a new structure in the form of x-shape was documented in a prison in the county located at 40°48′54″N 126°31′57″E.

== Administrative divisions ==
Songgan-gun is divided into 1 ŭp (town), 5 rodongjagu (workers' districts) and 9 ri (villages):

- Sŏnggan-ŭp 성간읍 (城干邑)
- Ch'angp'yŏng-rodongjagu 창평로동자구 (倉坪勞動者區)
- Oejung-rodongjagu 외중로동자구 (外中勞動者區)
- Sŏngha-rodongjagu 성하로동자구 (城下勞動者區)
- Sŏngryong-rodongjagu 성룡로동자구 (城龍勞動者區)
- Tongsal-lodongjagu 동산로동자구 (東山勞動者區)
- Kwangmyŏng-ri 광명리 (光明里)
- Much'ae-ri 무채리 (茂菜里)
- Musŏl-li 무선리 (舞仙里)
- Oesŏ-ri 외서리 (外西里)
- Paegam-ri 백암리 (白岩里)
- Paekcha-ri 백자리 (栢子里)
- Puji-ri 부지리 (富只里)
- Pung-ri 북리 (北里)
- Sinch'ŏng-ri 신청리 (新淸里)

== See also ==
- Geography of North Korea
- Administrative divisions of North Korea
- Chagang
