= Jong Chun-sil =

North Korean politician

- 정춘실

Supreme People's Assembly
- In office 11 November 1977 – July 2015
- Constituency: Jonchon

Personal details
- Born: December 29, 1941 Samrak-ri, Wiwon County, Jagang Province
- Died: July 2015, age 73/74
- Party: Workers' Party of Korea
- Awards: 1982 Order of Kim Il Sung; 1992 Order of Kim Il Sung; 1964 Labor Hero; 1986 Labor Hero

Korean name
- Hangul: 정춘실
- Hanja: 鄭春實
- RR: Jeong Chunsil
- MR: Chŏng Ch'unsil

Jong Chun-sil (a.k.a. Chong Chun-sil; 29 December 1941 – July 2015) was a North Korean politician, who was elected to the Supreme People's Assembly from 1977 until her death in 2015. In the 1960s, she managed a number of retail stores in Jonchon County, and was made famous for having a movement created in her name.

== Life ==
Jong Chun-sil was born in Samrak-ri, Wiwon County in 1941 as the daughter of a forestry worker. She attended a People's School and a middle school before 1949, and then attended the Jangang Province Commercial Worker Training Centre between 1949 and 1957. Afterwards, she then began working as a saleswomen and eventually a manager at the Jonchon Industrial Produce Store, then becoming a general manager at the general goods store in Jonchon-up, the main town in the county. She joined the Workers' Party of Korea in April 1961, after participating in a national commercial worker convention, where she received congratulation from Kim Il Sung.

Since 1969, she was the director of the Jonchon County Industrial Management Office. She wrote a book called "Our household notebook", which records the details of families who visit the store, such that better service could be provided to them. This was praised by Kim Il Sung when he visited Jonchon County, and similar notebooks were distributed to other stores. Kim Il Sung noted that this was an effective method to organise delivery of goods to families.

Later on, she decided to also produce food, rather than just selling it. This was achieved by raising animals, which her and the shop workers participated in. In the 1990s, as the supply of goods became increasingly tense, a new movement was created in her name, the Jong Chun-sil Movement to encourage people in the commercial sector to be more productive. She was praised in various news media, such as Rodong Sinmun as displaying exemplary working posture, and was how 'a revolutionary warrior should live and fight'. However, according to defectors, the movement lost meaning, as they allege that she was involved in corruption. The JoongAng Ilbo, a South Korean newspaper, criticised this movement for filling a mismatch between supply and demand by relying on the sincerity of workers to fulfil their quote, that problems with lack of goods could only be solved by relying on the 'hidden hero', who produces more than others.

Two films about her were made in 1991 and 2008, respectively.

She made a speech in occasion of the 60th anniversary of the founding of the DPRK.

Jong Chun-sil died in July 2015. Her death was marked by Kim Jong Un, who sent a wreath to express his condolences.

== Parliamentary career ==
She was first elected to the Supreme People's Assembly in 1977, to its 6th convocation. She was then subsequently elected to the 7th, 8th, 9th, 10th, 11th, and 12th Supreme People's Assembly.
