= Sijung County =

Sijung County 시중군
- County

Korean transcription(s)
  - Hanja: 時中郡
  - McCune-Reischauer: Sijung kun
  - Revised Romanization: Sijung-gun
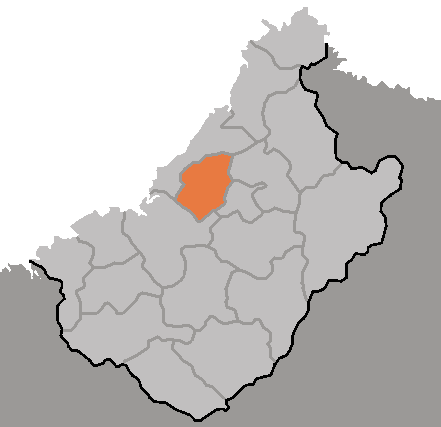
- Map of Chagang showing the location of Sijung
- Country: North Korea
- Province: Chagang Province
- Administrative divisions: 1 ŭp, 14 ri

Area
  - Total: 606 km^{2} (234 sq mi)

Population (2008)
  - Total: 41,842
  - Density: 69.0/km^{2} (179/sq mi)

Sijung County is a kun, or county, in Chagang province, North Korea. It borders Kanggye and Changgang to the east, Manpo to the north and west, and Wiwon to the south. Formerly part of Kanggye, Sijung became a separate county in 1952 as part of a general reorganization of local government.

The terrain of Sijung is steep and mountainous in the east, where the Kangnam Mountains rise, but slopes downward toward the west. The highest point is Sirubong in the south, at 1355 m above sea level. The Changja River flows through north through the county, making a number of spectacular sharp twists on its way to join the Yalu. A portion of this has been dammed to create a large reservoir.

Sijung is served by both road and rail, with the Manpo Line stopping in the county. The Changja River reservoir is also used to ship some goods by water. Local industry is dominated by agriculture and mining.

== Administrative divisions ==
Sijung County is divided into 1 ŭp and 14 ri:

- Sijung-ŭp 시중읍 (時中邑)
- Anch'al-li 안찬리 (安贊里)
- Chong'il-li 종인리 (從仁里)
- Ch'ŏnjang-ri 천장리 (天章里)
- Ch'ŏnsŏng-ri 천성리 (天城里)
- Hŭngpal-li 흥판리 (興判里)
- P'ungch'ŏng-ri 풍청리 (豊淸里)
- P'ungryong-ri 풍룡리 (豊龍里)
- Rinam-ri 리남리 (吏南里)
- Ronam-ri 로남리 (魯南里)
- Simgwi-ri 심귀리 (深貴里)
- Yaksu-ri 약수리 (藥水里)
- Yonghŭng-ri 영흥리 (永興里)
- Yŏnp'yŏng-ri 연평리 (延坪里)
- Sangch'ŏng-ri 상청리 (上淸里)

== See also ==
- Geography of North Korea
- Administrative divisions of North Korea
- Chagang
