= Unbong Line =

Railway line in North Korea

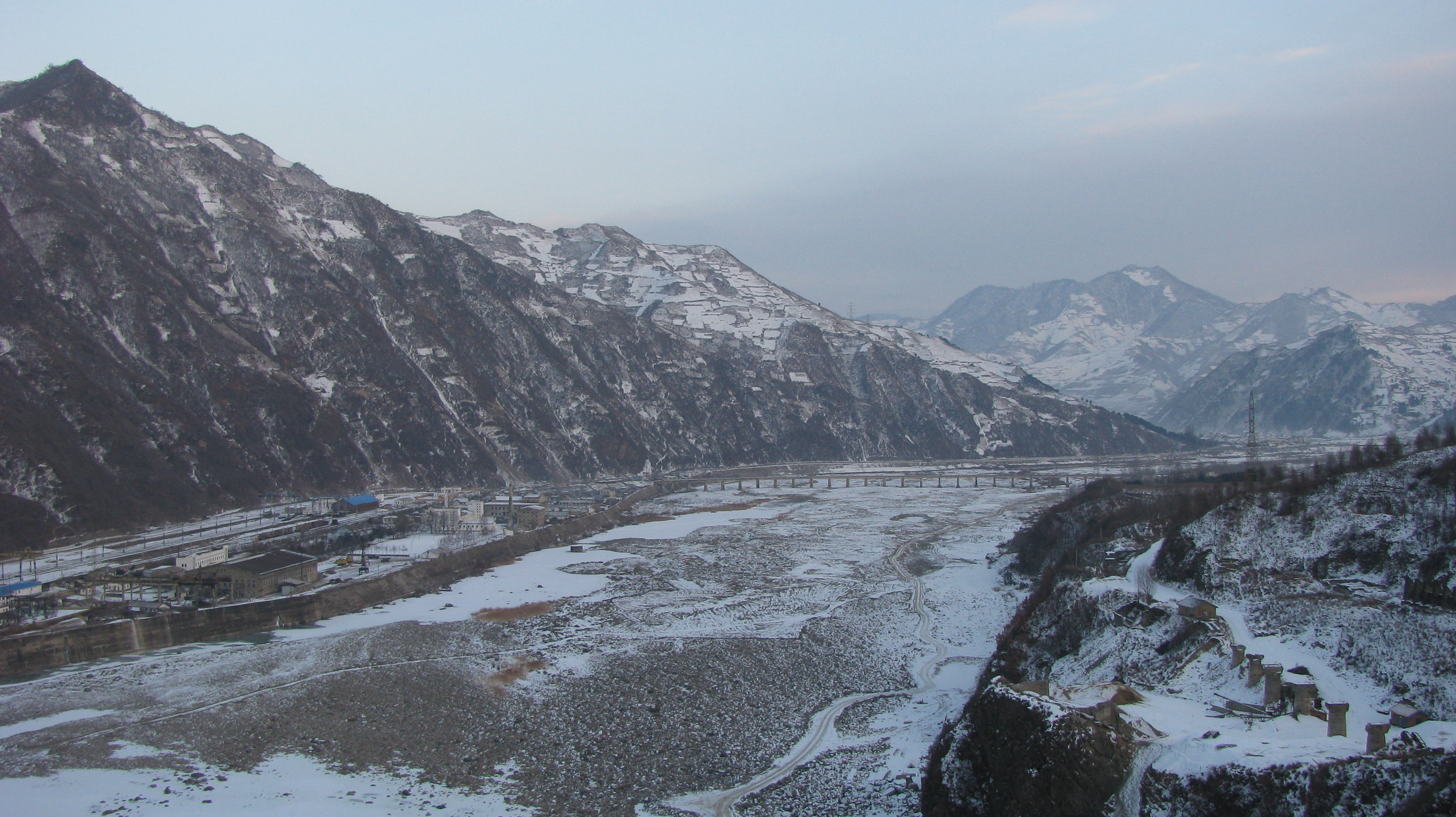
- Kuunbong Station and the (closed) bridge to the Chinese side; nearly all of the Unbong Line can be seen, with Sangp'unggang Station in the far right background.

Overview
- Native name: 운봉선 (雲峰線)
- Status: Operational
- Owner: Korean State Railway
- Locale: Unbong-rodongjagu, Chasŏng-gun, Chagang
- Termini: Sangp'unggang; Kuunbong
- Stations: 2

Service
- Type: Heavy rail, Freight rail

History
- Opened: 1959

Technical
- Line length: 3.4 km (2.1 mi)
- Number of tracks: Single track
- Track gauge: 1,435 mm (4 ft 8 1/2 in) standard gauge
Route map
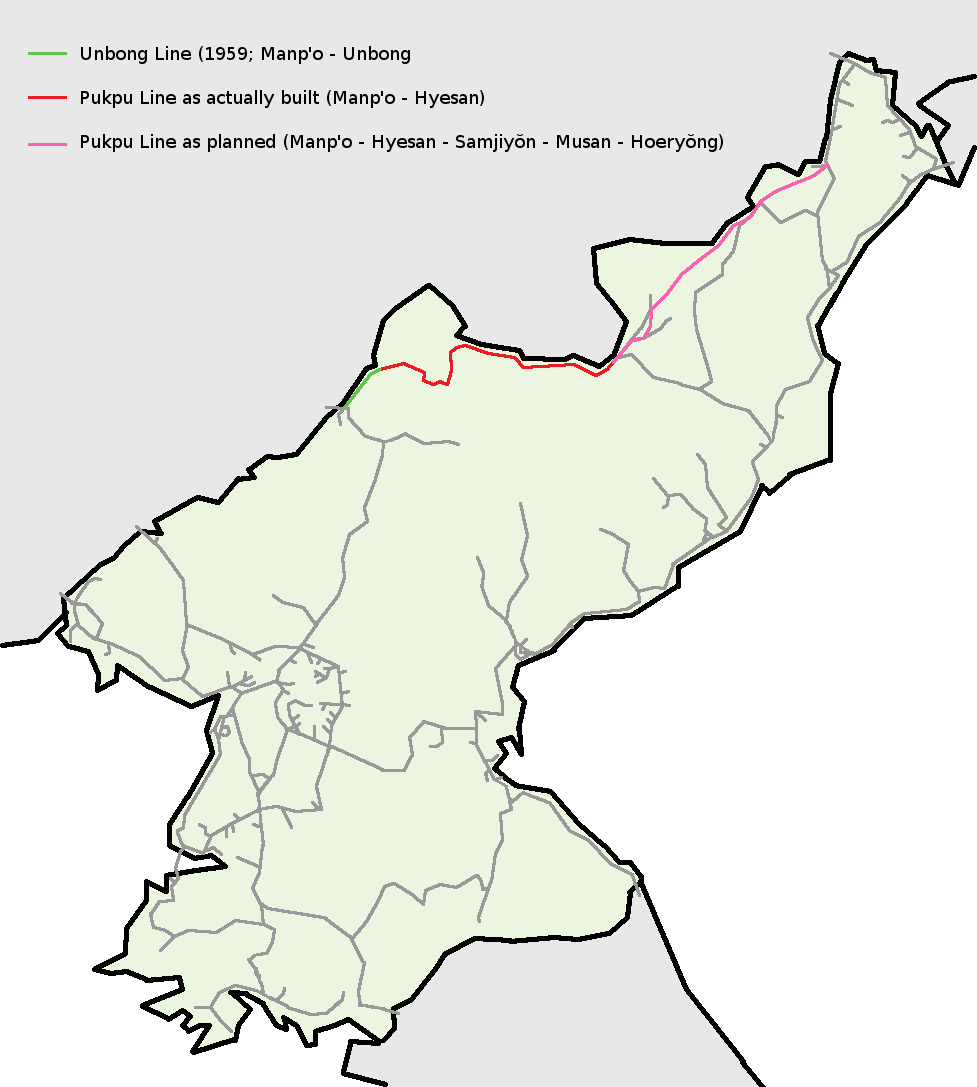

- Unbong Line
- Hangul: 운봉선
- Hanja: 雲峰線
- RR: Unbongseon
- MR: Unbongsŏn

The Unbong Line is a secondary railway line of the Korean State Railway located entirely within Unbong-rodongjagu, Chasŏng County, Chagang, North Korea, running from Sangp'unggang on the Pukbunaeryuk Line to Kuunbong.

== History ==
The Unbong Line was opened in 1959 by the Korean State Railway, originally running from Manp'o to its current terminus to assist with the construction of the Unbong Dam on the Yalu River which had begun in October of that year. In August 1980, President Kim Il Sung ordered the construction of a new, northern east-west transversal trunk line, to run from Manp'o on the Manp'o Line in the northwest to Hoeryŏng on the Hambuk Line in the northeast. To accomplish this, a plan was made to undertake construction of the 450 km (280 mi) line, to be called the Pukpu Line in three stages: Manp'o–Hyesan, Hyesan–Musan, and Musan–Hoeryŏng, making use of existing rail lines where possible - including conversion of narrow gauge lines, and building new lines where necessary.

It was decided that construction of the first stage would begin at Unbong, northeastern terminus of the Unbong Line from Manp'o, giving a 45 km (28 mi) jump by incorporating most of the existing Unbong Line into the new Pukpu Line. Work building the new line began in 1981; just before Unbong Station a junction was installed, where a new station was built, called Sinunbong Station (="New Unbong Station"), from where the new line would head towards Hyesan. Construction of the first stage was completed in 1988.

The absorption of most of the existing railway between Manp'o and Unbong cut back the Unbong Line to a 3.4 km (2.1 mi) stretch from the junction point with the new line, located at Sangp'unggang at the confluence of the Yalu and Samp'ung Rivers, to Unbong Station at the terminus of the old line, adjacent to the dam; this was transformed into a large freight-only yard, with Sinunbong Station handling primarily passenger traffic; the remaining section of the original 1959 line from Sangp'unggang to Kuunbong retained the "Unbong Line" name. At some point in time the stations traded names, with Sinunbong Station becoming the current Unbong Station, and the original Unbong Station becoming today's Kuunbong Station ("Old Unbong Station") - this might have happened either between 1991 and 1993, when electrification works of the Pukpu Line were completed, or between 2011 and 2013 when, in accordance with Kim Jong Il's order to refurbish the by then nearly decrepit Pukpu Line, work brigades of the Kim Il-sung Socialist Youth League rebuilt the entirety of the Manp'o–Hyesan line between April 2011 and November 2013; at that time, many other stations along the line were renamed, most to honour the youth work brigades in keeping with what had become a North Korean tradition since 1958, when Kim Il Sung gave the Sariwŏn—Haeju line - rebuilt by youth "volunteer" teams - the name of "Hwanghae Ch'ŏngnyŏn Line" ("Yellow Sea Youth").

== Route ==
A yellow background in the "Distance" box indicates that section of the line is not electrified.

Distance (km)		Station Name		Former Name		
Total	S2S	Transcribed	Chosŏn'gŭl (Hanja)	Transcribed	Chosŏn'gŭl (Hanja)	Connections
0.0	0.0	Sangp'unggang	상풍강 (上豊江)			Pukbunaeryuk Line
3.4	3.4	Kuunbong	구운봉 (舊雲峰)	Unbong	운봉 (雲峰)	
