= Kuunbong station =

Railway station in North Korea

Kuunbong 구운봉
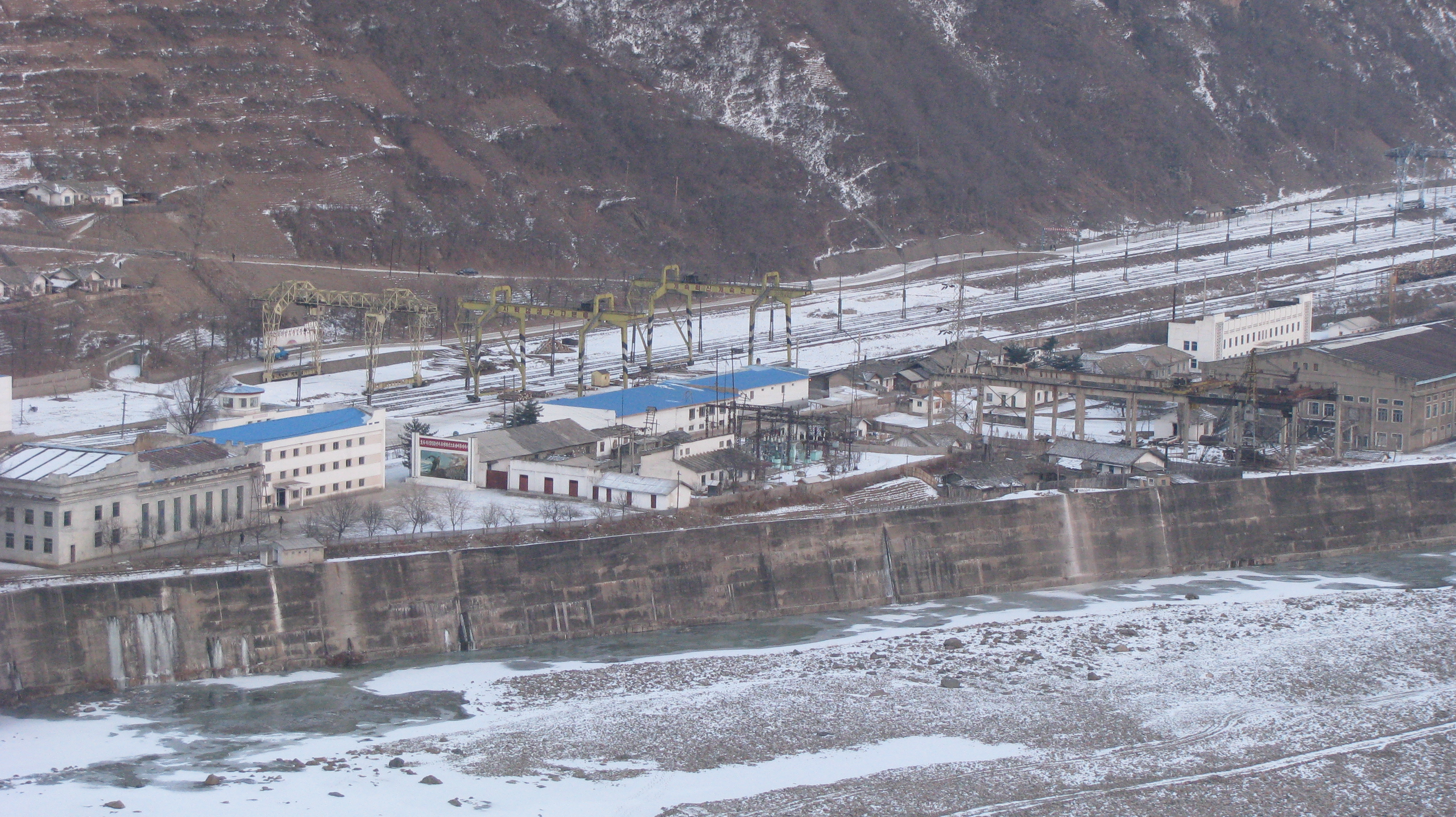
- Kuunbong station viewed from the Chinese side of the Chasŏng Dam.

Korean name
- Hangul: 구운봉역
- Hanja: 舊雲峰驛
- Revised Romanization: Guunbong-yeok
- McCune–Reischauer: Kuunbong-yŏk

General information
- Location: Unbong-rodongjagu, Chasŏng-gun, Chagang Province; North Korea
- Coordinates: 41°22′49″N 126°31′12″E
- Owner: Korean State Railway
- Line: Unbong Line

History
- Opened: 1959
- Former names: Unbong (운봉, 雲峰)

Services
Preceding station	Korean State Railway	Following station
Sangp'unggang Terminus	Unbong Line	Terminus
Location

Kuunbong station is a freight-only railway station in Unbong-rodongjagu, Chasŏng County, Chagang Province, North Korea; adjacent to the Chasŏng Dam on the Yalu River, it is the terminus of the Unbong Line of the Korean State Railway.

== History ==
The Unbong Line was opened in 1959 by the Korean State Railway from Manp'o to assist with the construction of the Unbong Dam on the Yalu River which had begun in October of that year; a large terminus station, named Unbong station, was opened on the Korean side of the construction site as the terminus of the line. When construction of the Pukpu Line was completed in 1988, the Manp'o–Sangp'unggang section of the Unbong Line was made part of the new line, and a new station was built near the centre of Unbong town for use by passenger trains, called Sinunbong Station.

The absorption of most of the original route into the Pukpu Line left the Unbong Line as a 3.4 km (2.1 mi) stretch from the junction point with the new line, located at Sangp'unggang, to the original terminus adjacent to the dam. This was transformed into a large freight-only yard, with the new Sinunbong station handling primarily passenger traffic. At some point in time the stations traded names, with Sinunbong station ("New Unbong station") becoming the current Unbong station, and the original Unbong station becoming today's Kuunbong station ("old Unbong station") – this might have happened either between 1991 and 1993, when electrification works of the Pukpu Line were completed, or between 2011 and 2013 when, in accordance with Kim Jong Il's order to refurbish the by then nearly decrepit Pukpu Line, work brigades of the Kim Il-sung Socialist Youth League rebuilt the entirety of the Manp'o–Hyesan line between April 2011 and November 2013; at that time, many other stations along the line were renamed, most to honour the youth work brigades in keeping with what had become a North Korean tradition since 1958, when Kim Il Sung gave the Sariwŏn–Haeju line – rebuilt by youth "volunteer" teams – the name of "Hwanghae Ch'ŏngnyŏn Line" ("Yellow Sea Youth").
