= Changgang County =

Coordinates: 41°07′29″N 126°46′44″E

Changgang County 장강군
- County

Korean transcription(s)
  - Hanja: 長江郡
  - McCune-Reischauer: Changgang kun
  - Revised Romanization: Janggang-gun
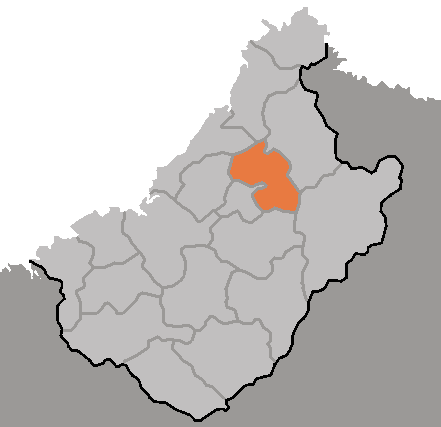
- Map of Chagang showing location of Changgang
- Country: North Korea
- Province: Chagang Province
- Administrative divisions: 1 ŭp, 3 workers' districts, 10 ri

Area
  - Total: 740 km^{2} (290 sq mi)

Population (2008)
  - Total: 54,601
  - Density: 74/km^{2} (190/sq mi)

Changgang County is a kun, or county, in north-central Chagang province, North Korea. Originally part of Kanggye, it was made a separate county in 1949. It borders Hwapyong and Rangrim to the east, Kanggye and Sijung to the west, Songgan to the south, and Chasong to the north.

The terrain of Changgang is rugged and mountainous, with the Kangnam Mountains in the northeast and the Chogyuryong Mountains in the southwest. The highest peak is Kumpasan (금파산, 1918 m) along the northern border.

== History ==
=== Early history ===
No artefacts from the Paleolithic or Neolithic periods have been found, but human existence during these periods is suspected based on discoveries from the neighboring Chasong County. Human existence during the Bronze Age is attested from the pottery from the Mumun pottery period. Black pottery, stone axes Bronze daggers, and crescent stone knives found in Gongwidong and Pungryongdong (the dongs that existed when it was still part of greater Kanggye county. Modern day. Kanggye City and Sijung County). In the early Iron Age, knife money from the Ancient Chinese state of Yan was found in Nonamdong (Dong which was part of Kanggye county, modern day Ronam-ri, Sijung County.)

=== Birth of Changgang County to current day ===
Changgang county was born from the merger of Changjin county and Kanggye county in 1949.In 1952, Dong mun myeon of Changgang county became part of the newly created Rangrim County, Gokhamyeon and Oroimyeon became part of the newly created Sijung County, and part of Gongbuk myeon became part was divided between the administration of Kanggye city and Songgan County.

== Administrative divisions ==
Changgang county is divided into 1 ŭp (town), 3 rodongjagu (workers' districts) and 10 ri (villages):

=== County seat (ŭp) ===
MR Name	RR Name	Hangul
Changgang-ŭp	Changgang-eup	장강읍

=== Workers' districts (rodongjagu) ===
MR Name	RR Name	Hangul
O'il-lodongjagu	Oil-rodongjagu	오일로동자구
Rangrim-rodongjagu	Rangnim-rodongjagu	랑림로동자구
Sŭngbang-rodongjagu	Seungbang-rodongjagu	승방로동자구

=== Villages (ri) ===
MR Name	RR Name	Hangul
Changhang-ri	Changhang-ri	장항리
Changp'yŏng-ri	Changpyeong-ri	창평리
Chongp'o-ri	Jongpo-ri	종포리
Hyangha-ri	Hyangha-ri	향하리
Hyŏksil-li	Hyeoksil-ri	혁실리
Mudŏng-ri	Mudeong-ri	무등리
Myŏngsil-li	Myeongsil-ri	명실리
Sinsŏng-ri	Sinseong-ri	신성리
Sŏngjang-ri	Seongjang-ri	성장리
Wŏnp'yŏng-ri	Wonpyeong-ri	원평리

== Economy ==
There are soft-drink, clothing and pharmaceutical factories in the county. Rice is grown along the Chongsong River (종성강); various other agricultural produce are grown in the large areas of land which Kim Il Sung suggested be cleared in a 1974 letter. 75% of the county is for agricultural purposes, most of which are fields. Animals are raised in the county, utilising mountains and fields for grazing. Logging takes place in the county, with production and processing of the wood taking place in the county.

The largest industry in the county is hydroelectricity generation, followed by mining. Zinc, graphite, fluorite and lead is mined. The county has a number of small to medium-sized hydropower stations, fed by larger hydropower stations such as the Kanggye Youth Power Plant.

== Transport ==
Changgang is served by road and rail, with the Kanggye Line passing through the southeast.

Roads from Kanggye and Hyesan, Kanggye and Rangrim, Changgang and Manpo, Kanggye and Taehung, Changgang and Wonpyong run through the county.

== See also ==
- Geography of North Korea
- Administrative divisions of North Korea
- Chagang
