= Sangpunggang station =

Railway station in North Korea

Sangp'unggang 상풍강

Korean name
- Hangul: 상풍강역
- Hanja: 上豊江驛
- Revised Romanization: Sangpunggang-yeok
- McCune–Reischauer: Sangp'unggang-yŏk

General information
- Location: Unbong-rodongjagu, Chasŏng-gun, Chagang Province; North Korea
- Owner: Korean State Railway
- Lines: Pukbunaeryuk Line, Unbong Line

History
- Opened: 27 November 1987

Services
Preceding station	Korean State Railway	Following station
Songsam towards Manp'o Ch'ŏngnyŏn	Pukbunaeryuk Line	Unbong towards Hyesan Ch'ŏngnyŏn
Terminus	Unbong Line	Kuunbong Terminus
Location

Sangp'unggang station is a railway station in Unbong-rodongjagu, Chasŏng County, Chagang Province, North Korea, on the Pukbunaeryuk Line of the Korean State Railway; it is also the starting point of the Unbong Line.

== History ==
Although the Unbong Line was opened in 1959, the halt at Sangp'unggang was opened only on 27 November 1987 when construction of the first western section (Sangp'unggang–Chasŏng) of the Pukbunaeryuk Line was completed; as far as this point, the Unbong Line was absorbed into the new Pukpu Line, and Sangp'unggang became the junction point of the Pukpu Line and the truncated remainder of the Unbong Line.
