= Obongsan (Chagang) =

Mountain in North Korea

Highest point
- Elevation: 1,180 m (3,870 ft)

Geography
- Location: Chagang, North Korea

Obongsan is a mountain of North Korea. It has an elevation of 1,180 metres It stands between Changgang County and Hwapyong County in Chagang Province.

== See also ==
- List of mountains of Korea
