= Rangrim County =

Rangrim County 랑림군
- County

Korean transcription(s)
  - Hanja: 狼林郡
  - McCune-Reischauer: Rangrim-gun
  - Revised Romanization: Rangrim-gun
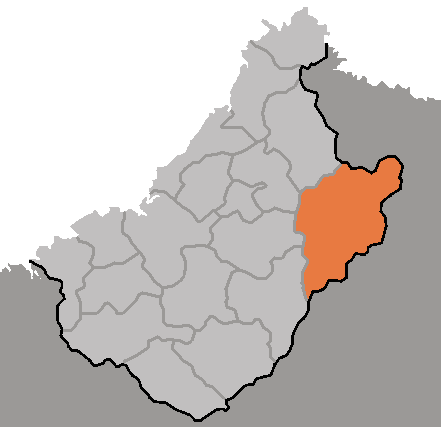
- Map of Chagang showing the location of Rangrim
- Country: North Korea
- Province: Chagang Province
- Administrative divisions: 1 ŭp, 2 workers' districts, 14 ri

Area
  - Total: 2,058 km^{2} (795 sq mi)

Population (2008)
  - Total: 36,481
  - Density: 17.73/km^{2} (45.91/sq mi)

Rangrim County (Chosŏn'gŭl: 랑림군, literally Wolf Forest County) is a kun, or county, on the eastern flank of Chagang province, North Korea. It was created in 1952 from portions of Changgang and Changjin, as part of a general reorganization of local government. Originally part of South Hamgyong, it was transferred to Chagang province in 1954. It borders Hwapyong and Ryanggang's Kimjongsuk and Kimhyongjik counties to the north, South Hamgyong's Pujon county to the east and Changjin to the south, as well as the counties of Changgang, Songgan, and Ryongnim to the west.

The terrain is rugged and mountainous, with the Rangrim Mountains and Yonhwa Mountains passing through the county. The highest point is Yonhwasan, 2355 meters above sea level. The low-lying regions of the county are approximately 1000 meters above sea level. The climate is cold and continental, with frosts descending in mid-September and not relenting until late May.

Several roads pass through the county; in addition, the Kanggye Line railroad connects Rangnim to Kanggye in the west. The chief local crop is potatoes; maize, barley, and wheat are also raised. There are two major logging camps in the county, along with various factories.

The Rangrim Revolutionary Battle Site is associated with feats of Kim Il Sung during the anti-Japanese struggle.

== Administrative divisions ==
Rangrim County is divided into 1 ŭp (town), 2 rodongjagu (workers' districts) and 14 ri (villages):

- Rangrim-ŭp
- Samp'o-rodongjagu
- Sinwŏl-lodongjagu
- Changsŏng-ri
- Sŏjung-ri
- Sŏsang-ri
- Hwangp'o-ri
- Munang-ri
- Chunghŭng-ri
- Unso-ri
- Ryŏnhwa-ri
- Chunggang-ri
- Taehŭng-ri
- Kaljŏm-ri
- Insal-li
- Sinjŏl-li
- Ryubŏl-li

== See also ==
- Geography of North Korea
- Administrative divisions of North Korea
- Chagang
