= Kujung station =

Railway station in North Korea

Kujung 구중

Korean name
- Hangul: 구중역
- Hanja: 舊中驛
- Revised Romanization: Gujung-yeok
- McCune–Reischauer: Kujung-yŏk

General information
- Location: Kujungyŏng-ri, Chasŏng-gun, Chagang Province; North Korea
- Coordinates: 41.3843°N 126.6000°E
- Owner: Korean State Railway
- Line: Pukbunaeryuk Line

History
- Opened: 27 November 1987

Services
Preceding station	Korean State Railway	Following station
Unbong towards Manp'o Ch'ŏngnyŏn	Pukbunaeryuk Line	Chasŏng towards Hyesan Ch'ŏngnyŏn
Location

Kujung station is a railway station in Kujungyŏng-ri, Chasŏng County, Chagang Province, North Korea, on the Pukbunaeryuk Line of the Korean State Railway.

== History ==
The station was opened on 27 November 1987 by the Korean State Railway, along with the rest of the first western section of the Pukpu Line between Unbong (Sinunbong) and Chasŏng.
