= Unbong station =

Railway station in Chasong County, North Korea

Unbong 운봉

Korean name
- Hangul: 운봉
- Hanja: 雲峰驛
- Revised Romanization: Unbong-yeok
- McCune–Reischauer: Unbong-yŏk

General information
- Location: Unbong-rodongjagu, Chasŏng-gun, Chagang Province; North Korea
- Coordinates: 41.3593°N 126.5418°E
- Owner: Korean State Railway
- Line: Pukbunaeryuk Line

History
- Opened: 27 November 1987
- Former names: Sinunbong (신운봉, 新雲峰)

Services
| Preceding station | Korean State Railway | Following station |
|---|---|---|
| Sangp'unggang towards Manp'o Ch'ŏngnyŏn | Pukbunaeryuk Line | Kujung towards Hyesan Ch'ŏngnyŏn |
Location

Unbong station is a railway station in Unbong-rodongjagu, Chasŏng County, Chagang Province, North Korea, on the Pukbunaeryuk Line of the Korean State Railway.

== History ==
Originally called Sinunbong station to differentiate it from the existing terminus of the Unbong Line, then called Unbong station, this station was opened on 27 November 1987 by the Korean State Railway, along with the rest of the first western section of the new Pukpu Line between Sinunbong and Chasŏng. With the opening of the new station, the old station was converted into a freight-only station as the terminus of the truncated Unbong Line, whilst the new station handled all passenger traffic for the town of Unbong. At some point in time the stations traded names, with Sinunbong station ("new Unbong station") becoming the current Unbong station, and the original Unbong station becoming today's Kuunbong station ("old Unbong station") – this might have happened either between 1991 and 1993, when electrification works of the Pukpu Line were completed, or between 2011 and 2013 when, in accordance with Kim Jong Il's order to refurbish the by then nearly decrepit Pukpu Line, work brigades of the Kim Il-sung Socialist Youth League rebuilt the entirety of the Manp'o–Hyesan line between April 2011 and November 2013; at that time, many other stations along the line were renamed, most to honour the youth work brigades in keeping with what had become a North Korean tradition since 1958, when Kim Il Sung gave the Sariwŏn–Haeju line – rebuilt by youth "volunteer" teams – the name of "Hwanghae Ch'ŏngnyŏn Line" ("Yellow Sea Youth").
