= Wiwon County =

Wiwon County 위원군
- County

Korean transcription(s)
  - Hanja: 渭原郡
  - McCune-Reischauer: Wiwŏn kun
  - Revised Romanization: Wiwon-gun
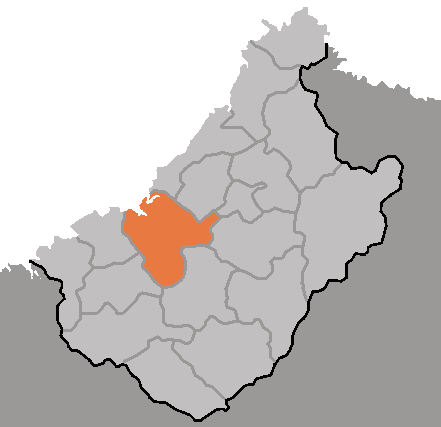
- Map of Chagang showing the location of Wiwon
- Country: North Korea
- Province: Chagang Province
- Administrative divisions: 1 ŭp, 2 workers' districts, 20 ri

Area
  - Total: 1,171 km^{2} (452 sq mi)

Population (2008)
  - Total: 60,245
  - Density: 51.45/km^{2} (133.2/sq mi)

Wiwŏn County is a kun, or county, in northern Chagang province, North Korea. It stands across the Yalu River from the People's Republic of China. It was originally part of North P'yŏngan province, but was annexed to Chagang in 1954. It borders Manp'o and Sijungto the north, Kanggye and Songgan to the east, Ch'onch'ŏn to the southeast, Kop'ung to the south and west, and Ch'osan to the west.

The main line of the Kangnam Mountains passes along the southeast border. The highest point is Sunjŏksan (숭적산, 1984 m). High mountains also rise along the border with Kop'ung and Ch'osan. The climate is continental, with cold winters and an average annual temperature of 6 °C.

The chief local industries are logging and agriculture. There is little valley land, so rice is not grown; however, orchards are cultivated and livestock raised. In addition, dry-field crops include soybeans, maize, and potatoes. In September 2005, North Korea announced the completion of a second power station in Wiwon to supply electric power to the forestry camps.

== Administrative divisions ==
Wiwŏn County is divided into 1 ŭp (town), 2 rodongjagu (workers' districts) and 20 ri (villages):

- Wiwŏn-ŭp
- Ryanggang-rodongjagu
- Ryongyŏl-lodongjagu
- Chisal-li
- Ch'angp'yŏng-ri
- Ch'ukp'o-ri
- Hwach'ang-ri
- Hyangyang-ri
- Kaewŏl-li
- Kobo-ri
- Kosŏng-ri
- Kuam-ri
- Kwangch'ŏl-li
- Ŏgong-ri
- Puhŭng-ri
- Rangmil-li
- Ryongtal-li
- Samgang-ri
- Sinyŏl-li
- Songjil-li
- Taeya-ri
- Tobong-ri
- Tŏk'am-ri

== See also ==
- Geography of North Korea
- Administrative divisions of North Korea
- Chagang
