= Ryongrim County =

Ryongrim County 룡림군
- County

Korean transcription(s)
  - Hanja: 龍林郡
  - Hangul: South Korean: 용림군
  - McCune-Reischauer: Ryongrim kun
  - Revised Romanization: South Korean: Yongnim-gun
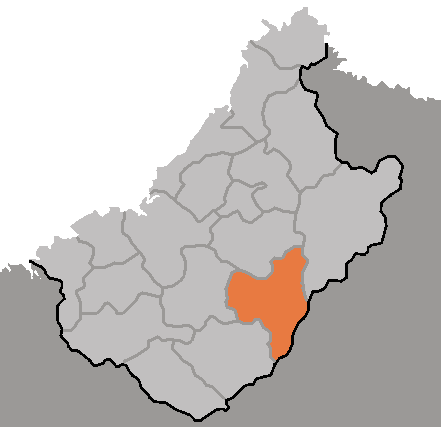
- Map of Chagang showing the location of Ryongrim
- Country: North Korea
- Province: Chagang Province
- Administrative divisions: 1 ŭp, 12 ri

Area
  - Total: 1,203 km^{2} (464 sq mi)

Population (2008)
  - Total: 32,727
  - Density: 27.20/km^{2} (70.46/sq mi)

Ryongrim County is a kun, or county, in southeastern Chagang Province, North Korea. It borders Rangrim, Changjin, Chŏnch'ŏn, Tongsin, Taehŭng, and Sŏnggan counties. The county is mainly alpine territory. It contains many mountain peaks, such as Wagalbong (2,260m), Ch'ŏnŭimulsan (2,032m), Rangrimsan (2,186m), Milpuldŏksan (1,577m), Ungŏsusan (2,020m), Tomabong (1,525m), Paktalsan (1,817m), Taedasan (1,463m), and Sonamsan (1,178m).

In the standard dialect of South Korea, Ryongrim loses its initial 'r' both in pronunciation and spelling.

== Administrative divisions ==
Ryongrim County is divided into 1 ŭp (town) and 12 ri (villages):

- Ryongrim-ŭp
- Ch'ŏnsal-li
- Huji-ri
- Kuryong-ri
- Kwangsŏng-ri
- Namhŭng-ri
- Namsang-ri
- Ryongmul-li
- Ryongsang-ri
- Sinch'ang-ri
- Sinhŭng-ri
- Toyang-ri
- Tumul-li

== See also ==
- Geography of North Korea
- Administrative divisions of North Korea
