= Kwansŏ =

Historical region now in North Korea

- Region of Korea
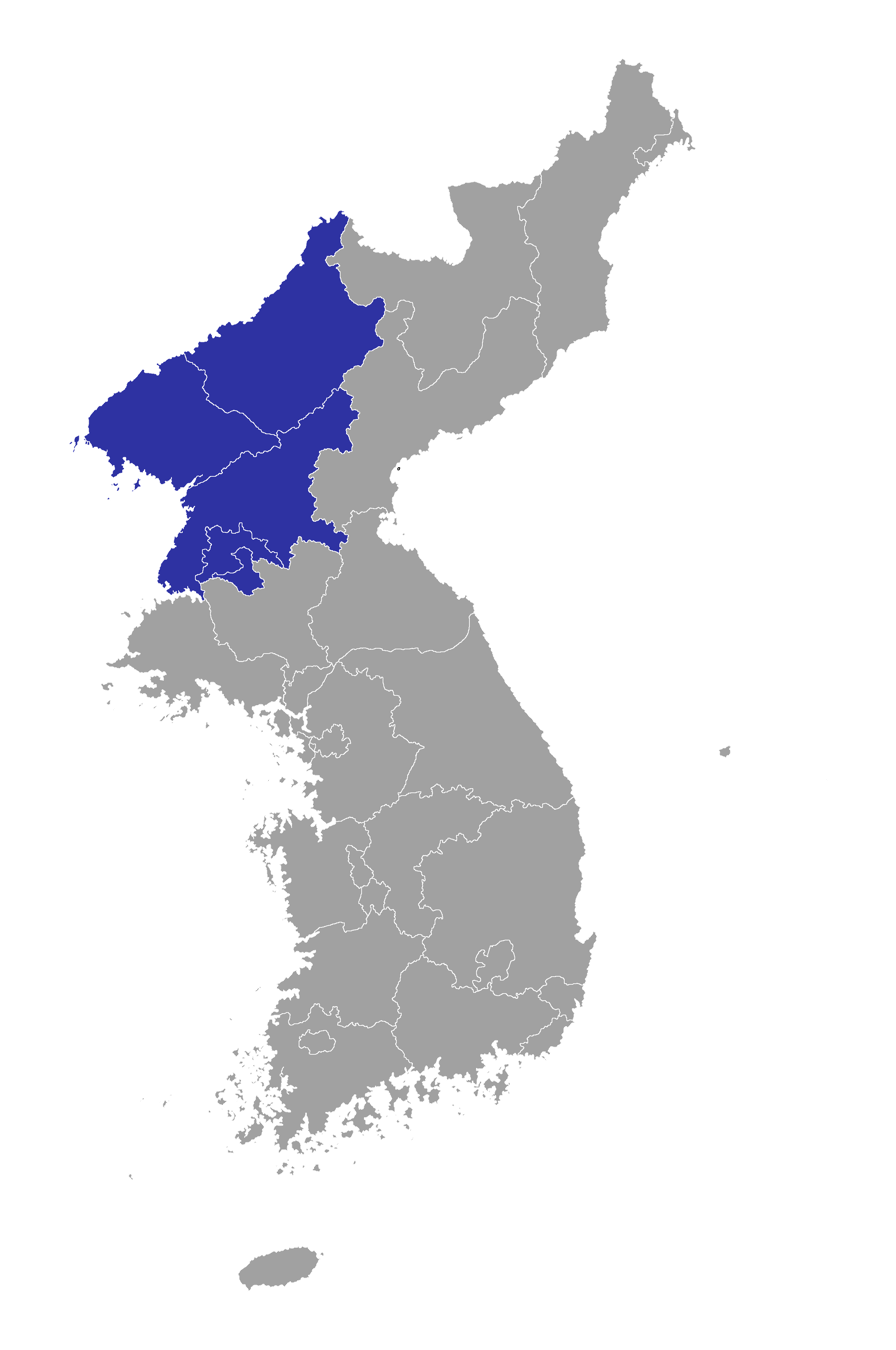
- Kwansŏ region (blue) in northeast Korea
- Country: North Korea; South Korea (claimed)

Korean name
- Hangul: 관서
- Hanja: 關西
- RR: Gwanseo
- MR: Kwansŏ

Kwansŏ (Korean: 관서), or Gwanseo, is a region of Korea. It lies in the northwest of the Korean Peninsula, occupied by the North Korean provinces of North Pyongan, South Pyongan, and Chagang, as well as the cities of Pyongyang and Nampo.

== Name ==
The name has a number of possible origins. It possibly comes from the name of a region called Kwannedo (관내도; 關內道), which was west (서; 西; sŏ) of the Seoul capital area and developed during the Goryeo period. Another possible origin is because it was west of a Goryeo-era gateway called Ch'ŏllyŏnggwan (철령관); one writer for the Encyclopedia of Korean Culture argued the latter theory was more plausible given the region's distance from the Seoul region.

== History ==
=== Kojosŏn ===
Northeast Korea has historically been the homeland of Proto-Koreanic and Tungusic peoples. According to the founding legend, Tangun founded the kingdom of Kojosŏn in 2333 BCE. It was inhabited by the Yemaek, a Proto-Koreanic ethnic group hailing from southern Manchuria. Kojoson at its height held much of the northern half of the Korean Peninsula, and its capital was Wanggŏmsŏng (present-day Pyongyang, North Korea).

=== Chosŏn ===
Under the Chosŏn Dynasty, the modern provinces of Korea were organized. In 1413, Pyŏngan Province was established. The historical Eight Provinces of Korea, except for Kyŏnggi, were named by taking the first syllable from the province's two principal cities. In this case, Pyong’an was named by taking the first syllable from its two principal cities: Pyongyang and Anju.

Koreans from the northern regions, particularly Pyong’an and Hamgyŏng, were severely discriminated against. The region frequently fell victim to drought, famine, and disease.

In 1895, King Gojong implemented the 23 Districts System, which divided Pyongan into Ganggyebu (강계부, centered around present-day Kanggye), Uijubu (의주부, centered around present-day Sinuiju and Uiju-gun), and Pyeongyangbu (평양부, centered around present-day Pyongyang). In 1896, just one year later, the districts were reorganized into northern and southern provinces. Uiju and Ganggye districts were reorganized into North Pyongan Province, while Pyongyang district was reorganized into South Pyong’an Province.

=== Contemporary history ===
Following the end of World War II, Korea was divided at the 38th parallel, with Korea north of the parallel being occupied by the Soviet Union from 1945 to the founding of the Democratic People's Republic of Korea in 1948. In 1949, Chagang Province was founded by land demarcated mostly from North Pyongyang, and partly from a far-west portion of South Hamgyong that later became Ryanggang Province in 1954.

== Administrative divisions ==
The Kwansŏ region hosts three provinces (도, do), one "directly governed city" (직할시, chikhalsi), and one "special city" (특별시, tŭkpyŏlsi), according to the North Korean government. However, the South Korean government does not recognize any changes made by the DPRK to its internal borders, and according to the administrative divisions of South Korea, the Kwansŏ region only hosts two provinces: North Pyeongan and South Pyeongan.

Provinces (道/도)
Province	Hancha	Chosŏn'gŭl	RR	McCune-Reischauer	Abbreviation	Capital
North Pyongan	平安北道	풩안북도	Pyeonganbuk-do	Pyŏnganbuk-do	Pyŏngbuk (平北/평북)	Sinŭiju
South Pyongan	平安南道	평안남도	Pyeongannam-do	Pyŏngannam-do	Pyŏngnam (平南/평남)	Pyŏngsŏng
Chagang	慈江道	자강도	Jagang-do	Chagang-do	N/A	Kanggye

Provinces according to the Committee for the Five Northern Korean Provinces
Map	Province	Capital	Governor
	North Pyeongan	Sinuiju	Yang Jong-gwang
	South Pyeongan	Pyeongyang	Cho Myeong-cheol

== Culture ==
The northern regions of Korea have many cultural differences from the rest of Korea. North Korea as a whole still holds traditional Korean culture and values in high esteem, while South Korea, due to its open borders and global popularity, is undergoing globalization.

People in the Kwansŏ region speak the Northwest Dialect (서북 방언, Sŏbuk-pang'ŏn).

== See also ==
- Regions of Korea
- Geography of Korea
- Geography of North Korea
