= Chasong station =

Railway station in Chasong County, North Korea

Chasŏng 자성

Korean name
- Hangul: 자성역
- Hanja: 慈城驛
- Revised Romanization: Jaseong-yeok
- McCune–Reischauer: Chasŏng-yŏk

General information
- Location: Chasŏng-ŭp, Chasŏng-gun, Chagang Province; North Korea
- Coordinates: 41.4482°N 126.6412°E
- Owner: Korean State Railway
- Line: Pukbunaeryuk Line

History
- Opened: 27 November 1987

Services
Preceding station	Korean State Railway	Following station
Kujung towards Manp'o Ch'ŏngnyŏn	Pukbunaeryuk Line	Sahyang towards Hyesan Ch'ŏngnyŏn
Location

Chasŏng station is a railway station in Chasŏng-ŭp, Chasŏng County, Chagang Province, North Korea, on the Pukbunaeryuk Line of the Korean State Railway.

== History ==
The station was opened on 27 November 1987 by the Korean State Railway, along with the rest of the first western section of the Pukpu Line between Unbong (Sinunbong) and Chasŏng.
