= Jonchon mine =

Coal mine in North Korea

- Location within North Korea
- Location: Jonchon, Chagang Province, North Korea; 40.598°N 126.5115°E
- Products: Coal

The Jonchon mine(전천탄광) is a coal mine in North Korea. The mine is located in Jonchon county in Chagang Province.
