= Sinyang =

Sinyang may refer to:

- Sinyang County, a county of South Pyongan Province in North Korea
- Xinyang or Sinyang, a city of Henan Province in China
- Sinyang-myeon, a township of Yesan County in South Chungcheong Province, South Korea and birthplace of Pak Hon-yong
