= Kaema Plateau =

Highland in North Korea

- Location within North Korea

Geography
- Range coordinates: 41°N 128°E

- Kaema Plateau
- Hangul: 개마고원
- Hanja: 蓋馬高原
- RR: Gaemagowon
- MR: Kaemagowŏn

The Kaema Plateau is a highland in North Korea. It is surrounded by the Rangrim Mountains, the Macheollyeong Mountains and the Bujeollyeong Mountains. Elevation varies between 700 and 2,000 meters and is approximately 40,000 square kilometers. The Kaema Plateau slopes downward towards the northern border of the People's Republic of China and is the largest tableland in Korea; it is often called "The roof of Korea". In North Korea, the Kaema Plateau is divided into Kaema Plateau, Jagang Plateau, and Baekmu Plateau (in Musan). Up to approximately one million years ago, the Kaema Plateau was an extension of the Manchurian plains, as such the Hochon River and Changjin River were tributaries of the Songhua River, however basalt from Baekdu Mountain accumulated in Changbai Korean Autonomous County, directing the rivers into the Amnok River in modern times, consequently valleys were formed by the tributaries in the ensuing millennia. Some flat terrain still remains in some part in southeastern part of the plateau.

== Geography and geology ==
=== Climate ===
It is one of the coldest areas of Korean Peninsula with elevation reaching as high as 1500m above sea level. During the winter months, the temperature can reach as low as −40 °C, with an average temperature around -17 °C.

== Flora and fauna ==
The climate and terrain are ill-suited for human habitation, consequently the ecosystem and wildlife are relatively untouched in the Kaema Plateau. The area is a known habitat for many rare and endangered animals like Siberian tigers, Amur leopards, Siberian lynx, wolves, bears, Ussuri dholes, Yellow-throated marten. Wild boar and deer subspecies are in the forests. Many wild birds such as black grouse, owls, and woodpeckers are known to inhabit the area.
