= Lake Rangrim =

- Lake Nangnim
- Location within North Korea
- Location: Chagang Province, North Korea
- Coordinates: 40°50′00″N 127°10′00″E
- Type: artificial lake

Lake Rangrim, also known as Lake Nangnim, is an artificial lake in the Rangrim Mountains of Chagang Province in northern North Korea. It was formed by damming a river valley to produce hydroelectricity. The lake, with its adjacent temperate broadleaf and mixed forest habitats, has been identified by BirdLife International as an 8,600 hectares (21,000 acres) Important Bird Area (IBA). The IBA lies at an altitude of 700–1,700 metres (2,300–5,600 ft) above sea level.
