= Unbong Dam =

Dam on the Chinese-North Korean Border

Unbong Dam/Yunfeng Dam
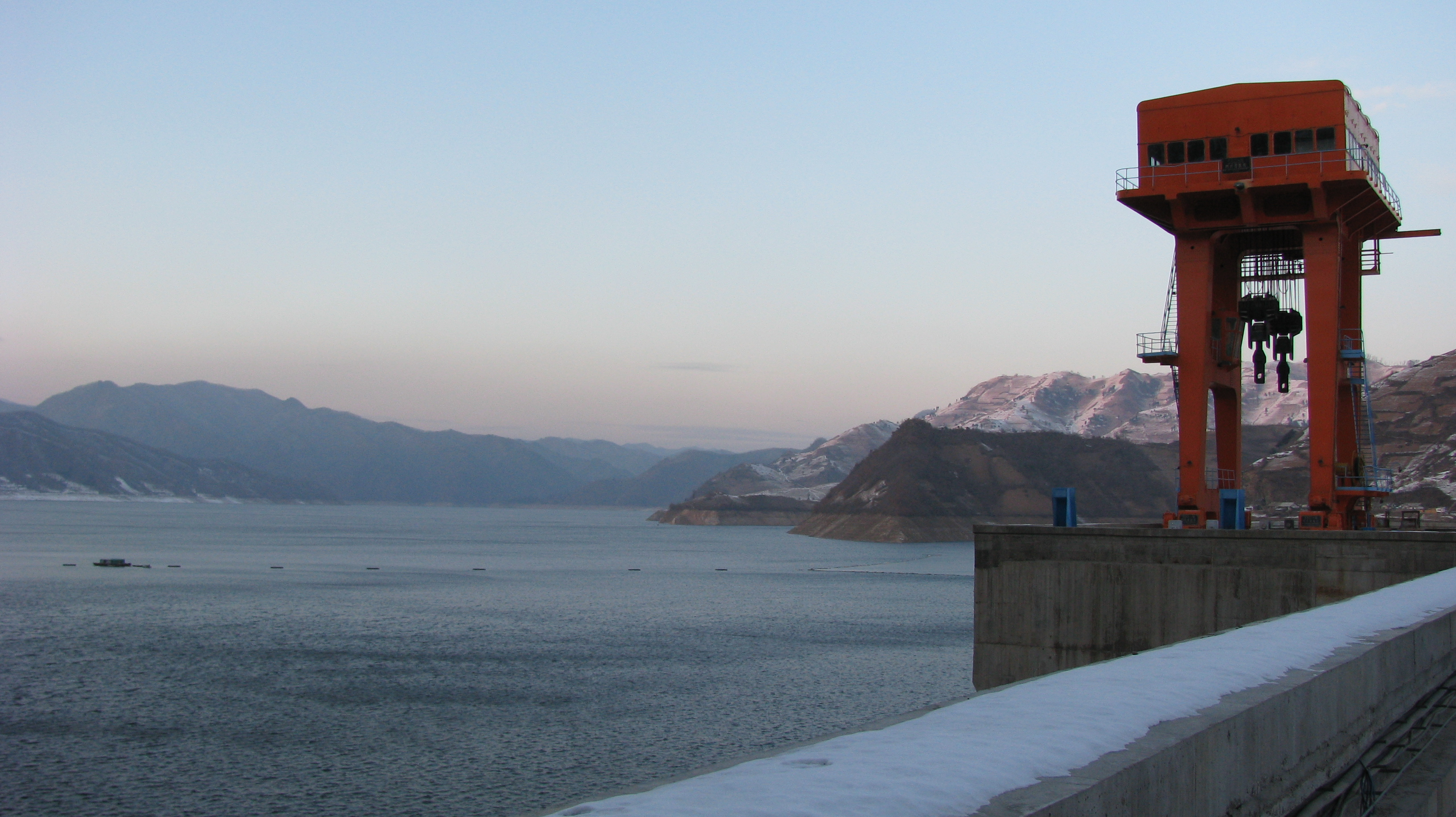
- View of the reservoir from the Chinese-side of the dam

- Location within China
- Official name: 운봉댐,운봉수력발전소,云峰水电站
- Country: China/North Korea
- Location: Ji'an/Chasŏng
- Coordinates: 41°22′51″N 126°30′52″E
- Status: Operational
- Construction began: 1959
- Opening date: 1965

Dam and spillways
- Type of dam: Concrete gravity
- Impounds: Yalu River
- Height: 113.75 m (373 ft)
- Length: 828 m (2,717 ft)
- Elevation at crest: 321.75 m (1,056 ft)
- Spillway type: Overflow, 21 gates
- Spillway capacity: 21,900 m^{3}/s (773,391 cu ft/s)

Reservoir
- Total capacity: 3,895,000,000 m^{3} (3,157,728 acre⋅ft)
- Active capacity: 2,662,000,000 m^{3} (2,158,119 acre⋅ft)
- Catchment area: 17,572 km^{2} (6,785 sq mi)
- Normal elevation: 318.75 m (1,046 ft)

Power Station
- Commission date: 1965-67
- Hydraulic head: 89 m (292 ft) (design)
- Turbines: 4 x 100 MW Francis-type
- Installed capacity: 400 MW

The Unbong Dam, or Yunfeng Dam, is a concrete gravity dam on the Yalu River which borders China and North Korea. It is located 33 km (21 mi) northeast of Ji'an in Jilin Province, China and Chasŏng in Chagang Province, North Korea. The primary purpose of the dam is hydroelectric power generation and it supports a 400 MW power station. Construction of the dam had initially began in August 1942 but was halted in 1945 after the surrender of Japan ending World War II. In October 1959, construction on the dam recommenced and in September 1965, the first of the four 100 MW Francis turbine-generators was operational. The last generator was operational on 4 April 1967. The 113.75 m (373 ft) tall dam creates a reservoir with a storage capacity of 3,895,000,000 m^{3} (3,157,728 acre⋅ft). The dam's spillway is an overflow type with 21 floodgates and has a maximum discharge of 21,900 m^{3}/s (773,391 cu ft/s). The dam is located before a bend in the river and its power station is located on the other side of a ridge that meets the dam's right abutment. Water is delivered to the power station via two tunnels, 775 m (2,543 ft) and 759 m (2,490 ft) long. Generators 1 and 3 deliver power to China while 2 and 4 deliver to North Korea.

== See also ==
- List of dams and reservoirs in China
- List of major power stations in Jilin
