= Chonchon County =

Coordinates: 40°36′56″N 126°27′47″E

Chonchon County 전천군
- County
- Jonchon County

Korean transcription(s)
  - Hanja: 前川郡
  - McCune-Reischauer: Chŏnch'ŏn kun
  - Revised Romanization: Jeoncheon-gun
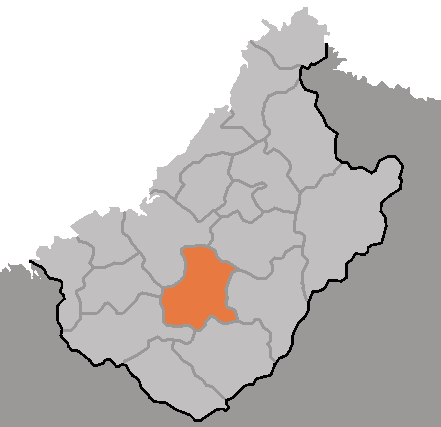
- Map of Chagang showing the location of Chonchon
- Country: North Korea
- Province: Chagang Province
- Administrative divisions: 1 ŭp, 5 workers' districts, 11 ri

Government
  - Jonchon County Peoples' Committee: Shim Dok-young

Area
  - Total: 1,001.16 km^{2} (386.55 sq mi)

Population (2008)
  - Total: 106,311
  - Density: 106.188/km^{2} (275.025/sq mi)

Chŏnch'ŏn (Korean: 전천군; MR: Chŏnch'ŏn-kun) is a kun, or county, in central Chagang province, North Korea. Originally part of Kanggye county, it was made a separate county in 1949.

North Korea's largest fir tree is located in this county.

== Administrative divisions ==
Chŏnch'ŏn County is divided into 1 ŭp (town), 5 rodongjagu (workers' districts) and 11 ri (villages):

=== County seat (ŭp) ===
| MR Name | RR Name | Hangul |
|---|---|---|
| Chŏnch'ŏn-ŭp | Jeoncheon-eup | 전천읍 |

=== Workers' districts (rodongjagu) ===
| MR Name | RR Name | Hangul |
|---|---|---|
| Hakmu-rodongjagu | Hakmu-rodongjagu | 학무로동자구 |
| Hwaam-rodongjagu | Hwaam-rodongjagu | 화암로동자구 |
| Ku'il-rodongjagu | Gu'il-rodongjagu | 고인로동자구 |
| Sinjŏng-rodongjagu | Sinjeong-rodongjagu | 신적로동자구 |
| Unsong-rodongjagu | Unsong-rodongjagu | 운송로동자구 |

=== Villages (ri) ===
| MR Name | RR Name | Hangul |
|---|---|---|
| Ch'angp'yŏng-ri | Changpyeong-ri | 창평리 |
| Hoedŏk-ri | Hoedeok-ri | 회덕리 |
| Hwaryong-ri | Hwaryong-ri | 화룡리 |
| Mup'yŏng-ri | Mupyeong-ri | 무평리 |
| Rimal-ri | Rimal-ri | 리만리 |
| Ch'angdŏng-ri | Changdeok-ri | 창덕리 |
| Singye-ri | Singye-ri | 신계리 |
| Unp'o-ri | Unpo-ri | 운포리 |
| Waul-ri | Waul-ri | 와운리 |
| Changrim-ri | Changnim-ri | 장림리 |
| Chinp'yŏng-ri | Chinpyeong-ri | 진평리 |

== Environment ==
The terrain is high and mountainous, being located in the centre of the Chagang mountains; the highest point is Sungjoksan, 1984 m above sea level. The Chogyuryong Mountains pass through the eastern part of the county. The eastern part of the county is relatively flatter, being located in the Jangja River valley with other deep valleys on either side of the Hwakyongchon stream. Other waterways flowing through the county are the Hoedok stream, both of which flow into the Jangja river. Two-thirds of the county is occupied by mountains ranging from 400 to 1000 metres high.

The average temperature throughout the year is 5.7°C, -15°C in January and 22.3°C in July with an average precipitation of 1005 mm. Frost occurs from September to the following May, with snow from October to April.

91% of the county is covered by forests, mostly cypress, birch and aspen trees. Various other plants exist in the county, as are a range of animals, such as bears.

== Economy ==
The county has a major forestry, machining, agricultural and mining industry. The machining industry produces drills, supplied to mines throughout the country and construction sites; the forestry and wood processors are mostly made into teaching accessories, construction material and furniture. A nationally important match factory is located in the county as are various daily necessities factories.

The largest industry in the county is the food industry, producing soy sauce, soybean paste, cooking oil, soft drink, meat, candy and processed vegetables. 4.9% of the land in the county is used for farming, with most of it being used for grazing followed by various other plants. Various fruits are grown along the banks of the Jangja river, where most of the land is used for paddy fields and is mostly alluvium.

A large effort to rebuild parts of the county started in 2021, which aim to satisfy the desires of the people. Various homes, from single-storey to multi-storey buildings were constructed in the county and reconstruction of the water supply network in town areas and paving works was carried out.

=== Defense industry ===
On 28 July 2017, a Hwasong-14 was successfully launched near Muphyong-ri. It was the first time a missile was launched at night.

==== TEL manufacturing ====
===== Other factories =====
In the 2012 Day of the Sun parade, six WS51200 were seen at the parade, causing some controversy as the export of transporter erector launcher vehicles to North Korea is banned under UNSC resolutions. To circumvent sanctions, North Korea imported the vehicles as logging trucks to be used under the Ministry of Forestry, and subsequently modified them. The naming and exact purposes of the factories are not confirmed, as various defector accounts differ in location and purpose of the factories, with some factories likely only manufacturing parts with final assembling being done elsewhere, possibly at the February 8 General Machine Factory. Although the No. 11 and No. 81 factories do not appear to assemble the vehicles, both of them are apparently important enough to be guarded by clusters of surface-to-air missiles.

==== February 8 General Machine Factory (Factory No.65) ====
The factory is located near Muphyong-ri, under the control of the Second Economic Committee and has links to the KPA Strategic Force. It is one of the DPRK's largest weapons manufacturers, occupying 12.5 km² and has operated ever since the Japanese rule over Korea in WW2. 38 North estimates that it employs 10000 workers and is believed to be where the TELs were built through the extensive modification of the WS51200, to be used to carry the Hwasong-10, Hwasong-13 and the Hwasong-14. The buildings in which the launchers are built have been modified with a large cupola, which allows the erector to be fully raised. In the late 20th century, the factory modified imported Japanese logging trucks to be mobile erector launchers and MAZ-543 to be transporter erector launchers. While some factory buildings are located above ground and dispersed around the mountains, there is allegedly a large underground facility, where the main production facilities are.

Although the launch was within the factory, the missile would have been moved from a nearby missile base, and then set up on a launch pad. The launch was likely to demonstrate the Strategic Force's operational capability in launching missiles from remote areas, and the night launch further aims to prove their readiness. However, the factory is not a missile base, and is only responsible for converting the vehicles, as it is neither an operating base or a storage facility for missiles.

Apart from erector vehicles, the factory produces daily necessities.

== Culture ==
In 2017, a traffic park was built in the county, with the purpose of teaching children on various road rules and car driving.

There are 60 educational institutions and 220 child care centres in the county. The Jonchon County Peoples' Hospital is also located in the county, along with a number of other treatment centres.

== Transport ==
The Manpo line runs through the county, as do roads between Pyongyang and Kanggye, Hamhung and Kanggye, Jonchon and Wiwon County.

== See also ==
- Geography of North Korea
- Administrative divisions of North Korea
