= Hwapyong County =

Hwapyong County 화평군
- County

Korean transcription(s)
  - Hancha: 和坪郡
  - McCune–Reischauer: Hwap'yŏng-gun
  - Revised Romanization: Hwapyeong-gun
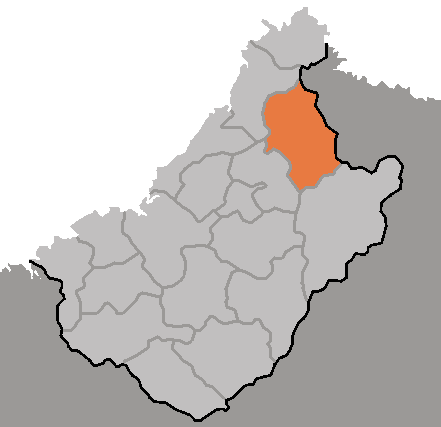
- Map of Chagang showing the location of Hwapyong
- Country: North Korea
- Region: Kwanso
- Province: Chagang
- Administrative divisions: 1 ŭp, 3 rodongjagu, 10 ri

Area
  - Total: 1,219 km^{2} (471 sq mi)

Population (2008)
  - Total: 42,183

Hwapyong County is a kun, or county, in Chagang Province, North Korea. It was incorporated as a new county as part of a general reorganization of local government in December 1952. Previously it had been part of Chasong and Huchang.

== Administrative divisions ==
Hwapyong-gun is divided into one town (ŭp), 3 workers' districts (rodongjagu) and 10 villages (ri).

	Chosŏn'gŭl	Hancha
Hwapyong-ŭp	화평읍	和坪邑
Kasan-rodongjagu	가산로동자구	街山勞動者區
Changbaeng-rodongjagu	장백로동자구	長白勞動者區
Chunghŭng-rodongjagu	중흥로동자구	中興勞動者區
Chinsong-ri	진송리	榛松里
Hoejung-ri	회중리	檜中里
Hŭksu-ri	흑수리	黑水里
Karim-ri	가림리	街林里
Punam-ri	부남리	富南里
Rip'yŏng-ri	리평리	梨坪里
Sobung-ri	소북리	小北里
Songdŏng-ri	송덕리	松德里
Taehŭng-ri	대흥리	大興里
Yanggye-ri	양계리	陽溪里

== See also ==
- Geography of North Korea
- Administrative divisions of North Korea
- Chagang
