= Sinyang County =

Sinyang County 신양군
- County

Korean transcription(s)
  - Chosŏn'gŭl: 신양군
  - Hancha: 新陽郡
  - McCune-Reischauer: Sinyang-gun
  - Revised Romanization: Sinyang-gun
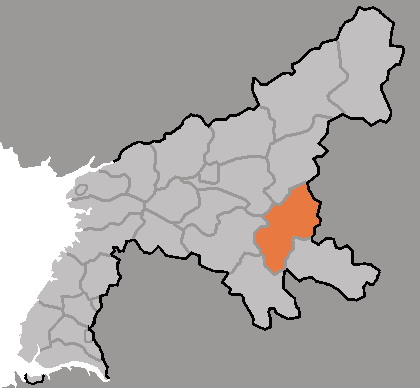
- Map of South Pyongan showing the location of Sinyang
- Country: North Korea
- Province: South P'yŏngan
- Administrative divisions: 1 ŭp, 1 workers' district and 16 ri

Area
  - Total: 737.2 km^{2} (284.6 sq mi)

Population (2008)
  - Total: 59,115
  - Density: 80.19/km^{2} (207.7/sq mi)

Sinyang County is a kun (county) in South P'yŏngan, North Korea.

== Administrative divisions ==
Sinyang County is divided into 1 ŭp (town), 1 rodongjagu (workers' district) and 16 ri (villages):

- Sinyang-ŭp (신양읍/新陽邑)
- Inp'yŏng-rodongjagu (인평로동자구/仁坪勞動者區)
- Changsal-li (장산리/長山里)
- Changsŏng-ri (장성리/長星里)
- Chidong-ri (지동리/支洞里)
- Ch'anggye-ri (창계리/昌溪里)
- Kwanghŭng-ri (광흥리/廣興里)
- Kwansŏng-ri (관성리/冠城里)
- Munmyŏng-ri (문명리/文明里)
- Paeksŏng-ri (백석리/白石里)
- Ryong'ul-li (룡운리/龍雲里)
- Ryongyŏl-li (룡연리/龍淵里)
- Sagae-ri (사개리/寺介里)
- Songdong-ri (송동리/松洞里)
- Songjŏl-li (송전리/松田里)
- Ssangryong-ri (쌍룡리/雙龍里)
- Tŏkhŭng-ri (덕흥리/德興里)
- Unbong-ri (운봉리/雲峰里)

== Transportation ==
Sinyang County is served by the P'yŏngra Line of the Korean State Railway.
