= Rangrim Mountains =

Mountain range in North Korea

Coordinates: 41.3061°N 127.6772°E

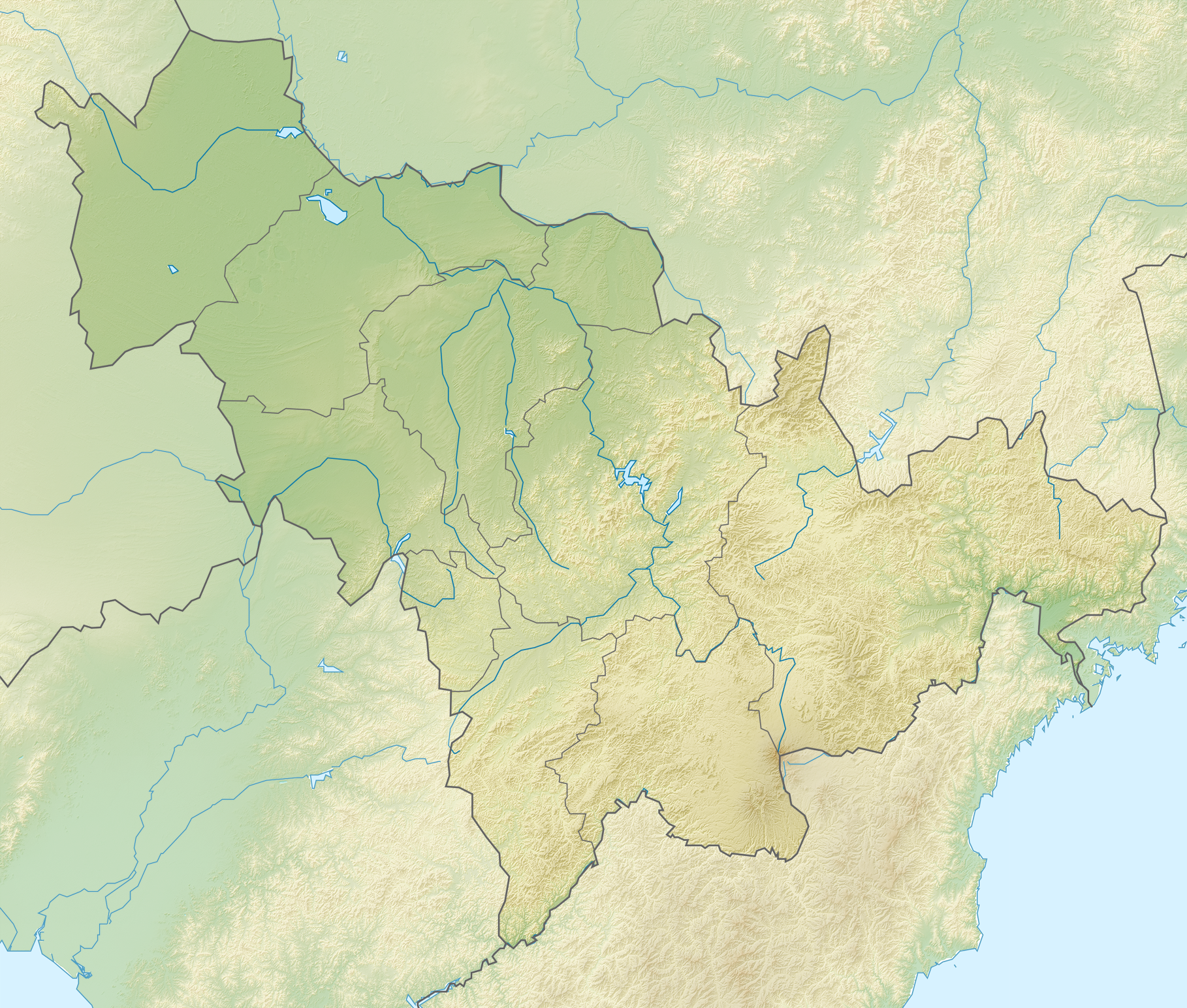
- Location within North Korea Location within Jilin

Highest point
- Peak: Wagalbong
- Elevation: 2,260 m (7,410 ft)

Geography
- Country: North Korea

- Rangrim Mountains
- Hangul: 랑림산맥
- Hanja: 狼林山脈
- RR: Rangnimsanmaek
- MR: Rangnimsanmaek

South Korean name
- Hangul: 낭림산맥
- RR: Nangnimsanmaek
- MR: Nangnimsanmaek

The Rangnim Mountains are a mountain range stretching from north to south, west of the Kaema Highlands, in central northern North Korea. They are the source of several major rivers of North Korea, such as the Taedong and the Ch'ŏngch'ŏn. The mountain range is generally highest in the east, and falls towards the west. Its highest peak is Wagalbong, at 2,260 m. Lake Rangrim is located in the mountains.

== Naming ==
The variants Rangnim and Nangnim are pronunciations of the same name in Northern and Southern dialects of Korean, respectively. These differences are reflected in spelling in the standard forms of Korea used in North Korea and South Korea.
