= Changja River =

River in North Korea

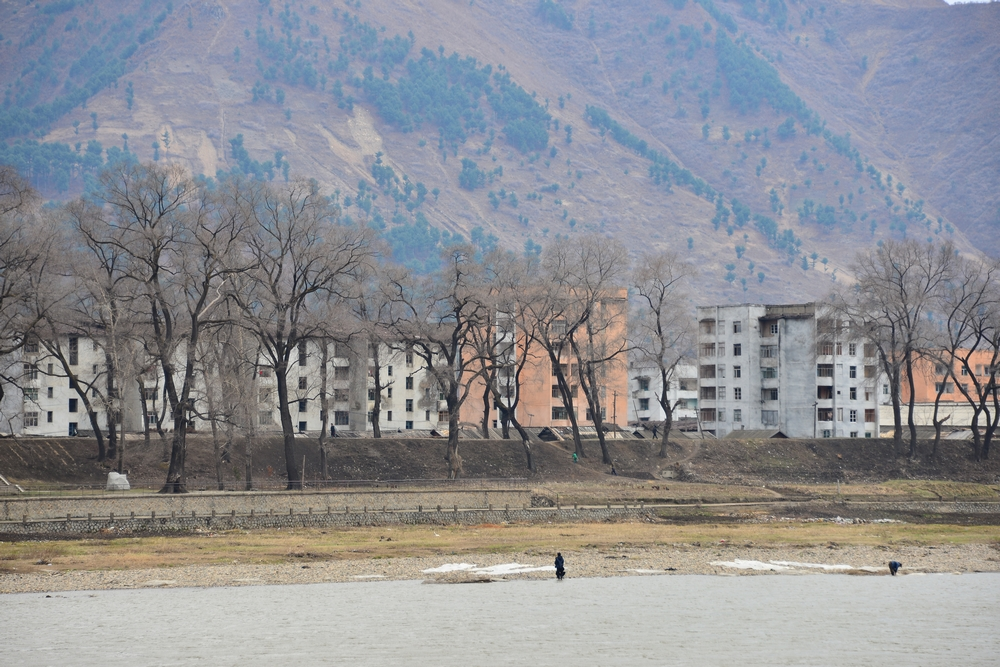

Location
- Location: North Pyongan Province

Physical characteristics
- Source
  - location: Sobaek Mountains
- Mouth
  - location: Yalu River
  - coordinates: 40°57′56″N 126°03′47″E
- Length: 239 km

Basin features
- Progression: Yalu → Yellow Sea
- River system: Yalu

The Changja River (Korean: 장자강) is a river in North Korea. The river originates near Sobaeksan Mountain in the Nanglim Mountains east of Ganggye-gun, North Pyongan Province and flows northwest into the Yalu River.

Until 1976, the river was called Tongno-gang. It is 239 km long, has a catchment area of 207 km^{2}.

The area was the scene of fierce fighting during both the guerrilla war against the Japanese occupation and also during the Korean War. These events were later processed in numerous books and films, for example “On the Banks of Tongro-gang” (독로강 기슭에서 Tongro-gang kisŭlgesŏ) by Kim Hak-yŏn from the Year 1951.

During the first five-year plan (1957–1961), a hydroelectric power station with a capacity of 90 megawatts was built on Tongro-gang. Construction had already begun in 1937, but the systems were dismantled again in 1943.

In the northern interior of the country there is hardly any land that can be used for agriculture. The Tongro-gang valley is the region's most important growing area. Mainly corn is harvested here.
