= Kangnam Mountains =

Mountain range in North Korea

- Location within North Korea

Highest point
- Elevation: 1,046 m (3,432 ft)
- Coordinates: 41°05′06″N 126°30′00″E

Geography
- Location: North Korea

Korean name
- Hangul: 강남산맥
- Hanja: 江南山脈
- RR: Gangnamsanmaek
- MR: Kangnamsanmaek

The Kangnam Mountains (Korean: 강남산맥) are a mountain range of North Korea, in the central part of the country's northern region. They run parallel to the Amnok River which forms the border with China. They lie west of the Rangrim Mountains, which is the drainage divide between northwestern and northeastern Korea.
