= Kanggye =

Kanggye 강계시
- Municipal City

Korean transcription(s)
  - Chosŏn'gŭl: 강계시
  - Hancha: 江界市
  - McCune-Reischauer: Kanggye-si
  - Revised Romanization: Ganggye-si
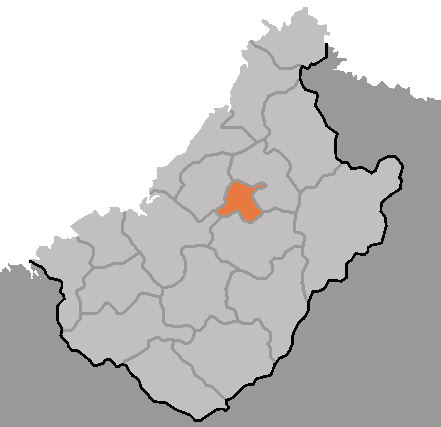
- Map of Chagang showing the location of Kanggye
- Interactive map of Kanggye
- Location within North Korea
- Coordinates: 40°58′N 126°36′E
- Country: North Korea
- Province: Chagang Province
- Administrative divisions: 34 dong, 2 ri

Area
  - Total: 263.667 km^{2} (101.802 sq mi)

Population (2008)
  - Total: 251,971
  - Dialect: P'yŏngan
- Time zone: UTC+9 (Pyongyang Time)

Kanggye (Korean: 강계시; Korean pronunciation: [kɐŋ.ɡje]) is the provincial capital of Chagang, North Korea and has a population of 251,971. Because of its strategic importance, derived from its topography, it has been of military interest from the time of the Joseon Dynasty (1392-1910).

== History ==
In December 1949, Kanggye-myon was promoted to Kanggye-si.

During the Korean War, after being driven from Pyongyang, Kim Il Sung and his government temporarily moved the capital to Kanggye after first moving temporarily to Sinuiju. The city was firebombed in November 1950 on American general Douglas MacArthur's orders after the Chinese People's Volunteer Army turned the course of the war; at least 65% of the city was destroyed. The following month Kim presided over a plenum of the cabinet at Kanggye, where he assigned blame for what he claimed were military failures during the losing phase of the war.

Supreme Leader Kim Jong Il toured facilities at Kanggye and the surrounding area in January 1998 amid the North Korean famine. State media thereafter promoted the "Kanggye spirit" (강계정신), extolling the city's success in building power stations and improving factories despite shortages.

== Culture ==
=== Attractions ===
Kanggye is home to an open-air stadium and is also home to the Kanggye Riding Club, which was built in 2024. Kanggye has scenic walkways along the Changja River and a small waterpark.

Other places of interest include Inphung Pavilion and Mount Ryonhwa. Tourist attractions have been developed to show the mountainous nature of the city.

=== Facilities ===
Kanggye University of Education, Kanggye University of Technology, and the Kanggye University of Medicine are located in the city.

The city has more than 50 various medical centres including an oral care and a maternity hospital.

== Transportation ==
Kanggye is a transportation hub, connected to other cities by road and rail. It lies at the junction of the Kanggye and Manp'o Lines. Commuter trains run on the Manpo line between Kanggye and Ssangbangdong stations. In addition, highways connect it to Pyongyang and other locations, with the road network of Chagang province being centered on the city.

Kanggye has a trolleybus (무궤도전차) system, opened on April 17, 1992, with one 12 km line running from Changja-dong to Kong'in-dong, following the embankment of the Changja and Puchon rivers. Up until 2009 it had 6 full length and 2 medium trolleybuses; in the 2010s 5 full length and 1 medium trolleybus remained. In 2020, the northern loop was built into a small depot.

== Broadcasting ==
A local radio station called "Kanggye Broadcasting (강계방송)", originally founded in 1947 as a local broadcasting station for North Pyongan Province, which later became a local broadcasting station for Chagang Province in 1949. It is operated by the Chagang Province Broadcasting Committee (자강도 방송위원회). It airs programs that cover topics such as ideological education or local weather information.

== Economy ==
From 1945, the manufacturing industry developed rapidly.

Kanggye has a mining industry producing copper, zinc ore, coal and graphite.

Kanggye hosts one of the main timber processing factories of Chagang province and North Korea. The city has various light industry along with production of construction, electrical and precision machinery. The pencils produced, which are also exported, have 'national significance'. The city also has agricultural, fruit, vegetable and livestock production.

=== Electricity production ===
The city has a large number of hydropower plants due to its location near a number of rivers. The first hydropower station in a series of them is called Hungju No.1 Youth Power Station, is located 3.5 km north of Kanggye. It is supported by the Ryongrim dam, which does not have a power station attached to it. This allows a careful management of the water level to ensure efficient operation. This is followed by the Hungju Youth Power Station No. 2 and 3. No.2 was completed in 2007 and No.3 was completed by February 2019, fitted with three generator turbines.

There are also a series of four small scale hydropower plants on the Pukchon river.

=== Kanggye Timber Processing Factory ===
Kanggye Timber Processing Factory(강계목재가공공장) is a small state-run factory located in Kanggye City. At the start of operations, it produced only two kinds of furniture (dining tables and sterilized chopsticks) through manual labour. Over time it has developed into a comprehensive modernized furniture producer, producing woodwork with a hundred and dozens of modern facilities in production.

Amongst machinery in use are three- and four-faced automatic planes, all-purpose polishers, joining machines, and grooving saws.

Meanwhile, the factory has directed an effort into the programme of modernizing the drying job, which is an important part of the woodworking process. By making technical innovations (such as replacing a boiler-induced drying process drying ovens and using fuels other than coal) the factory increased production and lowered manpower.

=== No.26 General Plant ===
The No.26 factory is the largest underground military facility in Korea. The plant manufactures ammunition which has been exported to Libya, Syria, Iran, Iraq and Egypt. It employs more than 20,000 workers and can produce 126,000 mortar rounds and 1.76 million rounds of rifle ammunition per year. On November 30, 1991, up to a thousand people were allegedly killed after a massive explosion at the plant. South Korean sources put the number of fatalities at six times that amount or more based on the claims of survivors of the incident.

== Administrative divisions ==
Kanggye is divided into 34 tong (neighbourhoods) and two ri (villages):

=== Neighborhoods (dong) ===
MR Name	RR Name	Hangul
Changja-dong	Jangja-dong	장자동
Ch'ungsŏng-dong	Chungseong-dong	충성동
Hyangro-dong	Hyangro-dong	향로동
Hŭngju-dong	Heungju-dong	흥주동
Kangsŏ-dong	Gangseo-dong	강서동
Koyŏng 1-dong	Goyeong 1-dong	고영1동
Koyŏng 2-dong	Goyeong 2-dong	고영2동
Konggwi-dong	Gonggwi-dong	공귀동
Kong'in-dong	Gongin-dong	공인동
Mansu-dong	Mansu-dong	만수동
Nammun-dong	Nammun-dong	남문동
Namsan-dong	Namsan-dong	남산동
Ryu-dong	Ryu-dong	류동
Sinmun-dong	Sinmun-dong	신문동
Sŏsan-dong	Seosan-dong	서산동
Sŏkcho-dong	Seokjo-dong	석조동
Sŏkhyŏn-dong	Seokhyeon-dong	석현동
Such'im-dong	Suchim-dong	수침동
Taeŭng-dong	Daeung-dong	대응동
Tŏksan-dong	Doksan-dong	독산동
Tongbu-dong	Dongbu-dong	동부동
Tongmun-dong	Dongmun-dong	동문동
Ŭijin-dong	Uijin-dong	의진동
Ŭnjŏng-dong	Eunjeong-dong	은정동
Oeryong-dong	Oeryong-dong	외룡동
Puch'ang-dong	Buchang-dong	부창동
Pukmun-dong	Bukmun-dong	북문동
Rodongja-dong	Rodongja-dong	로동자동
Yŏnp'ung-dong	Yeonpung-dong	연풍동
Yŏnsŏk-dong	Yeonseok-dong	연석동
Yahak-tong	Yahak-dong	야학동
Yŏnju-dong	Yeonju-dong	연주동
Namch'ŏn-dong	Namcheon-dong	남천동
Naeryong-dong	Naeryong-dong	내룡동

=== Villages (ri) ===
MR Name	RR Name	Hangul
Sinhŭng-ri	Sinheung-ri	신흥리
Tuhŭng-ri	Duheung-ri	두흥리

== Geography ==
Kanggye gets its name, "river junction," from the Changja River, which flows through the city, and two tributaries. The city is located in a basin, and is hence surrounded by mountains. The main mountain ranges are the Nangnim and Gangnam.

=== Climate ===
Kanggye has a humid continental climate (Köppen climate classification: Dwa).

Climate data for Kanggye (1991–2020 normals, extremes 1957-present)
Month	Jan	Feb	Mar	Apr	May	Jun	Jul	Aug	Sep	Oct	Nov	Dec	Year
Record high °C (°F)	6.9 (44.4)	14.7 (58.5)	24.0 (75.2)	30.8 (87.4)	33.9 (93.0)	37.8 (100.0)	38.0 (100.4)	38.9 (102.0)	30.5 (86.9)	28.2 (82.8)	21.2 (70.2)	12.2 (54.0)	38.9 (102.0)
Mean daily maximum °C (°F)	−4.9 (23.2)	0.2 (32.4)	7.5 (45.5)	16.4 (61.5)	23.2 (73.8)	27.5 (81.5)	29.4 (84.9)	28.7 (83.7)	24.1 (75.4)	16.5 (61.7)	5.8 (42.4)	−3.2 (26.2)	14.3 (57.7)
Daily mean °C (°F)	−12.6 (9.3)	−7.4 (18.7)	0.8 (33.4)	9.2 (48.6)	15.9 (60.6)	20.5 (68.9)	23.7 (74.7)	22.8 (73.0)	16.8 (62.2)	8.8 (47.8)	−0.2 (31.6)	−9.5 (14.9)	7.4 (45.3)
Mean daily minimum °C (°F)	−18.4 (−1.1)	−13.8 (7.2)	−4.9 (23.2)	2.7 (36.9)	9.4 (48.9)	15.1 (59.2)	19.4 (66.9)	18.5 (65.3)	11.3 (52.3)	2.9 (37.2)	−4.9 (23.2)	−14.8 (5.4)	1.9 (35.4)
Record low °C (°F)	−32.8 (−27.0)	−28.9 (−20.0)	−23.9 (−11.0)	−12.8 (9.0)	−1.1 (30.0)	5.0 (41.0)	10.6 (51.1)	6.3 (43.3)	−0.8 (30.6)	−9.4 (15.1)	−25.0 (−13.0)	−33.9 (−29.0)	−33.9 (−29.0)
Average precipitation mm (inches)	10.1 (0.40)	11.9 (0.47)	21.1 (0.83)	41.8 (1.65)	74.4 (2.93)	113.3 (4.46)	206.9 (8.15)	168.1 (6.62)	73.0 (2.87)	44.5 (1.75)	31.8 (1.25)	15.6 (0.61)	812.5 (31.99)
Average precipitation days (≥ 0.1 mm)	4.8	4.3	5.8	7.6	10.2	12.6	14.1	12.2	6.9	6.9	7.0	6.5	98.9
Average snowy days	7.8	6.5	6.7	1.7	0.0	0.0	0.0	0.0	0.0	0.6	5.9	9.7	38.9
Average relative humidity (%)	78.3	73.6	68.6	65.3	68.4	74.7	79.2	80.3	77.3	73.8	77.0	78.6	74.6
Source 1: Korea Meteorological Administration
Source 2: NOAA (extremes)

== See also ==
- Geography of North Korea
- List of cities in North Korea
