= Geography of North Korea =

Coordinates: 40°00′N 127°00′E

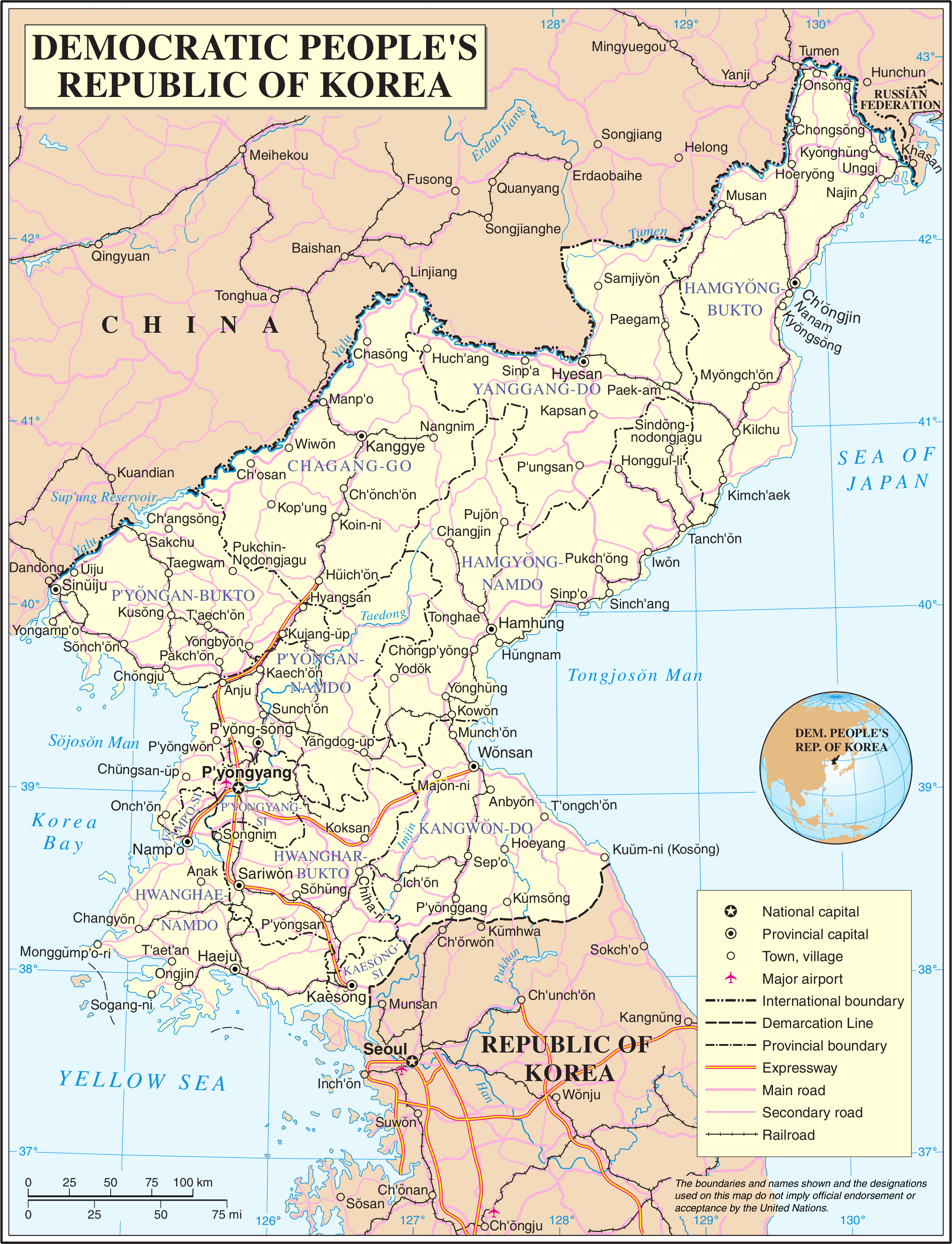
A map of North Korea

North Korea is located in East Asia in the Northern half of Korea, partially on the Korean Peninsula. It borders three countries: China along the Yalu (Amnok) River, Russia along the Tumen River, and South Korea to the south.

== Topography and drainage ==
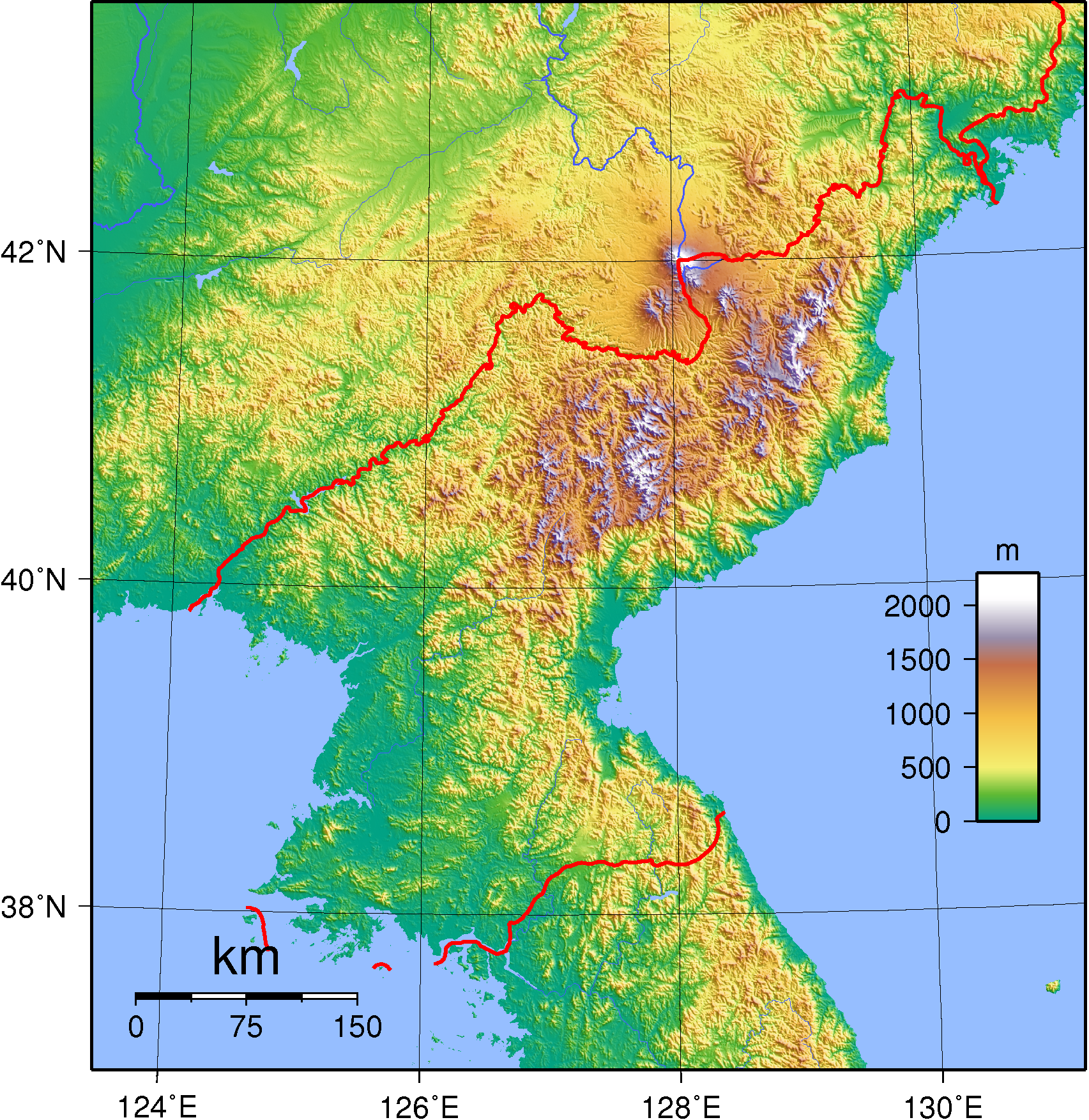
North Korea's topography

The terrain consists mostly of hills and mountains separated by deep, narrow valleys. The coastal plains are wide in the west and discontinuous in the east.

Early European visitors to Korea remarked that the country resembled "a sea in a heavy gale" because of the many successive mountain ranges that crisscross the peninsula. Some 80 percent of North Korea's land area is composed of mountains and uplands, with all of the peninsula's mountains with elevations of 2,000 metres (6,600 ft) or more located in North Korea. The great majority of the population lives in the plains and lowlands.

Paektu Mountain, the highest point in North Korea at 2,743 metres (8,999 ft), is a volcanic mountain near Manchuria with basalt lava plateau with elevations between 1,400 metres (4,600 ft) and 2,000 metres (6,600 ft) above sea level. The Hamgyong Range, located in the extreme northeastern part of the peninsula, has many high peaks, including Kwanmobong at approximately 2,541 metres (8,337 ft).

Other major ranges include the Rangrim Mountains, which are located in the north-central part of North Korea and run in a north-south direction, making communication between the eastern and western parts of the country rather difficult; and the Kangnam Range, which runs along the North Korea–China border. Kumgangsan, or Diamond Mountain, (approximately 1,638 metres (5,374 ft)) in the Thaebaek Range, which extends into South Korea, is famous for its scenic beauty.

For the most part, the plains are small. The most extensive are the Pyongyang and Chaeryong plains, each covering about 500 km^{2}. Because the mountains on the east coast drop abruptly to the sea, the plains are even smaller there than on the west coast.

The mountain ranges in the northern and eastern parts of North Korea form the watershed for most of its rivers, which run in a westerly direction and empty into the Yellow Sea and Korea Bay. The longest is the Amnok River, which is navigable for 678 km of its 790 kilometres (490 mi). The Tuman River, one of the few major rivers to flow into the Sea of Japan, is the second longest at 521 kilometres (324 mi) but is navigable for only 85 kilometres (53 mi) because of the mountainous topography.

The third longest river, the Taedong River, flows through Pyongyang and is navigable for 245 of its 397 km. Lakes tend to be small because of the lack of glacial activity and the stability of the Earth's crust in the region. Unlike neighboring Japan or northern China, North Korea experiences few severe earthquakes. The country has a number of natural spas and hot springs, which number 124 according to one North Korean source.

== Climate ==
North Korea map of Köppen climate classification zones

Most of North Korea is classified as being of a humid continental climate within the Köppen climate classification scheme, with warm summers and cold, dry winters. In summer, there is a short rainy season called changma.

Long winters bring bitter cold and clear weather interspersed with snowstorms as a result of northern and northwestern winds that blow from Siberia. The daily average high and low temperatures for Pyongyang in January are −3 and −13 °C (27 and 9 °F). On average, it snows thirty-seven days during the winter. Winter can be particularly harsh in the northern, mountainous regions.

Summer tends to be short, hot, humid, and rainy because of the southern and southeastern monsoon winds that bring moist air from the Pacific Ocean. Spring and autumn are transitional seasons marked by mild temperatures and variable winds and bring the most pleasant weather. The daily average high and low temperatures for Pyongyang in August are 29 and 20 °C (84 and 68 °F).

On average, approximately 60% of all precipitation occurs from June to September. Natural hazards include late spring droughts which are often followed by severe flooding. Typhoons affect the peninsula on an average of at least once every summer or early autumn. The drought that started in June 2015, according to the Korean Central News Agency, has been the worst seen in 100 years.

=== Examples ===
Climate data for Pyongyang (1991–2020 normals, extremes 1961–present)
Month	Jan	Feb	Mar	Apr	May	Jun	Jul	Aug	Sep	Oct	Nov	Dec	Year
Record high °C (°F)	10.0 (50.0)	16.0 (60.8)	21.4 (70.5)	28.4 (83.1)	33.9 (93.0)	35.8 (96.4)	35.9 (96.6)	37.8 (100.0)	32.2 (90.0)	28.9 (84.0)	23.2 (73.8)	15.0 (59.0)	37.8 (100.0)
Mean daily maximum °C (°F)	−0.4 (31.3)	3.1 (37.6)	9.7 (49.5)	17.6 (63.7)	23.5 (74.3)	27.5 (81.5)	29.1 (84.4)	29.6 (85.3)	25.7 (78.3)	18.8 (65.8)	9.7 (49.5)	1.4 (34.5)	16.3 (61.3)
Daily mean °C (°F)	−5.4 (22.3)	−2.0 (28.4)	4.0 (39.2)	11.4 (52.5)	17.4 (63.3)	21.9 (71.4)	24.7 (76.5)	25.0 (77.0)	20.2 (68.4)	12.9 (55.2)	4.8 (40.6)	−2.9 (26.8)	11.0 (51.8)
Mean daily minimum °C (°F)	−9.8 (14.4)	−6.6 (20.1)	−0.9 (30.4)	5.9 (42.6)	12.0 (53.6)	17.4 (63.3)	21.4 (70.5)	21.5 (70.7)	15.6 (60.1)	7.8 (46.0)	0.5 (32.9)	−6.8 (19.8)	6.5 (43.7)
Record low °C (°F)	−26.5 (−15.7)	−23.4 (−10.1)	−16.1 (3.0)	−6.1 (21.0)	2.2 (36.0)	7.0 (44.6)	12.0 (53.6)	12.8 (55.0)	3.6 (38.5)	−6.0 (21.2)	−14.0 (6.8)	−22.8 (−9.0)	−26.5 (−15.7)
Average precipitation mm (inches)	9.6 (0.38)	14.5 (0.57)	23.9 (0.94)	44.8 (1.76)	74.7 (2.94)	90.2 (3.55)	274.7 (10.81)	209.6 (8.25)	90.8 (3.57)	47.2 (1.86)	38.4 (1.51)	18.0 (0.71)	936.4 (36.87)
Average precipitation days (≥ 0.1 mm)	3.9	3.7	4.2	5.8	7.1	7.9	12.5	10.1	6.3	5.8	7.1	5.7	80.1
Average snowy days	5.4	4.0	1.8	0.3	0.0	0.0	0.0	0.0	0.0	0.1	1.9	5.5	19.0
Average relative humidity (%)	69.1	65.0	62.5	60.4	65.3	72.2	81.1	80.6	75.3	72.0	72.2	70.6	70.5
Mean monthly sunshine hours	184	197	231	237	263	229	181	204	222	214	165	165	2,492
Average ultraviolet index	2	3	4	6	7	8	9	9	7	4	2	1	5
Source 1: Korea Meteorological Administration
Source 2: Pogodaiklimat.ru (extremes), Deutscher Wetterdienst (sun, 1961–1990) and Weather Atlas

Climate data for Hamhung (1991–2020)
Month	Jan	Feb	Mar	Apr	May	Jun	Jul	Aug	Sep	Oct	Nov	Dec	Year
Mean daily maximum °C (°F)	2.8 (37.0)	5.2 (41.4)	10.4 (50.7)	17.4 (63.3)	22.3 (72.1)	25.3 (77.5)	27.7 (81.9)	28.1 (82.6)	24.8 (76.6)	19.5 (67.1)	11.5 (52.7)	4.8 (40.6)	16.7 (62.1)
Daily mean °C (°F)	−3.4 (25.9)	−1.0 (30.2)	4.2 (39.6)	10.8 (51.4)	16.0 (60.8)	19.8 (67.6)	23.1 (73.6)	23.5 (74.3)	19.0 (66.2)	12.8 (55.0)	5.4 (41.7)	−1.2 (29.8)	10.8 (51.4)
Mean daily minimum °C (°F)	−9.0 (15.8)	−6.7 (19.9)	−1.3 (29.7)	4.6 (40.3)	10.3 (50.5)	15.6 (60.1)	19.6 (67.3)	19.9 (67.8)	14.3 (57.7)	7.3 (45.1)	0.2 (32.4)	−6.3 (20.7)	5.7 (42.3)
Average precipitation mm (inches)	12.3 (0.48)	11.2 (0.44)	20.3 (0.80)	44.9 (1.77)	72.2 (2.84)	85.3 (3.36)	205.0 (8.07)	172.8 (6.80)	95.8 (3.77)	41.8 (1.65)	49.4 (1.94)	19.0 (0.75)	830.0 (32.68)
Average precipitation days (≥ 0.1 mm)	3.6	3.1	4.3	5.4	7.4	8.5	12.4	10.9	6.9	4.6	5.5	3.3	75.9
Average snowy days	4.4	3.5	3.4	0.3	0.1	0.0	0.0	0.0	0.0	0.0	1.3	3.4	16.4
Average relative humidity (%)	63.6	61.2	61.4	61.2	69.4	78.7	84.0	84.7	79.9	71.3	67.0	63.7	70.5
Source: Korea Meteorological Administration

Climate data for Wonsan, North Korea (1991–2020)
Month	Jan	Feb	Mar	Apr	May	Jun	Jul	Aug	Sep	Oct	Nov	Dec	Year
Mean daily maximum °C (°F)	2.6 (36.7)	4.7 (40.5)	9.8 (49.6)	16.7 (62.1)	21.5 (70.7)	24.3 (75.7)	27.0 (80.6)	27.3 (81.1)	23.6 (74.5)	18.7 (65.7)	11.5 (52.7)	4.7 (40.5)	16.0 (60.8)
Daily mean °C (°F)	−1.7 (28.9)	0.4 (32.7)	5.3 (41.5)	11.5 (52.7)	16.5 (61.7)	20.1 (68.2)	23.4 (74.1)	23.8 (74.8)	19.6 (67.3)	14.0 (57.2)	7.2 (45.0)	0.6 (33.1)	11.7 (53.1)
Mean daily minimum °C (°F)	−5.7 (21.7)	−3.8 (25.2)	1.0 (33.8)	6.7 (44.1)	11.9 (53.4)	16.6 (61.9)	20.5 (68.9)	21.0 (69.8)	15.9 (60.6)	9.6 (49.3)	3.0 (37.4)	−3.2 (26.2)	7.8 (46.0)
Average precipitation mm (inches)	21.9 (0.86)	26.9 (1.06)	34.6 (1.36)	58.1 (2.29)	96.1 (3.78)	128.9 (5.07)	319.1 (12.56)	279.3 (11.00)	201.8 (7.94)	76.9 (3.03)	71.6 (2.82)	34.8 (1.37)	1,350 (53.15)
Average precipitation days (≥ 0.1 mm)	4.0	4.0	5.1	6.3	7.7	10.1	13.9	13.2	8.1	6.0	6.1	3.7	88.2
Average snowy days	5.1	4.2	3.7	0.6	0.1	0.0	0.0	0.0	0.0	0.0	0.9	3.3	17.9
Average relative humidity (%)	52.7	54.5	56.5	57.2	67.0	78.2	82.9	83.7	77.9	66.0	58.3	54.2	65.8
Mean monthly sunshine hours	204.6	206.2	232.5	234.0	235.6	207.0	173.6	176.7	198.0	223.2	192.0	192.2	2,475.6
Source 1: Korea Meteorological Administration
Source 2: Wetter Spiegel Online (sunshine only)

Climate data for Nampo (1991–2020)
Month	Jan	Feb	Mar	Apr	May	Jun	Jul	Aug	Sep	Oct	Nov	Dec	Year
Mean daily maximum °C (°F)	−0.5 (31.1)	2.6 (36.7)	8.9 (48.0)	16.5 (61.7)	22.5 (72.5)	26.4 (79.5)	28.5 (83.3)	29.1 (84.4)	25.5 (77.9)	18.9 (66.0)	9.9 (49.8)	1.8 (35.2)	15.8 (60.4)
Daily mean °C (°F)	−4.4 (24.1)	−1.7 (28.9)	3.9 (39.0)	10.8 (51.4)	16.7 (62.1)	21.2 (70.2)	24.3 (75.7)	24.8 (76.6)	20.4 (68.7)	13.7 (56.7)	5.7 (42.3)	−1.8 (28.8)	11.1 (52.0)
Mean daily minimum °C (°F)	−7.9 (17.8)	−5.4 (22.3)	0.0 (32.0)	6.4 (43.5)	12.4 (54.3)	17.7 (63.9)	21.4 (70.5)	21.7 (71.1)	16.6 (61.9)	9.5 (49.1)	2.0 (35.6)	−5.0 (23.0)	7.5 (45.5)
Average precipitation mm (inches)	9.2 (0.36)	12.9 (0.51)	17.3 (0.68)	36.8 (1.45)	67.0 (2.64)	82.0 (3.23)	202.2 (7.96)	166.2 (6.54)	72.4 (2.85)	38.5 (1.52)	38.8 (1.53)	19.6 (0.77)	762.9 (30.04)
Average precipitation days (≥ 0.1 mm)	4.2	3.5	3.7	5.0	6.5	7.0	10.8	8.2	5.5	5.3	6.8	6.0	72.5
Average snowy days	5.2	3.2	1.6	0.1	0.0	0.0	0.0	0.0	0.0	0.0	2.1	5.6	17.8
Average relative humidity (%)	72.1	70.0	69.2	66.6	71.1	78.4	85.8	84.6	77.2	72.4	73.6	72.5	74.5
Source: Korea Meteorological Administration

Climate data for Kaesong (1991–2020)
Month	Jan	Feb	Mar	Apr	May	Jun	Jul	Aug	Sep	Oct	Nov	Dec	Year
Mean daily maximum °C (°F)	1.6 (34.9)	4.6 (40.3)	10.5 (50.9)	17.3 (63.1)	22.8 (73.0)	26.8 (80.2)	28.1 (82.6)	29.3 (84.7)	25.8 (78.4)	20.1 (68.2)	11.3 (52.3)	3.6 (38.5)	16.8 (62.2)
Daily mean °C (°F)	−3.6 (25.5)	−0.8 (30.6)	4.6 (40.3)	11.0 (51.8)	16.7 (62.1)	21.3 (70.3)	24.1 (75.4)	24.9 (76.8)	20.4 (68.7)	13.7 (56.7)	5.9 (42.6)	−1.3 (29.7)	11.4 (52.5)
Mean daily minimum °C (°F)	−8.1 (17.4)	−5.6 (21.9)	−0.3 (31.5)	5.6 (42.1)	11.6 (52.9)	17.1 (62.8)	21.1 (70.0)	21.5 (70.7)	15.9 (60.6)	8.3 (46.9)	1.1 (34.0)	−5.6 (21.9)	6.9 (44.4)
Average precipitation mm (inches)	10.9 (0.43)	19.4 (0.76)	24.7 (0.97)	49.9 (1.96)	95.2 (3.75)	105.7 (4.16)	359.9 (14.17)	285.2 (11.23)	109.9 (4.33)	40.9 (1.61)	40.8 (1.61)	18.3 (0.72)	1,160.8 (45.70)
Average precipitation days (≥ 0.1 mm)	3.3	3.6	4.6	6.3	7.4	8.1	12.8	11.3	5.9	4.7	6.4	4.9	79.3
Average snowy days	4.6	3.1	1.6	0.1	0.0	0.0	0.0	0.0	0.0	0.0	1.4	4.9	15.7
Average relative humidity (%)	67.2	64.7	64.4	66.7	72.9	77.8	85.3	81.8	73.4	70.1	70.3	67.9	71.9
Source: Korea Meteorological Administration

Climate data for Hyesan (1991–2020)
Month	Jan	Feb	Mar	Apr	May	Jun	Jul	Aug	Sep	Oct	Nov	Dec	Year
Mean daily maximum °C (°F)	−8 (18)	−2.8 (27.0)	4.5 (40.1)	13.6 (56.5)	20.8 (69.4)	25.1 (77.2)	27.7 (81.9)	27.0 (80.6)	21.9 (71.4)	14.2 (57.6)	2.9 (37.2)	−6.3 (20.7)	11.7 (53.1)
Daily mean °C (°F)	−15.9 (3.4)	−11.2 (11.8)	−2.7 (27.1)	6.0 (42.8)	12.8 (55.0)	17.5 (63.5)	21.1 (70.0)	20.3 (68.5)	13.8 (56.8)	5.8 (42.4)	−4 (25)	−13.2 (8.2)	4.2 (39.6)
Mean daily minimum °C (°F)	−22.2 (−8.0)	−18.5 (−1.3)	−9.5 (14.9)	−1.1 (30.0)	5.7 (42.3)	11.4 (52.5)	16.0 (60.8)	15.4 (59.7)	7.6 (45.7)	−0.7 (30.7)	−9.6 (14.7)	−19.1 (−2.4)	−2.1 (28.2)
Average precipitation mm (inches)	5.0 (0.20)	9.1 (0.36)	11.6 (0.46)	30.0 (1.18)	62.4 (2.46)	86.8 (3.42)	135.2 (5.32)	112.9 (4.44)	48.9 (1.93)	27.7 (1.09)	19.6 (0.77)	9.8 (0.39)	559.0 (22.01)
Average precipitation days (≥ 0.1 mm)	5.2	4.4	6.1	8.4	12.2	13.8	13.8	12.2	6.9	6.4	6.8	6.5	102.7
Average snowy days	10.9	9.4	10.5	5.9	0.6	0.0	0.0	0.0	0.1	2.5	9.9	13.2	63.0
Average relative humidity (%)	73.3	68.6	63.2	59.6	61.1	69.8	75.3	77.0	72.8	65.9	72.2	74.2	69.4
Source: Korea Meteorological Administration

=== Climate change ===
North Korea is highly vulnerable to the effects of climate change due to its weak food security, which in the past has led to widespread famine. The North Korean Ministry of Land and Environmental Protection estimates that North Korea's average temperature rose by 1.9 °C between 1918 and 2000. In the 2013 edition of Germanwatch's Climate Risk Index, North Korea was judged to be the seventh hardest hit by climate-related extreme weather events of 179 nations during the period 1992–2011.

North Korean carbon dioxide emissions are estimated to be roughly 56.38 million metric tons of CO_{2} in 2021. The vast majority of this is due to North Korea's reliance on coal for energy production. As a result of its mountainous geography as well as the onset of sea level rise and increasing frequency of extreme weather events, the biggest climate change-related concern for North Korea is food security. Low food production in 2017 and 2018 resulted in undernourishment in an estimated 10.3 million people. This has created a high dependency on foreign nations to fulfil food demands. This challenge - along with disruption to economic growth as a result of climate change - might undermine the totalitarian rule of the North Korean government and may be a cause for regime change in the future.

== Environment ==
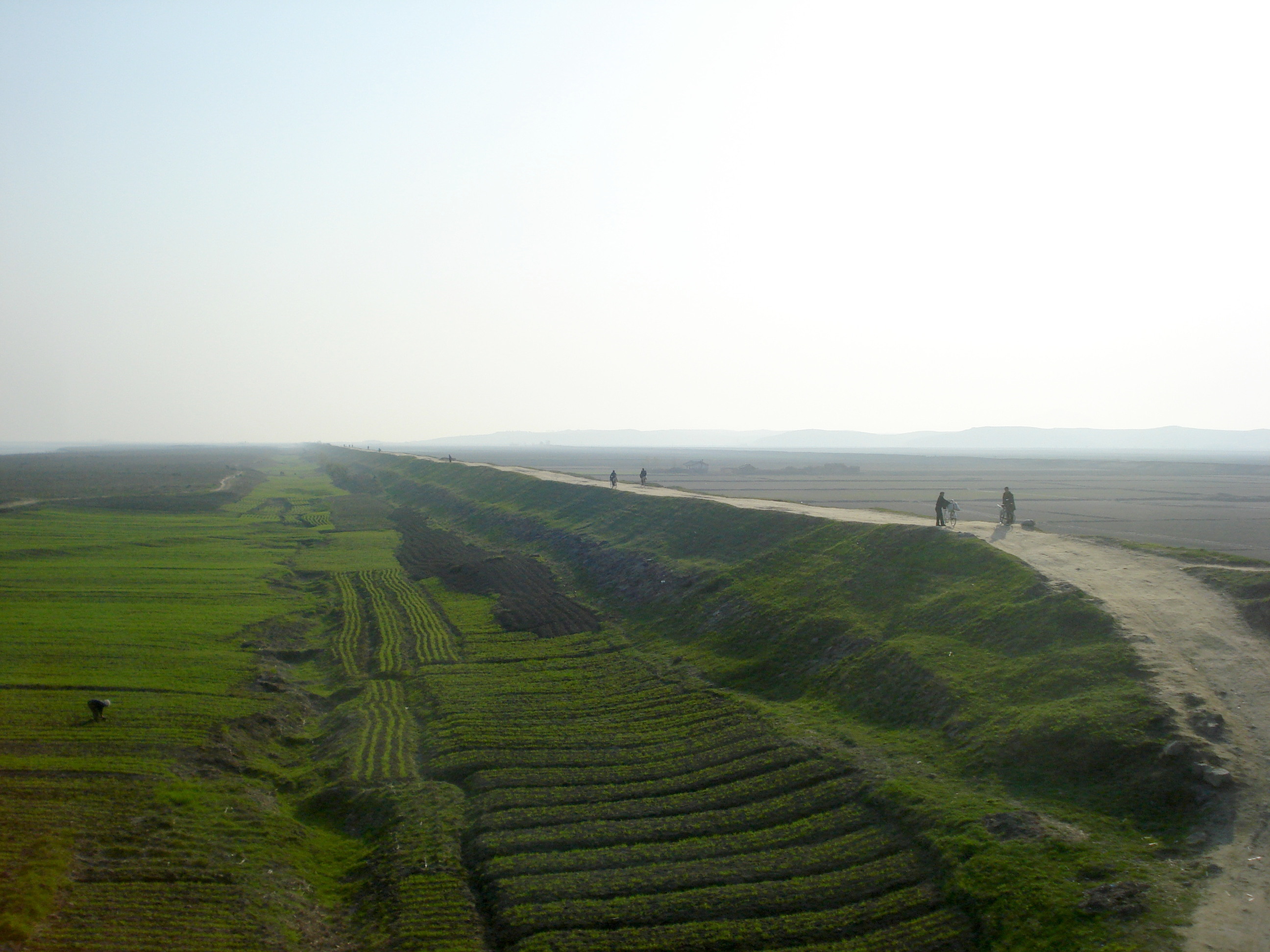
A North Korean agricultural landscape, denuded of trees

The environment of North Korea is diverse, encompassing alpine, forest, farmland, freshwater, and marine ecosystems.

Cultivation, logging, and natural disasters have all put pressure on North Korea's forests. During the economic crisis of the 1990s, deforestation accelerated, as people turned to the woodlands to provide firewood and food. This in turn has led to soil erosion, soil depletion, and increased risk of flooding. In response, the government has promoted a tree planting program. Based on satellite imagery, it was estimated in 2013 that 40% of forest cover had been lost since 1985. A forest restoration policy was adopted in 2012.

== Boundaries, coastline, and islands ==
A satellite image of Korea

North Korea has an area of 120,538 km^{2}, of which 120,408 km^{2} is land and 130 km^{2} is water. It has 1,671.5 kilometres (1,038.6 mi) of land boundaries; of these, 1,416 kilometres (880 mi) are with China, 238 kilometres (148 mi) are with South Korea, and 17.5 kilometres (10.9 mi) are with Russia.

The Korean Peninsula extends about 1,000 kilometres (620 mi) southward from the northeast Asian continental landmass. The 8,460 kilometres (5,260 mi) coastline of Korea is highly irregular, and North Korea accounts for 2,495 kilometres (1,550 mi) of this, roughly one-third. Some 3579 islands lie adjacent to the Korean Peninsula, mostly along the south and west coasts.

The southern stretch of its east coast forms the northern side of the East Korea Bay. At the headland Musu Dan, this ends and the coast turns sharply northward.

A recent global remote sensing analysis suggested that there were 1,483 km^{2} of tidal flats in North Korea, making it the 21st ranked country in terms of tidal flat area.

=== Maritime claims ===
The North Korean government claims territorial waters extending 12 nautical miles (22.2 km; 13.8 mi) from shore. It also claims an exclusive economic zone 200 nautical miles (370.4 km; 230.2 mi) from shore. In addition, a maritime military boundary that lies 50 nautical miles (92.6 km; 57.5 mi) offshore in the Sea of Japan and 200 nautical miles (370.4 km; 230.2 mi) offshore in the Yellow Sea demarcates the waters and airspace into which foreign ships and planes are prohibited from entering without permission.

Waters of the Yellow Sea are demarcated between North Korea and South Korea by the disputed Northern Limit Line drawn by the United Nations Command in early 1950s and not officially recognized by North Korea. Disputes between North and South Korean naval vessels have occurred in this area. A total of five disputes were noteworthy enough to have been reported in the news (three in 2009 and two in 2010).

== Resources and land use ==
Natural resources include coal, petroleum, lead, tungsten, zinc, graphite, magnesite, iron ore, copper, gold, pyrites, salt, fluorspar and hydropower.

=== Land use ===
arable land:	19.5%
permanent crops:	1.9%
permanent pasture	0.4%
forest	46.0%
other:	32.2%

=== Irrigated land ===
- 14,600 km² (2003)

=== Total renewable water resources ===
- 778.15 km^{3} (2011)

=== Freshwater withdrawal (domestic/industrial/agricultural) ===
- total: 8.66 km^{3}/yr (10%/13%/76%)
- per capita: 360.6 m^{3}/yr (2005)

== See also ==
- Administrative divisions of North Korea
- Geography of South Korea
- North Korea Uncovered

Lists:

- List of cities in North Korea
- List of islands of North Korea
- List of lakes in Korea
- List of national parks of Korea
- List of rivers of Korea
- List of mountains in Korea
