= Chasong County =

Coordinates: 41.4608°N 126.6414°E

Chasong County 자성군
- County

Korean transcription(s)
  - Hanja: 慈城郡
  - McCune-Reischauer: Chasŏng kun
  - Revised Romanization: Jaseong-gun
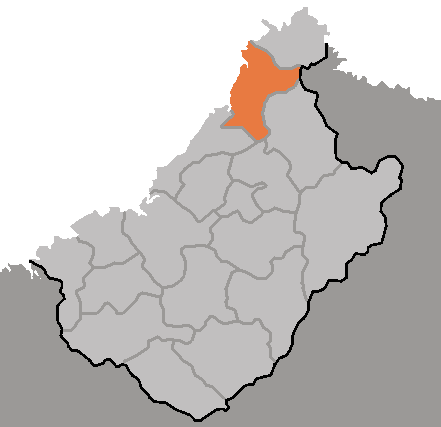
- Map of Chagang showing the location of Chasong
- Country: North Korea
- Province: Chagang Province

Area
  - Total: 864 km^{2} (334 sq mi)

Population (2008)
  - Total: 50,939
  - Density: 59.0/km^{2} (153/sq mi)

Chasŏng County is a county (kun) in Chagang Province, North Korea. The city is immediately south of the Chinese-North Korean border. Its approximate population to 7 km from the city center is 8,317. The average altitude is 1279 feet, or 389 meters. Nearby cities and towns include Haengjangp'yong and Umnae-dong.

== Administrative divisions ==
Chasŏng County is divided into 1 ŭp (town), 1 rodongjagu (workers' district) and 15 ri (villages):

=== County seat (ŭp) ===
MR Name	RR Name	Hangul
Chasŏng-ŭp	Chaseong-eup	차성읍

=== Workers' districts (rodongjagu) ===
MR Name	RR Name	Hangul
Unbong-rodongjagu	Unbong-rodongjagu	은봉로동자구

=== Villages (ri) ===
MR Name	RR Name	Hangul
Chajang-ri	Chajang-ri	차장리
Horye-ri	Horye-ri	호례리
Kujungyŏng-ri	Gujungyeong-ri	구중영리
Kwanp'yŏng-ri	Gwanpyeong-ri	관평리
Kwi'il-li	Gwiil-ri	귀일리
Pŏptong-ri	Beoptong-ri	법동리
Ryangdŏng-ri	Ryangdeong-ri	량동리
Ryusam-ri	Ryusam-ri	류삼리
Samgŏ-ri	Samgeo-ri	삼거리
Sangp'yŏng-ri	Sangpyeong-ri	상평리
Sinp'ung-ri	Sinpung-ri	신풍리
Song'am-ri	Songam-ri	송암리
Taenam-ri	Taenam-ri	태남리
Yŏksu-ri	Yeoksu-ri	역수리
Yŏnp'ung-ri	Yeonpung-ri	연풍리
