= Chagang Province =

Province of North Korea

Coordinates: 40.9706°N 126.5925°E

Chagang Province 자강도
- Province

Korean transcription(s)
  - Chosŏn'gŭl: 자강도
  - Hancha: 慈江道
  - McCune-Reischauer: Chagang-do
  - Revised Romanization: Jagang-do
- Country: North Korea
- Region: Kwansŏ
- Capital: Kanggye
- Subdivisions: 3 cities; 15 counties

Government
  - Provincial Party Committee Chief Secretary: Park Seong-cheol (WPK)
  - Provincial People's Committee Chairman: Shin Chang-gil

Area
  - Total: 16,613 km^{2} (6,414 sq mi)

Population (2008)
  - Total: 1,299,830
  - Density: 78.242/km^{2} (202.65/sq mi)
- Time zone: UTC+9 (Pyongyang Time)
- Dialect: Pyongan

Chagang Province (Korean: 자강도; MR: Chagang-do; Korean pronunciation: [tɕa.ɡaŋ.do]) is a province of North Korea; it is bordered by China's Jilin and Liaoning provinces to the north, Ryanggang and South Hamgyong to the east, South Pyongan to the south, and North Pyongan to the west. Chagang was formed in 1949, after being demarcated from North Pyongan. The provincial capital is Kanggye. Before 2019, Chagang was the only province of North Korea completely inaccessible to tourists, possibly due to weapons factories and nuclear weapon facilities located there. In 2019 the city of Manpo became accessible to tourists. In May 2018, the province became a "Special Songun (military first) Revolutionary Zone" in relations to concealing the nuclear weapon and weapon's factories within the province.

== Geography ==
Chagang Province is located in the northwestern part of Korea. It is a mountainous province; with the mountainous area amounting to 98 per cent of its total area. The mean height above sea level is 750 meters and the slope of most regions is 15 to 40 degrees.

The province has a distinct continental climate under the influence of the Asian continent. It has very cold and long winters, and brief springs and falls. The climate is characterized by great differences in daily and yearly temperature. In summer, downpours of rain and hail are frequent. Thus thunder and lightning occur frequently.

The province has great mineral wealth, and is North Korea's main source of lead, zinc, gold, copper, molybdenum, tungsten, antimony, graphite, apatite, alunite, limestone, calcium carbonate, anthracite and iron ores. There are also crystals and valuable gems there.

== Main cities and economic activities ==
The province abounds in underground, forest and water resources. Before the Korean War, Chagang province was an isolated land with only two primitive mines, one timber mill and a distillery.

Nowadays, it has power, machine, chemical, light, mining and timber industries. Its total industrial output is 1000 times as much as just before the war.

The majority of North Korea's underground military industrial facilities are located in Chagang Province, including portions of their weapons of mass destruction program.

Kanggye is the capital city of Chagang Province. One of the main economic timber processing factories of the province, and the country, is located in Kanggye.

Huichon is the most developed city in the province, though. Its development dates back to the Korean War, when it became one of the cities of industrial relocation, as it was isolated and far from the main battlefields.

Nowadays, Huichon has several industries, such as a huge machine tool factory, silk mill and a hard glassware factory. In Huichon there is the main North Korean University of Telecommunications.

Chagang was one of the less developed and isolated provinces in North Korea after liberation in 1945. The terrain made farming difficult and only slash-and-burn farmers tilled mountain plots to eke out a living.

Nowadays, farming activities are mainly linked with livestock activities. One example is Hungju Farm.

== Tourism in Chagang Province ==
The Chagang Province for a while was the only province in North Korea that tourists could not go to. The main reason believed to be why they were not allowed to was due to the province being home to weapons and nuclear weapon factories and sites. Prior to April 2019, the only part that was accessible for tourists in the Chagang Province was the Huichon Hotel.

However, in April 2019, the province was opened to tourists in which they could go to the city of Manpo. The city is located right across the river from China.

== Small and medium-size power stations ==
The province has been converted into a power base for the country, with the construction of Kanggye Youth Power Station, Unbong Power Station, Jangjagang Power Station and other large hydroelectric power stations. The chief hydropower engineer of the city is Kihan Sung.

The province has built since the 90s many small and medium-sized power stations, as a duty of the local authorities. Log-dam, water-course, raft and sluice were among the efficient methods practised in their construction.

Small hydraulic turbines, with a capacity of 2 kW to 70 kW, were developed by local technicians to dramatically increase the generating capacity.

== Administrative divisions ==
Chagang is divided into 3 cities (si) and 15 counties (gun).

Name	Chosongul	Hanja	Population (2008)	Subdivisions
City
Huichon	희천시	熙川市	168,180	21 dong, 12 ri
Kanggye (capital)	강계시	江界市	251,971	34 dong, 2 ri
Manpo	만포시	滿浦市	116,760	11 dong, 15 ri
County
Changgang County	장강군	長江郡	54,601	1 up, 3 rodongjagu, 10 ri
Chasong County	자성군	慈城郡	50,939	1 up, 1 rodongjagu, 15 ri
Chonchon County	전천군	前川郡	106,311	1 up, 5 rodongjagu, 11 ri
Chosan County	초산군	楚山郡	43,614	1 up, 18 ri
Chunggang County	중강군	中江郡	41,022	1 up, 1 rodongjagu, 8 ri
Hwapyong County	화평군	和坪郡	42,183	1 up, 3 rodongjagu, 10 ri
Hyangsan County	향산군	香山郡	52,350	1 up, 20 ri
Kopung County	고풍군	古豐郡	31,572	1 up, 12 ri
Rangrim County	랑림군	狼林郡	36,481	1 up, 2 rodongjagu, 14 ri
Ryongrim County	룡림군	龍林郡	32,727	1 up, 12 ri
Sijung County	시중군	時中郡	41,842	1 up, 14 ri
Songgan County	성간군	城干郡	92,952	1 up, 5 rodongjagu, 9 ri
Songwon County	송원군	松原郡	38,051	1 up, 12 ri
Tongsin County	동신군	東新郡	47,460	1 up, 14 ri
Usi County	우시군	雩時郡	42,919	1 up, 1 rodongjagu, 22 ri
Wiwon County	위원군	渭原郡	60,245	1 up, 2 rodongjagu, 20 ri

== See also ==
- Outline of North Korea
