= Energy in North Korea =

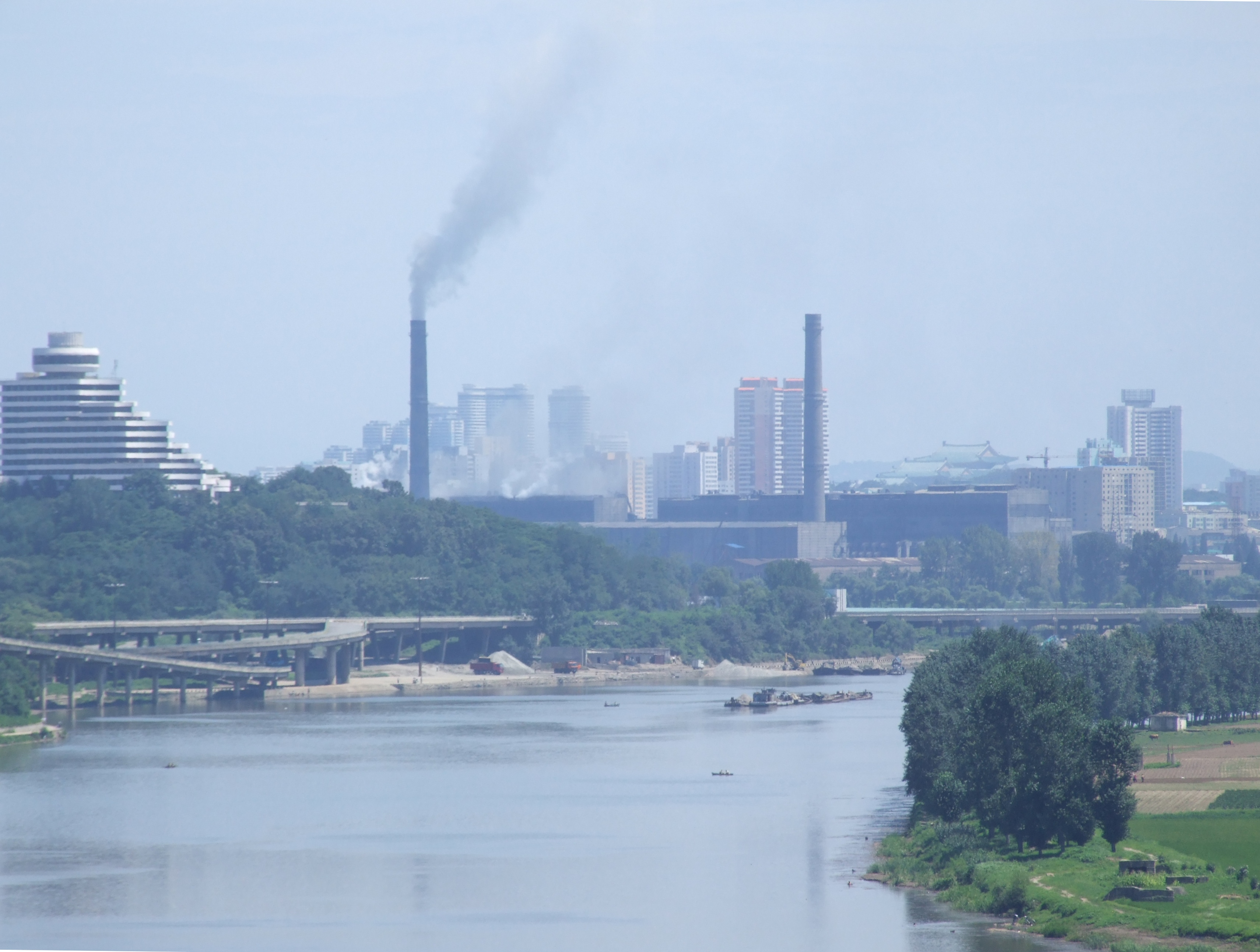
Pyongchon Thermal Power Station generates electricity for central Pyongyang.

Energy in North Korea describes energy and electricity production, consumption and import in North Korea.

Primary energy use in North Korea was 224 TWh and 9 TWh per million people in 2009. The country's primary sources of power are hydro and coal after Kim Jong Il implemented plans that saw the construction of large hydroelectric power stations across the country.

According to The World Bank, in 2021, 52.63% of North Korea's population had access to electricity. Many households are restricted to 2 hours' power per day due to priority being given to manufacturing plants.

== Overview ==
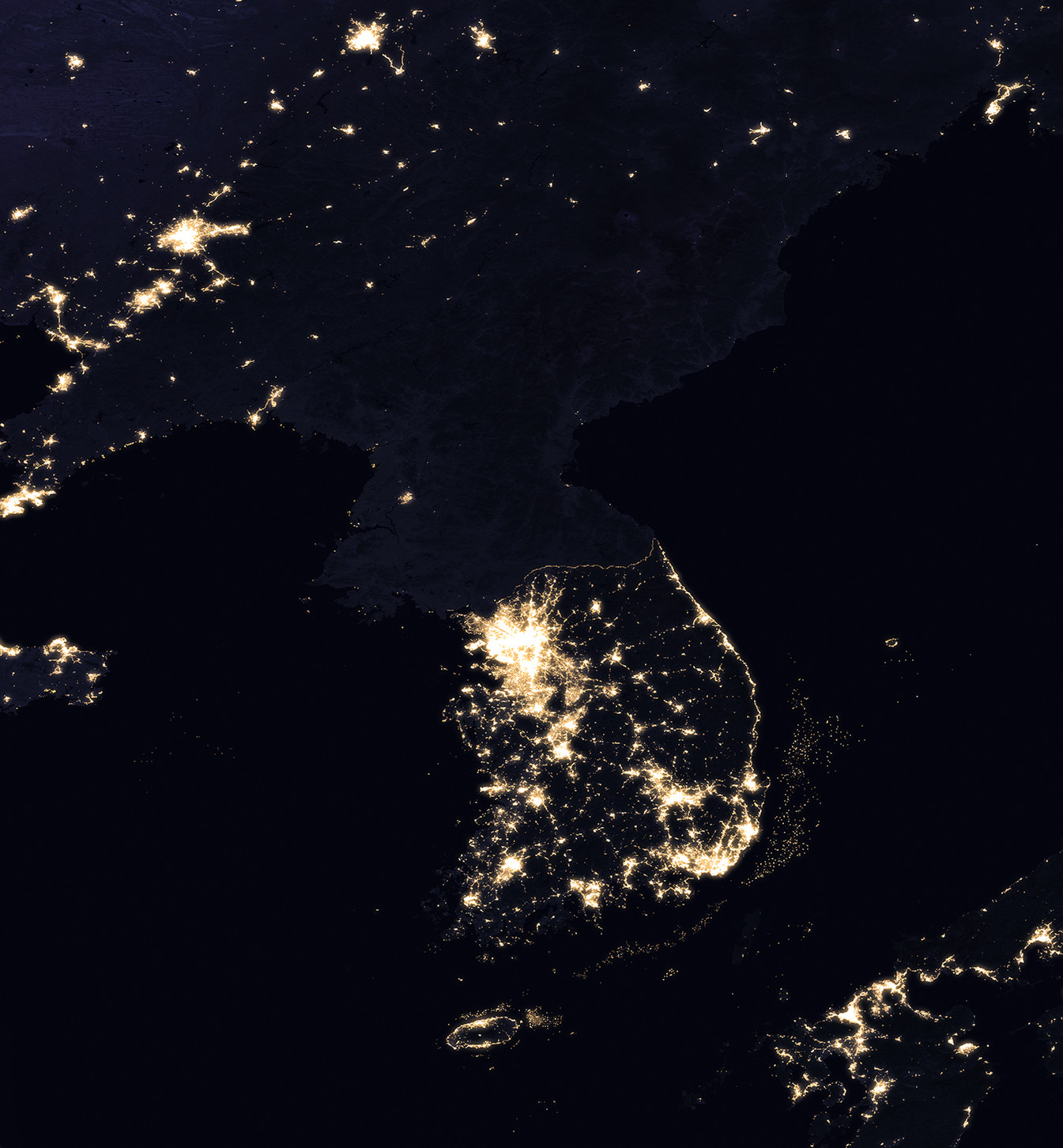
Imagery of the Korean Peninsula at night, showing that North Korea is in almost complete darkness due to a lack of electricity

Energy in North Korea
	Capita	Prim. energy	Production	Export	Electricity	CO_{2}-emission
	Million	TWh	TWh	TWh	TWh	Mt
2004	22.38	237	223	-15	18.50	70.20
2007	23.78	214	229	15	18.12	62.32
2008	23.86	236	242	6	19.54	69.37
2009	23.91	224	236	12	17.76	66.20
2012	24.45				18.21	64.82
2012R	24.76	164	236	72	16.20	45.42
2013	24.90	168	280	112	16.44	47.68
Change 2004-09	6.8%	-5.4%	5.5%	-	-4.0%	-5.7%
Mtoe = 11.63 TWh, Prim. energy includes energy losses that are 2/3 for nuclear power 2012R = CO2 calculation criteria changed, numbers updated

== Per capita electricity consumption ==
According to statistics compiled by the South Korean agency, Statistics Korea, based on International Energy Agency (IEA) data, per capita electricity consumption fell from its peak in 1990 of 1247 kilowatt hours to a low of 712 kilowatt hours in 2000. It has slowly risen since to 819 kilowatt hours in 2008, a level below that of 1970.

In 2017 many homes were using small standalone photovoltaic systems. In 2019 it was estimated 55% of North Korean households used solar panels.

By 2019, electricity production had reached a level where any supply blackouts were of relatively short durations.

== Oil imports ==
North Korea imports crude oil from a pipeline that originates in Dandong, China. The crude oil is refined at the Ponghwa Chemical Factory in Sinuiju, North Korea. North Korea has a smaller oil refinery, the Sŭngri Refinery, on its Russian border. The country had been able to import oil from China and the Soviet Union for below market prices, but with the end of the Cold War, these deals were not renewed, leading to an explosive rise in oil prices for Pyongyang and a drop in imports.

North Korea imports jet fuel, diesel fuel, and gasoline from two refineries in Dalian, China, which arrive at the North Korean port of Nampo.

== Power facilities ==
North Korea is reliant on hydro power, which leads to shortages in winter, when there is little rainfall and ice blocks the flow of rivers. Power plants that were never completed/ started up are shown in Salmon

Name	Location	Installed capacity	Notes
Huichon Hydroelectric Power Station	Huichon	300 MW	Allegedly fails to generate power at full capacity due to harsh weather.
Sup'ung Dam	Yalu River	630 MW (Note: capacity shared between China and North Korea)	Units 3, 6, 7 generate power to North Korea; unit 2 can generate either for China or North Korea. The power plant is operated by North Korea. Seven 90 MW units.
Unbong Dam	Yalu River	430 MW	Units 2, 4 supply power to North Korea. The power plant is operated by North Korea.
Taipingwan Dam	Yalu River	190 MW	Operated by China.
Wiwon Dam	Yalu River	222.5 MW	
Kumyagang Power Station No.2	Kumya County	7.5 MW	
Kumyagang Army-People Power Station	Kumya County	large	
Yonsan	Yonsan County	small	2 small generators
Tanchon Power Station No.1 to 6	Tanchon	small to medium	series of 6 small to medium size hydropower stations.
Hungju Youth Hydroelectric Power Station No. 1 to 3	Kanggye	small	series of 3 small hydropower stations.
Jangjagang Hydroelectric Power Station	Manpo	90 MW	series of small hydropower stations.
Pukchon	Kanggye	small	small hydropower stations.
Kanggye Youth Power Station	Kanggye	224.6 MW	
Paektusan Hero Youth Power station	Sodusu River	large	series of 3 power hydropower stations.
Taechon Hydroelectric Power Station	Taeryong River	746 MW	Series of hydropower plants on the Taeryong River.
Taeryong Hydroelectric Power Station	Taeryong River	small to medium	Series of hydropower plants on the Taeryong River.
Huchang Mine No. 4 Power Station	Kimhyongjik County	small	Built to support Huchang mine.
Pukchang Thermal Power Complex	Pukchang County	1600 MW	Highest generation capacity of power plants in North Korea.
Pyongyang Thermal Power Plant	Pyongchon-guyok	700 MW	
Kangdong Thermal Power Plant	Kangdong County	between 100 and 300 MW	Construction began in late 2010, but stalled sometime after 2014
Sunchon Thermal Power Plant	Sunchon	210 MW	
Sonbong Thermal Electric Power Plant	Sonbong-guyok	200 MW	Originally named Unggi Thermoelectric Power Plant, and powered by heavy fuel oil from Sŭngri Petrochemical Complex. Rebuilt to use coal from 2015. Also known as 6.16 Power Station.
Nyongbyon Nuclear Scientific Research Center – experimental light-water reactor	Nyongbyon County	20 MW	Probably conducting pre-operational testing.
Korean Energy Development Organisation – two light water reactors.	Sinpo	2000 MW	Abandoned due to US withdrawal from Agreed Framework.
March 17 Power Plant	Chongjin (Unit 1)	200 MW	
March 17 Power Plant	Puryong County (Unit 2, 3)	310 MW	
Chongjin Thermal Power Plant	Chongjin	150 MW	Supplies to industry, such as the Kim Chaek Iron and Steel Complex.
Hochongang Power Station	Hochon County	40.6 MW	series of hydroelectric stations on the Hochon river.
Changjingang Power Station	Yonggwang County	34.7 MW	series of hydroelectric stations on the Changjin river.
Puryong Power Station	Puryong County	32 MW	series of hydroelectric stations in Puryong county.
Pujongang Power Station	Sinhung County	203.7 MW	
Anbyon Youth Power Station	Anbyon County	324 MW	Original design capacity 810 MW.
Taedonggang Power Station	Tokchon	200 MW	
Namgang Power Station	Kangdong County	135 MW	Fed by a gravity dam, also serves to prevent flooding of the Taedong River and supply water for agricultural purposes.
Chonchongang Thermal Power Station	Kaechon	200 MW	Supplies to industrial complexes, such as the Namhung Youth Chemical Complex in Anju.
East Pyongyang Thermal Power Station	Rangnang-guyok	100 MW	
December 12 Thermal Power Station	Chollima-guyok	50 MW	Originally planned three generators of 50 MW each, only one built. Supplies electricity to Chollima Steel Complex.
Ryesonggang Youth Hydropower Plant No. 1 to 5	Kumchon County	50 MW	Series of five power plants on the Ryeson River, with five power stations of four generators each, producing 2.5 MW. No.1 was started up in 2008, with the last being completed in 2018.
Wonsan Army-People Power Station	Popdong County	20 MW	Two 10 MW turbines on the Rimjin River.
Hamhung Hydropower Station No.1	Chongpyong County	10 MW	Two 4 MW and a 2 MW generator on Kumjin River.
Orangchon Power Stations	North Hamgyong Province	134.5 MW	Hydroelectric power project including 4 dams and 5 power stations.
Sinuiju Solar Power Station	Sinuiju	1 MW	73 48-panel array, one 30-panel array and one 60-panel array.
Kumsanpho Fishery Solar Power Station	Cholsan County	small	2880 panels in total, can generate "hundreds of kw"
Kangwon Army-People Power Stations	Kangwon Province	small to medium	Series of 6 Army-People hydropower stations in Hoeyang, Ichon, Munchon, Sepho, Phyonggang and Kosong counties.
Haeju Solar Power Station	South Hamgyong Province	10 MW	
Phabal Solar Power Station	Ryanggang Province	small	Capacity of "thousands of kilowatts"
Samgwang Solar Farm	North Pyongan Province	small	~800 panels installed on a hillside.
South Phyongan Solar Power Plant	South Pyongan Province	small	Several hundred panels along the Pyongsong riverbank. Projected to expand to a capacity of "thousands of kilowatts"
Hamhung Solar Power Station	South Hamgyong Province	small	58 solar panel arrays along the bank of the Songchon River.

== Introduction of renewable rural energy during the 2010 decade ==
From 2010 onward, international NGO and UN Agencies have introduced novel, renewable energy solutions for rural areas. A former UN Coordinator describes the energy situation in rural areas, taking as example the County of Hoechang, described in much detail. For example, a 2009 UN study found that Hoechang county's population of 90,000 people consumed 1,112 megawatts per hours, which equated to 12 kilowatts per households per year or 1,000 times less energy consumed than a standard US household. The author describes solutions being implemented, notably, small hydropower and wind turbines, solar panels and gasifiers.

== See also ==
- Mining in North Korea
- Nuclear power in North Korea
- Economy of North Korea
