= Obongsan =

Obongsan may refer to:

- Obongsan (Boseong), mountain of Jeollanam-do, southwestern South Korea
- Obongsan (Gyeongju), mountain of Gyeongsangbuk-do, eastern South Korea
- Obongsan (Haman/Jinju), mountain of Gyeongsangnam-do, southeastern South Korea
- Obongsan (Hoengseong/Pyeongchang), mountain of Gangwon-do, South Korea
- Obongsan (Hwacheon/Chuncheon), mountain in the county of Hwacheon, Gangwon-do in South Korea
- Obongsan (North Jeolla), mountain of Jeollabuk-do, western South Korea
- Obongsan (Sangju), mountain of Gyeongsangbuk-do, eastern South Korea
- Obongsan (South Chungcheong), mountain of Chungcheongnam-do, western South Korea
- Obongsan (Wondo), mountain of Jeollanam-do, southwestern South Korea
- Obongsan (Yangsan), mountain of Gyeongsangnam-do, southeastern South Korea
- Obongsan (Chagang), mountain of Chagang-do in North Korea
- Obongsan (Kosong–Kumgang), mountain of Kangwon-do in North Korea
- Obongsan (South Hamgyong), mountain of Hamgyongnam-do in North Korea

== See also ==
- Bongshang
- Pongsan
- Yebongsan
