= Ripa station =

Railway station in North Korea

Rip'a 리파

Korean name
- Hangul: 리파역
- Hanja: 梨坡驛
- Revised Romanization: Ripa-yeok
- McCune–Reischauer: Rip'a-yŏk

General information
- Location: Rip'a-ri, Tanch'ŏn, South Hamgyŏng; North Korea
- Coordinates: 40.7619°N 128.8553°E
- Owner: Korean State Railway
- Platforms: 2 (1 island)
- Tracks: 2

History
- Opened: 4 December 1943

Services
Preceding station	Korean State Railway	Following station
Sinjŭngsan towards Muhak	Kumgol Line	Sinp'yŏng towards Yŏhaejin
Location

Rip'a station is a railway station in Rip'a-ri, greater Tanch'ŏn city, South Hamgyŏng province, North Korea, on the Kŭmgol Line of the Korean State Railway. It was opened on 4 December 1943 along with the rest of the Tongam–Paekkŭmsan section of the line.
