= Sinpyong station =

Railway station in North Korea

Sinp'yŏng 신평

Korean name
- Hangul: 신평역
- Hanja: 新坪驛
- Revised Romanization: Sinpyeong-yeok
- McCune–Reischauer: Sinp'yŏng-yŏk

General information
- Location: Sinp'yŏng-ri, Tanch'ŏn, South Hamgyŏng; North Korea
- Coordinates: 40.7158°N 128.8652°E
- Owner: Korean State Railway
- Platforms: 1
- Tracks: 1

History
- Opened: 4 December 1943

Services
Preceding station	Korean State Railway	Following station
Rip'a towards Muhak	Kumgol Line	Such'on towards Yŏhaejin
Location

Sinp'yŏng station is a railway halt in Sinp'yŏng-ri, greater Tanch'ŏn city, South Hamgyŏng province, North Korea, on the Kŭmgol Line of the Korean State Railway. It was opened on 4 December 1943 along with the rest of the Tongam–Paekkŭmsan section of the line.
