= Sinjungsan station =

Railway station in North Korea

Sinjŭngsan 신증산

Korean name
- Hangul: 신증산역
- Hanja: 新甑山驛
- Revised Romanization: Sinjeungsan-yeok
- McCune–Reischauer: Sinjŭngsan-yŏk

General information
- Location: Chŭngsal-li, Tanch'ŏn, South Hamgyŏng; North Korea
- Coordinates: 40.8234°N 128.8681°E
- Owner: Korean State Railway
- Platforms: 2 (1 island)
- Tracks: 2

History
- Opened: 4 December 1943

Services
Preceding station	Korean State Railway	Following station
Tonsan towards Muhak	Kumgol Line	Rip'a towards Yŏhaejin
Location

Sinjŭngsan station is a railway station in Chŭngsal-li, greater Tanch'ŏn city, South Hamgyŏng province, North Korea, on the Kŭmgol Line of the Korean State Railway. It was opened on 4 December 1943 along with the rest of the Tongam–Paekkŭmsan section of the line.
