= Taptong station =

Railway station in North Korea

Taptong 답동

Korean name
- Hangul: 답동역
- Hanja: 畓洞驛
- Revised Romanization: Dapdong-yeok
- McCune–Reischauer: Taptong-yŏk

General information
- Location: Taptong-ri, Tanch'ŏn, South Hamgyŏng; North Korea
- Coordinates: 40.5085°N 128.9564°E
- Owner: Korean State Railway
- Platforms: 2 (1 island)
- Tracks: 2 + 1 siding

History
- Opened: 30 March 1943

Services
Preceding station	Korean State Railway	Following station
Kaŭng towards Muhak	Kumgol Line	Ch'ŏn'gok towards Yŏhaejin
Location

Taptong station is a railway station in Taptong-ri, greater Tanch'ŏn city, South Hamgyŏng province, North Korea, on the Kŭmgol Line of the Korean State Railway. It was opened on 30 March 1943 along with the rest of the Yŏhaejin–Tongam section of the line.
