= Kwangchon station =

Railway station in North Korea

Kwangch'ŏn 광천

Korean name
- Hangul: 광천역
- Hanja: 廣泉驛
- Revised Romanization: Gwangcheon-yeok
- McCune–Reischauer: Kwangch'ŏn-yŏk

General information
- Location: Kwangch'ŏn-dong, Tanch'ŏn, South Hamgyŏng; North Korea
- Coordinates: 40.5619°N 128.9944°E
- Owner: Korean State Railway
- Platforms: 2 (1 island)
- Tracks: 2 (+ 3 sidings)

History
- Opened: 30 March 1943

Services
Preceding station	Korean State Railway	Following station
Unjŏn towards Muhak	Kumgol Line	Kaŭng towards Yŏhaejin
Location

Kwangch'ŏn station is a railway station in Kwangch'ŏn-dong, greater Tanch'ŏn city, South Hamgyŏng province, North Korea, on the Kŭmgol Line of the Korean State Railway. It was opened on 30 March 1943 along with the rest of the Yŏhaejin–Tongam section of the line; the station was originally called Yongjam station (Chosōn'gŭl: 용잠역; Hanja: 龍岑驛), receiving its current name after the establishment of the DPRK.
