= List of mountains of North Korea =

The following is a list of mountains in North Korea

== List ==
=== Pyongyang ===
- Taesongsan (대성산; 大成山) – 270 metres (890 ft)

=== Chagang Province ===
- Namsan (남산; 南山) – 539 metres (1,768 ft)
- Obongsan (오봉산; 五峰山) – 1,180 metres (3,870 ft)

=== North Pyongan Province ===
- Myohyangsan (묘향산; 妙香山) – 1,909 metres (6,263 ft)

=== South Hwanghae Province ===
- Kuwolsan (구월산; 九月山) – 954 metres (3,130 ft)
- Maebongsan (매봉산; 梅峰山) – 197 metres (646 ft)
- Namsan (남산; 南山) – 122 metres (400 ft)
- Namsan (남산; 南山) – 148 metres (486 ft)

=== Kangwon Province ===
- Kumgangsan (금강산; 金剛山) – 1,638 metres (5,374 ft)
- Maebongsan (매봉산; 梅峰山) – 1,578 metres (5,177 ft)
- Obongsan (오봉산; 五峰山) – 1,264 metres (4,147 ft)

=== South Hamgyong Province ===
- Madaesan (마대산; 馬垈山) – 1,745 metres (5,725 ft)
- Obongsan (오봉산; 五峰山) – 1,289 metres (4,229 ft)
- Puksubaeksan (북수백산; 北水白山) – 2,522 metres (8,274 ft), the third tallest mountain in Korea.

=== North Hamgyong Province ===
- Chilbosan (칠보산; 七寶山) – 906 metres (2,972 ft)
- Mantapsan (만탑산; 萬塔山) – 2,205 metres (7,234 ft)
- Kwanmobong (관모봉; 冠帽峯) – 2,541 metres (8,337 ft), the second tallest mountain in Korea.

=== Ryanggang Province ===
- Paektusan (백두산; 白頭山) – 2,744 metres (9,003 ft), the tallest mountain in North Korea and the entire Korean Peninsula.
- Chailbong (차일봉; 遮日峯) – 2,506 metres (8,222 ft), the 4th tallest mountain in Korea.
