= Mining in North Korea =

Mining in North Korea is important to the country's economy. North Korea is naturally abundant in metals such as magnesite, zinc, tungsten, and iron; with magnesite resources of 6 billion tonnes (second largest in the world), particularly in the North and South Hamgyong Provinces, as well as the Chagang Province. However, often these cannot be mined due to the acute shortage of electricity in the country, as well as the lack of proper tools to mine these materials and an antiquated industrial base. Coal, iron ore, limestone, and magnesite deposits are larger than other mineral commodities. Mining joint ventures have occurred with other countries including China and South Korea.

== Resource base ==
North Korea has reserves of more than 200 mineral types distributed over 80% of its territory with ten reserves recording large deposits of magnetite, tungsten ore, graphite, gold, and molybdenum. Among the largest resources high estimated reserve are: 21 million tons of zinc; non-metallic resource of 100 billion tons of limestone and 6 billion tons of magnesite; and other mineral sources such as 5 billion tons of iron, 5 billion tons of anthracite, 3 million tons of copper, 2 million tons of barite, 2 million tons of graphite, and 2 thousand tons of gold.

The mineral industry in the country is structured under three broad sectors namely, coal mining, ferrous and nonferrous metals mining, and processing sector and industrial minerals mining and processing sector. All these sectors are owned by the central government and it is also reported that the mineral industry supports the country's military budget.

== Metal mining ==
North Korea is thought to have tremendous potential metal resources (and particularly rare-earth metals), which have been valued in excess of US$6 trillion by the South Korean national mining company. There is much investment from Chinese mining companies, with an estimated $500 million investment in the last 11 years. 41% of all Chinese companies trading in North Korea are involved in mining.

=== Zinc mining ===
The Korea General Zinc Industry Group is a North Korean mining and industrial group headquartered in Pyongyang. The organization produces zinc, lead, base bullion, lead concentrates, zinc concentrates, cadmium, arsenic, zinc residues and copper concentrate for export and domestic use.

The Komdok mine, located in Kumgol-dong, Tanchon, South Hamgyong Province, has been in operation since 1932 and is the largest zinc mine in East Asia. It has seven mine blocks extracted through ten mines. It has annual capacity to handle 10 million tons of zinc ore. Conventional flotation methods are adopted to extract lead and zinc concentrates. Other products from the mine are sphalerite, chalcopyrite, and galena. The mining area was damaged in the 2020 Pacific typhoon season, and its redevelopment was a priority for the North Korean government.

=== Gold mining ===
In gold alone the nation is estimated to hold around 2,000 metric tonnes of reserves, which at a gold value of $58,700/kilo, would give a total worth of $117.4 billion.

The Daebong Mine, located on the border of Kapsan County and Unhung County in Ryanggang Province, produced more than 150 kilograms (kg) (4,823 troy ounces) of gold annually. Further improvements are proposed in this mine with Chinese investment under a package of offer of mineral rights in exchange for capital investment in the mine.

The Sangnong mine, in Hochon County has been in operation since 1956 and is an underground mine. The mine also extracts pyrite, chalcopyrite, magnesite, native gold, and native silver. In 2008, the annual production was reported as 290,000 tons of concentrate at a grade of 30g/t. To process the low-grade concentrate of the Sangnong Mine, the Dongdae Custom Mill Plant (located in Tanchon city) has been established. This plant has processed twenty million tons of tailings and the waste piled up in the yard of the plant has still a gold pf grade of 1.44g/t.

The Holdong mine in the Holdong-rodongjagu in Yonsan-gun has been in operation since 1893. Gold and other ores are found in a strike of 1,200 metres (3,900 ft) strip. The plant has capacity for annual handling of 2 tonnes of gold, 2.5 tonnes of silver, and 80,000 tonnes of copper concentrate. In 1991, the mine recorded a production of 0.85 tonnes of gold, 1.674 tonnes of silver, and 893 tonnes of copper concentrate.

=== Copper mining ===
The DPRK is estimated to hold a total amount of 2.1 million metric tonnes of copper metal. The Korea Mining Development Trading Corporation (KOMID) was involved in a joint-development project with a Chinese firm in the development of a copper mine in Hyesan. However, KOMID was blacklisted by the United Nations in 2009 subsequent to North Korea's April 5 rocket launch. This resulted in a halting of facility construction at Hyesan. The Hyesan copper mine, located Yanggang Province would be operated by the Hyesan-China Joint Venture Mineral Co.

The Hyesan mine, located in Masan-dong, Hyesan-si has been in operation since 1970 and is the largest copper mine in the country. It was flooded and hence closed from 1994 to 2009 and has been partially reopened, after bailing out water, since 2010. Other products from the mine are chalcocite, chalcopyrite, galena, and sphalerite. The plant has a capacity to handle 1,200,000 tons of copper ore annually. According to a 1993 report, the mine produced about 90,000 tons of concentrate of 16% grade of copper.

=== Iron ore mining ===
Musan mine, located at Musan County, in the Ch'angryŏl-rodongjagu and Hamgyeongbuk-do, was first operated by Mitsubishi Mining Company of Japan in 1935. After Japan's defeat in World War II and the Korean War, the mine resumed operations under the Communist government of North Korea (DPRK) in the 1950s, although initial production under DPRK authority was extremely low. The ore is found a strike strip of 1200 m and is operated through nine blocks and extraction is by open pit method. Its iron ore handling capacity is 10 million tons per year. The annual production is reported to be 2 million tons of iron concentrate of 65% grade. After processing at the Gimchaek Steel Mill, iron is exported to China.

The Oryong Mine, located in Ryongchol-ri, Hoeryong, in Hamgyeongbuk-do, has been in operation since 2007. Iron ore is embedded in granite formations as magnetite, hematite, and ilmenite in the Musan group and Liwon-am group of rocks, and the ore extracted in directly transported to China without milling. The ore exported in 2007 was of the order of 3,000 tons.

=== Uranium mining ===
The Pyongsan uranium mine, adjacent to the Ryesong River located in Pyongsan County, is the only operational uranium mine in North Korea. North Korean officials asked International Atomic Energy Agency (IAEA) to leave the country in 2009, who had not inspected the mine since 1992. This means North Korea is not bound by the Non-Proliferation of Nuclear Weapons Safeguards Agreement. Despite multiple typhoons in 2020, the facility itself was not damaged. Satellite photos revealed changed vegetation in 2021, causing a team at Stanford University to believe North Korea had expanded the mine since 2009.

Several sinkholes around the mine were discovered in 2023 via satellite imagery, due to a series of cave-ins. It is believed the collapses occurred due to a lack of structural support in new mined-out areas. The collapses were highly unlikely to affect mining of uranium ore, due to the sheer size of the mine. An active shaft with greater activity was established just 230 meters away from the collapsed areas.

== Non-ferrous metal mining ==
In 2005, it was reported that Kimduk Combined Mining Enterprise was the country's largest non-ferrous metal mine. In 2015, according to 38 North, the country expanded the March 5 Youth Mine, a non-ferrous metal mine located 2,500 acres from the Korean-Chinese border.

== Magnesite mines ==
Magnesite in the Tanchon area, a very large resource, has been under extraction since 1980 from the Taehung Youth Hero Mine and the Yongyang Mine, and the former mine is reported to be operating to its full capacity.

Taehung Youth Hero Mine, located in Taehung-dong, Tanchon comprising four mine blocks has been in operation since 1982. It is reported to be the largest magnesite mine in the world. Magnesite ore is found in a strike of 1600 m and has been extracted since 1982. Both open pit and underground mining are done in these mine blocks and there is a total capacity to extract magnesite ore of 600,000 tons per year. In 2006 the production reported was 230,000 tons of magnesite of grade of up to 46.5 percent of MgO.

== Coal mining ==
In addition to its metal resources, North Korea is also abundant in coal and limestone (with 100 billion metric tonnes), valued at some US$9.7 trillion. In particular the purest form of coal, anthracite, is especially abundant, with reserves of over 4.5 billion tonnes, which at $143/tonne would be worth $644.8 billion.

Jiktong coal mine is an anthracite coal mine located in Jiktong, Sunchon where an underground mining operation started in 1997. It has capacity to handle 1 million tons of coal per year. The coal is transported by trucks directly to run the Dongpyeongyang Thermal power plant.

Kogonwol Mine is also an anthracite coal mine located in the Kogŏnwŏl-rodongjagu, Kyongwon County and has been in operation as an underground mine since 1920. It has a capacity of 1 million tons per year and the coal mined is sent by trucks to run the Chongjin Thermal Power Plant and the Chollima Steel Complex.

Jonchon mine is a coal mine located in Jonchon, Chagang Province.

In 2013, North Korea surpassed Vietnam to become the global top exporter of anthracite, generating $1.4 billion in revenue for the DPRK (10% of the country's GDP). Another estimate puts the nation's 2015 coal exports at 19.7 million tonnes, worth $1.1 billion. The regime relies on these profits to procure much of what it needs the most.

Coal exports to China accounted for a major portion of North Korea's revenue in mid-2010s.

== See also ==
- Mining companies of North Korea
