= Taesin station =

Railway station in North Korea

Taesin 대신

Korean name
- Hangul: 대신역
- Hanja: 大新驛
- Revised Romanization: Daesin-yeok
- McCune–Reischauer: Taesin-yŏk

General information
- Location: Taesin-dong, Tanch'ŏn, South Hamgyŏng; North Korea
- Owner: Korean State Railway
- Platforms: 2 (1 island)
- Tracks: 2

History
- Opened: after 1988

Services
Preceding station	Korean State Railway	Following station
Taehŭng towards Muhak	Kumgol Line	Sindŏk towards Yŏhaejin
Location

Taesin station is a railway station in Taesin-dong, greater Tanch'ŏn city, South Hamgyŏng province, North Korea, on the Kŭmgol Line of the Korean State Railway. It was opened sometime after 1988 along with the rest of the Kŭmgol–Muhak section of the line.
