= Suchon station =

Railway station in North Korea

Such'on 수촌

Korean name
- Hangul: 수촌역
- Hanja: 水村驛
- Revised Romanization: Suchon-yeok
- McCune–Reischauer: Such'on-yŏk

General information
- Location: Tanch'ŏn, South Hamgyŏng; North Korea
- Coordinates: 40°41′29″N 128°52′38″E
- Owner: Korean State Railway
- Platforms: 2 (1 island)
- Tracks: 2

History
- Opened: 4 December 1943

Services
Preceding station	Korean State Railway	Following station
Sinp'yŏng towards Muhak	Kumgol Line	Tongam towards Yŏhaejin
Location

Such'on station is a railway station in greater Tanch'ŏn city, South Hamgyŏng province, North Korea, on the Kŭmgol Line of the Korean State Railway. It was opened on 4 December 1943 along with the rest of the Tongam–Paekkŭmsan section of the line.
