= Maebongsan =

Maebongsan (매봉산; 梅峰山) is the name of several mountains in Korea:

- Maebongsan (Yeongwol, Gangwon-do), South Korea
- Maebongsan (Taebaek, Gangwon-do), South Korea
- Maebongsan (Wonju/Yeongwol, Gangwon-do), South Korea
- Maebongsan (Inje, Gangwon-do), South Korea
- Maebongsan (South Hwanghae), mountain of Hwanghaenam-do in North Korea
- Maebongsan (Poptong), mountain of Kangwon-do in North Korea
