= Tongdok station =

Railway station in North Korea

Tongdŏk 동덕

Korean name
- Hangul: 동덕역
- Hanja: 東徳驛
- Revised Romanization: Dongdeok-yeok
- McCune–Reischauer: Tongdŏk-yŏk

General information
- Location: Tanch'ŏn, South Hamgyŏng; North Korea
- Coordinates: 40.6296°N 128.9431°E
- Owner: Korean State Railway

History
- Opened: 30 March 1943

Services
Preceding station	Korean State Railway	Following station
Tongam towards Muhak	Kumgol Line	Unjŏn towards Yŏhaejin
Location

Tongdŏk station is a railway station in greater Tanch'ŏn city, South Hamgyŏng province, North Korea, on the Kŭmgol Line of the Korean State Railway. It was opened on 30 March 1943 along with the rest of the Yŏhaejin–Tongam section of the line. Originally called Hamnam Kwangch'ŏn station (Chosŏn'gŭl: 함남광천역, Hanja: 咸南広泉駅), it received its current name in 1945.
