= Chongok station =

Railway station in North Korea

Ch'ŏn'gok 천곡

Korean name
- Hangul: 천곡역
- Hanja: 泉谷驛
- Revised Romanization: Cheon-gok-yeok
- McCune–Reischauer: Ch'ŏn'gok-yŏk

General information
- Location: Tanch'ŏn, South Hamgyŏng; North Korea
- Coordinates: 40.4813°N 128.9888°E
- Owner: Korean State Railway
- Platforms: 1
- Tracks: 1

History
- Opened: 30 March 1943

Services
Preceding station	Korean State Railway	Following station
Taptong towards Muhak	Kumgol Line	Yŏhaejin Terminus
Location

Ch'ŏn'gok station is a railway halt in greater Tanch'ŏn city, South Hamgyŏng province, North Korea, on the Kŭmgol Line of the Korean State Railway. It was opened on 30 March 1943 along with the rest of the Yŏhaejin–Tongam section of the line.
