= Sindok station =

Railway station in North Korea

Sindŏk 신덕

Korean name
- Hangul: 신덕역
- Hanja: 新德驛
- Revised Romanization: Sindeok-yeok
- McCune–Reischauer: Sindŏk-yŏk

General information
- Location: Sindŏng-ri, Tanch'ŏn, South Hamgyŏng; North Korea
- Coordinates: 40.9625°N 128.8144°E
- Owner: Korean State Railway
- Platforms: 1
- Tracks: 1 (+2 sidings)

History
- Opened: after 1988

Services
Preceding station	Korean State Railway	Following station
Taesin towards Muhak	Kumgol Line	Kŭmgol towards Yŏhaejin
Location

Sindŏk station is a railway station in Sindŏng-ri, greater Tanch'ŏn city, South Hamgyŏng province, North Korea, on the Kŭmgol Line of the Korean State Railway. It was opened sometime after 1988 along with the rest of the Kŭmgol–Muhak section of the line.
