= Tonsan station =

Railway station in North Korea

Tonsan 돈산

Korean name
- Hangul: 돈산역
- Hanja: 돈산驛
- Revised Romanization: Donsan-yeok
- McCune–Reischauer: Tonsan-yŏk

General information
- Location: Tonsal-li, Tanch'ŏn, South Hamgyŏng; North Korea
- Coordinates: 40.8539°N 128.8433°E
- Owner: Korean State Railway
- Platforms: 2 (1 island)
- Tracks: 2

History
- Opened: 4 December 1943

Services
Preceding station	Korean State Railway	Following station
Paekkŭmsan towards Muhak	Kumgol Line	Sinjŭngsan towards Yŏhaejin
Location

Tonsan station is a railway station in Tonsal-li, greater Tanch'ŏn city, South Hamgyŏng province, North Korea, on the Kŭmgol Line of the Korean State Railway. It was opened on 4 December 1943 along with the rest of the Tongam–Paekkŭmsan section of the line; the station was originally called Hamnam Unsong station (Chosōn'gŭl:함남운송역; Hanja: 咸南雲松駅), receiving its current name after the establishment of the DPRK.
