= Taehŭng station =

Railway station in North Korea

Taehŭng 대흥

Korean name
- Hangul: 대흥역
- Hanja: 大興驛
- Revised Romanization: Daeheung-yeok
- McCune–Reischauer: Taehŭng-yŏk

General information
- Location: Taehŭng 1-dong, Tanch'ŏn, South Hamgyŏng; North Korea
- Owner: Korean State Railway
- Platforms: 2 (1 island)
- Tracks: 2

History
- Opened: after 1988

Services
Preceding station	Korean State Railway	Following station
Muhak Terminus	Kumgol Line	Taesin towards Yŏhaejin
Location

Taehŭng station is a railway station in Taehŭng 1-dong, greater Tanch'ŏn city, South Hamgyŏng province, North Korea, on the Kŭmgol Line of the Korean State Railway. It was opened sometime after 1988 along with the rest of the Kŭmgol–Muhak section of the line.
