= Mandok Line =

Railway line in North Korea

Mandŏk Line

Overview
- Native name: 만덕선(滿德線)
- Status: Operational
- Owner: Tanp'ung Railway (1939–1945); Korean State Railway (since 1945)
- Locale: Hŏch'ŏn-gun, South Hamgyŏng
- Termini: Hŏch'ŏn; Mandŏk
- Stations: 3

Service
- Type: Heavy rail, Passenger & freight rail Regional rail

History
- Opened: 1939

Technical
- Line length: 10.3 km (6.4 mi)
- Number of tracks: Single track
- Track gauge: 1,435 mm (4 ft 8 1/2 in) standard gauge
- Electrification: 3000 V DC Overhead line
Route map
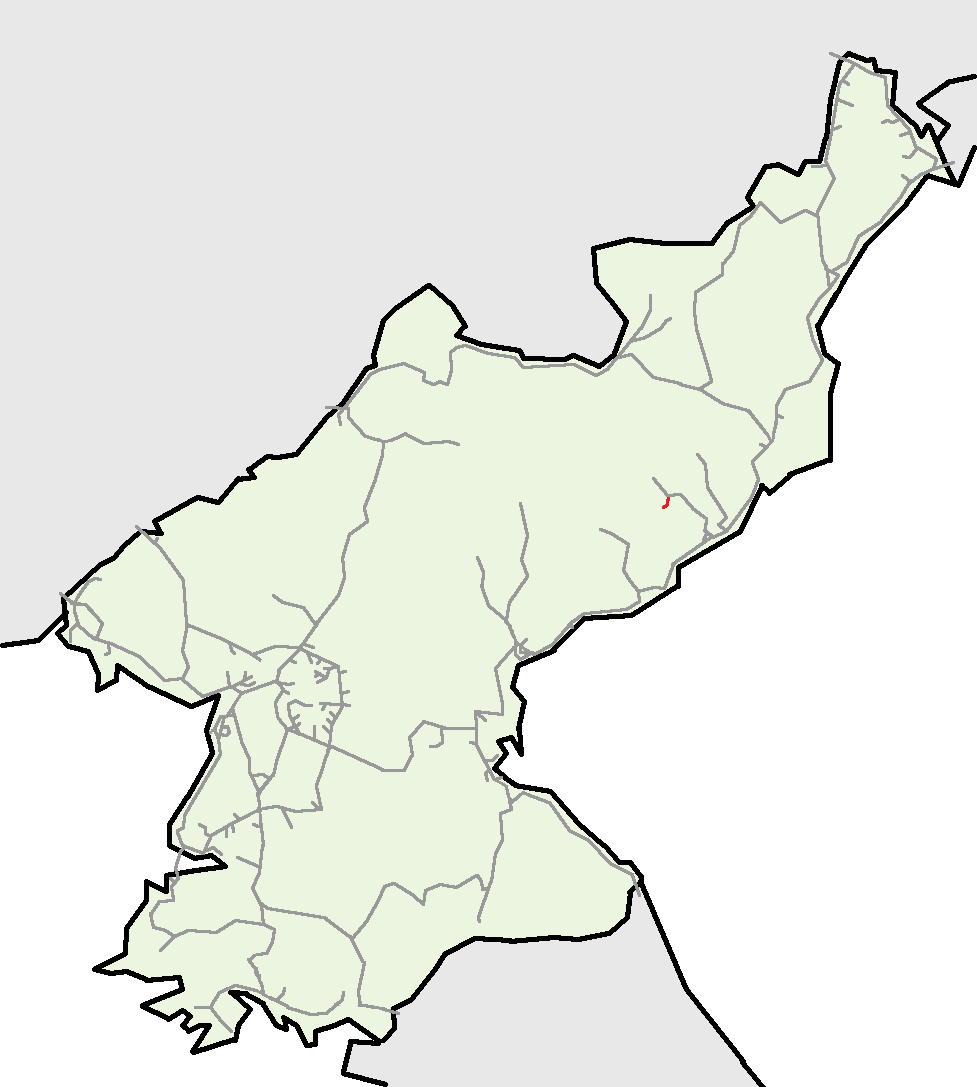

- Mandok Line
- Hangul: 만덕선
- Hanja: 滿德線
- RR: Mandeokseon
- MR: Mandŏksŏn

The Mandŏk Line is an electrified standard-gauge secondary line of the Korean State Railway in Hŏch'ŏn County, South Hamgyŏng Province, North Korea running from Hŏch'ŏn on the Hŏch'ŏn Line to Mandŏk.

== History ==
This line was opened by the privately owned Tanp'ung Railway as a branch of its Tanchon−Honggun mainline opened on 26 August 1939.

== Services ==
A pair of local passenger trains 931/932 are known to operate on this line between Hŏch'ŏn and Mandŏk.

== Route ==
A yellow background in the "Distance" box indicates that section of the line is not electrified.

Distance (km)		Station Name		Former Name		
Total	S2S	Transcribed	Chosŏn'gŭl (Hanja)	Transcribed	Chosŏn'gŭl (Hanja)	Connections
0.0	0.0	Hŏch'ŏn	허천 (虛川)	Kosŏng	고성 (古城)	Hŏch'ŏn Line
6.6	6.6	Pudong	부동 (釜洞)			
10.3	3.7	Mandŏk	만덕 (滿德)			
