= Energy in Korea =

Energy in Korea may refer to:

- Energy in North Korea
- Energy in South Korea

== See also ==
- Energy in Asia
