= 勝利 =

勝利, 胜利 or 승리, meaning 'victory', may refer to:

- Seungri (born 1990), South Korean singer-songwriter
- Shengli Oil Field, Chinese oil field
- Shori Sato (born 1996), Japanese idol
- Uncle Victory, 2013 Chinese film starring Huang Haibo and Zhang Xinyi
- Victor, Taiwanese manufacturer of sporting equipment
- Wu Shengli (born 1945), Chinese admiral

== See also ==
- Seungri (disambiguation)
- Shori
- Victor (disambiguation)
- Victory (disambiguation)
