= Komdok mine =

Lead and zinc mine in North Korea

Coordinates: 40.926°N 128.816°E

- Interactive map of Komdok mine
- Location: Tanchon, South Hamgyong Province, North Korea
- Products: Lead, Zinc

The Komdok mine(검덕광업연합기업소) is one of the largest lead and zinc mines in North Korea and in the world. The mine is located in Kumgol-dong, Tanchon. The mine has estimated reserves of 266 million tonnes of ore 0.88% lead and 4.21% zinc.

Following the damages caused by Typhoon Maysak, Kim Jong-un directed for the Komdok region to be transformed into a 'model mountainous city and a mining city' as a part of the 80 day campaign for the 8th Congress of the Workers' Party of Korea.

A trolleybus line formerly existed to serve this region running from Kumgol-1 dong to Kumgol-3 dong. It was opened in 1986 and served by three trolleybuses until they were removed by 2011. The southern loop at Kumgol station was removed around or before 2015.
