= Kumya County =

Coordinates: 39.545°N 127.240°E

Kumya County 금야군
- County

Korean transcription(s)
  - Chosŏn'gŭl: 금야군
  - Hancha: 金野郡
  - McCune-Reischauer: Kŭmya kun
  - Revised Romanization: Geumya-gun
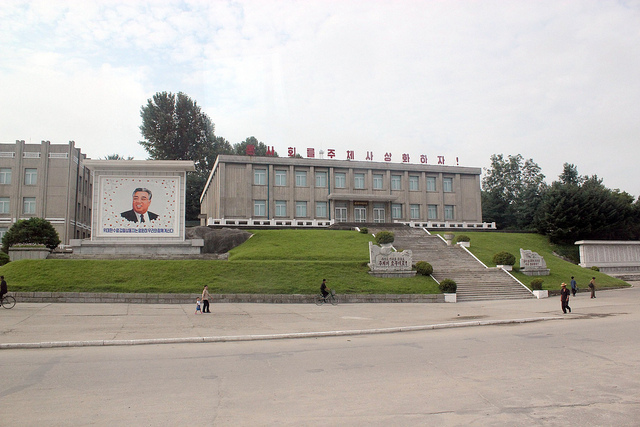
- Kŭmya-ŭp, Kŭmya County

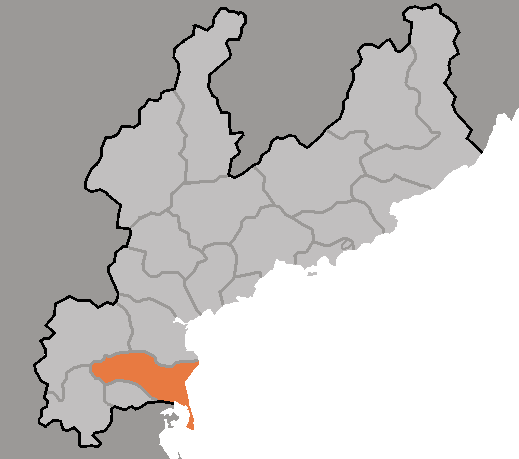
- Map of South Hamgyong showing the location of Kumya
- Country: North Korea
- Province: South Hamgyong Province
- Administrative divisions: 1 ŭp, 4 workers' districts, 50 ri

Area
  - Total: 798.6 km^{2} (308.3 sq mi)

Population (2008)
  - Total: 211,140
  - Density: 264.4/km^{2} (684.8/sq mi)

Kŭmya County is a county in South Hamgyŏng province, North Korea. It borders the Sea of Japan (East Sea of Korea) to the east.

== History ==
The area was settled at least since the Bronze Age, revealed by excavations of relics in the county. During the Three Kingdoms era, the area became controlled by Goguryeo, then taken over by Balhae. Eventually, it became a domain of Goryeo and renamed Hwaju. When the Joseon dynasty came to power, it was renamed to Yonghung, due to belief that this was the hometown of the maternal grandmother of Taejo of Joseon.

In January 1974, when Inhung-gun (Inhung County) was abolished, much of its ri (villages) were transferred to Yonghung-gun, along with Inhung-up, which was downgraded to a rodongjagu, in total placing 1 up, 3 rodongjagu and 48 ri under its jurisdiction.

In March 1977, Yonghung-gun was renamed to Kumya-gun and a number of villages and Yonghung-up were renamed.

== Administrative divisions ==
Kŭmya county is divided into 1 ŭp (town), 4 rodongjagu (workers' districts) and 50 ri (villages):

- Kŭmya-ŭp
- Inhŭng-rodongjagu
- Kajil-lodongjagu
- Kaljŏl-lodongjagu
- Kwangmyŏngsŏng-rodongjagu
- Andong-ri
- Chaktong-ri
- Chiil-li
- Chinhŭng-ri
- Chinsu-ri
- Chŏngdong-ri
- Chungdong-ri
- Chungnam-ri
- Ch'ŏngbaeng-ri
- Ponghŭng-ri
- Pongsal-li
- P'ungnam-ri
- P'ungsŏng-ri
- P'yŏnghwa-ri
- Ryangt'al-li
- Ryŏndong-ri
- Ryong'am-ri
- Ryongch'ŏl-li
- Ryongnam-li
- Ryongsal-li
- Ryongsang-ri
- Ryongwŏl-li
- Saedong-ri
- Ch'ŏngdong-ri
- Haejung-ri
- Hodo-ri
- Hŭngp'yŏng-ri
- Kinjae-ri
- Kŭmp'ung-ri
- Kŭmsa-ri
- Kuryong-ri
- Kwangdŏng-ri
- Munha-ri
- Onjŏng-ri
- Paeksal-li
- Pidal-li
- Pŏmp'o-ri
- Sahyŏl-li
- Sambong-ri
- Sangdong-ri
- Sindang-ri
- Sinsŏng-ri
- Solbat-ri
- Songjae-ri
- Sŏngjae-ri
- Suwŏl-li
- Taeŭng-ri
- Tŏksal-li
- Tonghŭng-ri
- Yŏngp'ung-ri

== Economy ==
=== Agriculture and fishery ===
The chief form of agriculture in the county is rice cultivation. In addition, maize, soybeans, and wheat are produced; there are also orchards. There are no ports, although some fishing is done along the coast with the main fishery bases at Kwangmyongsong-rodongjagu, Andong-ri, Hodo-ri and Chongbaeng-ri. An aquaculture business at Kwangmyogsong-rodongjagu produces seaweed, kelp and oysters. Similar businesses exist in Chinhung-ri and Andong-ri. Various fruits, vegetables and meat are produced in the county.

=== Mining and manufacturing ===
Machine industry has been well-developed in the region. There are also mines exploiting the local deposits of lignite, graphite, and gold. The Kumya youth coal mine, a major coal mine. The lignite produced at this mine is supplied to South Hamgyong and Kangwon Province.

The manufacturing industry in the county produces products used in agriculture and construction, with a prominent production of tractor accessories and trailers.

Other products manufactured in the county include bricks, textiles, cloth and roofing.

=== Electricity generation ===
The Kumyagang Power Station No.2 is located in the county. It was ceremoniously opened on 30 October 2020, built in a series of many small scale hydropower plants in North Korea, although it was built on the initiative of the county, which Kim Jong-un praised, and in return, decided to send generators and transformers, which had not yet been installed. The completed power station will supply power to the farming co-ops and industries in the area. As Kumyagang Power Station No.2 can also draw water from the larger Kumyagang Army-People Power Station, it guarantees a stable generation even in the dry season. The total installed capacity is 7.5 MW, from 3 generators of 2.5 MW each manufactured by Ryongsong Machine Complex.

The Kumyagang Army-People Power Station was inaugurated on August 3, 2016, after a 14-year build time. It was reported to be near completion in 2010, while construction began in 2003.

== Transport ==
The county is served by rail and road. Kŭmya Youth Station is on the P'yongra Line of the Korean State Railway. The road system is well-developed, thanks to the level terrain.

== Environment ==
To the west, there are high mountains but the eastern portion of the county is flat. The majority of the county are mountains, with only 19.6% of the area being below 500 metres elevation. The highest peak is Chŏngamsan (정암산). The chief river is the Ryonghŭng with around 50 rivers flowing through the county in total. Several islands are situated around the Songjŏn Bay (송전만). Forestland makes up about 89% of the county's area.

The north of the county is the Bujongmyon mountain range, in the east, the Taedok mountain range and in the south and in the west, the Geobong mountain range.

The county has extensive underground resources, such as copper, gold, zinc, iron, graphite and asbestos.

The Kumya River estuary Important Bird Area and Kumya Bay Important Bird Area are in the county.

== See also ==
- Geography of North Korea
- Administrative divisions of North Korea
