= Paekkumsan station =

Railway station in North Korea

Paekkŭmsan 백금산

Korean name
- Hangul: 백금산역
- Hanja: 白金山驛
- Revised Romanization: Baekgeumsan-yeok
- McCune–Reischauer: Paekkŭmsan-yŏk

General information
- Location: Paekkŭmsan-dong, Tanch'ŏn, South Hamgyŏng; North Korea
- Coordinates: 40.8904°N 128.8209°E
- Owner: Korean State Railway
- Platforms: 1
- Tracks: 7 (+3 sidings)

History
- Opened: 4 December 1943

Services
Preceding station	Korean State Railway	Following station
Kŭmgol towards Muhak	Kumgol Line	Tonsan towards Yŏhaejin
Location

Paekkŭmsan station is a railway station in Paekkŭmsan-dong, greater Tanch'ŏn city, South Hamgyŏng province, North Korea, on the Kŭmgol Line of the Korean State Railway. It was opened on 4 December 1943 along with the rest of the Tongam–Paekkŭmsan section of the line; the station was originally called Yongyang station (Chosōn'gŭl:용양역; Hanja: 龍陽駅), receiving its current name after the establishment of the DPRK.
