= Seungri (disambiguation) =

Seungri (승리; "Victory"), is a South Korean singer-songwriter and actor

Seungri (승리; "Victory") may also refer to:

- Sungri Motor Plant, North Korean factory
- Sungni Station, station on the Pyongyang Metro
- Sŭngri Station, station in Rason City
- Sŭngri Refinery, located in the Special Economic Zone of Rason City in North Korea's northeast, with a refining capacity of 2 million tons

People with the given name Seung-ri include:

- Ha Seung-ri (born 1995), South Korean actress
- Lee Seung-ri (born 2000), birth name of Nancy Jewel McDonie or simply Nancy, member of Momoland
