= Nuclear power in North Korea =

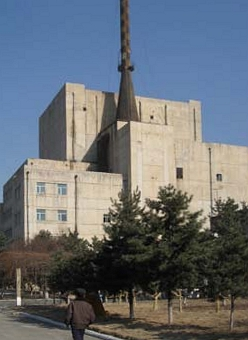
The 5 MWe experimental reactor built at Yongbyon in the period 1980–1985.

North Korea (DPRK) has been active in developing nuclear technology since the 1950s.

Although the country currently has no operational power-generating nuclear reactor, efforts at developing its nuclear power sector continue. Moreover, North Korea has developed nuclear weapons. It conducted what are widely accepted to have been nuclear tests in 2006, 2009, 2013, 2016, and 2017.

== History ==
=== Early developments (1950s–1960s) ===
Since the 1950s, North Korea has been interested in nuclear technology and has pursued the use of nuclear technology by transferring knowledge and technology related to nuclear energy from the Soviet Union. In April 1955, it decided to establish the Atomic and Nuclear Physics Research Institute at the 2nd General Meeting of the North Korean Academy of Sciences and dispatched six scientists from the Soviet Union Academy to the conference held in the Soviet Union in June 1955. In September 1959, an agreement on the use of nuclear power was signed with the Soviet Union in Moscow, and the dispatch of a scientist from North Korea to the Soviet Union became a systematic step forward.

An IRT-2000 pool-type research reactor was supplied by the Soviet Union for the Yongbyon Nuclear Scientific Research Center in 1963, and began operation in 1965. After upgrades to the research reactor, the fuels now used are IRT-2M-type assemblies of 36% and 80% highly enriched uranium. As the center has not received fresh fuel since Soviet times, this reactor is now only run occasionally to produce iodine-131 for thyroid cancer radiation therapy.

According to a 2022 study of Donghyun Woo, who relied on previously unexamined North Korean publications and Soviet archival materials, North Korea's early nuclear developments were motivated out of a desire to harness nuclear power for economic reasons rather than develop nuclear weapons for security reasons.

=== Expansion of the program (1970s–1990s) ===
During the 1970s the North Korean research became more independent. In 1974 North Korea upgraded its Soviet-supplied reactor to 8 MW, and in 1979 it began to build a second, indigenous research reactor in Yongbyon Nuclear Scientific Research Center. Parallel to the construction of this reactor an ore processing plant and a fuel rod fabrication plant were built.

During the 1980s, the North Korean government realized that light-water reactors (LWRs) were better suited to producing large amounts of electricity, for which there was a growing requirement.

After the demise of the Soviet Union in 1991, Russia continued site selection fieldwork for the Sinpo LWR project. However, the North Koreans refused to pay for the work, and the project was effectively discontinued.

==== Institute of Atomic Energy ====
The Institute of Atomic Energy (IAE) in Pyongyang was founded in 1985, initially to house a 20 MeV cyclotron and laboratories imported under an IAEA technical cooperation program from the Soviet Union. The vast majority of cyclotron usage is to produce gallium-66 for liver and breast cancer treatment. The IAE has grown and now has three purposes: research, applying atomic energy to medicine and industry, and providing experimental facilities for nuclear studies students, particularly from Kim Il Sung University and Kim Chaek University of Technology.

=== Denuclearization pledges ===
In 1994, North Korea signed the U.S.-North Korea Agreed Framework with the United States. North Korea thereby agreed to end its graphite-moderated nuclear reactor program, including the construction of a 200 MWe power reactor at Taechon, in exchange for the construction of two 1000-MWe light-water reactors at Kumho, to be known as the Sinpo Nuclear Power Plant. Construction of these was started in 2000 by the Korean Peninsula Energy Development Organization, but was suspended in November 2003. Under the Six-Party Talks held on 19 September 2005, North Korea pledged to end all its nuclear programs and return to the Nuclear Non-Proliferation Treaty, submitting to international inspections in return for benefits including energy aid and normalization of relations with Japan and the United States.

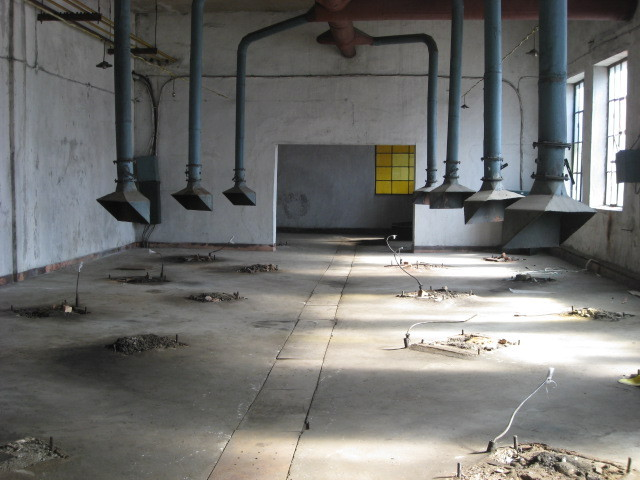
An empty machine shop in the then-disabled fuel fabrication facility at Yongbyon in 2008.

On 25 June 2008, it was announced that North Korea was to end its nuclear program; its nuclear declaration was to be handed over to China in Beijing on 26 June 2008. The nuclear devices that North Korea already had, however, were to be handed over at a later date. Earlier, on 23 June, North Korea stated that it had begun to dismantle its nuclear program and declared that it would turn over all of its plans to the international community.

In 2009, Siegfried Hecker, the co-director of the Stanford University Center for International Security and Cooperation, said that "prior to its April rocket launch, North Korea had discharged approximately 6,100 of the 8,000 fuel rods from its 5-megawatt reactor to the cooling pool, but disablement slowed to a crawl of 15 fuel rods per week, dragging out the projected completion of fuel unloading well into 2011. "

Despite these apparent shutdown efforts, North Korea's nuclear tests in 2006, 2009 and 2013 have called into question its denuclearization commitment. In April 2013, amid rising tensions with the West, North Korea stated that it would restart the mothballed Yongbyon facility and resume production of weapons-grade plutonium.

On 7 July 2018, U.S. Secretary of State Mike Pompeo, Japanese Foreign Minister Taro Kono and South Korean Foreign Minister Kang Kyung-wha met in Tokyo where they reaffirmed their unity in urging North Korea to denuclearize as promised. The ministers stressed the need to call on North Korea to take concrete steps toward denuclearization and to keep existing U.N. economic sanctions in place.

=== Nuclear fusion claims ===
In May 2010, North Korea's state newspaper, Rodong Sinmun, announced in an article that North Korea had successfully carried out a nuclear fusion reaction. The aforementioned article, referring to the alleged test as "a great event that demonstrated the rapidly developing cutting-edge science and technology of the DPRK", also made mention of efforts by North Korean scientists to develop "safe and environment-friendly new energy", and made no mention of plans to use fusion technology in its nuclear weapons program.

=== Indigenous light water reactor development ===
In 2009 North Korea announced its intention to build an indigenous experimental light water reactor (LWR) and the uranium enrichment technology to provide its nuclear fuel. In November 2010, a group of non-governmental U.S. experts reported that they had visited North Korea's Yongbyon Nuclear Scientific Research Center, where they were shown an experimental 25–30 MWe light water reactor in the early stages of construction, and a 2,000-gas centrifuge uranium enrichment plant, which was said to be producing low enriched uranium (LEU) fuel for the reactor. Construction of the uranium enrichment plant reportedly began in April 2009, and the initial target date for operational commencement for the reactor was 2012. In November 2011, satellite imagery indicated that the LWR construction was progressing rapidly, with the concrete structures largely completed. The LWR is being built on the site of the demolished cooling tower of the experimental Magnox reactor.

Following the building of this experimental LWR, North Korea intends to build larger LWRs for electricity generation. Initial estimates were that the reactor would be put into operation in 2013, but the reactor was not externally complete until 2016. In 2017, several activities were noted involving construction, a dam was built to provide sufficient amount of water for the cooling system, switchyard and connections to transmission line were made along with facilities presumably used for maintenance and repair. In 2018 the preliminary testing of the reactor started.

As of May 2024, intermittent cooling water flows indicate pre-operational tests are probably being conducted.

== Nuclear weapons program ==
Following the 1958 U.S. deployment of tactical nuclear weapons in South Korea, the North Korean government asked both the Soviet Union and China for help in developing nuclear weapons, but was refused by both. However, the Soviet Union agreed to help North Korea develop a peaceful nuclear energy program, including the training of nuclear scientists.

Eventually this technology base developed into a clandestine nuclear weapons program, leading to the 2006 and 2009 nuclear tests. In 2009, it was estimated that North Korea had up to ten functional nuclear warheads. After the death of Kim Jong Il in December 2011, the IAEA announced its readiness to return nuclear inspectors to North Korea, from which they were expelled in 2009, as soon as an agreement could be reached on steps towards denuclearization. Nonetheless, in early 2013, North Korea pledged to conduct more nuclear tests in the near future, and its third nuclear test took place in February 2013.

=== Key nuclear organizations ===
The North Korean Institute of Physics was founded in 1952. The various departments originally created within the Institute of Physics later served as the basis for several independent research centers, including the Institute of Atomic Physics, the Institute of Semiconductors and the Institute of Mathematics.

A further reorganization of scientific research activities was carried out in the 1970s, during which the majority of North Korea's nuclear research institutes were transferred from Pyongyang to the city of Pyonsong, 50 kilometres (31 mi) from the capital, and combined into a single scientific center.

== See also ==
- Energy in North Korea
- Nuclear proliferation
- Nuclear power in South Korea
