= Hochon Line =

Secondary line of the Korean State Railway

Hŏch'ŏn Line

Overview
- Status: Operational
- Owner: Tanp'ung Railway (1939–1945); Korean State Railway (since 1945)
- Locale: South Hamgyŏng
- Termini: Tanch'ŏn Ch'ŏngnyŏn; Honggun
- Stations: 12

Service
- Type: Heavy rail, Regional rail

History
- Opened: 26 Aug. 1939

Technical
- Line length: 80.3 km (49.9 mi)
- Number of tracks: Single track
- Track gauge: 1,435 mm (4 ft 8 1/2 in) standard gauge
- Electrification: 3000 V DC Catenary (Tanch'ŏn Ch'ŏngnyŏn – Hŏch'ŏn)
Route map
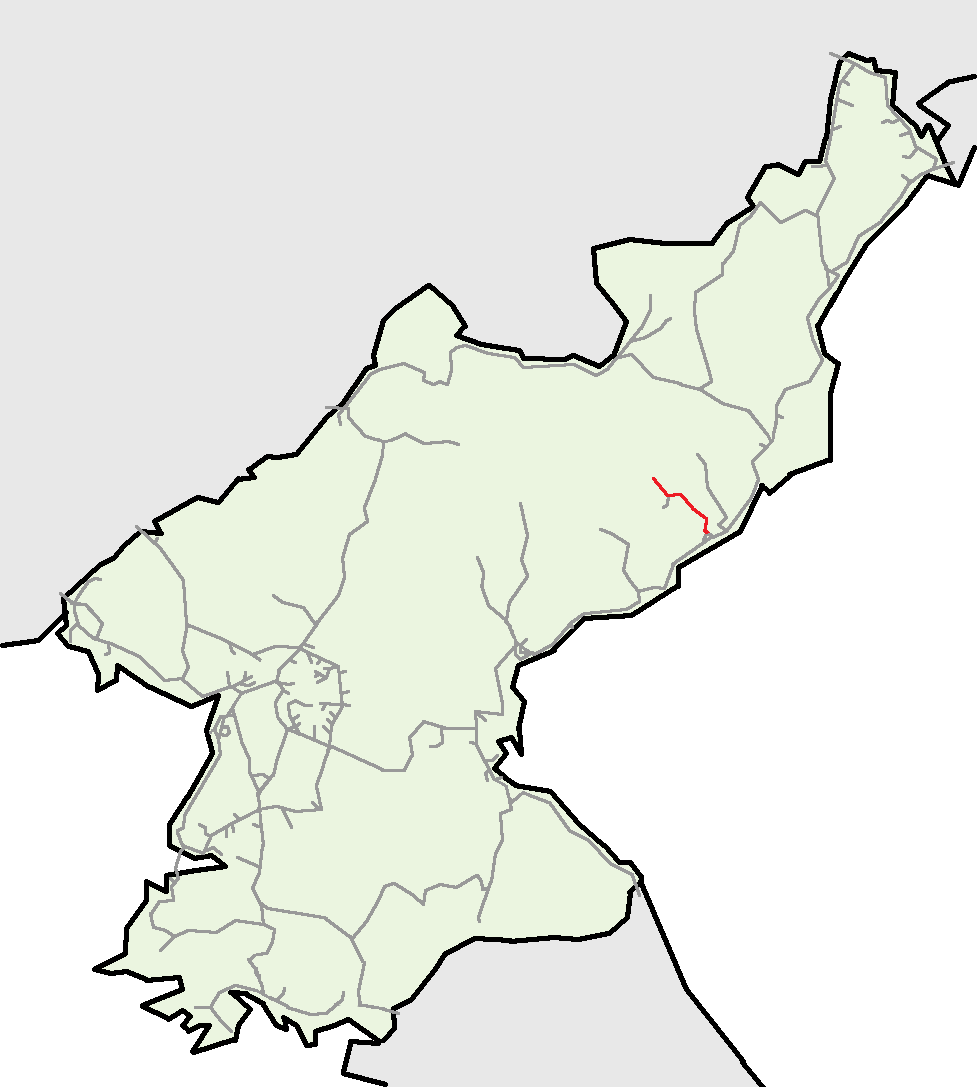

- Hochon Line
- Hangul: 허천선
- Hanja: 虛川線
- RR: Heocheonseon
- MR: Hŏch'ŏnsŏn

The Hŏch'ŏn Line is a partially electrified standard-gauge secondary line of the Korean State Railway running from Tanch'ŏn on the P'yŏngra Line to Honggun.

== History ==
The privately owned Tanp'ung Railway was formed to build a railway from Tanch'ŏn on the Hamgyŏng Line of the Chosen Government Railway to P'ungsan, the county seat of P'ungsan County; it was from the first characters of the names of the endpoints that the railway, and the mainline, got its name. The initial section of the mainline, 80.3 km (49.9 mi) from Tanch'ŏn to Honggun, was opened on 26 August 1939. A branchline, the Mandŏk Line, from Kosŏng (now called Hŏch'ŏn) to Mandŏk was also opened, but the planned continuation from Honggun to P'ungsan was not completed before the fall of Japan at the end of the Pacific War.

Following the partition of Korea, the entirety of the Tanp'ung Railway's network was located in the Soviet zone of occupation. The Provisional People’s Committee for North Korea nationalised all railways in the northern half of the country on 10 August 1946, and following the establishment of North Korea, the Korean State Railway was created. Damage sustained by the line during the Korean War was repaired and the line was eventually electrified, but the extension to P'ungsan (renamed Kimhyŏnggwŏn in 1990) was never built.

== Services ==
Two pairs of passenger trains are known to run on this line:

- Local trains 551/556, operating from Kokku to Tongdae, run on this line on the segment between Tanch'ŏn Ch'ŏngnyŏn and Tongdae;
- Local trains 925/926 operate on this line between Tanch'ŏn Ch'ŏngnyŏn and Honggun.

== Route ==
A yellow background in the "Distance" box indicates that section of the line is not electrified.

Distance (km)		Station Name		Former Name		
Total	S2S	Transcribed	Chosŏn'gŭl (Hanja)	Transcribed	Chosŏn'gŭl (Hanja)	Connections
0.0	0.0	Tanch'ŏn Ch'ŏngnyŏn	단천청년 (端川靑年)	Tanch'ŏn	단천 (端川)	P'yŏngra Line
7.0	7.0	Tongdae	동대 (東坮)			
~~10.1~~	~~3.1~~	Changdŏk	장덕			Closed.
21.1	14.1	Haunsŭng	하운승 (下雲承)			
32.6	11.5	Sangnong	상농 (上農)			
39.3	6.7	Chungch'on	중촌 (中村)			
43.5	4.2	Nongch'on	농촌 (農村)			
49.7	6.2	Ch'udong	추동 (楸洞)			
54.7	5.0	Hŏch'ŏn	허천 (虚川)	Kosŏng	고성 (古城)	Mandŏk Line
60.9	6.2	Suŭi	수의 (守義)			
67.1	6.2	Changp'a	장파 (長坡)			
71.3	4.2	Pochi'ri	보치리 (浦淄里)			Flag stop.
78.9	7.6	Hahonggun	하홍군 (下洪君)			
80.3	1.4	Honggun	홍군 (洪君)			
