= Sungri station =

Railway station in Rason, North Korea

Sŭngri 승리

Korean name
- Hangul: 승리역
- Hanja: 勝利驛
- Revised Romanization: Seungni-yeok
- McCune–Reischauer: Sŭngni-yŏk

General information
- Location: Sŏnbong, Rasŏn T'ŭkpyŏlsi, North Hamgyŏng; North Korea
- Owner: Korean State Railway
- Line: Hambuk Line

Services
Preceding station	Korean State Railway	Following station
Terminus	Sŭngri Line	Sŏnbong Terminus
Location

Sŭngri station is a railway station in Sŏnbong county, Rason Special City, North Hamgyŏng province, North Korea. It is the terminus of the Sŭngri Line from Sŏnbong on the Hambuk Line of the Korean State Railway, serving the large Sŭngri Petrochemical Complex.
