= Hochon County =

Hochon County 허천군
- County

Korean transcription(s)
  - Hanja: 虛川郡
  - McCune-Reischauer: Hŏch'ŏn kun
  - Revised Romanization: Heocheon-gun
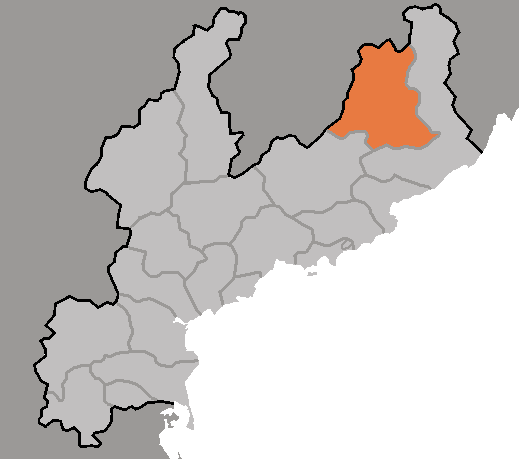
- Map of South Hamgyong showing the location of Hochon
- Coordinates: 40°45′57″N 128°33′15″E
- Country: North Korea
- Province: South Hamgyong Province
- Administrative divisions: 1 ŭp, 5 workers' districts, 17 ri

Area
  - Total: 1,684 km^{2} (650 sq mi)

Population (2008)
  - Total: 104,731
  - Density: 62.19/km^{2} (161.1/sq mi)

Hŏch'ŏn is a county in South Hamgyŏng province, North Korea. It was created after the division of Korea, from portions of Tanchon and P'ungsan (now Kimhyonggwon County).

== Geography ==
Most of the county is steep and mountainous, particularly in the southeast. There are numerous high peaks. The Hamgyong Mountains and Geomdok Mountains (Korean: 검덕산맥) pass through the county with the highest peak at Mount Geomdok.

The chief stream is the Namdaecheon (Korean: 남대천). Approximately 90% of the county is forestland.

== Administrative divisions ==
Hŏch'ŏn county is divided into 1 ŭp (town), 5 rodongjagu (workers' districts) and 17 ri (villages):

- Hŏch'ŏn-ŭp
- Mandŏng-rodongjagu
- Ryongwŏl-lodongjagu
- Sangnong-rodongjagu
- Sangsal-lodongjagu
- Sinhŭng-rodongjagu
- Changp'yŏng-ri
- Chungp'yŏng-ri
- Ha'nong-ri
- Hwachang-ri
- Hwan'gong-ri
- Hwangmyŏng-ri
- Kŭmch'ang-ri
- Sangnam-ri
- Sat'ap-ri
- Sinp'yŏng-ri
- Suŭi-ri
- Tonghŭng-ri
- Ŭnhŭng-ri
- Unsŭng-ri
- Ŭr'am-ri
- Wap'o-ri
- Yangŭmp'yŏng-ri

== Economy ==
Mining and electrical power are the chief local industries. There are deposits of copper, iron ore, lead, and zinc. Local crops include maize, soybeans, and potatoes, but cultivation is difficult due to the mountainous terrain.

Sangnong mine is located in this county, to the west of Sangnong-rodongjagu.

== Transportation ==
Hŏch'ŏn county is served by the Hŏch'ŏn and Mandŏk lines of the Korean State Railway, and by various roads.

Near Sangnong-rodongjagu, there is a trolleybus line to Sangnong mine served by one vehicle, though there were two vehicles in 2002. However, in more recent satellite imagery from 2020, the only trolleybus visible has disappeared.

== Military ==
The Sangnam-ri Ballistic Missile Base is located in the county. According to the Center for Strategic and International Studies, the existence of the base first came to public light in 1999, although construction began ca. 1994. Primary construction of barracks, underground facilities, bunkers, and other support structures was completed by the mid-2000s. Sangnam-ri is a battalion- or regiment-sized unit that encompasses approximately 3.85 sq. km of mountainous territory. It is operated by the Korean People's Army Strategic Force and is equipped with Hwasong-10 (Musudan) intermediate-range ballistic missiles.

== See also ==
- Geography of North Korea
- Administrative divisions of North Korea
- South Hamgyong
