= Sungri Line =

Railway line in North Korea

Sŭngri Line

Overview
- Native name: 승리선(勝利線)
- Status: Operational
- Owner: Korean State Railway
- Locale: Rasŏn
- Termini: Sŏnbong; Sŭngri
- Stations: 2

Service
- Type: Freight rail
- Operator: Korean State Railway

Technical
- Line length: 4.2 km (2.6 mi)
- Number of tracks: Single track
- Track gauge: 1,435 mm (4 ft 8 1/2 in) standard gauge

- Sungri Line
- Hangul: 승리선
- Hanja: 勝利線
- RR: Seungniseon
- MR: Sŭngnisŏn

The Sŭngri Line is a non-electrified 4.2 km (2.6 mi) long railway line of the Korean State Railway in North Korea, connecting Sŏnbong on the Hambuk Line with the industrial area at Sŭngri.

The line serves the large Sŭngri Petrochemical Complex in Sŭngri.

== Route ==
A yellow background in the "Distance" box indicates that section of the line is not electrified.

Distance (km)		Station Name		Former Name		
Total	S2S	Transcribed	Chosŏn'gŭl (Hanja)	Transcribed	Chosŏn'gŭl (Hanja)	Connections
0.0	0.0	Sŏnbong	선봉 (先鋒)	Unggi	웅기 (雄基)	Hambuk Line
4.2	4.2	Sŭngri	승리 (勝利)			
