= Kumho, South Hamgyong =

Area of South Hamgyong, North Korea

Kumho
- chigu (area) of North Korea

Korean transcription(s)
  - Hangul: 금호지구
  - Hanja: 琴湖地區
  - Revised Romanization: Geumho-jigu
  - McCune–Reischauer: Kŭmho-jigu
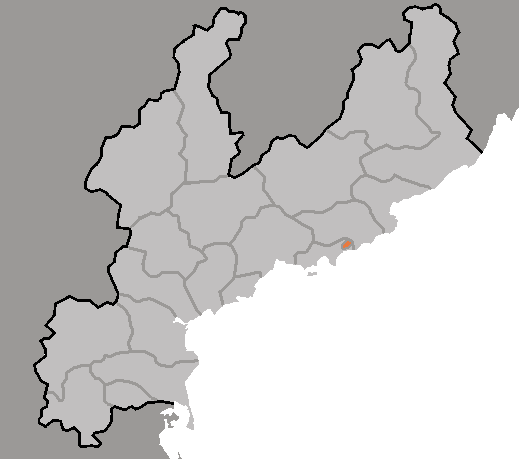
- Map of South Hamgyong showing the location of Kumho
- Coordinates: 40°05′42″N 128°20′28″E
- Country: North Korea
- Province: South Hamgyong

Area
  - Total: 104 km^{2} (40 sq mi)

Population (2008)
  - Total: 37,430
  - Density: 360/km^{2} (932/sq mi)

Kŭmho is a chigu, or area, in South Hamgyŏng province, near the city of Sinp'o, North Korea. Kŭmho was part of Sinp'o until 1995, when it was made a special area under the direct administration of the province.

In Kŭmho near Sinp'o in 1987 the building of first national nuclear plant was started by USSR but construction was cancelled in 1991 due to lack of funding and in 1993 then according to political reasons.

Then this place was the site of a planned two reactors development which was to have been built by the Korean Peninsula Energy Development Organization (KEDO) with international support. Preparations and construction began in 1994 and 1997, but reactors was never completed. The last international workers were removed from the area in January 2006.

== Administrative divisions ==
Kŭmho is divided into 1 rodongjagu (workers' district) and 8 ri (villages):

- Kangsang-rodongjagu
- Homanp'o-ri
- Honam-ri
- Kŭmho-ri
- Kwangch'ŏl-li
- Namhŭng-ri
- Omae-ri
- Sŏhŭng-ri
- Sokhu-ri

== See also ==
- Administrative divisions of North Korea
- Geography of North Korea
