= Kumya River estuary Important Bird Area =

Nature reserve in North Korea

Coordinates: 39°49′00″N 127°30′00″E

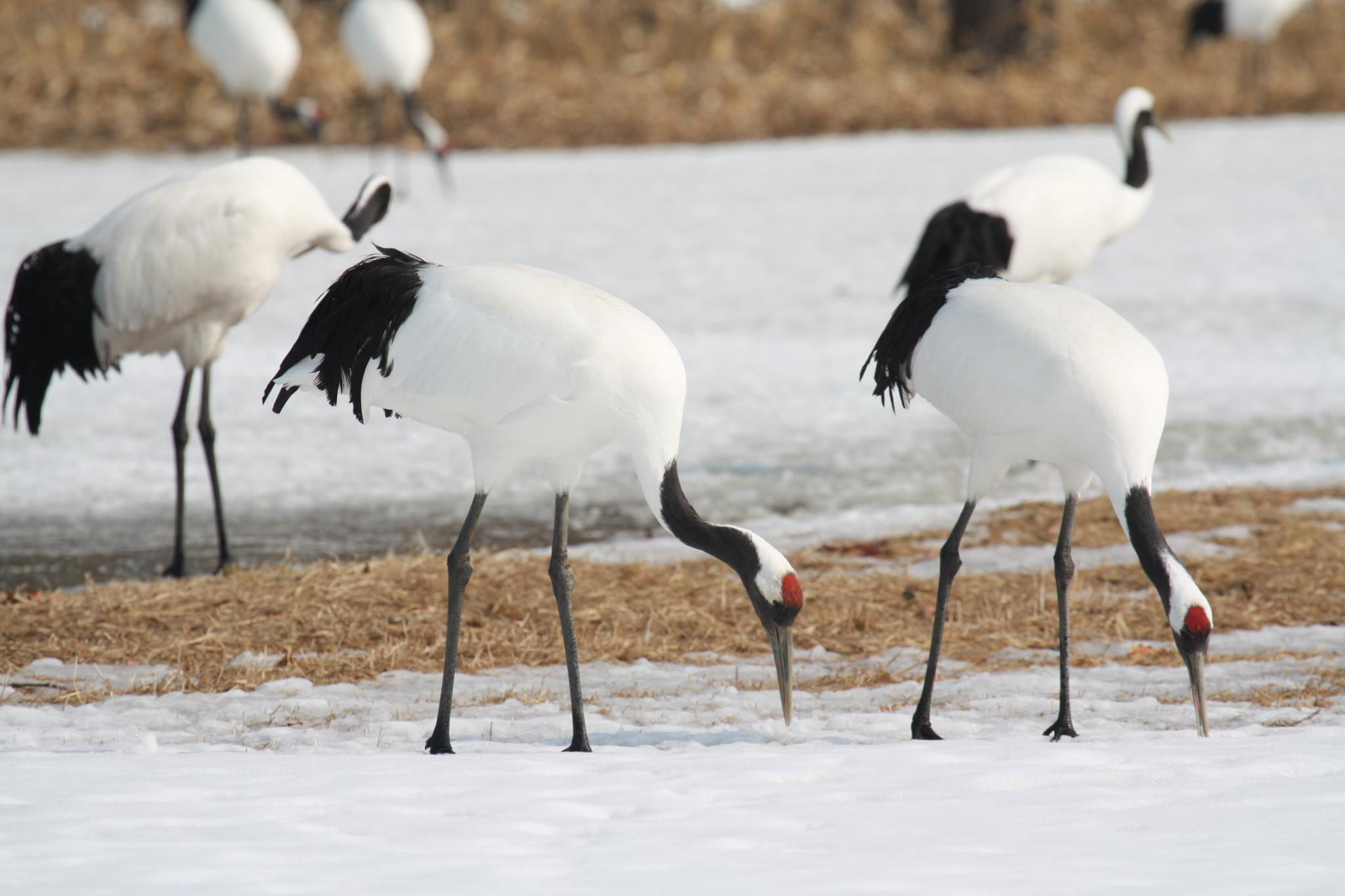
The estuary is an important wintering site for red-crowned cranes

The Ryonghung Gang estuary Important Bird Area comprises the 10,000 ha estuary of the Ryonghung River where it flows into the Sea of Japan in South Hamgyong Province on the eastern coast of North Korea. The site contains both estuarine waters and rice paddies. It has been identified by BirdLife International as an Important Bird Area (IBA) because it supports an overwintering population of red-crowned cranes.
