= Sangnong mine =

Coordinates: 40.600°N 128.725°E

- Interactive map of Sangnong mine
- Location: Hochon County, South Hamgyong Province, North Korea
- Products: Gold

The Sangnong mine (Korean: 상농광산) is one of the largest gold mines in North Korea and in the world. The mine is located in the center of the country in South Hamgyong Province. The mine has estimated reserves of 6.4 million oz of gold. The mine also has reserves amounting to 200 million tonnes of ore grading 0.23% copper metal.

A trolleybus line opened in 1993, linking the mine to Sangnong-rodongjagu. It had two trolleybuses in the early 2000s, but only one later and none in 2020.
