= Yonggwang County =

Yŏnggwang County 영광군
- County

Korean transcription(s)
  - Hanja: 榮光郡
  - McCune–Reischauer: Yŏnggwang-gun
  - Revised Romanization: Yeonggwang-gun
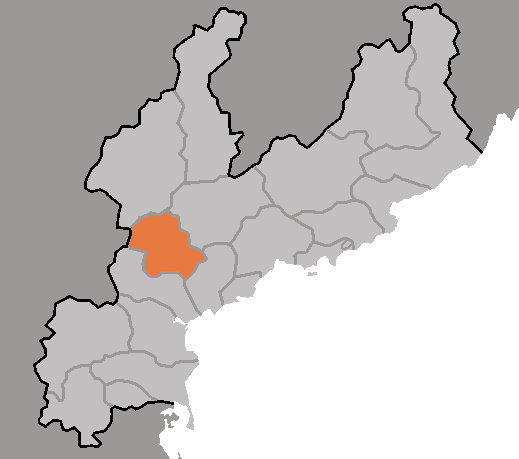
- Map of South Hamgyong showing the location of Yonggwang
- Country: North Korea
- Province: South Hamgyong
- Administrative divisions: 1 ŭp, 1 workers' district, 24 ri

Population (2008)
  - Total: 103,532

Yŏnggwang County is a county in South Hamgyŏng province, North Korea.

== Geography ==
The county is primarily mountainous, and is traversed by the Pujŏllyŏng Mountains (부전령산맥). However, there are areas of rolling and level ground, especially along the Sŏngch'ŏn River (성천강). Other significant streams include the Hŭngrim River (흑림강), Chadongch'ŏn (자동천), Ch'ŏnbulsanch'ŏn (천불산천), and Kigokch'ŏn (기곡천). Roughly 80% of the county is occupied by forestland. The highest point is Mataesan.

== Administrative divisions ==
Yŏnggwang County is divided into 1 ŭp (town), 1 rodongjagu (workers' districts) and 24 ri (villages):

- Yŏnggwang-ŭp
- Sujŏl-lodongjagu
- Chadong-ri
- Changhŭng-ri
- Chŏndong-ri
- Chungsang-ri
- Ch'ŏnbulsal-li
- Huju-ri
- Hŭngbong-ri
- Hwajang-ri
- Inda-ri
- Kisang-ri
- Kwansu-ri
- Ponghŭng-ri
- P'ungho-ri
- P'ungsang-ri
- Ryongdong-ri
- Samhŭng-ri
- Sanch'ang-ri
- Sangt'ong-ri
- Sanjung-ri
- Sindŏng-ri
- Sinsang-ri
- Ssangsong-ri
- Tongjung-ri
- Tongyang-ri

== History ==
It was originally part of Hamju County, from which it was separated in a general reorganization of local government in 1952. When it was initially split from Hamju, it was known as Oro(五老) County which was named after the nickname for Cannabis sativa plant which was traditionally used as a textile plant in korea. The county was renamed in 1981 by the North Korean government as Yŏnggwang (Korean word meaning glory), to say the county is "a town of glory where love and compassion of the Glorious Leader exists", or alternatively because "it hoststhe revolutionary sites of Kim Jong Suk Kim Il sung and Kim jong il" It is the site of one of the steles erected by Chinhŭng of Silla in the 6th century.

== Economy ==
Despite the rugged terrain, there is agriculture in Yŏnggwang. Local crops include maize, rice, soybeans, wheat, and barley. Small-scale orchards and livestock operations also exist. There are deposits of coal and gold. In addition, hydroelectric power is produced in the region.

== Transportation ==
The Sinhŭng and Changjin lines of the Korean State Railway pass through the county, which is also served by roads.

== See also ==
- Geography of North Korea
- Administrative divisions of North Korea
