= Taehung mine =

Magnesium mine in North Korea

Coordinates: 41.0735°N 128.8513°E

- Interactive map of Taehung mine
- Location: Tanchon, South Hamgyong Province, North Korea
- Products: Magnesium

The Taehung Youth Hero Mine (대흥청년영웅광산) is one of the largest magnesium mines in North Korea and in the world. The mine is located in the center of the country in South Hamgyong Province. The mine has about 2 billion tonnes of Magnesite. However, facilities have become antiquated and an unstable electricity supply limits the full exploitation of the resources.
