= Danpung Railway =

Japanese colonial company in Korea

Tanfū Railway

Overview
- Native name: 단풍철도주식회사 (Danpung Cheoldo Jusikhoesa) 端豊鉄道株式会社 (Tanpō Tetsudō Kabushiki Kaisha)

The Tanpō Railway (Japanese: 端豊鉄道株式会社, Tanpō Tetsudō Kabushiki Kaisha; Korean: 단풍철도주식회사, Danpung Cheoldo Jusikhoesa), was a privately owned railway company in Japanese-occupied Korea.

== History ==
The name of the railway was formed from the first characters of the names of the starting point, Tansen on the Kankyō Line of the Chōsen Government Railway, and Hōzan, the county seat of Hōzan County. The initial section of the mainline, 80.3 km (49.9 mi) from Tansen to Kōkun, was opened on 26 August 1939. A 10.3 km (6.4 mi) branchline from Kojō (now called Heocheon) to Mantoku was also opened, but the planned continuation from Kōkun to Hōzan was not completed before the fall of Japan at the end of the Pacific War.

Following the partition of Korea, the entirety of the Danpung Railway's network was located in the Soviet zone of occupation. The Provisional People's Committee for North Korea nationalised all railways in the northern half of the country on 10 August 1946, and following the establishment of North Korea, the Korean State Railway was created, which renamed the line Hŏch'ŏn Line. Damage sustained by the line during the Korean War was repaired, but the extension to Pungsan (renamed Kimhyonggwonin 1990) was never built.

== Services ==
In the November 1942 timetable, the last issued prior to the start of the Pacific War, the Tanpō Railway was running three trains each day from Tansen to Kōkun, and four each day on the return trip.

Supung - Cheongsu
Distance (read down)	Price Korean yen	-	-	-	Station name	Distance (read up)	Price Korean yen	-	-	-	-
0.0	-	07:20	13:00	19:05	Dancheon	80.3	3.25	09:40	16:20	19:50	00:10
80.3	3.25	13:20	18:00	00:05	Honggun	0.0	-	04:40	11:20	14:50	19:10

== Rolling Stock ==
One Class 4110 steam locomotive was sent from the Japanese Government Railway to the Danpung Railway after conversion to standard gauge.

== Network ==
Main line
Distance		Station name				
Total; km	S2S; km	Transcribed, Korean	Transcribed, Japanese	Hunminjeongeum	Hanja/Kanji	Connections
0.0	0.0	Dancheon	Tansen	단천	端川	Sentetsu Hamgyeong Line
7.0	7.0	Dongdae	Tōdai	동대	東坮	
21.1	14.1	Haunseung	Shimounshō	하운승	下雲承	
32.6	11.5	Sangnong	Jōnō	상농	上農	
39.3	6.7	Jungchon	Chūson	중촌	中村	
43.5	4.2	Nongchon	Nōson	농촌	農村	
49.7	6.2	Chudong	Shūtō	추동	楸洞	
54.7	5.0	Goseong	Kojō	고성	古城	Mandeok Line
60.9	6.2	Suui	Shugi	수의	守義	
67.1	6.2	Jangpa	Chōha	장파	長坡	
71.3	4.2	Bochiri	Hoshiri	보치리	浦淄里	
78.9	7.6	Hahonggun	Shimokōkun	하홍군	下洪君	
80.3	1.4	Honggun	Kōkun	홍군	洪君	

満徳線 - 만덕선 - Mantoku Line - Mandeok Line
Distance		Station name				
Total; km	S2S; km	Transcribed, Korean	Transcribed, Japanese	Hunminjeongeum	Hanja/Kanji	Connections
0.0	0.0	Goseong	Kojō	고성	古城	main line
6.6	6.6	Budong	Futō	부동	釜洞	
10.3	3.7	Mandeok	Mantoku	만덕	満徳	
