= Madaesan (South Hamgyong) =

Mountain in North Korea

Highest point
- Elevation: 1,745 m (5,725 ft)

Geography
- Location: South Hamgyong, North Korea

Madaesan is a mountain of North Korea. It has an elevation of 1,745 metres. It stands between Changjin County and Yonggwang County in South Hamgyong Province.

== See also ==
- List of mountains of Korea
