= Ponghwa Chemical Factory =

Oil refinery in North Korea

Coordinates: 40°4′N 124°33′E

The Ponghwa Chemical Factory (Korean: 봉화화학공장, "Torchlight Chemical Factory") is the larger of North Korea's two oil refineries. Construction began in 1976, and the site was fully operational in September 1980.

It is located in Sinŭiju, on the river border with Dandong in China, and originally was supplied with crude by rail from the Daqing Oil Field in China. The other refinery is the Sŭngri Refinery on North Korea's Tumen River border with Russia.

In 2019, NK News reported that to the refinery was expanded with Fluid catalytic cracking being implemented into the refinery, likely increasing production of gasoline and diesel.
