= Hamju County =

Hamju County 함주군
- County

Korean transcription(s)
  - Chosŏn'gŭl: 함주군
  - Hancha: 咸州郡
  - McCune-Reischauer: Hamju kun
  - Revised Romanization: Hamju-gun
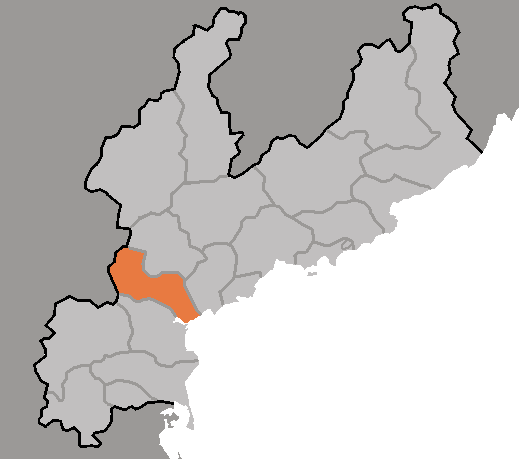
- Map of South Hamgyong showing the location of Hamju
- Country: North Korea
- Province: South Hamgyong Province
- Administrative divisions: 1 ŭp, 36 ri

Area
  - Total: 693 km^{2} (268 sq mi)

Population (2008)
  - Total: 133,896
  - Density: 193/km^{2} (500/sq mi)

Hamju County (Korean: 함주군) is a county in South Hamgyong province, North Korea.

== Physical features ==
The county's highest point is Norabong. The chief river is the Sangch'ŏn River (상천강). Aside from the coastal area, Hamju is mountainous throughout. It is cold, but is distinguished by the occurrence of foehn winds in the upland areas. Due to this, the climate is milder than the Yellow Sea coastal regions.

== Administrative divisions ==
Hamju county is divided into 1 ŭp (town) and 36 ri (villages):

- Hamju-ŭp
- Chaeal-li
- Chisŏng-ri
- Choyang-ri
- Chusŏl-li
- Ch'ŏngwŏl-li
- Ch'usang-ri
- Hangsu-ri
- Hongbong-ri
- Hŭngsŏ-ri
- Koyang-ri
- Kusang-ri
- Puhŭng-ri
- Pulgŭnbyŏl-li
- P'ogu-ri
- P'ohang-ri
- P'ungsong-ri
- P'ungsŏng-ri
- Rodong-ri
- Ryong'al-li
- Ryŏnji-ri
- Ryŏnp'o-ri
- Sangch'ang-ri
- Sangjung-ri
- Sindŏng-ri
- Singyŏng-ri
- Sinha-ri
- Sinsang-ri
- Sinsŏl-li
- Songjŏng-ri
- Sudong-ri
- Suhŭng-ri
- Tong'am-ri
- Tongbong-ri
- Tongwŏl-li
- Unbong-ri
- Undong-ri
- Wŏndong-ri

== Economy ==
=== Agriculture and fishery ===
In the level regions, a large amount of rice is produced. Most agriculture in the county is dry-field farming, with crops including Deccan millet, red beans, soybeans, potatoes, and vegetables. Silkworms and livestock are also widely raised, and fishing is carried out along the coast.

=== Mining ===
Mining also takes place, with deposits of iron ore, cuprite, and other minerals.

== Transport ==
Hamju county is served by the P'yŏngra and Kŭmgol lines of the Korean State Railway, and by various roads.

== See also ==
- Administrative divisions of North Korea
- Geography of North Korea
