= JNR Class 4110 =

Japanese type 0-10-0 steam locomotive class

Class 4110
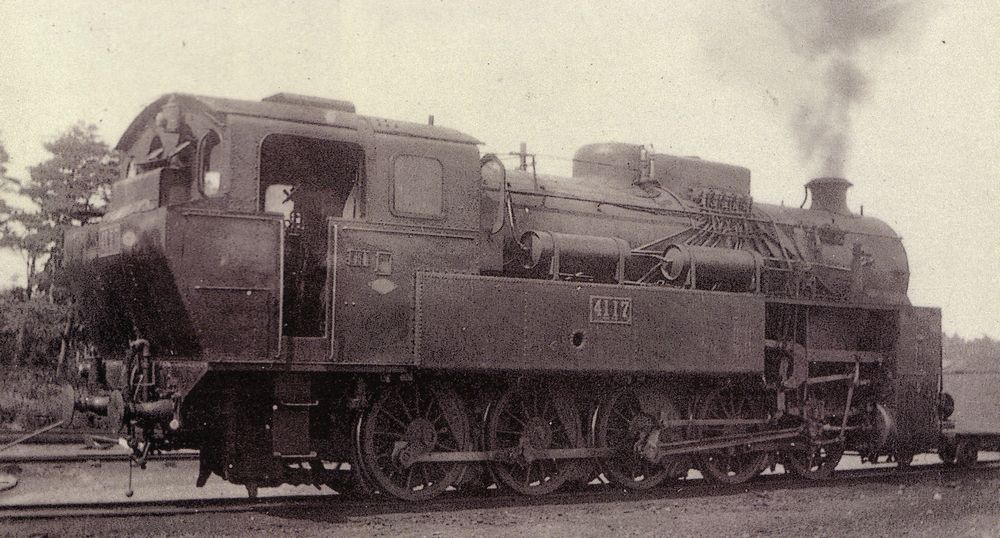
Type and origin
- Power type: Steam
- Builder: Kawasaki Shipyard
- Build date: 1914–1918
- Total produced: 39
Specifications
- Configuration
  - Whyte: 0-10-0T
  - UIC: E h2t
- Gauge: 1,067 mm (3 ft 6 in)
- Coupled dia.: 1,245 mm (4 ft 1.0 in)
- Wheelbase: 5,792 mm (19 ft 0 in)
  - Axle spacing (Asymmetrical): 1,448 mm (4 ft 9.0 in)
- Length: 11,507 mm (37 ft 9.0 in)
- Height: 3,787 mm (12 ft 5.1 in)
- Adhesive weight: 65.27 t (64.24 long tons; 71.95 short tons)
- Fuel type: coal
- Fuel capacity: 1.78 t (1.75 long tons; 1.96 short tons)
- Water cap.: 6.5 m^{3} (1,400 imp gal; 1,700 US gal)
- Firebox
  - Grate area: 2.23 m^{2} (24.0 ft^{2})
- Boiler
  - Tube plates: 3,962 mm (13 ft 0 in)
  - Small tubes: 136× 45 mm (1.8 in)
  - Large tubes: 21× 127 mm (5.0 in)
- Boiler pressure: 12.7 kg/cm^{2} (180 psi)
- Heating surface
  - Firebox: 8.9 m^{2} (96 ft^{2})
  - Tubes: 98.8 m^{2} (1,063 ft^{2})
  - Tubes and flues: 107.7 m^{2} (1,159 ft^{2})
  - Total surface: 140.5 m^{2} (1,512 ft^{2})
- Superheater
  - Heating area: 32.8 m^{2} (353 ft^{2})
- Cylinders: 2
- Cylinder size: 533 mm × 610 mm (21.0 in × 24.0 in)
- Valve gear: Walschaerts
- Loco brake: Steam and hand brake
- Train brakes: Vacuum
Performance figures
- Power output: 890 PS (650 kW; 880 hp)
- Tractive effort: 15,030 kgf (147.4 kN; 33,100 lbf)
Career
- Retired: 1950 (Japan); 1972–1976 (Korea); 1961–1968 (Taiwan)
- Withdrawn: 1950
- Preserved: 1
- Scrapped: 1950 (Japan); 1969–1976 (Korea); 1968 (Taiwan)

The Class 4110 (4110形) is a class of 0-10-0T steam locomotives built by the Japanese Government Railways (JGR) and designed by Hideo Shima. A total of 39 locomotives were built by Kawasaki Shipyard (present-day Kawasaki Heavy Industries) and operated on the steep sections of major trunk lines such as the Ōu Main Line.

It was based on the 4100 type design imported from the Kingdom of Bavaria in 1912 (Meiji 45, Taisho era) and followed the same format in terms of basic function.

Five members of the class were converted to standard gauge and sent to Korea, Empire of Japan in 1939, four to the Pyeongbuk Railway and one to the Danpung Railway. After the partition of Korea in 1945, these five were taken over by the Korean State Railway of North Korea. Their subsequent fate is unknown, but it was assumed they were scrapped between 1969 and 1976. Some 4110s were sent to Taiwan during the occupation period. In 1945, all were reclassified as EK900 by the Taiwan Railways. All of the EK900’s were scrapped between 1961 and 1968.

== Preserved examples ==
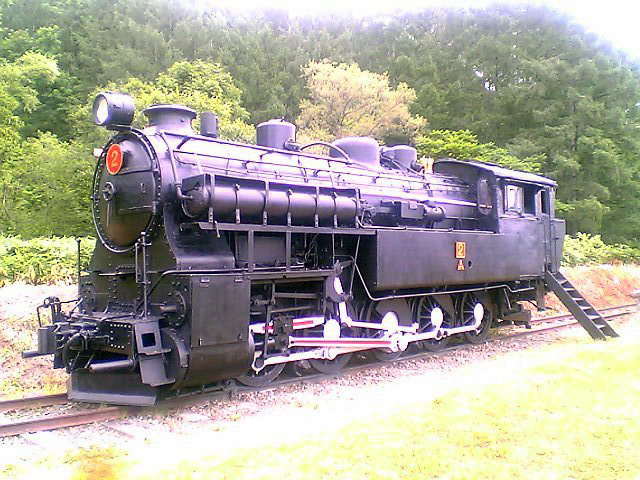
Bibai Railway No. 2 preserved in Bibai, Hokkaido

One Class 4110 remains in preservation: 4122 in Ebetsu, Hokkaido.

== Gallery ==
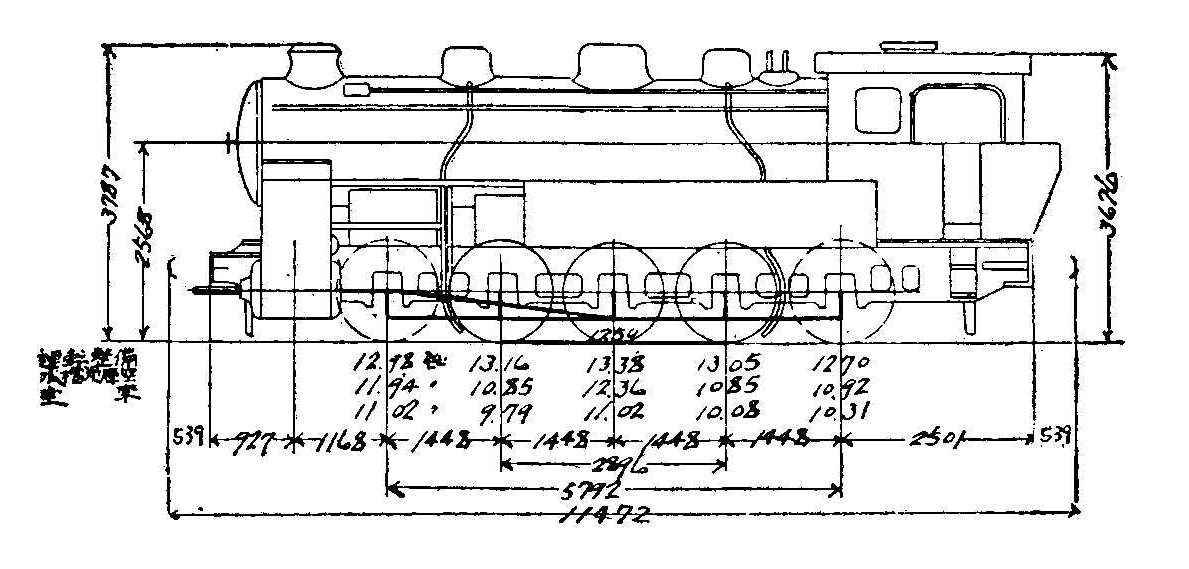
Type drawing of a JGR Class 4110 steam locomotive.

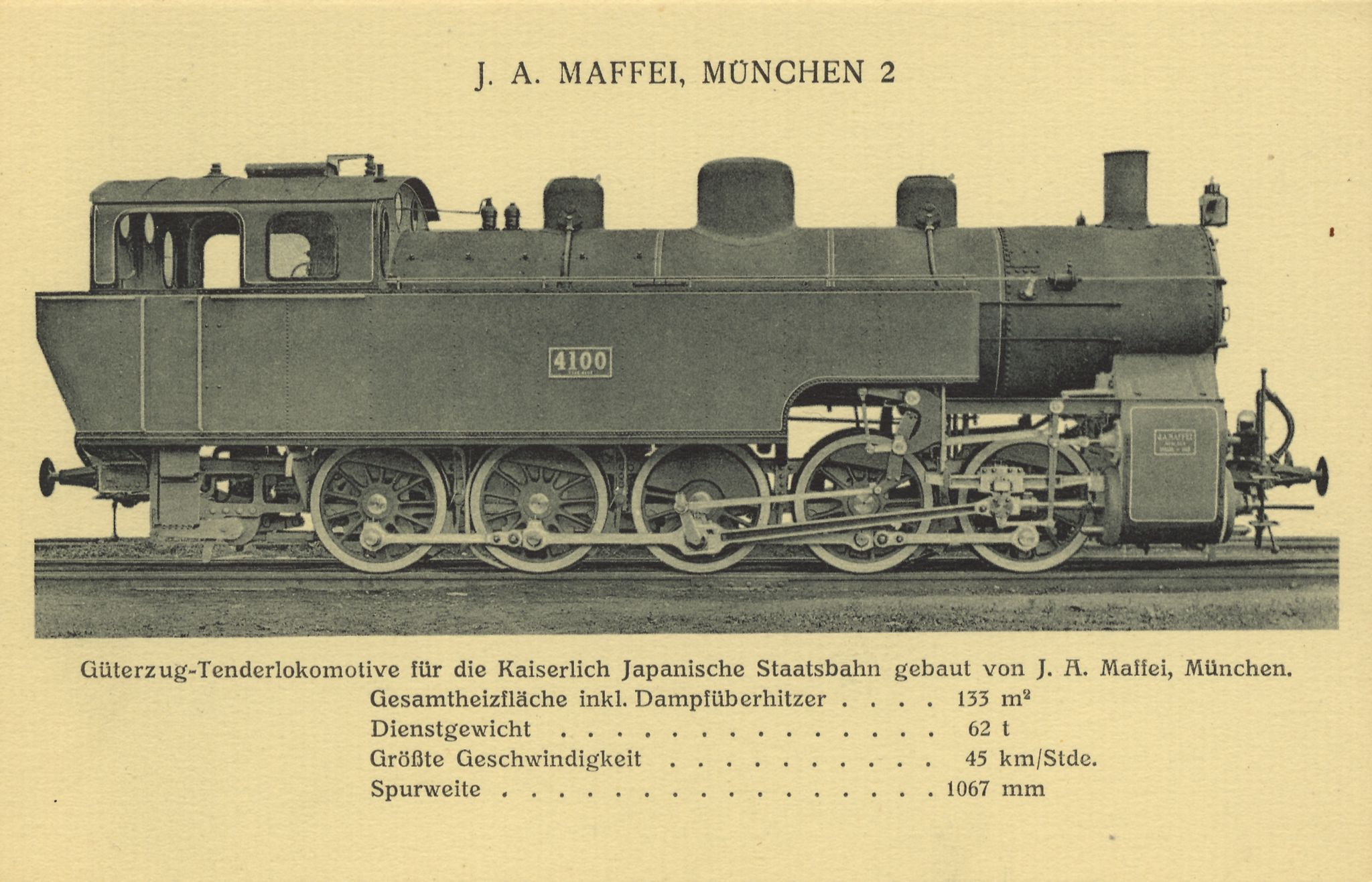

== See also ==
- Japan Railways locomotive numbering and classification
