= Yebongsan =

Mountain in South Korea

Highest point
- Elevation: 683.2 m (2,241 ft)
- Coordinates: 37°34′N 127°16′E

Naming
- Native name: 예봉산 (Korean); 禮峰山 (Korean)

Geography
- Location: South Korea

Korean name
- Hangul: 예봉산
- Hanja: 禮峰山
- RR: Yebongsan
- MR: Yebongsan

Yebongsan (Korean: 예봉산) is a mountain near Namyangju, Gyeonggi-do in South Korea. It has an elevation of 683.2 m (2,241 ft).

== See also ==
- List of mountains in Korea
