= Kumya Bay Important Bird Area =

Bird area

Coordinates: 39°24′00″N 127°25′00″E

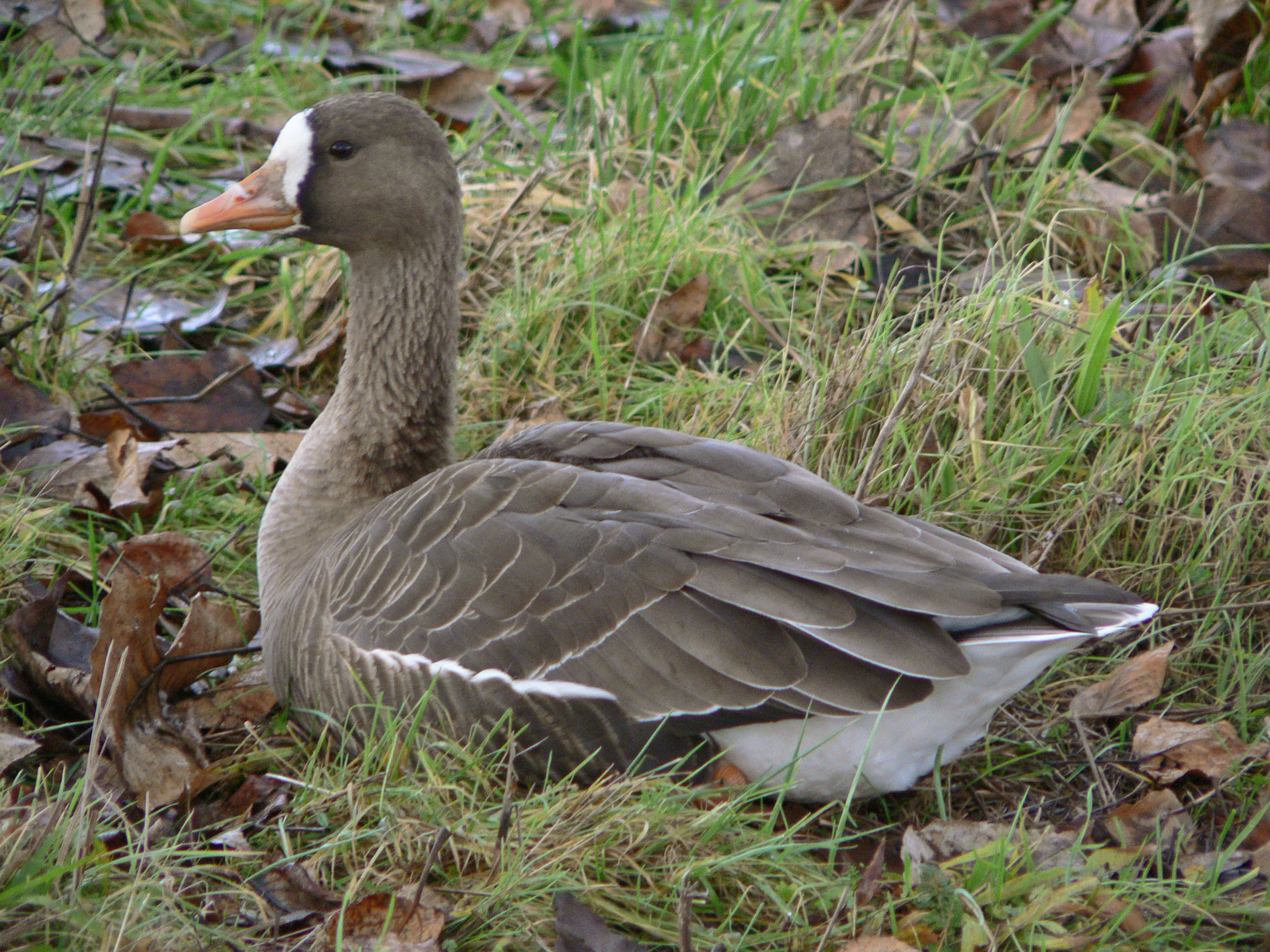
The bay is an important wintering site for greater white-fronted geese

The Kumya Bay Important Bird Area (금야습지) lies on the eastern coast of North Korea on the Sea of Japan. It comprises 4500 ha of estuarine waters, rivers, and saltpans, encompassing a 2000 ha protected area. It has been identified by BirdLife International as an Important Bird Area (IBA) because it supports significant populations of various birds, including swan geese, bean geese, greater white-fronted geese, mute swans, whooper swans, Steller's sea-eagles, white-naped cranes, and red-crowned cranes.
