= Orangchon Power Stations =

Hydroelectric power stations in North Korea

Orangchan Power Station Project
- Country: North Korea
- Location: North Hamgyong Province
- Coordinates: 41°20′57.55″N 129°23′25.18″E
- Status: Commissioned
- Construction began: 1981
- Commission date: 5 August 2022
- Owner: Government of North Korea

Power generation
- Capacity factor: 134500kw

Orangchon Power Project is an ongoing hydroelectric construction project, described as North Korea's "most ambitious hydroelectric projects during the past thirty years". The project crosses 45 km of the Orang River and stretches through 40 km of water tunnels, past 4 dams and 5 power stations. The country estimates that the project will produce 134,500 kW in energy.

== History ==
The project began under the leadership of Kim Il Sung in 1981 but stagnated for a variety of reasons, but resumed in 2000 when Kim Jong Il visited the site and assigned "national priority" to the completion of the project. In 2018, Kim Jong Un visited the site and was reportedly "extremely furious" over lax management when he inspected the site.

== Present ==
In August 2022, the final power station was built, Orangchon Power Plant No.3, 41 years after North Korea's former leader Kim Il Sung first announced it. An audit statement of Power Plant No.3 concluded that the facility assembly and transmission line construction was performed well.
