= Obongsan (South Chungcheong) =

Mountain of Chungcheongnam-do, South Korea

Highest point
- Elevation: 262 m (860 ft)

Geography
- Location: South Chungcheong Province, South Korea

Obongsan is a mountain of South Chungcheong Province, western South Korea. It has an elevation of 262 metres.

== See also ==
- List of mountains of Korea
