= Obongsan (Yangsan) =

Mountain of Gyeongsangnam-do, South Korea

Highest point
- Elevation: 967 m (3,173 ft)

Geography
- Location: South Gyeongsang Province, South Korea

Obongsan is a mountain of South Gyeongsang Province, southeastern South Korea. It has an elevation of 967 metres.

== See also ==
- List of mountains of Korea
