= Obongsan (Sangju) =

Mountain of Gyeongsangbuk-do, eastern South Korea

Highest point
- Elevation: 235 m (771 ft)

Geography
- Location: North Gyeongsang Province, South Korea

Obongsan is a mountain of North Gyeongsang Province, eastern South Korea. It has an elevation of 235 metres.

== See also ==
- List of mountains of Korea
