= Maebongsan (Wonju and Yeongwol) =

Mountain in South Korea

Highest point
- Elevation: 1,095 m (3,593 ft)

Geography
- Location: South Korea

Korean name
- Hangul: 매봉산
- Hanja: 梅峰山
- RR: Maebongsan
- MR: Maebongsan

Maebongsan (Korean: 매봉산) is a mountain between Yeongwol County and Wonju, Gangwon Province, South Korea. It has an elevation of 1,095 m (3,593 ft).

== See also ==
- List of mountains in Korea
