= Namsan (Chagang) =

Hill in Chagang Province, North Korea

Namsan (Korean: 남산; Hanja: 南山; lit. South Mountain) is a 539-meter peak in Chagang Province, North Korea.
