= Kumgol station =

Railway station in North Korea

Kŭmgol 금골역

Korean name
- Hangul: 금골역
- Hanja: 金골驛
- Revised Romanization: Geumgolyeok
- McCune–Reischauer: Kŭmgolyŏk

General information
- Location: Kŭmgol 1-dong, Tanch'ŏn, South Hamgyŏng; North Korea
- Coordinates: 40.9191°N 128.8125°E
- Owner: Korean State Railway
- Platforms: 2 (1 island)
- Tracks: 6 (+2 sidings)

History
- Opened: 1961

Services
Preceding station	Korean State Railway	Following station
Sindŏk towards Muhak	Kumgol Line	Paekkŭmsan towards Yŏhaejin
Location

Kŭmgol station is a railway station in Kŭmgol 1-dong, greater Tanch'ŏn city, South Hamgyŏng province, North Korea, on the Kŭmgol Line of the Korean State Railway. It was opened in 1961.

A trolleybus line formerly ran from next to the railway station to Kumgol 3-dong serving the Komdok mining area, though no trolleybuses have run since 2011 and the loop line next to the station has been dismantled around or before 2015.
