= Obongsan (Hoengseong and Pyeongchang) =

Mountain of Gangwon-do, South Korea

Coordinates: 38.001°N 127.806°E

Highest point
- Elevation: 1,136 m (3,727 ft)

Geography
- Location: South Korea

Obongsan is a mountain of South Korea. It has an elevation of 1,136 metres.

== See also ==
- List of mountains in Korea
