= Obongsan (South Hamgyong) =

Mountain in South Hamyong, North Korea

Highest point
- Elevation: 1,289 m (4,229 ft)

Geography
- Location: South Hamgyong, North Korea

Obongsan is a mountain of North Korea. It has an elevation of 1,289 metres. It stands between Yodok County and Sudong district in South Hamgyong Province.

== See also ==
- List of mountains of Korea
