= Jiktong coal mine =

Mine in South Pyongan Province, North Korea

Jiktong Coal Mine
- Location: Unsan County, South Pyongan Province, North Korea
- Products: Coal

The February 8 Jiktong Coal Mine(2.8직동청년탄광) is a coal mine in South Pyongan Province, North Korea. It is part of the Sunchon Area Youth Coal-mining Complex. The mine has coal reserves amounting to 330 million tonnes of lignite, one of the largest lignite reserves in Asia, and it produces 1 million tonnes of coal per year.
