= Maebongsan (South Hwanghae) =

Mountain in North Korea

Highest point
- Elevation: 197 m (646 ft)

Geography
- Location: South Hwanghae, North Korea

Maebongsan is a mountain of North Korea. It has an elevation of 197 metres. It stands in Pongchon County, South Hwanghae Province.

== See also ==
- List of mountains of Korea
