= Maebongsan (Poptong) =

Mountain in North Korea

Highest point
- Elevation: 1,578 m (5,177 ft)

Geography
- Location: Kangwon, North Korea

Maebongsan is a mountain of North Korea. It has an elevation of 1,578 metres. It stands in the middle of Poptong County in Kangwon Province.

== See also ==
- List of mountains of Korea
