= Korean Peninsula Energy Development Organization =

Organization

- Formation: March 15, 1995; 31 years ago
- Founders: United States, South Korea, Japan
- Defunct: 2006; 20 years ago
- Location: New York, United States
- Coordinates: 40°05′43″N 128°20′29″E
- Fields: Nuclear power
- Website: www.kedo.org

The Korean Peninsula Energy Development Organization (KEDO) was an organization founded on March 15, 1995, by the United States, South Korea, and Japan to implement the 1994 U.S.-North Korea Agreed Framework that froze North Korea's indigenous nuclear power plant development centered at the Yongbyon Nuclear Scientific Research Center, that was suspected of being a step in a nuclear weapons program. KEDO's principal activity was to construct two light water reactor nuclear power plants in North Korea to replace North Korea's Magnox type reactors. The original target year for completion was 2003.

Since then, other members joined:

- 1995: Australia, Canada, New Zealand
- 1996: Argentina, Chile, Indonesia
- 1997: European Union, Poland
- 1999: Czech Republic
- 2000: Uzbekistan

KEDO discussions took place at the level of a U.S. Assistant Secretary of State, South Korea's deputy foreign minister, and the head of the Asian bureau of Japan's Foreign Ministry.

The KEDO Secretariat was located in New York. KEDO was shut down in 2006.

== History ==
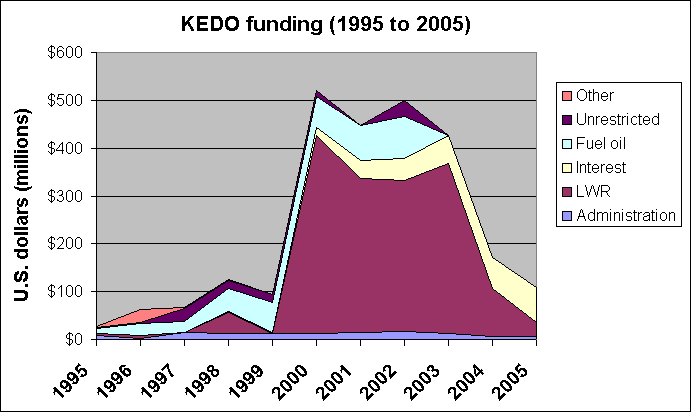
KEDO funding per year 1995 to 2005

KEDO funding by country (1995 to 2005)
Country	U.S. dollars (millions)
South Korea	1,455
Japan	498
United States	405
European Atomic; Energy Community	122
Australia	14
Others	18

Formal ground breaking on the site for two light water reactors (LWR) was on August 19, 1997, at Kumho, 30 km north of Sinpo. The Kumho site had been previously selected for two similar sized reactors that had been promised in the 1980s by the Soviet Union, before its collapse.

Soon after the Agreed Framework was signed, U.S. Congress control changed to the Republican Party, who did not support the agreement. Some Republican Senators were strongly against the agreement, regarding it as appeasement. KEDO's first director, Stephen Bosworth, later commented "The Agreed Framework was a political orphan within two weeks after its signature".

Arranging project financing was not easy, and formal invitations to bid were not issued until 1998, by which time the delays were infuriating North Korea. Significant spending on the LWR project did not commence until 2000, with "First Concrete" pouring at the construction site on August 7, 2002. Construction of both reactors was well behind the original schedule.

In the wake of the breakdown of the Agreed Framework in 2003, KEDO largely lost its function. KEDO ensured that the nuclear power plant project assets at the construction site at Kumho in North Korea and at manufacturers' facilities around the world ($1.5 billion invested to date) were preserved and maintained. The project was reported to be about 30% complete. One reactor containment building was about 50% complete and another about 15% finished. No key equipment for the reactors had been moved to the site.

In 2005, there were reports indicating that KEDO had agreed in principle to terminate the light-water reactor project. On January 9, 2006, it was announced that the project was over and the workers would be returning to their home countries. North Korea demanded compensation and has refused to return the approximately $45 million worth of equipment left behind.

== Executive Directors ==
- Stephen W. Bosworth, 1995–1997
- L. Desaix Anderson, 1997–2001
- Charles Kartman, 2001–2005

== See also ==
- Division of Korea
- Six-party talks
