= Obongsan (Kosong–Kumgang) =

Mountain in Kangwon, North Korea

Highest point
- Elevation: 1,264 m (4,147 ft)

Geography
- Location: Kangwon Province, North Korea

Obongsan is a mountain of North Korea. It has an elevation of 1,264 metres. It stands between Kumgang and Kosong County in Kangwon Province.

== See also ==
- List of mountains of Korea
