= Tongam station =

Railway station in North Korea

Tongam 동암

Korean name
- Hangul: 동암역
- Hanja: 東岩驛
- Revised Romanization: Dongam-yeok
- McCune–Reischauer: Tongam-yŏk

General information
- Location: Tongam-dong, Tanch'ŏn, South Hamgyŏng; North Korea
- Coordinates: 40.6570°N 128.9175°E
- Owner: Korean State Railway
- Platforms: 2 (1 island)
- Tracks: 3 (+2 sidings)

History
- Opened: 30 March 1943

Services
Preceding station	Korean State Railway	Following station
Such'on towards Muhak	Kumgol Line	Tongdŏk towards Yŏhaejin
Location

Tongam station is a railway station in Tongam-dong, greater Tanch'ŏn city, South Hamgyŏng province, North Korea, on the Kŭmgol Line of the Korean State Railway. It was opened on 30 March 1943 along with the rest of the Yŏhaejin–Tongam section of the line.
