= Sŭngri Petrochemical Complex =

Oil refinery in North Korea

Coordinates: 42°18′43″N 130°20′55″E

The Sŭngri Petrochemical Complex (승리화학련합기업소) is a Russian-design oil refinery, with a capacity of 2 million tons, located in Sŏnbong, Rasŏn Special Economic Zone, North Korea. It was served by the Sŭngri Line of the Korean State Railway. The refinery was constructed with aid from the Soviet Union under the North-Soviet Union Agreement for Cooperation on Economy, Science and Technology.

Construction of the refinery began in August 1968 and completed in 1973. A second phase was completed in 1979. The refinery has ceased operations since 1994.

== Investment ==
In 2013, Mongolian firm HBOil bought a 20% share in the refinery with intention to supply crude oil to Sŭngri and export refined products to Mongolia. In 2016, South Korean newspaper Korea Joongang Daily reported HBOil had withdrawn from the deal, following pressure from the international community due to North Korea's ongoing nuclear weapon and missile testing. HBOil publicly denied the claims.
