= Kumgol Line =

Railway line in North Korea

Kŭmgol Line

Overview
- Other name(s): Hamnam Line 함남선(咸南線)
- Native name: 금골선
- Status: Operational
- Owner: Chosen Magnesite Development Railway (1943–1945); Korean State Railway (since 1945)
- Locale: South Hamgyŏng
- Termini: Yŏhaejin; Muhak
- Stations: 17

Service
- Type: Heavy rail, Passenger/freight rail Regional rail

History
- Opened: 1943 (Yŏhaejin–Paekkŭmsan); 1962 (Paekkŭmsan–Kŭmgol) after 1988 (Kŭmgol–Muhak)

Technical
- Line length: 83.4 km (51.8 mi)
- Number of tracks: Single track
- Track gauge: 1,435 mm (4 ft 8 1/2 in) standard gauge
- Electrification: 3000 V DC Overhead line
- Maximum incline: 26‰
Route map
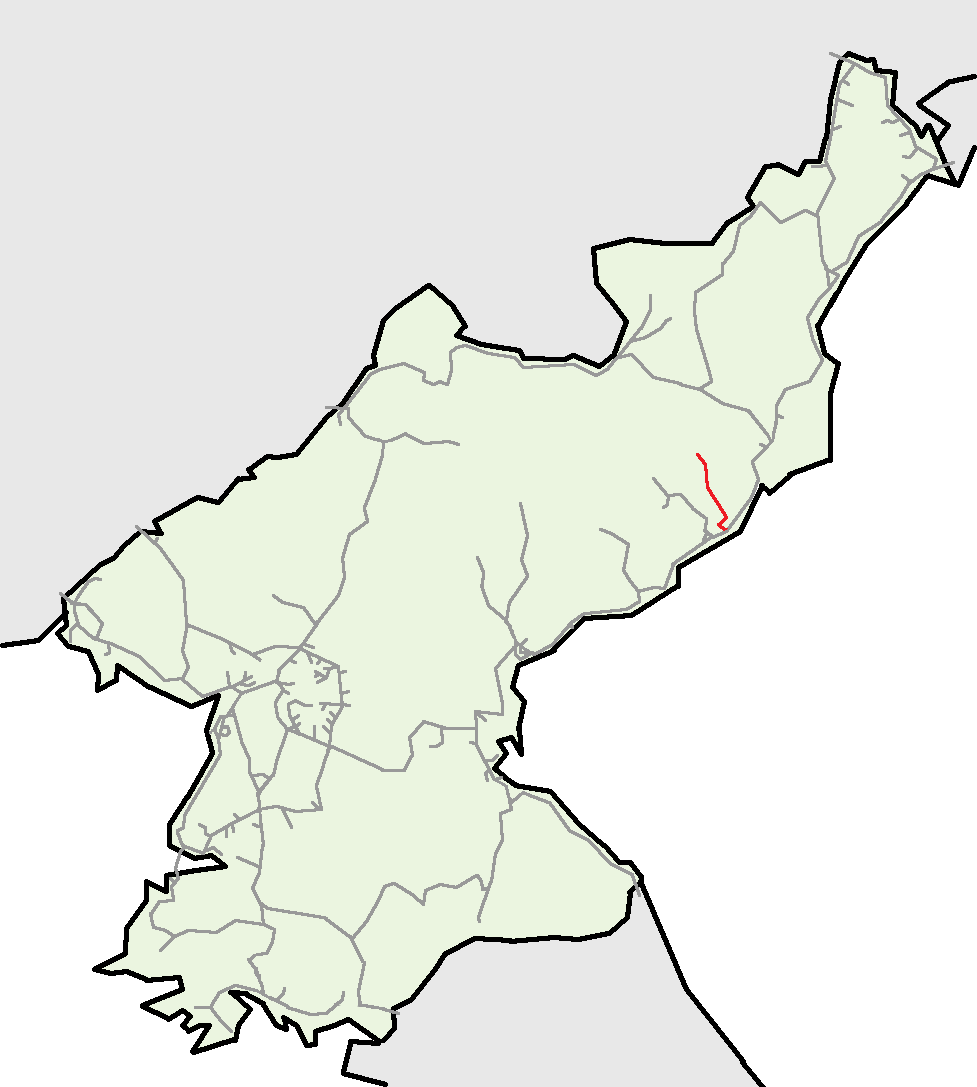

- Kumgol Line
- Chosŏn'gŭl: 금골선
- Hancha: 金골線
- Revised Romanization: Geumgolseon
- McCune–Reischauer: Kŭmgolsŏn

The Kŭmgol Line (Korean: 금골선) is an electrified standard-gauge secondary line of the North Korean State Railway running from Yŏhaejin on the P'yŏngra Line to Muhak. Located entirely in Tanch'ŏn city, South Hamgyŏng - one of the DPRK's most important mining areas - freight trains moving ore from the mines on the line to the P'yŏngra Line form the bulk of the line's traffic.

The line is in relatively severe terrain, with a ruling grade of 26‰. There are 45 bridges with a total length of 3,112 m (10,210 ft), and 30 tunnels with a total of 8,241 m (27,037 ft).

== History ==
Originally called the Hamnam Line, it was built by the privately owned Chosen Magnesite Development Railway (Japanese: 朝鮮マグネサイト開発鉄道 Chōsen Magunesaito Kaihatsu Tetsudō, Korean: 조선 마그네사이트 개발 철도; MR: Chosŏn Magŭnesaitŭ Kaebal Ch'ŏldo), to exploit the magnesite deposits of the Kŏmdŏk district; the company was granted a licence to operate passenger trains on 25 March 1943. The first section, 27.7 km from Yŏhaejin on the P'yŏngra Line to Tongam, was opened on 30 March 1943, followed by a 32 km extension from Tongam to Ryongyang (nowadays called Paekkŭmsan) that was opened on 4 December of the same year.

After the partition of Korea following the end of World War 2 and the subsequent establishment of the DPRK, the line was nationalised and its name was changed to the current name. In 1961-62 the line, which by that time was outdated in technical terms, was upgraded with modern equipment; at the same time, a 3.7 km (2.3 mi) extension from Paekkŭmsan to Kŭmgol was built. The entire line was then electrified in 1977, improving the total capacity, safety and train speeds on the line. The final 20 km (12 mi) extension from Kŭmgol to Muhak was built after 1988.

== Services ==
=== Freight ===
Freight movements make up by far the largest amount of traffic on the Kŭmgol Line, with the bulk of that traffic moving from Kŭmgol to the connection with the P'yŏngra Line at Yŏhaejin - the vast majority of that traffic being magnesite ore from Paekkŭmsan and non-ferrous ores from the Kŏmdŏk Mining Complex. Northbound traffic is mainly coal, construction materials, foodstuffs and empty cars for ore-loading.

=== Passenger ===
The following passenger trains are known to operate on this line:

- Express trains 11/12, operating between P'yŏngyang and Kŭmgol, runs on this line between Yŏhaejin and Kŭmgol;
- Local trains 513/516 operate on this line between Kŭmgol and Muhak;
- Local trains 913/914 operate on this line between Tonsan and Paekkŭmsan.

== Route ==
A yellow background in the "Distance" box indicates that section of the line is not electrified.

Distance (km)		Station Name		Former Name		
Total	S2S	Transcribed	Chosŏn'gŭl (Hanja)	Transcribed	Chosŏn'gŭl (Hanja)	Connections
0.0	0.0	Yŏhaejin	여해진 (汝海津)			P'yŏngra Line
1.2	1.2	Ch'ŏn'gok	천곡 (泉谷)			Flag stop.
5.5	4.3	Taptong	답동 (畓洞)			
9.0	3.5	Kaŭng	가응(加應)			Flag stop.
14.1	5.1	Kwangch'ŏn	광천 (廣泉)	Yongjam	용잠 (龍岑)	
19.0	4.9	Unjŏn	운전 (雲田)			Flag stop.
23.3	4.3	Tongdŏk	동덕 (東德)	Hamnam Kwangch'ŏn	함남광천 (咸南廣泉)	
27.7	4.4	Tong'am	동암 (東巖)			
33.8	6.1	Such'on	수촌 (水村)			
36.7	2.9	Sinp'yŏng	신평 (新坪)			Flag stop.
42.8	6.1	Rip'a	리파 (梨坡)			
50.3	7.5	Sinjŭngsan	신증산 (新甑山)			
54.8	4.5	Tonsan	돈산 (-山)	Hamnam Unsong	함남운송 (咸南雲松)	
59.7	4.9	Paekkŭmsan	백금산 (白金山)	Yongyang	용양 (龍陽)	
63.4	3.7	Kŭmgol	금골 (金-)			
66.3	2.9	Sindŏk	신덕 (新德)			
68.9	2.6	Taesin	대신 (大新)			
77.3	8.4	Taehŭng	대흥 (大興)			
83.4	6.1	Muhak	무학 (舞鶴)			
