= Muhak station =

Railway station in North Korea

Muhak 무학

Korean name
- Hangul: 무학역
- Hanja: 舞鶴驛
- Revised Romanization: Muhak-yeok
- McCune–Reischauer: Muhak-yŏk

General information
- Location: Muhak-tong, Tanch'ŏn, South Hamgyŏng; North Korea
- Owner: Korean State Railway
- Platforms: 1
- Tracks: 4 (+3 sidings)

History
- Opened: after 1988

Services
Preceding station	Korean State Railway	Following station
Terminus	Kumgol Line	Taehŭng towards Yŏhaejin
Location

Muhak station is a railway station in Muhak-tong, greater Tanch'ŏn city, South Hamgyŏng province, North Korea, on the Kŭmgol Line of the Korean State Railway. It was opened sometime after 1988 along with the rest of the Kŭmgol–Muhak section of the line.
