= Yohaejin station =

Railway station in North Korea

Yŏhaejin 여해진

Korean name
- Hangul: 여해진역
- Hanja: 汝海津驛
- Revised Romanization: Yeohaejin-yeok
- McCune–Reischauer: Yŏhaejin-yŏk

General information
- Location: Tanch'ŏn, South Hamgyŏng; North Korea
- Coordinates: 40.4706°N 128.9896°E
- Owner: Korean State Railway
- Platforms: 2 (1 island)
- Tracks: 8

History
- Opened: 1924

Services
Preceding station	Korean State Railway	Following station
Munam towards P'yŏngyang	P'yŏngra Line	Ryŏngdae towards Rajin
Ch'ŏn'gok towards Muhak	Kumgol Line	Terminus
Location
- Location within North Korea

Yŏhaejin station is a railway station in greater Tanch'ŏn city, South Hamgyŏng province, North Korea. Located on the P'yŏngra Line of the Korean State Railway, it is also the starting point of the Kŭmgol Line. The station was opened in 1924.
