= Tanchon =

Tanchon 단천시
- Municipal City

Korean transcription(s)
  - Chosŏn'gŭl: 단천시
  - Hancha: 端川市
  - McCune-Reischauer: Tanch'ŏn-si
  - Revised Romanization: Dancheon-si
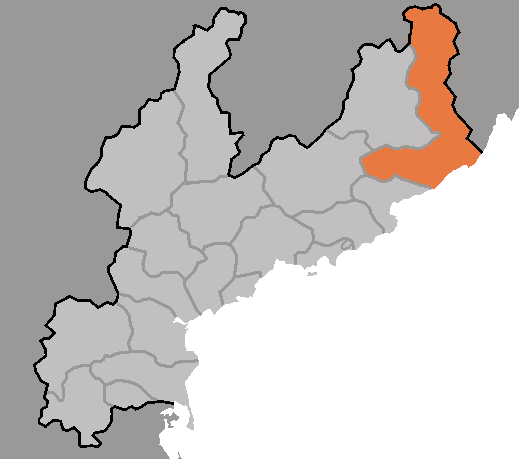
- Map of South Hamgyong showing the location of Tanchon

- Location within North Korea
- Coordinates: 40.458°N 128.911°E
- Country: North Korea
- Province: South Hamgyong Province
- Administrative divisions: 39 tong, 39 ri

Area
  - Total: 2,170 km^{2} (840 sq mi)

Population (2008)
  - Total: 345,876
  - Density: 159/km^{2} (413/sq mi)
  - Dialect: Hamgyŏng
- Time zone: UTC+9 (Pyongyang Time)

Tanch'ŏn (Korean pronunciation: [tan.tsʰʌn]) is a port city in northeastern South Hamgyŏng province, North Korea. It has a population of approximately 360,000. Tanch'ŏn borders the Sea of Japan (East Sea of Korea), into which the Namdae River flows.

== Administrative divisions ==
Tanch'ŏn is divided into 39 tong (neighbourhoods) and 39 ri (villages):

- Chich'o-dong
- Chikchŏl-dong
- Chŏnjin-dong
- Haean 1-dong
- Haean 2-dong
- Hanggu 1-dong
- Hanggu 2-dong
- Hanggu 3-dong
- Kŭmbong-dong
- Kŭmgol 1-dong
- Kŭmgol 2-dong
- Kŭmgol 3-dong
- Kŭmsan-dong
- Kwangch'ŏn-dong
- Muhak-tong
- Munhwa-dong
- Naemun-dong
- Namp'ung-dong
- Paeg'am-dong
- Paekkŭmsan-dong
- Ponsan-dong
- Pukch'ŏn-dong
- Puktu-dong
- P'ugŏ-dong
- Ryongdae-dong
- San'gwang-dong
- Sao-dong
- Sindanch'ŏn 1-dong
- Sindanch'ŏn 2-dong
- Taehŭng 1-dong
- Taehŭng 2-dong
- Taesin-dong
- T'amsi-dong
- Tŏkhŭng-dong
- Tong'am-dong
- Tonsan-dong
- Yangch'ŏn-dong
- Yangsan-dong
- Yŏng'ung-dong
- Changnae-ri
- Chŏngdong-ri
- Chŭngsal-li
- Hwajang-ri
- Kaŭng-ri
- Kawŏl-li
- Mun'am-ri
- Munho-ri
- O'mong-ri
- Paeksal-li
- Pokp'yŏng-ri
- Ponghwa-ri
- Rip'a-ri
- Ryŏngdae-ri
- Ryongjam-ri
- Ryŏngsal-li
- Ryongdŏng-ri
- Ryonghŭng-ri
- Ryongyŏl-li
- Samgŏ-ri
- Sindong-ri
- Sinho-ri
- Sinp'ung-ri
- Sinp'yŏng-ri
- Sŏk'u-ri
- Songjŏng-ri
- Songp'a-ri
- Ssangryong-ri
- Talch'ŏl-li
- Taptong-ri
- Tŏkchu-ri
- Tolsal-li
- Tuyŏl-li
- Unch'ŏl-li
- Wadong-ri
- Wŏnsal-li
- Yangp'yŏng-ri
- Yŏngp'yŏng-ri

== Economy ==
There are extensive mineral resources in the area, including cobalt, magnesite, and iron ore. The city is known for its chemical production, textiles, metal ware, machinery and smelting. The Komdok mine is located in Kumgol-1 dong. The Taehung mine is located in South Hamgyong Province.

The area is also home to the large Tanchon Power Station which began its two-staged construction in 2017. The project is planned to consist over 100 kilometres of waterway tunnels and six power stations. State media reported that the first stage was completed in May 2026, comprising power stations No.1, 5, and 6. As of August 2026, construction is undergoing for the second-stage Tanchon Power Station.

Technology

The City of Tanch'ŏn is featured in the PC game Tradewinds.

== Transport ==
Tanch'ŏn is situated on the P'yŏngra Line and the Hŏch'ŏn Line of the Korean State Railway. In 2012 the city's port was renovated and upgraded. Tanch'ŏn port was reconstructed, and a ceremony marking the completion was taken place in December 2012. In the ceremony, a joint congratulatory message sent by the Central Committee of the Workers’ Party of Korea and the Cabinet was read to the officials and members of shock brigades who performed labor feats in the construction of the port.

A trolleybus line runs within Tanchon from next to Kumgol station in Kumgol 1-dong to Kumgol 3-dong with a length of over 6 km. The line was opened in 1986 to serve the Komdok mining region though there have been no trolleybuses seen on satellite imagery since 2011.

== Wildlife ==
The population of Chinese gorals in Tanch'ŏn has been designated North Korean natural monument #293.

== Climate ==
Tanchon has a humid continental climate (Köppen climate classification: Dfa).

Climate data for Tanchon
Month	Jan	Feb	Mar	Apr	May	Jun	Jul	Aug	Sep	Oct	Nov	Dec	Year
Mean daily maximum °C (°F)	1.1 (34.0)	2.4 (36.3)	6.9 (44.4)	13.5 (56.3)	18.2 (64.8)	20.9 (69.6)	24.8 (76.6)	26.0 (78.8)	22.9 (73.2)	17.7 (63.9)	10.1 (50.2)	3.4 (38.1)	14.0 (57.2)
Daily mean °C (°F)	−4.4 (24.1)	−3.0 (26.6)	−1.8 (28.8)	7.6 (45.7)	12.4 (54.3)	16.1 (61.0)	20.6 (69.1)	22.0 (71.6)	17.9 (64.2)	11.9 (53.4)	4.9 (40.8)	−1.7 (28.9)	8.5 (47.4)
Mean daily minimum °C (°F)	−9.8 (14.4)	−8.3 (17.1)	−3.2 (26.2)	1.7 (35.1)	6.7 (44.1)	11.4 (52.5)	16.5 (61.7)	18.1 (64.6)	13.0 (55.4)	6.2 (43.2)	−0.3 (31.5)	−6.8 (19.8)	3.8 (38.8)
Average precipitation mm (inches)	23 (0.9)	18 (0.7)	24 (0.9)	37 (1.5)	53 (2.1)	83 (3.3)	129 (5.1)	156 (6.1)	108 (4.3)	45 (1.8)	47 (1.9)	27 (1.1)	750 (29.7)
Source: Climate-Data.org

== See also ==
- Administrative divisions of North Korea
- Geography of North Korea
- South Hamgyong
