= South Hamgyong Province =

Province of North Korea

South Hamgyong Province 함경남도
- Province

Korean transcription(s)
  - Chosŏn'gŭl: 함경남도
  - Hancha: 咸鏡南道
  - McCune-Reischauer: Hamgyŏngnam-do
  - Revised Romanization: Hamgyeongnam-do
- Coordinates: 40.240°N 127.531°E
- Country: North Korea
- Region: Kwannam
- Capital: Hamhung
- Subdivisions: 3 cities; 15 counties

Government
  - Provincial Party Committee Chief Secretary: Lee Jeong-nam (WPK)
  - Provincial People's Committee Chairman: Kim Yong Sik

Area
  - Total: 18,970 km^{2} (7,320 sq mi)

Population (2008)
  - Total: 3,066,013
  - Density: 161.6/km^{2} (418.6/sq mi)
- Time zone: UTC+9 (Pyongyang Time)
- Dialect: Hamgyong

South Hamgyong Province (Korean: 함경남도, Hamgyŏngnamdo; Korean pronunciation: [ham.ɡjʌŋ.nam.do]) is a province of North Korea. The province was formed in 1896 from the southern half of the former Hamgyong Province, remained a province of Korea until 1945, then became a province of North Korea. Its capital is Hamhung.

== Geography ==
The province is bordered by Ryanggang to the north, North Hamgyong to the northeast, Kangwon to the south, and South Pyongan to the west. To the east of the province is the Sea of Japan.

== Administrative divisions ==
South Hamgyong is divided into three cities ("si"), two districts (one "gu" and one "chigu"), and 15 counties ("gun"). These are further divided into villages (ri and dong, with dong also denoting neighborhoods in cities), with each county additionally having one town (up) which acts as its administrative center. These are detailed on each county's individual page. Some cities are also divided into wards known as "guyok", which are administered just below the city level and also listed on the individual page.

=== Cities ===
- Hamhung (capital)
  함흥시 / 咸興市
- Sinpo
  신포시 / 新浦市
- Tanchon
  단천시 / 端川市

=== Districts ===
- Kumho-chigu
  금호지구 / 琴湖地區

=== Counties ===
- Changjin County
  장진군 / 長津郡
- Chongpyong County
  정평군 / 定平郡
- Hamju County
  함주군 / 咸州郡
- Hochon County
  허천군 / 虛川郡
- Hongwon County
  홍원군 / 洪原郡
- Kowon County
  고원군 / 高原郡
- Kumya County
  금야군 / 金野郡
- Pujon County
  부전군 / 赴戰郡
- Pukchong County
  북청군 / 北靑郡
- Ragwon County
  락원군 / 樂園郡
- Riwon County
  리원군 / 利原郡
- Sinhung County
  신흥군 / 新興郡
- Sudong County
  수동군 / 水洞郡
- Toksong County
  덕성군 / 德城郡
- Yonggwang County
  영광군 / 榮光郡
- Yodok County
  요덕군 / 耀德郡

== See also ==
- Song of Dorang-seonbi and Cheongjeong-gaksi
