= Changjin (disambiguation) =

Changjin or Chang Jin or variant, may refer to:

== Places ==
- Changjin County (장진군, 長津郡), a county in South Hamgyong province, North Korea.
  - Lake Changjin (장진호, 長津湖), also known as the Chosin Reservoir, site of the Korean War battle
    - Changjin Line, an electrified rail line running alongside the lake
  - Changjin Air Force Base, in the eponymous county
- Changjin River (장진강; 長津江), a tributary of the Yalu River in North Korea

== People ==
=== Given name "Chang-jin" ===
- Jang Geum (Chinese: Chang-jin, 長今; Chángjīn), female physician of the Joseon Dynasty
- Moon Chang-jin (문창진; born 1993), South Korea soccer player
- Chang-Jin Lee, Korean-American artist

=== Given name "Jin" surnamed "Chang" ===
- Jang Jin (장진, 張鎭; born 1971; a.k.a. Chang Jin), a South Korean film director
- Chang Jin (Chinese: 常进; born 1966). Chinese astronomer

== Other uses ==
- Battle of Chosin Reservoir (a.k.a. Battle of Changjin), a 1950 battle during the Korean War

== See also ==
- Da Chang Jin (Great Chang Jin; 대장금; 大長今; English: Jewel in the Palace), a South Korean TV historical drama about the historical female physician Chang Jin
- Jinchang (disambiguation)
- Chang (disambiguation)
- Jin (disambiguation)
