= Chosin =

Chosin may refer to:

- USS Chosin (CG-65), a cruiser of the United States Navy
- Battle of Chosin Reservoir, a battle of the 1950–3 Korean War
- Chosin Reservoir, formally Lake Changjin, an artificial lake in Changjin County, South Hamgyong Province, North Korea
