= Changjin Air Force Base =

Military airport in Changjin, North Korea

Changjin-up
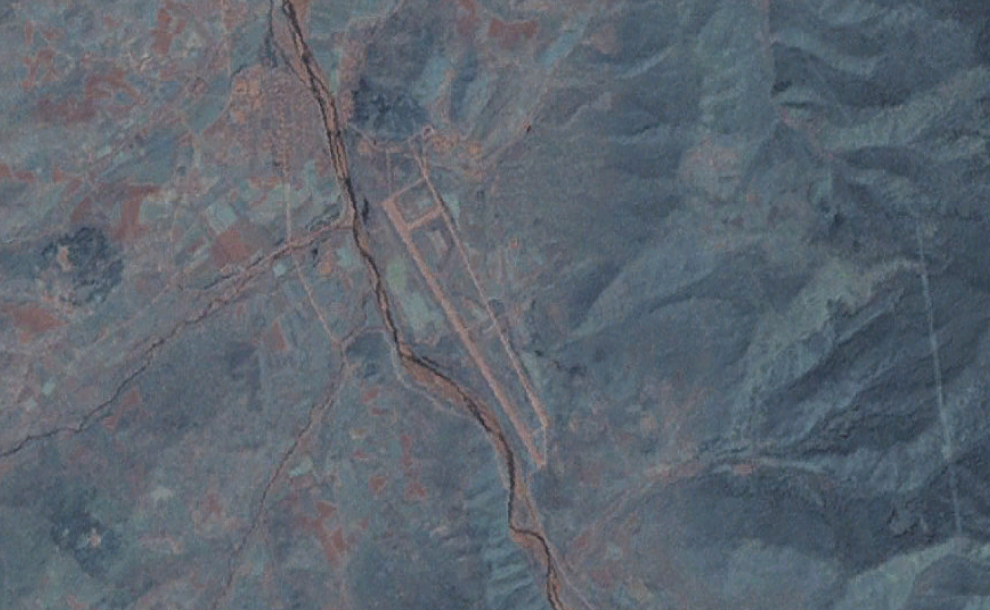
- IATA: N/A; ICAO: N/A; FAA LID: N/A

Summary
- Airport type: Military
- Serves: Changjin, North Korea
- Elevation AMSL: 3,457 ft (1,054 m)
- Coordinates: 40°21′51.60″N 127°15′50.80″E

Map
- Location within North Korea Location within Asia Location within North Pacific Location within Earth

Runways
Direction	Length		Surface
Direction	ft	m	Surface
16/34	9,170	2,795	Concrete

- Changjin Air Force Base
- Hangul: 장진비행장
- Hanja: 長津飛行場
- RR: Jangjin bihaengjang
- MR: Changjin pihaengjang

Changjin-up Air Force Base (Korean: 장진비행장) is a military airport in Changjin, South Hamgyong, North Korea.

== Facilities ==
The airfield has a single concrete runway, 16/34, which measures 9170 x 203 feet (2795 x 62 m). It has a full-length offset taxiway at approximately 5.8 degrees off the runway heading, leading to dispersal and underground facilities. Where a squadron of IL-28 Russian jet bombers are based. The airfield is built over or near an emergency airfield constructed by the U.S. military during the Battle of Chosin Reservoir.
