= Lake Changjin =

Lake in North Korea

Chosin Reservoir
- 장진호 (Korean)
- Location within North Korea
- Location: Changjin County, North Korea
- Coordinates: 40°29′54″N 127°12′07″E
- Type: Lake

- Lake Changjin
- Hangul: 장진호
- Hanja: 長津湖
- RR: Jangjinho
- MR: Changjinho

Lake Changjin (Korean: 장진호), known widely in the West as Chosin Reservoir (Japanese: 長津湖), is a lake located in Changjin County, North Korea. It is most famously known for being the site of the Battle of the Chosin Reservoir, which was an important battle in the Korean War.

== Geography ==
Lake Changjin is an artificial lake created by the building of a dam on the Changjin River. Water is diverted to the Heuknim Stream, a tributary of the Seongcheon River, to operate the Changjin River Power Plant. It is known as the source of the Taedong River, which flows south to Pyongyang.

In the lower reaches of the Changjin River there is another power plant with an artificial lake, Langrim Lake, which is also called the second Changjin Lake.

== History ==
The Battle of the Chosin Reservoir took place about a month after the People's Republic of China entered the Korean War and sent the People's Volunteer Army (PVA) 9th Army (Note: In Chinese military nomenclature, the term "army" (军) means corps, while the term "army group" (集团军) means army.) to infiltrate the northeastern part of North Korea. On 27 November 1950, the Chinese force surprised the US X Corps commanded by Major General Edward Almond at the Chosin Reservoir area. A brutal 17-day battle in freezing weather soon followed. Between 27 November and 13 December, 30,000 United Nations Command troops (later nicknamed "The Chosin Few") under the field command of Major General Oliver P. Smith were encircled and attacked by about 120,000 Chinese troops under the command of Song Shilun, who had been ordered by Mao Zedong to destroy the UN forces. The UN forces were nevertheless able to break out of the encirclement and to make a fighting withdrawal to the port of Hungnam, inflicting heavy casualties on the Chinese. The retreat of the US Eighth Army from northwest Korea in the aftermath of the Battle of the Ch'ongch'on River and the evacuation of the X Corps from the port of Hungnam in northeast Korea marked the complete withdrawal of UN troops from North Korea.

== Notes ==
Footnotes

Citations
