= Jinchang (disambiguation) =

Jinchang (金昌) is a prefecture-level city in Gansu, China.

Jinchang or Jin Chang or variant may also refer to:

== Places ==
- Jinchang District (金阊区), former district of Suzhou, Jiangsu, China
- Jinchang Commandery (晉昌郡), historical division established in the Jin dynasty

== People ==
=== Given name "Jin" surnamed "Chang" ===
- Chang Jin (Chinese: 常进; born 1966). Chinese astronomer
- Jang Jin (장진, 張鎭; born 1971; a.k.a. Chang Jin), a South Korean film director

== See also ==
- Changjin (disambiguation)
- Chang (disambiguation)
- Jin (disambiguation)
