= Oliver P. Smith =

United States Marine Corps general

Oliver Prince Smith
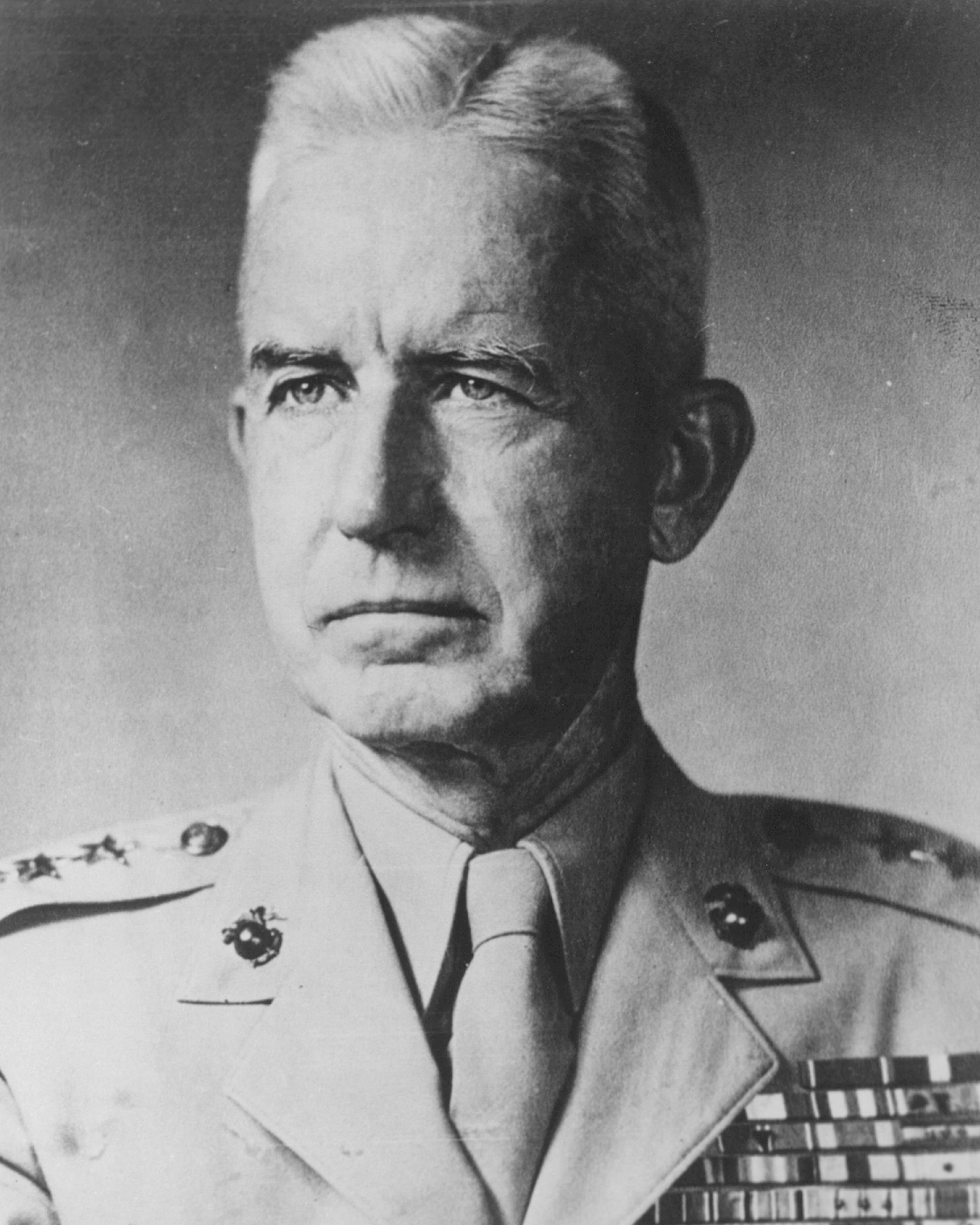
- Born: October 26, 1893; Menard, Texas, U.S.
- Died: December 25, 1977 (aged 84); Los Altos, California, U.S.
- Burial place: Golden Gate National Cemetery
- Spouse: Esther Laurilla King Smith
- Military career
- Allegiance: United States
- Branch: United States Marine Corps
- Service years: 1917–1955
- Rank: General
- Nicknames: "O.P.", "the professor", "student general"
- Commands: Fleet Marine Force, Atlantic; Camp Pendleton; Assistant Commandant USMC; 1st Marine Division; 5th Marine Regiment; 1st Battalion, 6th Marines
- Conflicts: Banana Wars; Haitian intervention; World War II; Invasion of Iceland; Battle of Cape Gloucester; Battle of Peleliu; Battle of Okinawa; Korean War; Battle of Inchon; Second Battle of Seoul; Battle of Chosin Reservoir; Battles of Wonju
- Awards: Distinguished Service Cross; Navy Distinguished Service Medal; Army Distinguished Service Medal; Silver Star; Legion of Merit (2); Bronze Star Medal; Air Medal; Eulji Order of Military Merit (2)

Oliver Prince Smith (October 26, 1893 – December 25, 1977) was a U.S. Marine four-star general and decorated combat veteran of World War II and the Korean War. He is most noted for commanding the 1st Marine Division during the first year of the Korean War, and notably during the Battle of Chosin Reservoir, where he said "Retreat, Hell! We're just attacking in another direction." This is commonly misquoted as "Retreat, hell! We're not retreating, we're just advancing in a different direction." He retired at the rank of four-star general, being advanced in rank for having been specially commended for heroism in combat.

== Military career ==
=== Early years ===
Smith was born in Menard, Texas. His father died when he was seven, and his mother moved to Northern California. He graduated from Santa Cruz High School in 1911. He attended the University of California, Berkeley, working his way through college doing odd jobs (mostly gardening). After graduation, he reported for active duty as a second lieutenant in the Marine Corps in 1917. Smith was a quiet, shy Christian Scientist.

The following month he was assigned his first overseas tour at Guam, Marianas Islands, where he served with the Marine Barracks, Naval Station. While in Guam, (then) Lieutenant Smith was married to Esther Laurilla King of Hayward, California. They remained married for 58 years. In May 1919, he returned to the United States for duty with the Marine barracks at Mare Island, California.

Ordered to sea duty in October 1921, Lieutenant Smith served as commanding officer of the Marine Detachment aboard the USS Texas (BB-35) until May 1924. At that time he was assigned to Marine Corps Headquarters, Washington, D.C., for duty with the personnel section.

Returning overseas in June 1928, he joined the Gendarmerie of Haiti, Port-au-Prince, as assistant chief of staff. Following his return from foreign shore duty in June 1931, he became a student at the Field Officer's Course, U.S. Army Infantry School, Fort Benning, Georgia. Graduating in June 1932, he was ordered to duty at the Marine Corps Schools, Quantico, Virginia, as an instructor in the Company Officers' Course. In September 1933, he was named assistant operations officer of the 7th Marine Regiment at Quantico.

Smith sailed for France in January 1934, where he joined the staff of the American Embassy in Paris for duty with the Office of the U.S. Naval Attaché. From November 1934 to July 1936, while in Paris, he became the first Marine Corps officer to matriculate at the Ecole Supérieure de Guerre.

He returned to the United States in August 1936, and joined the staff of the Marine Corps Schools at Quantico, as an instructor in the S-3 Section, (Operations and Training). He acquired the nickname "the professor," gained a reputation as an intellectual during these years and was recognized as an expert on amphibious warfare.

Smith was transferred to the West Coast in July 1939, where he joined the Fleet Marine Force as operations officer at the Marine Corps Base, San Diego, California.

In June of the following year, he became commanding officer of the 1st Battalion, 6th Marines, and in May 1941, sailed with the 6th Marine Regiment for Iceland where he remained until returning to the United States in March 1942.

=== World War II ===
In May 1942, Smith was ordered to Headquarters Marine Corps, Washington, D.C., where he became executive officer of the Division of Plans and Policies. He remained in this capacity until January 1944, when he joined the 1st Marine Division on New Britain. There he took command of the 5th Marine Regiment and subsequently led the regiment in the Talasea phase of the Cape Gloucester operation.

In April 1944, he was named assistant division commander of the 1st Marine Division and participated in operations against the Japanese in the Peleliu operation during September and October 1944.

Smith became Marine deputy chief of staff of the Tenth Army in November 1944, and participated in the Battle of Okinawa from April through June 1945.

In July 1945, he returned to the United States and became commandant of the Marine Corps Schools, Quantico, and in January 1948, was named commanding general, Marine Barracks, Quantico, in addition to his duties at the school. Three months later, he became assistant commandant of the Marine Corps and chief of staff, Headquarters Marine Corps, Washington, D.C. While there he served as editor-in-chief of the professional journal of U.S. Marines, the Marine Corps Gazette.

=== Korean War ===
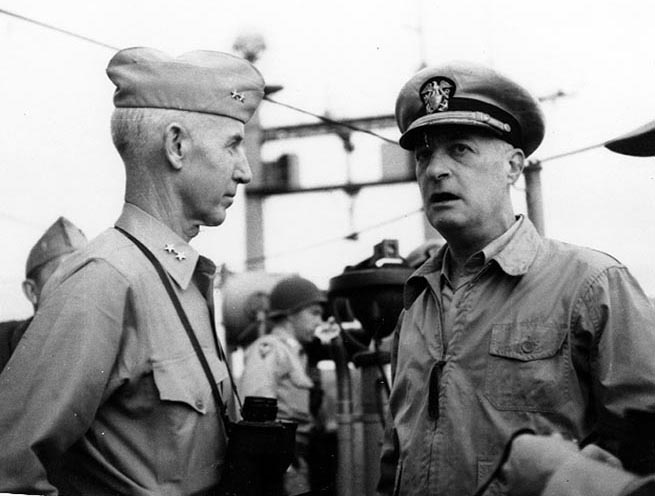
Major General O. P. Smith (left) and Vice Admiral James H. Doyle, USN, confer on board USS Mount McKinley (AGC-7), immediately prior to the Inchon Invasion.

Named Commanding General of the 1st Marine Division in June 1950, Major General Smith led his division through the bitter campaigns of the Korean War – from the late summer assault at Inchon, to the sub-zero winter drive north to the Chosin Reservoir.

In October 1950, the 1st Marine Division landed at Wonsan on the eastern side of Korea under the command of the Army's X Corps commanded by Edward Almond. Almond and Smith shared a mutual loathing dating back to a meeting between the two in Japan before the Inchon landing. During the meeting Almond had spoken of how easy amphibious landings were although he had never planned, or taken part in one, and then referred to Smith as son although he was only 10 months older than Smith. Smith and the Marine command also felt Almond was too aggressive and were sure about large numbers of Chinese Forces in North Korea when higher headquarters in Tokyo was telling them that was not the case. Although ordered to go north to the Yalu River as fast as he could, Smith continuously slowed the division's march to the point of near insubordination. Also along the way he established supply points and an airfield.

In November 1950, with the 1st Marine Division surrounded at the Chosin Reservoir, he directed the breakout and subsequent 70 miles (110 km) march to the seaport of Hungnam. In the end his careful march north and ability to keep the division together saved it—and quite possibly the entire X Corps—from total destruction. Smith later directed that Army units, later assessed to be essential in 1st Marine Division's successful retreat, be removed from paperwork awarding the Presidential Unit Citation.

General Smith returned to the United States, in May 1951, and was assigned duties as commanding general, Marine Corps Base Camp Pendleton, California.

In July 1953, he was advanced to the rank of lieutenant general and assumed his final duties as commanding general, Fleet Marine Force, Atlantic, and served in this capacity until his retirement, with the rank of general, on September 1, 1955.

Smith died in Los Altos, California on December 25, 1977.

== Awards ==

1st Row	Distinguished Service Cross		Navy Distinguished Service Medal	Army Distinguished Service Medal
2nd Row	Silver Star	Legion of Merit with Combat "V" & Gold award star	Bronze Star with Combat "V"	Air Medal
3rd Row	Navy Presidential Unit Citation with three award stars	Navy Unit Commendation	Marine Corps Expeditionary Medal	World War I Victory Medal
4th Row	American Defense Service Medal with Base clasp	American Campaign Medal	European–African–Middle Eastern Campaign Medal	Asiatic–Pacific Campaign Medal with three 3/16 inch service stars
5th Row	World War II Victory Medal	National Defense Service Medal	Korean Service Medal with silver 3/16 inch service star	Haitian Distinguished Service Medal with Diploma
6th Row	Order of Orange-Nassau, Grade Commander	Order of National Security Merit, Tong-il Medal with Silver star	Korean Presidential Unit Citation	United Nations Korea Medal

=== Distinguished Service Cross citation ===
Citation:

The President of the United States of America, under the provisions of the Act of Congress approved July 9, 1918, takes pleasure in presenting the Distinguished Service Cross to Major General Oliver P. Smith (MCSN: 0–920), United States Marine Corps, for extraordinary heroism in connection with military operations against an armed enemy of the United Nations while serving as Commanding General, FIRST Marine Division (Reinforced), in action against enemy aggressor forces in the vicinity of the Chosin Reservoir, Korea, from 29 November to 4 December 1950. Major General Smith's leadership contributed materially to the break-through in the Chosin Reservoir area and is in keeping with the highest traditions of the military service.

=== Silver Star citation ===
Citation:

The President of the United States of America, authorized by Act of Congress July 9, 1918, takes pleasure in presenting the Silver Star (Army Award) to Major General Oliver P. Smith (MCSN: 0–920), United States Marine Corps, for conspicuous gallantry and intrepidity in action as Commanding General, FIRST Marine Division (Reinforced), United Nations Command, in action against enemy aggressor forces in the Inchon-Seoul operation during the period 15 September to 21 September 1950. His actions contributed materially to the success of this operation and were in keeping with the highest traditions of the military service.
