= Battle of Chosin Reservoir =

1950 Korean War battle

- Part of the Second Phase Offensive of the Korean War
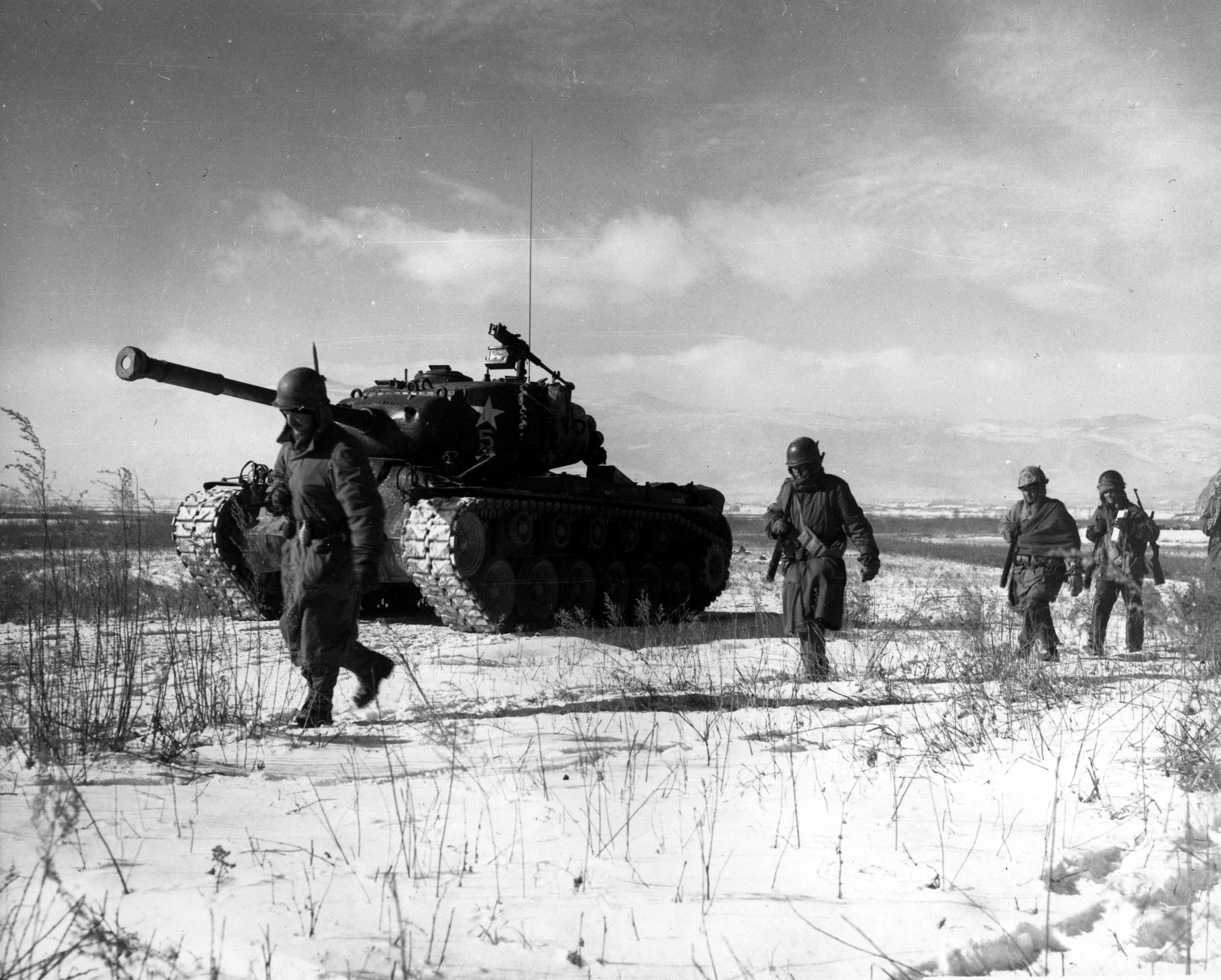
- A column of the US 1st Marine Division moves through Chinese lines during its breakout from the Chosin Reservoir with a M26 Pershing medium tank.
Date	27 November – 13 December 1950
Location	Chosin Reservoir, in present-day Changjin County, South Hamgyong Province, North Korea 40.37°N 127.26°E
Result	See § Aftermath
Territorial changes	Chinese forces recover northeastern Korea; UN withdraw to and evacuate from Hungnam.

Belligerents
United Nations (UNC): United States; United Kingdom; South Korea	China

Commanders and leaders
Douglas MacArthur; Edward Almond; Oliver P. Smith	(China) Song Shilun; (China) Zhang Renchu

Units involved
See order of battle	See order of battle

Strength
~30,000	~120,000

Casualties and losses
US estimate: 1,029 killed; 4,894 missing; 4,582 wounded; 7,338 non-battle casualties (Note: The 1st Marine Division reported 604 killed, 114 dead of wounds, 192 missing, 3,485 wounded and 7,338 non-battle casualties. However, US X Corps disputed the number by only recording 393 killed, 2,152 wounded and 76 missing for the 1st Marine Division. This number is calculated by inserting the 1st Marine Division's casualty data into the X Corps' total casualty report. See Appleman 1990, pp. 345–347 and Montross & Canzona 1992, pp. 381–382.); 15 tank losses; Chinese estimate: 13,900 casualties	Chinese estimate: 7,304 killed; 14,062 wounded; 30,732 non-battle casualties; UN estimate: 29,800 battle casualties; 20,000+ non-battle casualties; Unofficial estimates: ~60,000 casualties (Note: This number is the total number of replacements requested by the 9th Army to reconstitute itself, which includes units that were not involved the fighting. See Roe 2000, p. 394.)
- Location within Korea

The Battle of Chosin Reservoir, also known as the Chosin Reservoir Campaign or the Battle of Lake Changjin (Korean: 장진호 전투; Hanja: 長津湖戰鬪; MR: Changjinho chŏnt'u), was a battle in the Korean War. (Note: "The difference between a very serious reverse and a total disaster was a near thing. The most crucial battle was in the northeast, at Chosin." See Roe 2000, p. 411) The name "Chosin" is derived from the Japanese pronunciation "Chōshin", instead of the Korean pronunciation. (Note: This was the Japanese name for the reservoir. The name is written as "長津" in Chinese characters (note that most Korean proper names, be it people or places, are transliterations from the same name written in Chinese characters (Hanmun) ), and "長津" is pronounced "Chang Jin" in both Chinese and Korean, while it is pronounced "Cho Shin" in Japanese. It has nothing to do with the erroneous suggestion that the name derives from the name of the Chosun (朝鮮) Dynasty.)

The battle took place about a month after the People's Republic of China entered the conflict and sent the 9th Corps of the People's Volunteer Army (PVA) (Note: In Chinese military nomenclature, the term "army" (军) means corps and the term "army group" (集团军) means army.) to infiltrate the northeastern part of North Korea. On 27 November 1950, the Chinese force surprised the US X Corps commanded by Major General Edward Almond in the Chosin Reservoir area. Between 27 November and 13 December, 30,000 United Nations Command troops, later nicknamed "The Chosin Few", under the field command of Major General Oliver P. Smith were encircled and attacked by about 120,000 Chinese troops under the command of Song Shilun, who had been ordered by Mao Zedong to destroy the UN forces.

In the ensuing 17-day battle in freezing weather that followed, the UN forces were able to break out of the encirclement and withdraw to the port of Hungnam in what U.S. historians described as the "greatest evacuation movement by sea in U.S. military history". Both sides suffered severe casualties, with battle casualties and non-battle casualties caused by the frigid weather. The withdrawal of the US Eighth Army from northwest Korea and its recovery by Chinese forces in the aftermath of the Battle of the Ch'ongch'on River and the evacuation of the X Corps from the port of Hungnam in northeast Korea marked the withdrawal of UN troops from North Korea.

== Background ==
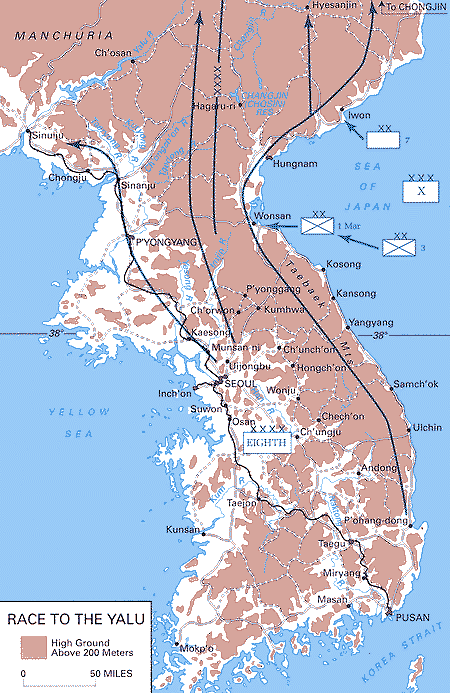
A map of UN advances toward the Yalu River

By mid-October 1950, after the successful landing at Inchon by the US X Corps, the Eighth Army breakout from the Pusan Perimeter and the subsequent pursuit and destruction of the Korean People's Army (KPA), the Korean War appeared to be all but over. United Nations (UN) forces advanced rapidly into North Korea with the intention of reuniting North and South Korea before the end of 1950. North Korea is divided down the middle by the impassable Taebaek Mountains, which separated the UN forces into two groups. The US Eighth Army advanced north through the western coast of the Korean Peninsula, while the Republic of Korea (ROK) I Corps and the US X Corps advanced north on the eastern coast.

At the same time the People's Republic of China entered the conflict after issuing several warnings to the United Nations. On 19 October 1950, large formations of Chinese troops, dubbed the People's Volunteer Army (PVA), secretly crossed the border and into North Korea. One of the first Chinese units to reach the Chosin Reservoir area was the PVA 42nd Army, which was to stop the eastern UN advances. On 25 October, the advancing ROK I Corps made contact with the Chinese and halted at Funchilin Pass (40.204°N 127.3°E), south of the Chosin Reservoir.

After the landing at Wonsan, the US 1st Marine Division of X Corps engaged the defending PVA 124th Division on 2 November; the battle causing severe casualties to the Chinese. On 6 November, the PVA 42nd Corps ordered a retreat to the north with the intention of luring the UN forces to the Chosin Reservoir. By 24 November, the 1st Marine Division occupied both Sinhung-ni (Note: The town of Sinhung-ni referred to in this article should not be confused with another identically named town located at south of Yudami-ni on the west side of Chosin Reservoir. See Appleman 1990, pp. 30, 32, 221, 376.) (40.557°N 127.27°E) on the eastern side of the reservoir and Yudami-ni (40.48°N 127.112°E) on the west side.

Faced with the sudden attacks by Chinese forces in the Eighth Army sector, General Douglas MacArthur ordered the Eighth Army to launch the Home-by-Christmas Offensive. To support the offensive, MacArthur ordered X Corps to attack west from the Chosin Reservoir and to cut the vital Manpojin—Kanggye—Huichon supply line. Major General Edward M. Almond, commander of the US X Corps, formulated a plan on 21 November. It called for the US 1st Marine Division to advance west through Yudami-ni, while the US 7th Infantry Division would provide a regimental combat team to protect the right flank at Sinhung-ni. The US 3rd Infantry Division would also protect the left flank, while providing security in the rear area. By then the X Corps was stretched thin along a 400 mi (640 km) front.

Surprised by the Marine landing at Wonsan, Chinese Communist Party chairman Mao Zedong called for the immediate destruction of the ROK Capital Division, ROK 3rd Infantry Division, US 1st Marine Division, and US 7th Infantry Division in a telegram to Commander Song Shilun of the 9th Corps, PVA, on 31 October. (Note: The Chinese military did not have military ranks during the 1950s.) Under Mao's urgent orders, the 9th Corps was rushed into North Korea on 10 November. Undetected by UN intelligence, it entered the Chosin Reservoir area on 17 November, with the 20th Army of the 9th Corps relieving the 42nd Army near Yudami-ni.

== Prelude ==
=== Location, terrain and weather ===
Chosin Reservoir is a man-made lake located in the northeast of the Korean peninsula. The name Chosin is the Japanese pronunciation of the Korean place name Changjin, and the name stuck due to the outdated Japanese maps used by UN forces. The battle's main focus was around the 78-mile-long (126 km) road that connects Hungnam and Chosin Reservoir, which served as the only retreat route for the UN forces. Through these roads, Yudami-ni and Sinhung-ni, located at the west and east side of the reservoir respectively, are connected at Hagaru-ri (now Changjin-ŭp) (40.3838°N 127.249°E). From there, the road passes through Koto-ri (40.284°N 127.3°E) and eventually leads to the port of Hungnam. The area around the Chosin Reservoir was sparsely populated.

The battle was fought over some of the roughest terrain during some of the harshest winter weather conditions of the Korean War. The road was created by cutting through the hilly terrain of Korea, with steep climbs and drops. Dominant peaks, such as the Funchilin Pass and the Toktong Pass (40.3938°N 127.161°E), overlook the entire length of the road. The road's quality was poor, and in some places it was reduced to a one-lane gravel trail. On 14 November 1950, a cold front from Siberia descended over the Chosin Reservoir, and the temperature plunged, according to estimates, to as low as −36 °F (−38 °C). The cold weather created considerable danger of frostbite casualties and was accompanied by frozen ground, icy roads, and weapon malfunctions. Medical supplies froze; morphine syrettes had to be defrosted in a medic's mouth before they could be injected; blood plasma was frozen and useless on the battlefield. Even cutting off clothing to deal with a wound risked gangrene and frostbite. Batteries used for the Jeeps and radios did not function properly in the temperature and quickly ran down. The lubrication in the guns gelled and rendered them useless in battle. Likewise, the springs on the firing pins would not strike hard enough to fire the round, or would jam.

=== Forces and strategies ===
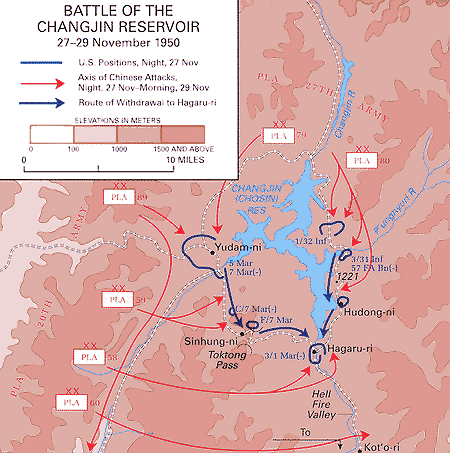
A map of the battle

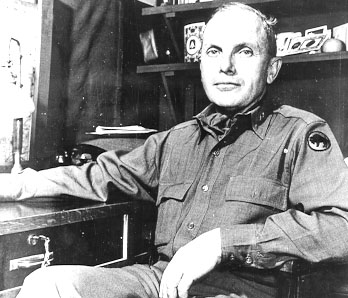
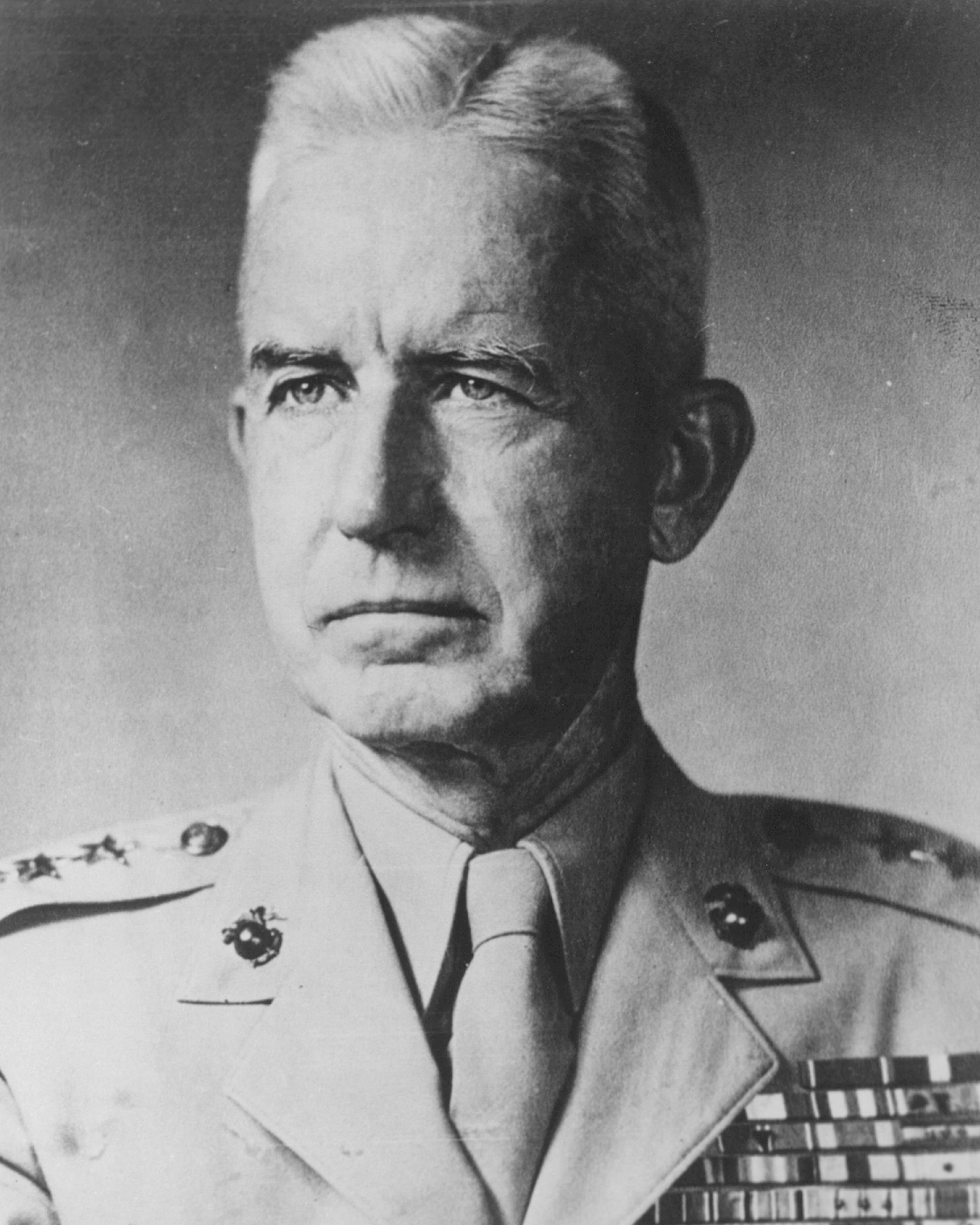
Major General Edward Almond (seated), commander of the US X Corps, and Major General Oliver P. Smith, commander of the US 1st Marine Division.

Although the 1st Marine Division landed at Wonsan as part of Almond's US X Corps, Almond and Major General Oliver P. Smith of the 1st Marine Division shared a mutual loathing of each other that dated back to a meeting before the landing at Inchon, when Almond had spoken of how easy amphibious landings are even though he had never been involved in one. Smith believed there were large numbers of Chinese forces in North Korea despite the fact that higher headquarters in Tokyo said otherwise, but Almond felt Smith was overly cautious. The mutual distrust between the commanders caused Smith to slow the 1st Marine Division's advance towards the Chosin Reservoir in violation of Almond's instructions. Smith established supply points and airfields along the way at Hagaru-ri and Koto-ri.

As the US X Corps was pushing towards the reservoir, the Chinese formulated their strategy, based on their experiences in the Chinese Civil War. Working from the assumption that only a light UN presence would be at the reservoir, the Chinese 9th Corps was first to destroy the UN garrisons at Yudami-ni and Sinhung-ni, then push towards Hagaru-ri. Believing the bulk of the US X Corps would move to rescue the destroyed units, the 9th Corps would then block and trap the main UN forces on the road between Hagaru-ri and Hungnam. The 9th Corps initially committed eight divisions for the battle, with most of the forces concentrated at Yudami-ni and Sinhung-ni.

The flaw in the Chinese plan was a lack of accurate intelligence about the UN forces. Even though the US X Corps was stretched thin over northeast Korea, the slow Marine advance allowed the bulk of the US 1st Marine Division, including the 5th, 7th and 11th Marines, to be concentrated at Yudami-ni. Furthermore, the strategically important Hagaru-ri, where a C-47-capable airfield was under construction and a supply dump, was not a priority for the Chinese despite being lightly defended by the 1st and 7th Marines. Only Regimental Combat Team 31 (RCT-31), an understrength and hastily formed regimental combat team of the US 7th Infantry Division, was thinly spread along the eastern bank of the reservoir. RTC-31 relieved the 5th Marines which had previously been on the east reservoir with 1st Battalion, 32nd Infantry arriving in the afternoon of November 25th, while 3rd Battalion, 31st Infantry and the 57th Field Artillery battalion only arrived late in the afternoon on November 27th. Those units later took the brunt of the Chinese assaults.

As for the UN forces, the 1st Marine Division had an effective strength of 25,473 men at the start of the battle, and it was further reinforced by the British Royal Marines unit 41 (Independent) Commando and the equivalent of two regiments from the 3rd and 7th Army Infantry Divisions. The UN forces had a combined strength of about 30,000 men during the course of the battle. The UN forces at Chosin were also supported by one of the greatest concentrations of air power during the Korean War, since the 1st Marine Aircraft Wing stationed at Yonpo Airfield and five aircraft carriers from the US Navy's Task Force 77 were able to launch 230 sorties daily to provide close air support during the battle, while the US Air Force Far East Combat Cargo Command in Japan reached the capacity of airdropping 250 tons of supplies per day to resupply the trapped UN forces.

Although the 9th Corps was one of China's elite formations, composed of veterans and former POWs from the Huaihai Campaign, several deficiencies hampered its ability during the battle. Initially the 9th Corps was intended to be outfitted in Manchuria during November, but Mao suddenly ordered it into Korea before that could happen. As a result, the 9th Corps had almost no winter clothing for the harsh Korean winter. Similarly, poor logistics forced the 9th Corps to abandon heavy artillery, while working with little food and ammunition. The food shortage forced the 9th Corps to initially station a third of its strength away from the Chosin Reservoir in reserve, and starvation and exposure weakened the Chinese units, since foraging was not an option in the sparsely populated area. By the end of the battle, more Chinese troops had died from the cold than from combat and air raids.

Chinese strength is usually estimated at 120,000 troops for the battle. Before arriving in Korea, the 9th Corps was also reinforced. Each of its three corps had four divisions instead of the regular three; thus it had 12 divisions, with 10,000 men per division. Infantry from two formerly "liberated" (surrendered) Nationalist divisions were absorbed to bring each infantry company up to strength. Some companies had approximately 150 men, while others were reinforced with more than 200 men. However, attrition due to UN air raids, poor logistics and cold weather had also taken a toll on the way to the battlefield. On the day 9th Corps entered Korea, for example, frostbite inflicted 700 casualties, while most of its transport vehicles were destroyed by UN air raids. During the course of the battle, Chinese prisoners of war reported that most of the 9th Corps' divisions had become under strength, numbering about 6,500 to 7,000 men per division. These factors, plus uncertainties over the Chinese order of battle in Western sources, (Note: "The third uncommitted division of the IX Army Group was the 90th, of the 27th Army. It may have been had in reserve somewhere in the Chosin area but never committed, or if elements of it were committed, they were never identified." See Appleman 1987, p. 353) led some historians to revise Chinese numbers down to as low as 60,000 during the course of battle.

Eventually, all 12 Chinese divisions of the 9th Corps were deployed, although the 78th and the 88th Divisions of the PVA 26th Army did not make contact with UN forces during the course of the battle. Eight divisions of the PVA 20th and 27th Armies served as the main attacking force. Four divisions of the PVA 26th Army initially were held back in reserve, and deployed after 20th and 27th Armies had exhausted all their available strength.

== Battle ==
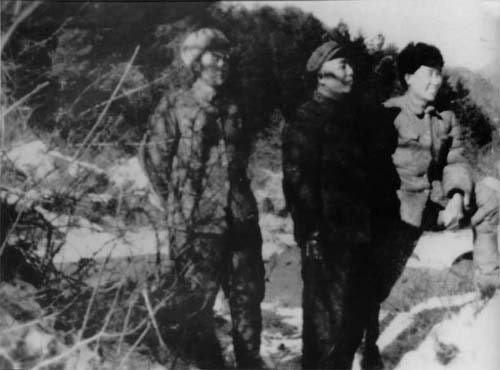
Song Shilun (middle), commander of the People's Volunteer Army 9th Corps at Chosin Reservoir

On the night of 27 November, the PVA 20th and 27th Armies of the 9th Corps launched multiple attacks and ambushes along the road between the Chosin Reservoir and Kot'o-ri. At Yudam-ni, the 5th, 7th and 11th Marines were surrounded and attacked by the PVA 79th and 89th Divisions, with the 59th Division attacking the road between Yudam-ni and Hagaru-ri to cut off communication. Similarly, RCT-31 was isolated and ambushed at Sinhung-ni by the PVA 80th and 81st Divisions. At Hagaru-ri, the 1st Marine Division command headquarters was targeted by the PVA 58th Division. Finally, the PVA 60th Division surrounded elements of the 1st Marines at Kot'o-ri from the north. Caught by complete surprise, the UN forces were cut off at Yudam-ni, Sinhung-ni, Hagaru-ri and Kot'o-ri by 28 November.

=== Actions at Yudam-ni ===
Soldiers from the Chinese 79th Division moving to engage the Marines at Yudam-ni

Acting on Almond's order, Smith ordered the 5th Marines to attack west toward Mupyong-ni on 27 November. The attack was soon stalled by the PVA 89th Division, forcing the Marines to dig in on the ridges surrounding Yudam-ni. As night came, three Chinese regiments of the 79th Division attacked the ridges on the north and northwest of Yudam-ni, hoping to annihilate the garrison in one stroke. Close quarters fighting soon developed as the attackers infiltrated Marine positions, but the 5th and 7th Marines held the line while inflicting heavy casualties on the Chinese. As day broke on 28 November, the Chinese and Americans were locked in a stalemate around the Yudam-ni perimeter.

While the battle was underway at Yudam-ni, the PVA 59th Division blocked the road between Yudam-ni and Hagaru-ri by attacking the defending Charlie and Fox Companies of the 7th Marines. The successful assault forced Charlie Company to retreat into Yudam-ni, which left Fox Company, commanded by Captain William E. Barber, isolated on a hill overlooking the Toktong Pass, a vital pass that controlled the road. On 29 November, several efforts by the 7th Marines failed to rescue Fox Company, despite inflicting heavy casualties on the Chinese. Aided by artillery from Hagaru-ri and Marine Corsair fighters, Fox Company managed to hold out for five days while enduring constant attacks by the PVA 59th Division.

After the heavy losses suffered by the PVA 79th Division at Yudam-ni, 9th Corps headquarters realized that the bulk of the 1st Marine Division was stationed at Yudam-ni, with a garrison strength double the initial estimate. Believing that any further assaults would be futile, Song Shilun ordered the 9th Corps to switch their main attacks toward Sinhung-ni and Hagaru-ri, leaving Yudam-ni alone from 28 to 30 November. At the same time, the US Eighth Army on the Korean western front was forced into full retreat at the Battle of the Ch'ongch'on River, and MacArthur ordered Almond to withdraw the US X Corps to the port of Hungnam. Acting on Almond and Smith's instructions, Lieutenant Colonel Raymond L. Murray and Colonel Homer L. Litzenberg, commanders of the 5th and 7th Marines, respectively, issued a joint order to break out from Yudam-ni to Hagaru-ri on 30 November. Faced with tough fighting between the blocking Chinese divisions and the withdrawing Marines, Smith remarked: "Retreat, hell! We're not retreating, we're just advancing in a different direction."

For the breakout, the Marines formed into a convoy with a single M4A3 Sherman tank in the lead. The plan was to have 3rd Battalion, 5th Marines (3/5) as the vanguard of the convoy, with three battalions covering the rear. At the same time, 1st Battalion, 7th Marines (1/7) would attack towards Fox Company in order to open the road at Toktong Pass. To start the breakout, 3rd Battalion, 7th Marines (3/7) had to first attack south and capture Hills 1542 and 1419 in order to cover the road from Chinese attacks. The breakout was carried out under the air cover of the 1st Marine Air Wing.

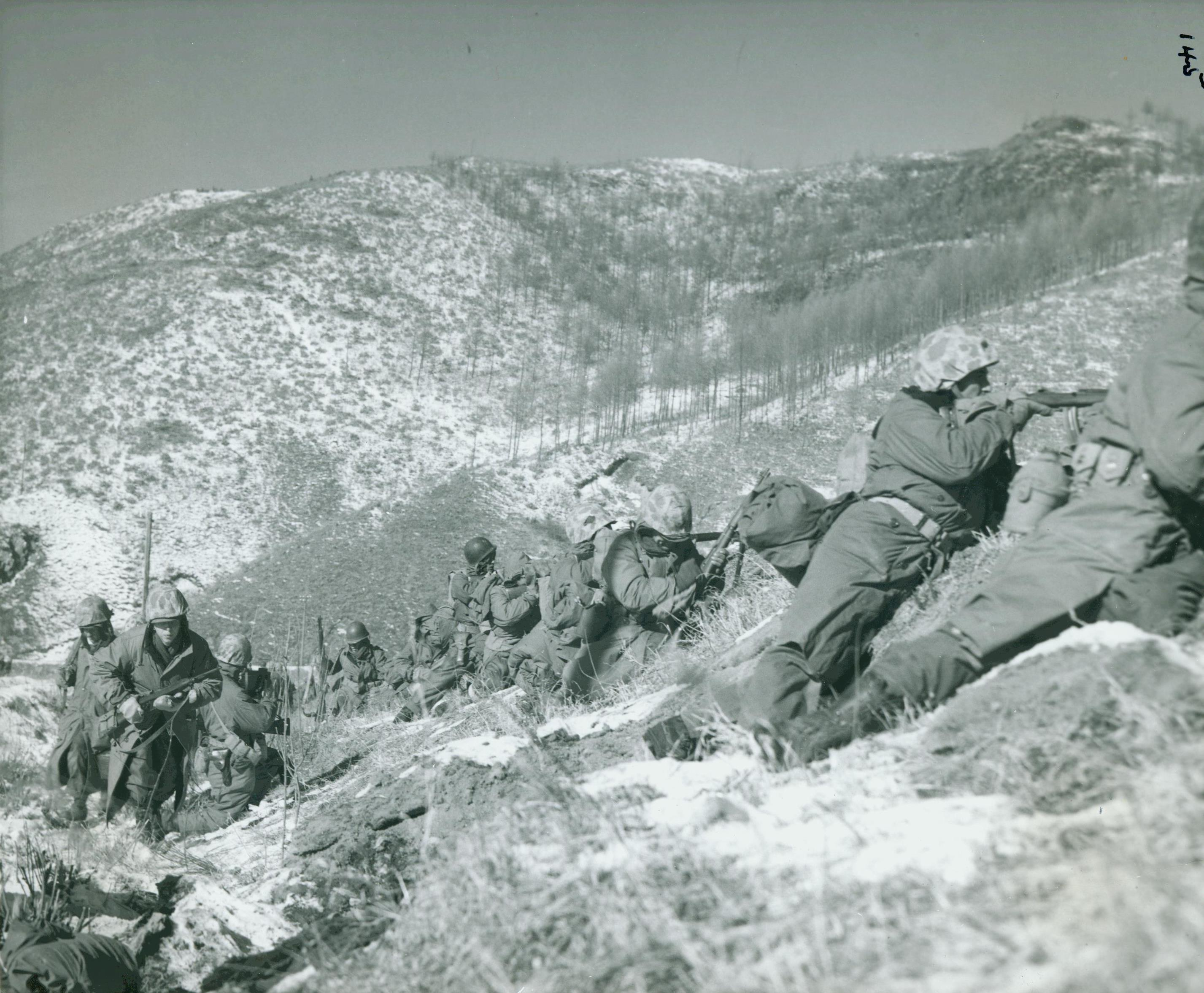
Marines engaging the Chinese

On the morning of 1 December, 3/7 Marines engaged the PVA 175th Regiment of the 59th Division at Hills 1542 (40.435°N 127.107°E) and 1419 (40.428°N 127.135°E). The Chinese defenders soon forced the Marines to dig in on the slopes between the road and the peaks when the convoy passed 3/7's position by the afternoon. With Hagaru-ri still not captured, the PVA High Command scrambled the 79th Division to resume attacks on Yudam-ni, while the 89th Division rushed south towards Kot'o-ri. The Chinese struck at night, and the ferocity of the fighting forced the rear covering forces to call in night fighters to suppress the attacks. The fighting lasted well into the morning of 2 December until all the Marines had managed to withdraw from Yudam-ni.

At the same time, 1/7 Marines also tried to break the Chinese blockade at Hill 1419 on 1 December. Despite being badly reduced by combat, hunger and frostbite, the PVA 59th Division sent in its last five platoons and refused to yield. As night approached, 1/7 finally captured the peak and started to march through the hills on the east side of the road. Relying on the element of surprise, they managed to destroy several Chinese positions along the road. On the morning of 2 December, a joint attack by Fox Company and 1/7 secured the Toktong Pass, thus opening the road between Yudam-ni and Hagaru-ri.

Although the road had been opened between Yudam-ni and Hagaru-ri, the convoy still had to fight through the numerous Chinese positions on the hills overlooking the road. On the first night of the retreat, the Chinese struck the convoy in force and inflicted heavy casualties on 3/5 Marines. Although strong air cover suppressed most of the Chinese forces for the rest of the march, the cold weather, harassing fire, raiding parties, and roadblocks slowed the retreat to a crawl, while inflicting numerous casualties. Despite those difficulties, the convoy reached Hagaru-ri in an orderly fashion on the afternoon of 3 December, with the withdrawal completed on 4 December.

=== East of the reservoir ===
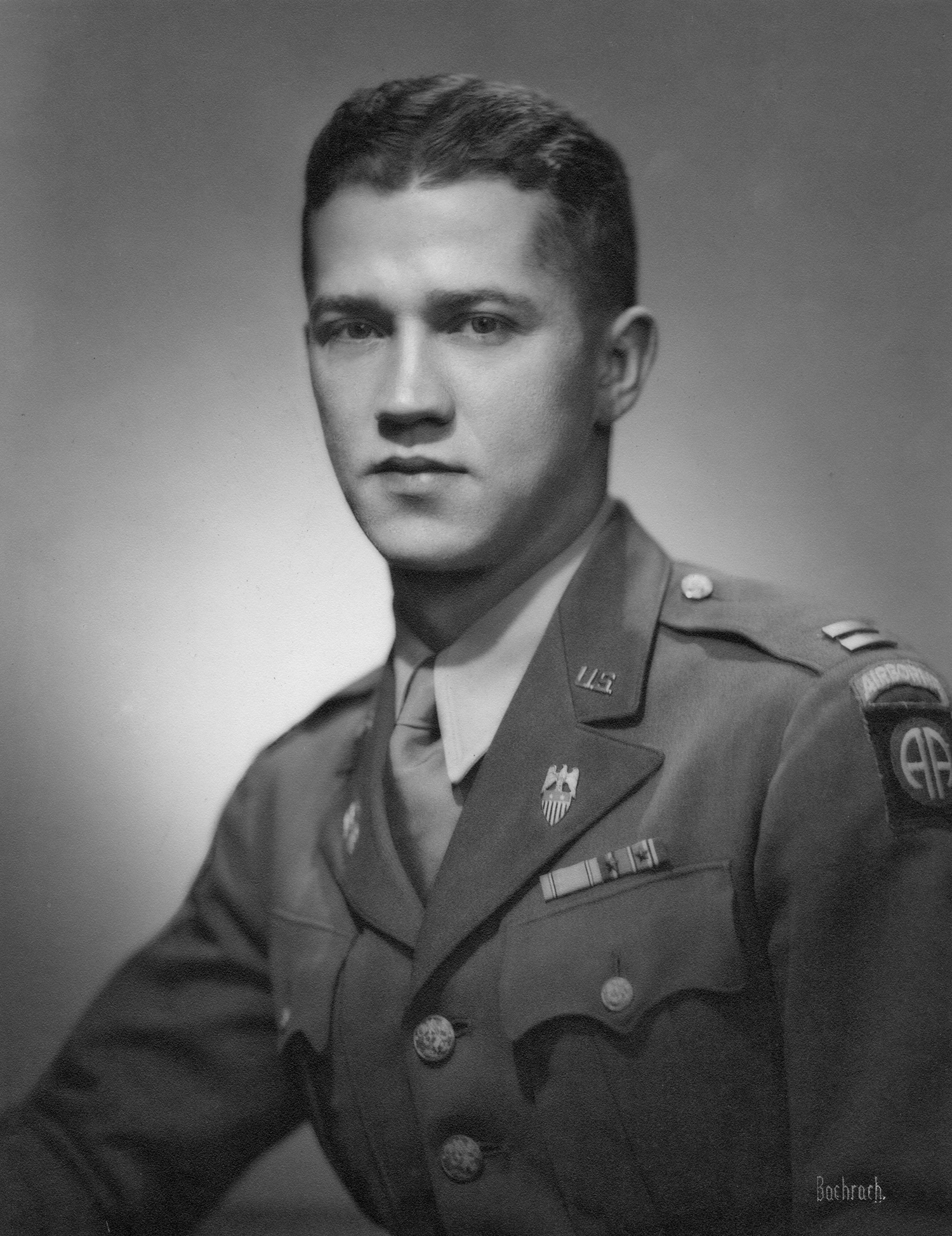
Lieutenant Colonel Don Carlos Faith Jr.

RCT-31, later known as "Task Force Faith" was a hastily formed regimental combat team from the 7th Infantry Division that guarded the right flank of the Marine advance towards Mupyong-ni. Before the battle, RCT-31 was spread thin, with main elements separated on the hills north of Sinhung-ni, the Pyungnyuri Inlet west of Sinhung-ni, and the town of Hudong-ni (40.43°N 127.28°E) south of Sinhung-ni. Although the Chinese believed RCT-31 to be a reinforced regiment, the task force was actually understrength, with one battalion missing, due to the bulk of the 7th Infantry Division being scattered over northeast Korea. Furthermore, a large portion of RCT-31 was KATUSA soldiers, with the 1st Battalion, 32nd Infantry having around 300 KATUSAs from a total strength of around 1,200. These KATUSAs had been hastily drafted, poorly trained, and very few of them spoke English. When the 7th Infantry Division had deployed to Korea, roughly one out of three soldiers was a KATUSA.

On the night of 27 November, three regiments from the 80th Division attacked the northern hills (40.489°N 127.259°E) and the inlet, completely surprising the defenders. The 1st Battalion, 32nd Infantry, to the north of Sinhung-ni suffered heavy casualties, while the 57th Field Artillery Battalion and the 3rd Battalion, 31st Infantry, were almost overrun at Pyungnyuri Inlet. Losses, including among officers, were severe with the commanders of both the 57th Field Artillery Battalion and the 3rd, Battalion, 31st Infantry being wounded. The Chinese also sent the 242nd Regiment of the 81st Division towards Hill 1221, (40.449°N 127.268°E), an undefended hill that controlled the road between Sinhung-ni and Hudong-ni. As the night's fighting ended, RCT-31 was split into three elements.

Believing that the defenders had been completely destroyed at the inlet, the Chinese stopped their attacks and proceeded to loot the American positions for food and clothing. As morning came on 28 November, the 3/31st Infantry counterattacked the PVA 239th Regiment at the inlet, driving the surprised Chinese back in a complete rout. In the afternoon, Almond flew into the Sinhung-ni perimeter of RCT-31, convinced that RCT-31 was strong enough to begin its attack north and deal with whatever "remnants" of Chinese forces were in their way. Almond ordered Colonel Allan D. Maclean, the commander of RCT-31, to resume the offensive north, while awarding the Silver Star to Lieutenant Colonel Don C. Faith Jr., the commander of the 1/32nd Infantry, and asking him to select two other soldiers to award the Silver Star to. Faith selected Lieutenant Everett C. Smalley, a wounded platoon leader and Sergeant George A. Stanley a mess sergeant in Headquarters company, largely because they were both nearby at the time. After Almond left, Faith took his Silver Star medal off and threw it into the snow.

Chinese troops assaulting Task Force Faith's position at Sinhung-ni

On the night of 28 November, the PVA 80th Division attacked again with four regiments. At the inlet, the Chinese assault became a disaster as communications broke down, while devastating fire from the M16 and M19 anti-aircraft (AA) guns attached to the 57th Field Artillery Battalion swept the Chinese ranks. (Note: RCT-31's anti-aircraft guns were from D Battery, 15th Antiaircraft Battalion, which was attached to the 57th Field Artillery Battalion during the entire battle. See Appleman 1990, p. 82.) In the aftermath, the PVA 238th and the 239th Regiment together had fewer than 600 soldiers. The attacks by PVA 240th Regiment, on the other hand, forced Maclean to order a retreat from the northern hills towards Sinhung-ni. On 29 November, the 1st Battalion managed to break through the Chinese blockade and reached the Sinhung-ni perimeter, but Maclean was lost when he mistook some Chinese soldiers for American and went onto the ice by himself to greet them. (Note: Maclean's final fate is disputed between US and Chinese sources. Although both sides agreed that Maclean was shot numerous times while running towards the Chinese soldiers, Chinese sources claim that Maclean was shot dead on the spot, while UN POWs stated that Maclean later died from his wounds while being moved to a POW camp. See Appleman 1990, p. 114 and Guang 2007, p. 60.) The Chinese finally stopped their attacks on the night of 29 November, while waiting for fresh reinforcements.

While RCT-31 was under siege, Almond finally instructed the 1st Marine Division to rescue it by breaking out of Yudam-ni, an impossible order for Smith to implement. Only the 31st Tank Company tried to rescue RCT-31, by attacking Hill 1221 from Hudong-ni, but without infantry support, the two armored attacks on 28 and 29 November were stalled by slippery roads, rough terrain, and close infantry assaults. By 30 November, the US forces evacuated Hudong-ni in order to defend Hagaru-ri, leaving the rest of RCT-31 completely isolated. Furthermore, RCT-31 did not have reliable communications with higher headquarters or the Marines on the western side of the reservoir due to issues with unreliable radios.

On 30 November, Major General David G. Barr, the commander of the 7th Infantry Division, flew into Sinhung-ni and met with Faith, who by now had assumed command of RCT-31. Faith laid out the difficulties of a breakout, particularly the 500 wounded that RCT-31 had to bring along. On the same day, parts of the PVA 94th Division (Note: Misidentified as the 90th Division by UN intelligence. See Guang 2007, p. 118.) and the rest of the 81st Division arrived as reinforcements for the 80th Division. By midnight, six Chinese regiments renewed their attacks, and Zhan Danan, the commander of the 80th Division, ordered the complete destruction of RCT-31 before dawn. Again, the 57th Battalion's AA guns held the Chinese at bay, but supplies of shells were desperately low. On the day of 1 December, Faith finally ordered RCT-31 to break out from Sinhung-ni and withdraw to Hagaru-ri.

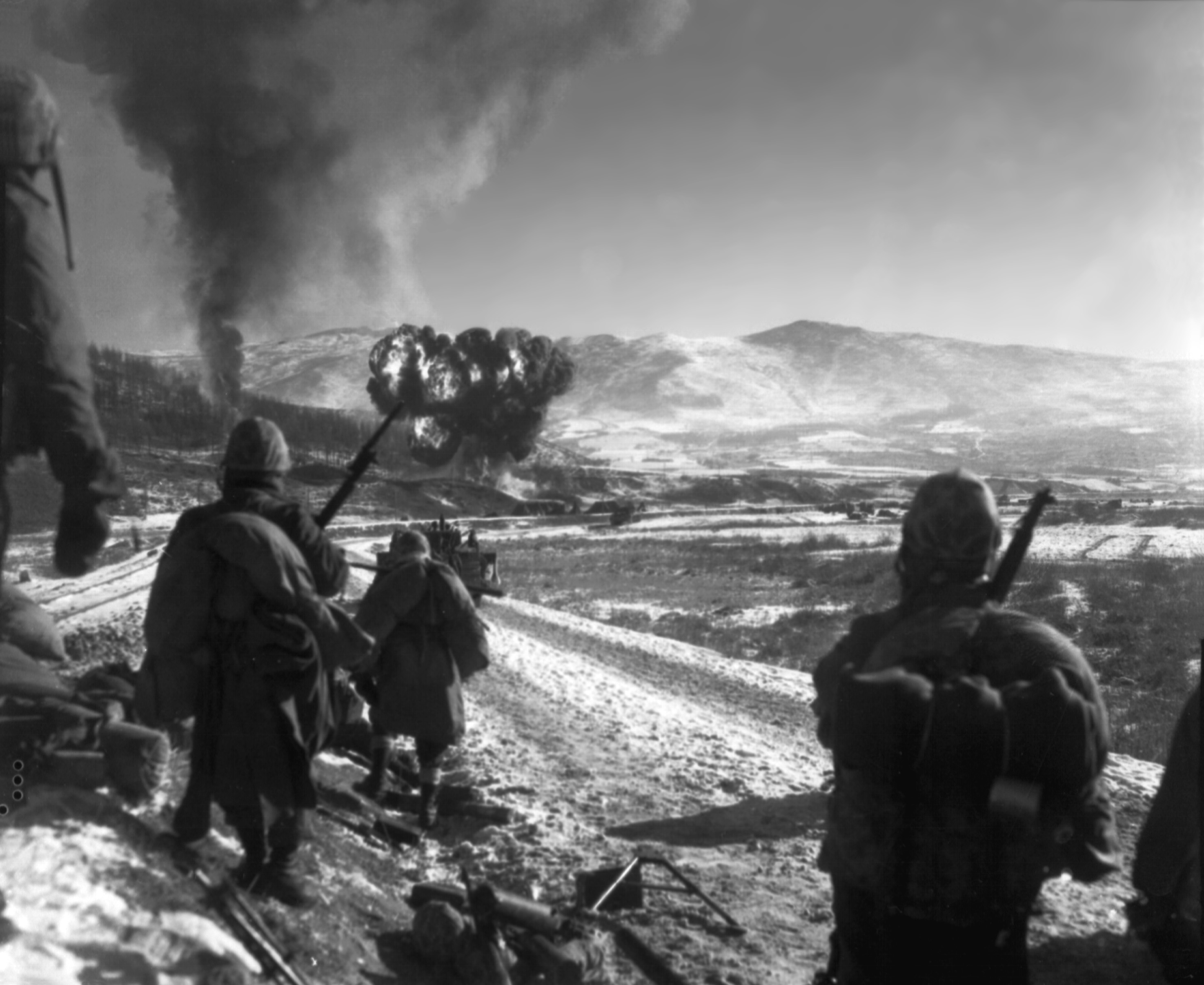
Marines watch F4U Corsairs drop napalm on Chinese positions.

The breakout began as soon as the weather allowed the 1st Marine Aircraft Wing to provide air cover on 1 December. As the soldiers formed a convoy and tried to leave the Sudong-ni perimeter, the PVA 241st Regiment immediately swarmed over the American forces, with three other regiments closing in. Left with no choice, the covering aircraft dropped napalm right in front of RCT-31, inflicting casualties on both American and Chinese troops. The resulting firestorm wiped out the blocking Chinese company, allowing the convoy to advance. As the front of RCT-31 made its way forward, heavy small arms fire caused many members of the rear guard to seek shelter below the road instead of protecting the trucks. Chinese fire also killed or wounded those already in the trucks as well as the drivers, who viewed the job as a form of suicide. Slowly, the convoy approached a roadblock under Hill 1221 in the late afternoon. Several parties tried to clear Hill 1221, but after taking part of the hill, the leaderless soldiers continued out onto the frozen reservoir instead of returning to the column. As Faith led an assault on the roadblock, he was hit by a Chinese grenade and subsequently died of his wounds. The convoy managed to fight past the first roadblock, but as it reached the second at Hudong-ni, RCT-31 disintegrated under Chinese attacks. Out of the original 2,500 soldiers, about 1,050 managed to reach Hagaru-ri, and only 385 survivors were deemed able-bodied. The remnants of RCT-31 were formed into a provisional army battalion for the rest of the battle.

=== Actions at Hagaru-ri ===
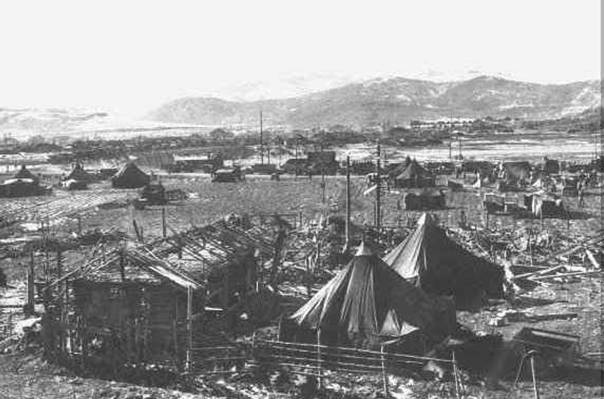
A Direct Air Support Center at Hagaru-ri

To support the Marine attack towards Mupyong-ni, Hagaru-ri became an important supply dump with an airfield under construction. Smith and 1st Marine Division headquarters were also located at Hagaru-ri. With the bulk of the 1st Marine Division gathered at Yudam-ni, Hagaru-ri was lightly defended by two battalions from the 1st and 7th Marines, the rest of the garrison being composed of engineers and rear support units from both the Army and the Marine Corps.

The original Chinese plan called for the 58th Division to attack Hagaru-ri on the night of 27 November, but the division became lost in the countryside due to the outdated Japanese maps it used. It was not until the dawn of 28 November that the 58th Division arrived at Hagaru-ri. Meanwhile, from the fighting and ambushes that had occurred the previous night, the garrison at Hagaru-ri noticed the Chinese forces around them. Lieutenant Colonel Thomas L. Ridge, commander of 3rd Battalion, 1st Marines (3/1), predicted the Chinese attack would come on the night of 28 November. Almost everyone, including rear support units with little combat training, was pressed into service on the front line due to the manpower shortage, and the entire perimeter was on full alert by 21:30.

It was not long before the PVA 173rd Regiment attacked the western and the southern perimeter, while the 172nd Regiment struck the hills on the northern perimeter. Despite the preparations, the understrength garrison was overwhelmed, with the Chinese opening several gaps in the defenses and reaching the rear areas. The resulting chaos, however, caused a breakdown in discipline among the Chinese soldiers, who began looting food and clothing instead of exploiting the situation. The defending Americans managed to destroy the Chinese forces in counterattacks, while a breakdown of communications between the Chinese regiments allowed the gaps to close. When the fighting stopped, the Chinese had only gained the East Hill (40.387°N 127.259°E) on the northern perimeter. Another attack was planned for the night of 29 November, but air raids by VMF-542 broke up the Chinese formations before it could be carried out.

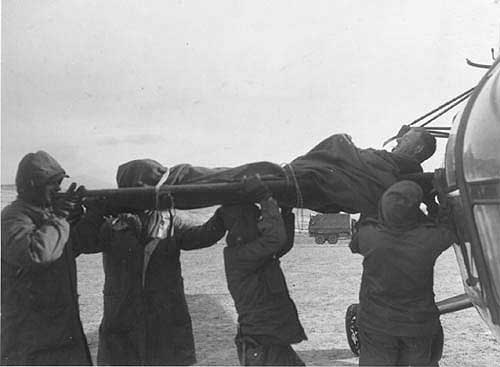
Wounded Marine being evacuated by a HO3S-1 helicopter from VMO-6

Given the critical manpower shortage at Hagaru-ri, on 29 November, Smith ordered Colonel Lewis "Chesty" Puller of the First Marine Regiment to assemble a task force to be sent north from Kot'o-ri to open the road south of Hagaru-ri. A task force was formed with 921 troops from 41 (Royal Marine) Commando, G Company of the 1st Marines and B Company of the 31st Infantry. It was dubbed "Task Force Drysdale" after its commander, Lieutenant Colonel Douglas B. Drysdale, who also commanded 41 Commando.

On the afternoon of 29 November, Task Force Drysdale pushed north from Koto-ri, while under constant attack from the PVA 60th Division. The task force's harrowing experience later earned the road the nickname "Hell Fire Valley". As the Chinese attacks dragged on, the task force became disorganized, and a destroyed truck in the convoy later split the task force into two segments. Although the lead segment fought its way into Hagaru-ri on the night of 29 November, the rear segment was destroyed. Despite suffering 162 dead and missing and 159 wounded, the task force managed to bring in 300 badly needed infantrymen for the defense at Hagaru-ri.

As more reinforcements arrived from Hudong-ni on 30 November, the garrisons attempted to recapture the East Hill. All efforts failed, despite the destruction of a Chinese company. When darkness settled, the PVA 58th Division gathered its remaining 1,500 soldiers in a last-ditch attempt to capture Hagaru-ri. The reinforced defenders annihilated most of the attacking forces, with only the defences around the East Hill giving way. As the Chinese tried to advance from the East Hill, they were cut down by the 31st Tank Company.

By 1 December, the PVA 58th Division was virtually destroyed, with the remainder waiting for reinforcements from the 26th Army of the 9th Corps. Much to the frustration of Song Shilun, the 26th Corps did not arrive before the Marines broke out of Yudam-ni. The airfield was opened to traffic on 1 December, allowing UN forces to bring in reinforcements and to evacuate the dead and wounded. With the Marines at Yudam-ni completing their withdrawal on 4 December, the trapped UN forces could finally start their breakout towards the port of Hungnam.

=== Breakout ===
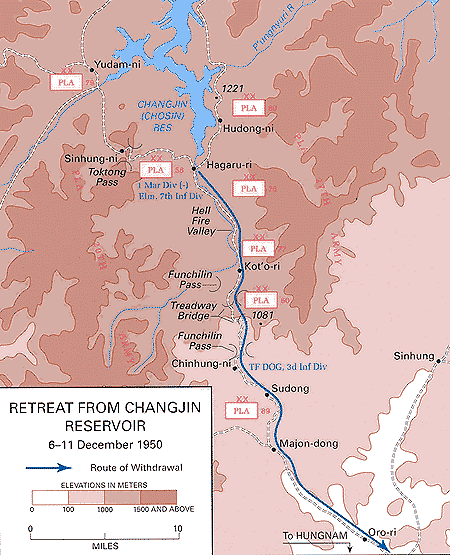
The retreat from the Changjin (Chosin) Reservoir

After a short rest, the breakout began on 6 December, with the 7th Marines as the vanguard of the retreating column, while the 5th Marines covered the rear. At the same time, the much-delayed PVA 26th Army arrived at Hagaru-ri with its 76th and 77th Divisions to relieve the 58th and 60th Divisions. As the 7th Marines pushed aside the PVA 76th Division south of Hagaru-ri, the 5th Marines took over the Hagaru-ri perimeter and recaptured the East Hill from the 76th Division. In a last effort to stop the breakout, the customary Chinese night attack was launched, with the 76th and 77th Division striking the Hagaru-ri perimeter from all directions. The Marines repulsed the attacks, inflicting heavy casualties.

Meanwhile, the 7th Marines opened the road between Hagaru-ri and Koto-ri by capturing the high ground surrounding the road. But as soon as the Marines pulled out, the 77th Division returned to the peaks and attacked the column. Chaotic fighting broke out and the retreat was slowed to a crawl. The Marine night fighters returned to subdue the Chinese forces, and most of the blocking troops were eliminated. On 7 December, the rest of the column managed to reach Kot'o-ri with little difficulty, with the last elements reaching Kot'o-ri that night.

After the failure of the 26th Corps at Hagaru-ri, the PVA High Command ordered the 26th and 27th Corps to chase the escaping UN force, with the 20th Corps assigned to block the escape route. But with most of the 20th Corps destroyed at Yudam-ni and Hagaru-ri, the only forces between Kot'o-ri and Hungnam were the remnants of the 58th and 60th Divisions. In desperation, Song Shilun ordered these troops to dig in at Funchilin Pass, while blowing up the vital bridge (40.232°N 127.296°E), hoping the terrain and obstacles would allow the 26th and 27th Corps to catch up with the retreating UN forces.

The PVA 180th Regiment that occupied Hill 1081 (40.233°N 127.326°E) blew up the original concrete bridge and two improvised replacements in succession, believing the bridge was rendered irreparable. In response, the 1st Battalion, 1st Marines (1/1) attacked Hill 1081 from the south, and the hill was captured on 9 December, though the defenders fought to the last man. At the same time, the 7th Marines and RCT-31 attacked the bridge from the north, only to encounter defenders who were already frozen in their foxholes.

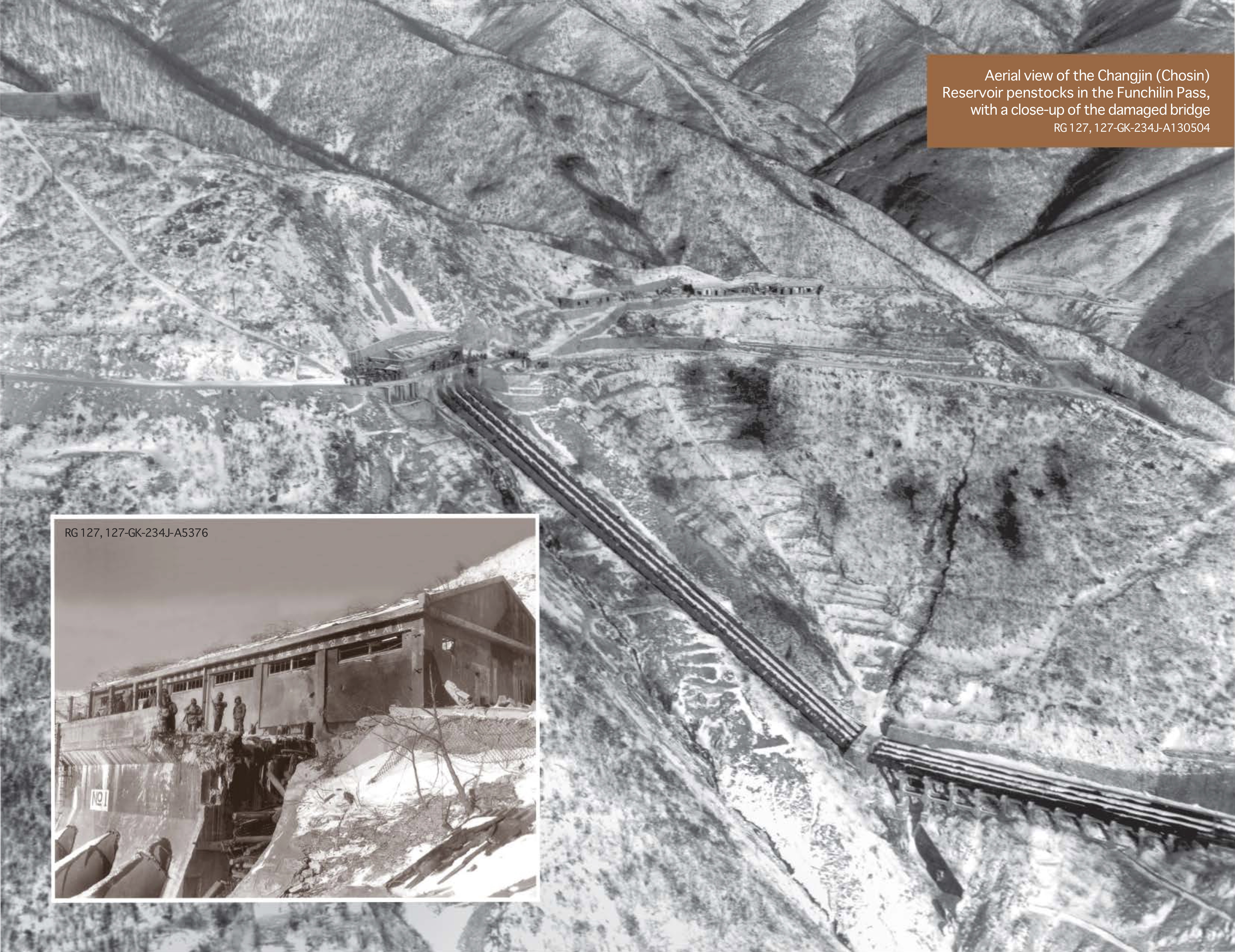
An aerial view of the Funchilin Pass, with a close-up of the blown bridge

With the path to Hungnam blocked at Funchilin Pass, eight C-119 Flying Boxcars flown by the US 314th Troop Carrier Wing were used to drop portable bridge sections by parachute. The bridge, consisting of eight separate 18 ft (5.5 m) long, 2,900 lb (1,300 kg) sections, was dropped one section at a time, using a 48 ft (15 m) parachute on each section. Four of these sections, together with additional wooden extensions were successfully reassembled into a replacement bridge by Marine Corps combat engineers and the US Army 58th Engineer Treadway Bridge Company on 9 December, enabling UN forces to proceed. Outmaneuvered, the PVA 58th and 60th Divisions still tried to slow the UN advance with ambushes and raids, but after weeks of non-stop fighting, the two Chinese divisions combined had only 200 soldiers left. The last UN forces left Funchilin Pass by 11 December.

One of the last engagements during the withdrawal was an ambush at Sudong (40.17°N 127.324°E) by the pursuing PVA 89th Division, which Task Force Dog of the 3rd Infantry Division repulsed with little difficulty. The trapped UN forces finally reached the Hungnam perimeter by 21:00 on 11 December.

== Evacuation at Hungnam ==
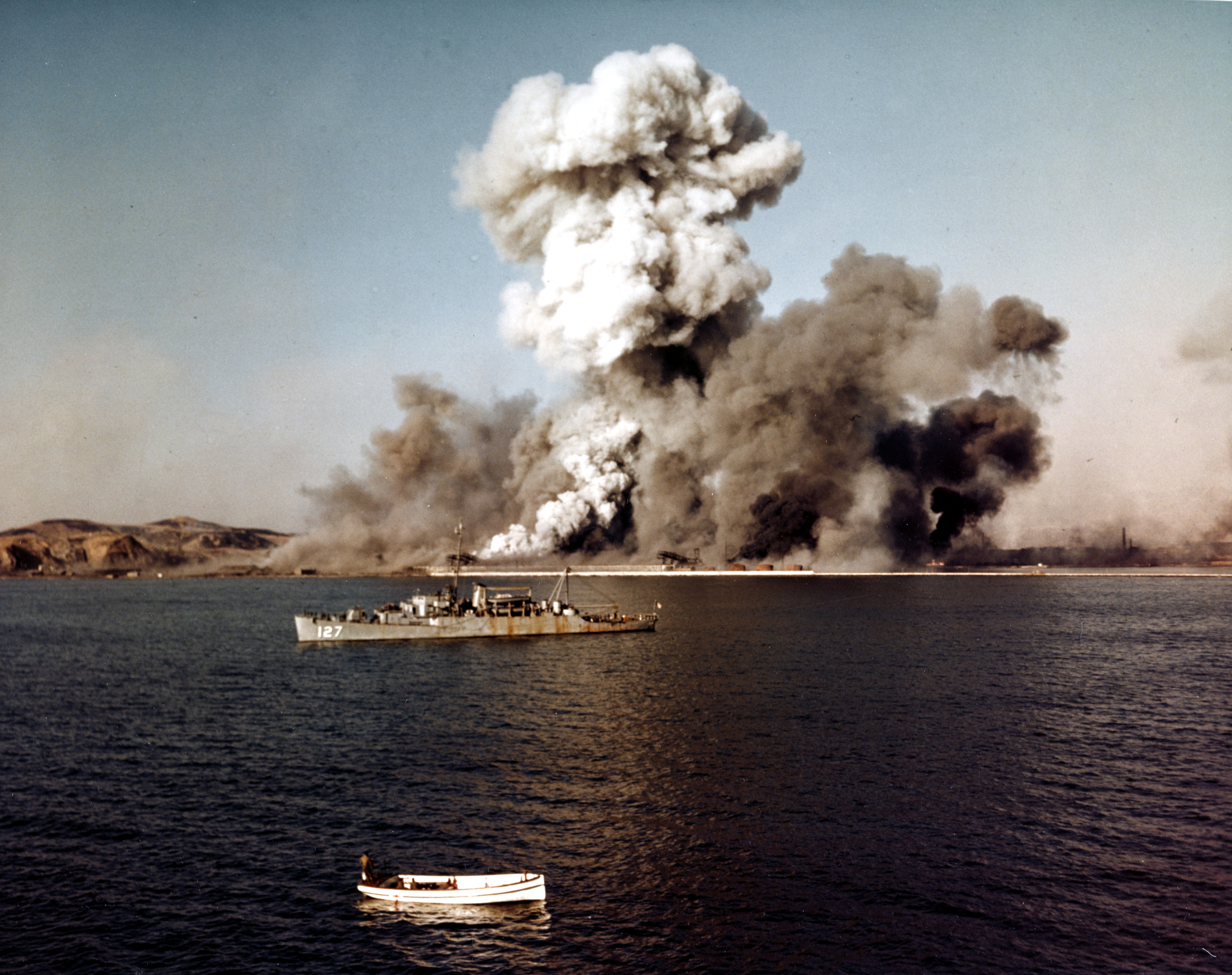
The high-speed transport USS Begor observes the destruction of Hungnam's port facilities on 24 December.

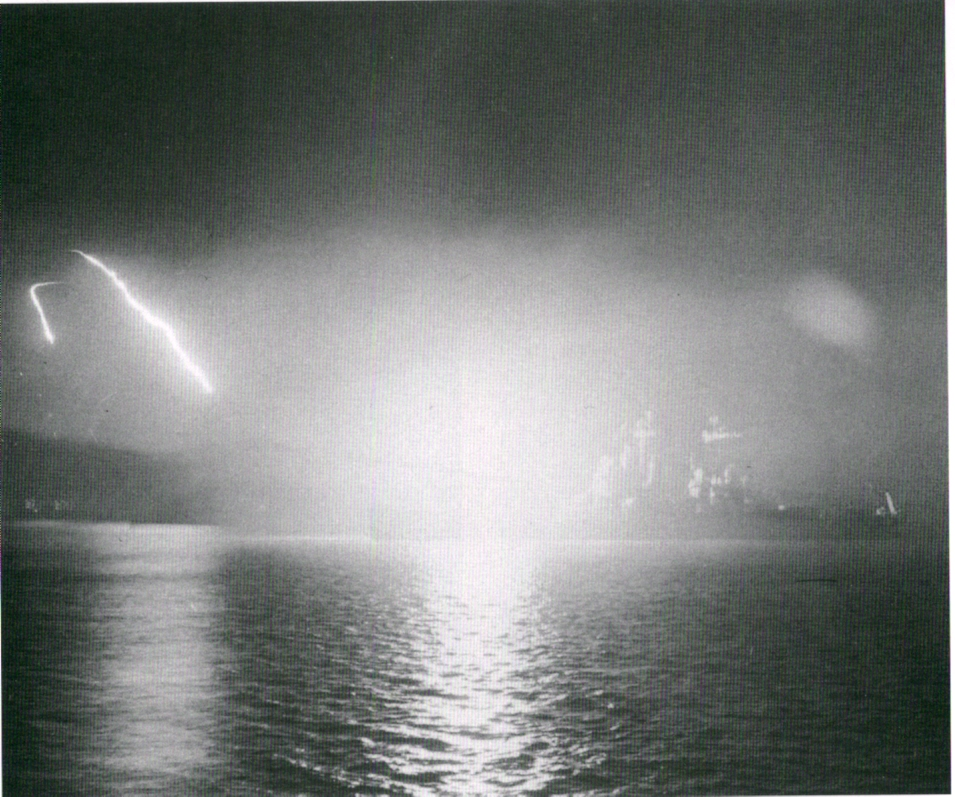
The heavy cruiser USS Saint Paul fires her 8-inch (203-mm) guns at Chinese troops threatening the evacuation.

By the time the UN forces arrived at Hungnam, MacArthur had already ordered the evacuation of the US X Corps on 8 December in order to reinforce the US Eighth Army, which by then was badly depleted and retreating rapidly towards the 38th parallel. Following his orders, the ROK I Corps, the ROK 1st Marine Regiment and the US 3rd and 7th Infantry Divisions had also set up defensive positions around the port. Some skirmishes broke out between the defending US 7th, 17th and 65th Infantry and the pursuing PVA 27th Corps, but against the strong naval gun fire support provided by US Navy Task Force 90, the badly mauled 9th Corps was in no shape to approach the Hungnam perimeter.

In what US historians called the "greatest evacuation movement by sea in US military history", a 193-ship armada assembled at the port and evacuated not only the UN troops, but also their heavy equipment and roughly a third of the Korean refugees. One Victory ship, the SS Meredith Victory, evacuated 14,000 refugees by herself, despite being designed to carry only 12 passengers. The last UN unit left at 14:36 on 24 December, and the port was destroyed to deny its use to the Chinese. The PVA 27th Army entered Hungnam on the morning of 25 December.

== Aftermath ==
=== Casualties ===
The US X Corps and the ROK I Corps reported a total of 10,495 battle casualties: 4,385 US Marines, 3,163 US Army personnel, 2,812 South Koreans attached to American formations and 78 British Royal Marines. The 1st Marine Division also reported 7,338 non-battle casualties due to the cold weather, adding up to a total of 17,833 casualties. Despite the losses, the US X Corps preserved much of its strength. About 105,000 soldiers, 98,000 civilians, 17,500 vehicles, and 350,000 tons of supplies were shipped from Hungnam to Pusan, and they later rejoined the war effort in Korea. Commanding General Smith was credited for saving the US X Corps from destruction, while the 1st Marine Division, 41 (Royal Marine) Commando and RCT-31 were awarded the Presidential Unit Citation for their tenacity during the battle. Fourteen Marines, two soldiers and one Navy pilot received the Medal of Honor, and all of the UN troops that served at Chosin were later nicknamed "The Chosin Few".

According to official estimates by the People's Liberation Army General Logistics Department published in 1988, the PVA 9th Corps suffered 21,366 combat casualties, including 7,304 killed. In addition, 30,732 non-combat casualties were attributed to the harsh Korean winter and lack of food. Total casualties thus amounted to 52,098 - more than one third of its total strength. Outside of official channels, the estimation of Chinese casualties has been described as high as 60,000 by Patrick C. Roe, the chairman of Chosin Few Historical Committee, citing the number of replacements requested by 9th Corps in the aftermath of the battle. Regardless of the varying estimates, historian Yan Xue of PLA National Defence University noted that the 9th Corps was put out of action for three months. With the absence of 9th Corps the Chinese order of battle in Korea was reduced to 18 infantry divisions by 31 December 1950, as opposed to the 30 infantry divisions present on 16 November 1950.

==== Operation Glory ====
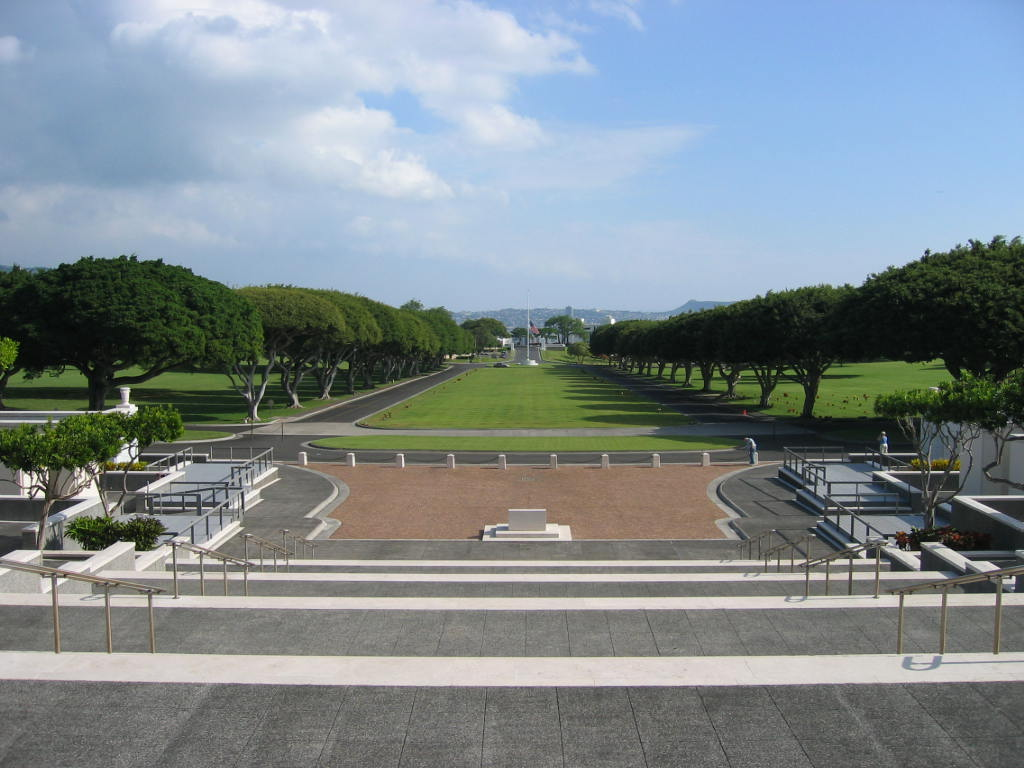
The National Memorial Cemetery of the Pacific where many of the UN war dead, which were exchanged under Operation Glory, are buried.

During the battle, UN dead were buried at temporary grave sites along the road. Operation Glory took place from July to November 1954, during which the dead of each side were exchanged. The remains of 4,167 US soldiers were exchanged for 13,528 North Korean and Chinese dead. In addition, 546 civilians who died in UN prisoner-of-war camps were turned over to the South Korean government. After Operation Glory, 416 Korean War "unknowns" were buried in the National Memorial Cemetery of the Pacific, the "Punchbowl Cemetery" in Honolulu, Hawaii. According to a Defense Prisoner of War/Missing Personnel Office (DPMO) white paper, 1,394 names were also transmitted from the Chinese and North Koreans during the operation, of which 858 proved to be correct.

The 4,167 returned remains were found to be 4,219 individuals, of whom 2,944 were found to be Americans, with all but 416 identified by name. Of the 239 Korean War unaccounted for, 186 are not associated with the Punchbowl Cemetery unknowns. (Note: 176 were identified and of the remaining 10 cases, four were non-Americans of Asiatic descent; one was British; three were identified and two cases unconfirmed. See "DPMO White Paper, Punch Bowl 239". Washington, D.C.: United States Department of Defense. Retrieved 2009-08-27.) From 1990 to 1994, North Korea excavated and returned more than 208 sets of remains, which possibly include 200 to 400 US servicemen, but very few have been identified due to the co-mingling of remains. From 2001 to 2005, more remains were recovered from the Chosin Battle site, and around 220 were recovered near the Chinese border between 1996 and 2006.

=== Outcome assessment ===
Roy E. Appleman, the author of US Army official history South to Naktong, North to Yalu, writes that both sides could claim victory: the PVA 9th Corps ultimately held the battlefield, while X Corps held off the PVA 9th Corps in a series of battles that enabled it to withdraw most of its forces as an effective tactical unit. Writing for National Public Radio, Anthony Kuhn said that both sides have remembered the battle in "starkly differing" ways: for the United States, it won because its forces broke out of their encirclement largely intact and "inflicted heavy losses on the Chinese" while for China, it won because it "drove a vastly technologically superior foe from the battlefield, and eventually forced it to sign an armistice agreement some three years later." Allan R. Millett qualifies his assessment of the battle as a Chinese "geographic victory" in that they ejected X Corps from North Korea with the PVA's tactical failure of achieving their stated objective of destroying the 1st Marine Division, adding that the campaign gave the UN confidence that it could withstand the superior numbers of the Chinese forces. The official Chinese history, published by PLA Academy of Military Science, states that despite the heavy casualties, the PVA 9th Corps had earned its victory by successfully protecting the eastern flank of Chinese forces in Korea, while inflicting over 10,000 casualties to the UN forces.

Eliot A. Cohen writes that the retreat from Chosin was a UN victory which inflicted such heavy losses on the PVA 9th Corps that it was put out of action until March 1951. Paul M. Edwards, founder of the Center for the Study of the Korean War, draws parallels between the battle at Chosin and the Dunkirk evacuation. He writes that the retreat from Chosin following a "massive strategic victory" by the Chinese has been represented as "a moment of heroic history" for the UN forces. Appleman, on the other hand, questioned the necessity of a sea-borne evacuation to preserve the UN forces, asserting that X Corps had the strength to break out of the Chinese encirclement at Hungnam at the end of the battle. Chinese historian Li Xiaobing acknowledges X Corps' successful withdrawal from North Korea, and writes that the Battle of Chosin "has become a part of Marine lore, but it was still a retreat, not a victory." Bruce Cumings simply refers to the battle as a "terrible defeat" for the Americans.

Patrick C. Roe, who served as an intelligence officer with the 7th Marine Regiment at Chosin, asserts that X Corps directly allowed the Eighth Army to hold the south (Note: "Loss of the 1st Marine Division would have resulted in the loss of a substantial portion of X Corps. Instead, X Corps was withdrawn intact, while inflicting such damage upon the twelve divisions of the 9th Army that they were out of action until the last days of March. With the reinforcement by X Corps, and with the absence of nearly 40% of total Chinese strength, the Eighth Army was able to hold the south." See Roe 2000, pp. 411–2) and quoted MacArthur in corroborating his view. (Note: "General MacArthur agreed that this was the decisive battle. In commenting on a study by the Marine Corps Board, he wrote: "The Marine Corps Board of Study rightfully points out that the campaign of the 1st Marine Division with attached Army elements in North Korea was 'largely responsible for preventing reinforcement of CCF forces on Eighth Army front by 12 divisions during a period when such reinforcement might have meant to Eighth Army the difference between maintaining a foothold in Korea or forced evacuation therefrom.'...""See Roe 2000, p. 412) Yu Bin, a historian and a former member of the Chinese People's Liberation Army, states that while the destruction of Task Force Faith (Note: Yu Bin states that it was the 32nd Regiment of the 7th Infantry Division that was destroyed, reflecting the Chinese mis-identification of the composition of Task Force Faith.) was viewed as the single greatest Chinese victory of the war, ultimately the PVA 9th Corps had become "a giant hospital" while failing to destroy the numerically inferior UN forces at Chosin as planned. Zhang Renchu, whose 26th Army was blamed for allowing the X Corps to escape, had threatened suicide over the outcome, while Song Shilun offered to resign his post.

The battle exacerbated inter-service hostility, the Marines blaming the US Army and its leadership for the failure. The collapse of the army units fighting on the east of the reservoir was regarded as shameful, and for many years afterwards their role in the battle was largely ignored. Later studies concluded that Task Force MacLean/Faith had held off for five days a significantly larger force than previously thought and that their stand was a significant factor in the Marines' survival. This was eventually recognized in September 1999 when, for its actions at Chosin, Task Force Faith was awarded the Presidential Unit Citation, an award that General Smith blocked when it was first proposed in 1952.

The Marines evacuated from North Korea and spent January and most of February 1951 rebuilding in the relatively secure South Korea, where they destroyed the well-respected but already weakened North Korean 10th Division in counter-guerrilla operations during the Second Battle of Wonju. The Marines returned to regular and heavy action on 21 February in Operation Killer.

=== Wider effect on the war ===
The battle ended the UN force's expectation of total victory, including the capture of North Korea and the reunification of the peninsula. By the end of 1950, PVA/KPA forces had recaptured North Korea and pushed UN forces back south of the 38th parallel. Serious consideration was given to the evacuation of all US forces from the Korean peninsula and US military leaders made secret contingency plans to do so. The disregard by Far Eastern Command under MacArthur of the initial warnings and diplomatic hints by the PVA almost led the entire UN army to disaster at Ch'ongch'on River and Chosin Reservoir and only after the formation and stabilization of a coherent UN defensive line under Lieutenant General Matthew Ridgway did the "period of headlong retreats from an attacking, unsuspected foe" cease.

On the other hand, the battle affected the PVA in two ways, both of which had the result of helping the UN Command to secure its position in South Korea, while losing North Korea. First, according to historian Shu Guang Zhang, PVA commanders were persuaded by their victories at Chosin and Ch'ongch'on that they could "defeat American armed forces", and this led to "unrealistic expectations that the CPV [PVA] would work miracles." Second, the heavy casualties caused by sub-zero temperatures and combat, plus poor logistical support weakened the PVA's eight elite divisions of the 20th and 27th Corps. Of those eight divisions, two were forced to disband. With the absence of 12 out of 30 of Chinese divisions in Korea in early 1951, Roe says that the heavy Chinese losses at Chosin enabled the UN forces to maintain a foothold in Korea.

=== Request for nuclear weapons ===
By the end of the withdrawal, the Chinese troops had advanced and retaken almost all of North Korean territories. On 24 December 1950, MacArthur submitted a list of "retardation targets" in Korea, Manchuria and other parts of China, and requested 34 atomic bombs from Washington with the purpose of sowing a belt of radioactive cobalt to prevent further Chinese advances. His request was firmly declined and led to his later dismissal.

== Legacy ==
The Battle of Chosin Reservoir is regarded by some historians as the most brutal in American history due to violence, casualty rate, weather conditions, and endurance. Over the course of fourteen days, 17 Medals of Honor (Army and Navy) and 78 Service Cross Medals (Army and Navy) were awarded by the United States, the second most as of 2020 after the Battle of the Bulge (20 MOHs and 83 SCMs).

American veterans of the battle are colloquially referred to as the "Chosin Few" and symbolized by the "Star of Koto-ri".

Namesakes and memorials

- Unknown year, a street in Bayonne, NJ was named Chosin Few Way.
- Unknown year, "Chosin" nickname and "Against All Odds" motto, 32nd Infantry Regiment
- Unknown year, Battle of Chosin Reservoir Memorial, Veterans Memorial Park (Lawrence, Indiana)
- Unknown year, Chosin Reservoir Campaign Memorial (Ogden, Utah)
- 1989, Chosin Few Memorial, Forest Park (St. Louis, Missouri)
- 1991, USS Chosin
- 1999, "The March Out of the Chosin", Oak Ridge Cemetery (Springfield, Illinois)
- 2010, Chosin Few Memorial, Marine Corps Base Camp Pendleton (Oceanside, California)
- 2012, Mount Chosin Few is a summit in the Chugach Mountains in the Chugach National Forest of Alaska, United States. The peak was named in 2012 by the United States Board on Geographic Names after local and state efforts to rename the peak.
- 2017, The Chosin Few Monument, Semper Fidelis Memorial Park, National Museum of the Marine Corps (Triangle, Virginia)
- 2017, Chosin Few Memorial Highway, 40-mile portion of Route 35 (Monmouth County, New Jersey)

== Films and documentaries ==
- With the Marines: Chosin to Hungnam - US Navy MN-7314 (1951)
- This Is Korea (1951)
- Retreat, Hell! (1952)
- Hold Back the Night (1956)
- Ode to My Father (국제시장) (2014)
- Against the Odds, Bloody George at the Chosin Reservoir (2015)
- Year Hare Affair, Season 1 Episode 3 (那年那兔那些事儿) (2015)
- American Experience: The Battle of Chosin (2016)
- The Battle at Lake Changjin (2021)
- The Battle at Lake Changjin II (2022)
- Devotion (2022)

== See also ==
- History of the United States Army
- History of the United States Marine Corps
- History of the People's Liberation Army

== Sources ==
- Alexander, Bevin R. (1986). Korea: The First War We Lost. New York: Hippocrene Books. ISBN 9780870521355.
- "American Experience: The Battle of Chosin, Chapter 1". PBS. 1 November 2016. Archived from the original on 18 November 2019.
- Appleman, Roy (1987). East of Chosin: Entrapment and Breakout in Korea, 1950. Vol. 2. College Station, TX: Texas A and M University Military History Series. ISBN 978-0-89096-283-1.
- Appleman, Roy (1990). Escaping the Trap: The US Army X Corps in Northeast Korea, 1950. Vol. 14. College Station, Texas: Texas A&M University Military History Series. ISBN 978-0-89096-395-1.
- Appleman, Roy (1992). South to the Naktong, North to the Yalu. Washington, D.C.: Center of Military History, United States Army. ISBN 978-0-16-035958-3. Archived from the original on 2 November 2013.
- Brown, Ronald J. (2001), Counteroffensive: U.S. Marines from Pohang to No Name Line (PDF), Quantico, Virginia: History and Museums Division, Headquarters, U.S. Marine Corps, ISBN 9780160592928, archived (PDF) from the original on 13 May 2021
- "The Center for the Study of the Korean War". The Center for the Study of the Korean War. Archived from the original on 6 August 2016.
- Chinese Military Science Academy (2000). 抗美援朝战争史 [History of War to Resist America and Aid Korea] (in Chinese). Vol. II. Beijing: Chinese Military Science Academy Publishing House. ISBN 7801373901.
- "Chosin Reservoir: Epic of Endurance". Korean War Educator. 23 January 2007. Archived from the original on 13 January 2017.
- Cohen, Eliot A. (2012), Military Misfortunes: The Anatomy of Failure in War, New York: Simon and Schuster, ISBN 9781439135488
- Cole, Hugh M. (1965). The Ardennes: Battle of the Bulge. OFFICE OF THE CHIEF OF MILITARY HISTORY, DEPARTMENT OF THE ARMY. Archived from the original on 27 October 2019.
- Cumings, Bruce (2005). Korea's Place in the Sun: A Modern History. New York: W. W. Norton & Company. ISBN 9780393347531.
- Cunningham-Boothe, Ashley; Farrar, Peter (1989). British Forces in the Korean War. Leamington Spa, UK: British Korean Veterans Association. ISBN 978-0-9512622-0-7.
- Daily, Edward L. (1999). MacArthur's X Corps in Korea: Inchon to the Yalu, 1950. Paducah, Kentucky: Turner Publishing Company. ISBN 978-1-56311-439-7.
- Department of Health, People's Liberation Army General Logistics Department (1988). 抗美援朝战争卫生工作总结 : 卫生勤务 (in Chinese) (1st ed.). Beijing: Department of Health, People's Liberation Army General Logistics Department. OCLC 1133095915.
- Down in the weeds: close air support in Korea. DIANE Publishing. ISBN 1428990178. Archived from the original on 13 May 2021.
- "DPMO White Paper, Punch Bowl 239" (PDF). Washington, D.C.: United States Department of Defense. Archived from the original (PDF) on 27 April 2011.
- Duncan, James Carl (2013). Adventures of a Tennessean. Author House. ISBN 9781481741576. Archived from the original on 15 September 2021.
- "DWPO release April 29, 2008" (PDF). Washington, D.C.: United States Department of Defense. Archived from the original (PDF) on 26 September 2012.
- Edwards, Paul M. (2006). The Korean War. Westport, Connecticut: Greenwood Publishing Group. ISBN 9780313332487.
- Edwards, Paul M. (2018). The Mistaken History of the Korean War: What We Got Wrong Then and Now. Jefferson, North Carolina: McFarland. ISBN 9781476670485.
- Guang, Ting (光亭) (April 2007). Dong, Min Jie (董旻杰) (ed.). "Ice and Blood, Changjin Lake (冰血长津湖)". Sturm (突击) Magazine Korean War Special Issue (in Chinese). Hohhot, Inner Mongolia: Inner Mongolian People's Publishing House (内蒙古人民出版社). ISBN 978-7-204-08166-0.
- Halberstam, David (2007). The Coldest Winter – America and the Korean War. New York: Hyperion. ISBN 978-1-4013-0052-4.
- Ham, Walter T. IV (11 November 2010). "Veterans Mark 60th Anniversary of Legendary Reservoir Battle". Washington, D.C.: US Army.
- Hammel, Eric (1994), Chosin: Heroic Ordeal of the Korean War, Novato, California: Presidio Press, ISBN 978-0-89141-527-5
- Hickman, Kennedy. "Korean War: Battle of Chosin Reservoir". Military History About.com. Archived from the original on 3 April 2015.
- Hull, Michael D. (12 August 2001). "The Dragon Strikes (by Patrick C. Roe) : MH: Book Review". Historynet. Archived from the original on 19 September 2018.
- "Korea, The Forgotten War... remembered" (PDF). America's Forgotten Victory: The Graybeards. 16: 17. October 2002. Archived (PDF) from the original on 5 September 2021.
- Li, Xiaobing (2014). China's Battle for Korea: The 1951 Spring Offensive. Bloomington: Indiana University Press.
- Millett, Allan R. (2009). "Korean War". Encyclopædia Britannica. Archived from the original on 29 December 2008.
- Millett, Allan R. (2010). The War for Korea, 1950–1951: They Came From the North. Lawrence, Kansas: University Press of Kansas. ISBN 978-0-7006-1709-8.
- Millett, Allan R. "Battle of the Chosin Reservoir". Encyclopedia Britannica. Archived from the original on 6 January 2022.
- Montross, Lynn; Canzona, Nicholas (1992). U.S. Marine Operations in Korea: The Chosin Reservoir Campaign. Vol. 3. Austin, Texas: Robert J. Speights. ISBN 978-0-944495-03-2.
- Mossman, Billy C. (1990). Ebb and Flow: November 1950 – July 1951, United States Army in the Korean War. Washington, D.C.: Center of Military History, United States Army. ISBN 978-1-4102-2470-5. Archived from the original on 29 January 2021.
- "Operation Glory". Fort Lee, Virginia: Army Quartermaster Museum, U.S. Army. Archived from the original on 28 December 2007.
- "Remains from Korea identified as Ind. soldier". Springfield, VA: Army Times Publishing Company.
- "Retreat of the 20,000". New York: Time Inc. 18 December 1950. Archived from the original on 6 July 2009.
- Roe, Patrick C. (August 1996). "The Chinese Failure at Chosin". Dallas, TX: Korean War Project. Archived from the original on 13 June 2010.
- Roe, Patrick C. (2000), The Dragon Strikes: China and the Korean War, June-December 1950, Novato, California: Presidio, ISBN 978-0-89141-703-3
- Rumley, Chris (18 May 2010), 314th Delivers Bridge to Combat Troops, Little Rock, AR: Little Rock Air Force Base, archived from the original on 24 September 2011
- Russ, Martin (1999), Breakout: The Chosin Reservoir Campaign, Korea 1950, New York: Penguin Books, ISBN 978-0-14-029259-6
- Ryan, Mark A.; Finkelstein, David M.; McDevitt, Michael A. (2003), Chinese Warfighting: The PLA Experience Since 1949, Armonk, New York: M.E. Sharpe, ISBN 0765610876
- Seelinger, Matthew J. (20 January 2015). "Nightmare at the Chosin Reservoir". Army Historical Foundation. Archived from the original on 19 May 2022.
- Shrader, Charles R. (1995), Communist Logistics in the Korean War, Westport, Connecticut: Greenwood Press, ISBN 978-0-313-29509-6
- Sides, Hampton (2 October 2018). On Desperate Ground: The Epic Story of Chosin Reservoir. Penguin Random House. Archived from the original on 26 November 2019.
- Simmons, Edwin H. "Frozen Chosin: The Marines at the Changjin Reservoir" (PDF). p. 48. Archived (PDF) from the original on 26 February 2021.
- Spurr, Russell (1988), Enter the Dragon: China's Undeclared War Against the U.S. in Korea 1950–51, New York: Newmarket Press, ISBN 978-1-55704-008-4
- Stewart, Richard W. (2000), The Korean War: The Chinese Intervention (PDF), US Army Center of Military History, archived from the original (PDF) on 11 December 2018
- "Stretch of Route 35 in Monmouth County Named for 'Chosin Few' Vets of Korean War Battle". Archived from the original on 15 September 2021.
- Tilstra, Russell C. (2014). The Battle Rifle: Development and Use Since World War II. McFarland. ISBN 9781476615646. Archived from the original on 15 September 2021.
- Tucker, Spencer C.; Kim, Jinwung; Nichols, Michael R.; Pierpaoli, Paul G. Jr.; Zehr, Norman R. (2000). Encyclopedia of the Korean War: A Political, Social, and Military History. Vol. I. Santa Barbara, California: ABC-CLIO. ISBN 978-1-57607-029-1.
- Vogel, Steve (11 December 2000). "50 Years Later, an Army Force Gets Its Due". Washington Post. Archived from the original on 31 July 2018. "But a number of historians and some Marine veterans of Chosin now believe that the 1st Marine Division might have been destroyed had the poorly armed, ill-trained soldiers of Task Force Faith not bought time by keeping the Chinese from sweeping south."
- Vogel, Steve (2025). A Task Force Called Faith: The Untold Story of the U.S. Army Soldiers Who Fought for Survival at Chosin Reservoir--and Honor Back Home. Essex, Connecticut: Lyons Press. ISBN 978-1-4930-9289-5.
- Walker, Mark (15 September 2010). "MILITARY: 'Chosin Few' Monument Dedicated at Camp Pendleton". Escondido, CA: North County Times. Archived from the original on 19 September 2010.
- "Wars and Conflict: The Korean War". Hickam Air Force Base, HI: Joint POW/MIA Accounting Command. Archived from the original on 1 June 2009.
- Xue, Yan (徐焰) (1990). 第一次较量: 抗美援朝战争的历史回顾与反思 [First Confrontation: Reviews and Reflections on the History of War to Resist America and Aid Korea] (in Chinese). Beijing: Chinese Radio and Television Publishing House. ISBN 978-7-5043-0542-8.
- Xue, Yan (徐焰); Li, Jian (李健) (2000). "朝鲜战争——长津湖之战一" [Korean War — Battle of Changjin Lake, Part One] (in Chinese). Beijing: Chinese Academy of Social Sciences. Archived from the original on 17 July 2011.
- Xue, Yan (徐焰); Li, Jian (李健); et al. (2000). "朝鲜战争——长津湖之战四" [Korean War — Battle of Changjin Lake, Part Four] (in Chinese). Beijing: Chinese Academy of Social Sciences. Archived from the original on 17 July 2011.
- Zhang, Shu Guang (1995). Mao's Military Romanticism: China and the Korean War, 1950–1953. Lawrence, Kansas: University Press of Kansas. ISBN 978-0-7006-0723-5.
- Ye, Yumeng (叶雨蒙) (2007). 东线祭殇 [Mourning the Eastern Front]. Beijing: 解放军文艺出版社. ISBN 978-7-5033-2045-3.
