= Changjin County =

Jangjin County 장진군
- County

Korean transcription(s)
  - Hanja: 長津郡
  - McCune-Reischauer: Changjin kun
  - Revised Romanization: Jangjin-gun
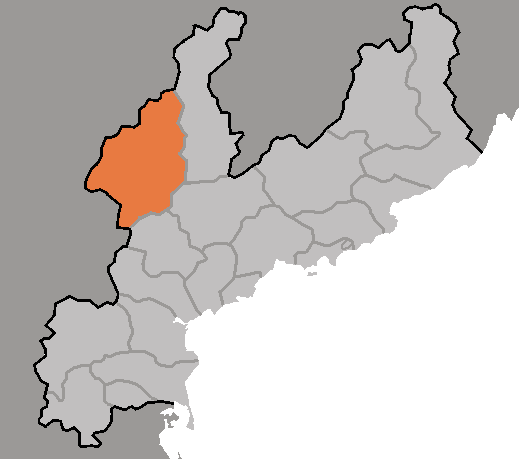
- Map of South Hamgyong showing the location of Changjin
- Country: North Korea
- Province: South Hamgyong Province
- Administrative divisions: 1 ŭp, 3 workers' districts, 16 ri

Area
  - Total: 1,861 km^{2} (719 sq mi)

Population (2008)
  - Total: 64,681
  - Density: 34.76/km^{2} (90.02/sq mi)

Changjin or Jangjin is a mountainous county in South Hamgyong Province, North Korea.

== Geography ==
Changjin lies on the Rangrim and Pujŏllyong ranges, and most of the county sits atop the Kaema Plateau. Due to this location, Changjin has a particularly cold climate. The highest point is Ryŏnhwasan (련화산). The chief stream is the Changjin River. Lake Changjin is a large reservoir in Changjin County.

== Climate ==
Climate data for Changjin (1991–2020)
Month	Jan	Feb	Mar	Apr	May	Jun	Jul	Aug	Sep	Oct	Nov	Dec	Year
Mean daily maximum °C (°F)	−6.5 (20.3)	−3.4 (25.9)	2.4 (36.3)	10.4 (50.7)	17.6 (63.7)	21.4 (70.5)	23.4 (74.1)	23.4 (74.1)	19.1 (66.4)	12.6 (54.7)	3.2 (37.8)	−4.8 (23.4)	9.9 (49.8)
Daily mean °C (°F)	−14.8 (5.4)	−11.3 (11.7)	−4.3 (24.3)	3.3 (37.9)	10.0 (50.0)	14.5 (58.1)	17.9 (64.2)	17.6 (63.7)	11.9 (53.4)	4.8 (40.6)	−3.1 (26.4)	−11.6 (11.1)	2.9 (37.2)
Mean daily minimum °C (°F)	−22.2 (−8.0)	−19.3 (−2.7)	−11.1 (12.0)	−3.3 (26.1)	2.9 (37.2)	8.8 (47.8)	13.6 (56.5)	13.5 (56.3)	6.6 (43.9)	−1.2 (29.8)	−8.6 (16.5)	−18.2 (−0.8)	−3.2 (26.2)
Average precipitation mm (inches)	6.3 (0.25)	10.2 (0.40)	13.3 (0.52)	34.3 (1.35)	66.6 (2.62)	78.9 (3.11)	177.2 (6.98)	139.2 (5.48)	77.6 (3.06)	32.9 (1.30)	26.2 (1.03)	10.9 (0.43)	673.6 (26.52)
Average precipitation days (≥ 0.1 mm)	3.4	3.8	5.9	7.2	9.1	10.5	11.6	10.9	6.7	5.0	6.6	5.9	86.6
Average snowy days	3.8	4.0	5.4	4.0	0.5	0.2	0.0	0.0	0.1	0.7	5.2	6.2	30.1
Average relative humidity (%)	77.0	74.3	72.2	70.0	71.8	81.0	87.3	87.1	82.9	76.3	77.1	77.0	77.8
Source: Korea Meteorological Administration

== Administrative divisions ==
Changjin County is divided into 1 ŭp (town), 3 rodongjagu (workers' districts) and 16 ri (villages):

- Changjin-ŭp
- Hwangch'o-rodongjagu
- Manp'ung-rodongjagu
- Yangji-rodongjagu
- Chukchŏl-li
- Ch'ŏngryang-ri
- Kaljŏl-li
- Memul-li
- Nŭpsu-ri
- Paeg'am-ri
- P'ungryu-ri
- Rimsal-li
- Ryongho-ri
- Ryudam-ri
- Sindae-ri
- Sinhŭng-ri
- Soksa-ri
- Sŏmong-ri
- Tonae-ri
- Yangmyo-ri

== History ==
In historical contexts the lake is sometimes known according to its Japanese pronunciation, as the Chōshin Reservoir. (Most likely the Japanese pronunciation of the Korean name, for the actual Kanji; 長津湖, is read out as Nagatsu mizuumi). In 1950 it was the site of a major battle of the Korean War, the Battle of Chosin Reservoir, in which the Chinese People's Volunteer Army stopped the northward advance of the United Nations allied forces, but paid a heavy price in casualties.

== Economy ==
Changjin produces large amounts of lumber, and leads the province in mine production. Deposits of silver, graphite, jade, and gold are found in the area. Local agriculture is dominated by livestock raising and dry-field farming; local crops include potatoes, barley, soybeans, red beans, maize, and oats.

Jangjin has a hydropower station on the Jangjin river with its construction goals being completed during the 80-day campaign for the 8th congress of the WPK.

== Transportation ==
Although it could long be reached only by horse or automobile, the construction of a power plant on the Changjin River also brought the Changjin Line of the Korean State Railway to the county. Water transportation also developed thanks to the power station.

== See also ==
- Geography of North Korea
- Administrative divisions of North Korea
- Battle of Chosin Reservoir
