= North Korea =

Country in East Asia

Democratic People's Republic of Korea 조선민주주의인민공화국 (Korean) Chosŏnminjujuŭiinmin'gonghwaguk
- Flag Emblem
- Anthem: 조선민주주의인민공화국 국가 ("National Anthem of the Democratic People's Republic of Korea")
- Capital and largest city: Pyongyang; 39°2′N 125°45′E
- Official languages: Korean (Munhwaŏ)
- Official script: Chosŏn'gŭl (Hangul) (Note: Usually called "Hangul" internationally and "Hangeul" in South Korea.)
- Religion (2020): 72.9% no religion (Note: North Korea is officially an atheist state. According to the U.S. Office of International Religious Freedom, North Korea is 58% agnostic and 15% atheist.); 13% Chondoism; 12% Shamanism; 1.5% Buddhism; 0.5% other (Note: Including Christianity and Chinese folk religion.)
- Demonyms: North Korean; Korean
- Government: Unitary communist state
  - WPK General Secretary and SAC President (Note: The Supreme Leader of North Korea, who holds the titles of: General Secretary of the Workers' Party of Korea; President of the State Affairs of North Korea): Kim Jong Un
  - Premier: Pak Thae-song
  - Chairman of the SPA: Vacant
- Legislature: Supreme People's Assembly

Establishment history
  - Provisional Government in-exile: 11 April 1919
  - Soviet administration north of the 38th parallel: 24 August 1945
  - 1st provisional government: 8 February 1946
  - 2nd provisional government: 22 February 1947
  - DPRK established: 9 September 1948
  - Current constitution: 27 December 1972

Area
  - Total: 120,538 km^{2} (46,540 sq mi) (98th)
  - Water (%): 0.11

Population
  - 2024 estimate: ▲25,950,000 (56th)
  - 2008 census: ▲24,052,231
  - Density: 220/km^{2} (569.8/sq mi) (69th)
- GDP (PPP): 2023 estimate
  - Total: ▼$15.416 billion
  - Per capita: ▼$600
- GDP (nominal): 2025 estimate
  - Total: ▲$34.103 billion
  - Per capita: ▲$1,317
- Currency: Korean people's won (₩) (Note: Foreign currency may be in use in North Korea in black markets.) (KPW)
- Time zone: UTC+09:00 (PYT)
- Date format: yy, yyyy년 mm월 dd일; yy, yyyy/mm/dd (AD)
- Calling code: +850
- ISO 3166 code: KP
- Internet TLD: .kp

North Korea, (Note: North Koreans use Chosŏn (Korean: 조선; Hanja: 朝鮮) when referring to North Korea or Korea as a whole. The literal translation of North Korea, Pukchosŏn (북조선; 北朝鮮), is rarely used, although it may be found in sources that predate the Korean War. South Koreans use Bukhan (Pukhan; 북한; 北韓) when referring to North Korea, derived from the South Korean name for Korea, Hanguk (Han'guk; 한국; 韓國).) officially the Democratic People's Republic of Korea (DPRK), (Note: 조선민주주의인민공화국 (Hanja: 朝鮮民主主義人民共和國; MR: Chosŏnminjujuŭiinmin'gonghwaguk), also abbreviated as DPR Korea or Korea, DPR) is a country in East Asia. It constitutes the northern half of the Korean Peninsula and borders China and Russia to the north at the Yalu (Amnok) and Tumen rivers, and South Korea (officially the Republic of Korea) to the south at the Korean Demilitarized Zone (DMZ). (Note: North Korea's border with South Korea is a disputed border as South Korea claims the entirety of the Korean Peninsula.) The country's western border is formed by the Yellow Sea, while its eastern border is defined by the Sea of Japan. Pyongyang is the capital and largest city.

The Korean Peninsula was first inhabited as early as the Lower Paleolithic period. Its first kingdom was noted in Chinese records in the early 7th century BCE. Following the unification of the Three Kingdoms of Korea into Silla and Balhae in the late 7th century, Korea was ruled by the Goryeo dynasty (918–1392) and the Joseon dynasty (1392–1897). The succeeding Korean Empire (1897–1910) was annexed in 1910 into Japan. In 1945, after the Japanese surrender at the end of World War II, Korea was divided into two zones along the 38th parallel, with the north occupied by the Soviet Union and the south occupied by the United States.

In 1948, two separate governments were formed in Korea: the Soviet-aligned Democratic People's Republic of Korea in the north, and the Western-aligned Republic of Korea in the south. The North Korean invasion of South Korea in 1950 started the Korean War. In 1953, the Korean Armistice Agreement brought about a ceasefire and established a demilitarized zone (DMZ). Kim Il Sung, North Korea's first leader, consolidated power and promoted his personal philosophy of Juche as the state ideology. Pyongyang's international isolation sharply accelerated from the 1980s onwards as the Cold War came to an end. The dissolution of the Soviet Union in 1991 then brought about a sharp decline to the North Korean economy. From 1994 to 1998, North Korea suffered a famine with the population continuing to suffer from malnutrition. In 2024, North Korea formally abandoned efforts to reunify Korea and designated South Korea as a separate, hostile state.

North Korea is a totalitarian hereditary dictatorship with a comprehensive cult of personality around the Kim family. Amnesty International considers the country to have the worst human rights record in the world. Officially, North Korea is a communist state, and describes itself as a socialist state which holds democratic elections. However, outside observers have described the elections as unfair, uncompetitive, and pre-determined. The Workers' Party of Korea (WPK) is the sole ruling party of North Korea, while Kimilsungism–Kimjongilism is the official ideology. The means of production are owned by the state through state-run enterprises and collectivized farms. Most services—such as healthcare, education, housing, and food production—are subsidized or state-funded.

North Korea is highly militarized, prioritizing the Korean People's Army in the allocation of resources. It possesses nuclear weapons. Its active-duty army of 1.28 million soldiers is the fourth-largest in the world. In addition to being a member of the United Nations since 1991, North Korea is also a member of the Non-Aligned Movement, the G77, and the ASEAN Regional Forum.

== Etymology ==
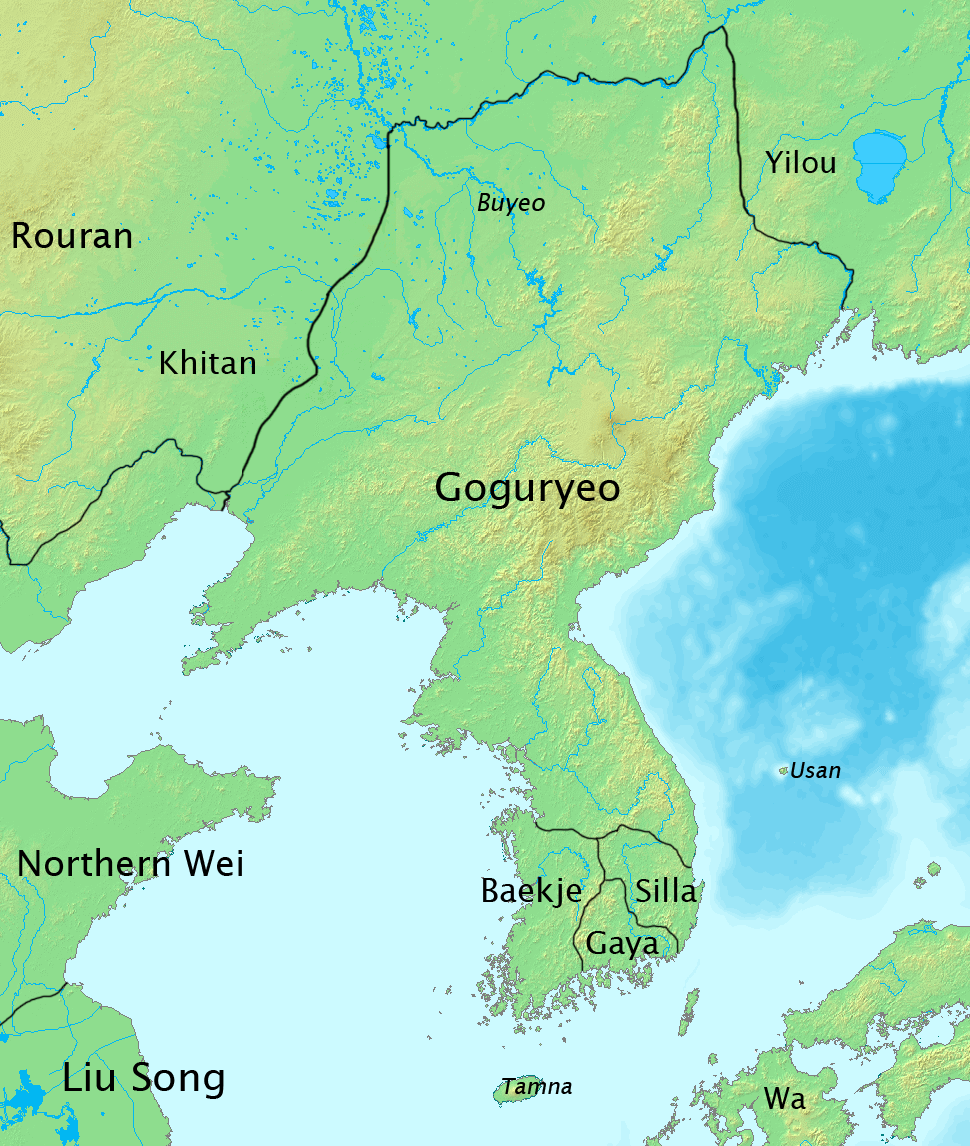
The name Korea is derived from Goguryeo, also known as Koryŏ, one of the Three Kingdoms of Korea.

The modern spelling of Korea first appeared in 1671 in the travel writings of Hendrick Hamel, a sailor of the Dutch East India Company.

After the division of the country into North and South Korea, the two sides used different terms to refer to Korea: Chosŏn (조선) in North Korea, and Hanguk (한국) in South Korea. In 1948, North Korea adopted Democratic People's Republic of Korea (조선민주주의인민공화국; 朝鮮民主主義人民共和國; Chosŏnminjujuŭiinmin'gonghwaguk;) as its official name. According to Daily NK, the country's official name is frequently shortened to just "the Republic" (공화국; 共和國; Konghwaguk) within North Korea.

In the wider world, because its government controls the northern part of the Korean Peninsula, it is commonly called North Korea to distinguish it from South Korea, which is officially called the Republic of Korea in English. Both governments historically considered themselves to be the legitimate government of the whole of Korea; for this reason, the people of North Korea consider themselves Koreans, not North Koreans, with foreign visitors being discouraged from using the latter term.

== History ==
=== Background ===
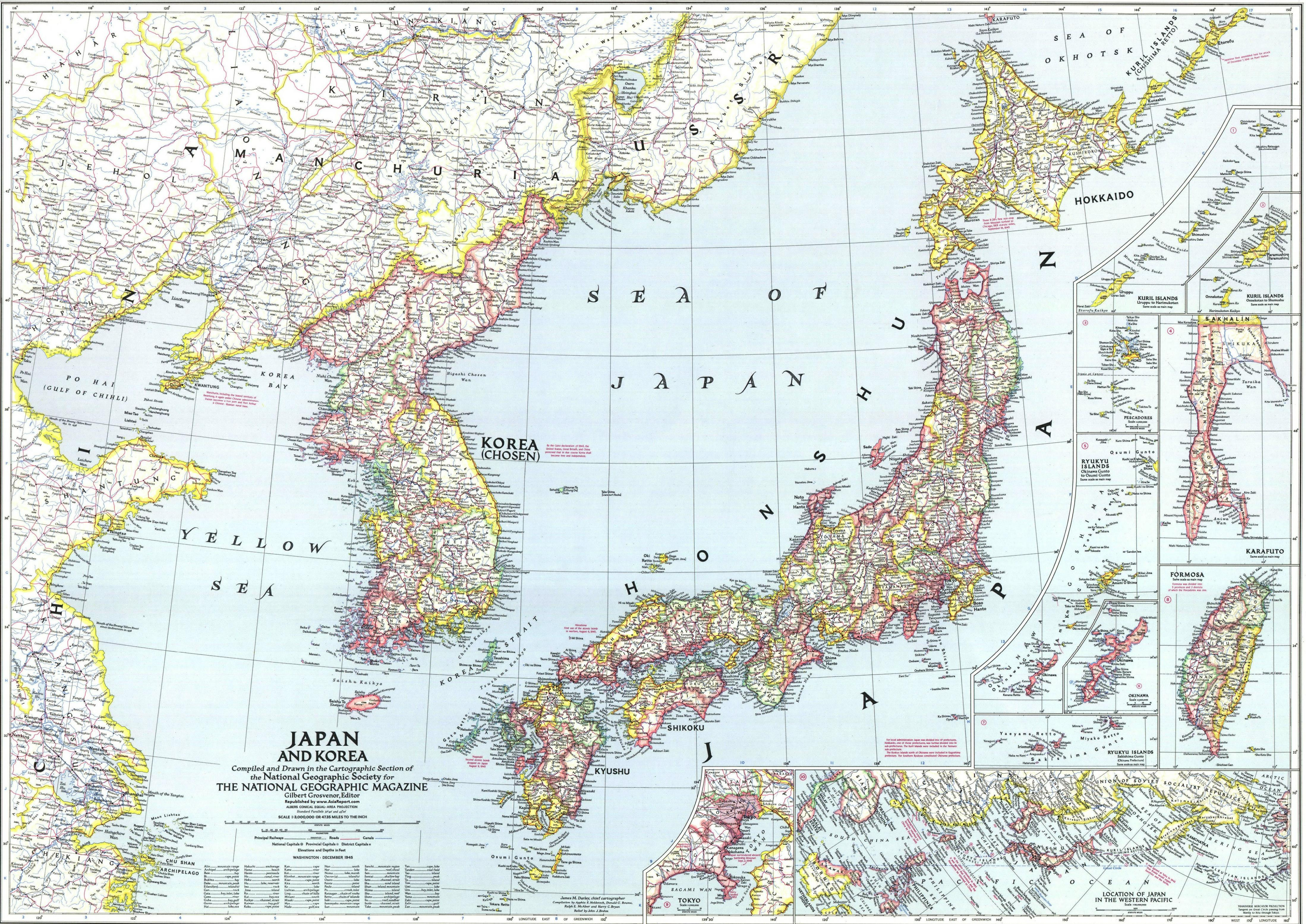
A 1945 National Geographic map of Korea, showing Japanese place names and provincial boundaries.

In the late 19th century, Korea came under the influence of Japan, which had become a significant regional power after winning the First Sino-Japanese War against Qing China and the Russo-Japanese War against the Russian Empire. Japan compelled Korea to become its protectorate in 1905 and formally annexed it in 1910. What followed was a period of forced assimilation, in which Korean language, culture, and history were suppressed. This led to the March First Movement protests in 1919 and the subsequent foundation of resistance groups in exile, primarily in China. Among the resistance groups was Provisional Government of the Republic of Korea. During the Japanese colonial period, most Koreans were peasants engaged in subsistence farming. In the 1930s, Japan developed mines, hydro-electric dams, steel mills, and manufacturing plants in northern Korea and neighboring Manchuria. The Korean industrial working class expanded rapidly, and many Koreans went to work in Manchuria. As a result, 65% of Korea's heavy industry was located in the north, but, due to the rugged terrain, only 37% of its agriculture. A Korean guerrilla movement emerged in the mountainous interior and in Manchuria, harassing the Japanese imperial authorities. One of the most prominent guerrilla leaders was the Communist Kim Il Sung.

=== Joint US-Soviet occupation and Division of Korea ===
After the Japanese surrender at the end of World War II in 1945, the Korean Peninsula was divided into two occupation zones along the 38th parallel, with the northern half of the peninsula occupied by the Soviet Union and the southern half by the United States. Negotiations on reunification failed. Soviet general Terentii Shtykov recommended the establishment of the Soviet Civil Administration in August 1945, and supported Kim Il Sung as chairman of the Provisional People's Committee of North Korea, established in February 1946. In September 1946, South Korean citizens rose up against the Allied Military Government. In April 1948, an uprising of the Jeju islanders was violently crushed. The South declared its statehood in May 1948 and two months later the ardent anti-communist Syngman Rhee became its ruler. The Democratic People's Republic of Korea was established in the North on 9 September 1948. Shtykov served as the first Soviet ambassador, while Kim Il Sung became premier.

Soviet forces withdrew from the North in 1948, and most American forces withdrew from the South in 1949. Ambassador Shtykov suspected Rhee was planning to invade the North and was sympathetic to Kim's goal of Korean unification under socialism. The two successfully lobbied Soviet leader Joseph Stalin to support a quick war against the South, which culminated in the outbreak of the Korean War.

=== Korean War ===
Territory often changed hands early in the war, until the front stabilized. North Korean, Chinese, and Soviet forces South Korean, U.S., Commonwealth, and United Nations forces

The military of North Korea invaded the South on 25 June 1950, and swiftly overran most of the country. The United Nations Command (UNC) was subsequently established following the UN Security Council's recognition of North Korean aggression against South Korea. The motion passed because the Soviet Union, a close ally of North Korea and a member of the UN Security Council, was boycotting the UN over its recognition of the Republic of China rather than the People's Republic of China. The UNC, led by the United States, intervened to defend the South, and rapidly advanced into North Korea. As they neared the border with China, Chinese forces intervened on behalf of North Korea, shifting the balance of the war again. Fighting ended on 27 July 1953, with an armistice that approximately restored the original boundaries between North and South Korea, but no peace treaty was signed. Approximately 3 million people died in the Korean War, with a higher proportional civilian death toll than World War II or the Vietnam War. In both per capita and absolute terms, North Korea was the country most devastated by the war, which resulted in the death of an estimated 12–15% of the North Korean population (c. 10 million), "a figure close to or surpassing the proportion of Soviet citizens killed in World War II", according to Charles K. Armstrong. As a result of the war, almost every substantial building in North Korea was destroyed. Some have referred to the conflict as a civil war, with other factors involved.

A heavily guarded demilitarized zone (DMZ) still divides the peninsula, and an anti-communist and anti-North Korea sentiment remains in South Korea. Since the war, the United States has maintained a strong military presence in the South which is depicted by the North Korean government as an imperialist occupation force. It claims that the Korean War was caused by the United States and South Korea.

=== Leadership of Kim Il Sung ===
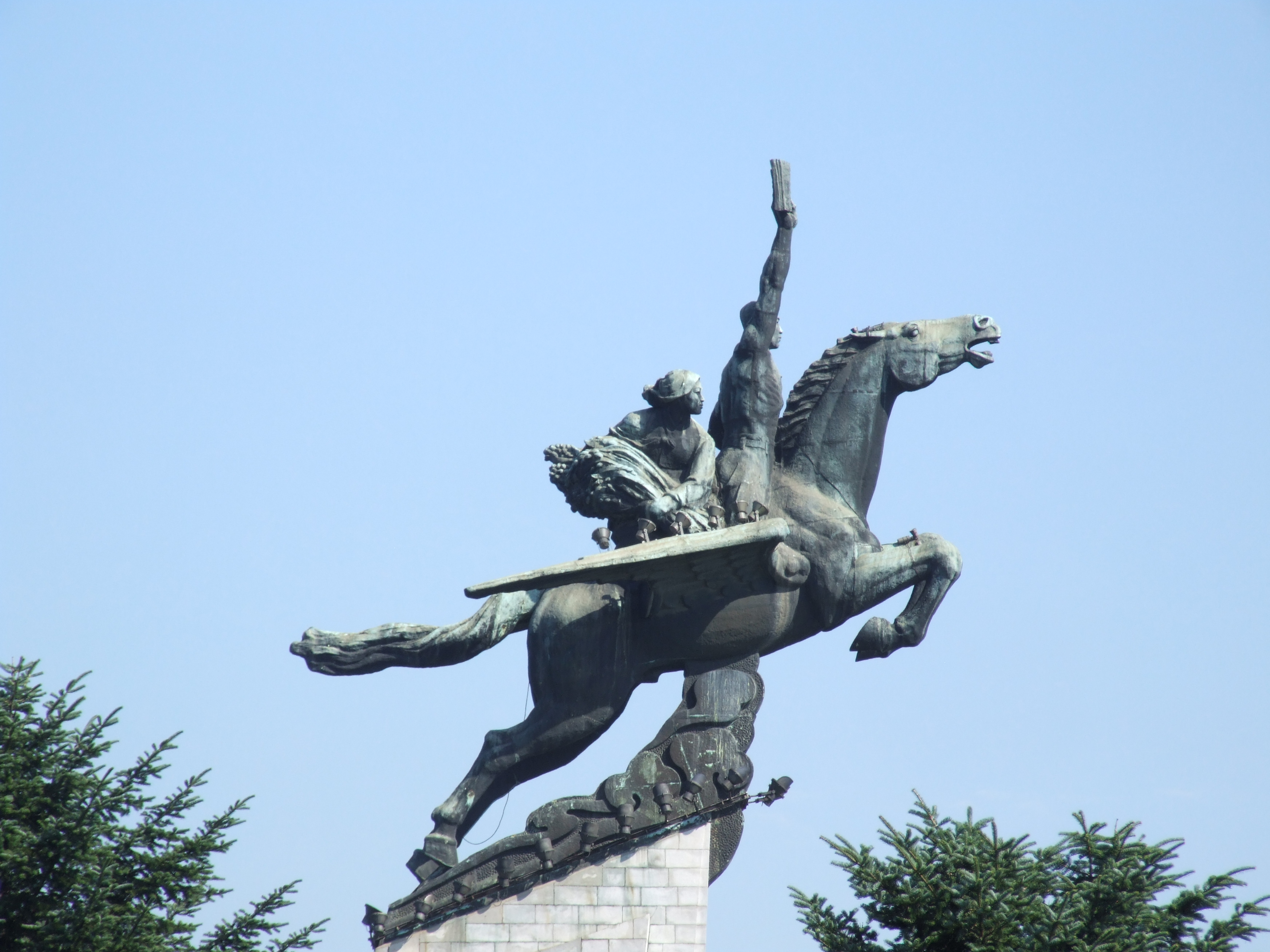
Statue of Chollima Movement in Pyongyang

The post-war 1950s and 1960s saw an ideological shift in North Korea, as Kim Il Sung sought to consolidate his power. He was highly critical of Soviet premier Nikita Khrushchev and his de-Stalinization policies and critiqued Khrushchev as revisionist. During the 1956 August faction incident, Kim Il Sung purged the rival Soviet and Yan'an factions and successfully resisted efforts by the Soviet Union and China to depose him. Some scholars believe that the 1956 August incident was an example of North Korea demonstrating political independence. Most scholars consider the final withdrawal of Chinese troops from North Korea in October 1958 to be the latest date when North Korea became effectively independent. In the late 1950s and early 1960s, North Korea sought to distinguish itself internationally by becoming a leader of the Non-Aligned Movement and promoting the ideology of Juche. Despite its efforts to break out of the Soviet and Chinese spheres of influence, North Korea remained closely aligned with both countries throughout the Cold War.

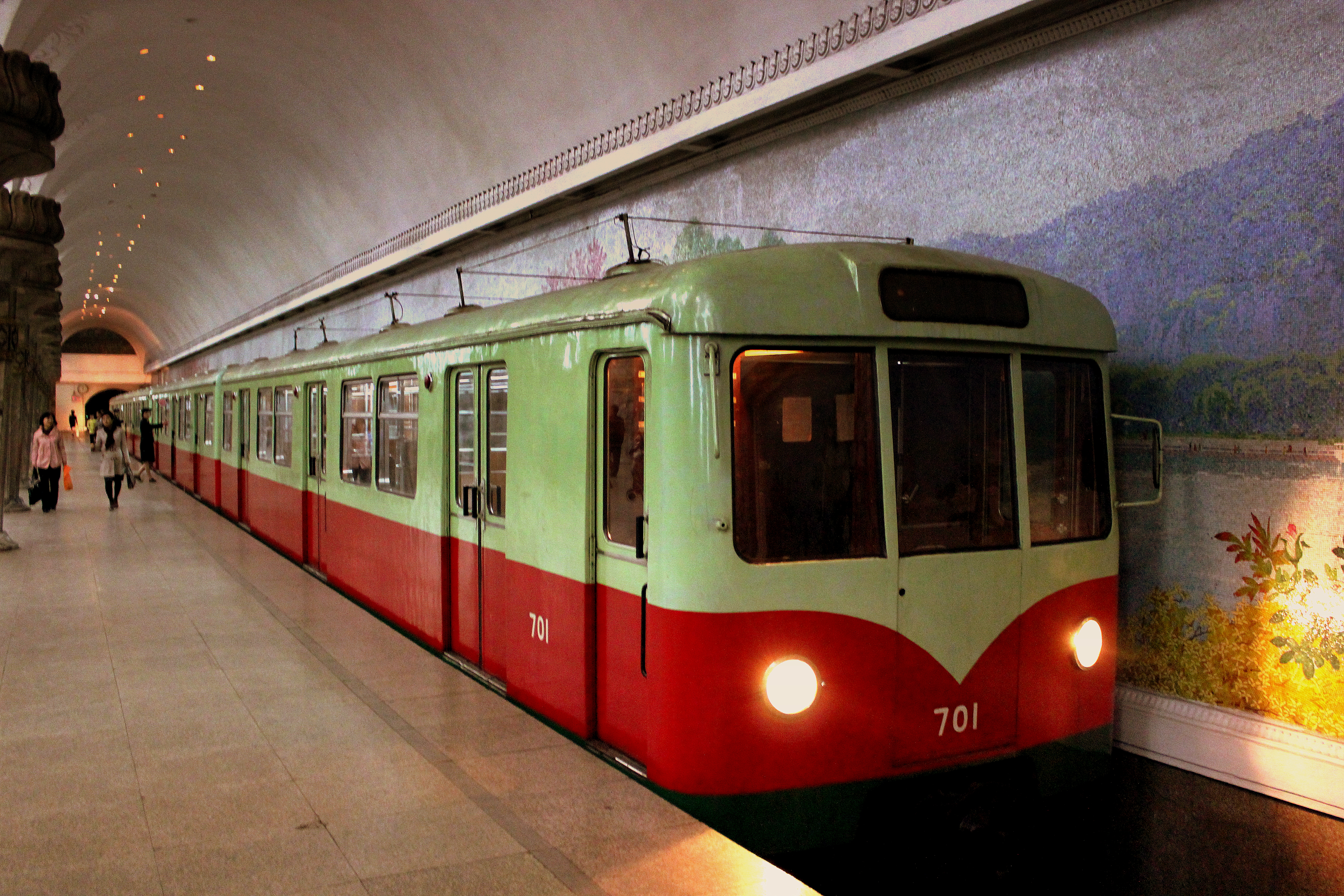
Pyongyang Metro with bomb shelter functions

Industry was the favored sector in North Korea. Industrial production returned to pre-war levels by 1957. In 1959, relations with Japan had improved somewhat, and North Korea began allowing the repatriation of Japanese citizens in the country. The same year, North Korea revalued the North Korean won, which held greater value than its South Korean counterpart. Until the 1960s, economic growth was higher than in South Korea, and North Korean GDP per capita was equal to that of its southern neighbor as late as 1976. However, by the 1980s, the economy had begun to stagnate; it started its long decline in 1987 and almost completely collapsed after the dissolution of the Soviet Union in 1991, when all Soviet aid was suddenly halted.

An internal CIA study acknowledged various achievements of the North Korean government post-war: compassionate care for war orphans and children in general, a radical improvement in the status of women, free housing, free healthcare, and health statistics particularly in life expectancy and infant mortality that were comparable to even the most advanced nations up until the North Korean famine. Life expectancy in the North was 72 before the famine which was only marginally lower than in the South. The country once boasted a comparatively developed healthcare system; pre-famine North Korea had a network of nearly 45,000 family practitioners with some 800 hospitals and 1,000 clinics.

The relative peace between the North and South following the armistice was interrupted by border skirmishes, celebrity abductions, and assassination attempts. The North failed in several assassination attempts on South Korean leaders, such as in 1968, 1974, and the Rangoon bombing in 1983; tunnels were found under the DMZ and tensions flared over the axe murder incident at Panmunjom in 1976. For almost two decades after the war, the two states did not seek to negotiate with one another. In 1971, secret, high-level contacts began to be conducted culminating in the 1972 July 4 South–North Joint Statement that established principles of working toward peaceful reunification. The talks ultimately failed because in 1973, South Korea declared its preference that the two Koreas should seek separate memberships in international organizations.

=== Leadership of Kim Jong Il ===
The Soviet Union was dissolved in 1991, ending its aid and support to North Korea. In 1992, as Kim Il Sung's health began deteriorating, his son Kim Jong Il slowly began taking over various state tasks. Kim Il Sung died of a heart attack in 1994; Kim Jong Il declared a three-year period of national mourning, afterward officially announcing his position as the new leader. Flooding in the mid-1990s exacerbated the economic crisis, severely damaging crops and infrastructure and leading to widespread famine that the government proved incapable of curtailing, resulting in the deaths of between 240,000 and 420,000 people and leading to the flight of many North Koreans into China, South Korea and neighboring countries. In China, these illegal North Korea child immigrants are called the Kotjebi. In 1996, the government accepted UN food aid.

North Korea promised to halt its development of nuclear weapons under the Agreed Framework, signed in 1994. South Korea began to engage with the North as part of its Sunshine Policy. Kim Jong Il instituted a policy called Songun, or "military first". In 1999 and 2002, North Korea engaged in two battles on the Yeonpyeongdo islands, the second of which while the South was hosting the FIFA World Cup. In 2006, North Korea announced it had conducted its first nuclear weapons test. Tensions with South Korea and the United States increased in 2010 with the sinking of the South Korean warship Cheonan and North Korea's bombardment of Yeonpyeongdo.

=== Leadership of Kim Jong Un ===
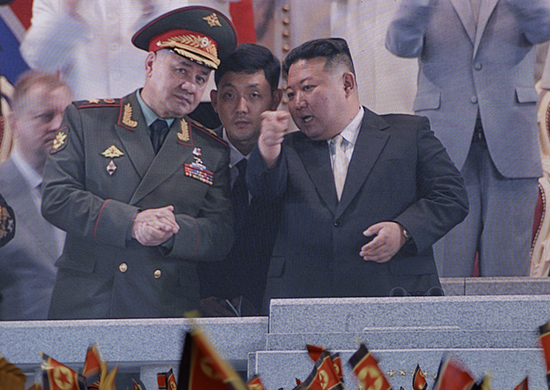
Kim Jong Un with Russian defence minister Sergei Shoigu during the ceremonies marking the 70th anniversary of the end of the Korean War in Pyongyang, 27 July 2023

On 17 December 2011, Kim Jong Il died from a heart attack. His youngest son Kim Jong Un was announced as his successor. North Korea continued to develop its nuclear arsenal, possibly including a hydrogen bomb and a missile capable of reaching the United States. Throughout 2017, following Donald Trump's ascension to the US presidency, relations between the United States and North Korea worsened, and there was a period of heightened tension between the two countries. The tensions substantially decreased in 2018, and a détente developed. A series of summits took place between North Korea, South Korea and the United States, though the talks ultimately broke down.

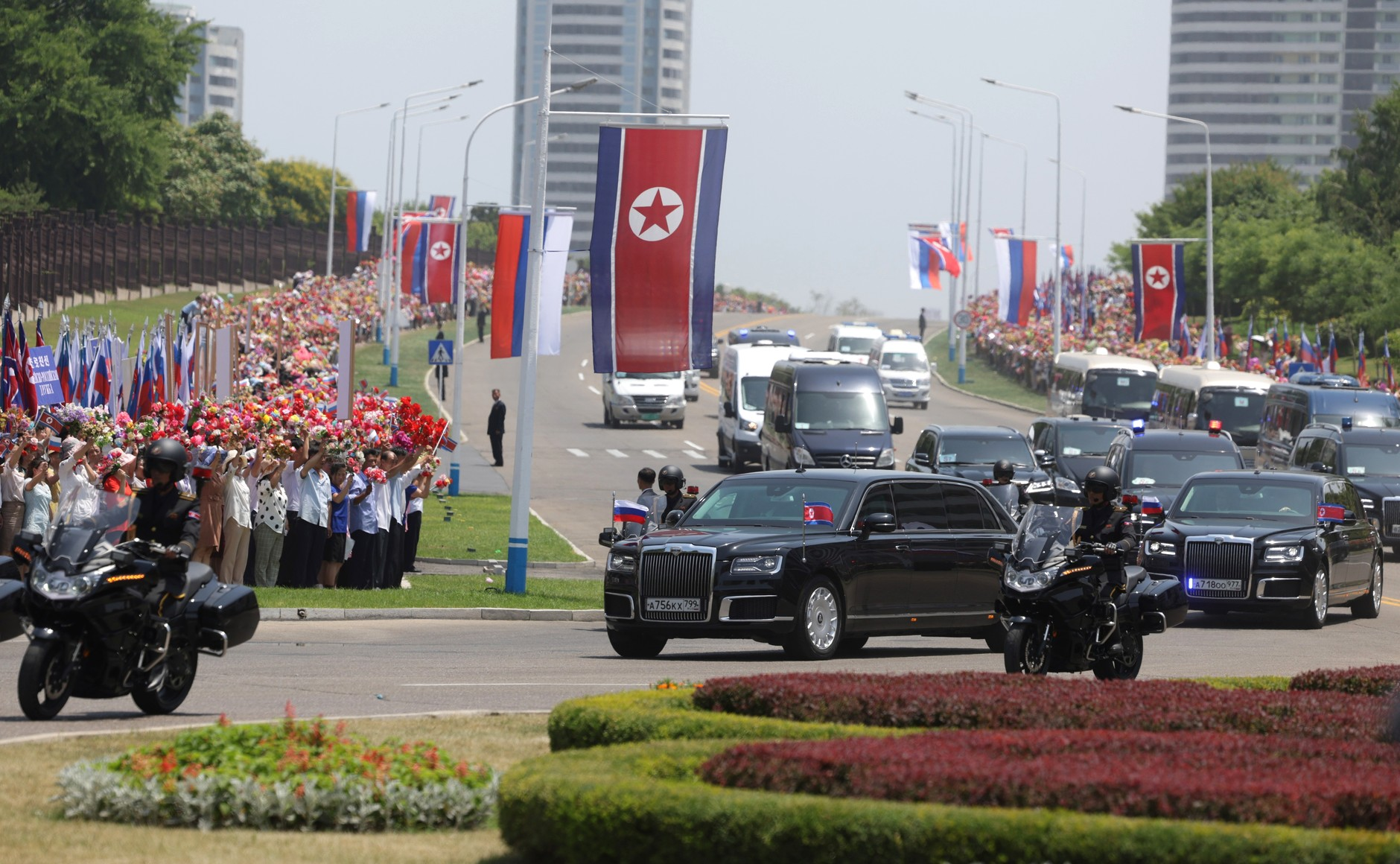
Motorcade transporting Russian president Vladimir Putin in Pyongyang, 19 June 2024

On 30 December 2023, Kim Jong Un announced that unification with South Korea was no longer possible. In 2024, North Korea deployed a contingent of troops to Russia in support of the Russo-Ukrainian war. The separation from the Seoul was formalized in May 2026 when the country's constitution was amended, portraying South Korea as a "hostile state" and removing any tie to a shared heritage.

== Geography ==
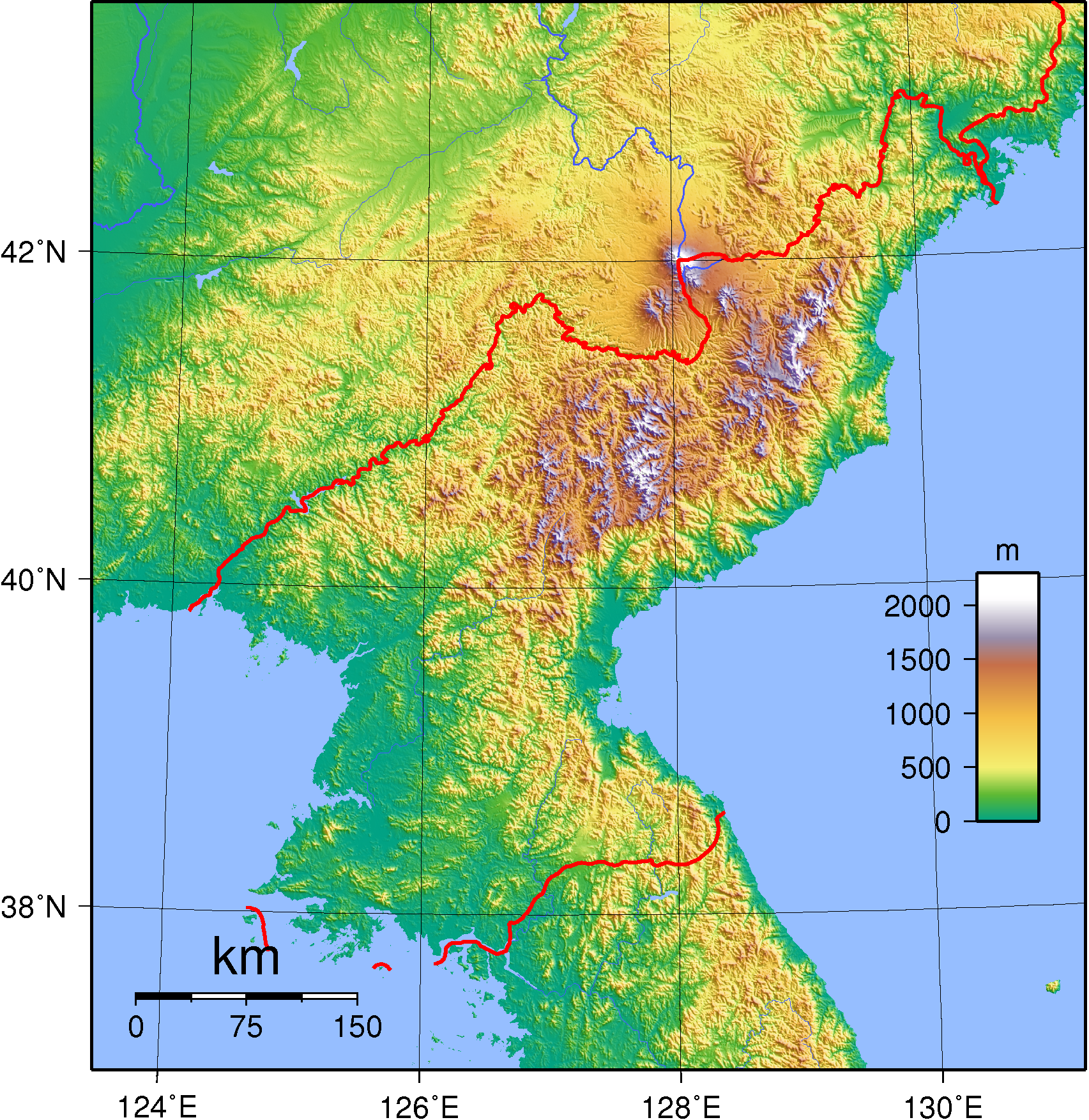
Topographic map of North Korea

North Korea occupies the northern portion of the Korean Peninsula, lying between latitudes 37° and 43°N, and longitudes 124° and 131°E. It covers an area of 120,540 square kilometers (46,541 sq mi). To its west are the Yellow Sea and Korea Bay, and to its east lies Japan across the Sea of Japan.

Early European visitors to Korea remarked that the country resembled "a sea in a heavy gale" because of the many successive mountain ranges that crisscross the peninsula. Some 80 percent of North Korea is composed of mountains and uplands, separated by deep and narrow valleys. All of the Korean Peninsula's mountains with elevations of 2,000 meters (6,600 ft) or more are located in North Korea. The highest point in North Korea is Paektu Mountain, a volcanic mountain with an elevation of 2,744 meters (9,003 ft) above sea level. Considered a sacred place by North Koreans, Mount Paektu holds significance in Korean culture and has been incorporated in the elaborate folklore and personality cult around the Kim family. For example, the song, "We Will Go To Mount Paektu" sings in praise of Kim Jong Un and describes a symbolic trek to the mountain. Other prominent ranges are the Hamgyong Range in the extreme northeast and the Rangrim Mountains, which are located in the north-central part of North Korea. Mount Kumgang in the Taebaek Range, which extends into South Korea, is famous for its scenic beauty.

The coastal plains are wide in the west and discontinuous in the east. A great majority of the population lives in the plains and lowlands. According to a United Nations Environmental Programme report in 2003, forest covers over 70 percent of the country, mostly on steep slopes. North Korea had a 2019 Forest Landscape Integrity Index mean score of 8.02/10, ranking it 28th globally out of 172 countries. The longest river is the Amnok (Yalu) River which flows for 790 kilometers (491 mi). The country contains three terrestrial ecoregions: Central Korean deciduous forests, Changbai Mountains mixed forests, and Manchurian mixed forests.

=== Climate ===
North Korea map of Köppen climate classification

North Korea experiences a humid continental climate within the Köppen climate classification scheme. Winters bring clear weather interspersed with snow storms as a result of northern and northwestern winds that blow from Siberia. Summer tends to be by far the hottest, most humid, and rainiest time of year because of the southern and southeastern monsoon winds that carry moist air from the Pacific Ocean. Approximately 60 percent of all precipitation occurs from June to September. Spring and autumn are transitional seasons between summer and winter. The daily average high and low temperatures for Pyongyang are −3 and −13 °C (27 and 9 °F) in January and 29 and 20 °C (84 and 68 °F) in August.

== Governance and politics ==
North Korea is a totalitarian hereditary dictatorship and highly centralized communist state that self-identifies as a socialist state. North Korea is unique among communist states due to the political dominance of the Kim family. The three supreme leaders of North Korea have all been members of the Kim family, and other members of the Kim family are prominent in North Korean political life as well; because of this North Korea's political system has been characterized as hereditary or dynastic. Kim Jong Un, the current supreme leader, heads all major governing structures: he is the leader of the Workers' Party of Korea, the head of state, and the commander-in-chief of the Korean People's Army.

=== Workers' Party of Korea ===
The Workers' Party of Korea (WPK) is the founding and sole ruling party of North Korea. While two other parties – the Korean Social Democratic Party and the Chondoist Chongu Party – exist, they are subordinate to the WPK. The leading role of the WPK over state and society is enshrined in the constitution by stating that "the Democratic People's Republic of Korea shall conduct all activities under the leadership of the Workers' Party of Korea." All state organs of North Korea operate under the leadership of the WPK; because of the party's organizational principle of democratic centralism, all party members in state organs are required to implement the decisions of the Central Committee of the WPK. All state organs consist of a majority of party members as well. The party also establishes party groups within state organs, which the WPK Central Committee supervises through its Organization and Guidance Department and other departments.

The highest organ of the WPK is the party congress, which meets at least every fifth year. It elects the General Secretary (the party leader) and the members and candidates of the WPK Central Committee. At its first session after a party congress, the WPK Central Committee elects its central leading organs: the Presidium, the Politburo, the Secretariat, the Central Military Commission (CMC) and the Central Auditing Commission (CAC). The general secretary leads the work of the Presidium, Politburo and the Secretariat, and concurrently serves as chairman of the CMC. These organs are delegated specific powers of the Central Committee when the latter is not in session; the Presidium is the party's highest decision-making organ when the Politburo, Central Committee, the Conference of Representatives and the Congress are not in session.

=== Supreme People's Assembly ===
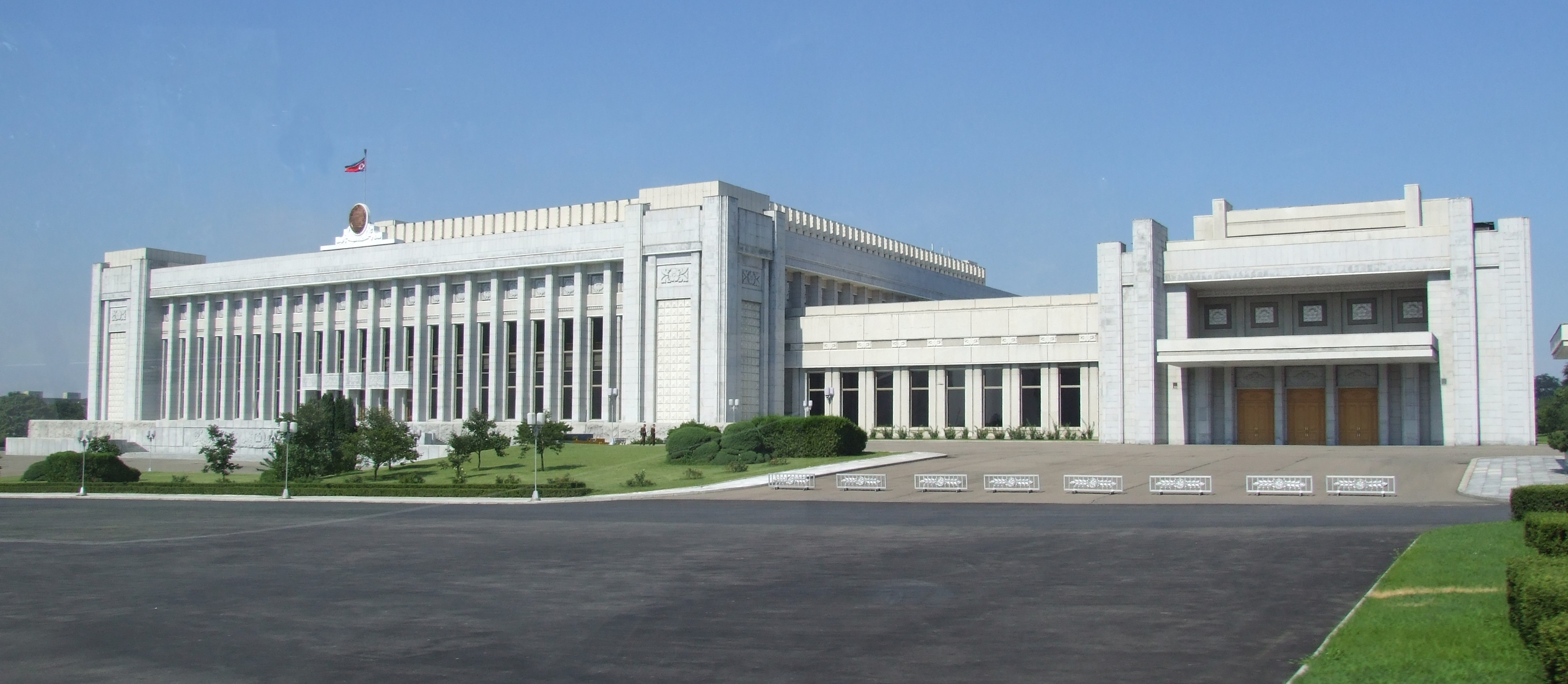
Mansudae Assembly Hall, seat of the Supreme People's Assembly

The Supreme People's Assembly (SPA) is North Korea's supreme state organ of power, organised on the principle of unified state power. All other state organs are accountable to it on the basis of democratic centralism. The SPA as the supreme state organ delegates its powers to inferior ones, who make up North Korea's unified state apparatus. It delegates its policy-making powers to the State Affairs Commission (SAC) and the president, its executive powers to the cabinet, and its judicial powers to the Supreme Court. In theory these organs are accountable to the SPA; in practice they, especially the SAC and SAC president, work highly independently from the SPA.

The standing organ of the Supreme People's Assembly is its Standing Committee, which has most of the powers of the SPA when it is in recess. The Standing Committee has the right to adopt new bills that gain force once approved by the SPA, which they always are; the Standing Committee also has the unique power to interpret the constitution, laws and regulations: it therefore may rescind decisions, directives and regulations of state organs it deems to conflict with the constitution or with acts of the SPA, the Standing Committee itself, the SAC, and acts issued by the SAC president. The chairman of the Standing Committee is North Korea's second-ranked official, followed by the SAC president.

==== State Affairs Commission ====
The State Affairs Commission of North Korea is the country's supreme state organ of policy-making, and ranks below its president as the third-highest state organ.

Recent constitutional amendments have centralized much power of the SAC directly into the president, constitutionally the head of state or supreme leader of North Korea and the commander-in-chief of the Korean People's Army. The president, elected by session of the SPA, is responsible for guiding state activities, the appointment and dismissal of the Chairman of the Supreme People's Assembly and the premier of the Cabinet, the removal of deputies to the SPA who have 'lost the trust of the people', and the veto of any laws, decrees, decisions or directives adopted by the SPA or its standing committee that 'do not conform to the state's development or the people's demands'.

==== Cabinet ====
The Cabinet of North Korea is the country's supreme state organ of administrative and executive power, headed by a premier who is elected by the SPA. The Cabinet acts as the government of North Korea and is responsible for the administration of the national economy, as well as the execution of decisions of the SPA, the Standing Committee, the SAC and the SAC president. The cabinet consists of the premier, eight vice premiers, a secretary-general, and the ministers and leaders of various ministries and government organs.

==== Supreme Court ====
The Supreme Court is the state's supreme judicial organ, and its president is elected by the SPA. Judicial procedures are handled by the Supreme Court, which also acts as the highest court of appeal. As with other communist states, the court is viewed as a political organ responsible for working within the bounds set by the SPA and the WPK. Therefore, courts carry out legal procedures related to not only criminal and civil matters, but also political cases as well. The legal system created by the SPA, and overseen by the Supreme Court, is a civil law system based on the Prussian model and influenced by Japanese traditions and communist legal theory.

=== Political ideology ===
Kimilsungism–Kimjongilism is the official ideology of North Korea and the WPK, and is the cornerstone of party works and government operations. Juche, part of the larger Kimilsungism–Kimjongilism along with Songun under Kim Jong Un, is viewed by the official North Korean line as an embodiment of Kim Il Sung's wisdom, an expression of his leadership, and an idea which provides "a complete answer to any question that arises in the struggle for national liberation". Juche was pronounced in 1955 in a speech called On Eliminating Dogmatism and Formalism and Establishing Juche in Ideological Work in order to emphasize a Korea-centered revolution. Its core tenets are economic self-sufficiency, military self-reliance and an independent foreign policy. The roots of Juche were made up of a complex mixture of factors, including the popularity of Kim Il Sung, the conflict with pro-Soviet and pro-Chinese dissenters, and Korea's centuries-long struggle for independence. Juche was introduced into the constitution in 1972.

Juche was initially promoted as a "creative application" of Marxism–Leninism, but in the mid-1970s, it was described by state propaganda in North Korea as "the only scientific thought... and most effective revolutionary theoretical structure that leads to the future of communist society". Juche eventually replaced Marxism–Leninism entirely by the 1980s, and in 1992 references to the latter were omitted from the constitution. The 2009 constitution dropped references to communism and elevated the Songun military first policy while explicitly confirming the position of Kim Jong Il. However, the constitution retains references to socialism. The WPK reasserted its commitment to communism in 2021. Juche's concepts of self-reliance have evolved with time and circumstances, but still provide the groundwork for the spartan austerity, sacrifice, and discipline demanded by the party.

=== Kim family ===
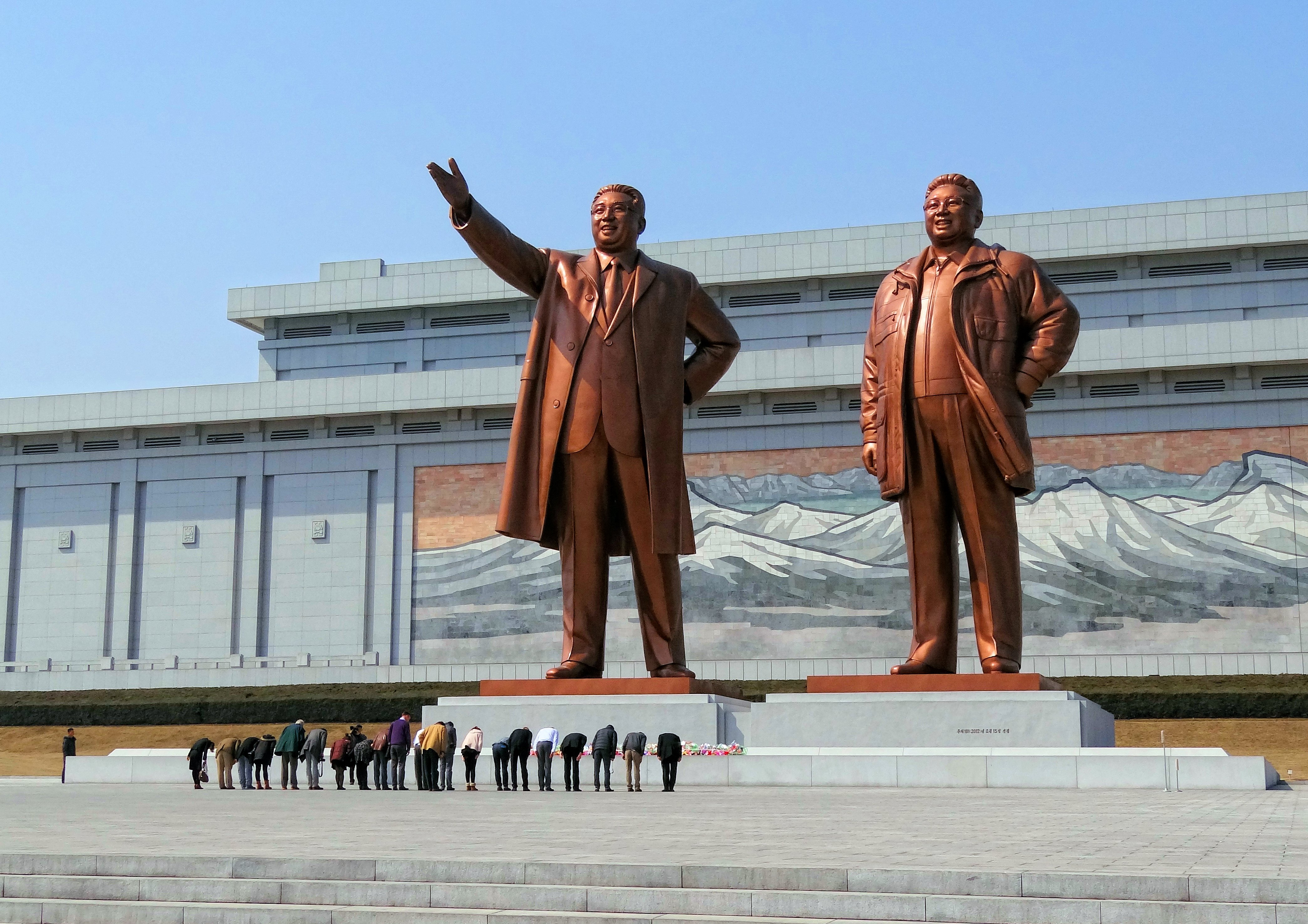
North Korean citizens paying respect to the statues of Kim Il Sung (left) and Kim Jong Il at the Mansudae Grand Monument

Since the founding of the nation, North Korea has been ruled by the Kim family, which in the country is referred to as the Mount Paektu Bloodline, with an extensive cult of personality surrounding them. It is a three-generation lineage descending from the country's first leader, Kim Il Sung, who developed a cult of personality closely tied to the state philosophy of Juche, which was later passed on to his successors: his son Kim Jong Il in 1994 and grandson Kim Jong Un in 2011. The cult of personality surrounding the Kim family has been crucial for legitimizing the family's hereditary succession. The control the North Korean government exercises over many aspects of the nation's culture is used to perpetuate the cult of personality. North Korea is governed by the Ten Principles for the Establishment of a Monolithic Ideological System, which establishes standards for governance and a guide for the behaviours of North Koreans. The principles mandate absolute obedience to the Kim family.

Kim Il Sung and Kim Jong Il are officially revered as the "eternal leaders of Korea". Several landmarks in North Korea are named for Kim Il Sung, including Kim Il Sung University, Kim Il Sung Stadium, and Kim Il Sung Square, while his birthday on 15 April is a public holiday called the Day of the Sun. Defectors have been quoted as saying that North Korean schools deify both father and son. Kim Jong Il's personality cult was inherited from his father. Kim Jong Il was often the center of attention throughout ordinary life. His birthday, called the Day of the Shining Star, is one of the most important public holidays in the country. Kim Jong Il's personality cult, although significant, was not as extensive as his father's. One point of view is that Kim Jong Il's cult of personality was solely out of respect for Kim Il Sung or out of fear of punishment for failure to pay homage, while North Korean government sources consider it genuine hero worship.

=== Administrative divisions ===
Map	Name	Chosŏn'gŭl	Administrative seat
	Directly governed city (직할시)		
	Pyongyang	평양	Chung-guyok
Special-level city (특별시)
	Kaesong	개성	Kaesong
Special cities (특별시)
	Rason	라선	Rajin-guyok
	Nampo	남포	Waudo-guyok
Provinces (도)
	South Pyongan	평안남도	Pyongsong
	North Pyongan	평안북도	Sinuiju
	Chagang	자강도	Kanggye
	South Hwanghae	황해남도	Haeju
	North Hwanghae	황해북도	Sariwon
	Kangwon	강원도	Wonsan
	South Hamgyong	함경남도	Hamhung
	North Hamgyong	함경북도	Chongjin
	Ryanggang	량강도	Hyesan

=== Foreign relations ===
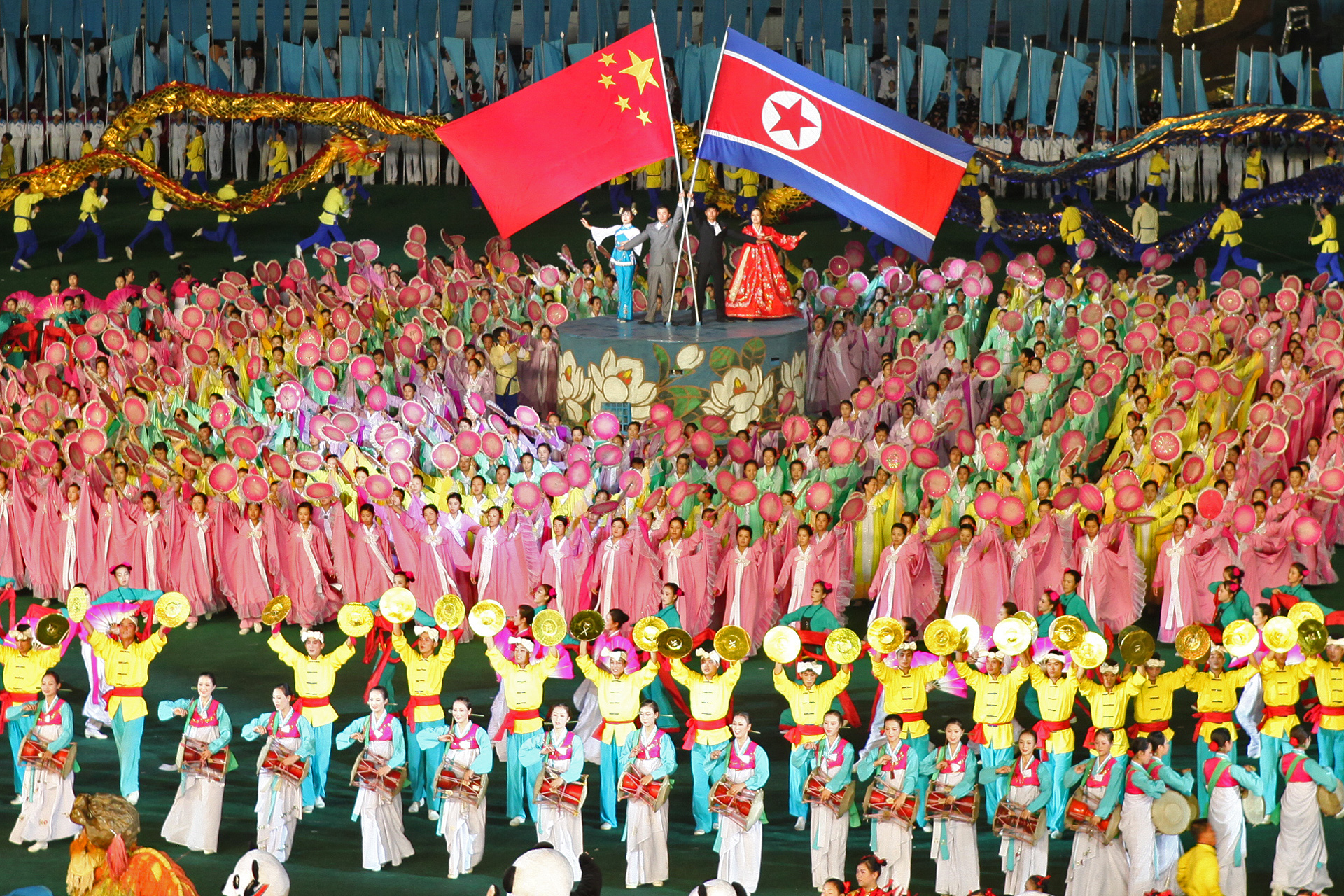
The close China-North Korea relationship is celebrated at the Arirang Mass Games in Pyongyang.

North Korea historically claimed to be the legitimate government of the entire Korean Peninsula and adjacent islands, a claim which was abandoned in 2024. North Korea joined the United Nations in 1991 together with South Korea. North Korea is also a member of the Non-Aligned Movement, G77 and the ASEAN Regional Forum. As of 2015, North Korea had diplomatic relations with 166 countries and embassies in 47 countries.

As a result of its isolation, North Korea is sometimes known as the "hermit kingdom", a term that originally referred to the isolationism in the latter part of the Joseon period. Initially, North Korea had diplomatic ties only with other communist countries, and even today, most of the foreign embassies accredited to North Korea are located in Beijing rather than in Pyongyang. In the 1960s and 1970s, it pursued an independent foreign policy, established relations with many developing countries, and joined the Non-Aligned Movement. In the late 1980s and the 1990s its foreign policy was thrown into turmoil with the collapse of the Soviet Bloc. Suffering an economic crisis, it closed a number of its embassies. At the same time, North Korea sought to build relations with developed free market countries.

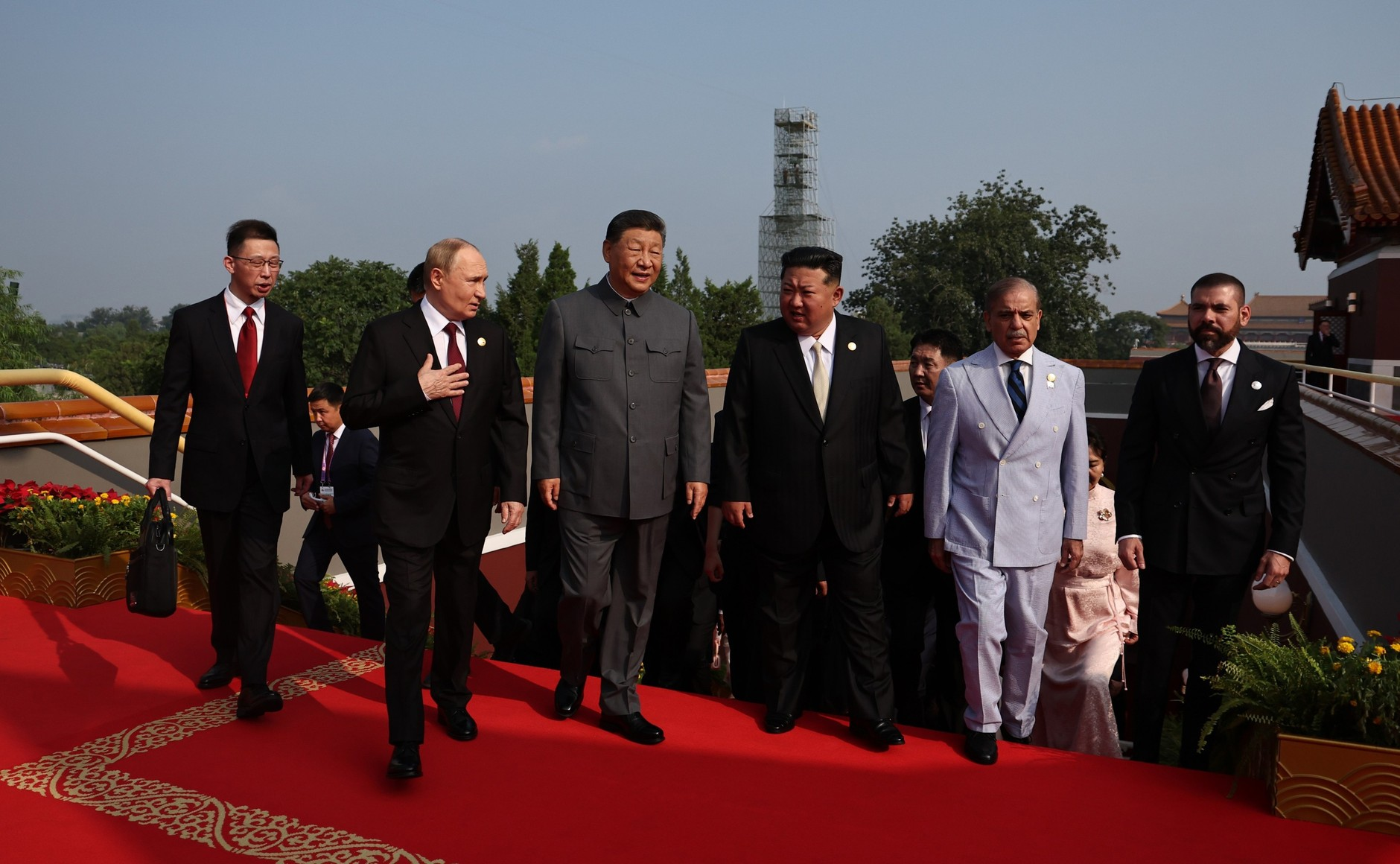
Kim Jong Un together with Russian president Vladimir Putin and Chinese leader Xi Jinping during the 2025 China Victory Day Parade

North Korea enjoys a close relationship with China which is often called North Korea's closest ally, and the two countries maintain a defense agreement. However, relations have sometimes been strained because of China's concerns about North Korea's nuclear program. North Korea has a close relationship with Russia and has voiced support for the 2022 Russian invasion of Ukraine, and the two countries signed a defense agreement in 2024. North Korea continues to have strong ties with several Southeast Asian countries such as Vietnam, Laos, Cambodia, and Indonesia. The kidnapping of at least 13 Japanese citizens by North Korean agents in the 1970s and the 1980s has had a detrimental effect on North Korea's relationship with Japan.

==== South Korea ====
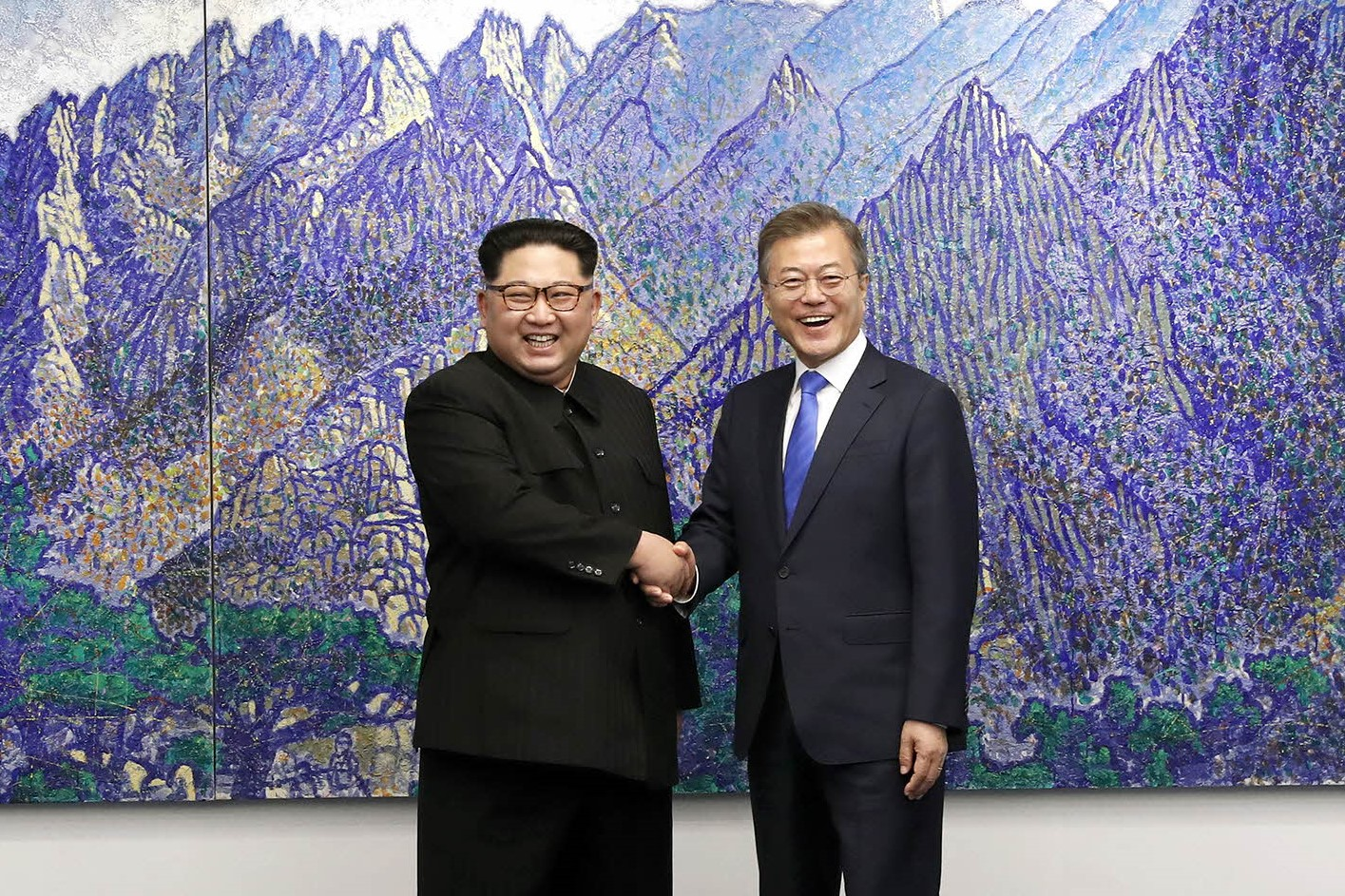
Kim Jong Un and South Korean President Moon Jae-in shake hands during the inter-Korean Summit, April 2018

The Korean Demilitarized Zone with South Korea remains the most heavily fortified border in the world. Inter-Korean relations are at the core of North Korean diplomacy and have seen numerous shifts in the last few decades. In 1972, North and South Korea agreed in principle to achieve reunification through peaceful means and without foreign interference. In 1980, Kim Il Sung proposed a federation between North and South Korea in which the respective political systems would initially remain. However, relations remained cool well until the early 1990s, with a brief period in the early 1980s when North Korea offered to provide flood relief to its southern neighbor. Although the offer was initially welcomed, talks over how to deliver the relief goods broke down and none of the promised aid ever crossed the border. The two countries also organized a reunion of 92 separated families.

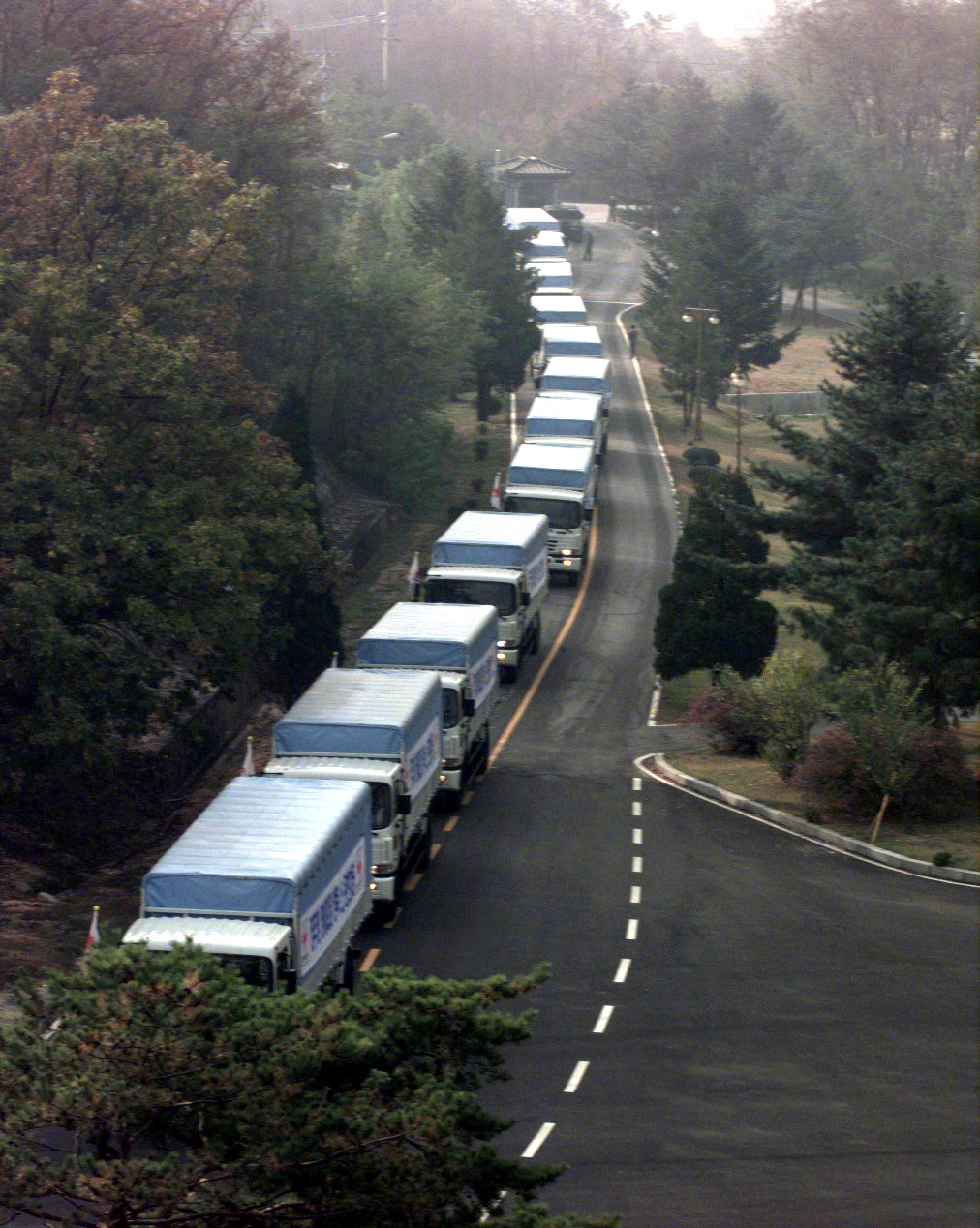
South Korean aid convoy entering North Korea through the Demilitarized Zone, 1998

The Sunshine Policy instituted by South Korean president Kim Dae-jung in 1998 was a watershed in inter-Korean relations. The culmination of the Sunshine Policy was the 2000 inter-Korean summit, when Kim Dae-jung visited Kim Jong Il in Pyongyang. Both North and South Korea signed the June 15th North–South Joint Declaration, in which both sides promised to seek peaceful reunification. In 2007, South Korean president Roh Moo-hyun and Kim Jong Il signed an eight-point peace agreement. However, relations worsened when South Korean president Lee Myung-bak adopted a more hard-line approach and suspended aid deliveries pending the de-nuclearization of the North. In 2009, North Korea responded by ending all of its previous agreements with the South. The next few years witnessed a string of hostilities, including the alleged North Korean involvement in the sinking of South Korean warship Cheonan, mutual ending of diplomatic talks, and North Korean artillery attack on Yeonpyeongdo.

In 2017, Moon Jae-in was elected president of South Korea with a promise to return to the Sunshine Policy. In 2018, a détente developed at the Winter Olympics held in South Korea. In April, South Korean president Moon Jae-in and Kim Jong Un met at the DMZ, and, in the Panmunjom Declaration, pledged to work for peace and nuclear disarmament. Relations deteriorated again under the Presidency of Yoon Suk Yeol. In 2024, North Korea officially announced through its leader Kim Jong Un that it would no longer seek reunification with South Korea, identifying the country as a "hostile state".

=== Military ===
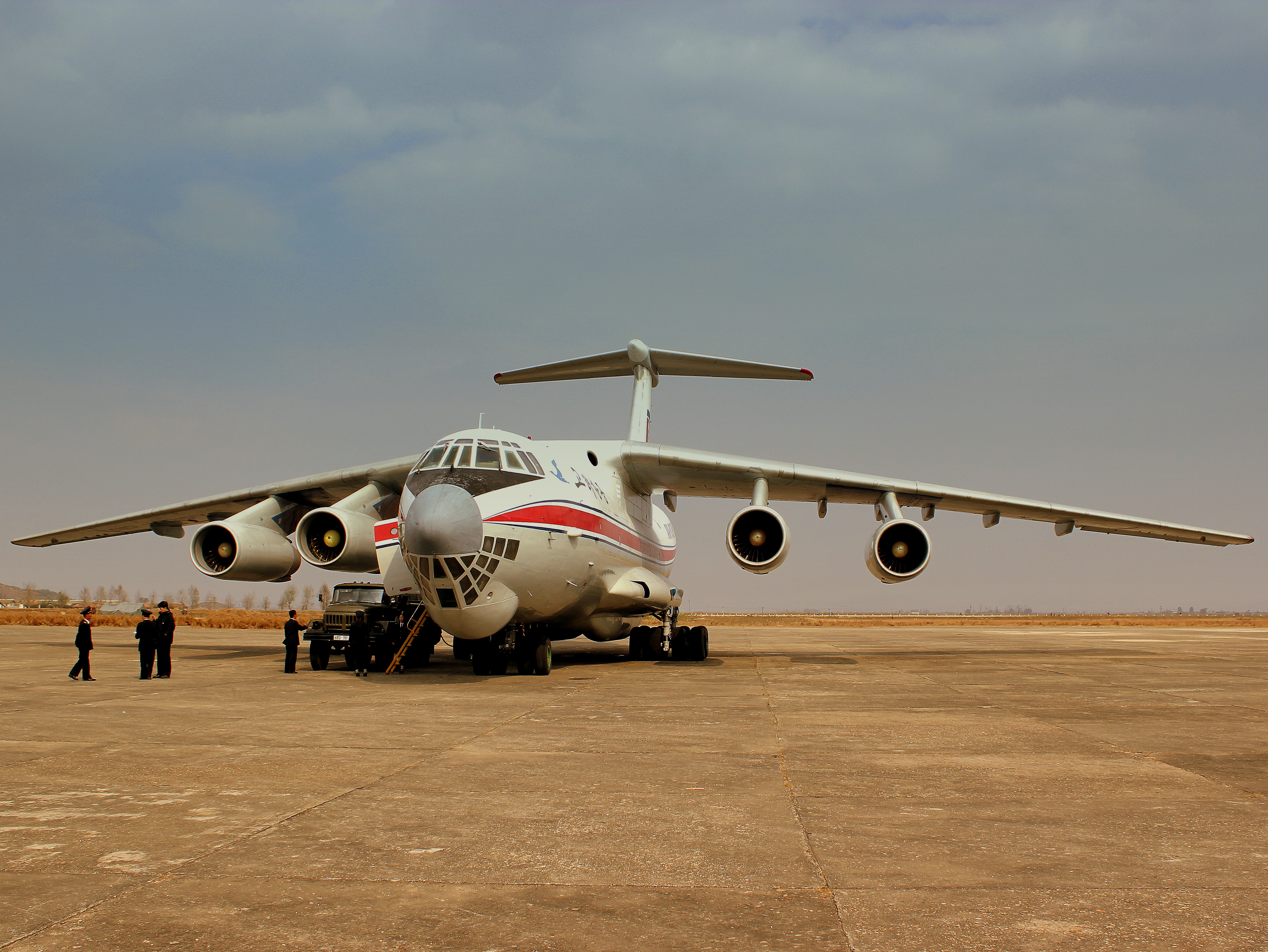
Ilyushin Il-76 strategic military airlifter used by Air Koryo

The Korean People's Army (KPA) is the main armed forces of North Korea, under the direct control of the Workers' Party of Korea. It is estimated to comprise 1,280,000 active and 6,300,000 reserve and paramilitary troops, making it one of the largest military institutions in the world. With an active duty army consisting of 4.9% of its population, North Korea maintains the fourth largest active military force in the world. About 20 percent of men aged 17–54 serve in the regular armed forces, and approximately one in every 25 citizens is an enlisted soldier. The KPA is divided into five branches: Ground Force, Navy, Air Force, Special Operations Force, and Strategic Force. Command of the KPA lies in both the WPK Central Military Commission and the State Affairs Commission, which controls the Ministry of Defence. Of all the KPA's branches, the Ground Force is the largest, comprising approximately one million personnel, while the Navy operates the largest submarine fleet in the world. The KPA's Special Operation Force is also the world's largest special forces unit.

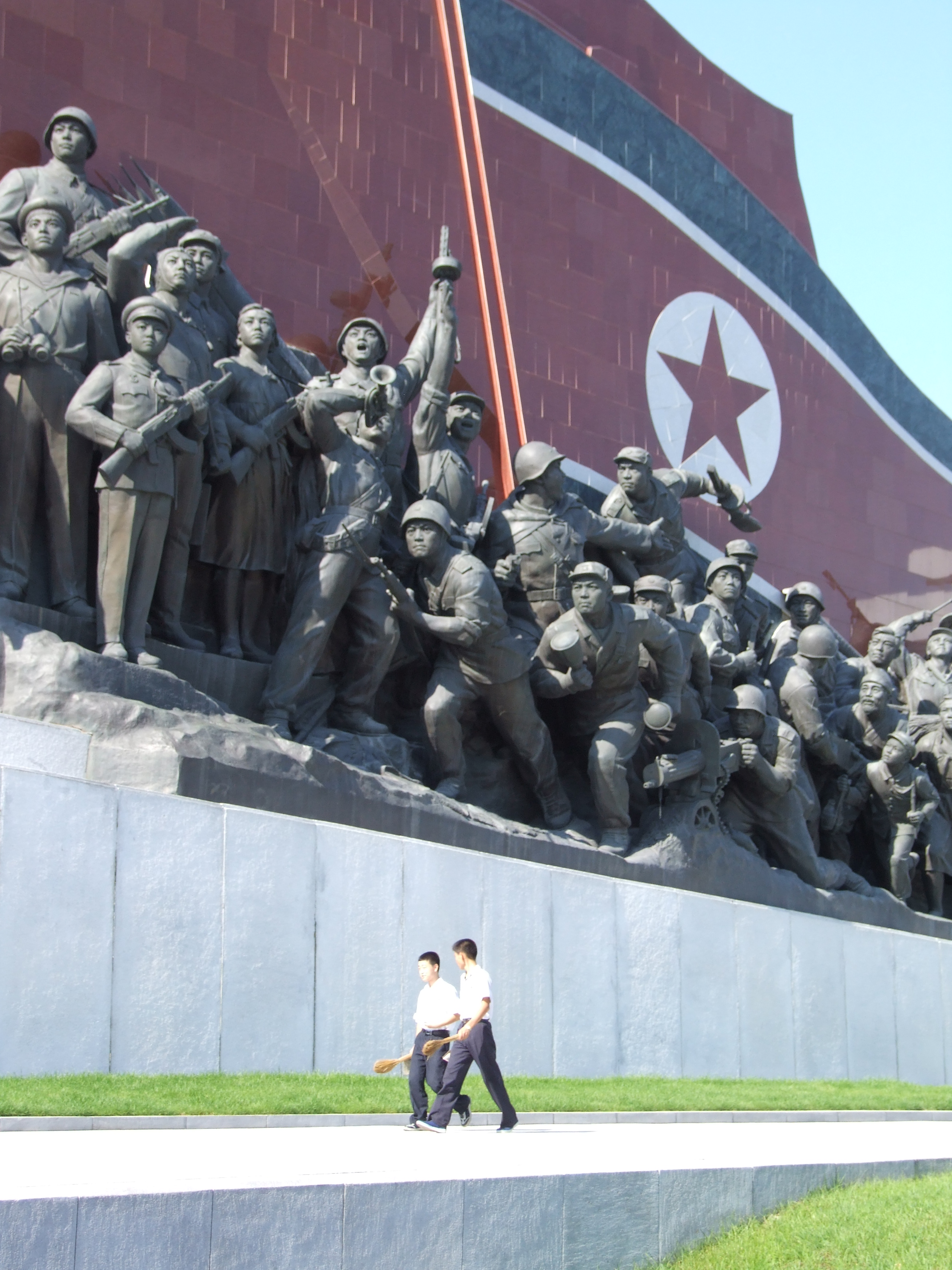
The Memorial of Soldiers at the Mansudae Grand Monument

The sale of weapons to North Korea by other states is prohibited by UN sanctions, and the KPA's conventional capabilities are limited by a number of factors including obsolete equipment, insufficient fuel supplies and a shortage of digital command and control assets. To compensate for these deficiencies, the KPA has deployed a wide range of asymmetric warfare technologies including anti-personnel blinding lasers, GPS jammers, midget submarines and human torpedoes, stealth paint, and cyberwarfare units. In 2015, North Korea was reported to employ 6,000 sophisticated computer security personnel in a cyberwarfare unit operating out of China. Much of the equipment in use by the KPA is engineered and manufactured by the domestic defense industry. The defense industry is capable of producing a full range of weapons, and may even have limited jet aircraft manufacturing capacity. According to North Korean state media, military expenditure amounted to 15.8 percent of the state budget in 2010. The U.S. State Department has estimated that North Korea's military spending averaged 23% of its GDP from 2004 to 2014, the highest level in the world.

North Korea is a nuclear-armed state, though the nature and strength of the country's arsenal is uncertain. As of June 2024, North Korea was estimated to possess 50 nuclear warheads. Delivery capabilities are provided by the Rocket Force, which has ballistic missiles with a range of up to 15,000 km (9,300 mi). As a result of its nuclear and missile tests, North Korea has been sanctioned under multiple United Nations Security Council resolutions. According to a 2004 South Korean assessment, North Korea also possesses a stockpile of chemical weapons, as well as the ability to cultivate and produce biological weapons.

=== Human rights ===
Kwalliso (political labor camp) locations known to be currently in operation in North Korea (As of 2026; Pukch'ang and Kaechon camps are around 3 km (1.9 mi) apart). Conditions are known to be atrocious; they are the most severe punishment besides capital punishment.

The state of human rights in North Korea has been widely condemned. A 2014 UN inquiry into the DPRK's human rights record found evidence for "systematic, widespread and gross human rights violations" and stated that "the gravity, scale and nature of these violations reveal a state that does not have any parallel in the contemporary world", with Amnesty International and Human Rights Watch holding similar views. The UN inquiry has accused North Korea of crimes against humanity. North Koreans have been referred to as "some of the world's most brutalized people" by Human Rights Watch, because of the severe restrictions placed on their political and economic freedoms. There are restrictions on the freedom of association, expression and movement; arbitrary detention, torture and other ill-treatment result in death and execution. Citizens in North Korea are generally not permitted to leave the country at will and its government denies access to UN human rights observers.

The Ministry of State Security extrajudicially apprehends and imprisons those accused of political crimes without due process. People perceived as hostile to the government, such as Christians or critics of the leadership, are deported to re-education camps or political labor camps (kwalliso) without trial, often with their whole family and mostly without any chance of being released. Forced labor is part of an established system of political repression. Based on satellite images and defector testimonies, an estimated 200,000 prisoners are held in six large prison camps, where they are made to work to right their wrongdoings. Supporters of the government who deviate from the government line are subject to reeducation in sections of labor camps set aside for that purpose. Those who are deemed politically rehabilitated may reassume responsible government positions on their release. The International Coalition to Stop Crimes Against Humanity in North Korea (ICNK) estimates that over 10,000 people die in North Korean prison camps every year.

The North Korean population is strictly managed by the state and all aspects of daily life are subordinated to party and state planning. According to US government reports, employment is managed by the party on the basis of political reliability, and travel is tightly controlled by the Ministry of People's Security. The US State Department says that North Koreans do not have a choice in the jobs they work and are not free to change jobs at will. With 1,100,000 people in modern slavery (via forced labor), North Korea is ranked highest in the world in terms of the percentage of the population that is enslaved, at 10.4 percent according to the Walk Free's 2018 Global Slavery Index. North Korea is the only country in the world that has not explicitly criminalized some form of modern slavery. A United Nations report listed slavery among the crimes against humanity occurring in North Korea. According to the US State Department, the North Korean government does not fully comply with the minimum standards for the elimination of human trafficking and is not making significant efforts to do so. North Korea has trafficked thousands of its own citizens allegedly as forced laborers to other countries. Most of the laborers' earnings are kept by Pyongyang.

The North Korean government rejects the human rights abuse claims, calling them a smear campaign and a human rights racket made to topple the government. In a 2014 report to the UN, North Korea dismissed accusations of atrocities as wild rumors. The government, however, admitted some human rights issues related to living conditions and stated that it is working to improve them.

=== Illicit activities ===
The North Korean government has been accused of engaging in illicit activities to finance its operations. The US government in particular has been critical of North Korea and accused its government of manufacturing and distributing, among other things, illegal drugs, counterfeit consumer goods, counterfeit pharmecuticals, and counterfeit currency (especially the United States dollar). South Korea and the US have jointly investigated North Korea for illicit activities committed abroad and online, such as cybertheft and employment fraud (specifically by North Korean IT workers working abroad).

== Economy ==
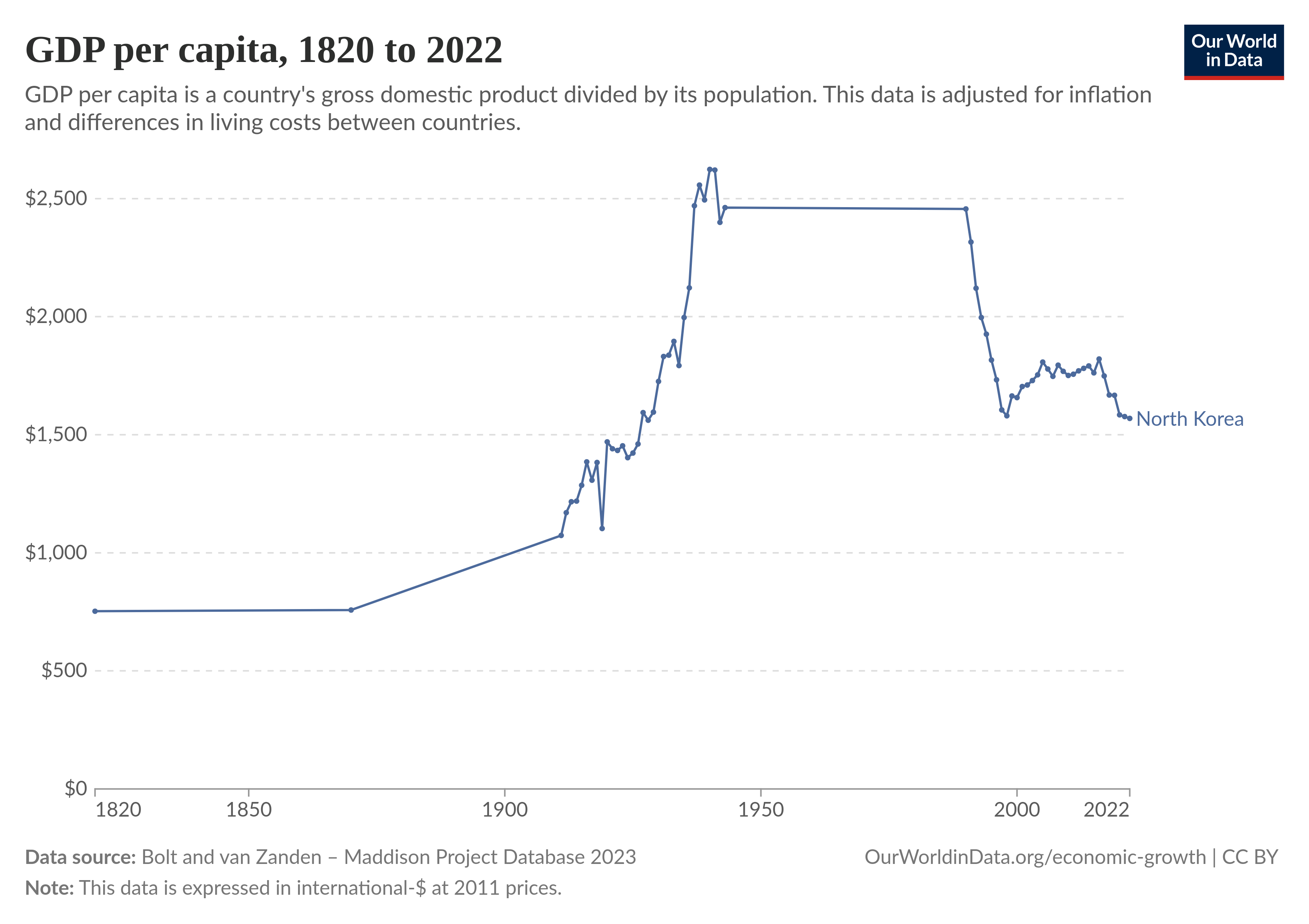
GDP per capita estimates from 1820 to 2022

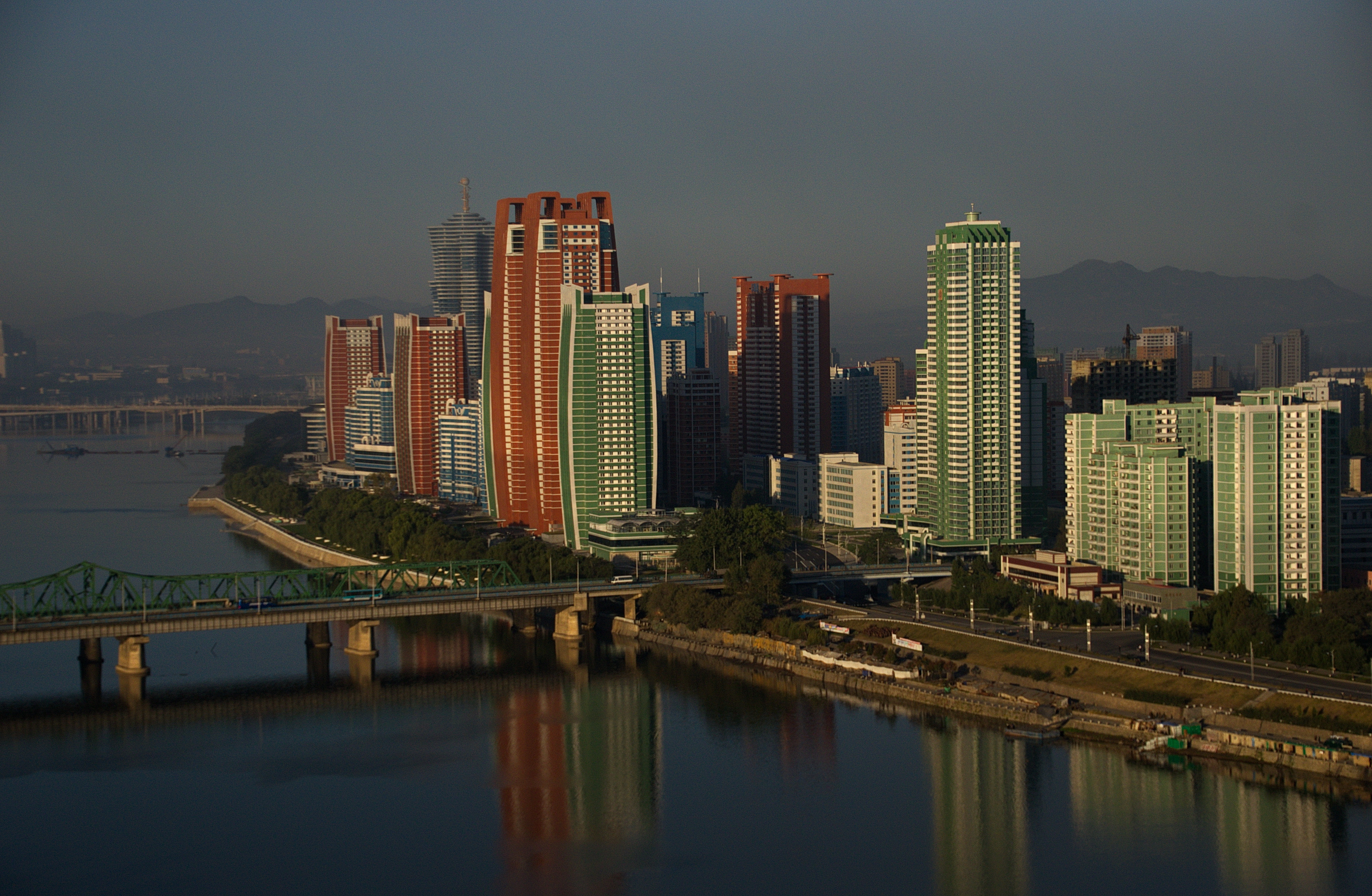
Mirae Scientists Street in Pyongyang

North Korea has maintained one of the most closed and centralized economies in the world since the 1940s. For several decades, it followed the Soviet pattern of five-year plans with the ultimate goal of achieving self-sufficiency. Extensive Soviet and Chinese support allowed North Korea to rapidly recover from the Korean War and register very high growth rates. Systematic inefficiency began to arise around 1960, when the economy shifted from the extensive to the intensive development stage. The shortage of skilled labor, energy, arable land and transportation significantly impeded long-term growth and resulted in consistent failure to meet planning objectives. The major slowdown of the economy contrasted with South Korea, which surpassed the North in terms of absolute GDP and per capita income by the 1980s. North Korea declared the last seven-year plan unsuccessful in December 1993 and thereafter stopped announcing plans.

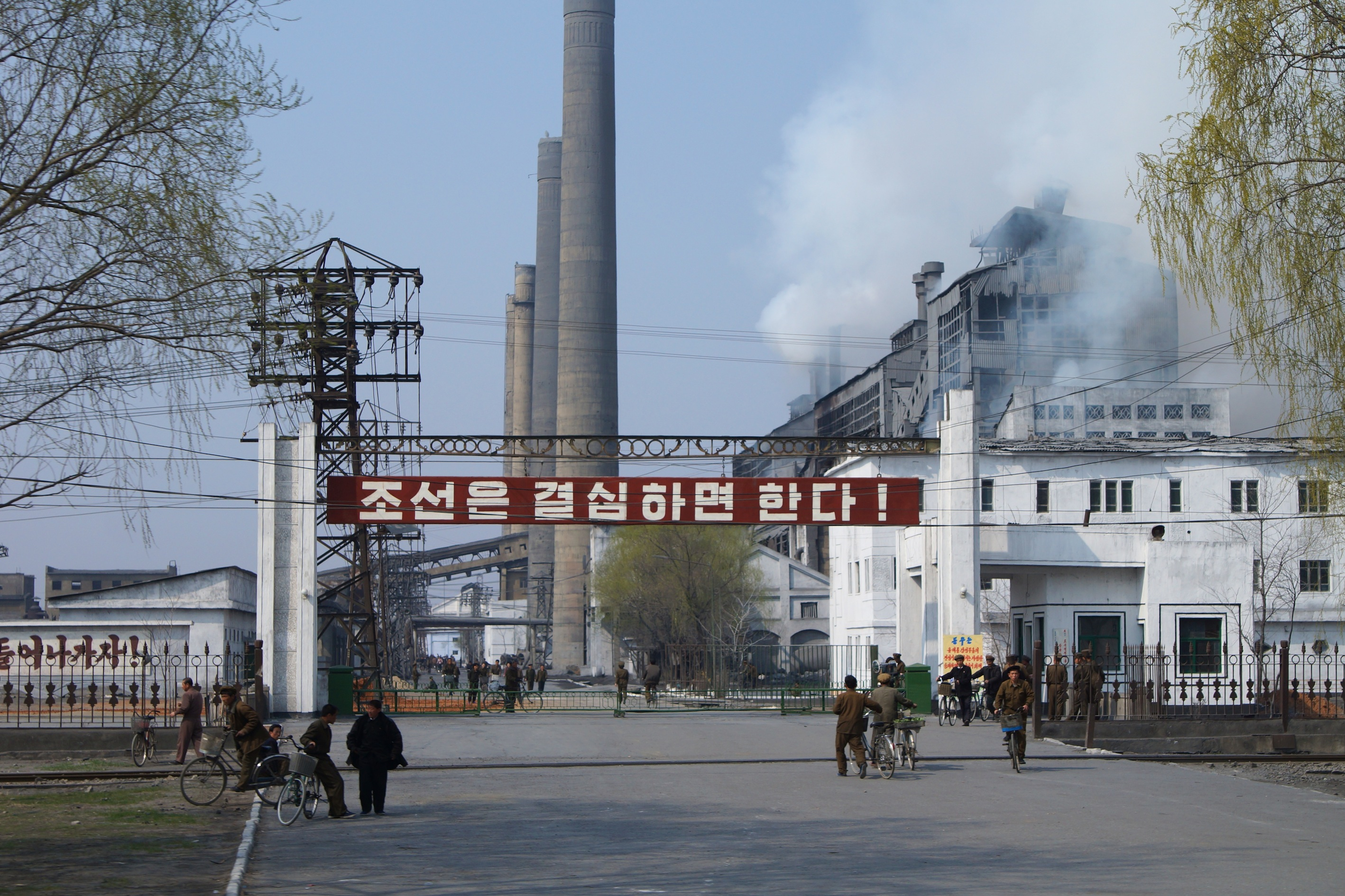
An industrial plant in Hamhung

The loss of Eastern Bloc trading partners and a series of natural disasters throughout the 1990s caused severe hardships, including widespread famine. By 2000, the situation improved owing to a massive international food assistance effort, but the economy continues to suffer from food shortages, dilapidated infrastructure and a critically low energy supply. In an attempt to recover from the collapse, the government began structural reforms in 1998 that formally legalized private ownership of assets and decentralized control over production. A second round of reforms in 2002 led to an expansion of market activities, partial monetization, flexible prices and salaries, and the introduction of incentives and accountability techniques. Despite these changes, North Korea remains a command economy where the state owns almost all means of production and development priorities are defined by the government.

North Korea has the structural profile of a relatively industrialized country where nearly half of the gross domestic product is generated by industry and human development is at medium levels. Purchasing power parity (PPP) GDP is estimated at $40 billion, with a very low per capita value of $1,800. In 2024, gross national income per capita was $1,317, compared to $36,965 in South Korea. Surveys of North Korean defectors show the most common reasons for leaving are economic prospects and quality of life.

The North Korean won is the national currency, issued by the Central Bank of the Democratic People's Republic of Korea. As of 2023, China is the biggest trading partner of North Korea, accounting for more than 74% of exports and 97% of imports.

The economy is heavily nationalized. Food and housing are extensively subsidized by the state; education and healthcare are free; and the payment of taxes was officially abolished in 1974. A variety of goods are available in department stores and supermarkets in Pyongyang, though most of the population relies on small-scale jangmadang markets. In 2009, the government attempted to stem the expanding free market by banning jangmadang and the use of foreign currency, heavily devaluing the won and restricting the convertibility of savings in the old currency, but the resulting inflation spike and rare public protests caused a reversal of these policies. Private trade is dominated by women because most men are required to be present at their workplace, even though many state-owned enterprises are non-operational.

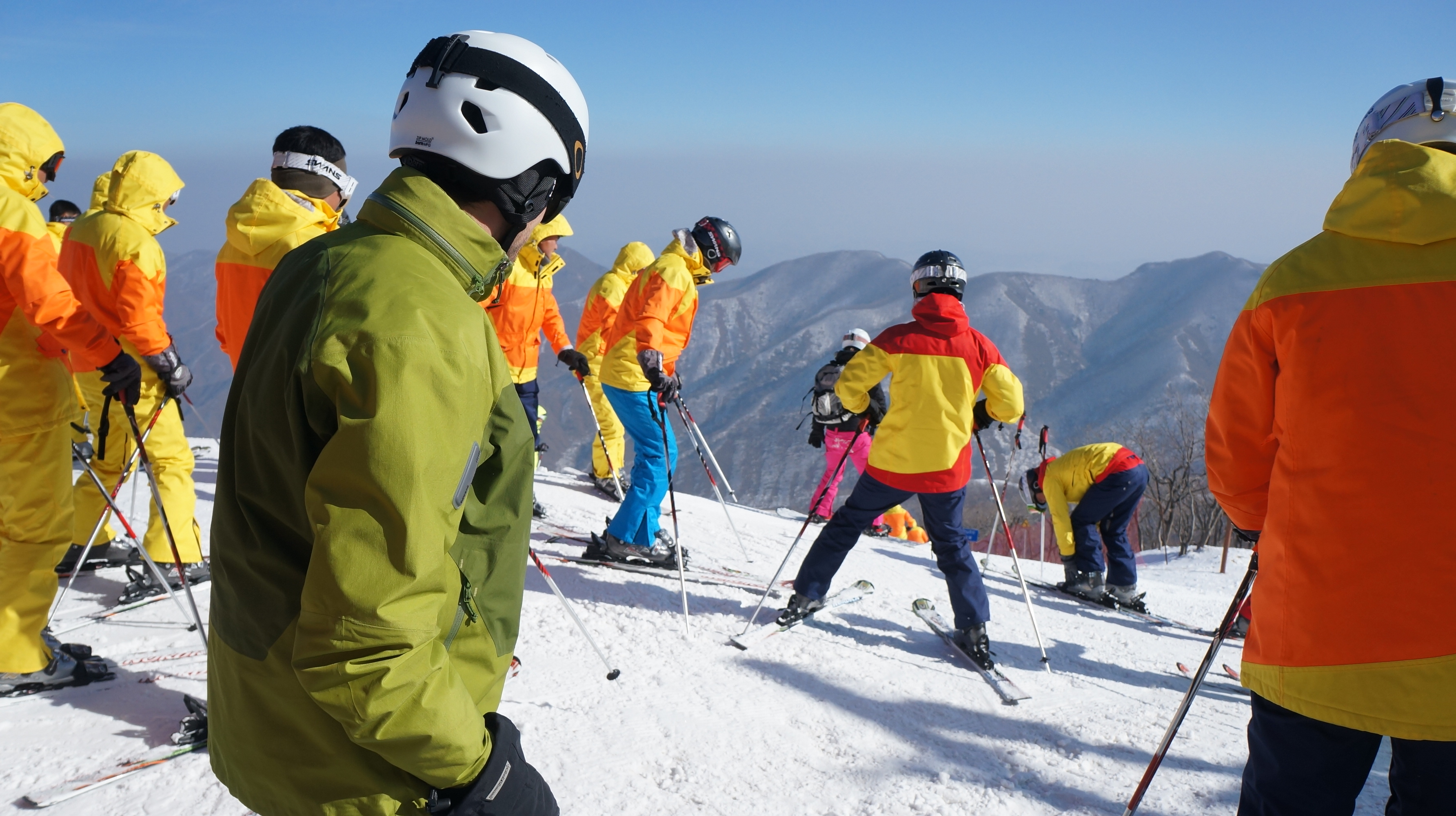
Foreign tourists in Masikryong Ski Resort

Industry and services employ 65% of North Korea's 17.6 million labor force. Major industries include machine building, military equipment, chemicals, mining, metallurgy, textiles, food processing and tourism. Iron ore and coal production are among the few sectors where North Korea performs significantly better than its southern neighbor—it produces about 10 times more of each resource. Using ex-Romanian drilling rigs, several oil exploration companies have confirmed significant oil reserves in the North Korean shelf of the Sea of Japan, and in areas south of Pyongyang. The agricultural sector was shattered by the natural disasters of the 1990s. Its 3,500 cooperatives and state farms were moderately successful until the mid-1990s but now experience chronic fertilizer and equipment shortages. Rice, corn, soybeans and potatoes are some of the primary crops. A significant contribution to the food supply comes from commercial fishing and aquaculture. Smaller specialized farms, managed by the state, also produce high-value crops, including ginseng, honey, matsutake and herbs for traditional Korean and Chinese medicine. The North Korean government has promoted the growth of tourism, with North Korea aiming to increase the number of foreign visitors through projects like the Masikryong Ski Resort. North Korea's economy started to significantly improve during the mid-2020s, aided by arms sales to Russia and expanding trade with China. From the summer of 2023 to the end of 2025, arms sales to Russia generated more than $10 billion for North Korea. Economic changes included increased number of stores in Pyongyang, a construction boom, as well as increasing digitization and a boom in sales of electric vehicles.

=== Transportation ===
Transport infrastructure in North Korea includes railways, highways, water and air routes, but rail transport is by far the most widespread. North Korea has some 5,200 kilometers (3,200 mi) of railways mostly in standard gauge which carry 80% of annual passenger traffic and 86% of freight, but electricity shortages undermine their efficiency. Construction of a high-speed railway connecting Kaesong, Pyongyang and Sinuiju with speeds exceeding 200 kilometers per hour (120 mph) was approved in 2013. North Korea connects with the Trans-Siberian Railway through Rajin.

Road transport is very limited—only 724 kilometers (450 mi) of the 25,554 kilometers (15,879 mi) road network are paved, and maintenance on most roads is poor. Only 2% of the freight capacity is supported by river and sea transport, and air traffic is negligible. All port facilities are ice-free and host a merchant fleet of 158 vessels. 81 airports and 8 helipads are operational and the largest serve the state-run airline, Air Koryo. Cars are relatively rare, though private car ownership has increased in the 2020s. Bicycles are common. There is only one international airport—Pyongyang International Airport—serviced by Russia and China (see List of public airports in North Korea)

=== Energy ===
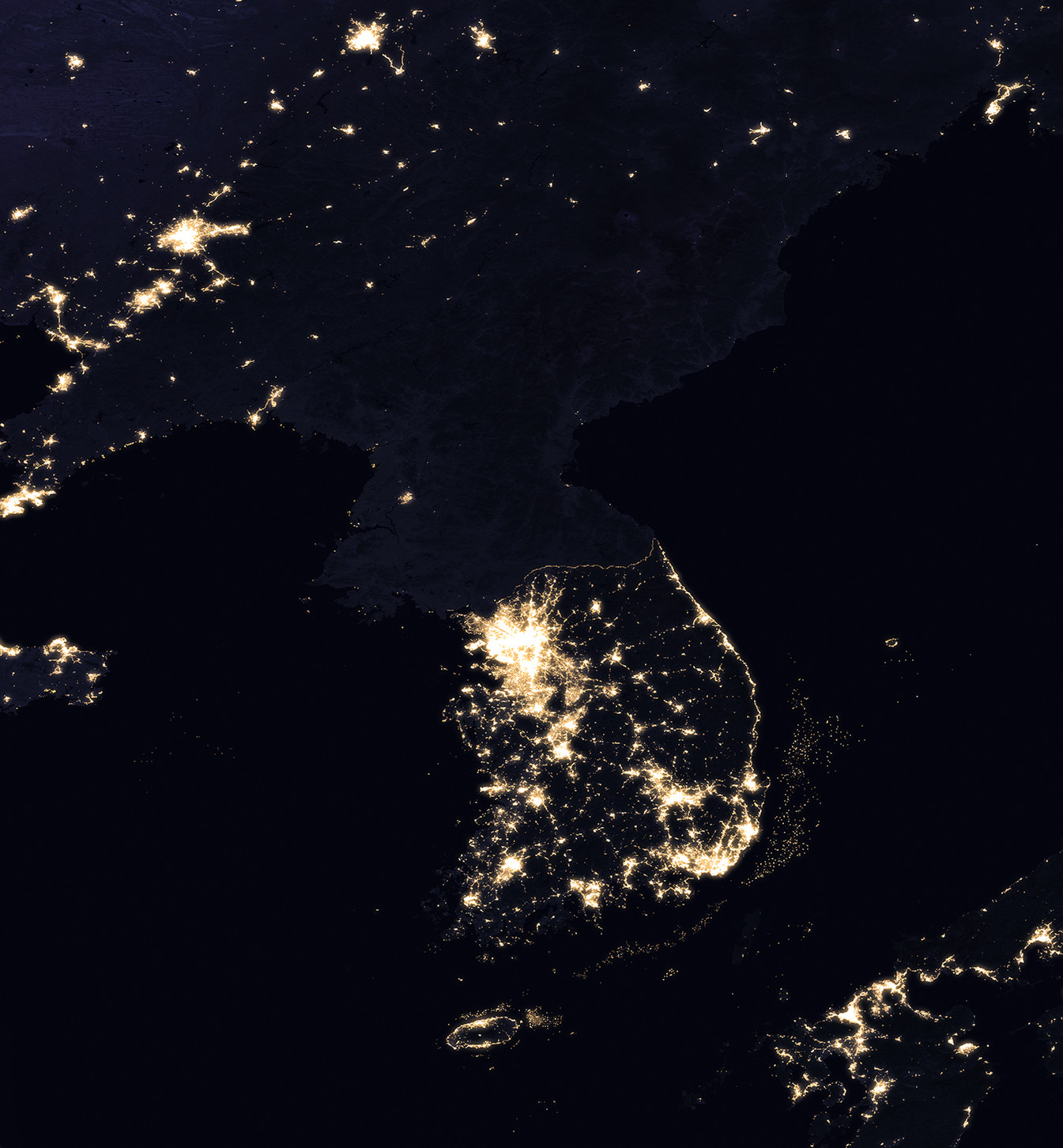
2017 composite satellite image of the Korean Peninsula at night, showing the difference in lighting between North and South Korea

North Korea's energy infrastructure is obsolete and in disrepair. Power shortages are chronic and would not be alleviated even by electricity imports because the poorly maintained grid causes significant losses during transmission. Coal accounts for 70% of primary energy production, followed by hydroelectric power with 17%. The government under Kim Jong Un has increased emphasis on renewable energy projects like wind farms, solar parks, solar heating and biomass. North Korea's long-term objective is to curb fossil fuel usage and reach an output of 5 million kilowatts from renewable sources by 2044, up from its current total of 430,000 kilowatts from all sources. Wind power is projected to satisfy 15% of the country's total energy demand under this strategy. North Korea also strives to develop its own civilian nuclear program. These efforts are under much international dispute due to their military applications and concerns about safety.

=== Science and technology ===
R&D efforts are concentrated at the State Academy of Sciences, which runs 40 research institutes, 200 smaller research centers, a scientific equipment factory and six publishing houses. The government considers science and technology to be directly linked to economic development. A five-year scientific plan emphasizing IT, biotechnology, nanotechnology, marine technology, and laser and plasma research was carried out in the early 2000s.

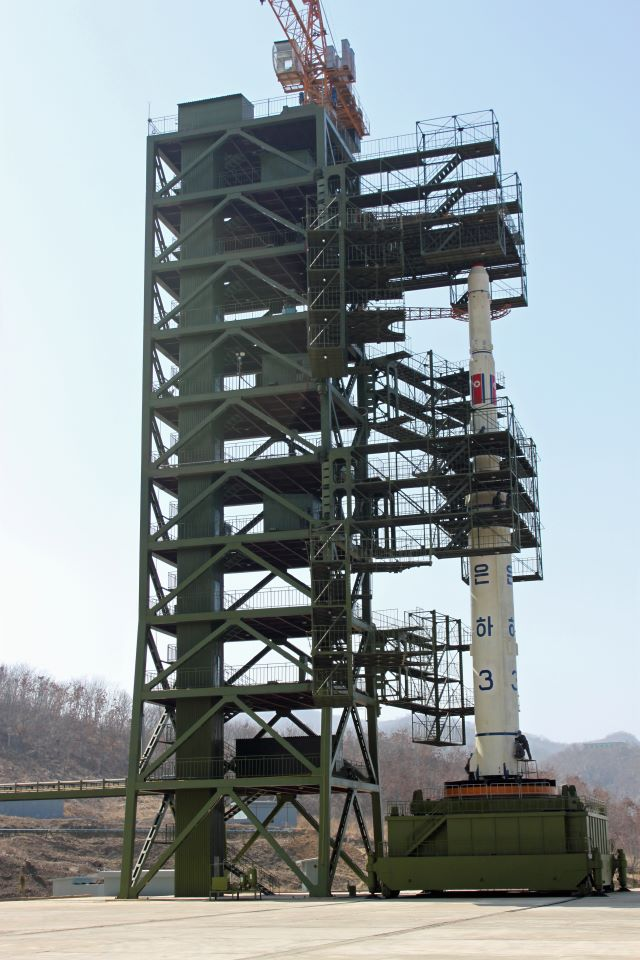
Unha-3 space launch vehicle at Sohae Satellite Launching Station

Significant resources have been allocated to the national space program, which is managed by the National Aerospace Technology Administration (formerly managed by the Korean Committee of Space Technology until April 2013). Domestically produced launch vehicles and the Kwangmyŏngsŏng satellite class are launched from two spaceports, the Tonghae Satellite Launching Ground and the Sohae Satellite Launching Station. After four failed attempts, North Korea became the tenth spacefaring nation with the launch of Kwangmyŏngsŏng-3 Unit 2 in December 2012, which successfully reached orbit but was believed to be crippled and non-operational. It joined the Outer Space Treaty in 2009 and has stated its intentions to undertake crewed and Moon missions. The government insisted the space program is for peaceful purposes, but the United States, Japan, South Korea and other countries maintained that it serves to advance North Korea's ballistic missile program. On 7 February 2016, a statement broadcast on Korean Central Television said that a near Earth observation satellite, Kwangmyongsong-4, had successfully been put into orbit.

Usage of communication technology is controlled by the Ministry of Posts and Telecommunications. An adequate nationwide fiber-optic telephone system with 1.18 million fixed lines and expanding mobile coverage is in place. Mobile phone usage is increasingly widespread among North Koreans. Cellular coverage is available with a 4G network operated by Koryolink and Kangsong NET. The number of subscribers has increased from 3,000 in 2002 to almost two million in 2013. International calls through either fixed or cellular service are restricted, and mobile Internet is not available. Internet access itself is limited to a handful of elite users and scientists. Instead, North Korea has a walled garden intranet system called Kwangmyong, which is maintained and monitored by the Korea Computer Center. Its content is limited to state media, chat services, message boards, an e-mail service and an estimated 1,000–5,500 websites. Computers employ the Red Star OS, an operating system derived from Linux, with a user shell visually similar to that of macOS.

== Demographics ==
Development of life expectancy in North Korea and South Korea

With the exception of a small Chinese community and a few ethnic Japanese, North Korea's 25,971,909 people are ethnically homogeneous. Demographic experts in the 20th century estimated that the population would grow to 25.5 million by 2000 and 28 million by 2010, but this increase never occurred due to the North Korean famine. The famine, which began in 1995 and lasted for three years, resulted in the deaths of an estimated 240,000 to 420,000 North Koreans.

International donors led by the United States initiated shipments of food through the World Food Programme in 1997 to combat the famine. The situation gradually improved: the number of malnourished children declined from 60% in 1998 to 28% in 2013. Domestic food production almost recovered to the recommended annual level of 5.37 million tons of cereal equivalent in 2013, but the World Food Programme reported a continuing lack of dietary diversity and access to fats and proteins. By the mid-2010s national levels of severe wasting, an indication of famine-like conditions, were lower than in other low-income countries and about on par with developing nations in the Pacific and East Asia. Children's health and nutrition is significantly better on a number of indicators than in many other Asian countries.

The famine had a significant impact on the population growth rate, which declined to 0.9% annually in 2002. It was 0.4% in 2024. Late marriages after military service, limited housing space and long hours of work or political studies further exhaust the population and reduce growth. The national birth rate is 13.2 births per year per 1,000 population. Two-thirds of households consist of extended families mostly living in two-room units. Marriage is virtually universal and divorce is extremely rare.

Largest cities or towns in North Korea 2008 Census
Rank	Name	Administrative division	Pop.	Rank	Name	Administrative division	Pop.
1	Pyongyang	Pyongyang Capital City	3,255,288	11	Sunchon	South Pyongan	297,317
2	Hamhung	South Hamgyong	768,551	12	Pyongsong	South Pyongan	284,386
3	Chongjin	North Hamgyong	667,929	13	Haeju	South Hwanghae	273,300
4	Nampo	South Pyongan Province	366,815	14	Kanggye	Chagang	251,971
5	Wonsan	Kangwon	363,127	15	Anju	South Pyongan	240,117
6	Sinuiju	North Pyongan	359,341	16	Tokchon	South Pyongan	237,133
7	Tanchon	South Hamgyong	345,875	17	Kimchaek	North Hamgyong	207,299
8	Kaechon	South Pyongan	319,554	18	Rason	Rason Special Economic Zone	196,954
9	Kaesong	North Hwanghae	308,440	19	Kusong	North Pyongan	196,515
10	Sariwon	North Hwanghae	307,764	20	Hyesan	Ryanggang	192,680

=== Language ===
North Korea shares the Korean language with South Korea, although some dialectal differences exist within both Koreas. North Koreans refer to their Pyongan dialect as munhwaŏ ("cultured language") as opposed to the dialects of South Korea, especially the Seoul dialect or p'yojun'ŏ ("standard language"), which are viewed as decadent because of its use of loanwords from Chinese and European languages (particularly English). Words of Chinese, Manchu or Western origin have been eliminated from munhwa along with the usage of Chinese hanja characters. Written language uses only the Chosŏn'gŭl (Hangul) phonetic alphabet, developed under Sejong the Great (1418–1450).

=== Religion ===
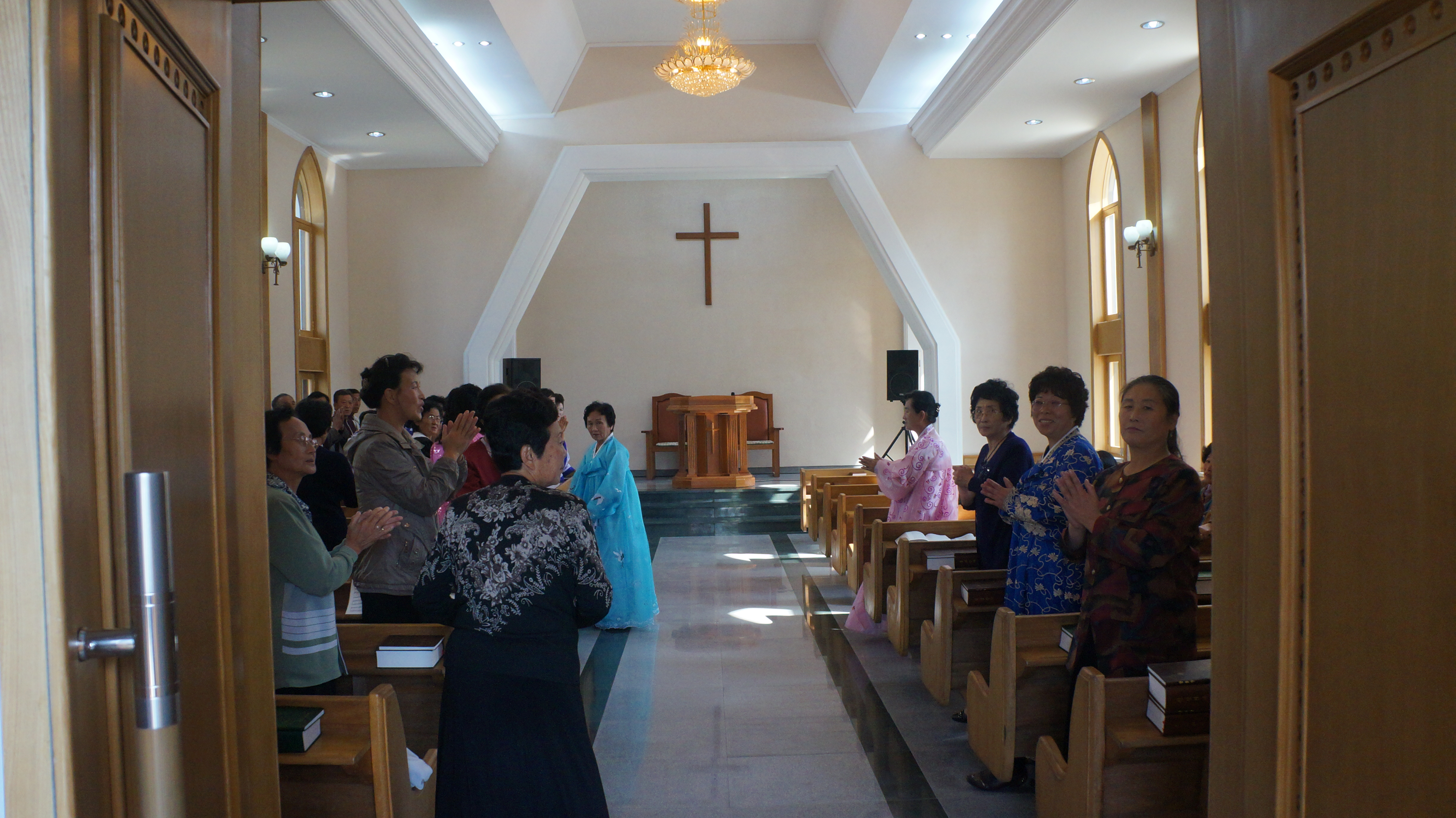
Chilgol Church in Pyongyang, where Kang Pan Sok—the mother of the late supreme leader Kim Il Sung—served as a Presbyterian deaconess

North Korea is officially an atheist state. Its constitution guarantees freedom of religion under Article 68, but this principle is limited by the requirement that religion may not be used as a pretext to harm the state, introduce foreign forces, or harm the existing social order. Religious practice is therefore restricted, despite nominal constitutional protections. Proselytizing is also prohibited due to concerns about foreign influence. The number of Christian churchgoers nonetheless more than doubled between the 1980s and the early 2000s due to the recruitment of Christians who previously worshipped privately or in small house churches. The Open Doors mission, a Protestant group based in the United States and founded during the Cold War era, claims the most severe persecution of Christians in the world occurs in North Korea.

There are no known official statistics of religions in North Korea. According to a 2020 study published by the Centre for the Study of World Christianity, 73% of the population are irreligious (58% agnostic, 15% atheist), 13% practice Chondoism, 12% practice Korean shamanism, 1.5% are Buddhist, and less than 0.5% practice another religion such as Christianity, Islam, or Chinese folk religion. Amnesty International has expressed concerns about religious persecution in North Korea. Pro-North groups such as the Paektu Solidarity Alliance deny these claims, saying that multiple religious facilities exist across the nation. Some religious places of worship are located in foreign embassies in the capital city of Pyongyang. Five Christian churches built with state funds stand in Pyongyang: three Protestant, one Roman Catholic, and one Russian Orthodox. Critics claim these are showcases for foreigners.

Buddhism and Confucianism still influence spirituality. Chondoism ("Heavenly Way") is an indigenous syncretic belief combining elements of Korean shamanism, Buddhism, Taoism and Catholicism that is officially represented by the WPK-controlled Chondoist Chongu Party. Chondoism is recognized and favored by the government, being seen as an indigenous form of "revolutionary religion".

=== Education ===
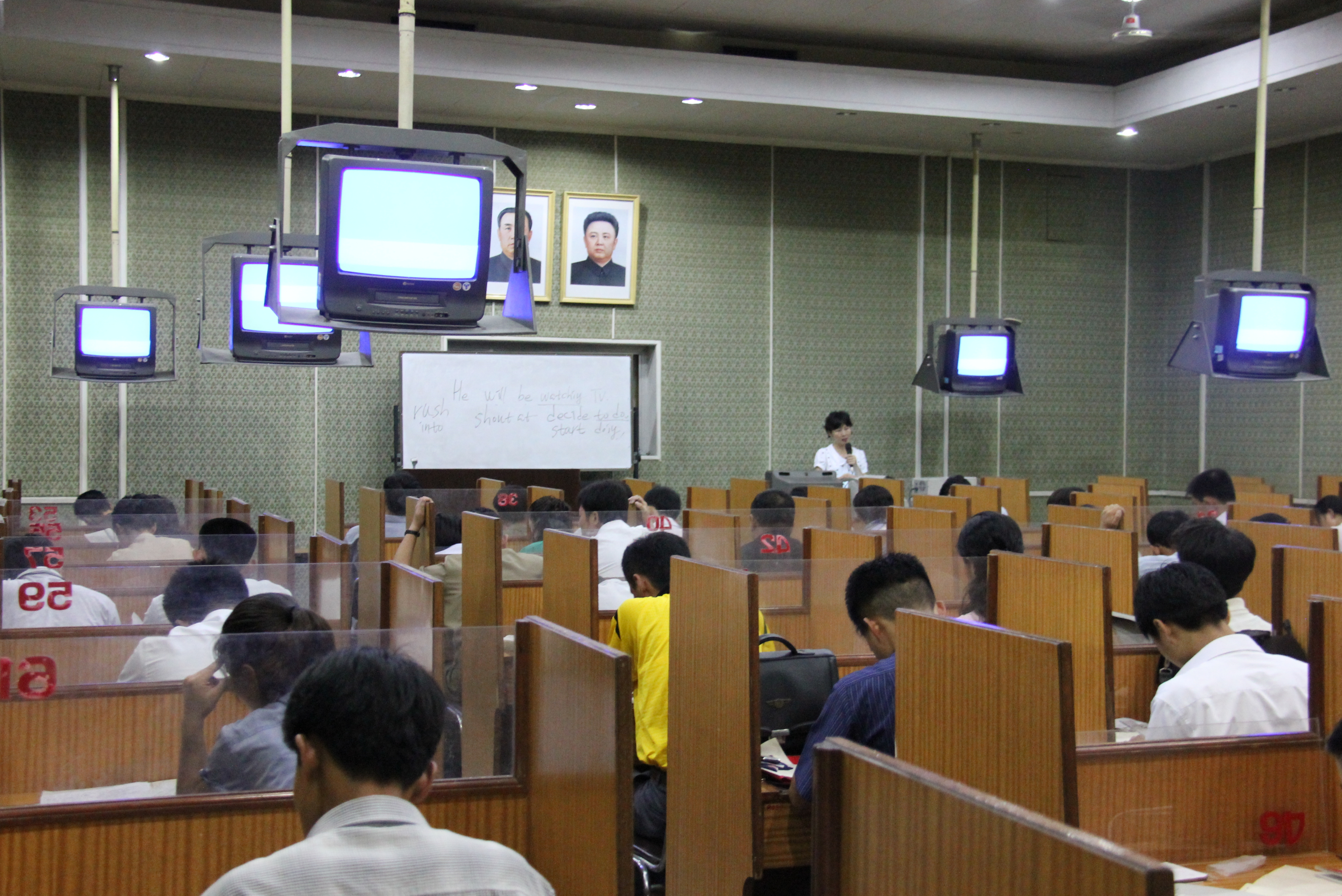
English lecture at the Grand People's Study House in Pyongyang

The 2008 census listed the entire population as literate. An 11-year free, compulsory cycle of primary and secondary education is provided in more than 27,000 nursery schools, 14,000 kindergartens, 4,800 four-year primary and 4,700 six-year secondary schools. 77% of males and 79% of females aged 30–34 have finished secondary school. An additional 300 universities and colleges offer higher education.

Most graduates from the compulsory program do not attend university but begin their obligatory military service or proceed to work in farms or factories instead. The main deficiencies of higher education are the heavy presence of ideological subjects, which comprise 50% of courses in social studies and 20% in sciences, and the imbalances in curriculum. The study of natural sciences is greatly emphasized while social sciences are neglected. Heuristics is actively applied to develop the independence and creativity of students throughout the system. The study of Russian and English was made compulsory in upper middle schools in 1978.

=== Health ===
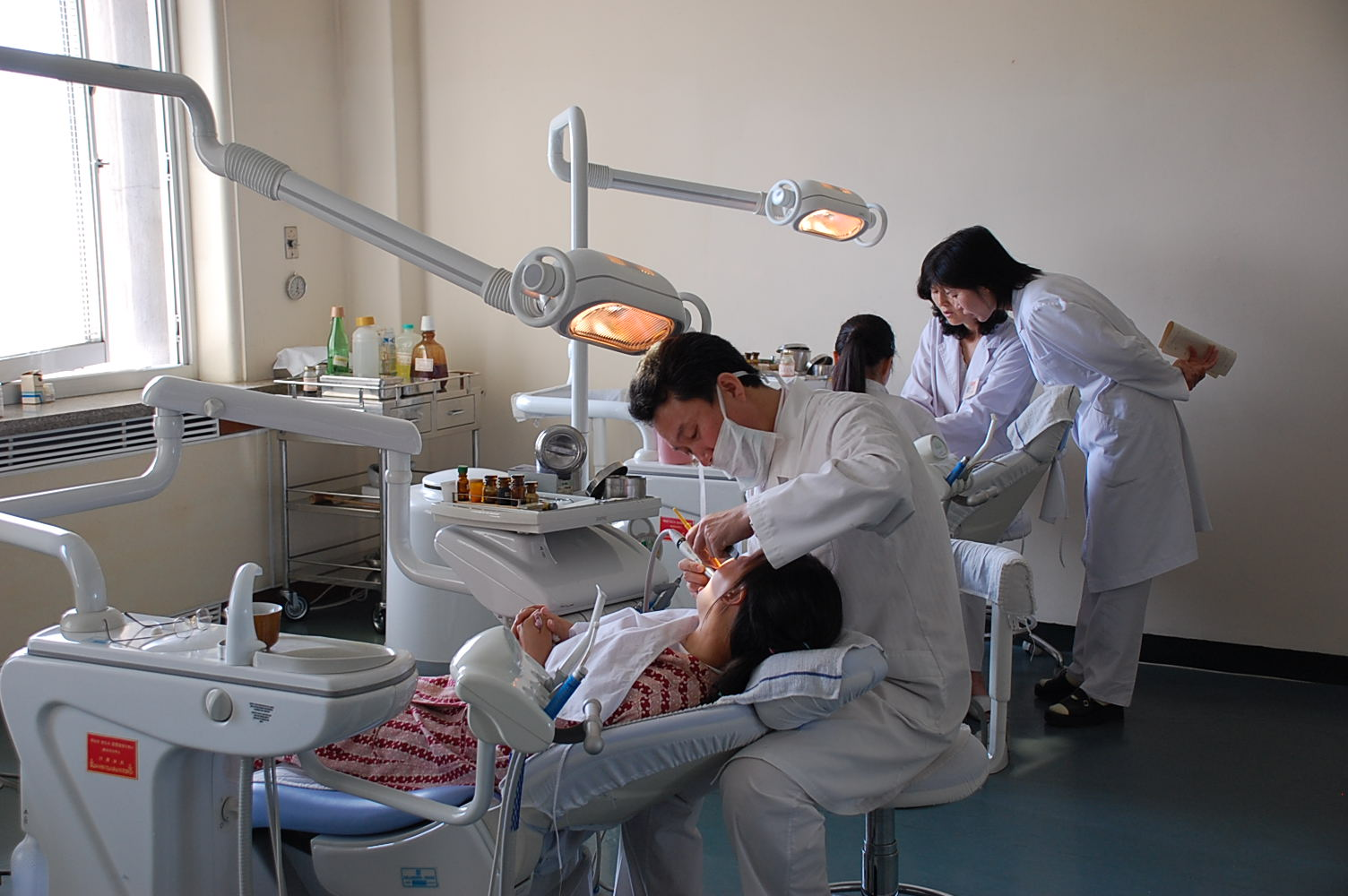
A dental clinic at Pyongyang Maternity Hospital

North Korea has a life expectancy of 72.3 years in 2019, according to HDR 2020. While North Korea is classified as a low-income country, the structure of North Korea's causes of death (2013) is unlike that of other low-income countries. Instead, it is closer to worldwide averages, with non-communicable diseases—such as cardiovascular disease and cancers—accounting for 84 percent of the total deaths in 2016. According to the World Bank report of 2016 (based on WHO's estimate), only 9.5% of the total deaths recorded in North Korea are attributed to communicable diseases and maternal, prenatal and nutrition conditions, a figure which is slightly lower than that of South Korea (10.1%) and one fifth of other low-income countries (50.1%) but higher than that of high income countries (6.7%). Only one out of ten leading causes of overall deaths in North Korea is attributed to communicable diseases (lower respiratory infection), a disease which is reported to have declined by six percent since 2007.

In 2013, cardiovascular disease as a single disease group was reported as the largest cause of death in North Korea. The three major causes of death in North Korea are stroke, COPD and ischaemic heart disease. Non-communicable diseases risk factors in North Korea include high rates of urbanization, an aging society, and high rates of smoking and alcohol consumption amongst men. Maternal mortality is lower than other low-income countries, but significantly higher than South Korea and other high income countries, at 89 per 100,000 live births. In 2008 child mortality was estimated to be 45 per 1,000, which is much better than other economically comparable countries. Chad for example had a child mortality rate of 120 per 1,000, despite the fact that Chad was most likely wealthier than North Korea at the time. According to a 2003 report by the United States Department of State, almost 100% of the population has access to water and sanitation. Further, 80% of the population had access to improved sanitation facilities in 2015.

A free universal insurance system is in place. Quality of medical care varies significantly by region and is often low, with severe shortages of equipment, drugs and anesthetics. According to WHO, expenditure on health per capita is one of the lowest in the world. Preventive medicine is emphasized through physical exercise and sports, nationwide monthly checkups and routine spraying of public places against disease. Every individual has a lifetime health card which contains a full medical record. Healthcare Access and Quality Index, as calculated by IHME, was reported to stand at 62.3, much lower than that of South Korea. North Korea has the highest number of doctors per capita amongst low-income countries, with 3.7 physicians per 1,000 people, a figure which is also significantly higher than that of South Korea, according to WHO's data. Conflicting reports between Amnesty and WHO have emerged, where the Amnesty report claimed that North Korea had an inadequate health care system, while the Director of the World Health Organization claimed that North Korea's healthcare system was considered the envy of the developing world and had "no lack of doctors and nurses".

=== Songbun ===
According to U.S. reports and refugee testimonies, all North Koreans are sorted into groups according to their Songbun, an ascribed status system based on a citizen's assessed loyalty to the government. Based on their own behavior and the political, social, and economic background of their family for three generations as well as behavior by relatives within that range, Songbun is allegedly used to determine whether an individual is trusted with responsibility or given certain opportunities. Songbun reportedly affects access to educational and employment opportunities and particularly whether a person is eligible to join North Korea's ruling party.

There are 3 main classifications and about 50 sub-classifications. According to Kim Il Sung, speaking in 1958, the loyal "core class" constituted 25% of the North Korean population, the "wavering class" 55%, and the "hostile class" 20%. The highest status is accorded to individuals descended from those who participated with Kim Il Sung in the resistance against Japanese occupation before and during World War II and to those who were factory workers, laborers, or peasants in 1950. While some analysts believe private commerce recently changed the Songbun system to some extent, most North Korean refugees say it remains a commanding presence in everyday life. The North Korean government claims all citizens are equal and denies any discrimination on the basis of family background.

== Culture ==
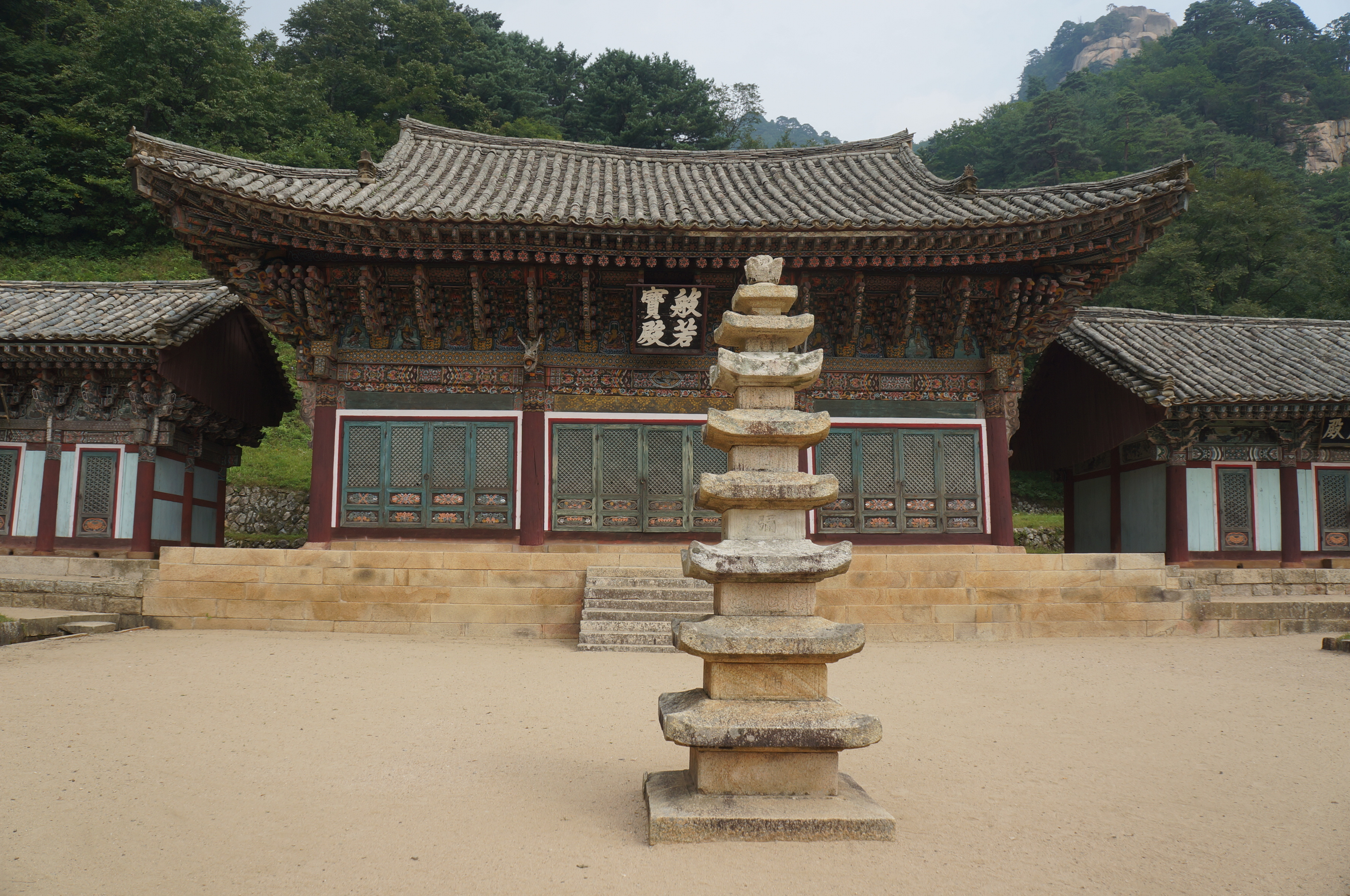
Pyohunsa Buddhist Temple, a National Treasure of North Korea

Despite a historically strong Chinese influence, Korean culture has shaped its own unique identity. It came under attack during the Japanese rule from 1910 to 1945, when Japan enforced a cultural assimilation policy. Koreans were forced to learn and speak Japanese, adopt the Japanese family name system and Shinto religion, and were forbidden to write or speak the Korean language in schools, businesses, or public places.

After the peninsula was divided in 1945, two distinct cultures formed out of the common Korean heritage. North Koreans have little exposure to foreign influence. The revolutionary struggle and the brilliance of the leadership are some of the main themes in art. "Reactionary" elements from traditional culture have been discarded and cultural forms with a "folk" spirit have been reintroduced.

Korean heritage is protected and maintained by the state. Over 190 historical sites and objects of national significance are cataloged as National Treasures of North Korea, while some 1,800 less valuable artifacts are included in a list of Cultural Assets. The Historic Monuments and Sites in Kaesong and the Complex of Koguryo Tombs are UNESCO World Heritage Sites. The Goguryeo tombs are registered on UNESCO's list of World Heritage Sites. These remains were registered as the first World Heritage property of North Korea in the UNESCO World Heritage Committee (WHC) in July 2004. There are 63 burial mounds on the site, with clear murals preserved. The burial customs of the Goguryeo culture have influenced Asian civilizations beyond Korea, including Japan.

=== Art ===
Visual arts are generally produced in the aesthetic of socialist realism. North Korean painting combines the influence of Soviet and Japanese visual expression to instill a sentimental loyalty to the system. All artists in North Korea are required to join the Artists' Union, and the best among them can receive an official license to portray the leaders. Portraits and sculptures depicting Kim Il Sung, Kim Jong Il and Kim Jong Un are classed as "Number One works".

Most aspects of art have been dominated by Mansudae Art Studio since its establishment in 1959. It employs around 1,000 artists in what is likely the biggest art factory in the world where paintings, murals, posters and monuments are designed and produced. The studio has commercialized its activity and sells its works to collectors in a variety of countries including China, where it is in high demand. Mansudae Overseas Projects is a subdivision of Mansudae Art Studio that carries out construction of large-scale monuments for international customers.

=== Literature ===
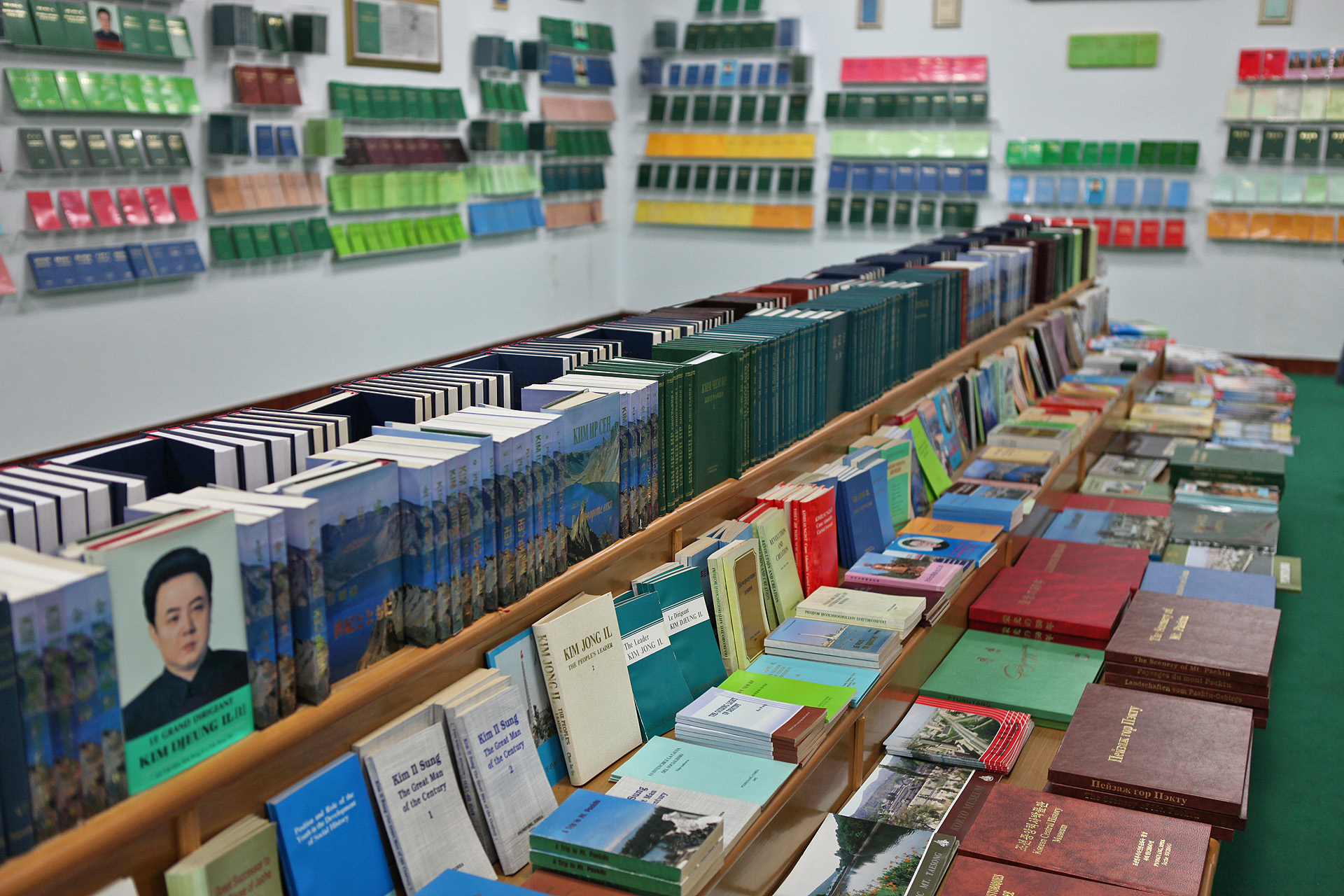
A North Korean bookstore with works of Kim Il Sung and Kim Jong Il

All publishing houses are owned by the government or the WPK because they are considered an important tool for agitprop. The Workers' Party of Korea Publishing House is the most authoritative among them and publishes all works of Kim Il Sung, ideological education materials and party policy documents. The availability of foreign literature is limited, examples being North Korean editions of Indian, German, Chinese and Russian fairy tales, Tales from Shakespeare and some works of Bertolt Brecht and Erich Kästner.

Kim Il Sung's personal works are considered "classical masterpieces" while the ones created under his instruction are labeled "models of Juche literature". These include The Fate of a Self-Defense Corps Man, The Song of Korea and Immortal History, a series of historical novels depicting the suffering of Koreans under Japanese occupation. More than four million literary works were published between the 1980s and the early 2000s, but almost all of them belong to a narrow variety of political genres like "army-first revolutionary literature".

Science fiction is considered a secondary genre because it somewhat departs from the traditional standards of detailed descriptions and metaphors of the leader. The exotic settings of the stories give authors more freedom to depict cyberwarfare, violence, sexual abuse, and crime, which are absent in other genres. Sci-fi works glorify technology and promote the Juche concept of anthropocentric existence through depictions of robotics, space exploration, and immortality.

=== Music ===
"Song of Comradeship"
performed by the KPA State Chorus

"Let us Dash towards the Future"
performed by Moranbong Band

The government emphasized optimistic folk-based tunes and revolutionary music throughout most of the 20th century. Ideological messages are conveyed through massive orchestral pieces like the "Five Great Revolutionary Operas" based on traditional Korean ch'angguk. Revolutionary operas differ from their Western counterparts by adding traditional instruments to the orchestra and avoiding recitative segments. Sea of Blood is the most widely performed of the Five Great Operas: since its premiere in 1971, it has been played over 1,500 times, and its 2010 tour in China was a major success. Western classical music by Brahms, Tchaikovsky, Stravinsky and other composers is performed both by the State Symphony Orchestra and student orchestras.

Pop music appeared in the 1980s with the Pochonbo Electronic Ensemble and Wangjaesan Light Music Band. Improved relations with South Korea following the 2000 inter-Korean summit caused a decline in direct ideological messages in pop songs, but themes like comradeship, nostalgia and the construction of a powerful country remained. In 2014, the all-girl Moranbong Band was described as the most popular group in the country. North Koreans also listen to K-pop which spreads through illegal markets.

=== Media ===
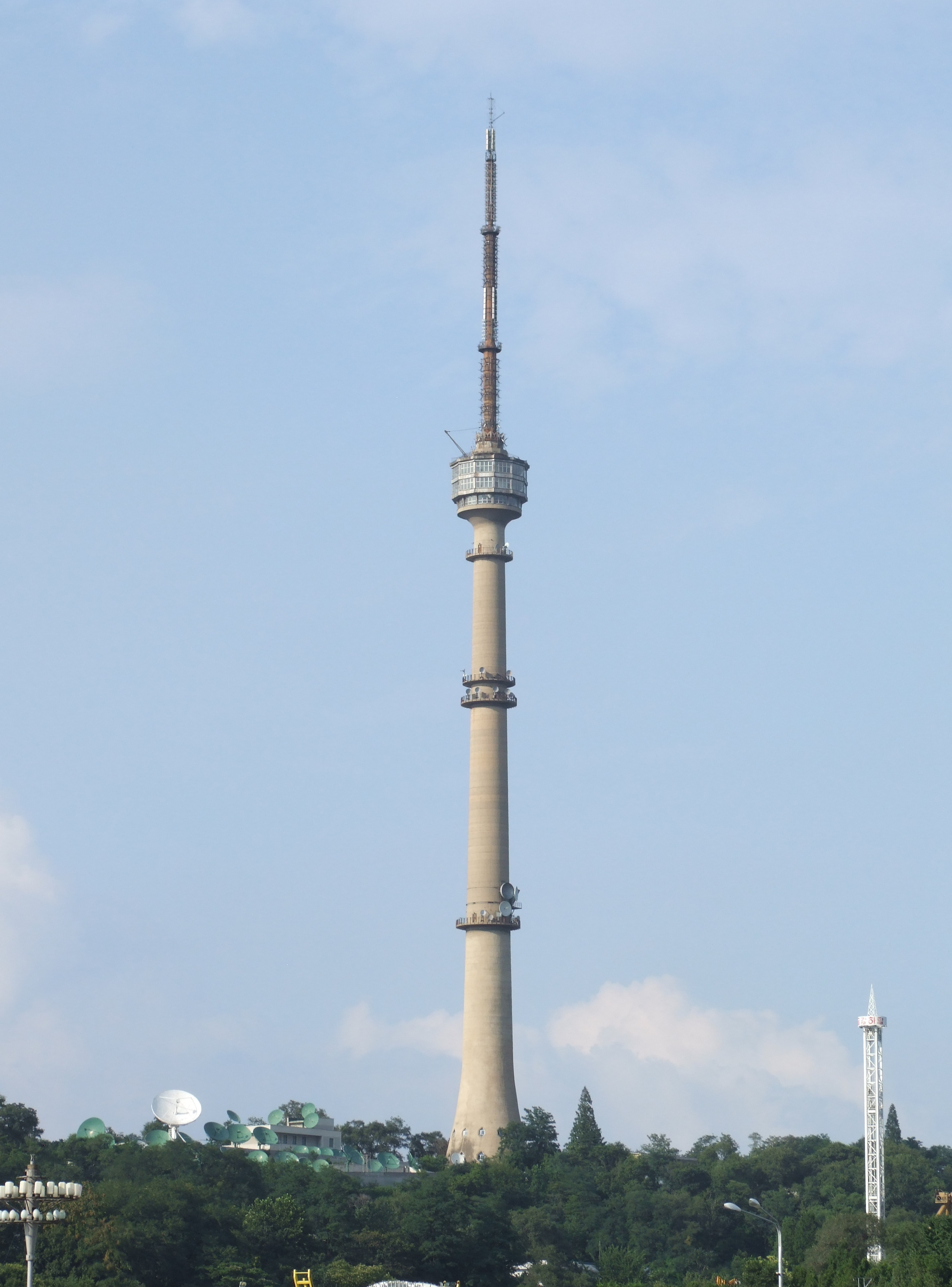
The Pyongyang TV Tower, designed after the Ostankino Tower in Moscow

North Korean media are under some of the strictest government control in the world. The censorship in North Korea encompasses all the information produced by the media. Monitored heavily by government officials, the media is strictly used to reinforce ideals approved by the government. There is no freedom of press in North Korea as all the media is controlled and filtered through governmental censors. In 2025, North Korea ranked 179th out of 180 countries in Reporters Without Borders' annual World Press Freedom Index. According to Freedom House, all media outlets serve as government mouthpieces, all journalists are party members and listening to foreign broadcasts carries the threat of the death penalty. Cultural products from enemy states such as South Korea are outlawed by the North Korean government, with a maximum penalty of death.

Government policies towards film are no different from those applied to other arts—motion pictures serve to fulfill the targets of "social education". Some of the most influential films are based on historic events (An Jung-geun shoots Itō Hirobumi) or folk tales (Hong Gildong). Most movies have predictable propaganda story lines which make cinema an unpopular entertainment; viewers only see films that feature their favorite actors. Most foreign productions are only available at private showings to high-ranking Party members. Access to foreign media products is available through smuggled DVDs and television or radio broadcasts in border areas. Some foreign films have been smuggled across the borders of North Korea, allowing for access to the North Korean citizens.

The main news provider is the Korean Central News Agency. All 12 major newspapers and 20 periodicals, including Rodong Sinmun, the official newspaper of the Party Central Committee, are published in the capital. There are three state-owned TV stations. Two of them broadcast only on weekends and Korean Central Television is on air every day in the evenings. The Associated Press opened the first Western all-format, full-time bureau in Pyongyang in 2012.

Media coverage of North Korea has often been inadequate as a result of the country's isolation. Stories like Kim Jong Un executing his ex-girlfriend or feeding his uncle to a pack of hungry dogs have been circulated by foreign media as truth despite the lack of a credible source. Many of the claims originate from the South Korean right-wing newspaper The Chosun Ilbo. Max Fisher of The Washington Post has written that "almost any story [on North Korea] is treated as broadly credible, no matter how outlandish or thinly sourced". Occasional deliberate disinformation on the part of North Korean establishments further complicates the issue.

=== Cuisine ===
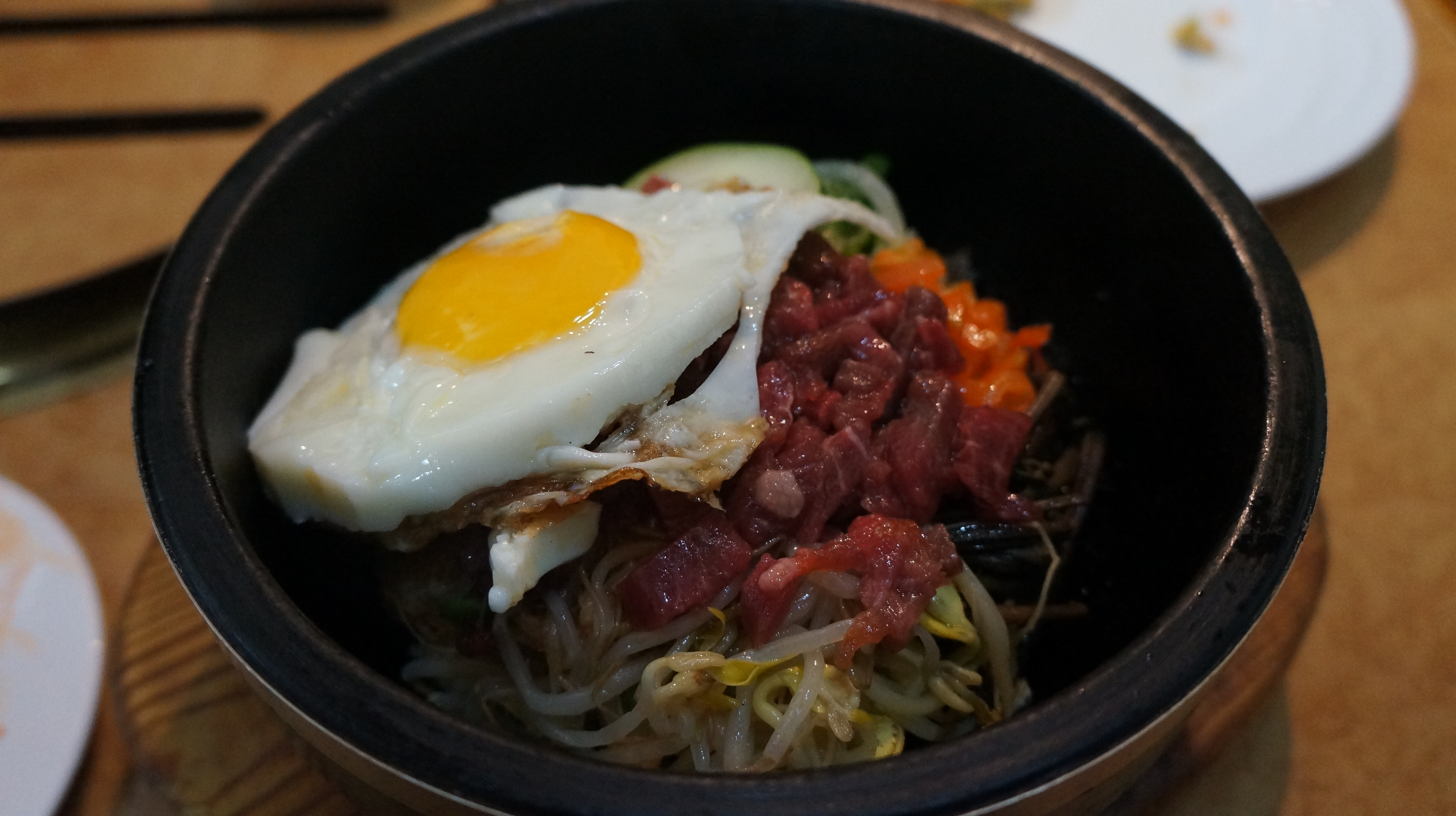
North Korean yukhoe pibimpap

Korean cuisine has evolved through centuries of social and political change. Originating from ancient agricultural and nomadic traditions in southern Manchuria and the Korean Peninsula, it has gone through a complex interaction of the natural environment and different cultural trends. Rice dishes and kimchi are staple Korean food. In a traditional meal, they accompany both side dishes (panch'an) and main courses like chuk, pulgogi or noodles. Soju liquor is the best-known traditional Korean spirit.

North Korea's most famous restaurant, Okryu-gwan, located in Pyongyang, is known for its raengmyŏn cold noodles. Other dishes served there include gray mullet soup with boiled rice, beef rib soup, green bean pancake, shinsŏllo and dishes made from terrapin. Okryu-gwan sends research teams into the countryside to collect data on Korean cuisine and introduce new recipes. Some Asian cities host branches of the Pyongyang restaurant chain where waitresses perform music and dance.

=== Sports ===
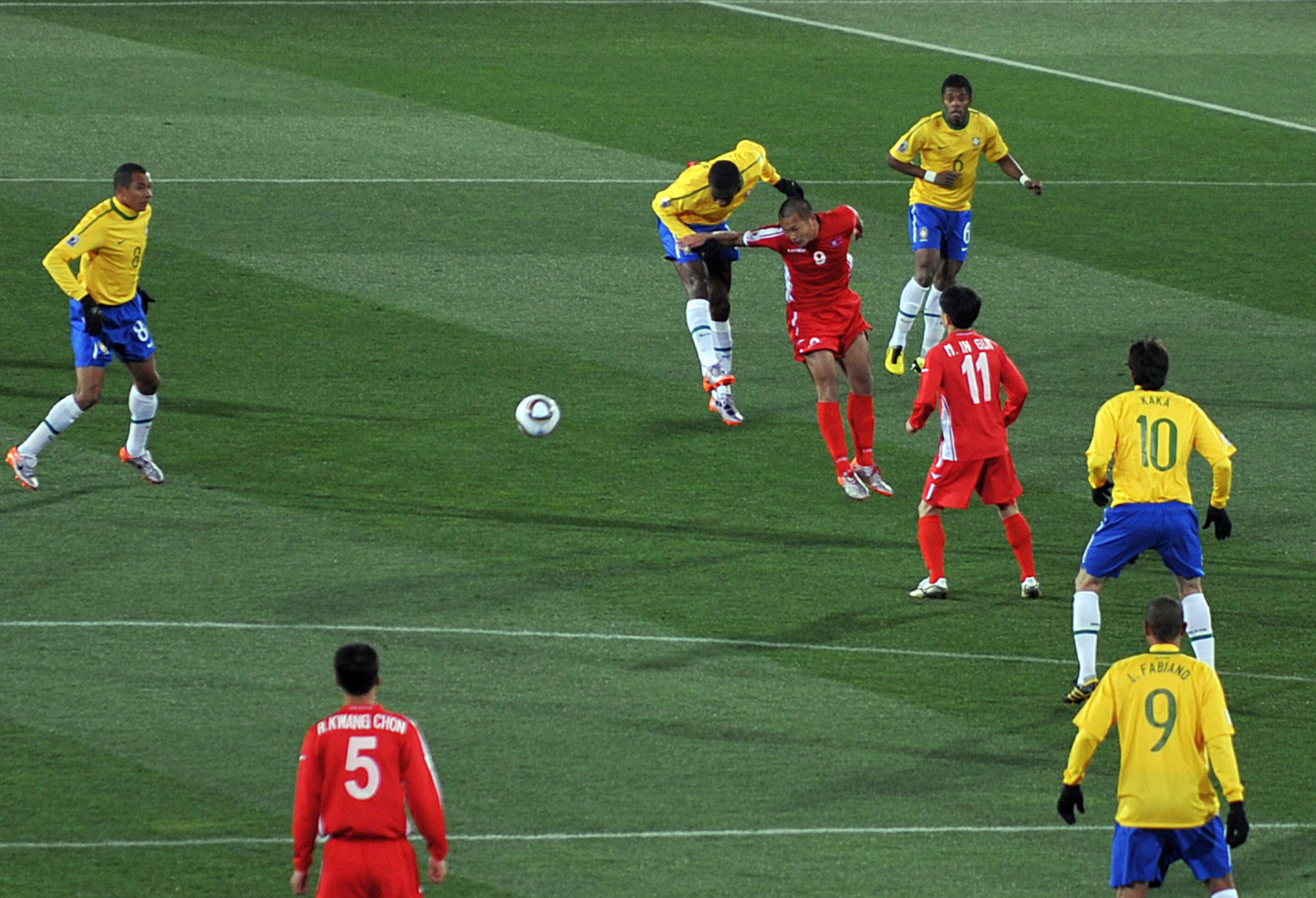
North Korea (in red) against Brazil at the 2010 FIFA World Cup

Most schools have daily practice in association football, basketball, table tennis, gymnastics, boxing and others. The DPR Korea League is popular inside the country and its games are often televised. The national football team, Chollima, competed in the FIFA World Cup in 2010, when it lost all three matches against Brazil, Portugal and Ivory Coast. Its 1966 appearance was much more successful, seeing a surprise 1–0 victory over Italy and a quarter final loss to Portugal by 3–5. A national team represents the nation in international basketball competitions as well. In December 2013, former American basketball professional Dennis Rodman visited North Korea to help train the national team after he developed a friendship with Kim Jong Un.

North Korea's first appearance in the Olympics came in 1964. The 1972 Olympics saw its summer games debut and five medals, including one gold. With the exception of the boycotted Los Angeles and Seoul Olympics, North Korean athletes have won medals in all summer games since then. Weightlifter Kim Un-guk broke the world record of the Men's 62 kg category at the 2012 Summer Olympics in London. Successful Olympians receive luxury apartments from the state in recognition for their achievements.

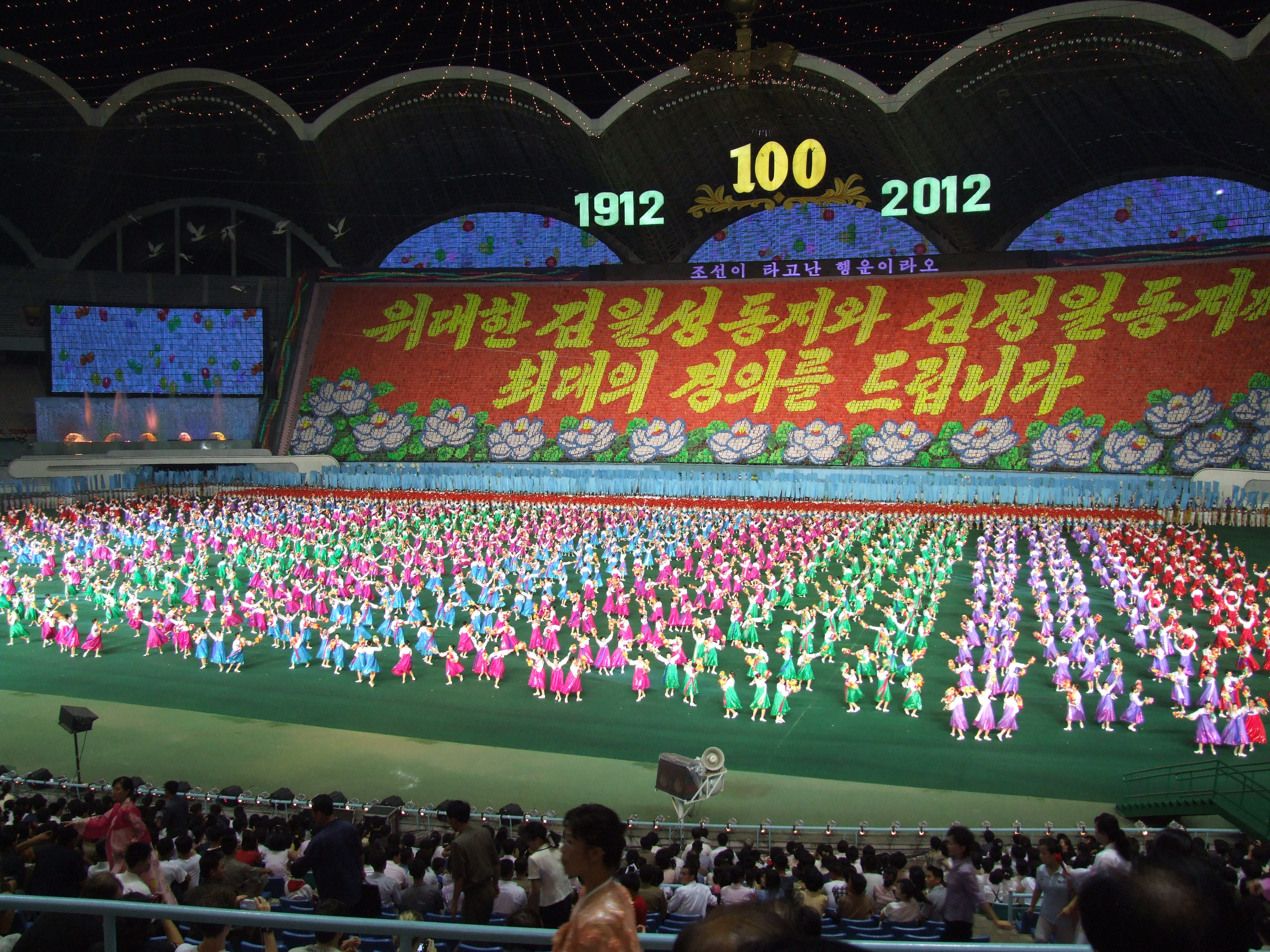
A scene from the 2012 Arirang Festival

The Arirang Mass Games has been recognized by the Guinness World Records as the biggest choreographic event in the world. Some 100,000 athletes perform rhythmic gymnastics and dances while another 40,000 participants create a vast animated screen in the background. The event is an artistic representation of the country's history and pays homage to Kim Il Sung and Kim Jong Il. Rungrado 1st of May Stadium, the second largest stadium in the world with its capacity of 114,000, hosts the Festival. The Pyongyang Marathon is another notable sports event. It is an IAAF Bronze Label Race where amateur runners from around the world can participate.

== See also ==
- Outline of North Korea
- Bibliography of North Korea
