= Miriam Sapiro =

American politician

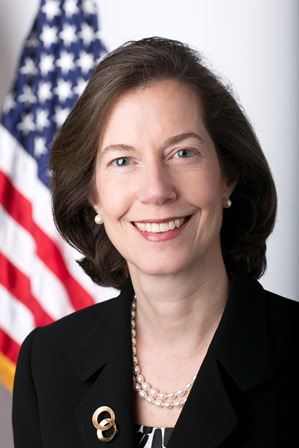

United States Trade Representative Acting
- In office May 23, 2013 – June 21, 2013
- President: Barack Obama
- Deputy: Michael Punke
- Preceded by: Demetrios Marantis (Acting)
- Succeeded by: Michael Froman

Deputy United States Trade Representative
- In office December 12, 2009 – February 26, 2014
- President: Barack Obama
- Preceded by: Michael Punke

Personal details
- Born: August 23, 1960 (age 66) New York City, New York, U.S.
- Party: Democratic
- Education: Williams College (BA); New York University (JD); St Antony's College, Oxford (MA)

Miriam Elizabeth Sapiro (born 1960) served as the Deputy Trade Representative under Ron Kirk and became the acting Trade Representative on May 23, 2013. A former senior fellow at the Brookings Institution, Sapiro served as well in the State Department and on the National Security Council under Presidents Reagan, H. W. Bush and Clinton.

Following her tenure in the Obama administration, Sapiro was appointed partner at Finsbury and later the Head of the DC Office and SVP of public affairs at Sard Verbinnen & Co. Currently, Sapiro is a member of the U.S. Department of State Advisory Committee on International Communications & Information Policy.

== Early life and career ==
Sapiro attended New York University School of Law. She was the founder and president of Summit Strategies International, a consulting firm involved in internet and telecommunications policies. Prior to that, she was an executive in the technology sector. Sapiro worked in the White House for then-President Bill Clinton as Special Assistant and Counselor to the President for Southeast European Stabilization and Reconstruction. She also served as Director of European Affairs at the National Security Council, and as a member of the Secretary of State's Policy Planning Staff and Office of Legal Advisers.

== Board memberships ==
Sapiro has taught international courses at New York University School of Law, Georgetown University Law Center, Columbia University, and Duke University. She is a member of the Council on Foreign Relations and the Washington International Trade Association. Sapiro is a Democrat and was a member of the National Finance Committee of the 2016 Hillary Clinton campaign of the United States presidency.

Since October 2017, Sapiro is a member of the supervisory board of German airline Lufthansa. In 2024, Sapiro joined the Board of Directors of the International Foundation for Electoral Systems.

Political offices
Preceded by Demetrios Marantis; Acting	United States Trade Representative; Acting; 2013	Succeeded by Michael Froman
