= North Korean studies =

Sub-area of Korean studies

- Hangul: 북한학
- Hanja: 北韓學
- Revised Romanization: Bukhanhak
- McCune–Reischauer: Pukhanhak

North Korean studies is a sub-area of Korean studies. The number of researchers is comparatively small. The only fully dedicated institution to the study area is the University of North Korean Studies, Seoul, but many universities run undergraduate courses and postgraduate research programs.

The field has been unable to achieve consensus on even some fundamental questions, such as whether North Korea should be characterized as a communist or fascist state and what is the level of involvement of the government in human right abuses.

North Korean studies suffers from a lack of primary sources from the country, although the situation varies by decade. Sources from the 1940s are mostly Soviet documents available from archives. Documents from the 1950s are harder to come by. Some were smuggled out of the country, but the bulk of scholarship is done on reports of Eastern Bloc embassies in North Korea. As of 2018, Soviet documents from the 1960s are in the process of being declassified, but sources from Eastern European countries are already available. The availability of documents from the 1950s and especially the 1960s is contrasted with the fact that most of that which happened in North Korea took place outside of diplomatic circles, and foreign diplomats were given less and less information as time passed. Sources from the 1970s and 1980s are especially scarce outside of a selection of official publications. Beginning with the 1990s, scholarship has relied on testimonies of North Korean defectors.

== Academic departments ==
- Korea University Sejong Campus
- Dongguk University, 50 students
- University of Central Lancashire MA North Korean Studies
- DPRK Strategic Research Center, KIMEP University

== Academic projects ==
- North Korea International Documentation Project, NKIDP
- Beyond Parallel – research project by Center for Strategic and International Studies

== Journals and webpages ==
- 38 North – analysis website formerly at Johns Hopkins University, now at The Stimson Center
  - North Korea Tech – technology analysis blog, affiliated with 38 North
- Hyundae Pukhan Yongu – Contemporary North Korean Studies (현대 북한 연구)
- NK News – a news website
- Daily NK – a news and opinion website
- Sino-NK – an independent periodical
- North Korea Review – previously published by the Jamestown Foundation
- North Korean Review – an English-language academic journal fully devoted to North Korean studies by Yonsei University
- Citizens' Alliance for North Korean Human Rights – Quarterly journal (1996–2012)
- International Journal of Korean Unification Studies
- Routledge Research on Korea Series.

== Other DPRK-focused institutions conducting research ==
- Committee for Human Rights in North Korea
- Database Center for North Korean Human Rights
- Korea Institute for National Unification
- People for Successful Corean Reunification

== See also ==
- Media coverage of North Korea
- Satellite imagery in North Korea
- Category:Experts on North Korea
