= North Korea International Documentation Project =

American human rights organization

- Type: INGO
- Purpose: informational clearinghouse on North Korea
- Headquarters: Ronald Reagan Building and International Trade Center One Woodrow Wilson Plaza 1300 Pennsylvania Ave. NW Washington, DC 20004-3027
- Location: Washington, DC
- Official language: English
- Director: Christian F. Ostermann
- Parent organization: Woodrow Wilson International Center for Scholars
- Affiliations: University of North Korean Studies; Institute for Far Eastern Studies; The Syngman Rhee Institute, Yonsei University
- Website: www.wilsoncenter.org/about-14

The North Korea International Documentation Project (NKIDP) is part of the History and Public Policy Program at the Woodrow Wilson International Center for Scholars. It seeks to serve as an informational clearinghouse on North Korea for both the scholarly and policy making communities by widely disseminating newly declassified documents on the DPRK from its former communist allies as well as other resources that provide valuable insight into the actions and nature of the North Korean state.

== History and details ==
The North Korea International Documentation Project (NKIDP) has obtained and published documents on the history of North Korea from archives in the former Soviet Union, China, (East) Germany, Romania, Albania, Mongolia, Bulgaria, Poland, Hungary, the United States, and South Korea.

NKIDP believes that the efforts of contemporary scholars and policymakers are too often hampered by a distinct lack of knowledge about the North Korean leadership and political system. With no history of diplomatic relations with Pyongyang and severely limited access to the country’s elite, it is difficult for Western policymakers, journalists, and academics to understand the forces and intentions behind North Korea's enigmatic actions.

In cooperation with the University of North Korean Studies (Seoul) and an international network of researchers, the NKIDP provides access to both original and translated archival documents on the DPRK, publishes an NKIDP Working Paper series, regularly contributes to the Cold War International History Project (CWIHP) Bulletin series, and holds frequent conferences and workshops at the Wilson Center as well as throughout East Asia.

The NKIDP is supported by the Korea Foundation and other donors.
