= Michael Froman =

American lawyer (born 1962)

Mike Froman
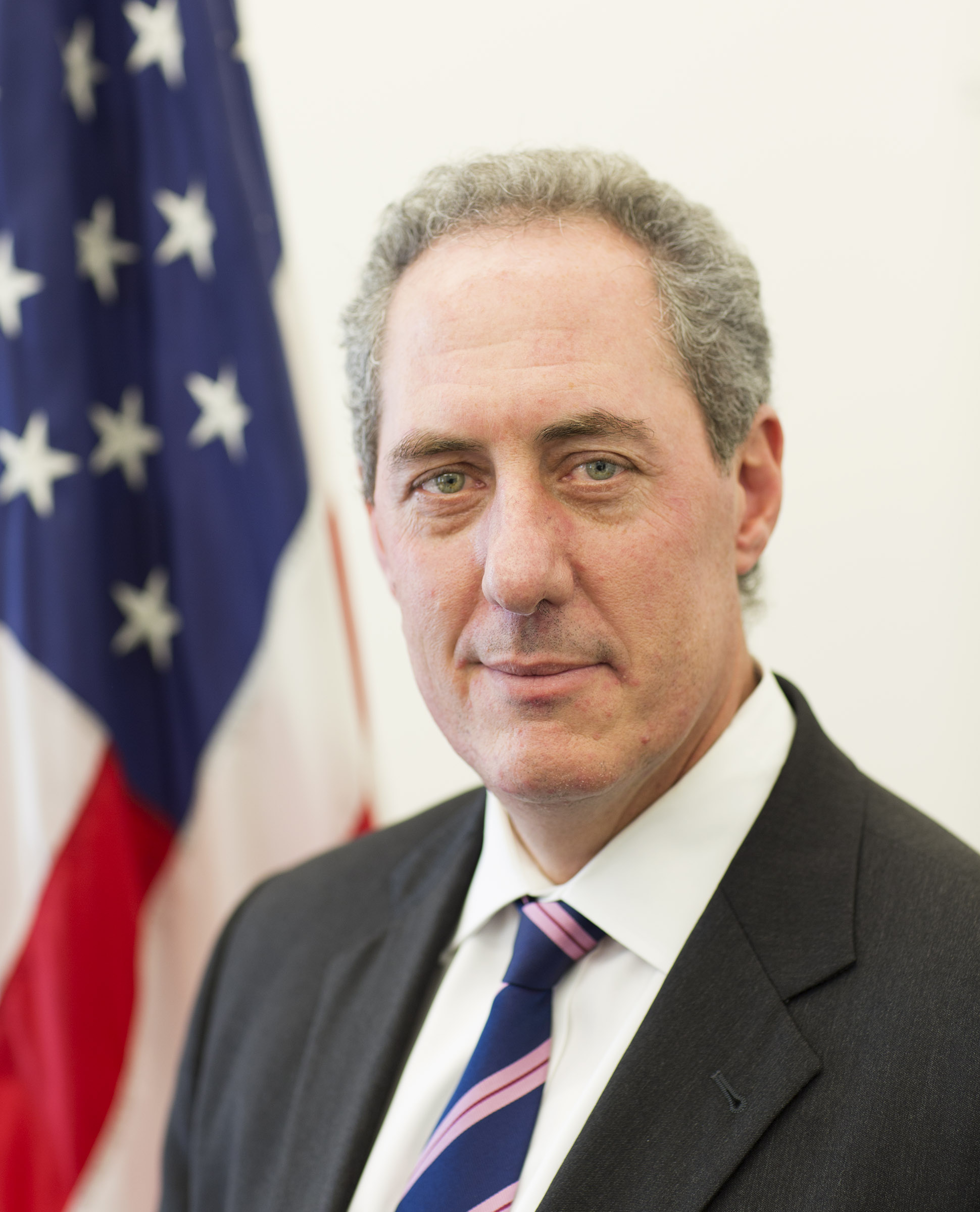
- Official portrait, 2013

President of the Council on Foreign Relations
- Incumbent
- Assumed office June 30, 2023
- Preceded by: Richard N. Haass

17th United States Trade Representative
- In office June 21, 2013 – January 20, 2017
- President: Barack Obama
- Deputy: Miriam Sapiro; Robert Holleyman
- Preceded by: Ron Kirk
- Succeeded by: Robert Lighthizer

United States Deputy National Security Advisor for International Economic Affairs
- In office January 20, 1993 – December 31, 1995
- President: Bill Clinton
- Preceded by: Position established
- Succeeded by: Position abolished

Personal details
- Born: August 20, 1962 (age 64) San Rafael, California, U.S.
- Party: Democratic
- Spouse: Nancy Goodman
- Children: 3
- Education: Princeton University (BA); St Antony's College, Oxford (MA, DPhil); Harvard University (JD)

Michael Braverman Goodman Froman (born August 20, 1962) is an American lawyer who is the current president of the Council on Foreign Relations. Froman served as the U.S. Trade Representative from 2013 to 2017. He was Assistant to the President of the United States and Deputy National Security Advisor for International Economic Affairs, a position held jointly at the National Security Council and the National Economic Council. In that position he served as the United States sherpa to the G7, G8, and G20 summits of economic powers. On May 2, 2013, President Barack Obama nominated him to succeed Ambassador Ron Kirk as the U.S. trade representative. He was confirmed on June 19, 2013.

== Early life and education ==
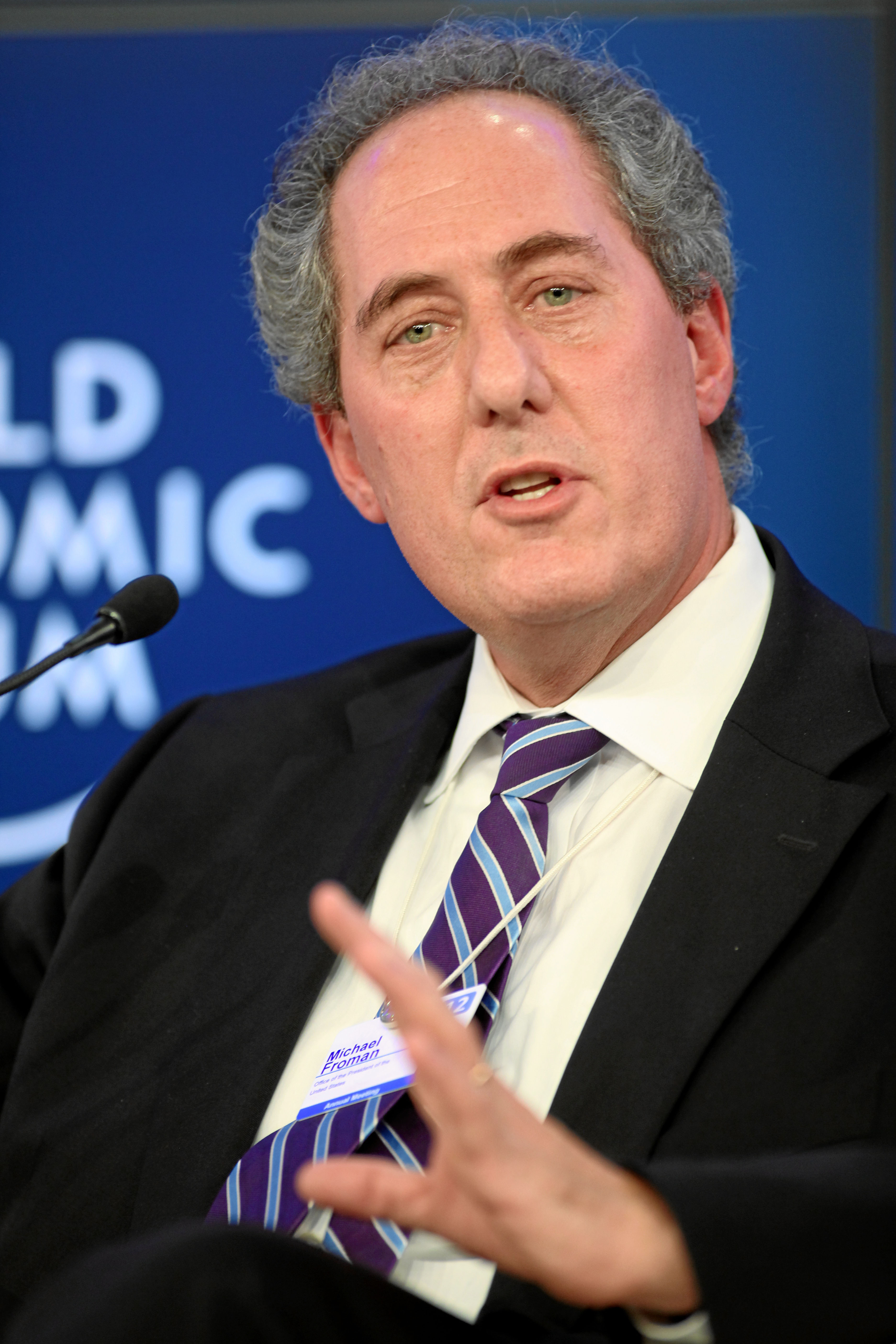
Froman during the WEF 2012

Born August 20, 1962, Froman grew up in a Jewish family in San Rafael and graduated from the Branson School. As a teenager, Froman was active in the B'nai B'rith Youth Organization, serving as the 56th International President in 1980. He later spoke at the BBYO International Convention in Washington, D.C., in February 2013. Froman received a B.A. in Public and International Affairs from the Woodrow Wilson School of Princeton University with a senior thesis entitled Negotiating from Strength: The Principle of Power in US-Soviet Arms Control in 1985, a D.Phil. in International Relations entitled The development of the idea of detente in American political discourse, 1952-1985, supervised by Sir Michael Howard, from St Antony's College, Oxford, in 1988 and a J.D. from Harvard Law School where he was a classmate of Barack Obama, and also where he was an associate of Obama on the Harvard Law Review.

== Career ==
Froman served as liaison of the American Bar Association's Central and East European Law Initiative (CEELI) legal assistance program in Albania. He was also a member of the Forward Studies Unit of the European Commission in Brussels.

Froman served as a White House Fellow in 1992-93 and worked in the White House Office of Economic & Domestic Policy.

Between January 1993 and December 1995, Froman was Deputy National Security Advisor for International Economic Affairs on the United States National Economic Council, a position held jointly at the National Security Council and the National Economic Council. He was Deputy Assistant Secretary for Eurasia and the Middle East, where his work was related to economic policy towards the former Soviet Union, Central and Eastern Europe, as well as economic components of the Dayton Accords. He was a Senior Fellow at the Council of Foreign Relations and a Resident Fellow at the German Marshall Fund.

Froman spent much of his career within the United States Department of the Treasury where he rose to Chief of Staff under Robert Rubin in January 1997 and served until July 1999.

After the end of the Clinton administration in 2001, Froman followed Robert Rubin from the Treasury Department to Citigroup. He was President and Chief Executive Officer of CitiInsurance and head of Emerging Markets Strategy at Citigroup, managing infrastructure and sustainable development investments. He received more than $7.4 million from January 2008 to 2009 alone.

Froman and Obama were not in touch after their time at Harvard until Obama's 2004 Senate campaign, when Froman volunteered to advise Obama on policy; he introduced Obama to Robert Rubin. In 2008, Froman served on a 12-member advisory board of the Obama campaign's transition team, and joined the White House for a second run in 2009. He went back to the position he held during the Clinton years, as deputy assistant to the president and deputy national security adviser for international economic affairs, at the National Security Council and the National Economic Council until 2013.

=== U.S. Trade Representative ===
On May 2, 2013, Froman was nominated to serve as U.S. Trade Representative. Financial documents provided to the Senate Finance Committee showed he had nearly $500,000 in an offshore fund at Ugland House on the Cayman Islands, which Obama had once described as "the biggest tax scam in the world". In 2013, congressional testimony Kevin Brady, criticized the EU low carbon fuel standard, where oil from tar-sands is classified by itself due to its higher carbon polluting impact compared to regular oil as a "discriminatory, environmentally unjustified" trade barrier, to which Froman responded, "I share your concerns", followed by a description of his work to "press the Commission to take the views of . . . U.S. refiners under consideration". Froman's role as in the drafting of classified trade deals (made public by WikiLeaks) was under scrutiny by lawyers and politicians alike. The U.S. Senate confirmed Froman in a 93-4 vote on June 19, 2013. One of the four dissenting senators was Massachusetts Democrat Elizabeth Warren, who faulted Froman for "refusing to commit to [...] standards of transparency in trade talks set by the George W. Bush administration". Environmental groups have criticized Froman for negotiating the Trans Pacific Partnership trade agreement in secret and that he "took care of his friends on Wall Street and in corporate board rooms at the expense of sound environmental and climate policy".

From 2013-2017, Froman served as the lead negotiator on the U.S. side for a bilateral investment treaty with China. The negotiations had been on-going since 2008. On taking office, the Trump administration stopped negotiations. According to Froman, the effort to reach an agreement was "more than 90 percent complete".

In 2017, Froman joined the Council on Foreign Relations as a distinguished fellow in the Washington, D.C., office.

In April 2018, he was hired by Mastercard Inc as Vice Chairman and President for Strategic Growth.

In September 2018, he became a director of The Walt Disney Company.

Since 2019, he has also been serving on the Transatlantic Task Force of the German Marshall Fund and the Bundeskanzler-Helmut-Schmidt-Stiftung (BKHS), co-chaired by Karen Donfried and Wolfgang Ischinger.

In March 2023, he was chosen as the new president of the Council on Foreign Relations, succeeding Richard N. Haass, who led the organization for two decades.

== Personal ==
Froman lives in Washington, D.C., with his wife, Nancy Goodman. They have one son, Benjamin, and one daughter, Sarah. His older son, Jacob, died in 2009 at age ten from a medulloblastoma, a rare form of pediatric brain cancer.

Political offices
| Preceded by Ron Kirk | United States Trade Representative; 2013–2017 | Succeeded by Robert Lighthizer |
