= 1999 Dallas mayoral election =

- May 2, 1999
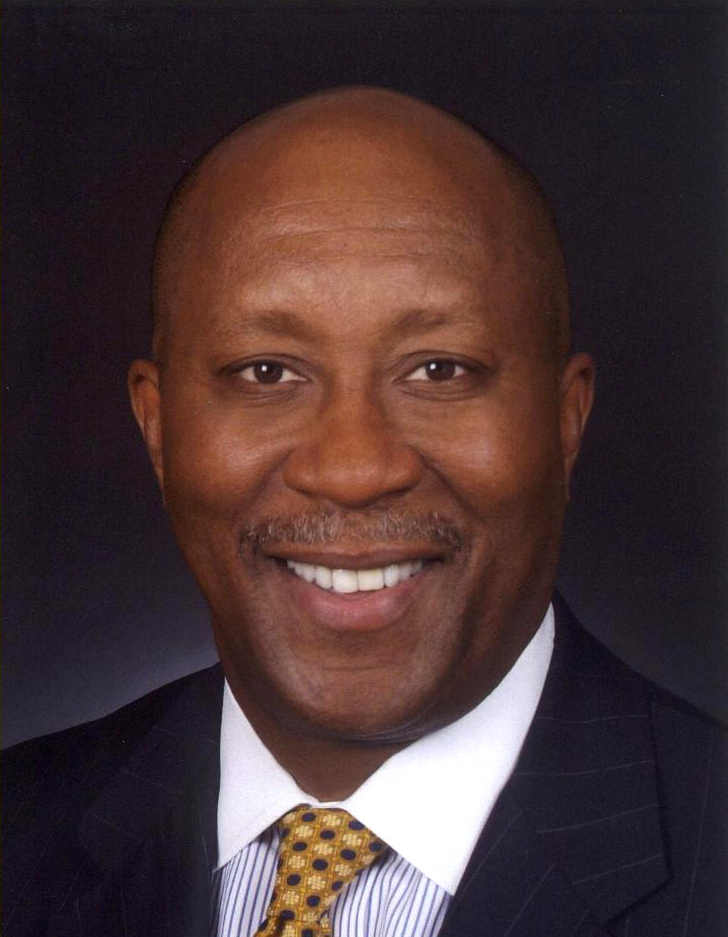

Candidate	Ron Kirk	Margaret A. Donnelly
Popular vote	28,123	8,186
Percentage	73.69%	21.45%
Mayor before election
Ron Kirk
Elected mayor
Ron Kirk

The 1999 Dallas mayoral election took place on May 2, 1999, to elect the mayor of Dallas, Texas. The race was officially nonpartisan. It saw the reelection of Ron Kirk, who won the election by taking a majority in the initial round of voting, thereby negating the need for a runoff to be held.

== Results ==
Results
Party	Candidate	Votes	%
Nonpartisan	Ron Kirk (incumbent)	28,123	73.69
Nonpartisan	Margaret A. Donnelly	8,186	21.45
Nonpartisan	Billy Jack Ludwig	1,855	4.86
