= Ronald Reagan Building and International Trade Center =

Federal building in Washington, D.C.

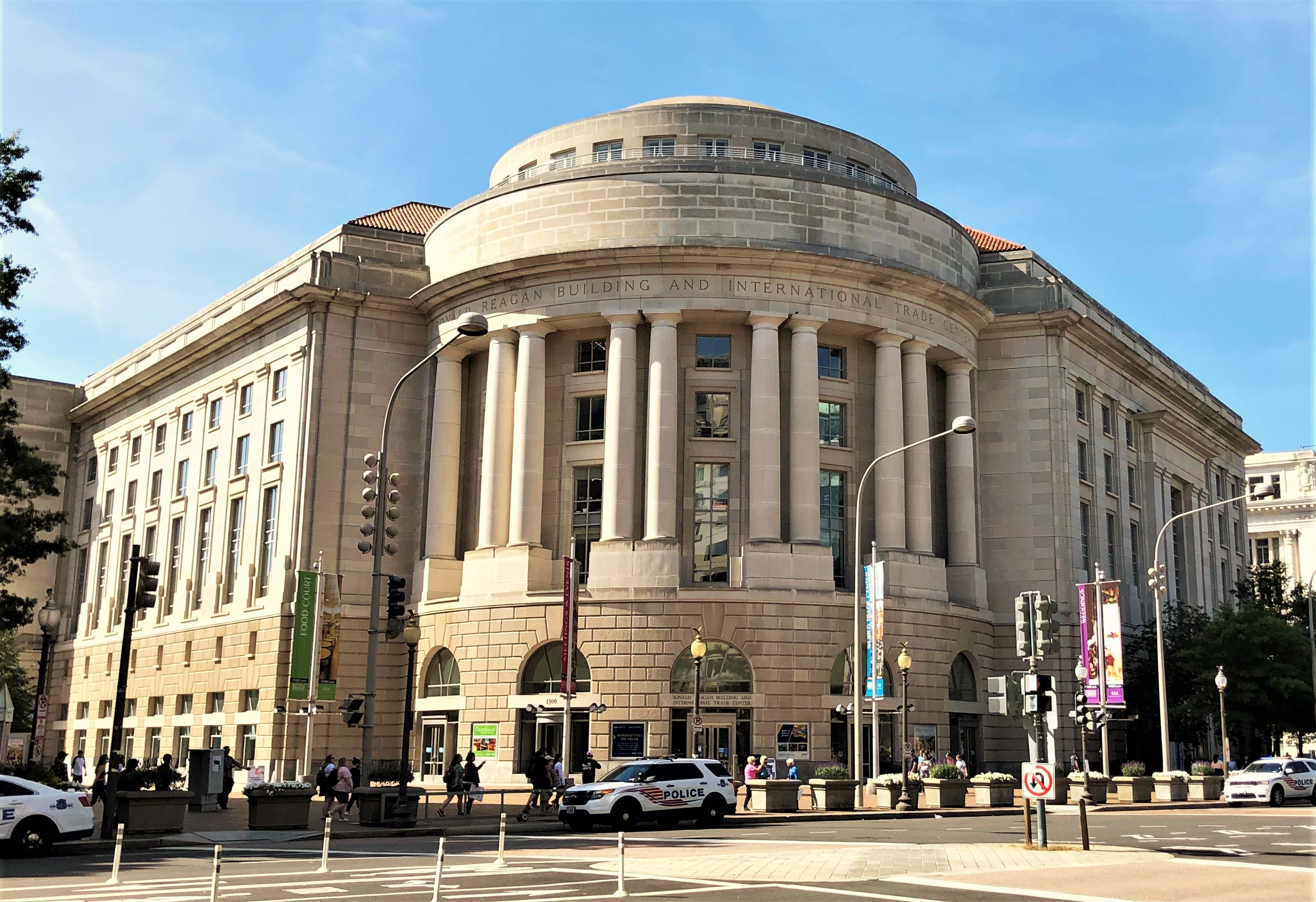
- Ronald Reagan Building and International Trade Center in 2021

- Location within Central Washington, D.C. Location within the District of Columbia Location within the United States

General information
- Location: 1300 Pennsylvania Avenue NW, Washington, D.C., United States
- Coordinates: 38°53′38″N 77°1′51″W
- Inaugurated: May 5, 1998
- Cost: $768 million
- Owner: General Services Administration

Technical details
- Size: 11 acres (4.5 ha)
- Floor area: 3,100,000 sq ft (290,000 m^{2})

Design and construction
- Architect: James Ingo Freed
- Architecture firm: Pei Cobb Freed & Partners; Ellerbe Becket

Website
- itcdc.com

The Ronald Reagan Building and International Trade Center, named after former United States president Ronald Reagan, is located in downtown Washington, D.C., and was the first federal building in Washington designed for both governmental and private sector purposes. It is the second largest federal building after the Pentagon. At the time it was built, the Ronald Reagan Building was the most expensive federal building ever constructed, at a cost of $768 million.

All the organizations located in the Pennsylvania Avenue building are dedicated to international trade and global relations. Organizations headquartered in this building include U.S. Customs and Border Protection (CBP), and the Woodrow Wilson International Center for Scholars. The U.S. Agency for International Development (USAID) was a tenant for many years until it was mostly dismantled in 2025. The first private sector lease was signed with investment banking firm Quarterdeck Investment Partners, Inc. The building hosts conferences, trade shows, cultural events, and outdoor concerts. Post-9/11, security requirements for high-profile federal buildings have limited the amount of public access anticipated by the center's designers.

== History ==
=== 20th century ===
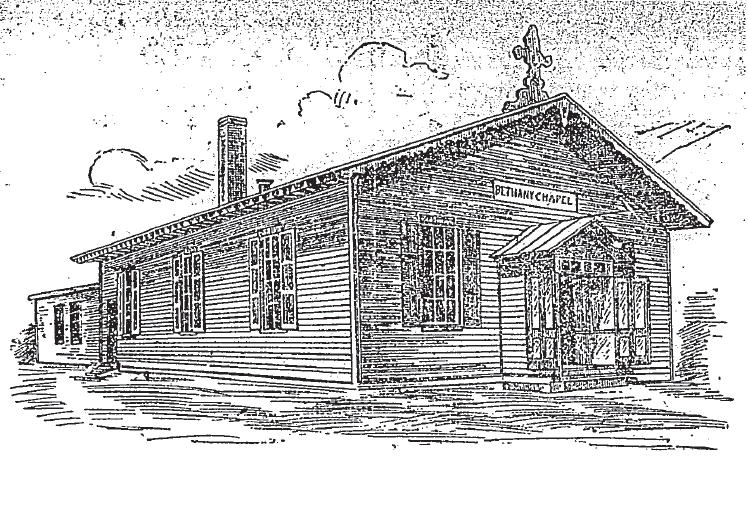
An illustration of Bethany Chapel, a mission of New York Avenue Presbyterian Church, that was built in 1874 and later razed as part of the Federal Triangle's construction

The building is located near Federal Triangle station in Washington, D.C., an area once heavily populated with saloons and brothels. The federal government purchased the land in the 1920s, and it was to be part of the Federal Triangle redevelopment of the late 1920s and 1930s. Until development on the current building began, the area known as the "Great Plaza" was used as a massive downtown parking lot.

In the 1960s and 1970s, efforts were under way to finish Federal Triangle by building a large office building on the site of the parking lot. The first effort came in 1972, when the Nixon administration proposed building a $126 million office building on the lot in time for the national bicentennial in 1976. But this proposal was never seriously contemplated or funded. One outcome of the Nixon proposal was "the Weese Plan". The Nixon administration commissioned the architecture planning firm of Harry Weese & Associates to come up with a master plan for the continued development of Federal Triangle. The Master Plan, which was later called the Weese Plan, proposed a massive new federal office building on the parking lots of the Triangle and a new series of pedestrian paths throughout the complex, titled "Federal Walk". Federal Walk would not only be a network of sidewalks designed to showcase the architecture of Federal Triangle; it also included destinations such as spots for tourists to wait for tours of the interiors of each building, outdoor art, places for rest and contemplation, and cafes and restaurants. Federal Walk was gradually implemented in piecemeal fashion over the next 15 years, although it still remained incomplete as of 1997. The General Services Administration (GSA) held a competition in 1982 to select a design for a 10-story office building to replace the parking lot, but planning bodies refused to approve the plan.

Plans for construction of an office building on the Federal Triangle parking lot site found support in 1986. The Federal City Council, a private civic organization which had been promoting the construction of a $200 million international trade center in the District of Columbia, advocated construction of its proposed building at Federal Triangle. Reagan administration officials favored the plan, and in October 1986 the proposal received the backing of the GSA. The idea received support from Democrats in Congress as well, especially from Senator Daniel Patrick Moynihan, a former Kennedy administration aide who had long championed completion of the Federal Triangle. There was some opposition to the idea from planning officials and others, who were dismayed at the loss of parking in the downtown area and who feared that the trade center's proposed 1,300 to 2,600 underground parking slots would not be built due to poor soil conditions. A bill was passed (almost unanimously) by Congress on August 7, 1987, to provide $362 million for the construction of an "International Cultural and Trade Center" on the parking lot at Federal Triangle.

The plan was to provide office space for both the U.S. Departments of Justice and State. The legislation also provided that although the U.S. government would finance the building, a private developer would construct it. The federal government would lease space from the private developer for 30 years, after which ownership of the building would revert to the government. The bill also required the building to be financially self-supporting within two years of its completion. The rental prices throughout the lease's term would remain stable. It was only the fifth time the government had signed a "lease-to-own" agreement. With 1.4 million square feet (130,000 m^{2}) of office space and 500,000 square feet (46,000 m^{2}) of space for trade center activities, the planned trade center would be larger than any other federally owned building except for The Pentagon.

The bill also required that the trade center be "designed in harmony with historical and government buildings in the vicinity, ... reflect the symbolic importance and historic character of Pennsylvania Avenue and the Nation's Capital, and ... represent the dignity and stability of the Federal Government." A nine-member panel was established to approve any plans, and included the Secretaries of State, Agriculture, and Commerce; the Mayor of the District of Columbia; and five members of the public. The building was expected to be completed in 1992. President Reagan signed the Federal Triangle Development Act into law on August 22, 1987.

Preliminary design specifications required that the final building be no taller than the existing Federal Triangle structures, be constructed of similar materials, emphasize pedestrian traffic, and have a "sympathetic" architectural style. An architectural model by the firms of Notter Finegold & Alexander, Mariani & Associates, and Bryant & Bryant depicted a building with a long, uninterrupted facade along 14th Street NW and two colonnaded hemicycles on the east side (matching the Post Office Department building's hemicycle). The preliminary design specs were criticized for not more clearly specifying the architectural style, for bringing another 10,000 new workers to Federal Triangle each day, and for reducing the required number of parking spaces by 30 percent to just 1,300. The five public members of the design committee were named on April 6, 1988, and were former Senator Charles H. Percy, chair; Harry McPherson, president of the Federal City Council; Donald A. Brown, chair of the Federal City Council's International Center Task Force; Michael R. Garder, a member of the Pennsylvania Avenue Development Corporation; and Judah C. Sommer, a local attorney.

Groundbreaking on the now-$350 million building was scheduled for 1989, and completion in 1993. Disagreements broke out in mid-1988 over which federal agencies should take up residence in the structure, and whether they should be trade- or foreign-policy related. Seven designs were submitted in June 1989, each incorporating a base-middle-crown structure and enclosed in traditional materials, including a limestone facade, vertical glass windows, and terra-cotta roof tiles. Each design incorporated a new home for the Woodrow Wilson International Center for Scholars (a Smithsonian Institution entity), an outdoor memorial to President Woodrow Wilson, and exhibition and retail space.

Construction began in mid-1989. Contractors estimated the cost of the building at between $550 million and $800 million, far higher than the anticipated $350 million original price tag. The design committee picked the $738.3 million design submitted by Pei Cobb Freed & Partners in October 1989. A consortium, the Delta Partnership, led by New York City developer William Zeckendorf Jr. and Larry Silverstein, was chosen to build and operate the building and lease it to the government. One of the firms that previously lost the contract for the building's construction subsequently challenged the bidding process.

Significant cost increases led to the project being mothballed by the George H. W. Bush administration. The GSA refused to sign the draft lease, arguing that the building's rental costs were too high and would cost, rather than save, the federal government between $18 million and $24 million a year. Although Pei Cobb Freed agreed to investigate design changes to make the project less costly, at least one member of Congress declared the project dead. In September 1990, the architectural team made changes, which cut $82 million from the cost of the building, including eliminating two theaters, scaling down the reception hall, using plaster rather than stone, substituting aluminum for bronze in the trim, and reducing the size of interior doors, which reduced the building cost to $656 million.

In January 1991, another design change came when the number of parking spaces at the building was increased by 12.6 percent to 2,500 spaces. But the changes did not resolve the controversies enveloping the project. Design committee member Donald A. Brown quit the committee in late 1991, complaining that the Bush administration was meddling in the project's design. Two days later, Eleanor Holmes Norton, delegate to Congress, repeated these charges. On January 19, 1992, even as the foundation for the trade center was being dug, the GSA said the building would not achieve financial self-sufficiency. A separate report commissioned by the Bush administration reached similar conclusions. On January 25, 1992, the Bush administration cancelled the international trade center construction project. Days later, a United States district court ruled that Delta Partnership had been chosen in violation of federal contracting guidelines, although the court also refused to overturn the award after finding no bias in the award process. Construction experts decried the decision, saying that the building's costs could balloon to more than $1.2 billion if construction were resumed at a later time.

The decision to cancel the building was reversed on December 2, 1993, by the Clinton administration. Although the building was originally designed to be a major tourist destination and provide a boost to economic development in the downtown area, the building was repurposed to be a simple office building. Rather than a mix of federal and private renters, federal agencies were now scheduled to occupy 80 percent of the office space. By January 1995, the structure was two years behind schedule.

By September 1995, a tentative occupancy date of December 1996 had been set. The building was named for former President Ronald Reagan in October 1995. Its naming was controversial, because Ronald Reagan was considered by some to be a champion of small government and this building was seen by some as an example of a government waste. There were still occasional design glitches. The GSA approved two major sculptures for the Woodrow Wilson Plaza in 1994, but were abruptly ordered to halt work on them in June 1996 before being ordered to proceed again on them the following month, in July 1996. Construction slipped further, and by January 1997 occupancy was scheduled for the following summer. Construction continued to fall behind schedule, with completion not expected until summer 1998. Federal officials nonetheless planned to move more than 480 Environmental Protection Agency (EPA) employees into the building in July 1997. By this time, security concerns had led to several additional design changes, including a reduction in the number of parking spaces to just 1,900, and the cost of the building's construction had risen to $738 million.

==== Opening ====
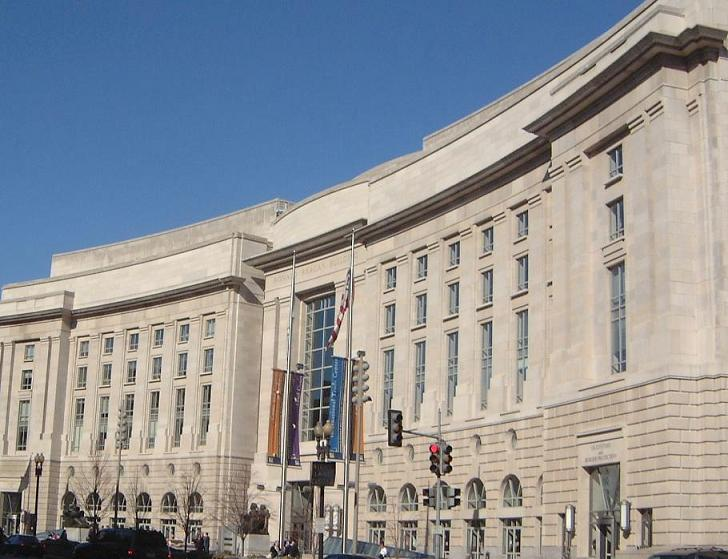
The 14th Street NW facade of the Ronald Reagan Building in 2006

The Ronald Reagan Building opened on May 5, 1998. President Bill Clinton and former First Lady Nancy Reagan dedicated the building. Three large pieces of artwork were included in the building. The first, by sculptor and Washington, D.C. native Stephen Robin, is a gigantic rose with stem and a lily, both made out of cast aluminum and lying on stone pedestals. The second, by Washington, D.C. native Martin Puryear, is a Minimalist tower of brown welded metal titled "Bearing Witness", which stands in Woodrow Wilson Plaza. The third, located inside the building's atrium, is a multi-story neon installation by Keith Sonnier titled "Route Zenith". The structure's final cost was $818 million.

=== 21st century ===
In early 2015, the GSA announced that the interior spaces of the Reagan Building had "reached the anticipated end of life cycle in nearly all areas of finishes, carpets, furniture, fixtures and equipment", and it began seeking contractors to extensively renovate the structure. In addition to CBP and the Wilson Center, other federal agencies with offices in the building in 2015 included the Department of Commerce, EPA and GSA. Other tenants included the National Children's Museum, several retail shops and various commercial and nonprofit organizations. On July 1, 2025 Kash Patel announced a planned move of the Federal Bureau of Investigation into the space formerly occupied by the United States Agency for International Development. In August 2026, a judge ruled the move would be a violation of the 2026 Appropriations Act passed by Congress.

== Events ==
The conference center hosts over 1,200 events each year, including many of Washington's annual social galas such as the Washington International Trade Association's Annual Dinner, and formerly including the Conservative Political Action Conference. The International Trade Center offers two large ballrooms, exhibition space, pre-function space, and other reception spaces. The outdoor, 4-acre Woodrow Wilson Plaza (1.6 ha) is also used in special events and galas.

With the city's largest parking garage, information center, and a Washington Metro station, the building is visited by over one million tourists each year. The summer concert series held on the Woodrow Wilson Plaza and the many food options draw many to the building during the lunch hour. The National Children's Museum opened in the building on February 24, 2020.

== Gallery ==
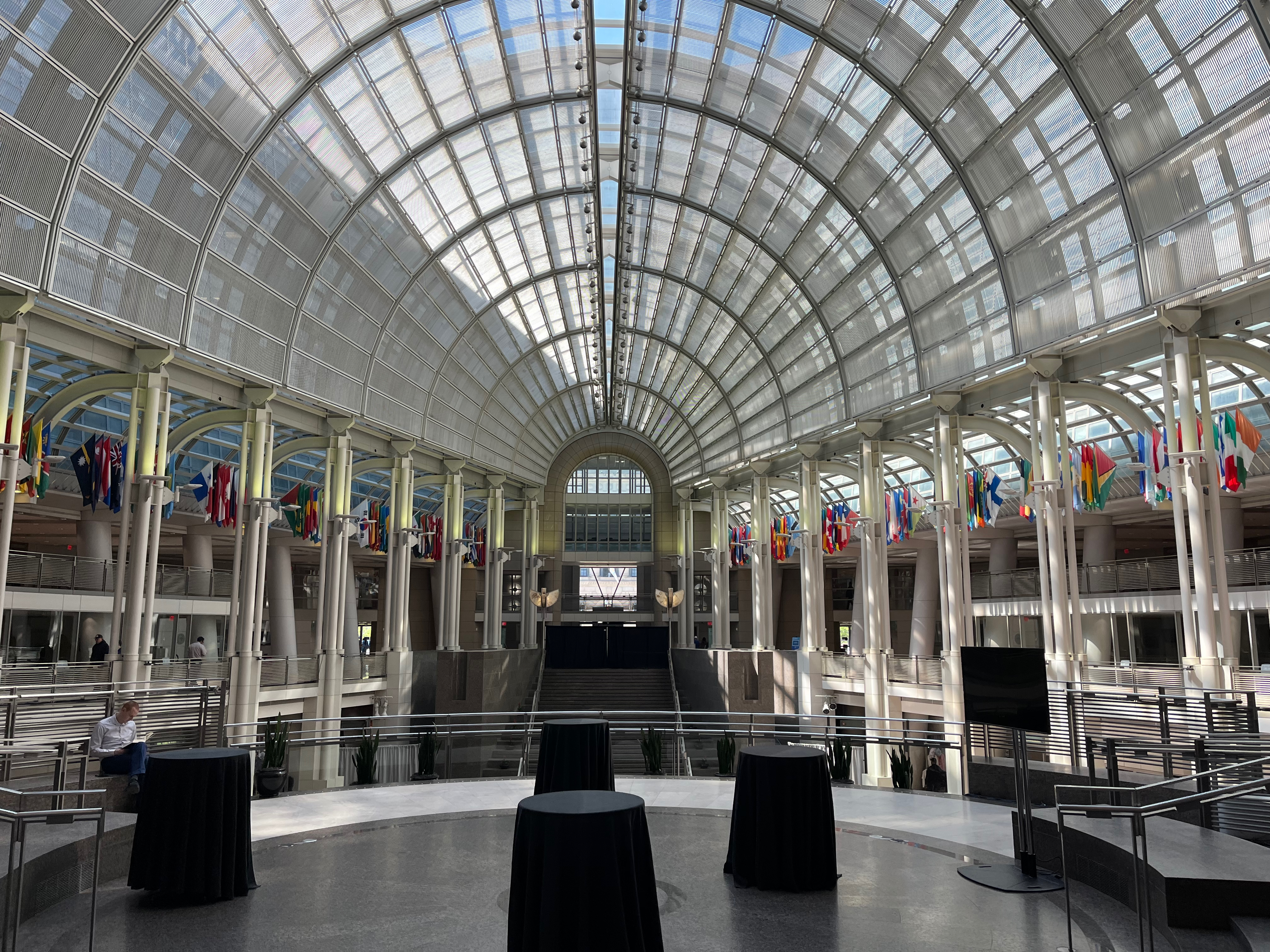
Atrium

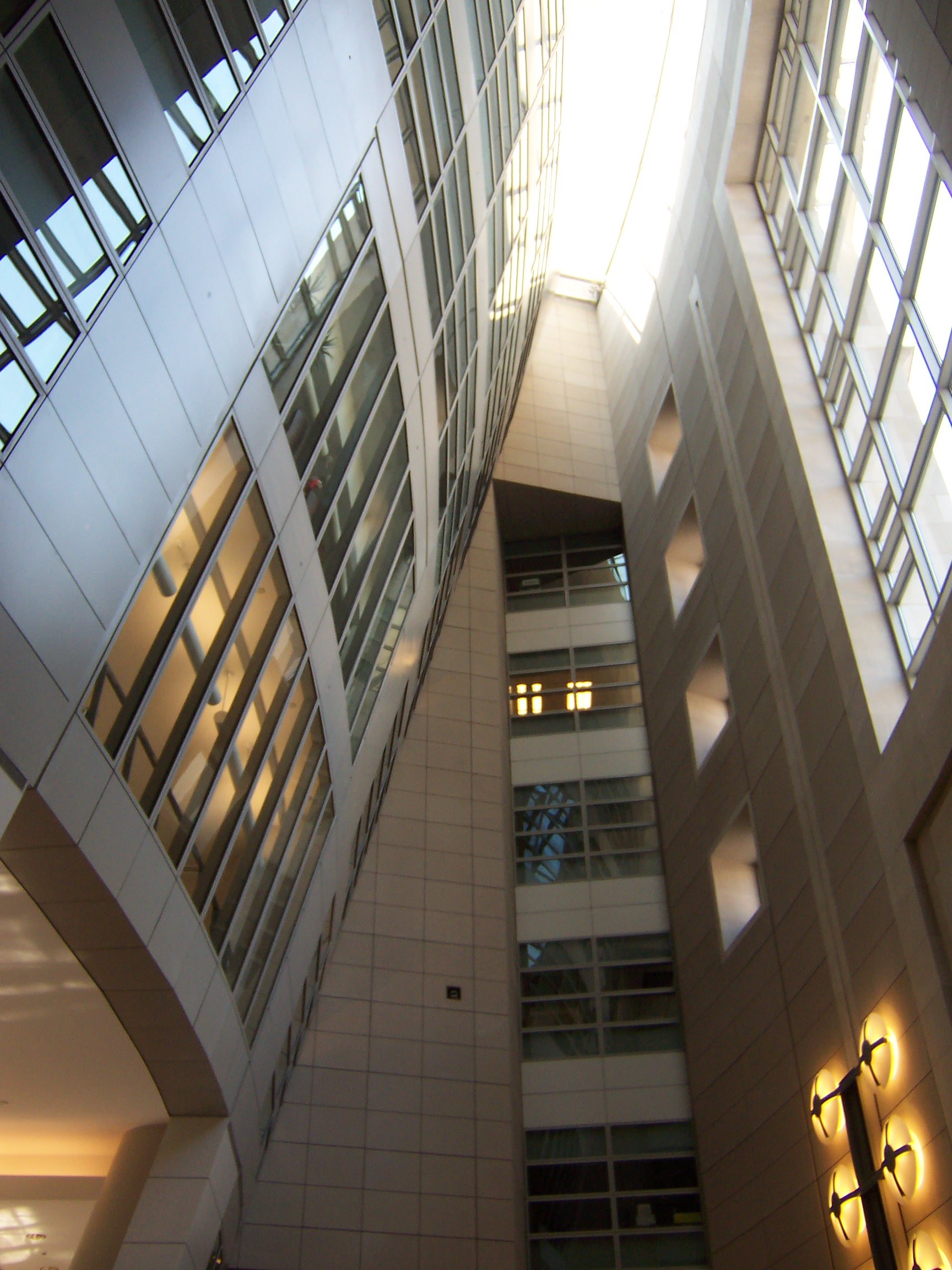
Lobby

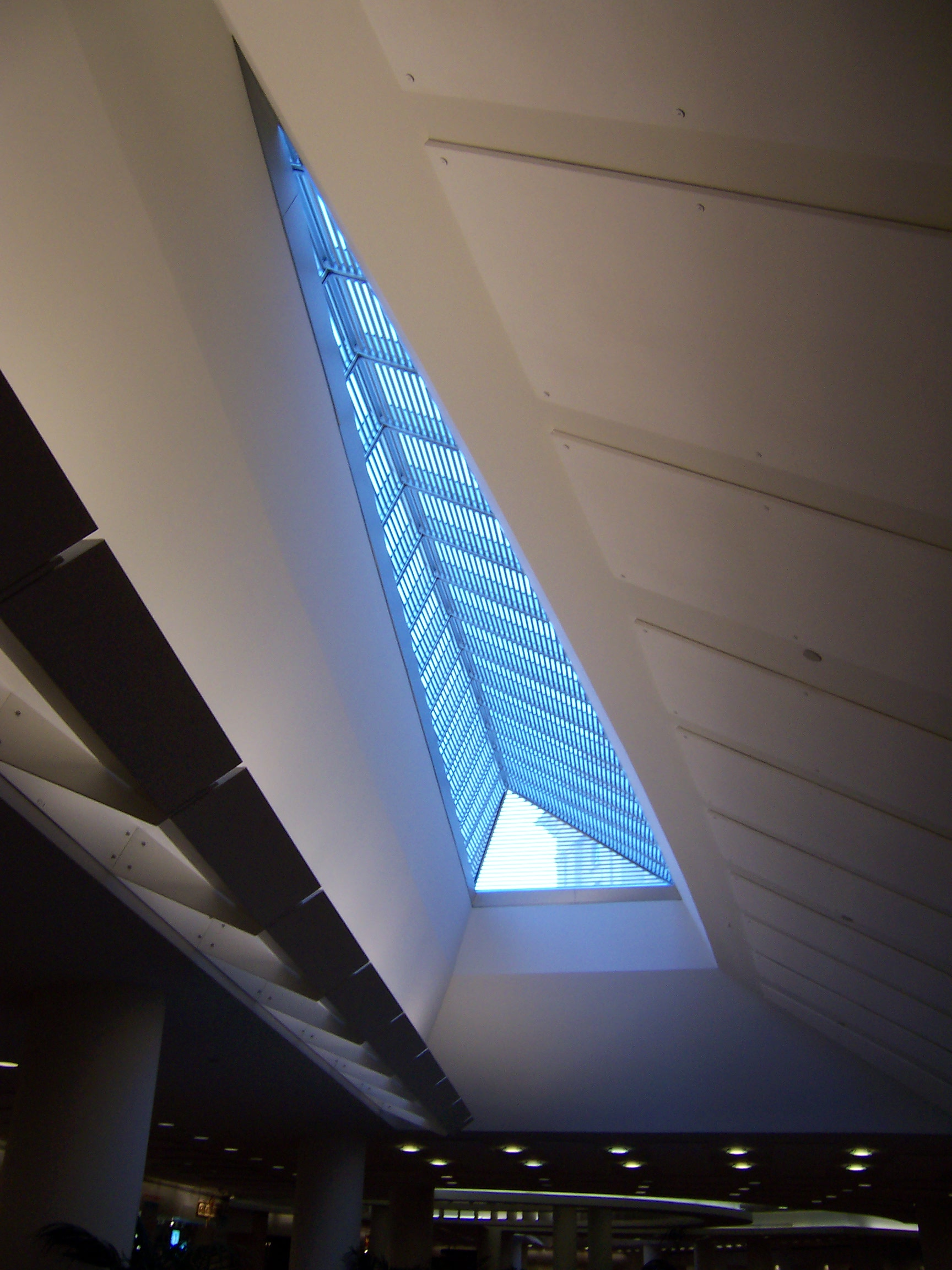
Tetrahedral skylight

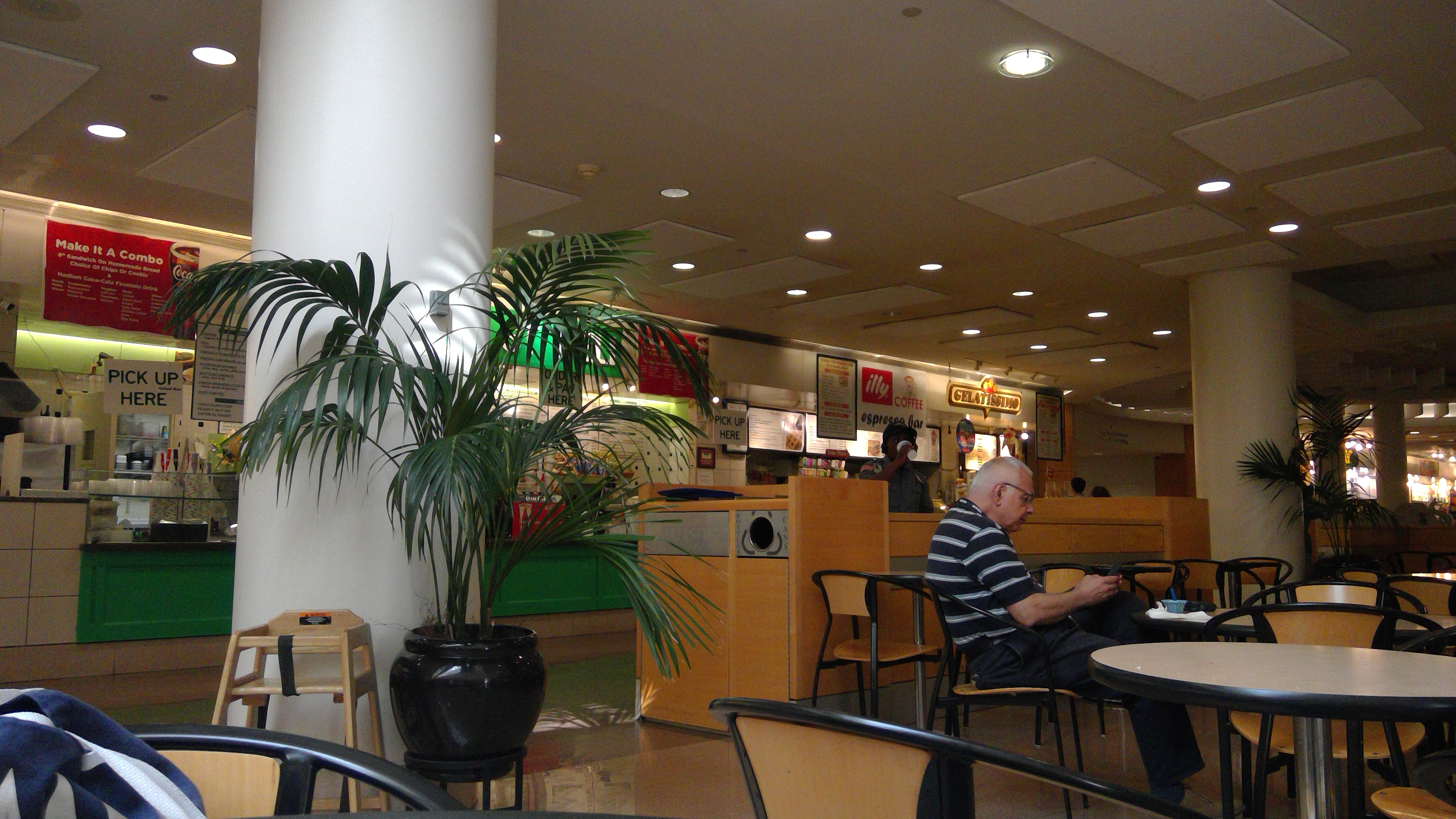
Food court with diner

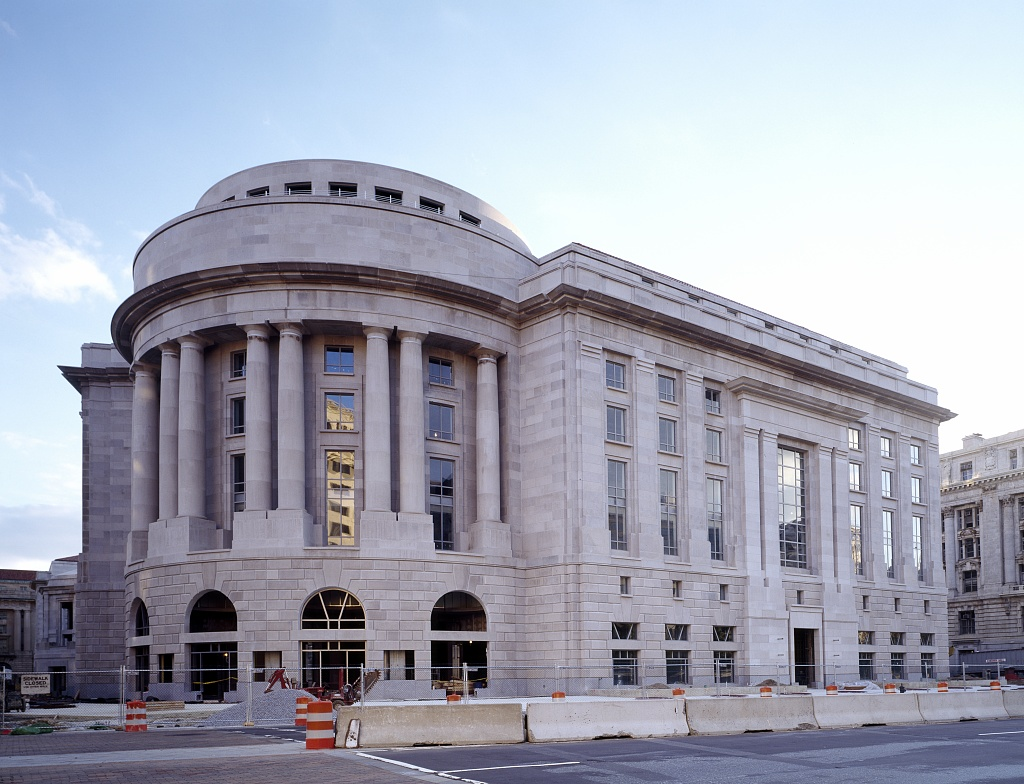
Under construction

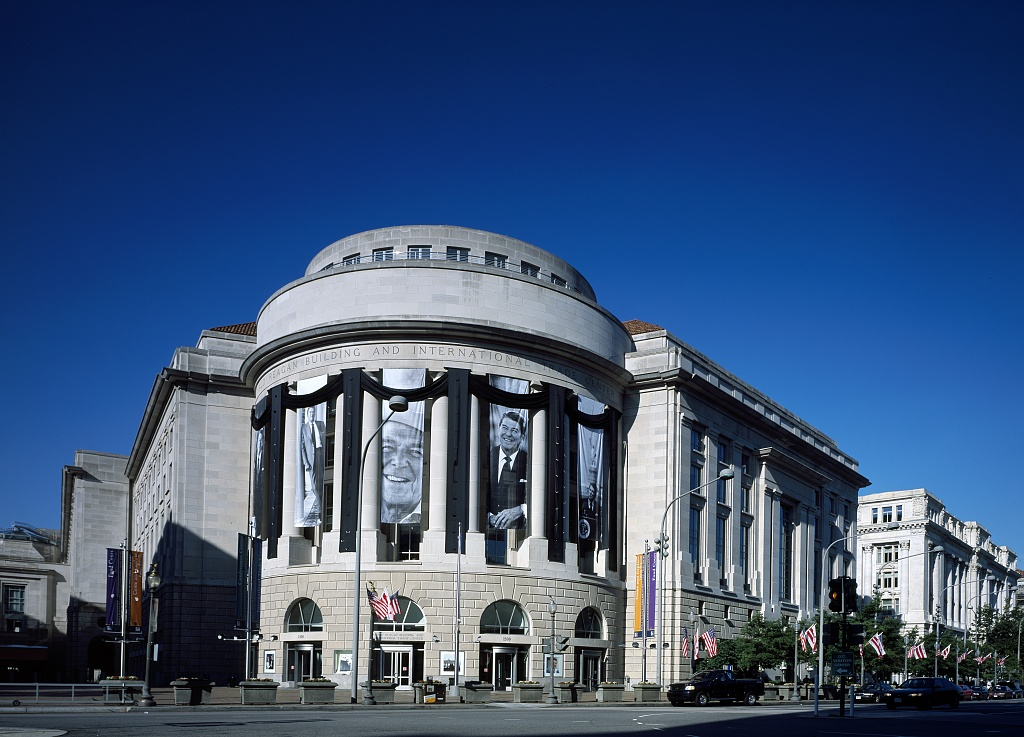
With black drapes and photographs following Reagan's death in 2004

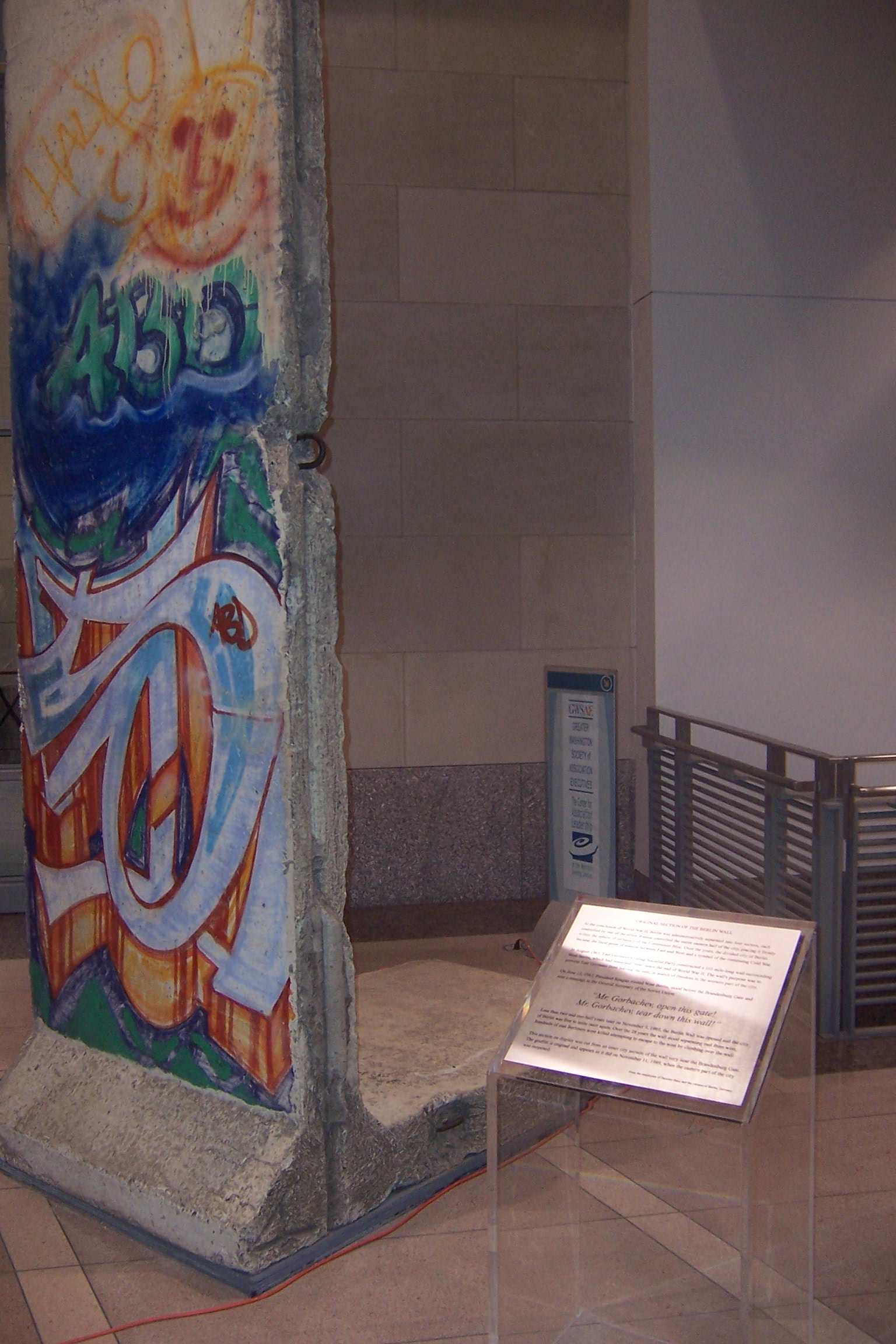
The building houses a segment of the Berlin Wall.

== See also ==
- List of convention centers in the United States
- List of world trade centers
- World Trade Centers Association
- Architecture of Washington, D.C.
