= 1995 Dallas mayoral election =

- May 6, 1995
- Turnout: 23.86%
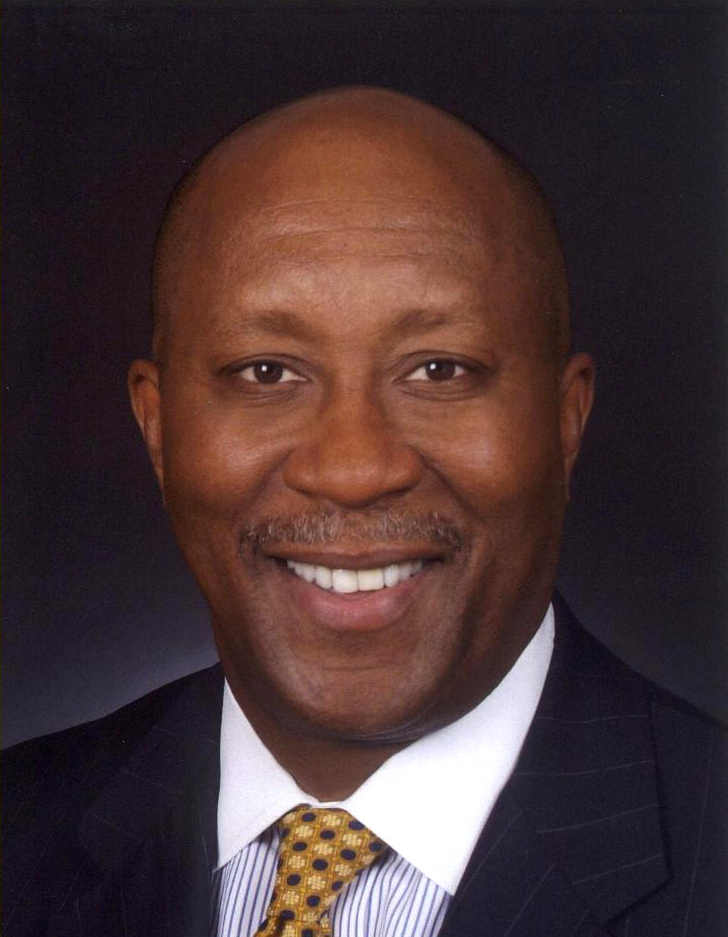

Candidate	Ron Kirk	Darrell Jordan	Domingo García
Popular vote	68,967	25,065	14,066
Percentage	62.32%	22.65%	12.71%
Mayor before election
Steve Bartlett
Elected mayor
Ron Kirk

The 1995 Dallas mayoral election took place on May 6, 1995, to elect the mayor of Dallas, Texas. The race was officially nonpartisan. Ron Kirk won the election, taking a majority in the initial round of voting, thereby negating the need for a runoff to be held.

== Results ==
Results
Party	Candidate	Votes	%
Nonpartisan	Ron Kirk	68,967	62.32
Nonpartisan	Darrell Jordan	25,065	22.65
Nonpartisan	Domingo García	14,066	12.71
Nonpartisan	Roy H. Williams	1,300	1.17
Nonpartisan	Rufus Higginbotham	461	0.42
Nonpartisan	Billy Jack Ludwig	424	0.38
Nonpartisan	Luis Daniel Sepulveda	387	0.35%
Total votes		110,670	
