= Washington International Trade Association =

WITA - The International Trade Membership Association
- Established: 1982
- Type: non-profit
- Headquarters: Ronald Reagan Building and International Trade Center
- Location: 1300 Pennsylvania Avenue, NW Suite G-329, Washington, DC 20004, United States
- Chief Executive Officer: Kenneth I. Levinson
- Website: www.wita.org

WITA - The International Trade Membership Association (WITA) is an organization that hosts forums for discussing issues of international trade in the United States. The meetings hosted by WITA have been used by members of Congress to discuss their goals on trade. Operating as a non-profit, non-partisan organization, WITA itself does not engage in political discussion or debate.

== History ==
WITA was founded in 1982 as a way for those involved in international trade to network and communicate with each other.

In 2004, the Washingtonian named WITA "One of Washington's Top 20 Networking Groups." By 2006 WITA had grown to include 1400 individual members and over 90 corporate sponsors and group members. As of 2021, WITA members exceed 4,000, with Members across the United States and around the world. WITA’s membership is a blend of federal officials, representatives of businesses and NGOs, academics, diplomats, consultants and lawyers, and others interested in international trade.

WITA does not take positions on trade issues or lobby Congress or the executive branch on legislative, regulatory, or enforcement issues. WITA maintains its neutrality through a balanced, bipartisan board that represents the various segments of the trade community; and by ensuring that multiple views of an issue are represented.

== Events ==
WITA holds approximately 30-40 international trade-related events every year. Many of the events take place in the Ronald Reagan Building and International Trade Center. Congressmen, trade ministers, and other notable figures in the international trade sphere have been part of panels and informational sessions regarding international policy. Previous event speakers at WITA have been Senator Max Baucus (D-MT), Senator Chuck Grassley (R-IA), and Representative Kevin Brady (R-TX). In 2010, the South Korean Trade Minister spoke at an event sponsored by WITA. In addition, WITA hosted an event that was held on June 8, 2010 in honor of the FIFA World Cup 2010. The trade event featured a Trade in the Americas panel and A World Cup Kickoff Celebration afterward.

A Trade in the Americas Panel and World Cup Kickoff Celebration was hosted in the Ronald Reagan Building and International Trade Center on June 8, 2010.

Beginning in 2010, WITF and WITA began to organize the Governors and Ambassadors World Trade Reception. The event is attended by officials from the Office of the United States Trade Representative, and also executives from companies looking to expand their international trade networks.

=== Annual Membership Dinner ===
The Annual Membership Dinner is held every summer and is hosted by the Washington International Trade Foundation (WITF) in conjuncture with WITA. The event is widely attended by both members of the United States House of Representatives and the United States Senate, as well as hundreds of top decision-makers, policy shapers, and trade experts from D.C. and around the world.

In 2011, Senator John Kerry (D-MA) and Senator Rob Portman (R-OH) were honored at the WITF/WITA Annual Dinner for their contributions toward the facilitation of international trade. The following year, on July 18, 2012, United States Trade Representative Ron Kirk and Congressman David Dreier (R-CA) were honored at the WITA/WITF Annual Dinner. These events are often mentioned in the Washington Tariff & Trade Letter and other trade publications

On October 11, 2012, WITA hosted a reception in celebration of the 50th Anniversary of the Office of the United States Trade Representative. The event was held 50 years to the day that President John F. Kennedy signed the Executive Order creating the Office of the Special Trade Representative, which occurred on October 11, 1962.

=== Washington International Trade Conference ===
The first annual Washington International Trade Conference (WITC) was held in 2019. The conference covered topics including USMCA, the China-United States trade war, and politics in the age of Donald Trump. The conference had 30 speakers and hosted over 200 attendees.

The second annual WITC was held in 2020 and covered topics including US-China relations, the digital economy and trade, and the 2020 United States presidential election. The conference had 27 speakers and hosted almost 250 attendees.

The third annual WITC was held virtually in 2021 due to the ongoing COVID-19 pandemic. Topics included US-China relations, sustainable trade, digital trade, the revitalization of the World Trade Organization, and neo-progressive trade agendas. The conference had 31 speakers, including Deputy Director-General of the World Trade Organization Alan Wolff and House Ways and Means Committee Chairman Richard Neal. The WITC audience expanded to over 400 attendees, including Director-General of the World Trade Organization Ngozi Okonjo-Iweala.

== Related organizations ==
- The Washington International Trade Foundation (WITF) is a sister organization to WITA and supports its educational activities in addition to being a 501(c)(3) charitable non-profit educational organization.
- Young Trade Professionals (YTP) is another organization, founded as an offshoot of WITA, to help young professionals interested in international trade network with other trade professionals and provide opportunities for professional growth.
