= Wilson Center =

American think tank

Coordinates: 38.8936°N 77.0305°W

Woodrow Wilson International Center for Scholars

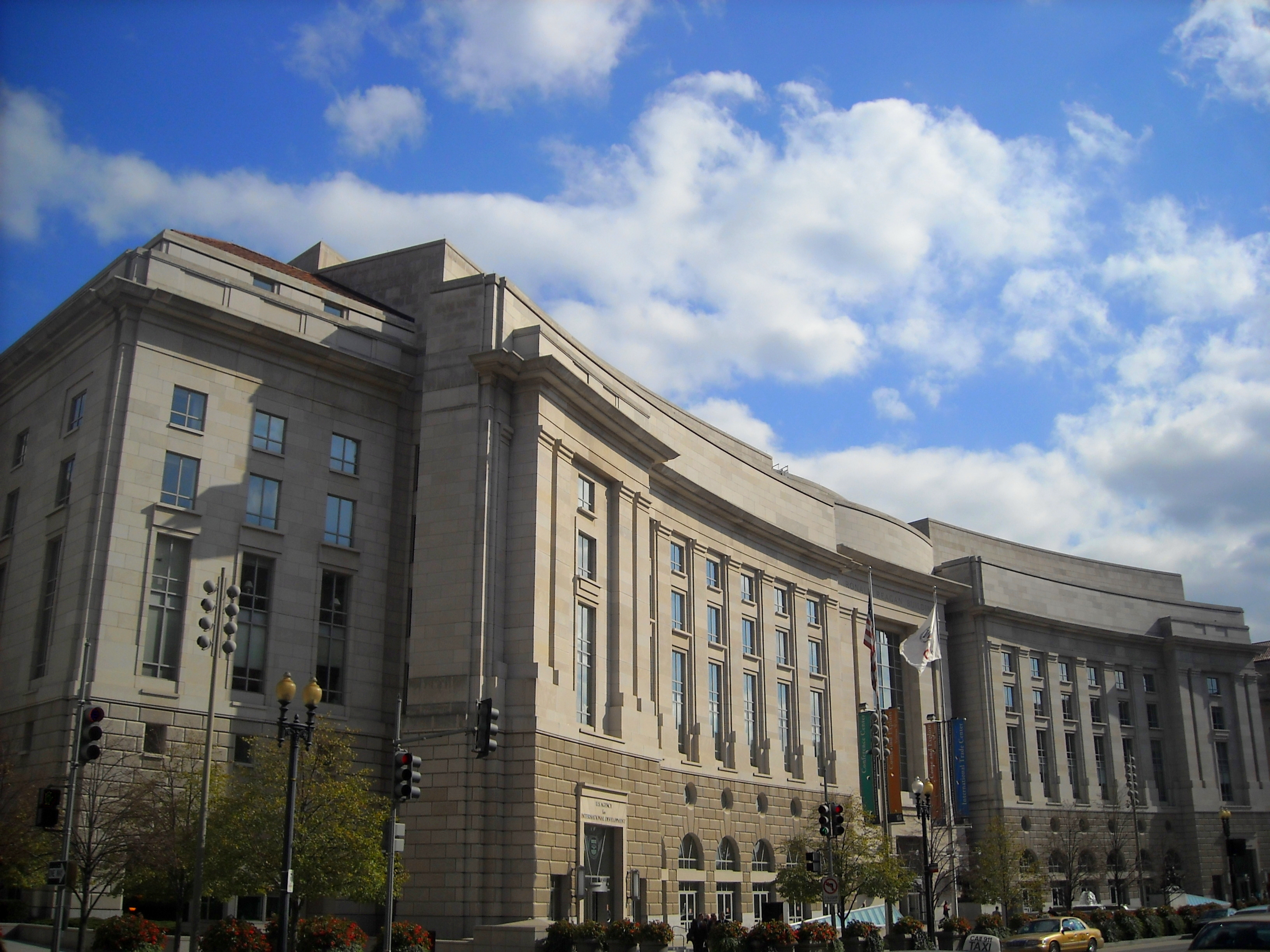
- Ronald Reagan Building and International Trade Center in Washington, D.C., where the Wilson Center is headquartered
- Abbreviation: Wilson Center
- Established: 1968; 58 years ago
- Type: Nonprofit organization (501(c)(3))
- Tax ID no.: 52-1067541
- Legal status: United States Presidential Memorial
- Headquarters: Ronald Reagan Building and International Trade Center
- Location(s): One Woodrow Wilson Plaza; 1300 Pennsylvania Avenue, NW; Washington, D.C. 20004-3027, U.S.
- President emerita and distinguished fellow: Jane Harman
- President and CEO: Natasha Jacome
- Key people: Joe Asher (Chairman, Board of Trustees)
- Affiliations: Smithsonian Institution
- Website: www.wilsoncenter.org

The Woodrow Wilson International Center for Scholars (WWICS) commonly known as the Wilson Center is a Washington, D.C.–based think tank dedicated to research and policy discussions on global issues. Established by an act of the United States Congress in 1968, it serves as both the official presidential memorial to Woodrow Wilson and operates as a part of the Smithsonian Institution.

The Wilson Center describes itself as a nonpartisan think tank and provides a forum for scholars and policymakers to address critical international and domestic challenges. The Wilson Center has been recognized as a leading global think tank. In 2020, the Think Tanks and Civil Societies Program ranked it as the 10th most influential think tank worldwide. It conducts research on international relations, security, economics, and governance, producing reports and hosting discussions that shape policy debates. As of 2025, the Center is chaired by Joe Asher, appointed in 2023, and led by Natasha Jacome, who became President and Chief Executive Officer in 2025, succeeding Mark Andrew Green.

On March 15, 2025, President Donald Trump signed an executive order calling for the elimination of several federally chartered entities, including the Wilson Center. The order directed the reduction of functions and personnel across affected institutions to the minimum required by law. According to Reuters, citing The Times, about 130 employees at the Center were blocked from email access and placed on leave shortly after Elon Musk's government efficiency task force (DOGE) began focusing on the institution. President and Chief Executive Officer (CEO) Mark Andrew Green resigned on April 1, 2025, and later that year Natasha Jacome was appointed as Green's successor.

The Kennan Institute, the largest and oldest part of the Wilson Center, declared itself an independent non-profit in November 2025, with the transfer of its remaining endowment and collection of books and papers out of the control of the Wilson Center.

== Organization ==
The Woodrow Wilson International Center for Scholars was established within the Smithsonian Institution, but it has its own board of trustees, composed both of government officials and of private citizens appointed by the president of the United States. It publishes a digital magazine, the Wilson Quarterly.

The center functions as a public–private partnership with approximately one-third of its operating funds providing annually through a federal appropriation of the U.S. government and the remainder derived from foundations, grants, contracts, corporations, individuals, endowment income, and subscriptions.

The center is housed in the Ronald Reagan Building and International Trade Center, a federal office complex in Washington, D.C., where it occupies a wing under a long-term rent-free lease arrangement. In March 2017, President Trump proposed a federal budget that would have eliminated the center's public funding, echoing a recommendation called by the Heritage Foundation earlier that year. The Heritage Foundation again called for eliminating federal appropriations to the center in its "Budget Blueprint for FY2023", estimating savings of between $16 million and $21 million per year. In November 2022, the Russian government labeled the center an "undesirable organization" under Russian law, prohibiting its activities in the country.

== Administration ==
The board of trustees, currently chaired by David Mansdoerfer, is appointed to six-year terms by the U.S. president.

The board of directors include Mansdoerfer, private citizen members Nick Adams, Alan N. Rechtschaffen, Daniel Abrahamson, Brittany Collins and Sean Sanders. Public members include Lonnie Bunch, William English, Robert F. Kennedy Jr., Linda McMahon, Robert Randolph Newlen, Marco Rubio.

On January 28, 2021, Mark Andrew Green was announced as the Wilson Center's new president, director, and CEO, and he began his term on March 15, 2021.

On January 20, 2025, Donald Trump announced on Truth Social that Brian Hook was fired.

== Programs ==
Most of the center's staff form specialized programs and projects covering broad areas of study. Key programs include the Cold War International History Project, Environmental Change and Security Program, History and Public Policy Program, Kennan Institute, the Kissinger Institute, and the North Korea International Documentation Project.

== See also ==
- A National Strategic Narrative, a report published by the center in 2011
- Presidential memorials in the United States
