= Susan Schwab =

15th United States Trade Representative

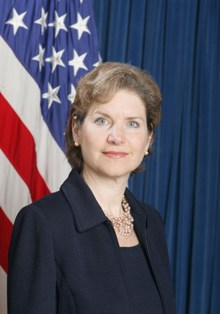

15th United States Trade Representative
- In office June 8, 2006 – January 20, 2009
- President: George W. Bush
- Preceded by: Rob Portman
- Succeeded by: Ron Kirk

Personal details
- Born: March 23, 1955 (age 71) Washington, D.C., U.S.
- Party: Republican
- Education: Williams College (BA); Stanford University (MA); George Washington University (PhD)

Susan Caroll (née Carol) Schwab (born March 23, 1955) is an American politician, who served under President George W. Bush as the United States Trade Representative from June 2006 to January 2009. She has been a professor of public policy at the University of Maryland and held board positions with Caterpillar, FedEx, Boeing and Marriott International

== Early life and education ==
Schwab’s parents, Gerald and Joan Schwab, were both survivors of The Holocaust and emigrated to the United States as children. The couple were married on December 25, 1949.

Her mother, Joan Schwab (née Nussbaum), was born in Berlin, Germany in 1926. She and her twin brother Hans were sent by their parents on a Kindertransport to the United Kingdom. Learning that both parents had perished in the Auschwitz, Joan emigrated to the United States in 1947. Joan Schwab died in 2016.

Her father, Gerald (Gerd) Abraham Schwab was born in Freiburg im Breisgau, Germany in 1925. The family emigrated to the United States in 1944. Schwab later volunteered for the U.S. Army and served with the 10th Mountain Division. After the war, he served as a translator during the International Military Tribunal in Nuremberg. He studied political science at the University of Chicago and Stanford before launching a career in the American foreign service6 working for the U.S. Department of State, the U.S. Agency for International Development and the International Labor Organization. He is the author of The Day the Holocaust Began: The Odyssey of Herschel Grynszpan (1990) and OSS Agents in Hitler's Heartland: Destination Innsbruck (1996). Gerald Schwab died in 2014.

Susan Schwab was born on March 23, 1955. She and her sister Theresa grew up living abroad. She spent 14 of her first 18 years moving with her parents to Togo, Nigeria, Sierra Leone, Tunisia and Thailand.

Schwab attended the Aiglon College, a boarding school in Villars Switzerland, for high school from 1969 to 1970. From 1970 to 1972 she attended the International School of Bangkok, where she graduated with a high-school diploma. She later earned a B.A. in Political Economy from Williams College in 1976. She holds a MA in Developmental Policy from Stanford (1977) and a PhD in Public ManagementAdministration and International Business from George Washington University (1993). Her PhD dissertation, Trade-Offs: Negotiating the Omnibus Trade and Competitiveness Act, was later published as a book by Harvard Business School Press.

== Career ==
=== Foreign service ===
Schwab began her career in 1977 as a trade negotiator with the U.S. Trade Representative and later served as Trade Policy Officer at the United States Embassy in Tokyo. She left the U.S. Foreign Service in 1981.

=== Congresional Aide ===
From 1981 to 1989 Schwab served as a trade policy specialist and later legislative director for Senator John C. Danforth (R-Mo.) Her work involved coordinating multiple U.S. trade policy initiatives which were enacted into law in 1984 and 1988.

Following her time with Danforth, Schwab was nominated by President George H.W. Bush and confirmed by the Senate as Assistant Secretary of Commerce and Director General of the US & Foreign Commercial Service, where she served from 1989 to 1993.

Following her departure from the US Government, Schwab worked for Motorola, Inc. as director of corporate business development.

=== U.S. Trade Representative ===
In 2003, President George W. Bush nominated Schwab to become Deputy Treasury Secretary to replace the outgoing Kenneth Dam.

Schwab was nominated to replace Rob Portman as United States Trade Representative in April 2006 upon Portman's confirmation as director of the Office of Management and Budget. She was confirmed as USTR in June of 2006.

As Trade Representative, Scwab negotiated a resolution to the United States-Canada softwood lumber dispute by signing a deal along with Canadian Trade Minister David Emerson on September 12, 2006. The deal returned to Canada $4 billion out of the $5.3 billion that the country lost in the dispute.

In October 2007, Schwab began negotiations to create foreign trade agreements to enforce anti-counterfeiting protocols. On August 4, 2008, the Anti-Counterfeiting Trade Agreement (ACTA) was announced with the goal of creating a collaborative effort to protect U.S. intellectual property from piracy and counterfeiting.

Schwab launched the talks that became the Trans-Pacific Partnership on behalf of the Bush Administration In September of 2008

In January 2009, in an effort to resolve an ongoing dispute pertaining to a ban on the sale of U.S. beef products throughout the European Union, Schwab announced retaliatory tariffs34 on "dozens" of European luxury items, including French truffles, Irish oatmeal, Italian sparkling water and Roquefort cheese. The European ban on U.S. beef containing hormones was the reason cited by the US for the retaliatory action. Roquefort cheese, made from sheep's milk in a region of southern France, was hit with a 300% tariff, the highest level of any in the package.

Since 2010 Schwab has been an advisor to Mayer Brown LLP.

=== University of Maryland ===
Schwab has been associated with the University of Maryland in numerous capacities. From 1995 to 2003, she served as Dean of the School of Public Policy at the University of Maryland, College Park.

In 2004 she was named as Vice Chancellor of the University System of Maryland, and President and CEO of the University System of Maryland Foundation. From 2009–2019 she was a Professor in the School of Public Policy and remains Professor Emerita.

== Board positions ==
In 2009, FedEx Corporation elected Schwab as a director. That same year, she joined the board of Caterpillar, Inc. From 2010 to 2021 she served on the board of Boeing. In 2015, Schwab was elected to the board of Marriott International.

Other board roles include:

- National Foreign Trade Council, Board of Directors, Chair
- Business Council for International Understanding, Board Member
- The Conference Board, NYC, Vice Chair, Board of Trustees
- Signature Theatre, Arlington, VA, Board Member
- The Do Good Council, University of Maryland, Board Member

== Personal information ==
Schwab is a resident of Annapolis, Maryland.

Schwab was married to Curtis Carroll, a professional magician and comedy hypnotist, from 1996 to 2006. He died in 2006 of liver and kidney failure at the age of 58.

Political offices
Preceded by Rob Portman	United States Trade Representative; 2006–2009	Succeeded by Ron Kirk
