= Demetrios Marantis =

American politician (born 1968)

United States Trade Representative
- Acting
- In office March 15, 2013 – May 23, 2013
- President: Barack Obama
- Preceded by: Ron Kirk
- Succeeded by: Miriam Sapiro (acting)

Personal details
- Born: May 28, 1968 (age 58) Harrison, New York, U.S.
- Party: Democratic
- Education: Princeton University (BA); Harvard University (JD)

Demetrios J. Marantis (born May 28, 1968) is an American lawyer, former senior government trade official, lobbyist and executive. He served as the acting United States Trade Representative (USTR) from March 15, 2013, until May 23, 2013. He served as the Deputy Trade Representative for four years under Ron Kirk, and became the acting Trade Representative when Kirk resigned in March 2013. He is one of 5 openly gay men to have served in the Cabinet of the United States.

== Early life and education ==
Marantis attended Harrison High School in Harrison, New York. He received a Bachelor of Arts in public and international affairs from Princeton University in 1990. He then attended the Harvard Law School, where he received his juris doctor in 1993. Out of law school, Marantis joined the law firm of Akin Gump Strauss Hauer & Feld, working in Washington, D.C., and Brussels.

== Public sector career ==
Marantis joined the Office of the U.S. Trade Representative (USTR) in 1998 as its associate general counsel. In 2002, Marantis joined the U.S.-Vietnam Trade Council, living in Hanoi for two years, aiding United States–Vietnam trade relations. He returned to the United States to work on John Kerry's 2004 presidential campaign as an issue director for John Edwards, Kerry's running mate.

Marantis worked for United States Senate Committee on Finance as the chief international trade counsel, starting in 2005. He aided Max Baucus, the committee's chairman, negotiate an expansion of the Trade Adjustment Assistance, and helped secure passage of the Korea-U.S. Free Trade Agreement. The ranking Republican member of the committee, Charles Grassley, praised Marantis for his efforts. He was nominated by President Obama and confirmed by the U.S. Senate in early 2009 to serve as the Deputy Trade Representative, in charge of negotiating trade pacts in Asia and Africa and negotiating with China on tariffs and copyright laws.

== Post-government career ==
Marantis founded and led the government relations team at Square (now Block, Inc.) from 2013 to 2015.

In October 2015, Marantis was appointed Senior Vice President for Global Government Relations at Visa Inc. While at Visa, Marantis helped create the Visa Economic Empowerment Institute, spearheaded COVID relief of women-owned small and micro entrepreneurs, and urged governments around the world to prioritize digital trade with Africa and other regions.

In September 2021, Marantis joined JPMorgan Chase in September 2021 as Global Head of Corporate Responsibility.

He currently serves as President of the National Foreign Trade Council Foundation, runs a geopolitical advisory firm (MarantisGlobal LLC), and sits on several advisory boards.

== Personal life ==
Marantis lives in Washington D.C., with his husband, society hair stylist Christophe Jouenne. They were married in San Francisco in 2019.

Political offices
Preceded by Ron Kirk	United States Trade Representative; Acting; 2013	Succeeded by Miriam Sapiro; Acting
