= Suk Hi Kim =

Suk Hi Kim is the editor of North Korean Review and a senior professor of international finance at the University of Detroit Mercy in the United States. He is the founding editor of the Multinational Business Review .

== Selected publications ==
- Economic Sanctions Against a Nuclear North Korea: An Analysis of United States and United Nations Actions Since 1950 (co-editor; McFarland, 2007)
- Global Corporate Finance (co-author; Wiley-Blackwell, 2006)
- Basics of Financial Management (co-author; Copley, 2004)
- North Korea at a Crossroads (McFarland, 2003)

== See also ==
- Institute for North Korean Studies
