= History and Public Policy Program =

- Type: INGO
- Purpose: Research organization focusing on the relationship between history and policy making
- Headquarters: Ronald Reagan Building and International Trade Center One Woodrow Wilson Plaza 1300 Pennsylvania Ave. NW Washington, DC 20004-3027
- Location: Washington, DC
- Official language: English
- Director: Christian F. Ostermann
- Parent organization: Woodrow Wilson International Center for Scholars
- Website: www.wilsoncenter.org/program/history-and-public-policy-program

The History and Public Policy Program (HAPP) is a program at the Woodrow Wilson Center.

== Overview ==
The HAPP strives to make public the primary source record of 20th and 21st century international history from repositories around the world, to facilitate scholarship based on those records, and to use these materials to provide context for classroom, public, and policy debates on global affairs.

== Projects ==
The HAPP builds on the pioneering work of the Cold War International History Project in the archives of the former communist world, but seeks to move beyond integrating historical documents into the scholarly discourse.

The HAPP coordinates advanced research on diplomatic history (through the work of the Cold War International History Project); regional security issues (through its North Korea International Documentation Project); nuclear history (through its Nuclear Proliferation International History Project); and global military and security issues such as its work on the history of the Warsaw Pact and European Security (with European Studies at the Wilson Center).

== Archive ==
The HAPP's Digital Archive contains once-secret documents from governments all across the globe, uncovering new sources and providing fresh insights into the history of international relations and diplomacy.

== Cooperation ==
The HAPP operates in partnership with governmental and non-governmental institutions and partners in the US and throughout the world to foster openness, transparency, and dialogue. In cooperation with the American Historical Association's National History Center, the HAPP hosts the Washington History Seminar, a weekly in-depth discussion of important new historical research and perspectives in international and national affairs.
