= Satellite imagery in North Korea =

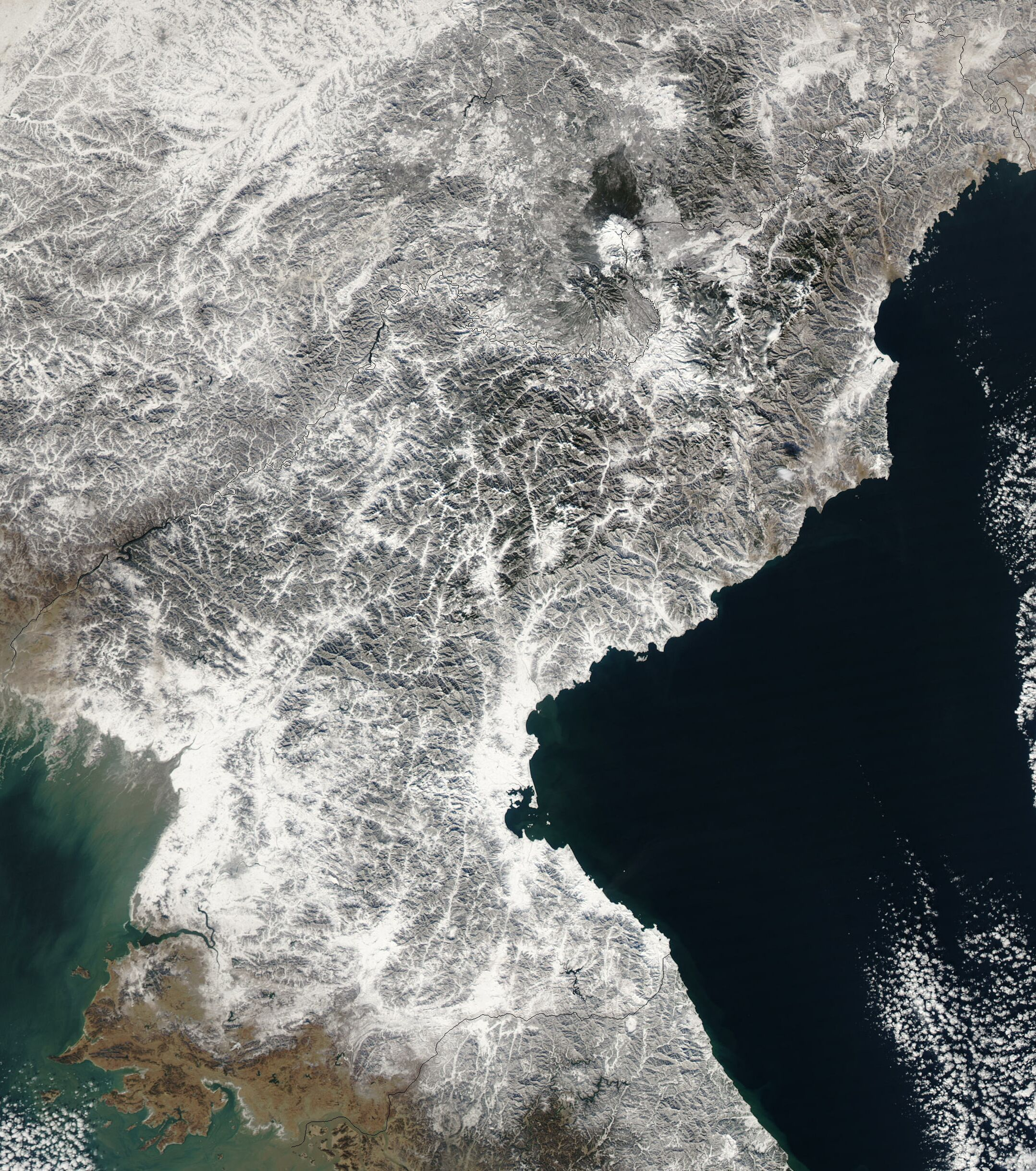
Satellite image of North Korea in December 2002. Captured by NASA with the Aqua satellite.

Satellite imagery in North Korea is a knowledge-building tool in the field of North Korean studies. It enables researchers to produce data-based analyses in the agricultural, humanitarian, economic and military fields, in a country where access to the field is limited.

== Context ==
Collecting data on North Korea is very difficult. States generally produce reliable data, but in North Korea the data produced is often non-existent or of poor quality. When the North Korean government does produce data, its completeness and relevance are often called into question.

Access to the country is limited and satellite imagery is sometimes the only way to get an overview of important political or military locations.

== History ==
=== Started in 1999 and emerging in 2012 ===
High-resolution satellite imagery (1 metre and less) has been available since 1999, but its use for North Korean studies did not emerge until 2012. By 2004, researchers and NGOs had imaging and computing capabilities comparable to those available to the US government 20–30 years earlier, in the 1970s. Prior to 2012, imagery was largely focused on nuclear sites in North Korea, notably Yongbyon and Punggue-ri.

Satellite images with a resolution of less than one metre can be used to identify a wide range of objects such as buildings, forests, orchards, fields, fences, rivers, railways and roads.

At the same time as improving resolution, satellite images make spectral analysis accessible, beyond the visible light spectrum. SARs provide a 3D rendering of the earth, even in rainy weather or at night.

=== Obstacle to the acquisition of satellite images ===
The development of analyses based on satellite images has been hampered by a number of factors: the cost of acquiring these images, the decision by satellite imagery companies not to include images of the country in their public catalogues for political or technical reasons, or simply as a management decision.

=== Speeding up satellite image acquisition ===
The use of satellite imagery has been boosted by technological improvements, the expansion of the satellite imagery industry and public interest in North Korea, prompting satellite imagery companies to capture more frequently and highlight this product on their catalogues.

== Difficulties of analysis and risks of misinformation ==
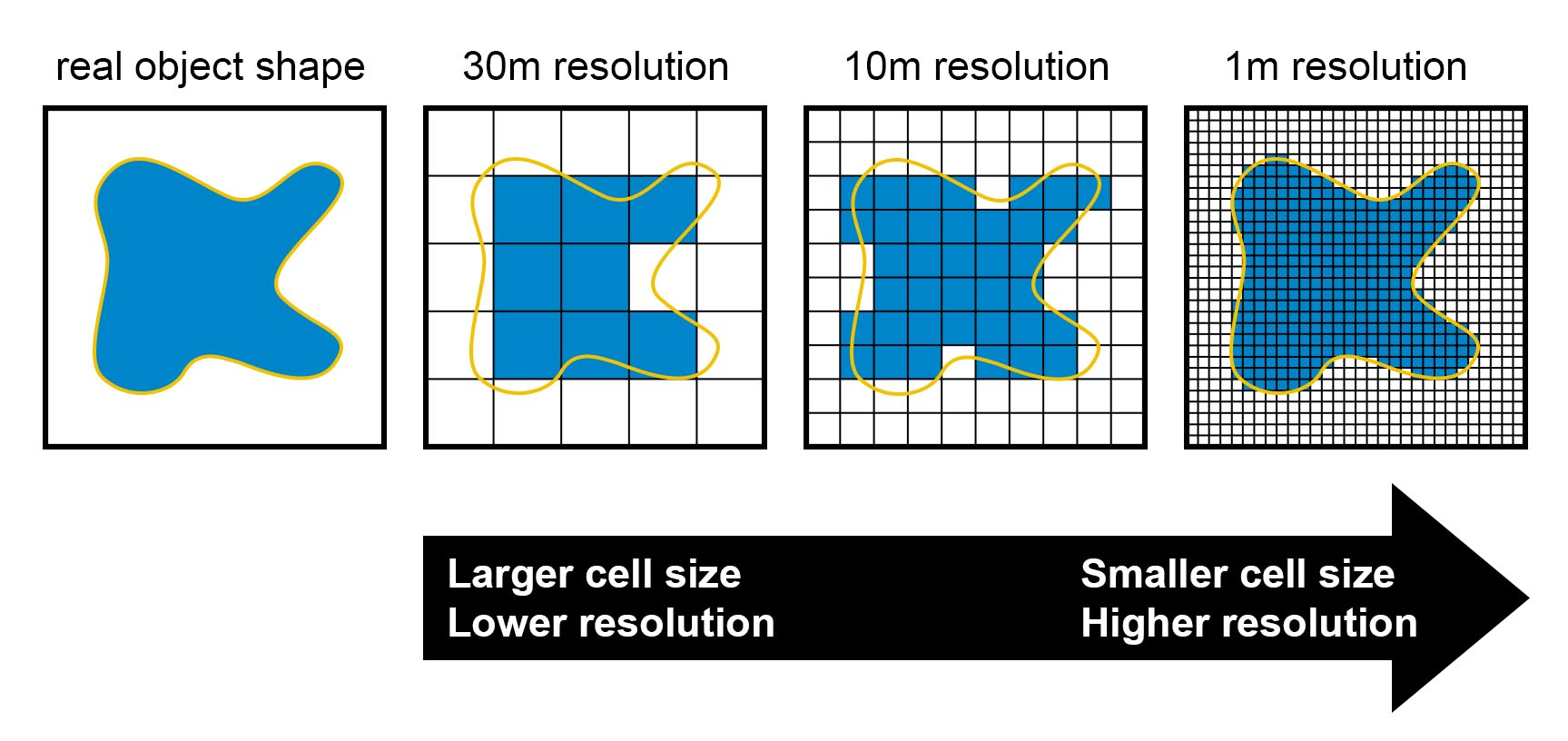
Diagram of different satellite imagery resolutions.

Despite the name "high-resolution image" the analysis of satellite images is hampered by the quality of the images available, leaving more or less room for interpretation as well as by the frequency of image capture. Analysis is dependent on the analysts' cultural, technical knowledge and experience of the specific country context. This is exacerbated for observation of North Korea's nuclear programme. To produce robust information satellite imagery must be cross-referenced with other data sources to understand long-term dynamics.

The growing competition in the field of North Korea studies and the resulting pressure on researchers to be the first to produce a scientific paper is a source of haste in the analysis. The analysis is constructed with less information. Over-extrapolation from satellite images can lead to major errors in analysis.

In a context of short, rapid media cycles, brief or incomplete analyses based on satellite imagery can lead to the dissemination of misinformation, even unintentionally.

The number of experts in the analysis of satellite imagery in North Korea is limited, but recognition algorithms can partially mitigate this problem.

=== North Korea's adaptation ===
North Korea is adapting to the high level of surveillance of its territory by satellite images, so the examination of any satellite image must take into account the possibility of concealment, camouflage or even deception by the North Koreans.

== Usage ==
=== Economic ===
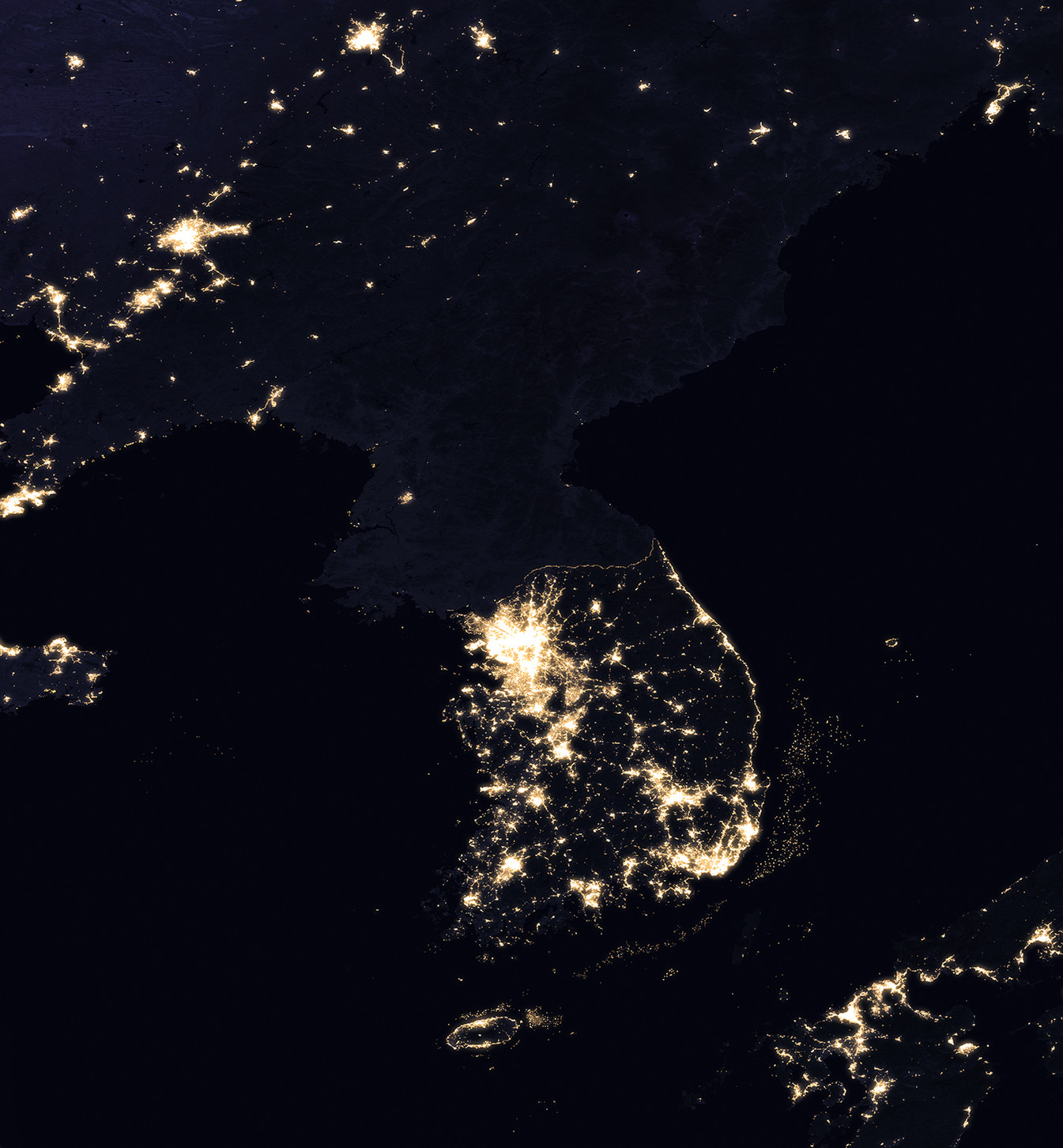
Satellite image of the Korean peninsula at night, captured by NASA.

Analysis of satellite imagery creates knowledge based on new data to better understand activities in North Korea in areas where data acquisition is difficult, such as infrastructure development, construction projects, smuggling activities, etc.

Imagery via Google Earth of the country has enabled researcher Benjamin Katzeff to analyse markets in North Korea by their location their size and geographical distribution, and then approximate economic aggregates, such as reported taxes.

Imagery is used to observe regional and national development patterns and trends or to observe activities violating sanctions against North Korea such as fishing activities.

=== Agriculture ===
Satellite imagery is used to monitor agricultural and food production. Changes in weather conditions (flooding, drought, etc.) are tracked in agricultural areas to estimate harvest possibilities. Examination of areas hit by typhoons has enabled an analysis of the impact on harvests, enabling food needs to be assessed and humanitarian aid to be provided.

=== Humanitarian aid ===
Some NGOs use satellite images to study the progress of their project as they are not always on the ground.

=== Military ===
==== Nuclear and weapons of mass destruction ====
Analysis of satellite imagery allows us to understand the development of North Korea's nuclear arsenal by observing the infrastructure and activity of nuclear sites. This is sometimes the only way to observe North Korea's nuclear programme, as international and US experts are rarely admitted to the country's nuclear sites.

=== Human rights ===
Satellite imagery is very useful in the field of human rights in the country. The U.S. Committee for Human Rights in North Korea has published reports using satellite imagery and defector testimony to analyse the infrastructure and activity of prison camps, particularly to understand renovations, extensions or closures of these sites.

== Satellite imagery producer ==
There are different types of imagery providers. They are military, governmental or commercial

Military

- United States Government, through the National Reconnaissance Office (classified documents)

Government

- Landsat (by the USGS)
- European Union, with research programmes (Copernicus...)

Commercial

- Maxar Technologies, formerly known as Digital Globe (0.3 m)
- Airbus DS Geo (0.5 m)
- ESRI
- Planet Labs (imagery captured at daily frequency, 3m)
