= McFarland & Company =

American publishing company (founded 1979)

- Status: Active
- Founded: 1979; 47 years ago
- Founder: Robert Franklin
- Country of origin: United States
- Headquarters location: Jefferson, North Carolina
- Distribution: Self-distributed (Note: Americas); Eurospan Group (Note: Europe, Australia, Asia, and Africa)
- Key people: Robert Franklin; Rhonda Herman
- Publication types: Academic and adult nonfiction, monographs, reference material, scholarly journals
- Nonfiction topics: Pop culture, sports, military history, transportation, chess, medieval studies, literary criticism, librarianship
- No. of employees: About 50
- Official website: mcfarlandbooks.com

McFarland & Company, Inc., is an American independent book publisher based in Jefferson, North Carolina, that specializes in academic and reference works, as well as general-interest adult nonfiction.

Its president is Rhonda Herman. Its current Editor-in-Chief is Steve Wilson. Its former president and current President Emeritus is Robert Franklin, who founded the company in 1979.

McFarland employs a staff of about 50, and as of 2019 had published 7,800 titles. McFarland's initial print runs average 600 copies per book.

== Subject matter ==
McFarland & Company focuses mainly on selling to libraries. It also utilizes direct mailing to connect with enthusiasts in niche categories. The company is known for its sports literature, especially baseball history, as well as books about chess, military history, and film. In 2007, the Mountain Times wrote that McFarland publishes about 275 scholarly monographs and reference book titles a year; Robert Lee Brewer reported in 2015 that the number is about 350.

== Publications ==
=== Notable book series ===
The following book series are among those published by McFarland & Company:

- "Contributions to Zombie Studies" (edited by Kyle William Bishop)
- "Critical Explorations in Science Fiction and Fantasy" (edited by C. W. Sullivan III and Donald Palumbo)

=== Scholarly journals ===
The following academic journals are published by McFarland & Company:

- Base Ball: A Journal of the Early Game – focuses on "baseball's early history, from its protoball roots to 1920"
- Black Ball: A Journal of the Negro Leagues – focuses on "all subjects related to black baseball, including the Negro major and minor leagues, and pre–Negro league play"
- Clues: A Journal of Detection – focuses on "all aspects of mystery and detective material in print, television and movies"
- Journal of Information Ethics – focuses on information ethics and information science
- Journal of Territorial and Maritime Studies – focuses on "global territorial and maritime issues"
- North Korean Review – focuses on an understanding of North Korea's "complexities and the threat it presents to global stability"

== McFarland Award ==
The Society for American Baseball Research (SABR) presents the annual McFarland-SABR Baseball Research Award, presented to authors of the best articles on baseball history or biography completed during the preceding calendar year (published or unpublished). The award was formerly known as the Macmillan-SABR Baseball Research Award from 1987 to 2000.

=== Winners ===
2025

- Mark Armour, "Satchel's Wild Ride: How Satchel Paige Finally Made the Hall of Fame," SABR Baseball Research Journal, Fall 2024
- Richard J. Puerzer, "The 1939 Negro National League Championship Series," The 1939 Baltimore Elite Giants (SABR, 2024)

2024

- Gary Belleville, "The Trailblazing Canadian Trio That Powered the Rockford Peaches Dynasty of 1948-50," Journal of Canadian Baseball / Revue du Baseball Canadien, November 1, 2023

2023

- Charlie Bevis, "Four Girls in Spring 1974: The First Foot-Soldiers of Female Inclusion in Little League Baseball," SABR Baseball Research Journal, Spring 2022
- Yoichi Nagata, Robert K. Fitts, and Mark Brunke, "The 1921 Native American Tours of Japan," Nichibei Yakyu: US Tours of Japan, Volume 1: 1907-1958 (SABR, 2022)
- John Racanelli, "Death and Taxes and Baseball Card Litigation," SABR Baseball Cards Blog, January 8-December 14, 2022

2022

- Bruce Allardice, "Runs, Runs, and More Runs: Pre-Professional Baseball, By the Numbers," SABR Baseball Research Journal, Fall 2021

2021

- Steve Gietschier, "Before We Forget: The Birth, Life, and Death of The Sporting News Research Center," SABR Baseball Research Journal, Spring 2020
- Robert H. Schaefer, "The Fair-Foul Hitting Era: 1864-1876," scheduled for publication in Base Ball 13: New Research on the Early Game, Fall 2021 (McFarland & Co.)

2020

- Emma Baccellieri, "A Brief History of the Many Times Baseball Has Died," Sports Illustrated, August 29, 2019.
- Bill Staples Jr., "Early Baseball Encounters in the West: The Yeddo Royal Japanese Troupe Play Ball in America, 1872," International Pastime, July 18, 2019.
- Dan VanDeMortel, "White Circles Drawn in Crayon," in The Polo Grounds: Essays and Memories of New York City's Historic Ballpark, 1880-1963; ed. Stew Thornley (McFarland & Co.)

2019

- Richard Bak, "The Rise and Fatal Fall of Tenny Blount," unpublished work.
- Robert Fitts, "Baseball and the Yellow Peril," Base Ball: New Research on the Early Game, Vol. 10 (McFarland & Co.)
- John McMurray, "Addie Joss and the Benefit Game," Base Ball: New Research on the Early Game, Vol. 10 (McFarland & Co.)

2018

- Warren Corbett, "The 'Strike' Against Jackie Robinson: Truth or Myth?", Baseball Research Journal, Spring 2017 (SABR)
- Doron Goldman, "1933-1962: The Business Meetings of Negro League Baseball," in Baseball's Business: The Winter Meetings, 1958-2016 (SABR)

2017

- Jack Bales, "The Show Girl and the Shortstop: The Strange Saga of Violet Popovich and Her Shooting of Cub Billy Jurges," Baseball Research Journal, Fall 2016 (SABR)
- Dan Barry, "The Big League Prospect Who Became a Mob Hit Man," New York Times, October 30, 2016

2016

- Richard Bak, "Digging Up Bob Troy," unpublished (subsequently published in Michigan Historical Review #44, No. 1, Spring 2018)
- Doron Goldman, "The Double Victory Campaign and the Campaign to Integrate Baseball," from Who's on First: Replacement Players in World War II, eds. Marc Z. Aaron and Bill Nowlin, 2015 (SABR)
- William Lamb, "Jury Nullification and the Not Guilty Verdicts in the Black Sox Case," Baseball Research Journal, Fall 2015 (SABR)

2015

- David Ball with David Nemec, "The Sam Barkley Case," Base Ball: A Journal of the Early Game, Vol. 7 (McFarland & Co.)
- James Overmyer, "Black Baseball at Yankee Stadium," Black Ball: A Negro Leagues Journal, Vol. 7 (McFarland & Co.)

2014

- Rory Costello, "Olympic Stadium," SABR Baseball Biography Project
- Christopher W. Schmidt, "Explaining the Baseball Revolution," Arizona State Law Journal, Vol. 45, 2013
- Tom Shieber, "The Pride of the Seeknay," Baseball Researcher

2013

- Bruce Allardice, "The Inauguration of This Noble and Manly Game Among Us: The Spread of Baseball in the South Prior to 1870," Base Ball: A Journal of the Early Game, Fall 2012 (McFarland & Co.)
- Ken Fenster, "Earl Mann Beats the Klan: Jackie Robinson and the First Integrated Games in Atlanta," NINE: A Journal of Baseball History and Culture, Spring 2013
- Mitchell Nathanson, "Who Exempted Baseball Anyway? The Curious Development of the Antitrust Exemption That Never Was," Harvard Journal of Sports and Entertainment Law, Spring 2013

2012

- Thomas L. Altherr, "Basepaths and Baselines: The Agricultural and Surveying Contexts of the Emergence of Baseball", Base Ball: A Journal of the Early Game, Fall 2011
- William Lamb, "John B. Day", SABR Baseball Biography Project
- Geri Strecker, "Dave Wyatt: The First Great Black Sportswriter", Black Ball: A Negro Leagues Journal, Spring 2011

2011

- Ron Cobb, "The Georgia Peach: Stumped by the Storyteller", The National Pastime: Baseball in the Peach State, 2010 (SABR)
- Jeff Obermeyer, "Disposable Heroes: Returning World War II Veteran Al Niemiec Takes on Organized Baseball", Baseball Research Journal, Summer 2010 (SABR)
- Geri Strecker, "And the Public Has Been Left to Guess the Secret: Questioning the Authorship of 'The Great Match, and Other Matches' (1877)", NINE: A Journal of Baseball History and Culture, Spring 2010

2010

- Mark Armour, "A Tale of Two Umpires," Baseball Research Journal, Fall 2009 (SABR)
- William F. Lamb, "A Fearsome Collaboration: The Alliance of Andrew Freedman and John T. Brush," Base Ball: A Journal of the Early Game, Fall 2009
- Geri Strecker, "The Rise and Fall of Greenlee Field: Biography of a Ballpark," Black Ball: A Journal of the Negro League, Fall 2009

2009

- David J. Laliberte, "Myth, History and Indian Baseball: An Unexpected Story of the Game in Minnesota"
- William J. McGill, "The Greatest College Pitcher: George Sisler at Michigan"
- David Vaught, "Our Players Are Mostly Farmers: Baseball in Rural California, 1850-1890"

2008

- Henry D. Fetter, "Revising the Revisionists: Walter O'Malley, Robert Moses, and the Death of the Brooklyn Dodgers". (Revised text published under title "Revising the Revisionists: Walter O'Malley, Robert Moses and the End of the Brooklyn Dodgers," in New York History, Vol. 89, No. 1, Winter 2008)
- Frederick Ivor-Campbell, "Knickerbocker Base Ball: The Birth and Infancy of the Modern Game" Base Ball: A Journal of the Negro League, Fall 2007 (McFarland & Co.)
- Dick Thompson, "Cannonball Bill Jackman," The National Pastime #27, 2007 (SABR)

2007

- Brian Carroll, "Early Twentieth Century Heroes: Coverage of Negro League Baseball in the Pittsburgh Courier and the Chicago Defender," Journalism History, Spring 2006
- Mitchell Nathanson, "The Irrelevance of Baseball's Antitrust Exemption: A Historical Review," Rutgers Law Review, Vol. 58, Issue 1, 2005
- Steve Steinberg, "Matty and the Browns: A Window Onto the AL-NL War," NINE: A Journal of Baseball History and Culture, Spring 2006

2006

- Charlie Bevis, "Rocky Point: A Lone Outpost of Sunday Baseball in Sabbatarian New England," NINE: A Journal of Baseball History and Culture, Fall 2005
- Gregory Bond, "Too Much Dirty Work: Race, Manliness And Baseball in Gilded Age Nebraska," Nebraska History
- James Forr, "Pie Traynor," SABR Baseball Biography Project

2005

- Richard Bak, "Bat Out of Hell," included in the author's book Peach: Ty Cobb in His Time and Ours, Sports Media Group, 2005
- Ken Fenster, "Earl Mann, Nat Peeples and the Failed Attempt of Integration in the Southern Association," NINE: A Journal of Baseball History and Culture, Spring 2004

2004

- Charlie Bevis, "Evolution of the Sunday Doubleheader and Its Role in Elevating the Popularity of Baseball." The Cooperstown Symposium on Baseball and American Culture, 2003-04 (McFarland & Co.)
- Bob Gorman and David Weeks, "Foul Play, Fan Fatalities in Twentieth-Century Organized Baseball," NINE: A Journal of Baseball History and Culture, Fall 2003
- Robert H. Schaefer, "The Great Baseball Match of 1858, Base Ball's First All-Star Game," published in NINE: A Journal of Baseball History and Culture, Fall 2005

2003

- Frank Ardolino, "Missionaries, Cartwright and Spalding," NINE: A Journal of Baseball History and Culture, Fall 2002
- Ron Briley, "In the Tradition of Jackie Robinson: Ozzie Virgil and the Integration of the Detroit Tigers," The Cooperstown Symposium on Baseball and American Culture, 2002 (McFarland & Co.)
- Jim McConnell, "Dahlgren, You're in There"

2002

- Bruce Markusen, "Thirty Years Ago … The First All-Black Lineup", MLBlogs.com
- Robert H. Schaefer, "Legend of the Lively Ball," Base Ball: A Journal of the Early Game (McFarland & Co.)
- Dick Thompson, "Baseball's Greatest Hero: Joe Pinder," Baseball Research Journal #30, 2001 (SABR)

2001

- Tom Altherr, "A Place Leavel Enough To Play Ball: Baseball and Baseball-type Games in the Colonial Era, Revolutionary War, and Early American Republic", NINE: A Journal of Baseball History and Social Policy Perspectives
- Robert H. Schaefer, "The Lost Art of Fair-Foul Hitting," The National Pastime #20, 2000 (SABR)
- Dick Thompson, "The Wes Ferrell Story," The National Pastime #21, 2001 (SABR)

2000

- Ron Briley, "As American as Cherry Pie: Baseball and Reflections of Violence in the 1960s and 1970s," The Cooperstown Symposium on Baseball and American Culture, 1999
- Chris Lamb, "L'Affaire Jake Powell: The Minority Press Goes to Bat Against Segregated Baseball," Journalism and Mass Communication Quarterly, Vol. 76, No. 1, Spring 1999
- Stephen Norwood and Harold Brackman, "Going to Bat for Jackie Robinson: The Jewish Role in Breaking Baseball's Color Line," Journal of Sport History, Vol. 26, No. 1, Spring 1999

1999

- David M. Jordan, Larry Gerlach and John Rossi, "A Baseball Myth Exploded," The National Pastime #18, SABR, 1998
- Jim McConnell, "Baseball's Dark Past," Grandstand Baseball Annual
- Andrew O'Toole, "Clemente's First Spring," Elysian Fields Quarterly

1998

- Clifford Blau, "The History of Major League Tie Games"
- John McReynolds, "Nate Moreland, Mystery to Historians," Los Angeles Sentinel, August 13, 1998
- Gary Smith, "Damned Yankee," Sports Illustrated, October 13, 1997

1997

- Adrian Burgos Jr., "Jugando en el Norte: Caribbean Players in the Negro Leagues, 1910-1950," Centro: Journal del Centro de Estudios Puertorriqueños
- Jim Price, "A Half Century of Pain: A retrospective look at the 1946 Spokane Indian bus accident," The Spokesman-Review, June 24, 1996
- Joseph M. Wayman, "Pitching Won-Loss Records, National League, 1890-1899," Grandstand Baseball Annual

1996

- James A. Smith Jr. and Herman Krabbenhoft, "Triple Play Project," The Baseball Quarterly Review
- Hank Thomas & Chuck Carey, for research involved in "The California Comet" on Walter Johnson's California semi-pro career
- Michael O'Grady, "From Covehead to the Polo Grounds: The Story of Henry Haverlock Oxley, Major Leaguer"

1995

- Peter C. Bjarkman, Baseball with a Latin Beat: A History of the Latin American Game
- Robert F. Burk, Never Just a Game: Players, Owners and American Baseball to 1920
- Jack Kavanagh, Walter Johnson: A Life

1994

- Lloyd Johnson and Miles Wolff, The Encyclopedia of Minor League Baseball
- James A. Riley, The Biographical Encyclopedia of the Negro Baseball Leagues
- Michael Gershman, Diamonds: The Evolution of the Ballpark

1993

- Phil Dixon, The Negro Baseball Leagues: A Photographic History
- Barbara Gregorich, Women at Play: The Story of Women in Baseball
- William Ryczek, Blackguards and Red Stockings: A History of The National Association

1992

- Robert Gregory, Diz: The Story of Dizzy Dean and Baseball During the Great Depression
- Herman Krabbenhoft, "Baseball Quarterly Reviews"
- Mark Stang and Linda Harkness, "Rosters!"

1991

- Bruce Kuklick, "To Everything a Season — Shibe Park and Urban Philadelphia 1909-1976"

1990

- Dr. Harold Seymour, Baseball: The People's Game
- Dick Clark, John Holway and James A. Riley, for work on Negro League statistics in The Baseball Encyclopedia (8th edition)
- James E. Miller, "The Baseball Business"

1989

- Bill Deane, Award Voting
- Paul Dickson, The Dickson Baseball Dictionary
- Marc Okkonen, Major League Uniforms of the 20th Century

1988

- Melvin Adelman, for his work on 1820-1870 New York City baseball
- Stew Thornley, "On to Nicollet," a team profile of the Minneapolis Millers
- Bob Tiemann and Rich Topp, for their work cataloging managerial changes

1987

- Andy McCue, Baseball By the Books
- Rob Ruck, The Tropic of Baseball: Baseball in the Dominican Republic
