= North Korean Review =

- Discipline: North Korean studies
- Language: English
- Edited by: Yongho Kim

Publication details
- History: 2005–present
- Publisher: The Institute for North Korean Studies and McFarland (United States)
- Frequency: Biannual

Standard abbreviations
- ISO 4: North Korean Rev.

Indexing
- ISSN: 1551-2789 (print); 1941-2886 (web)
- JSTOR: 15512789
- OCLC no.: 55895634

Links
- Journal homepage

North Korean Review is a biannual peer-reviewed academic journal published by the Institute for North Korean Studies (INKS), at the University of Detroit Mercy in the United States. The journal was established in 2005 by INKS and McFarland & Company. It publishes policy-oriented articles, short papers, commentaries, and case studies on all aspects of North Korea, including culture, history, economics, business, religion, politics, and international relations.

The founding editor of North Korean Review is Suk Hi Kim. The editor-in-chief of the journal is Yongho Kim of Yonsei University, and the managing editor is Lonnie Edge of the Hankuk University of Foreign Studies.

The stated purpose of the journal is to provide an improved understanding of the complexity of North Korea. In March 2006, the Library Journal said that it is "the first journal of its kind" and that it "belongs in most university libraries".
