= University of North Korean Studies =

University in Seoul, South Korea

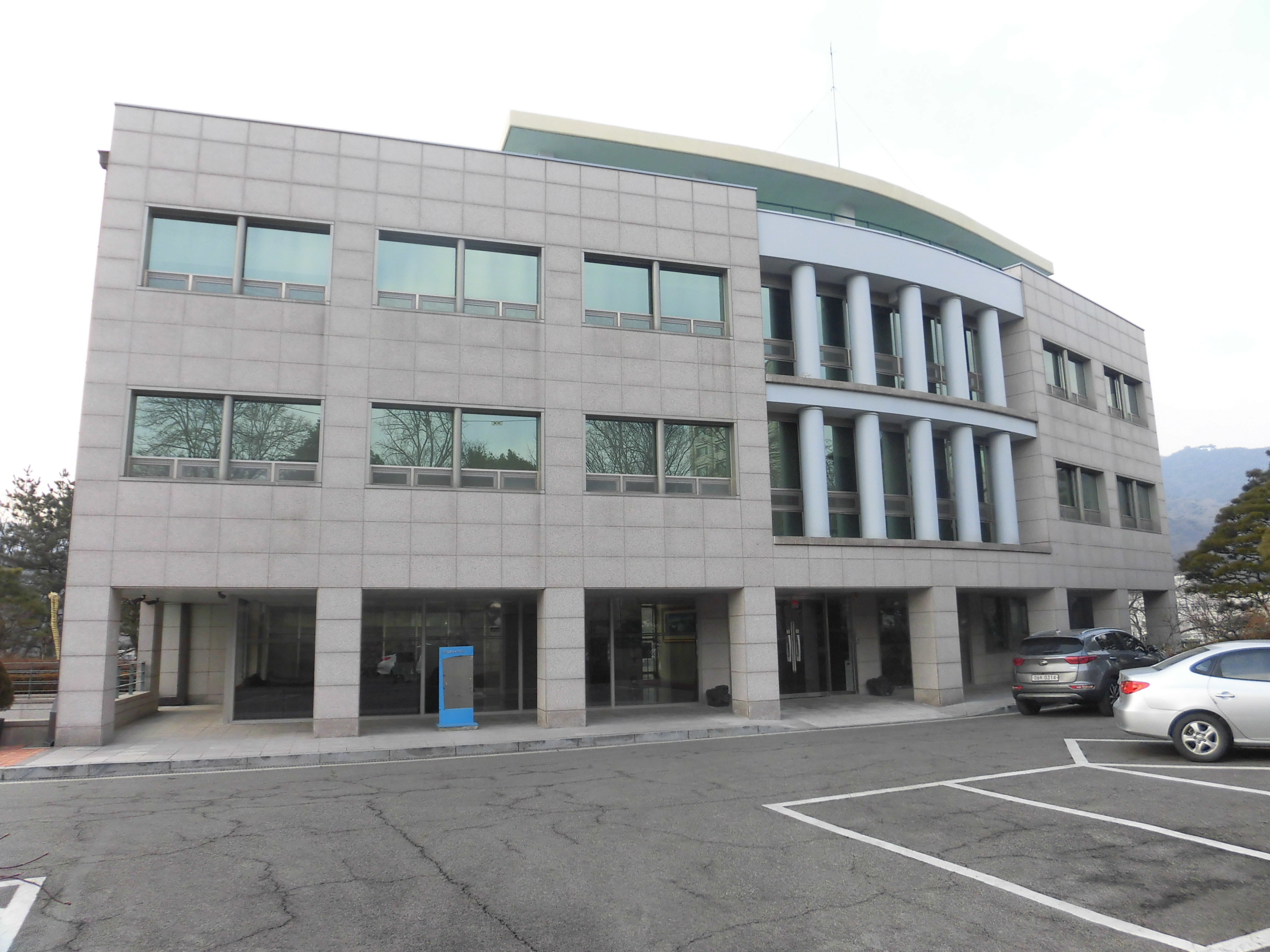
- The main building in Seoul

Korean name
- Hangul: 북한대학원대학교
- Hanja: 北韓大學院大學校
- RR: Bukhan daehagwon daehakgyo
- MR: Pukhan taehagwŏn taehakkyo

The University of North Korean Studies (북한대학원대학교) is a university in Seoul, South Korea, that was founded in 2005 by merging Kyungnam University's North Korean studies department founded in 1997 and the Far East Problems Research Centre (극동문제연구소) founded 1972.

== See also ==
- North Korean studies
