= Cold War International History Project =

The Cold War International History Project (CWIHP) is part of the History and Public Policy Program at the Woodrow Wilson International Center for Scholars. The Project was founded in 1991 with the support of the John D. and Catherine T. MacArthur Foundation, and is located in Washington D.C.

== Mission ==
As part of its mission, the CWIHP supports full and prompt release of historical materials by governments on all sides of the Cold War, seeking to integrate new sources, materials and perspectives from the former Communist bloc with the historiography of the Cold War. In particular, it disseminates new information and perspectives from previously inaccessible sources from the former Communist world on the history of the Cold War. It also seeks to transcend barriers of language, geography, and regional specialization to create new links among scholars interested in Cold War history.

The CWIHP also promotes publications pertaining to findings, views, and activities related to the Cold War; houses the Virtual Archive, the largest collection of translated, archival documents from the former communist bloc, and hosts international scholarly meetings, conferences, and seminars.

== Funding ==
The CWIHP is funded by grants from the John D. and Catherine T. MacArthur Foundation, the Henry Luce Foundation, the Smith Richardson Foundation, the Leon Levy Foundation and many others.

== Publications ==
The Project publishes the CWIHP Bulletin and the CWIHP Working Paper Series, as well as e-dossiers (collection of archival documents), briefing books, etc. The CWIHP Working Paper Series is designed to provide an outlet for historians associated with the Project who have gained access to newly available archives and sources and would like to share their results, especially submissions by junior scholars from the former Communist bloc who have done research in their countries' archives and are looking to introduce their findings to a Western audience.
