= Ron Kirk =

American politician (born 1954)

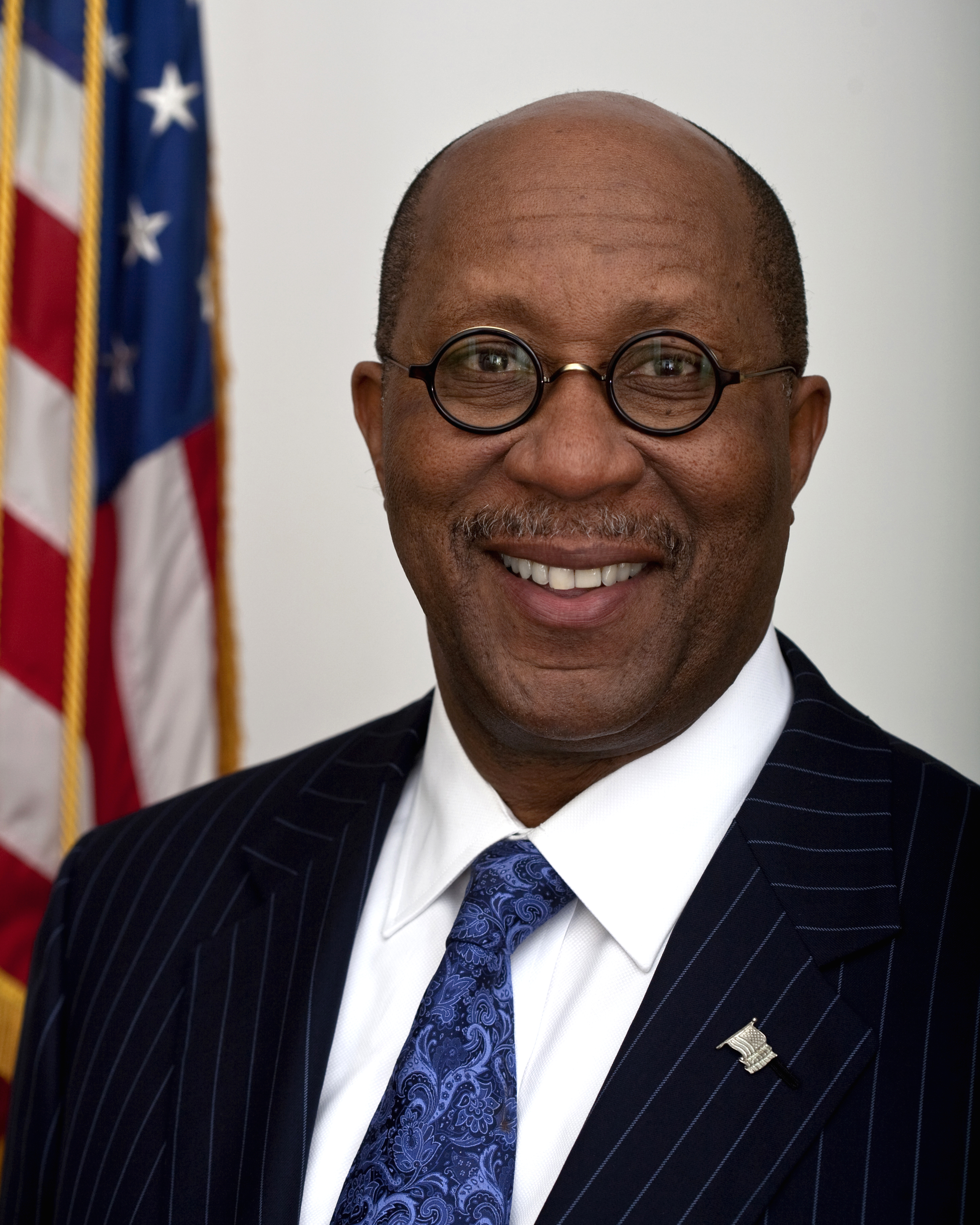
- Official portrait, 2009

16th United States Trade Representative
- In office March 18, 2009 – March 15, 2013
- President: Barack Obama
- Deputy: Demetrios Marantis
- Preceded by: Susan Schwab
- Succeeded by: Michael Froman

56th Mayor of Dallas
- In office June 5, 1995 – February 20, 2002
- Preceded by: Steve Bartlett
- Succeeded by: Laura Miller

97th Secretary of State of Texas
- In office April 4, 1994 – January 17, 1995
- Governor: Ann Richards
- Preceded by: John Hannah
- Succeeded by: Tony Garza

Personal details
- Born: Ronald Kirk; June 27, 1954 (age 71) Austin, Texas, U.S.
- Party: Democratic
- Spouse: Matrice Ellis
- Children: 2 daughters
- Education: Austin College (BA); University of Texas at Austin (JD)

Ronald Kirk (born June 27, 1954) is an American lawyer and politician who served as the United States Trade Representative from 2009 to 2013, as the 97th secretary of state of Texas, and as the 56th mayor of Dallas from 1995 to 2002. He is a member of the Democratic Party.

Born in Austin, Texas, Kirk is a graduate of Austin's John H. Reagan High School, Austin College, and the University of Texas School of Law. From 1994 to 1995, Kirk worked as the secretary of state of Texas, until he was elected as the mayor of Dallas, where he served from 1995 to 2002 and was the first African-American to hold either of those positions. He ran for the United States Senate in 2002, but was defeated by Republican opponent John Cornyn. After his defeat, Kirk worked as a partner at the Houston-based law firm Vinson & Elkins and worked as a lobbyist for Energy Future Holdings and Merrill Lynch.

Kirk was nominated by President Barack Obama to serve as U.S. Trade Representative and on March 18, 2009, and was confirmed by the U.S. Senate in a 92–5 confirmation vote. On January 22, 2013, Kirk announced that he would be stepping down as U.S. Trade Representative

== Early life and career ==
Born in Austin, Texas, Kirk is the youngest of four children; his father was a U.S. postal worker and the family was politically active. He grew up in a predominantly black community, and attended Austin's public schools. He was a leader in high school, and was elected student council president in his senior year at John H. Reagan High School.

Kirk attended Austin College, graduating with a degree in both political science and sociology in 1976. He then went to the University of Texas School of Law. Upon receiving his Juris Doctor in 1979, he practiced law until 1981 when he left to work in the office of then-Texas Senator Lloyd Bentsen. In 1983, Kirk returned to Texas to lobby the state legislature in Austin, first as an attorney with the city of Dallas, and later with a law firm.

Kirk is the nephew of civil rights leader William Astor Kirk.

== Texas political career ==
In 1994, Kirk worked for then-Texas Governor Ann Richards as Secretary of State of Texas. The following year, Kirk ran for mayor of Dallas. With support of Dallas' business community and influential members of the city's African American community, Kirk was successful in his bid and became the first African American mayor of Dallas, Texas, while winning 62 percent of the total vote in 1995.

During his tenure as mayor, Kirk earned the reputation of being a coalition-builder, managing to keep the always-tumultuous Dallas City Council and Dallas School Board together. Under his leadership, he proposed the "Dallas Plan", a vision for the next 25 years, which included the controversial Trinity River Project, a $246 million plan that called for constructing a network of parks and privately owned toll roads in the flood plain of the Trinity River. He also pushed the construction of the American Airlines Center, whose opening he oversaw in 2002.

In 1999, Kirk was re-elected as mayor of Dallas in a landslide with 74 percent of the vote. The only incident in the campaign was a radio campaign ad that used music from Star Trek and described Kirk as the "captain of the Dallas Enterprise", citing the city's bond program, the new sports arena and new roads. The ad was pulled after Paramount's lawyers sent a cease-and-desist letter.

In 2002, Kirk resigned as mayor of Dallas in order to run for the Senate seat vacated by retiring Republican Phil Gramm. Facing then-Texas Attorney General John Cornyn; Kirk lost with 43 percent of the vote to Cornyn's 55 percent.

== Post-mayoral career ==
Following his failed bid for Senate, Kirk returned to the law firm of Gardere Wynne Sewell in Dallas. He was briefly a candidate for chairman of the Democratic National Committee after the 2004 election. Later he was a partner with the Houston-based law firm Vinson and Elkins, where, according to Texans for Public Justice, he was, as of March 2007, one of the four highest paid lobbyists for Energy Future Holdings Corporation.

During the Democratic National Convention, Kirk came out in favor of establishing the U.S. Public Service Academy as a civilian counterpart to the military service academies.

== U.S. Trade Representative ==
Although there was speculation that Kirk would be appointed Secretary of Transportation by President Barack Obama, he was given the position of Trade Representative.

=== Nomination ===
As a supporter of the North American Free Trade Agreement (NAFTA), his selection drew criticism from opponents of free trade policies. His nomination ran into further controversy when it was revealed that he owed $9,975 in back taxes. As compensation for speeches he gave from 2004 to the present, he had $37,750 of payments made directly to a scholarship fund at Austin College. Kirk should have included the $37,750 payments with his gross income and then claimed a charitable deduction for the same amount. Kirk also claimed deductions for three years of season tickets to the Dallas Mavericks as qualifying entertainment expenses. In order to claim a qualifying entertainment expense, the Internal Revenue Service requires written documentation of the time, place, business purpose, name, and business relationship of the person being entertained, records that Kirk did not keep for almost half of the basketball games. Kirk's deductions for tax and accounting fees were also too large.

The U.S. Senate confirmed Kirk as United States Trade Representative on March 18, 2009, with a vote of 92 in favor and five opposed and he was sworn in the same day. Kirk was formally sworn in by Vice President Joe Biden on March 20, 2009. Kirk is the first person of African American descent to hold the position of United States Trade Representative.

=== Work as U.S. Trade Representative ===
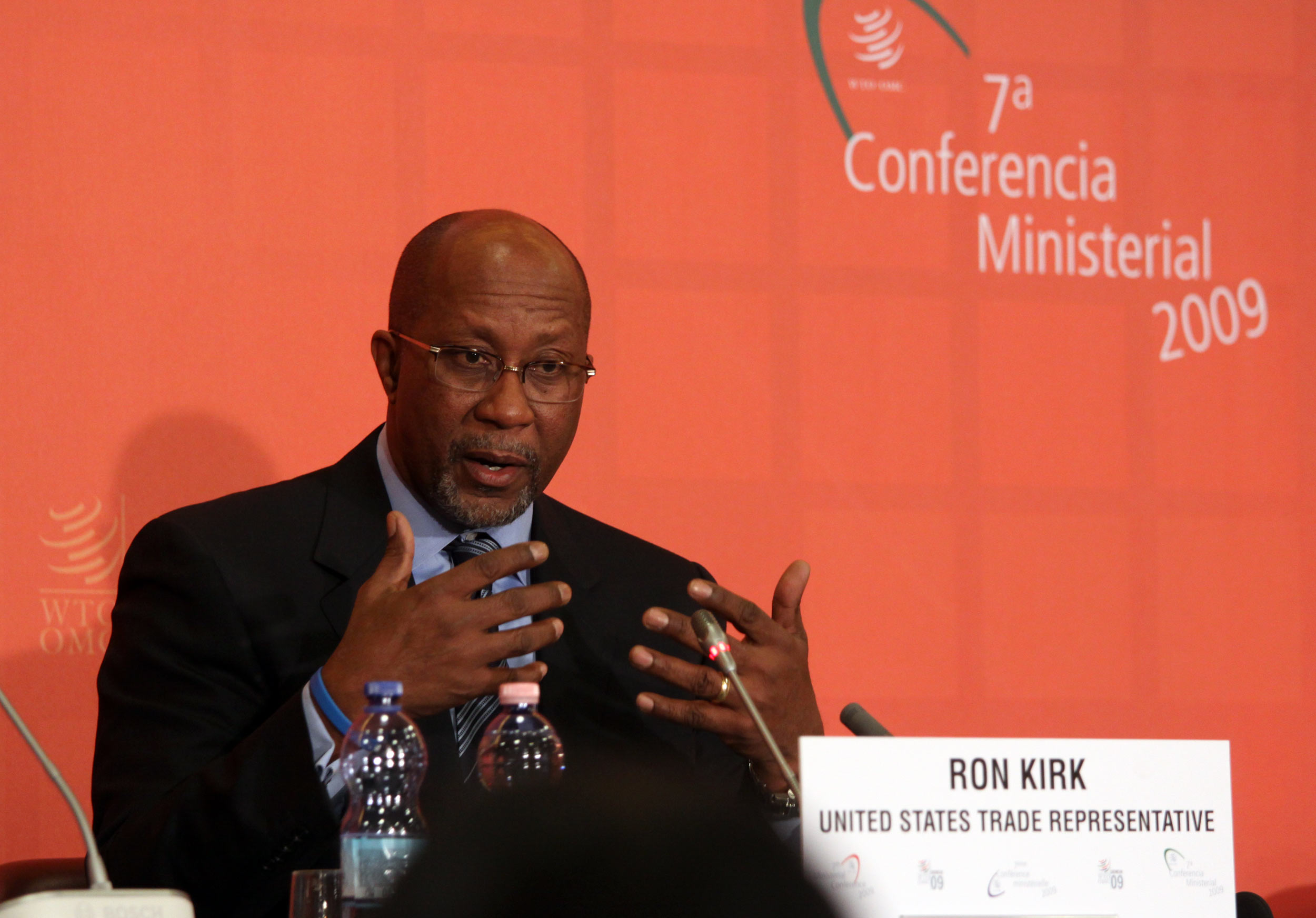
Kirk speaking at a press conference at the end of the 7th WTO Ministerial Conference

As the U.S. Trade Representative, Kirk received the formal title of Ambassador and was a member of the President's Cabinet.

Much of his work, at least as publicly reported, focuses on issues relating to the development and enforcement of intellectual property law in the United States and abroad, especially as they relate to trade policy. This work includes the Anti-Counterfeiting Trade Agreement (ACTA) and Trans-Pacific Partnership (TPP) treaties.

==== China ====
Kirk has repeatedly raised concerns of American businesses that China is not properly enforcing intellectual property rights of American companies doing business there. It has been alleged that the Chinese government takes IT secrets of international companies operating there and passes them on to local companies to boost their competitiveness Kirk has also been critical of China's internet censorship policies, and he is reported to be considering whether to challenge such censorship regulations in the WTO as an unfair barrier to trade; it would be the first case of its kind.

==== ACTA in South Korea ====
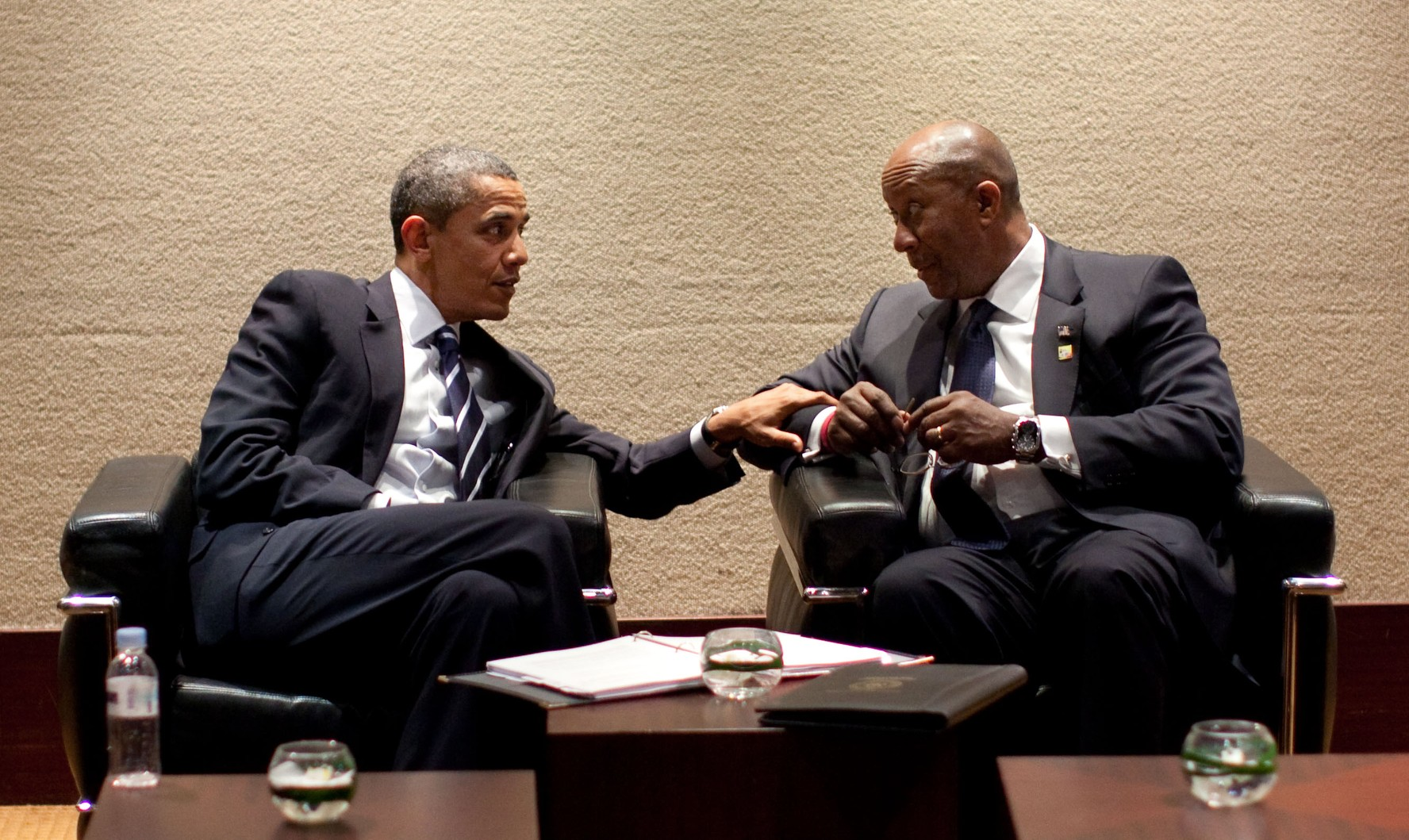
Kirk meeting with President Obama before bilateral meetings in South Korea.

Kirk has been cited as the U.S. agent who convinced South Korea to adopt and enforce an early draft of the secretly negotiated Anti-Counterfeiting Trade Agreement (ACTA). The impacts in South Korea have been dramatic; tens of thousands of citizens have had their websites taken off of the Internet because of copyright infringement.

==== Trans-Pacific Partnership ====
In May 2012, a group of 30 legal scholars, critical of the USTR's "biased and closed" Trans-Pacific Partnership (TPP) treaty negotiation process and proposed intellectual property-related provisions, publicly called upon Kirk to uphold democratic ideals by reversing the "dialing back" of stakeholder participation and to release negotiating texts for public scrutiny. The law professors claimed that leaked documents show that the USTR is "pushing numerous standards that [...] could require changes in current U.S. statutory law" and that the proposal is "manifestly unbalanced—it predominantly proposes increases in proprietor rights, with no effort to expand the limitations and exceptions to such rights that are needed in the U.S. and abroad to serve the public interest". The group claimed that the negotiations excluded stakeholders such as "consumers, libraries, students, health advocacy or patient groups, or others users of intellectual property" and that it only offered "minimal representation of other affected businesses, such as generic drug manufacturers or Internet service providers".

Kirk initially responded that he was "strongly offended by the assertion that our process has been non-transparent and lacked public participation" and that it was actually far more transparent than the negotiations for prior free trade agreements.

This prompted further criticism from the academic group that free-trade agreement negotiations, notorious for their secrecy, are "the wrong standard for assessing the legitimacy of the TPP intellectual property chapter negotiations. This is because the IP chapter in the TPP, like ACTA, is not a trade agreement. It does not adjust tariffs and quotas—it sets new international limits on domestic regulation, regardless of whether such regulation discriminates against, or even affects, trade". The group further reiterated its claim that the secretive process is antithetical to the ideals of democracy, and is "no way to engender trust and faith in international law making with such a broad impact". One critic pointed out that despite Kirk's claim of transparency in the process, public-interest stakeholders have been completely excluded. Another accused Kirk of sidestepping the issue of transparency, and pointed out that transparency is less about the degree of public input, and more about "the flow of information the other way—information about the workings of government being visible to the people it is supposed to represent".

In a subsequent interview with Reuters, Kirk defended the secrecy, saying he believes the USTR has conducted "the most engaged and transparent process as we possibly could", but that "some measure of discretion and confidentiality" are needed "to preserve negotiating strength and to encourage our partners to be willing to put issues on the table they may not otherwise". He dismissed the "tension" as natural and noted that when the Free Trade Area of the Americas drafts were released, negotiators were subsequently unable to reach a final agreement.

On January 22, 2013, Kirk announced that he would be stepping down as the U.S. Trade Representative.

== See also ==
- History of African Americans in Dallas-Fort Worth
- List of African-American United States Senate candidates

Political offices
Preceded by John Hannah	Secretary of State of Texas; 1994–1995	Succeeded by Tony Garza
Preceded by Steve Bartlett	Mayor of Dallas; 1995–2002	Succeeded by Laura Miller
Preceded by Susan Schwab	United States Trade Representative; 2009–2013	Succeeded by Michael Froman
Party political offices
Preceded by Victor Morales	Democratic nominee for U.S. Senator from Texas (Class 2); 2002	Succeeded by Rick Noriega
