= Sport in North Korea =

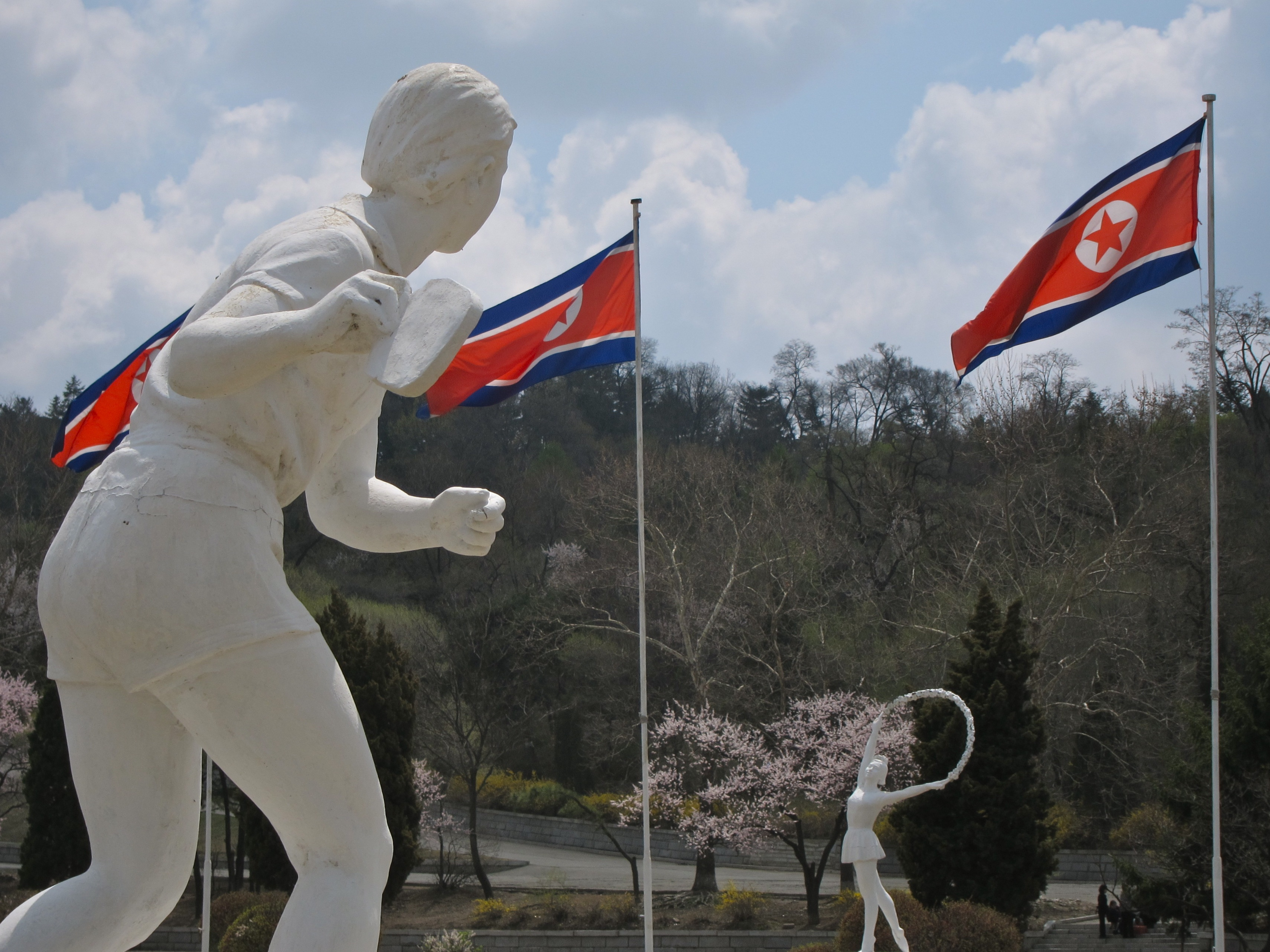
Statue of a table tennis player at Kim Jong-Il Stadium

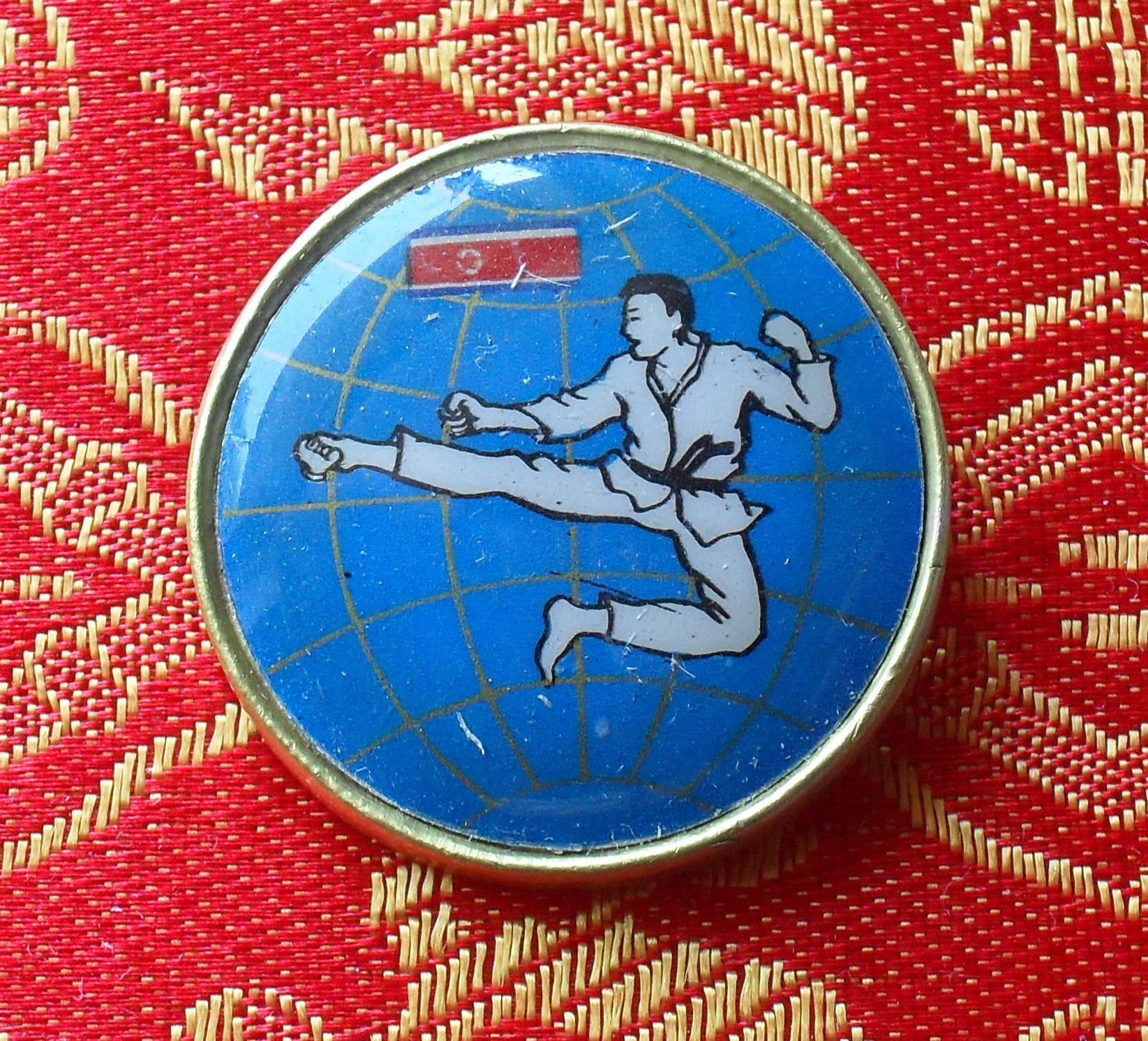
Taekwondo pin from the DPRK

Historically, North Korea's participation in international sporting events has been hindered by the relations with South Korea. Until the 1990s, North Korea used to host up to 14 international events every year, albeit in small scale. Since the early 1990s, the amount was reduced to just one, the Paektusan Prize International Figure Skating Festival. More recently, since the 2000s, North Korea both participates in and hosts more international competitions.

In recent years, however, cooperation in sports has gotten better. Since the early 2000s, North Korean athletes have openly worn sporting equipment with logos of foreign brands on them. In 2017, North Korea complained to various international sporting associations that sanctions against it imposed by the United States prevent it from buying professional sporting equipment.

== Running ==
Marathon running in North Korea began in earnest in 1975 when Choe Chang-sop won the Košice Peace Marathon in Czechoslovakia becoming the greatest athlete in North Korea at the time. The Pyongyang Marathon has been held in April since 1981, with some interruptions. North Korea performs strongly in the women's marathon in international competitions. Jong Song-ok's 1999 gold medal at the women's marathon at the Seville World Championships in Athletics remains the country's only athletics medal at a major competition.

== Football ==
=== 1966 World Cup ===
In 1965, the national football team advanced to the FIFA World Cup held in England. After sixteen teams withdrew from qualifying in the Asian/African Zone, the North Korean team had a two-game series against Australia in Phnom Penh, Cambodia. The North Koreans won both games and qualified for the World Cup.

After losing 3–0 to the Soviet Union, and drawing with Chile, the North Koreans defeated Italy 1–0; the winning goal was scored by Pak Doo-ik.

In the quarterfinal round, the North Koreans faced the Portugal national football team. The North Koreans scored three consecutive goals in the first 24 minutes. Portugal needed a four-goal effort by Eusébio to pull out a 5–3 victory.

=== 2010 World Cup ===
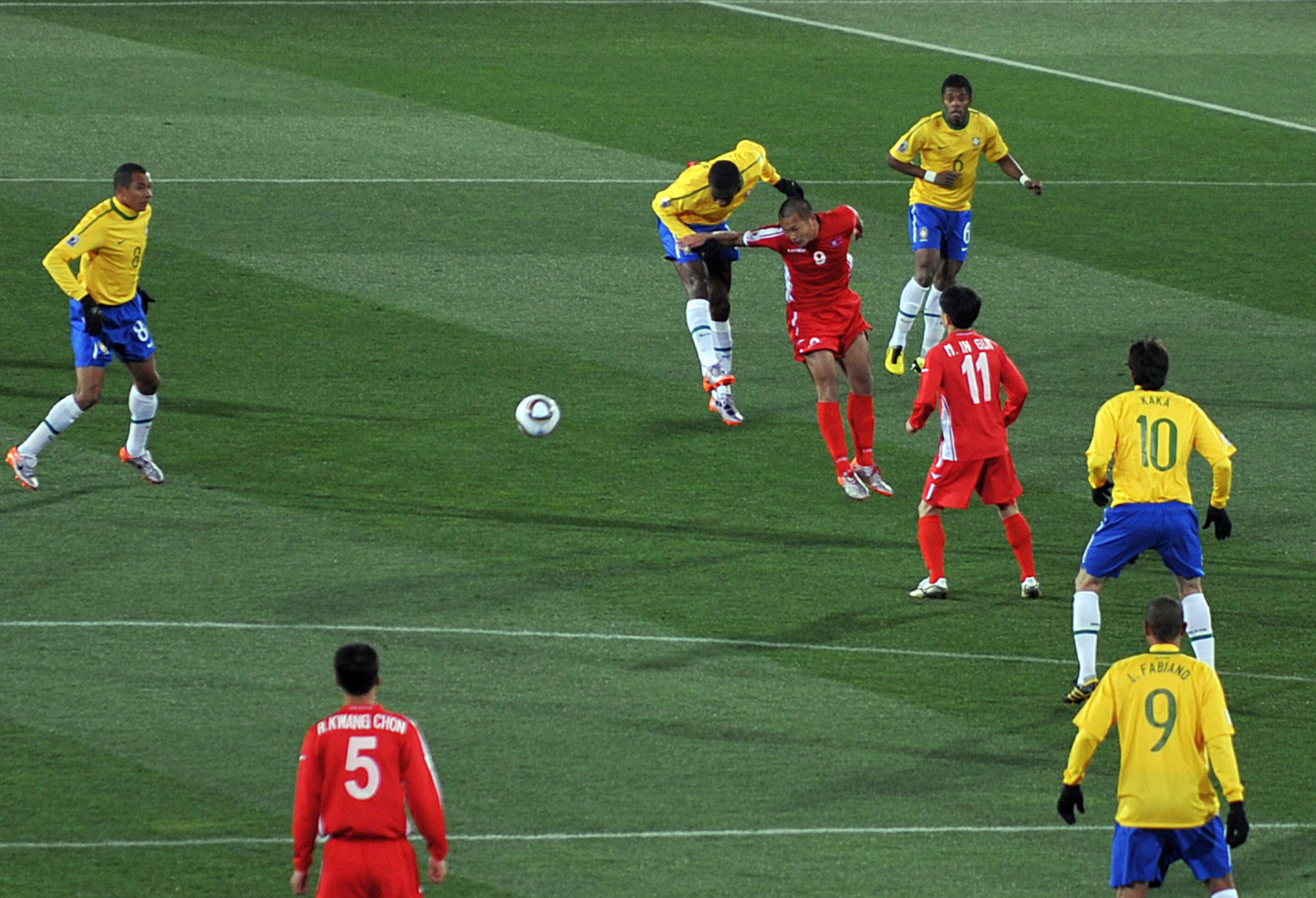
North Korea playing at the 2010 FIFA World Cup

The Chollima (Note: A winged mythical horse that could cover hundreds of kilometers a day and was considered untamable, is also how the DPRK national football team is known.) did not qualify for any further World Cup finals until they advanced to the 2010 FIFA World Cup. Both Koreas qualified for the 2010 finals. Based on the group stage draw, the two Korean sides would not have been able to meet until at least the semi-finals of the knockout stage. The North Korean team failed to get past the group stage, finishing bottom of the group and losing all three matches.

=== Domestic football ===
North Korea has domestic leagues for both men and women, and all games take place at Kim Jong-Il Stadium in Pyongyang. Traditionally major teams in the men's league include April 25, Pyongyang City, and Rimyongsu Sports Club.

In September 2010, the first official friendly match between a domestic football team and a foreign club took place in the Kim Il-sung Stadium, featuring the German All Stars, an expatriate team from Singapore. The North Korean team won the two consecutive days matches (1–0 and 4–2).

In 2018, the German All Stars returned to Pyongyang, taking part in 2 friendlies against DPRK Premier League team Hwaebul Sports Club. After a 7–0 loss in the first game, GAS stepped into the Kim Il Sung Stadium, losing 4–2. Thomas Nock scored the first goal for the German side, before Fraser Tyler became the first Englishman to score in the DPRK, with a strike from the left side of the area. Despite 2 defeats in under a week, the Germans defeated Hwaebul in a penalty shootout by 7 goals to 6.

=== Women's football ===
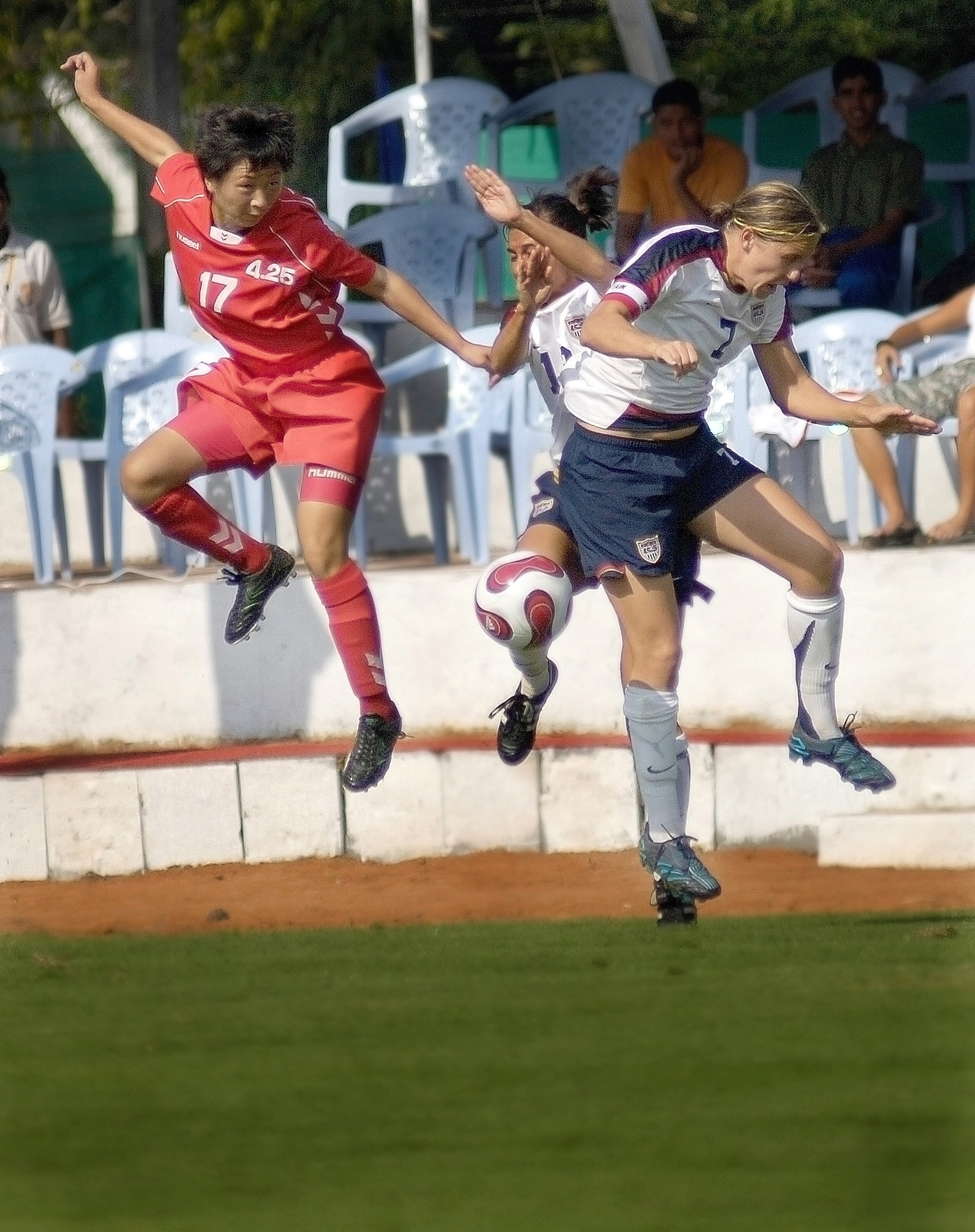
Jang Il-ok competing for the ball

Since 1993, the women's football team has seen more success on the international stage than the men's side, qualifying for the 1999, 2003, 2007 and 2011 FIFA Women's World Cup. In 1999, the team defeated Denmark during the group stage, and in 2003 defeated African champion Nigeria. The women's team has established itself as one of the strongest in Asia, winning the 2001 and 2003 AFC Women's Asian Cups after finishing as the runner-up in 1993 and 1997.

In September 2010, the Middlesbrough Ladies football team toured the country for a series of friendlies. They played two matches, unaware that they would be playing professional sides. They played April 25 Sports Club, losing 6–2, and Kalmaegi, losing 5–0. The visit gave Middlesbrough their largest ever attendance, with both matches attracting 6,000 people each, beating the previous record of 1,000 when they played Arsenal Ladies.

Women's football team qualified for the 2027 FIFA Women's World Cup after defeating Chinese Taipei 4–0 in the AFC Women's Asian Cup playoffs, marking their first appearance since 2011. The return follows a long absence due to doping sanctions and missed tournaments in 2014, 2018, and 2022.

== Basketball ==
North Korea is also active in basketball, with a national team that represents the nation in international competitions.

The current and previous leaders of DPR Korea were known for their fondness of basketball. Kim Jong-Il was said to have a video library of every game Michael Jordan played, and was presented with a ball signed by Jordan by Madeleine Albright in 2000. The following year, Jordan was formally invited to visit North Korea, which he declined.

In December 2013, former American basketball professional Dennis Rodman visited North Korea to help train the national team after he developed a friendship with Chairman Kim Jong-un during his first visit to the country in February 2013. Kim has met with the five-time NBA champion and Hall of Famer several times.

== Winter sports ==
Short track speed skating and figure skating are winter sports that North Korea performs well in. Performance in the Winter Olympics has however remained modest, which is described as "surprising" given the mountainous geography of North Korea.

The Paektusan Prize International Figure Skating Festival is hosted annually, a practice that continued even through the 1990s when hosting all other international sporting events was suspended.

=== Ice hockey ===
Hockey was introduced to North Korea by visiting Soviet and Chinese workers in the 1950s. Since then, North Koreans have competed in international events. Hockey is a popular pastime in the country.

Success of the North Korean national ice hockey teams has been limited. North Korea has a men's team that is ranked 45th out of 49 in the IIHF. A domestic ice hockey league began operations in 1955, the same year the Ice Hockey Association of the DPR Korea was founded. Clubs are based in such cities as Pyongyang, Kaesong, Kanggye and Nampho.

The women's team is ranked 26 out of 34 and competes in Division II.

== Golf ==
North Korea has one golf course in use: the Pyongyang Golf Complex. The course is 18 holes and 20 miles from Pyongyang. In 2011 the first DPRK Amateur Golf Open took place and is now an annual event, open to nationalities from all around the world.

== Gymnastics ==
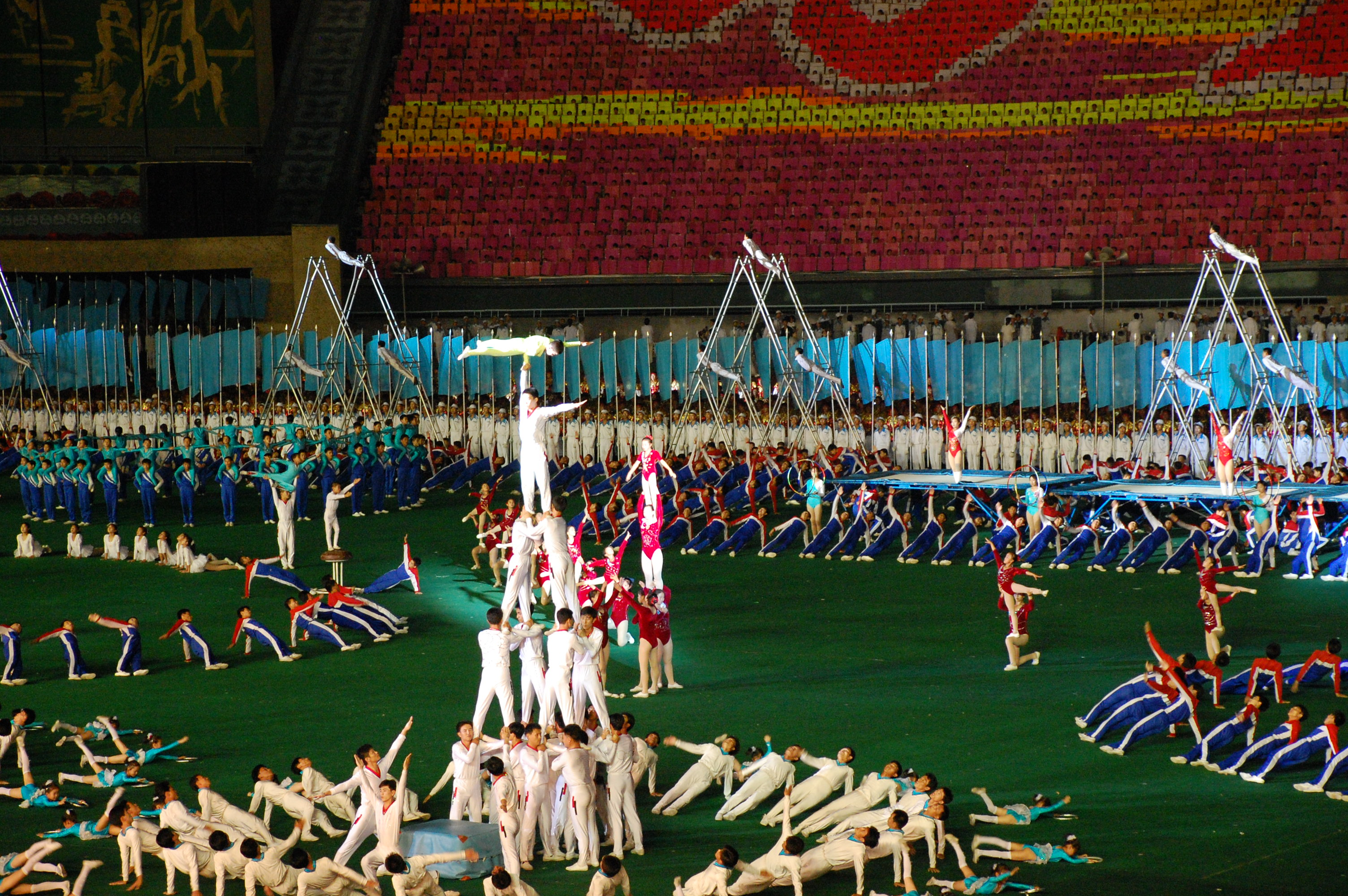
Arirang Festival in 2007

The Grand Mass Gymnastics and Artistic Performance Arirang (Chosŏn'gŭl: 아리랑 축제, Hancha: 아리랑 祝祭), also known as the Arirang Mass Games, or the Arirang Festival is a mass gymnastics and artistic festival held in the Rungrado May Day Stadium in Pyongyang, North Korea. The games usually take place in August and/or September.

== Taekwondo ==
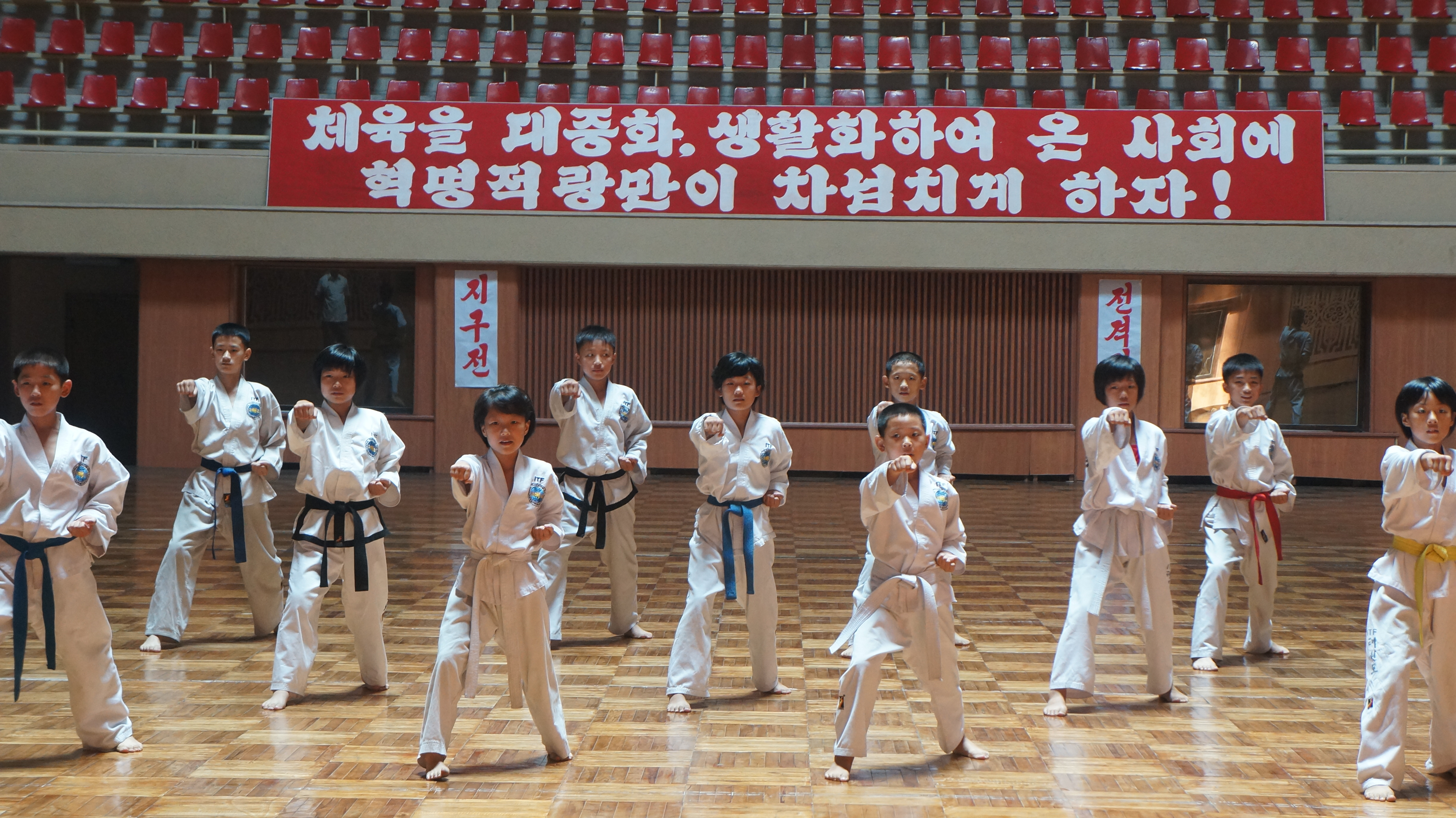
North Korean Children practice taekwondo

International Taekwondo Federation's 20th world championship was held in Pyongyang in 2017.

== Professional wrestling ==
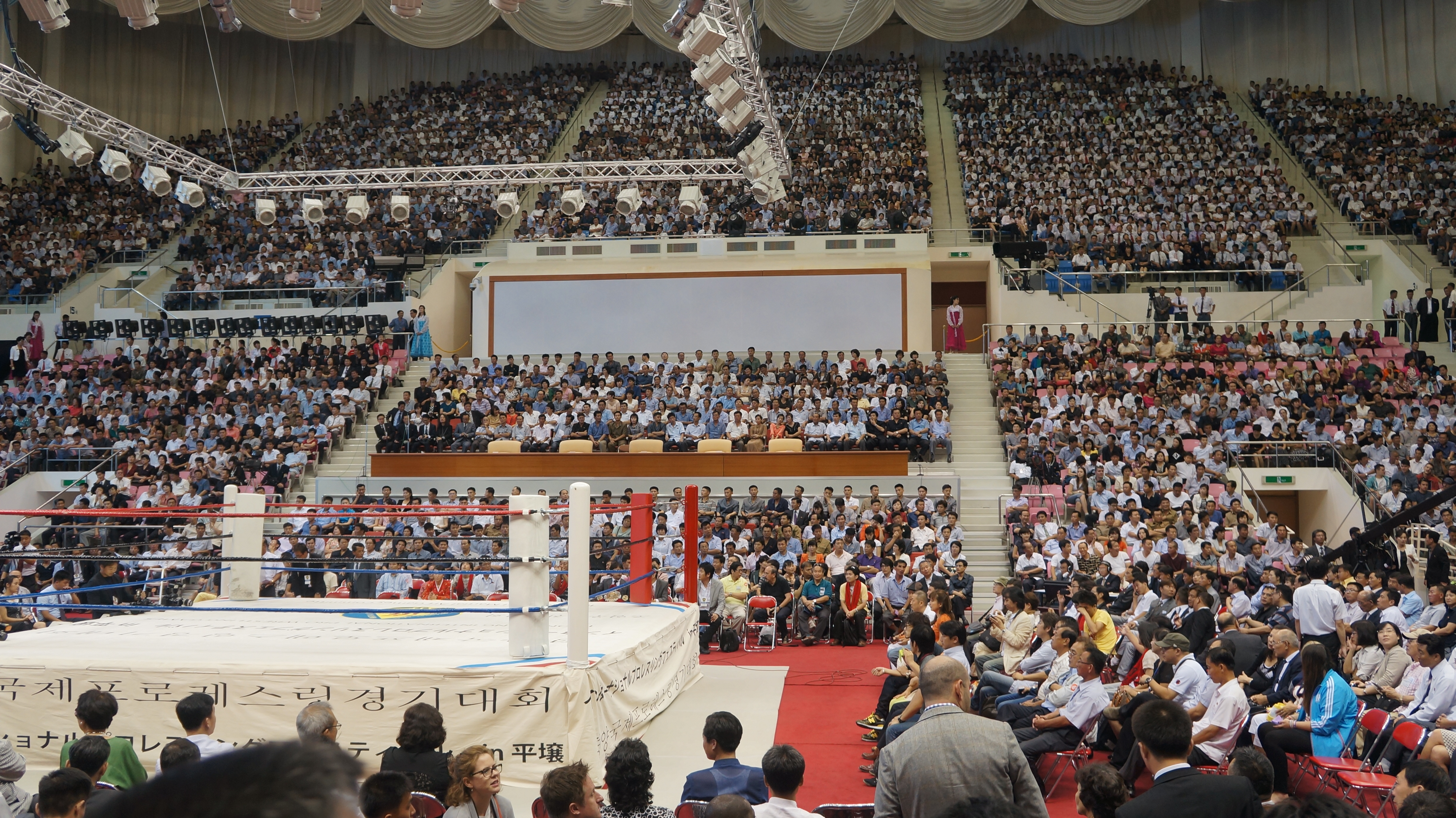
A stadium is filled for pro-wrestling friendship games.

In 1995, a crew from defunct American professional wrestling promotion World Championship Wrestling and the Japanese professional wrestling promotion New Japan Pro-Wrestling, led by company Executive Producer Eric Bischoff and former World Champion Ric Flair among others, flew to Pyongyang via China to participate in an "International Peace Festival" co-organised by North Korea and Japanese politician Antonio Inoki, himself a former professional wrestling icon. Over the course of two days, WCW played to an audience of 340,000, at Pyongyang May Day stadium, the largest ever audience for a professional wrestling show, with a main event on the final night of Inoki vs. Flair, with a guest appearance by boxing icon Muhammad Ali.

Matches from the two shows, as well as footage from inside Pyongyang and a mass gymnastic display, were released on pay-per-view and VHS some 17 months after the event, entitled Collision in Korea, and though the PPV performed dismally, pulling a 0.15, the VHS release has become something of a cult hit among longtime wrestling fans and North Korean culture enthusiasts, the atmosphere of the show being so radically different from American wrestling's usual bombast and pageantry.

== Baseball ==
The North Korea national baseball team is the national baseball team of North Korea. The team represents North Korea in international competitions. The team is organized by the Baseball and Softball Association of DPR Korea.

== North Korea at the Olympics ==
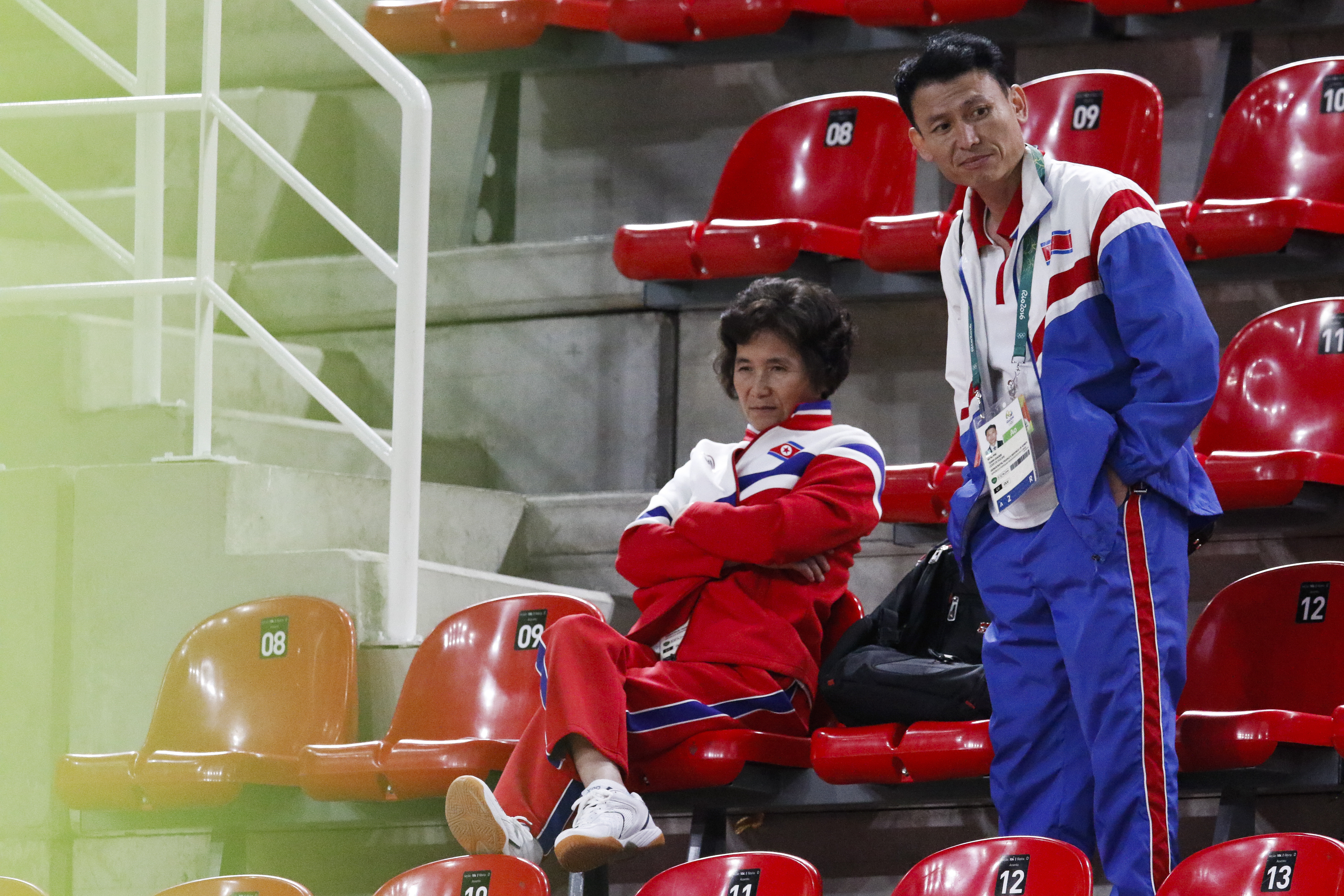
North Koreans observe a training session for gymnastics at the 2016 Summer Olympics.

North Korea's first Summer Olympics appearance on its own was in the 1972 Summer Olympics in Munich, West Germany, taking home five medals, including one gold. Four years later, in Montreal, the nation took one gold and one silver in boxing, and four years after that it earned five medals in boxing, freestyle wrestling, and weightlifting in Moscow. In 1984, the nation joined the Eastern bloc boycott of the Los Angeles Games, and four years later, boycotted the Games held in Seoul due to the South's unwillingness to co-host the event with the North. Despite a mostly unified Communist boycott in 1984, Cuba, Ethiopia, Madagascar, Nicaragua, and Seychelles joined the North Korean boycott in 1988.

The nation returned to Olympic competition in 1992 at the Barcelona Games, winning an unprecedented nine medals in Spain, four of them gold.

At the Sydney Games in 2000, and in Athens four years later, the North and South marched together in the opening and closing ceremonies under the Unification Flag, but competed separately. North Korea has medaled in every Summer Olympics they have participated in.

North Korean athletes have competed in several Winter Olympics competitions as well, first competing at the 1964 Winter Olympics in Innsbruck. Han Pil-Hwa took silver medal in the women's 3000 meters of speed skating at the game. Another North Korean Winter Olympic medal was a bronze in 1992 at the Albertville Games when Hwang Ok-Sil took third place in the women's 500 meters of short track speed skating. The North and South again marched under the Unification Flag at the Turin Games in 2006.

In October 2013, Kim Jong-un introduced a new policy that allows successful athletes to receive luxury apartments in recognition for their achievements. The reward was given to Om Yun-chol, An Kum-ae and Kim Un-guk, who earned Olympic medals at the 2012 Summer Olympics.

== North Korea at the Asian Games ==
North Korea has competed at the Asian Games since 1974. It ranked at the top five in 1974, 1978, 1982, and 1990. In 2018, athletes from North and South combined to claim the first gold medal for a unified Korea at the Asian Games in a women's canoe race.

== North Korean sport in cinema ==
Two English language documentaries have been created by British filmmaker Daniel Gordon involving North Korean sport.

The 2002 film The Game of Their Lives details the seven surviving members of the 1966 World Cup team.

The 2004 film A State of Mind follows two child gymnasts and their families as they prepare for the 2003 Arirang Festival.

The 2012 film As One (Korean: 코리아; RR: Koria; lit. "Korea") is a cinematic retelling of the first ever post-war Unified Korea sports team which won the gold at the 1991 World Table Tennis Championships in Chiba, Japan, with actress Bae Doona playing North Korea's Ri Bun-hui.

== See also ==
- Traditional games of Korea
- Sport in South Korea
