= Jangmadang =

Markets in North Korea

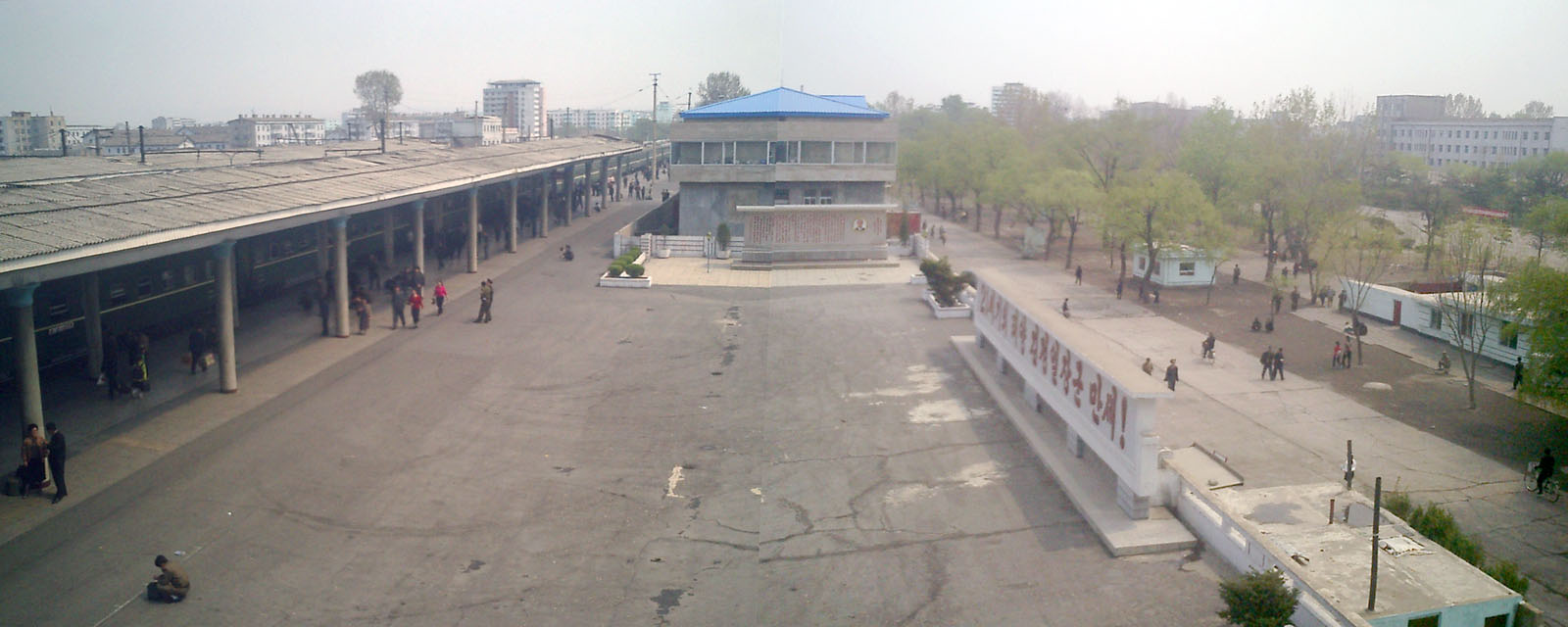
Sinuiju is a major hub for North Korean formal and informal economy due to its proximity to the Chinese border. The Sinuiju railway station is portrayed here.

Jangmadang (lit. 'market grounds'; Korean: 장마당; Hanja: 場마당; IPA: [t͡ɕa̠ŋma̠da̠ŋ]) are North Korean local markets, farmers' markets, black markets and bazaars. Since the North Korean famine in the 1990s, they have formed a large informal economy, and the government has become more lenient towards them. However, merchants still face heavy regulations. A majority of North Koreans have become dependent on jangmadang for their survival.

The North Korean government has tried to regulate the growth of the market economy in North Korea using a variety of methods. Some of them, such as regulating the age of traders, has resulted in societal changes such as making women more responsible for earning money for their families.

There have been speculations on the possible role of black markets in reforming the North Korean government and its economy, as has happened in China.

In 2019, the authorities moved to curb individual economic activity, followed by greater crackdowns in 2021, creating a decline in markets.

== Background ==
North Korea established a socialist welfare system in 1948, with the Constitution of the Democratic People's Republic of Korea. This system nationalized the means of production and the population received goods, food, and other necessities through a public distribution system. As a result of the 1994–1998 famine, also known as the Arduous March or the March of Suffering, the distribution of rations was reduced drastically. Citizens were forced to secure food and other necessities through different means. North Korean citizens farmed land deemed "unusable for agricultural purposes" by the government or even small kitchen gardens to provide for their families. These illegal private farms were able to produce crop yields larger than the public agriculture programs. Farmers sold off any surplus of goods or bartered for other necessities.

After the collapse of the public distribution system in North Korea, the North Korean government had no choice but to tolerate private markets. They originally sold essential items, rice and vegetables. Private markets evolved from local communities involving various organizations, workplaces, relatives and neighbors, that helped people to survive during the famine. Many of these mutual-help arrangements broke up later on, as markets developed.

Unlike in cities, the people use bartering instead of money to engage in trade.

China dominates both the official and unofficial economies in North Korea. Some people received their start-up capital from relatives in China. Many of these relatives also became partners and advisers in business.

== Overview ==
=== As a source of livelihood ===
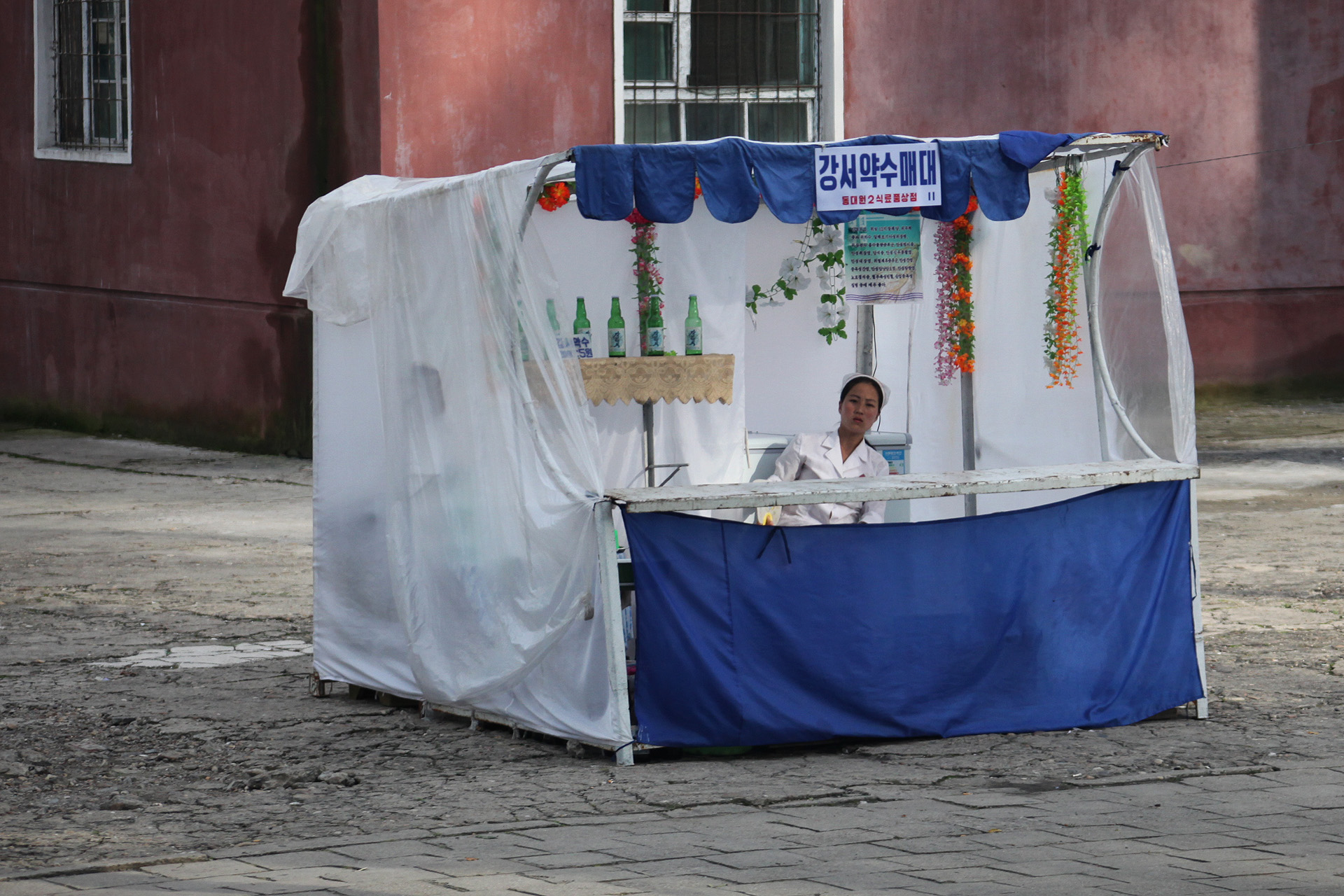
A North Korean vendor on a makeshift market stand selling goods.

As of 2008, an estimate of 70 percent of households living in cities engage in handicrafts, trade or transportation services related to trade. Without a working food distribution system, people need local markets to earn money and survive. While actual monthly salary was two U.S. dollars, an average North Korean earned a total of around 15 dollars a month in 2011. Successful black-market operators and actual capitalistic success stories are rare, however, even if a few former laborers and farmers have become very rich with income of hundreds and even thousands of dollars a month. Between a half and three-quarters of North Korean people's income come from various market activities. However, crackdowns by government lead to irregularities in business and bribing.

Annual studies conducted among defectors by the Seoul National University Institute for Peace and Unification Studies revealed, even if the studies may be misrepresentative of the whole population, that little more than half of them received money from the North Korean state. A significant growth of number of the people engaged in private business activities and related bribing was also noted.

A study conducted by the Center for Strategic and International Studies found at least 436 officially sanctioned markets across the country in 2018. These markets generate an estimated number of $56.8 million annually in taxes and rent, and have become a larger part of the nation's economy than even the government would like to admit. In fact, they often propagandize against the privatization of business and boast of their own self-reliance.

Kookmin University professor Andrei Lankov reports that some Jangmadang merchants, in addition to the elite and foreign currency earners, have paid for private education of their children. Music, computers and foreign languages have been the most popular courses among the private courses. In North Korea, the songbun system heavily regulates access to public education, and people with a modest background have a difficult time to get into universities such as Kim Il Sung University. Andrei Lankov, however, welcomed a crackdown of the private education by North Korean officials, despite having doubts about corruption and competitiveness of the public education in North Korea.

In 2017, the Korea Institute for National Unification estimated there were 440 government-approved markets employing about 1.1 million people. A subsequent survey by AccessDPRK, completed in 2022, found that there were at least 477 markets in the country, with 39 new markets constructed since 2011. However, the expansion of vendor stall space declined from 23,000 sq. meters of additional space in 2019 to just 630 sq. meters of additional space in 2021, reflecting the impact of the COVID-19 pandemic on the country's economy.

=== Food security ===
North Korea suffered from a famine from 1994 to 1999, which killed between two and three million people from starvation and other hunger-related illnesses.

The traders smuggle food across the border from China to North Korea for sale.

Usually crops are the cheapest right after harvest season. In addition to the typical seasonal changes in the prices of crops, droughts in North Korea may cause severe increase in prices of foodstuffs, and harm people's ability to keep a balanced and nutritious diet. In 2015, the drought tripled the price of potatoes compared to same time in 2014. Rumors of a bad potato harvest coming also caused increase in prices.

North Koreans who engage in various kinds of household business also farm private land. The poorest North Koreans, without the ability to start a food stall, usually live through subsistence farming. A significant portion of the North Korean food supply is produced illegally and privately, on small farm plots known as sotoji (small land).

=== Goods and services offered ===
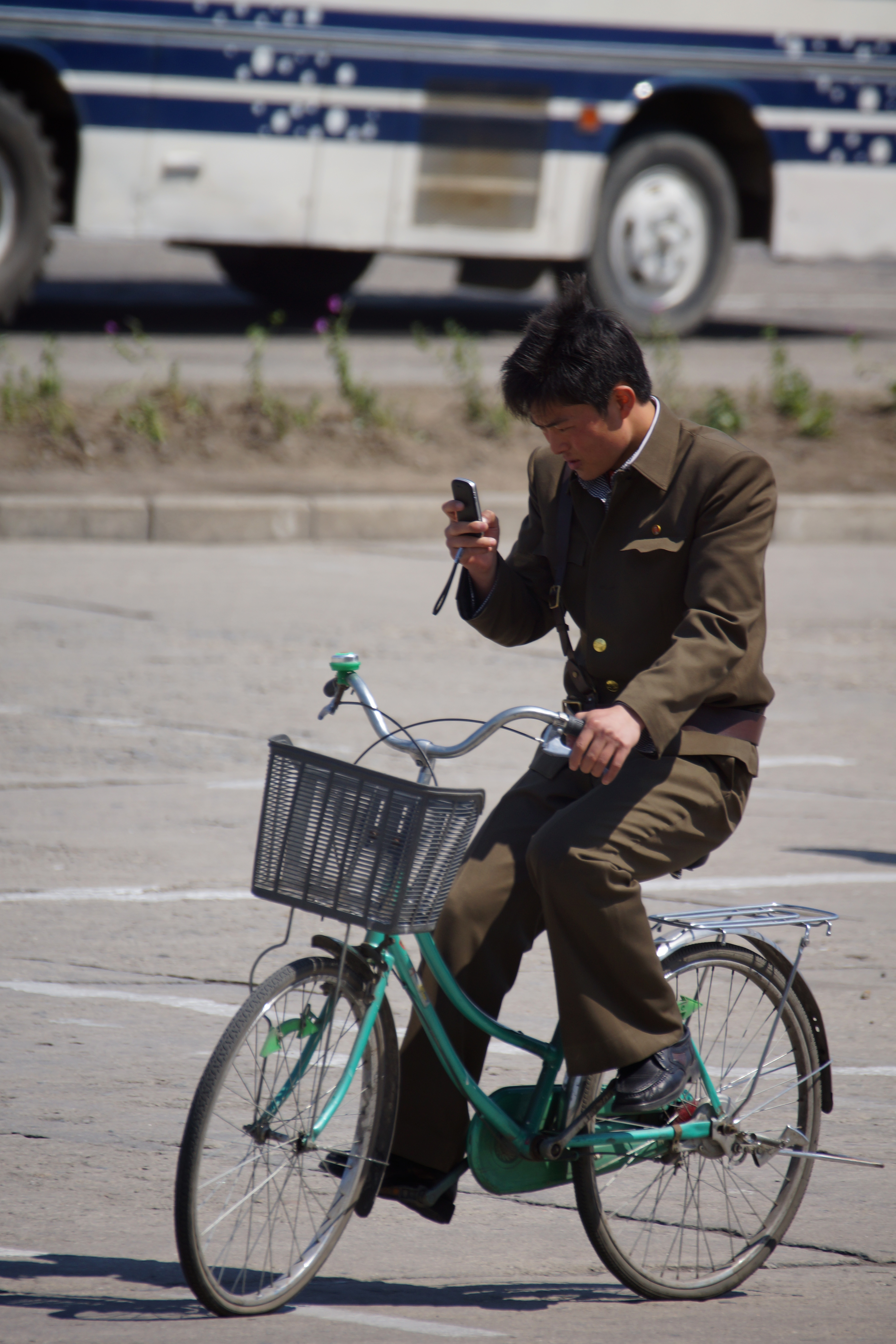
Bicycles and mobile phones are becoming more prevalent in North Korea.

Even if living conditions have not improved much in North Korea, the market activity and range of goods have had an increase. The quality of the goods has also increased.

In 2008, among the most popular or wanted goods sold at markets were street food, car batteries, rice cookers, electric shavers, dress shoes, cosmetics, DVD-players, motorcycles and vinyl floor coverings. Many of the brand labels on goods for sale are fake, and pretend to be South Korean made goods.

Cannabis may or may not be legal in North Korea. There is a report of it being sold in Rason market.

Livestock stalls are a recent addition with markets in large cities being transformed into agricultural markets.

Money lending and foreign currency exchange have appeared with growth of the markets. As banks do not really function in North Korea, but in name, the market stalls are used as the main platform for banking transactions. Many people use foreign currency for their savings and those selling more valuable goods often use Chinese yuan. Taking a loan, to buy expensive goods such as bicycles, has become more common.

Even private medical services have appeared in the markets with retired doctors offering their services, and with self-trained traditional Korean medicine practicers present too. The doctors charge around 10 dollars for a diagnosis, and some doctors fill in prescriptions for people. Many of these doctors had been unable to live on their wages. Black market medical services have been around since the free health care system collapsed in the 1990s. Some officials have themselves been forced to receive help from the same doctors they are supposed to crackdown.

== Role in possible reforms ==
One defector reportedly displayed surprise on the similarity between markets in North Korea and South Korea, instead of the contrasts.

Some have talked about Jangmadang Generation while referring to the people born in the 1980s and 1990s.

Kim Jong Un has been speculated to want more liberal marketplaces than Kim Jong Il. However, as market trade has increased, support for Kim Jong Un among the people has not notably weakened, which casts into doubt the claim that market reforms would dwindle support for the regime.

=== Access to outside information ===
With the rise of jangmadang, trade of foreign goods in North Korea has increased substantially, making foreign media more accessible than it was in the years prior to the famine. DVDs and memory sticks containing South Korean films and television shows have become relatively commonplace, as have radios capable of receiving transmissions from Chinese stations.

These goods have provided new avenues for outside information to reach North Koreans, and former North Korean government official Jang Jin-sung believes the continued availability of such information in jangmadang could play a critical role in the reform or outright dissolution of the Kim regime.

== Suppression and regulation by North Korean government ==
Some people sell their wares in alleyways near the actual marketplace to avoid harassment and extortion by officials of the Ministry of Social Security. These merchants are called, for their rapid proliferation, "tick merchants" in North Korea. They are also sometimes referred to as "grasshopper merchants".

Around 2007, the officials tried to take control of sales of the Chinese-made plastic floor coverings, which had become popular and profitable with increasing living standards, by decreeing that they may be sold only through state-owned stores. The officials also tried to regulate private buses and trucks exceeding the weight limit of eight tons, and tried to register the violators as state employees and declare the vehicles as state property. This wholesale business with trucks is known as Chapan-Jangsa in North Korea. These two economic activities were among the three most profitable businesses in addition to methamphetamine sales.

In 2013, an identity-based vendor system was started to stop people from avoiding stall rental fees. They now have to hold a vendor card around the neck during business hours. These vendor cards can be used to check if a merchant has paid the stall fees and to verify their identity. Vendors have also been made to rotate their stall locations.

Some well-to-do merchants are allowed to skip the mobilizations by flexible local units. People with good songbun (family background) are also allowed more excuses for being absent.

=== Age and gender regulation ===
In 2008, women younger than 40 years old were banned from doing business in markets.

However, under the rule of Kim Jong Un, the age limits have been removed from women, even though they have been raised for men. Currently only men over 60 are allowed to work on markets. This is an attempt to enforce loyalty of the workers to their workplaces, according to a Daily NK source from Ryanggang Province.

=== Currency reforms ===
These grey markets have seen an influx of foreign currencies, mainly the Chinese Yuan and the United States dollar. The Chinese Yuan has become generally accepted tender in most of these markets and the dollar can be seen in newer digitalized businesses. This caused dramatic changes in the valuation of the North Korean won, which the government tried to correct in 2009. One theory of North Korean government's goals in the 2009 revaluation of the Won, is that it targeted those traders who had developed large surpluses of capital. The currency reform also caused an initial flurry of buying in jangmadangs by worried people to make sure their savings did not lose all of their value. Ultimately, the currency reform failed as official and black-market exchange rates for the North Korean Won continued to depreciate. This caused a second attempt at reform in 2012, which cause further depreciation before leveling off around 8,000 North Korean won per United States dollar. For some time, only the Chinese Yuan, in addition to other foreign currencies, was practically accepted in trade, with the exception of food merchants selling rice. Eventually the new won stabilized near the pre-currency reform value, after suffering a period of hyperinflation.

=== 2020s crackdowns ===
During the COVID-19 pandemic in North Korea, the state ramped up border patrols. Officials also began imposing tougher punishments for distributing black market imported products, with new laws forbidding dealing in goods that merchants did not produce themselves, and more state control over the markets.

With the recovery of North Korea's economy in the 2020s, the North Korean government asserted tighter control over the markets, including by demanding state-manufactured goods appear on shelves and expanding surveillance. State-run shops and pharmacies and shops were expanded to replace the black markets, while new factories in rural areas were built to produce jobs for traders who previously engaged in smuggling.

== Changing gender roles in North Korean society ==
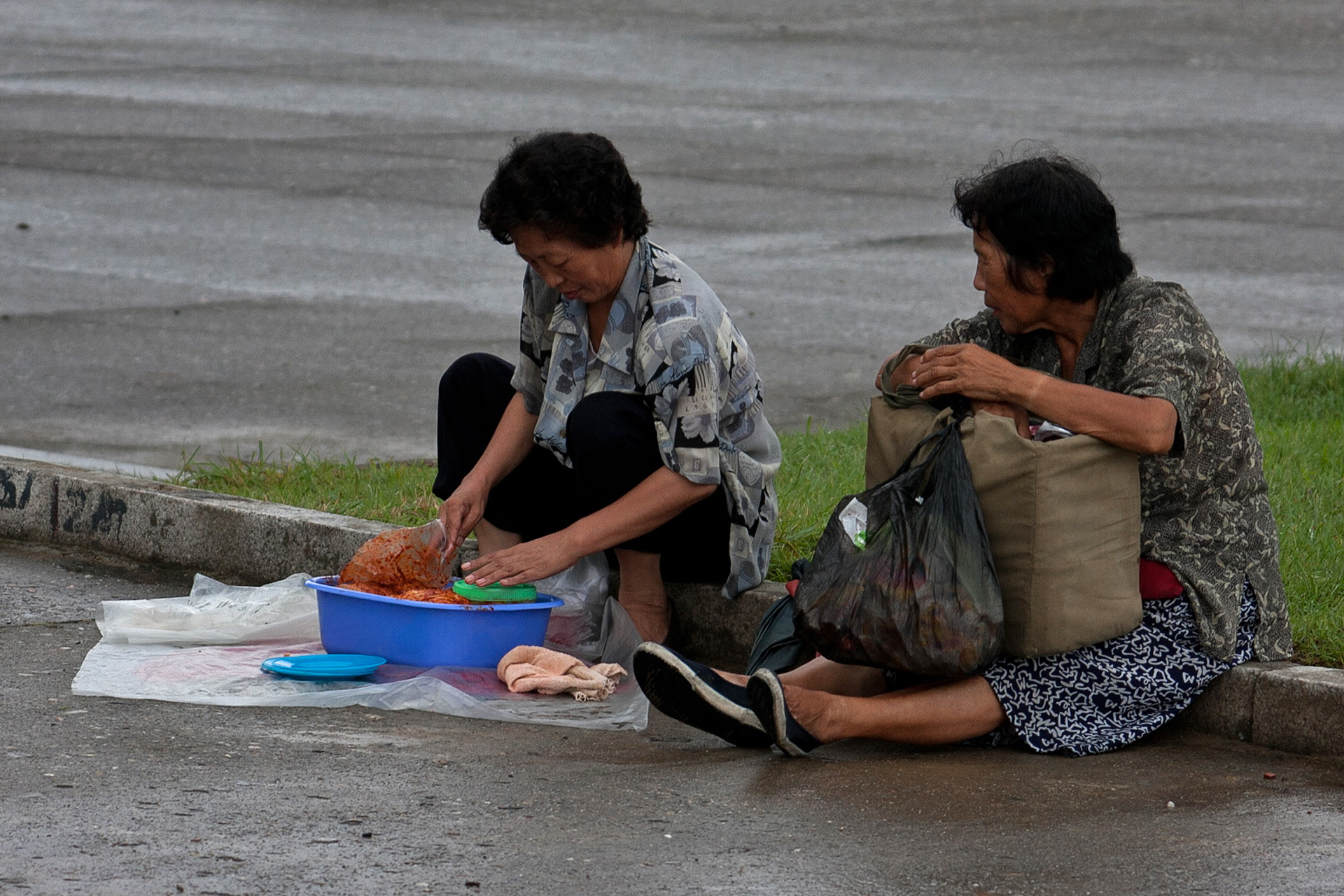
Two elderly North Korean women sitting on a street. One of them is preparing food.

During the North Korean famine, people received and shared help first in their local community through organizations, workplaces, relatives and neighbors. These networks for assistance and barter were based on existing solidarity and trust. It has been reported that even women's organizations, such as elderly women's association, were able to give help. The initial barter networks developed into early makeshift marketplaces. However, many of the originally existing mutual-help relations strained and broke up later on.

Married women and elderly women with married children and grandchildren, played the most active role in the early mutual-help arrangements and the birth of marketplaces. North Korea human rights reporter Barbara Demick called these women "mothers of invention". These women were the ones to take risk of traveling great distances, and going to find food from countryside, or even from other provinces despite regulations against human mobility. The local administration in provinces which had suffered food shortages in the 1980s, was tolerant on the actions people took to survive. These women also defied regulations against unauthorized goods transactions, and some crossed the dangerous border to China as temporary migrants, to take the role of family's breadwinner.

Historically in North Korea the man has been seen as a head of the family, and provider for family's livelihood, but with collapse of the North Korean economy, the men have been forced to stay in their workplaces even if they can not work in a non-functioning factory. As it has become impossible to live with monthly salary anymore, the role of the provider has increasingly fallen for women to do. A married woman can be registered as a full-time housewife giving freedom to trade. Men have to pay factory management for the same unofficial privilege. However, women's relative freedom has allowed some men to stay in market life to earn money. As men take care of the wholesale and transportation, the women take care of the actual selling of the goods on marketplaces. According to Andrei Lankov, remarkably the women dominate North Korean economy on the lower levels. The women engage not only in trade, but on small scale household production making shoes, sewing garments and preparing food for sale.

== See also ==
- Economy of North Korea
- Illicit activities of North Korea
- Informal economy of China
- North Korean studies
- Notel, a very popular Chinese media player in North Korea
- Poverty in North Korea
- Second economy of the Soviet Union
- Shibuya incident
- Telecommunications in North Korea
