= Poverty in Korea =

Poverty in Korea can refer to:

- Poverty in South Korea
- Poverty in North Korea
