= Media of Korea =

Media of Korea may refer to:

- Mass media in North Korea
  - Media coverage of North Korea
- Mass media in South Korea
