= Media coverage of North Korea =

Media coverage of North Korea (officially known as the Democratic People's Republic of Korea) is hampered by an extreme lack of reliable information, coupled with an abundance of sensationalist falsehoods. There are various reasons for this lack of information and inaccurate stories.

Access to North Korea by foreign news media is severely restricted by the North Korean government. There are very few full-time correspondents in the country. In the absence of on-the-spot reportage, a key source of information about North Korea is the testimony of defectors, but they are not necessarily reliable for several reasons. Overall, much information about North Korea is filtered through South Korea, and the longstanding conflict between the two states distorts the information that is received.

Despite North Korea being a "black box" to outsiders, strong interest in the Kim family, as well as misunderstandings of Korean culture, have also led to inaccurate reporting. In the absence of solid evidence, some media outlets turn to sensationalism, basing stories on rumors. Stereotypes, exaggerations, or caricaturing distort some media coverage of North Korea. There has been some media coverage based on hoaxes or satire. There have even been cases of publication of contradictory stories based on hearsay and rumour, on the sole basis that these stories affirm prior skewed impressions of the country.

== Overall assessments ==
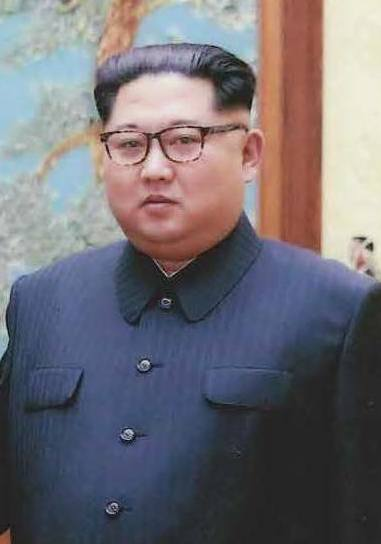
In August 2020 multiple tabloid newspapers incorrectly headlined that Supreme Leader Kim Jong Un was dead or in a coma based on comments by a South Korean ex-diplomat.

In 2014, Tania Branigan, a correspondent for The Guardian, said that there "are few other international topics on which so much is published with so little relation to or even care for the truth" by media outlets "with all sorts of standpoints and of widely varying quality". Branigan offers several reasons why this is the case. First, because North Korea stories attract many readers, editors and reporters may have an "overwhelming" temptation to run even suspect stories. Second, journalists have severely limited sources in North Korea: "We can't pick up the phone and ask Pyongyang for comment, then call some North Korean farmers to see if they agree. Even if we call an expert, they will often be hypothesizing.... At the worst, we may only be able to find out whether it is plausible or not. The demands of rolling news contribute to this because we now have a system where people are producing stories much faster. In many cases, sites are doing little or no original reporting but aggregating and sending on. Mistakes get replicated, even expanded". Third, relatively few journalists speak Korean. Fourth, because North Korea is an isolated society, "stories may be too hard to disprove: The difficulties of accessing information also mean it is impossible for anyone to flat out refute many stories about North Korea. So a website or television station may run a highly questionable piece but even if they are challenged on it, it's hard to demonstrate that they are indisputably wrong". Finally, "North Korea is simply so bizarre and unlikely in many regards that it often seems anything is possible there".

In 2015, filmmaker Anna Broinowski wrote, "If any country proves sensationalism beats truth in the social media economy, it's North Korea".

In 2022, David Tizzard wrote in NK News that, "It's certainly true that some media use exaggerated and orientalist language in their reporting on life in the DPRK. Many will have seen the sensationalist stories about death by dogs, 11 holes-in-one and so on. Such reporting is incredibly problematic and is not just restricted to tabloids and fringe websites. But there is also a great deal of accurate, informed and balanced coverage of North Korea. In fact, it could be reasonably argued that the country has never been understood better."

== Lack of reliable information ==
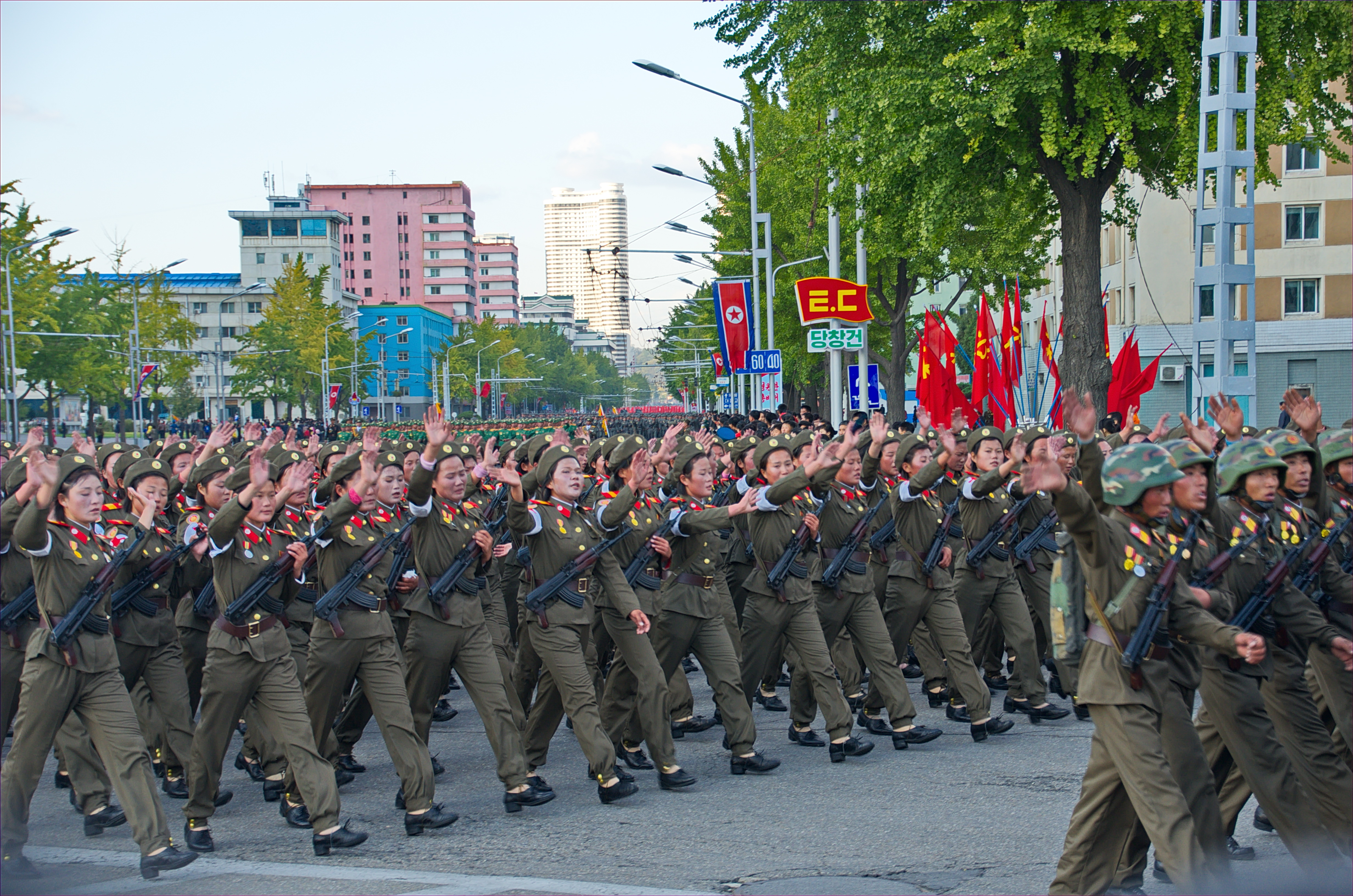
Media coverage of North Korea often features military parades

Media coverage is hampered by a lack of reliable information. The verification of facts is notoriously difficult. For example, researcher Christopher Green has described trying to confirm a story about Vice Marshal Ri Yong-ho being killed in a firefight in Pyongyang in 2012, but being unable to find a source there that knew about it. Even intelligence agencies struggle with the task. Former U.S. ambassador to South Korea, National Security Adviser, and CIA officer Donald Gregg has described North Korea as the "longest-running intelligence failure in the history of US espionage". Former CIA director Robert Gates called it the "toughest intelligence target in the world". Economist Rüdiger Frank, speaking about difficulties with analyzing North Korean economic data, said "The main problem is not the reliability of data; there is a lack of numbers in general, even manipulated ones".

Isaac Stone Fish of Foreign Policy and Christophe Deloire of Reporters Without Borders have described the country as an information "black hole". Simple facts, such as whether marijuana is illegal in North Korea, are difficult to ascertain. According to Ralph Cossa, president of the Pacific Forum of the Center for Strategic and International Studies, "Anyone who tells you that they know anything for certain about North Korea is either trying to kid you or trying to kid themselves." Analyst Andrei Lankov has compared reporting North Korea to the parable of the blind men and an elephant, with analysts falsely extrapolating from limited data. Several authors have referred to a North Korean "rumor mill". South Korean journalists and media experts have described this as a "systemic problem".

Due to the popularity of North Korean news, however, stories are frequently widely circulated in the global media with minimal fact-checking or analysis. Often journalists retail stories uncritically because they assess them as impossible to verify. South Korean journalists have reported a vicious circle, in which a rumour reported in South Korea is picked up by an international media outlet and then is reported by the South Korean media as fact. False reports of deaths and coups have occurred frequently over decades.

In 2020, academics and politicians in South Korea expressed their concern about false reporting of North Korea. Kyungnam University's Institute of Far Eastern Studies published a book, Multi-layer Analysis and Understanding of False Information about North Korea, about the issue.

== Reporting in North Korea ==
Media in North Korea are under some of the strictest government control in the world. The main local media outlet is the Korean Central News Agency. North Korea has a high level of security and secrecy. Communication with the outside world is limited, and internal communication also seems limited at times. Reporters Without Borders describes North Korea as the world's most closed country, ranking it last in the Press Freedom Index. DPRK Today is a Chinese-based website that carries North Korean propaganda but is not exactly the mouthpiece of the North Korean government.

The North Korean government places stringent restrictions on foreign reporters, visitors, and even residents of foreign origin. Freedom of movement is severely curtailed, interactions with local people are supervised, and photography is heavily regulated. Because of this reporters often find it difficult to check stories and establish hard facts. North Korean and Western journalists have different understandings about the role of the media. (The situation is different for Russian and Chinese journalists reporting on North Korea). North Koreans expect Western journalists to behave like Soviet journalists during the Cold War, while Western journalists would like to exert the freedom of the press more widely. Researching topics like prison camps are out of bounds, and North Korean officials are often reluctant to give statements on the record. As with tourists, foreign journalists are always accompanied by minders, and any encounters with locals have been arranged. Foreign journalists have access to the Internet, making real-time reporting possible. Although control is strict, foreign journalists are only rarely expelled from the country. In 2014, photographer Eric Lafforgue was banned from returning after taking many candid photographs. In 2019, Australian student Alek Sigley was detained and deported on the grounds that the columns he wrote for news outlets such as NK News were espionage.

In 2019, there were only five foreign correspondents permanently stationed in North Korea: from Russia's TASS news agency, China's People's Daily, China Central Television, Xinhua, and Cuba's Prensa Latina. Cuba's correspondent had greater access than many foreign journalists, but still faced restrictions, such as being unable to use public transport. Freelance journalists occasionally visit, and large numbers of international media converge on the country during major events.

The Associated Press opened a video-only bureau in Pyongyang in 2006. In 2012, the bureau became the first Western all-format bureau in the country. The bureau does not have a full-time presence. Rather, the journalists can only stay for weeks at a time in the country before having to renew their visa. David Guttenfelder visited North Korea as an AP photographer between 2000 and 2013 and experienced the easing of restrictions over time. In 2013, he reported being able to upload photographs onto Instagram without censorship.

Agence France-Presse opened a bureau in 2016. Under an agreement with the Korean Central News Agency, AFP will be able to send teams of journalists into the country. As part of the agreement, a North Korean photographer and a videographer will produce content under AFP supervision. Japan’s Kyodo news agency also has a bureau, but like AP and AFP does not have full-time staff.

== Reporting outside North Korea ==
Many analysts and journalists have never visited North Korea or have had very limited access. As a result, their books and articles may rely on speculation and scanty information gleaned from a single, uncorroborated source, such as a defector. Other reports rely on the analysis of satellite imagery.

NK News aims to be the most reliable source of news about North Korea. It has staff in the US, Europe, and South Korea.

South Korean–based Daily NK uses a network of anonymous North Korean informants from across the country.

== Defectors as sources ==
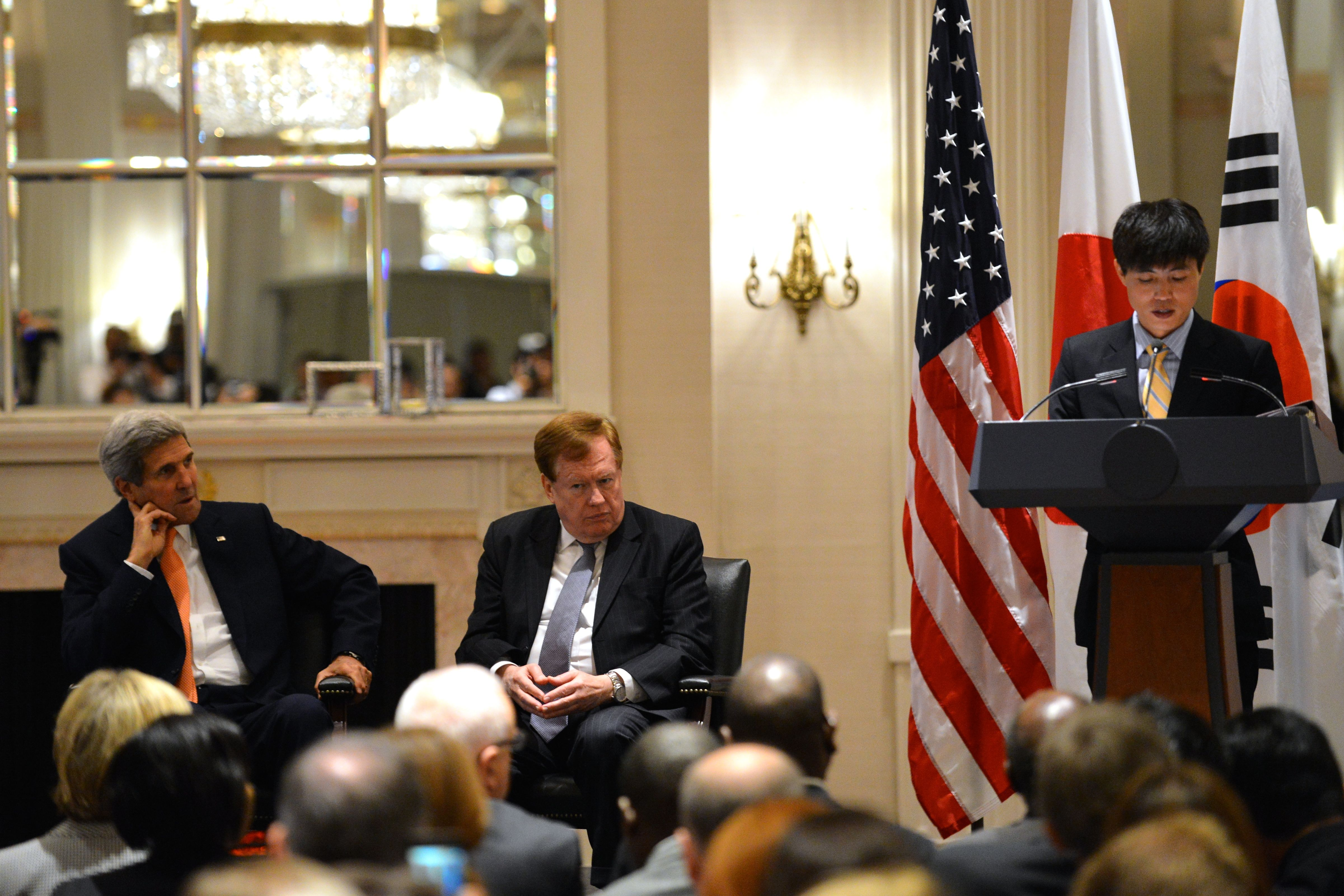
US Secretary of State John Kerry listens to Shin Dong-hyuk speak about his experiences in North Korea

Defectors from North Korea are a key source of first-hand information for intelligence officers, scholars, activists, and journalists. While their testimony is considered valuable, there is growing skepticism about the veracity of their accounts. Often, defectors are cited anonymously to protect their identities, which makes it difficult to verify their information. Moreover, defectors often have limited experience and are not experts on North Korea.

For their part, when surveyed in 2017 by the National Human Rights Commission of Korea, many defectors complained that journalists had violated their right to privacy.

Felix Abt, a Swiss businessman who lived in the DPRK, argues that defectors are inherently biased. He says that 70 percent of defectors in South Korea are unemployed, and selling sensationalist stories is a way for them to make a living. He also says that the overwhelming majority of defectors come from North Hamgyong Province, one of North Korea's poorest provinces, and often have a grudge against Pyongyang and provinces nearby. He says that defectors in South Korea's resettlement process tailor their accounts over time to become less mundane and more propagandistic. He criticizes journalists and academics for not being skeptical about even the most outlandish claims made by defectors. Similarly, academic Hyung Gu Lynn has commented that some defectors embellish or fabricate their stories to sell books or lobby for regime change. Representatives of the defector community in South Korea have also expressed concern about the unreliability of defector testimony.

The journalist Jiyoung Song has said that she has encountered numerous inconsistent stories when researching defectors over sixteen years. She noted that cash payments for interviews are standard and have increased over the years. The more exclusive or emotional the story is, the higher the payment. Other South Korean journalists have accused defectors of producing fantasies for money.

After extensively interviewing Shin Dong-hyuk, a prominent defector, the journalist Blaine Harden wrote in 2012 that, "There was, of course, no way to confirm what he was saying. Shin was the only available source of information about his early life". According to Harden, Shin confessed that his original story about his mother, told in interviews to South Korea's National Intelligence Service and others, and in his memoir, was not true: "Shin said he had been lying about his mother's escape. He invented the lie just before arriving in South Korea." In January 2015, Harden announced that Shin had admitted that the account of his life that he had given Harden was also false. Analyst Andrei Lankov commented that "some suspicions had been confirmed when Shin suddenly admitted what many had hitherto suspected", described Harden's book as unreliable, and noted that defectors faced considerable psychological pressure to embroider their stories.

In 2017, Chun Hye Sung, a defector who had been a guest on several South Korean TV shows using the name Lim Ji-hyun, returned to the North. On North Korean TV, she said that she had been pressured into fabricating stories detrimental to North Korea. The South Korean broadcaster denied her claims, and some observers suggested she was speaking under duress.

== Political bias ==
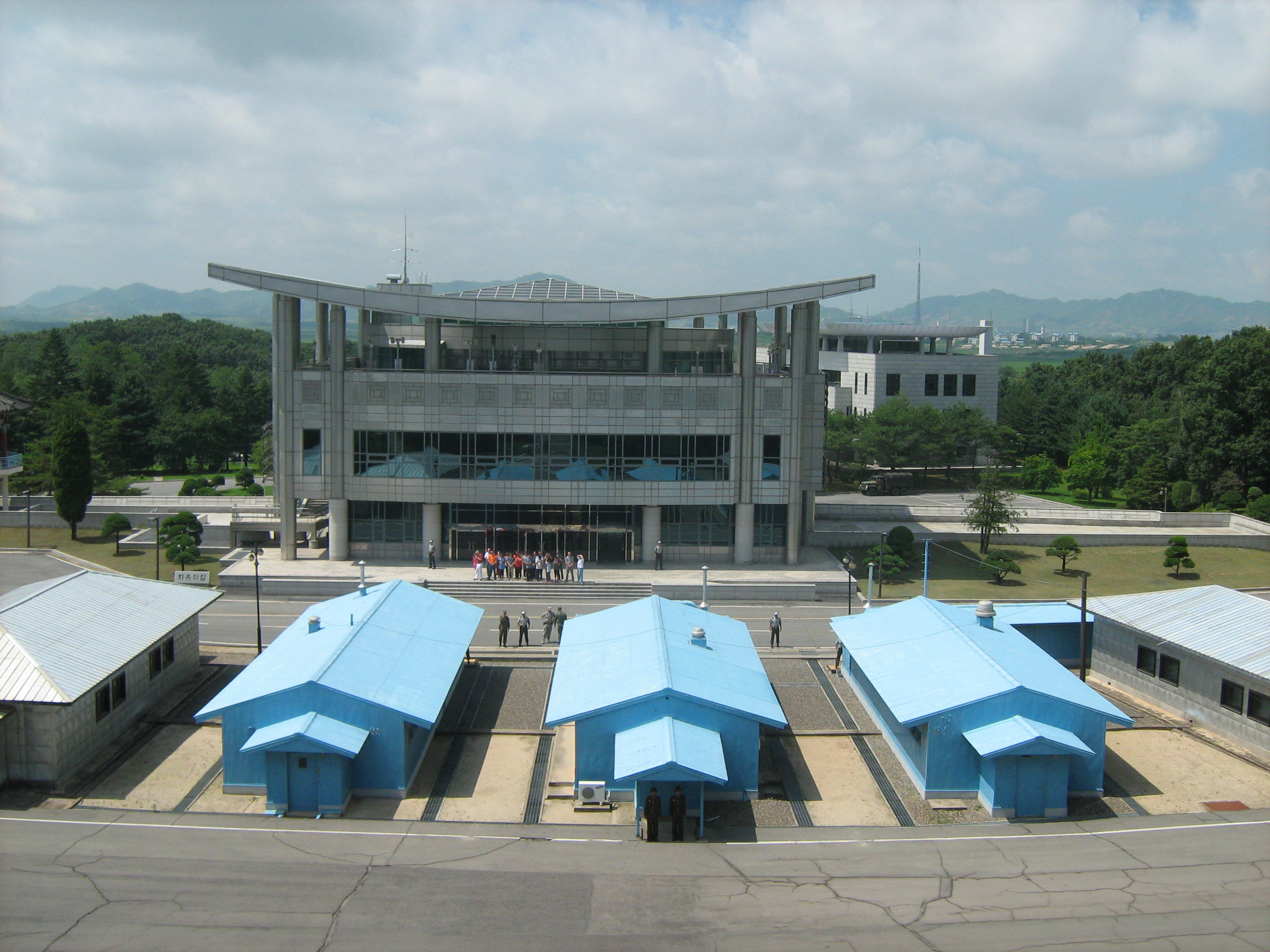
The Korean DMZ, viewed from the north. The political division of Korea continues to affect the media coverage of North Korea.

Since the Korean War (1950–1953), North and South Korea have confronted each other over the Korean Demilitarized Zone, with a permanent American garrison force situated in the south. Factual reporting can be a casualty of this cold war. Journalists and media experts in South Korea have concluded that political hostility distorts media coverage. According to Damin Jung of NK News writing in 2017, South Korea had the potential to deliver accurate reportage, but was in fact the source of some of the most unreliable coverage. Journalists operated according to a wartime mindset, which moderated in times of detente. Overall, reporting was strongly influenced by the political climate in South Korea. South Korean journalists were generally prohibited from accessing North Korean media and few have been to the North. Reports were shallow and poorly researched. Corrections to reports about North Korea were practically unknown in South Korea.

North Korean authorities have attributed erroneous reporting on the country to disinformation spread by South Korea and the United States. The Committee for the Peaceful Reunification of the Fatherland, a DPRK-backed organisation, has accused the Chosun Ilbo, a major South Korean newspaper, of employing "hack journalists" who intentionally report false information at the behest of the South Korean government. The American journalist Barbara Demick has made a similar criticism. After the breakdown of talks with Donald Trump in Hanoi, Chosun Ilbo reported that Kim Jong Un's negotiating team had been executed or sent to labour camps. However, lead negotiator Kim Yong-chol appeared at a function shortly afterwards.

Often the information release route is that the South Korean National Intelligence Service briefs South Korean politicians, who then brief the media, providing the possibility of misunderstanding especially to reporters eager for lurid stories. South Korean officials routinely brief the media anonymously, so there is no accountability if the information is later found to be incorrect. Moreover, the NIS has been accused of disseminating unverified information — such as the false report of the execution of General Ri Yong-gil — which supports the depiction of North Korea as a dangerous and unstable country. According to American historian Bruce Cumings, South Korean intelligence services have a long history of providing disinformation to foreign journalists.

The South Korean National Security Act has been used to restrict academic freedom and discussion on North Korean topics, according to Amnesty International. According to their report, the law has been used to imprison people for publishing pro-North Korean material online. The National Security Act has historically been utilized to block South Koreans from viewing US-based news websites focused on North Korea. Among these were NK News in 2014 and North Korea Tech in 2016.

Korean studies analyst Andrei Lankov argues that the mainstream media suppresses stories about relative improvements in North Korea to avoid giving support to its government or being perceived to do so.

In June 2013, Washington Post blogger Max Fisher reported claims by New Focus International, a website run by North Korean defectors, that Kim Jong Un had distributed copies of Adolf Hitler's Mein Kampf to other members of the North Korean government. This made the Post the first major media outlet to repeat those rumors, which had been spreading among North Korean defectors in China. In response, scholars Andrei Lankov and Fyodor Tertitskiy pointed out that the story was extremely unlikely: the Soviet influence on history textbooks in North Korea and the fact that Nazi Germany was allied with the Japanese Empire (which had colonized Korea) meant that North Koreans deplored Nazi Germany, and indeed the North Korean state media itself sometimes compared South Korean or American leaders to Hitler. Lankov suggested that the eagerness with which media outlets accepted the story pointed to a "simplistic view of the world" in which "the bad guys are also united and share a bad, repressive ideology", while Tertitskiy condemned the rumors as distracting attention from serious news reporting and detracting from its credibility. Both Lankov and Tertitskiy described the rumor as an example of Godwin's law. Fisher himself would later criticize U.S. media outlets for their "high degree of gullibility" in reporting on North Korea.

== Cultural misunderstandings ==
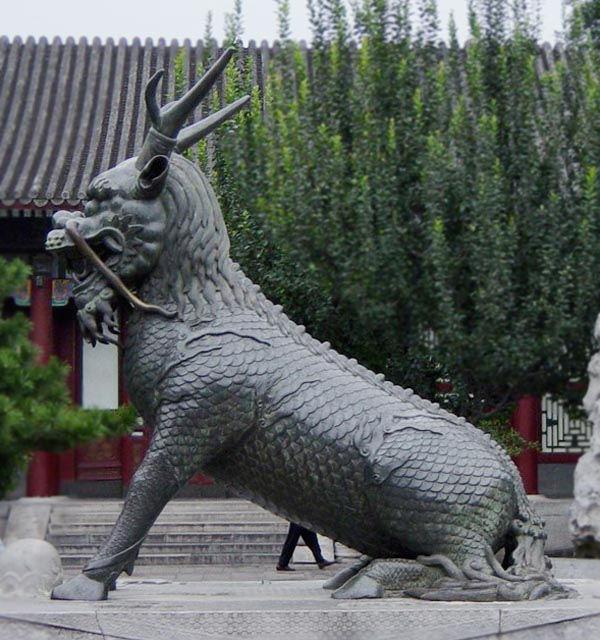
A statue of the mythological kirin or "Chinese unicorn", which North Korea never claimed existed

In 2012, a number of international media outlets reported that North Korea had claimed to have discovered evidence of unicorns. In reporting on the purported announcement, U.S. News & World Report somberly declared it to be "the latest in a series of myths trumpeted by North Korean news sources." Subsequent analysis of the original DPRK statement, however, showed that the announcement involved the archaeological discovery of the "unicorn lair," or kiringul, a poetic term for an archaeological site associated with the ancient capital of King Dongmyeong of Goguryeo, and that neither North Korean academics nor media had ever claimed the literal existence of unicorns.

Following the death of Kim Jong Il, many media outlets reported on scenes broadcast by North Korean press that showed North Korean citizens crying hysterically. Writing in the New Yorker Philip Gourevitch declared the grieving was obviously fake and indicative of the "madness of the Kims' grim dominion over North Korea," while Bill O'Reilly stated that mourners had been "paid in hamburgers." Writing on CNN, John Sifton of Human Rights Watch claimed North Koreans were required by the DPRK government to cry and their "only alternative is to flee". However, wild expressions of grief — including extreme sobbing and fist pounding — are an accepted part of Korean Confucian culture and can regularly be seen in South Korea as well. In fact, during the funeral procession for South Korean president Park Chung Hee, thousands of South Korean women were pictured "screaming, wailing and shaking their fists at heaven." Korea expert B.R. Myers has observed that sadness expressed by North Koreans on learning of the passing of Kim Jong Il was probably "genuine".

== Sensationalism ==
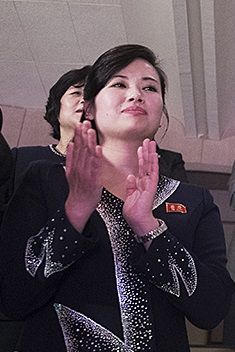
North Korean singer Hyon Song-wol, still alive despite previous rumors of execution

In the absence of solid facts, some reports are based on sensationalist claims, distortions, and unsubstantiated rumors. Many of these stories emanate from South Korea. John Delury from Yonsei University has argued that there is a demand for sensationalist news about North Korea: "There's a global appetite for any North Korea story and the more salacious the better. Some of it is probably true – but a great deal of it is probably not...the normal standards of journalism are thrown out of the window because the attitude is: 'it's North Korea – no one knows what's going on in there.'" Australian academic Jeffrey Robertson has said that North Korea is an "easy target" for media organisations driven by clickbait and soundbite. Jean Lee, the former Associated Press Pyongyang bureau chief commented that "when it comes to North Korea, the more horrible, the more salacious, the more entertaining, the more it fits into the narrative as the North Koreans being these insane outliers", the more likely it is to be published. Author and retired British diplomat James Hoare wrote, "The main emphasis in British coverage of North Korea is on the odd and the peculiar."

The Washington Post's Max Fisher has written that, in regard to North Korea, "almost any story is treated as broadly credible, no matter how outlandish or thinly sourced." Fisher quoted Isaac Stone Fish of Foreign Policy joking that "as an American journalist you can write almost anything you want about North Korea and people will just accept it". Isaac Stone Fish himself admitted to painting a picture of North Korea in the grip of a drug epidemic with very little hard evidence to back it up. According to Chad O'Carroll of NK News, these stories have a tendency to go "viral". They are very attractive to online news organizations because they lure traffic to their websites. They also spread rapidly. A hoax, a mistranslation, or a line of cautious commentary can escalate into a global media sensation. Even reputable news organizations are not immune. The New York Times has been criticized for repeatedly making misleading and sensationalist claims about North Korea's missile program.

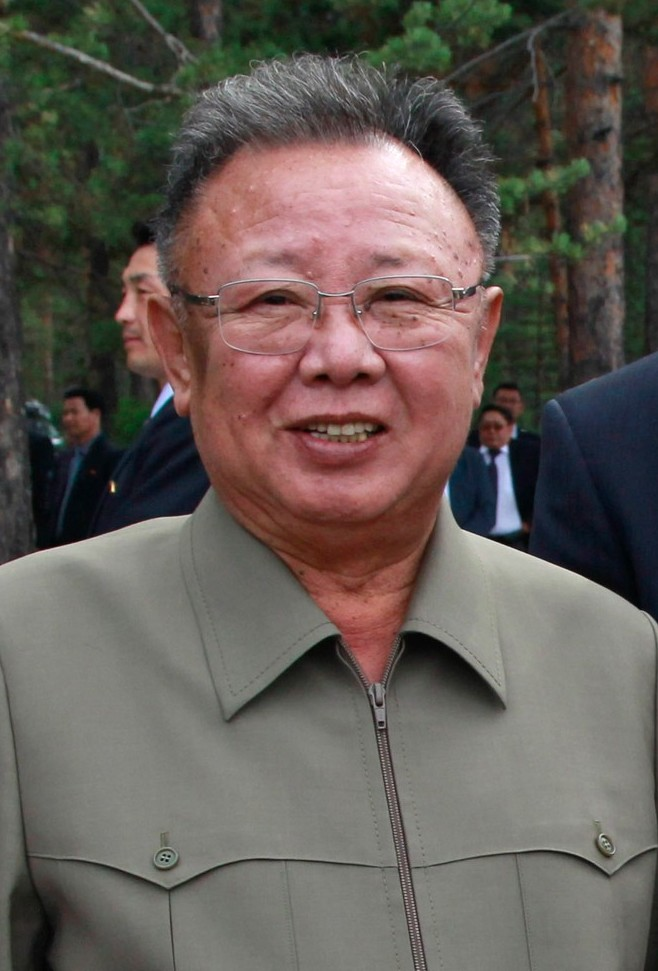
Kim Jong Il, who never claimed to have shot five holes-in-one in golf

Over several years, many international news outlets have reported that North Korean media claimed that Kim Jong Il shot five holes in one his first time playing golf, or achieved some other improbable score. The implication of the story is that the North Korean government attributes superhuman feats to its leaders as part of a cult of personality. Despite the wide propagation of the story, no North Korea media source for the report has ever been produced. NK News reports that "informal surveys of North Koreans themselves revealed that no one in Pyongyang was aware of this legendary feat, unless told it by a tourist." Richard Seers, a British journalist who played at the Pyongyang Golf Club, asked officials there, who indicated it was nothing more than an urban myth. The Korea Times has traced the story to Australian journalist Eric Ellis, who heard the tall story from the club professional at Pyongyang Golf Club in 1994.

Kim Chol was a Vice Minister of Defense who was allegedly purged and executed by a mortar round for "drinking and carousing" during the period of mourning for Kim Jong Il. The story, originally reported by the Chosun Ilbo, was picked up by the world's media. However, subsequent analysis by Foreign Policy determined the claims most likely originated from a rumour, and NK News observed the story "demonstrates how a single anonymous source can generate a story in the South Korean press, which then gets escalated into all-caps certainties for news outlets such as the Daily Mail."

On 29 August 2013, The Chosun Ilbo reported that North Korean singer Hyon Song-wol was executed by firing squad, together with eleven other performers, including members of the Unhasu Orchestra and Wangjaesan Light Music Band, on the orders of North Korean leader Kim Jong Un. The story was reported worldwide. It was claimed she was Kim Jong Un's ex-girlfriend and that she and the others had made pornographic videos. North Korea's KCNA denied claims that the singer was executed, and a Japanese news magazine reported that she was seen subsequently. On 16 May 2014, Hyon appeared on North Korean television participating in the National Convention of Artists, disproving the rumors.

FAIR criticized The Washington Post for covering a sensationalist story about the alleged execution of General Hyon Yong-chol due to questionable sources and circumstances of information with the sole source being South Korea's NIS. South Korean lawmakers questioned NIS's claim of Hyon's execution, and a spokesman said reports should be taken as rumors.

From 2013 onwards, there was a stream of reports that Kim Jong Un's aunt, Kim Kyong-hui, had died from a stroke or a heart attack or had been poisoned by Kim Jong Un. In January 2020, she appeared in North Korean media, attending a lunar new year concert with Kim Jong Un.

In April 2020, a three-week absence from public view led to speculation that Kim Jong Un was seriously ill or even dead. In August, rumors circulated that he was in a coma and that the photographs of him carrying out his duties were faked. In October 2026, there were further rumours that Kim was dead.

In May 2020, South Korean media reported on the "myth" that Kim Il Sung could teleport. This was traced back to a comment by Kim in 1945, in which, commenting on his guerrilla days, he denied he could teleport.

== Stereotypes and caricatures ==
According to Gianluca Spezza of NK News, overused stereotypical labels applied to North Korea like "Hermit Kingdom", "secretive" and "unpredictable" make for "catchy headlines and are an easy sell". Analyst Andrei Lankov observed that "Tales of North Korean lunacy are never far from the front pages", but argued that the depiction of the regime as irrational is false and potentially disastrous. This, combined with limitations on reporting in the country, leads to many stories becoming little more than repetitions of clichés. According to American historian Bruce Cumings, the same kinds of stories have been circulating since North Korea was founded, repeated endlessly like the footage of military parades. Overall, the media portrayal of North Korea has been described as a "cartoon caricature".

Some defectors have commented that the media depiction of North Korea is sometimes ridiculously different from the country that they lived in. Several visitors have reported that the North Korea that they experienced was worlds away from the barren landscapes, starving people, and goose-stepping troops portrayed in the media.

Media coverage of Kim Jong Un has tended to treat him as a caricature, calling him "fat boy" and depicting him as a baby. He is portrayed as childish and irrational, prone to dangerous tantrums. According to scholar Jung H. Pak, this led to misunderstandings that distort public discussion.

== False predictions ==
Due to the limited information, it is hard to make accurate predictions about North Korea. North Korea's collapse has been predicted for decades, for example, after the Korean War, during the economic collapse in the 1990s, as well as after Kim Il Sung's death in 1994, Kim Jong Il's death in 2011, and rumours of Kim Jong Un's death in 2020.

According to analyst Daniel R Depetris, the media often cherry-picks the most sensational prediction. On 3 December 2019, North Korean Vice Foreign Minister Ri Thae-song rhetorically asked what kind of "Christmas gift" the US wanted from North Korea. Many media outlets interpreted this as saying that North Korea was going to test an ICBM on Christmas Day, but nothing eventuated.

== Hoaxes and satire ==
Serious news organizations have occasionally mistaken hoaxes and satire for genuine stories. In June 2016, South Korea's financial markets were shaken by reports of the death of North Korean leader Kim Jong Un, which originated from a parody news website.

In 2013, a short film titled How Americans Live was widely disseminated on the Internet. The film showed images, supposedly of the United States, with a stilted English narration making over-the-top claims about various depredations experienced in American society, such as people being forced to eat snow for sustenance. Spencer Ackerman of Wired called the film a "North Korean propaganda video" while the Washington Post, in its analysis, declared the video's message to be "consistent with North Korean propaganda". It was subsequently revealed the film was a satirical video created by British travel writer Alun Hill.

Following the 2013 arrest and execution of DPRK official Jang Sung-taek on charges of corruption, some media outlets reported he had been eaten alive by a pack of ravenous dogs on the orders of Kim Jong Un. After the reports began to gain traction, Trevor Powell, a Chicago-based software engineer, discovered the story had originated from the blog of a Chinese satirist. In the wake of the revelation, some media retracted their original stories.

In 2014, Brazilian humorist Maurício Cid created a fake YouTube channel called "Korea News Backup" that supposedly uploaded videos from North Korean television. During the 2014 FIFA World Cup, the channel posted videos of North Korea defeating the teams from the United States, China, Japan, among others, and winning the championship in a 8–1 match against Brazil. Many international media outlets reported those videos as "government propaganda" from North Korea, such as Daily Mirror, Metro, CBC and Toronto Sun. Cid later revealed the hoax and how it was made, and published a final video on the YouTube channel.

== See also ==
- Atrocity propaganda
- Cannabis in North Korea
- Chojoongdong
- Kippumjo
- Media of North Korea
- North Korean studies
- Photojournalism in North Korea
