= Kiringul =

Cave in North Korea

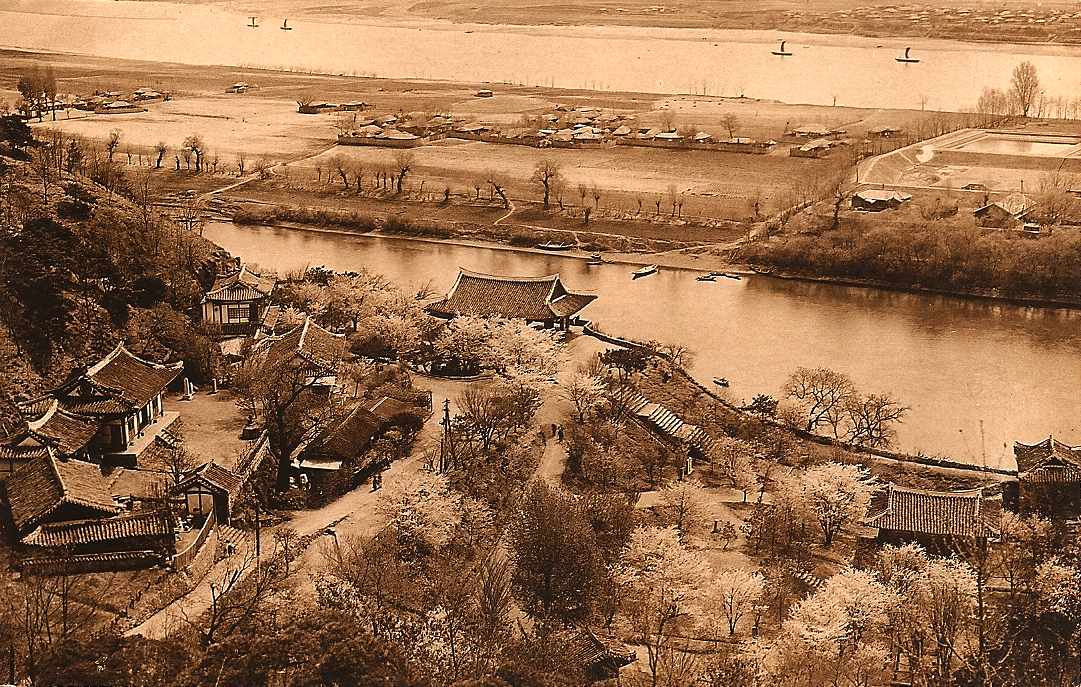
- Kiringul is purportedly located near the Yongmyong Temple in Pyongyang (pictured in the 1930s)

Korean name
- Hangul: 기린굴
- Hanja: 麒麟窟
- RR: Giringul
- MR: Kirin'gul

Kiringul (Korean: 기린굴; lit. 'Kirin's Grotto') is a cave in North Korea said to have been the home of the kirin (Qilin in Chinese), a mythical chimaeric beast that was reputedly ridden by King Dongmyeong of Goguryeo in the 1st century BC.

In November 2012, the state-owned Korean Central News Agency reported that the site had been discovered in Moranbong near the North Korean capital, Pyongyang. The North Korean government claims that the discovery proves that Pyongyang is the historic capital of Korea. Analysts outside North Korea have put the announcement in the context of long-running North Korean attempts to link the country's regime with the ancient Korean kings, and so position it as the legitimate heir to the legacy of Goguryeo.

== Discovery ==
On 29 November 2012, the North Korean state-owned Korean Central News Agency reported that archaeologists "recently reconfirmed a lair of the unicorn rode [sic] by King Tongmyong, founder of the Koguryŏ [Goguryeo] Kingdom (BC 277–AD 668)." The discovery was said to have been made by the History Institute of the DPRK Academy of Social Sciences at Moranbong, Pyongyang, only 200 metres (660 ft) from the site of the Buddhist temple Yongmyongsa. According to the report, the words "Unicorn Lair" were found carved on a rock at the site. The inscription is believed to date back to the period of the kingdom of Goryeo (918–1392). The report also states this "proves that Pyongyang was a capital city of Ancient Korea".

== Reaction and analysis ==
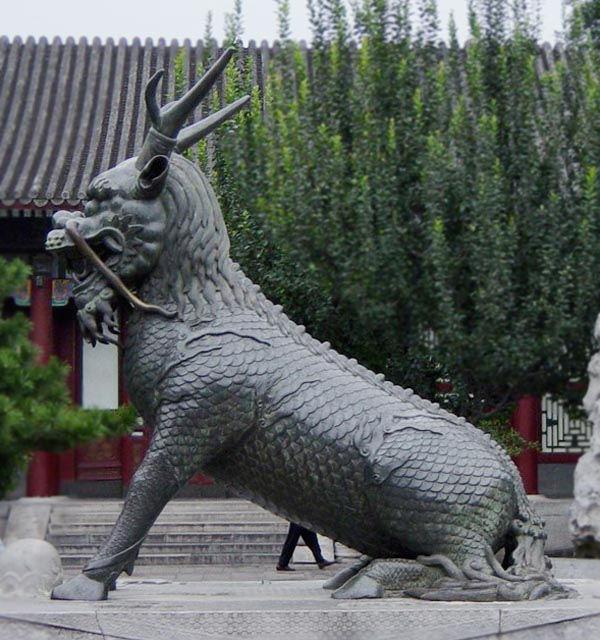
A kirin in Beijing – a mythological creature which has often been referred to as the "Chinese unicorn"

The report attracted widespread international coverage for the apparently bizarre nature of the claim to have found a "unicorn lair", but subsequent reports suggested that the Korean terminology had been mistranslated. The original Korean-language report referred not to a unicorn but to a kirin (or qilin in Chinese), a mythological chimaera-like beast with "the body of a deer, the tail of a cow, hooves and a mane", as well as a single horn on its head. The creature was said to have been King Dongmyeong's favourite means of transport. The place in question is called Kiringul or "Kirin's Grotto". Despite the name, it was not literally supposed to have been a place where kirin lived, but was instead a mythical name akin to the Giant's Causeway in Northern Ireland.

A report on io9 noted that Kiringul had never actually been lost in the first place. An artificial tunnel in Pyongyang was described by researcher Jeon Kwan Su in a 2009 article, "Kiringul sinhwa yŏngu" ("Study of the Kiringul Myth"), published in the Korean journal Tongpang Hakji. The 2012 North Korean report was ambiguous about whether the discovery was of the cave itself, of an older inscription marking its location, or simply of the previously described site of Kiringul. It is not even clear whether the ancient capital of Goguryeo was located at Pyongyang in the first place.

Commentators pointed out that there was a substantial element of propaganda in the North Korean announcement. As Korea researcher Sixiang Wang notes, "The Kirin was supposed to appear to wise rulers. North Korean officials may have been hoping to secure Pyongyang's connection to the ancient kingdom of Goguryeo, while creating an association between their own leader, Kim Jong Un, and the larger-than-life rulers of old." A professor of Korean studies at Tufts University referred to the discovery as "symbolic", and said the people of North Korea would accept it more as a morale "boost". The association of the new North Korean leader Kim Jong-un with the ancient kingdom would give him "the legitimacy he lacks".

Foreign Policy also noted the efforts of the North Korean regime to associate its leaders with ancient Korean kings, such as reconstructing King Dongmyeong's mausoleum and running propaganda stories linking Kim Jong-un with Goguryeo traditions. The North Korean government has also utilised its propaganda claims to the legacy of Goguryeo to score points against China and Japan, its traditional rivals, over territorial and political disputes with those countries.

== See also ==
- Korean mythology
- Media coverage of North Korea
