= Informal economy of China =

The informal economy of the People's Republic of China refers to a range of informal economic activity that stands outside of the recognized systems of regulations, taxation, and licenses. Although the term is sometimes understood to describe marginal, unregulated, and even criminal activity, there is considerable overlap between the informal sector and formal economy, and the informal economy serves an important societal function in contributing to employment and economic growth.

The informal economy in China represents a large portion of domestic output, consumption and employment. Employment in the urban sector represents a major part of the Chinese economy: approximately half of urban Chinese workers belong to the informal economy as of 2004.—a significant increase since the 1990s. It is described as fast-growing, dynamic, highly competitive, and it contributes substantially to economic growth. However, there are serious concerns about the lack of protections afforded to workers in the informal sector.

In addition, China is a major part of the global informal sector, producing unregulated goods for consumption in Africa, Latin America, and elsewhere. According to Roberta Neuwirth, China's rise as a global center of manufacturing owes, in part, to its willingness to trade in the informal economy, also known as system D trade. In some regions in China, local governments have adopted policies designed to encourage the informal economy to alleviate unemployment.

== Development and causes ==
China's informal economy underwent significant changes following the establishment of the People's Republic of China (PRC) in 1949. In the early years of the PRC, the state aimed to suppress market activities and establish institutions that would bring economic life more fully under state control. However, contrary to intentions of the state, Chinese citizens continued to engage in market-based transactions long after the CCP's "socialist transformation" of the Chinese economy was ostensibly complete. For example, in 1960s Chengdu, merchants were pushed out of the formal economy and into the illicit sphere when local official revoked their licenses but provided few alternative employment opportunities. In other parts of rural China, there was a "a silent revolution" wherein "villagers surreptitiously reconnected with traditional practices... and cadres stood back and allowed villagers to go about their business." Within the interstitial spaces of the formal Maoist economy, entrepreneurial actors, ranging from petty ration coupon traders to underground factory owners, continued building productive assemblages of capital, labor, and knowledge. Over time these private activities grew in scale and scope, and by the mid-1970s, had become pervasive and normalized at the grassroots level. This informal economy constituted a substantial proportion of local economic output throughout the Maoist era, as much as 15 percent of tertiary sector GDP.

As the reform and opening up started Deng Xiaoping, the private economy was permitted to develop, and often emerged in the form of unregulated micro-enterprises, family enterprises, or individual purveyors of goods and services.

Some of the causes accounting for the rise of the informal sector of the Chinese economy includes weak legal and social safety nets; international demand for ‘System D’ products; economic shifts such as urbanization and the decline of state-owned enterprises.

== Employment in the informal economy ==
By some estimates, nearly half of employment in urban China is in the informal economy. Many of these workers—approximately 120 million to 150 million — are migrant workers who are not registered to work in cities, and therefore lack a number of formal protections.

== See also ==
- Black market
- Jangmadang
