= Poverty in North Korea =

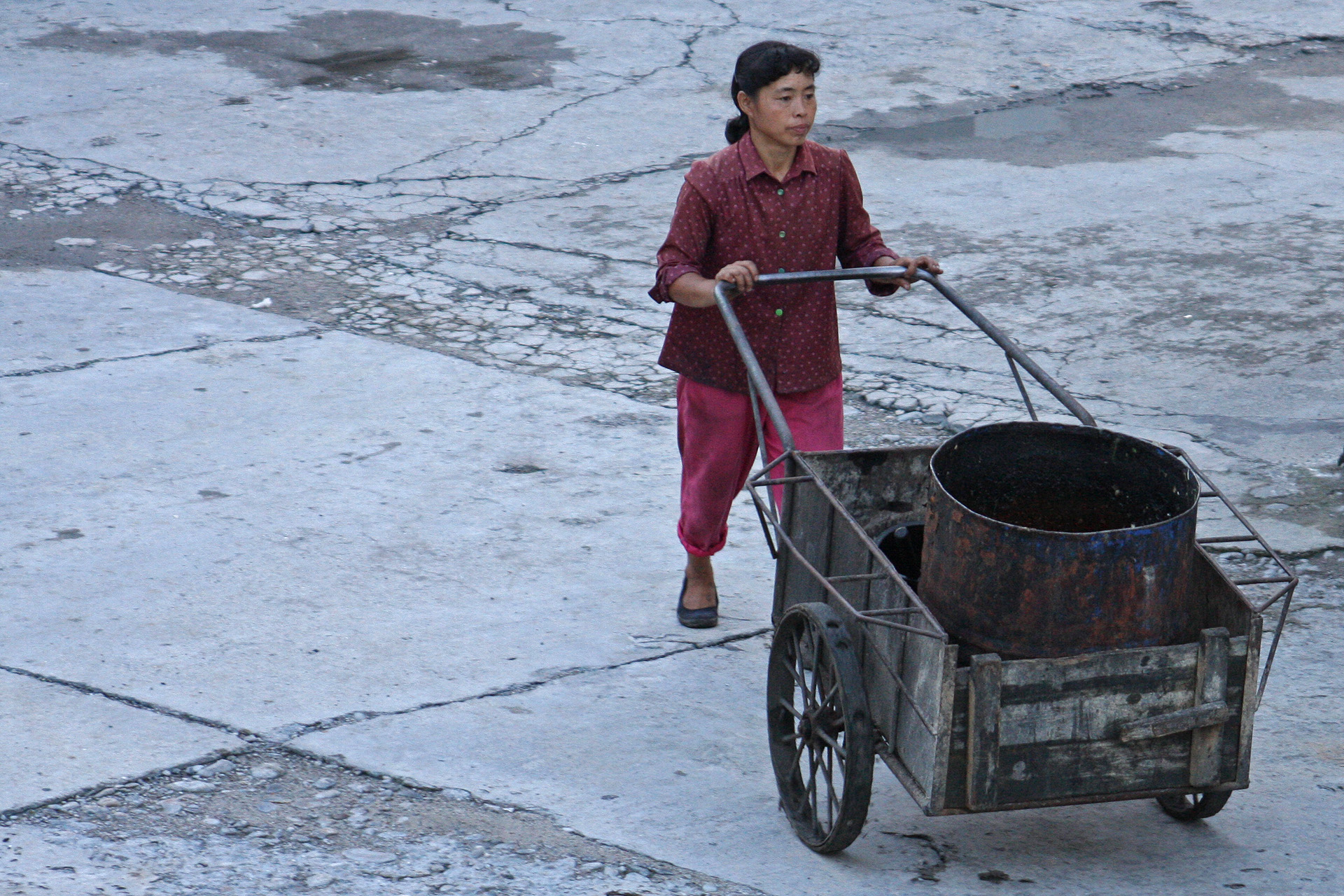
A woman pushing a cart in Hyangsan County

Poverty in North Korea is extensive, though reliable statistics are hard to come by due to lack of reliable research, pervasive censorship and extensive media manipulation in North Korea.

Poverty in North Korea has been widely reported by Western media sources with the majority referring to the famine that affected the country in the mid-1990s. A 2006 report suggests that North Korea required an estimated 5.3M tonnes of grain per year while harvesting only an estimated 4.5M tonnes, and thus relies on foreign aid to overcome the deficit. Starvation continues to be a systemic problem. In 2021, there were reports of widespread starvation in North Korea.

Poverty in North Korea has also been attributed to poor governance by the government and sanctions. Scholars have also linked poverty in North Korea to structural inequality, weak social protection systems, and the state's limited capacity to implement poverty-related development goals.

Marketization has also been identified as an important factor influencing poverty in North Korea. Since the economic crisis of the 1990s, the expansion of informal markets (Jangmadang) has played a growing role in household survival strategies, while also contributing to inequality due to uneven access to market opportunities across different regions and social groups.

Food insecurity has also had important nutritional consequences in North Korea, especially for children and adolescents. Korean research on changes in the country's food distribution system has emphasized that malnutrition among young people is a particularly serious issue because growth and health deficits accumulated during childhood are difficult to reverse later in life.

International humanitarian assistance has remained closely tied to poverty alleviation in North Korea, particularly in areas such as food security, nutrition, health care, water, and sanitation. It is estimated that in 2020, 60% of the North Korean population were living below the poverty line.

As of 2025, the World Bank lists North Korea as a low-income economy, with a GNI per capita of US$650.00.

== See also ==
- Media coverage of North Korea
- Jangmadang
- Economy of North Korea#Crisis and famine
- 1990s North Korean famine
- Human rights in North Korea
- Agriculture in North Korea
