= DPRK Amateur Golf Open =

The DPRK Amateur Golf Open
Tournament information
- Location: North Korea
- Established: 2011
- Course: Pyongyang Golf Complex
- Par: 72
- Month played: July

Current champion
- Lukasz Tomiewicz

The DPRK Amateur Golf Open is an annual amateur event which takes place outside Pyongyang, North Korea. It was launched in 2011 at the country's only open golf course. The format of the tournament varies each year, and has not been played since 2016.

== History ==
North Korea currently has two golf courses, one of them currently out-of-use at Mount Kumgang and the other, the Pyongyang Golf Club, 27 km from Pyongyang.

The Pyongyang Golf Complex was designed and built in 1987 by a Japanese company. The course is mainly played by diplomatic staff.

In 2004, Koryo Tours hosted the Pyongyang Friendship Golf Tournament. It was a 9-hole event played by 8 competitors.

In January 2011, North Korea announced that they would host the first-ever fully fledged 18-hole international affair. The first event took place over one day in April 2011. The tournament was played in Callaway format. In 2012 the tournament took place over three days, with both Callaway and Stableford formats used. The 2013 event took place from May 25 to 27 over three days in stroke play format. The 2014 event took place from July 27 to 28 over two days in stroke play format. The 2015 event took place on 6 and 7 September 2015 in stroke play format. Eleven nations took part and the tournament was won by Claudio Consul who broke the course record. The 2016 tournament took place between 8 and 9 October 2016. Eighteen nations took part. The overall winner was Poland's Lukasz Tomiewicz.

== Winners ==
Year	Winner	Country	Handicap
2016	Lukasz Tomiewicz	Poland	
2015	Claudio Consul	Germany	+2
2014	Nobuaki Kasahara	Japan	14
2013	Peter Clark	New Zealand	22
2012	Simon Jones	England	22
2011	Olli Lehtonen	Finland	1.1

== Records ==
The lowest gross score shot during the tournament is 70 by Claudio Consul in 2015. It has been claimed by a Pyongyang Golf Club professional that Kim Jong Il shot a course record of 34 sometime in the early 1990s, including five holes in one. This was stated to Eric Ellis, a reporter for the Australian Financial Review who visited the club in 1994, but has not been confirmed by another source.
