= John Delury =

American historian

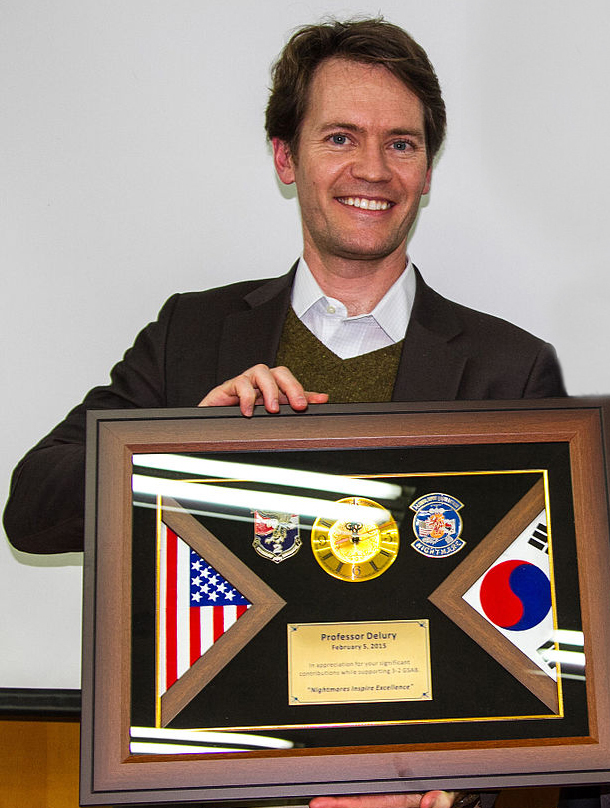
- After a seminar, 3-2 General Support Aviation Battalion thanks Delury, 2015 (cropped)

Academic background
- Education: Yale University
- Doctoral advisor: Jonathan Spence
- Influences: Orville Schell

Academic work
- Discipline: Chinese history
- Institutions: Yonsei University
- Main interests: Modern Chinese history, U.S.-China relations, Korean peninsula affairs
- Notable works: Wealth and Power: China's Long March to the Twenty-first Century (co-author)

John Delury is an American East Asia scholar, with special interests in the history of China, U.S.-China relations and Korean peninsula affairs. He is professor of history at Yonsei University in Seoul.

== Background and education ==
Delury trained at Yale University, receiving a B.A. (1997), M.A. (2003) and a Ph.D. in 2007, with all degrees in history. He is Professor of Chinese Studies at Yonsei University Graduate School of International Studies in Seoul, South Korea. He had previously taught at Brown University, Columbia University and Peking University. He was the associate director of the Asia Society Center on U.S.-Chinese relations. He is the author of Agents of Subversion: The Fate of John T. Downey and the CIA's Covert War in China (Cornell, 2022) and co-author, with Orville Schell, of Wealth and Power: China's Long March to the Twenty-first Century (Random House, 2013). He is a frequent contributor to multiple journals and newspapers, including Foreign Affairs, Foreign Policy, Global Asia, 38 North, and The New York Times.

His career as a historian took a self-described detour when he visited South Korea for the first time in 2006 to meet his wife's family. His area of interest had been limited to modern Chinese history. After further visits to Korea, he joined the Yonsei faculty in 2010 and made Seoul his home base. His academic interests have since broadened to include Korean Peninsula studies, North and South; he has visited North Korea four times. He feels that his new interest in Korean affairs has broadened his views on China as well as U.S.-China relations.

After over a dozen years as a professor at Yonsei University he relocated to Rome for two years, then returned to Seoul. In 2023 he was the inaugural Tsao Fellow in China Studies at the American Academy in Rome. In 2024-2025 he was visiting professor of international history and politics at Luiss University and visiting professor of political science at John Cabot University. As of late 2025, he is doing "research, analysis and consulting" as he works on new book projects.

== Views on China ==
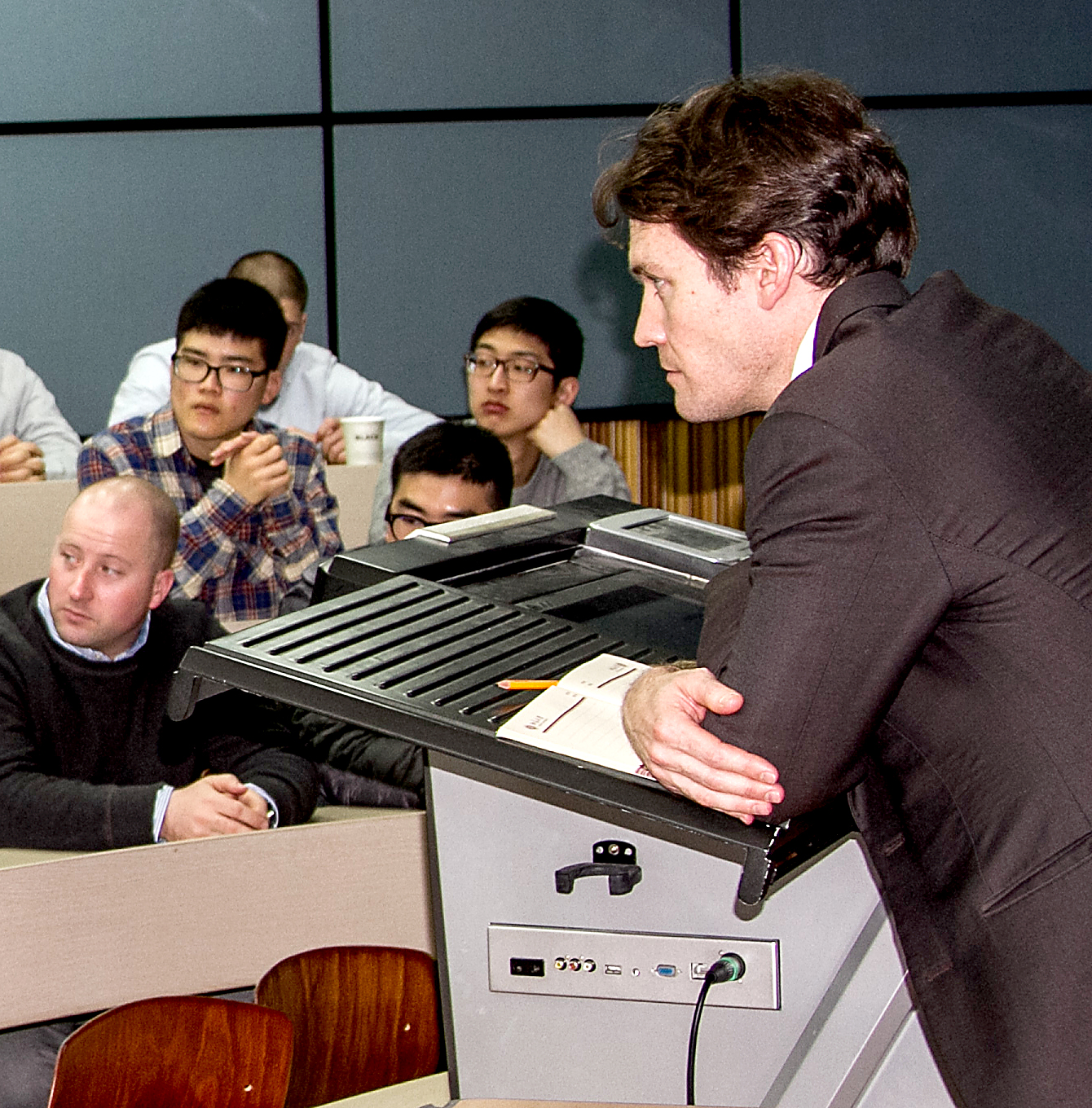
Delury at a lecture

Delury states that knowledge of China's history is critical; without looking backward to grasp the forces at work for hundreds of years, it is not possible to know China today or its possible future trends. He posits that through China's recent history there is one constant: "the search for something, anything," that will restore China's greatness (fuqiang 富強, signifying “wealth and power”). China's challenge now is to reconcile its current success to its past sufferings, and relieve their historical sense of inferiority. Delury looks for historical parallels, such as the 1895 Gongche Shangshu movement, the 1919 May Fourth Movement, the Tiananmen Square protest of 1989, and the 2014 Umbrella Movement, threads which can be strung together, to chart alternate trajectories for the competing visions of China's future political and social order; he opines there are no right or wrong tides of history to take comfort in.

While Mao had contempt for ancient Chinese customs, in the 1980s the Chinese Communist Party (CCP) began to use traditional themes and prominent classical vocabulary. A prominent example is "harmonious society" (Chinese: 和谐社会; pinyin: héxié shèhuì), used as a socioeconomic vision in China and to deflect the problems of social inequality. Delury traces the history and usage of the Chinese word "harmonious" and is critical of the CCP, calling this usage "the pseudo-Confucianism of the CCP." He notes that Xi's political program of austerity is a reflection of a traditional political precept, dating from Confucius.

== Views on North Korea ==
Traveling in North Korea evoked for Delury the sensation of time travel; Kim's charismatic dictatorship and the socialist ethos of Mao on the one side, with the grassroots marketization and consumer revolution of Deng's China on the other. As with the history of China, he feels it is important to know the North Korean history, and he is critical of American officials who know little about this subject. He considers that without this knowledge American officials will find it difficult to understand and realistically deal with North Korea's nuclear weapons program.

Delury has several significant disagreements with President Trump's North Korea policy. President Trump has relied on China's influence on North Korea to exert pressure on the regime to give up its nuclear weapons, using trade with China as an inducement. Delury notes that since 1958 China has not had any meaningful impact on North Korea's foreign policy. Delury has described the sanctions as futile and counterproductive. He has argued that they are unenforceable and unlikely to stop North Korea's nuclear weapons program. He has a more conciliatory approach, suggesting that the best chance for them to give up its nuclear weapons is by helping North Korean economic development. He recommends a gradual elimination of the sanctions. As a deeply isolated autarkic society, he feels North Koreans "will eat grass" before succumbing to sanctions. Talk of a preventive war had become part of the mainstream debate before the recent thaw in U.S.-North Korea relations; Delury feels that this should not be an option. Delury has been described as the media's "go-to expert" on North Korea; he warns that news about North Korea tends to be sensationalized, and care should be taken in judging its veracity.

In April 2020 Kim Jong Un disappeared from public view, and there were many reports of his death or incapacitance. Delury warned that it's very hard to know the truth in this type of situation. "Most of the time we get it wrong."

== See also ==
- Major themes of Wealth and Power: China's Long March to the Twenty-first Century
- Modern China, the creation of a global power
