= Eric Lafforgue =

French photographer (born 1964)

- Born: 17 July 1964 (age 61); France
- Status: Active
- Occupation: Photographer
- Website: www.ericlafforgue.com

Eric Lafforgue (born 17 July 1964) is a French photographer. He has photographed in North Korea, making many trips there, although he is now banned due to his breaking of photography rules. Lafforgue has documented the Guna people of the San Blas Islands, off the coast of Panama, whose existence is threatened by rising sea levels. He started in 2006, and quickly his pictures were used by magazines and publications such as National Geographic.

== Publications ==
- Papous. Kubik, 2007. ISBN 978-2350830476. Text by Almut Schneider.
- Bon Baisers de Corée du Nord. Verlhac, 2012. ISBN 978-2365950053. With a preface by Jacques Séguéla.
- Banni de Corée du Nord. Hachette Tourisme, 2018. ISBN 978-2012440791. French.

== General references ==
- N. Korea bans celebrated photographer Eric Lafforgue
- Eric Lafforgue, bonexpose.com
- Interview with Eric Lafforgue, Written by Bradt Travel Guides
