= Cannabis in North Korea =

- Location of North Korea (dark green)
- Medicinal: Likely not prescribed by doctors
- Recreational: Illegal (but possibly often unenforced)
- Hemp: Legal

The legal status of cannabis in North Korea is unclear due to the lack of sources available to the outside world. Cannabis for industrial purposes (hemp), which has a low THC, is legal and is widely used in the country for the production of consumer goods. As a result of the lack of reliable information on North Korea, myths suggesting the legal or widespread use of marijuana have been spread by some media outlets. While officially illegal, there were reports in the early 2010s that authorities often do not enforce drug laws in relation to cannabis.

According to the Narcotics Control Law of the Democratic People's Republic of Korea (2005), cannabis and hemp resin is listed in Appendix 1 Narcotics, while enantiomers and stereoisomers of THC are listed in Appendix 2 Psychoactive substances with narcotic effects.

== History ==
=== Early history ===
Cannabis was an important crop in ancient Korea, with samples of hempen fabric discovered dating back as early as 3,000 BCE. The traditional sambe cloth is made from hemp.

=== Modern accounts ===
In 2010, the American NGO Open Radio for North Korea stated that their source informed them that a crackdown on meth had been announced in Hamkyungbuk-do; however, the crackdown was focused on methamphetamine, with opium and marijuana not being considered "drugs". In 2013, citing sources at NK News and Reddit, Vice News reported that cannabis was widely used and tolerated in North Korea, smoked as ipdambae (잎담배, "leaf tobacco") by the lower classes as a cheap alternative to cigarettes and to relax after a day of labor. According to Lexi De Coning of MassRoots, it is fairly common for North Koreans to grow their own marijuana, or to simply harvest marijuana plants which grow wild across the country.

However, a reply by journalist Keegan Hamilton in a 2014 article in The Guardian sought to debunk these as rumors. He cited Matthew Reichel of the Pyongyang Project who notes that ipdambae is actually a mixture of herbs and tobacco, superficially resembling cannabis but unrelated. Cannabis is cultivated industrially, but in the form of low-THC hemp, and while some people may cultivate personal amounts of psychoactive cannabis, its use is still illegal, though it is also unlikely to be punished severely. A Swedish ambassador to North Korea said in 2017 that "there should be no doubt that drugs, including marijuana, are illegal here. One can't buy it legally and it would be a criminal offense to smoke it; expect no leniency whatsoever."

== See also ==
- Legality of cannabis
- Smoking in North Korea
