= Photography in Korea =

The practice of photography developed relatively late in Korea, in part because of the because of the Joseon Dynasty's restrictions on contact with foreigners.

In the 1860s and 1870s, a few foreign photographers, including Felix Beato, photographed Korea and Korean people.

In the late 19th century, some Korean photographers appeared. Kim Yong-Won, who was the first professional photographer in Korea, opened a photo studio in 1883. In 1884, Ji Un-Young and Hwang Chul opened studios. But the activities of these studios did not lead to the spread of photography in Korea.

In 1910, Japan colonised Korea and after that, Japanese photographers became very active in Korea. On the other hand, Kyong-sung Photographers' Association (京城写真師会) was founded in 1926. Further, during the 1930s, many Korean amateur photographers appeared, setting up "70 amateur photography clubs with up to 1000 members." The Japanese government restricted Korean photographers' activities during World War II.

After World War II, the amateur photographers' group Chosun Photo Art Study Group (Choson Sajin Yesul Yonguhui) was formed in 1945. Art photography was the dominant tendency among amateur photographers during this period.

== South Korea ==
In the 1960s after the Korean War, photojournalism and commercial photography began to emerge.

After the 1970s, photography became very popular in South Korea, and now is still very popular among Koreans.

== Researchers in this area ==
- 陸命心 (The Department of Photography, Seoul Institute of the Arts, 서울예술대학)
