= Pyongyang Golf Course =

Golf course in Pyongyang, North Korea

Pyongyang Golf Club
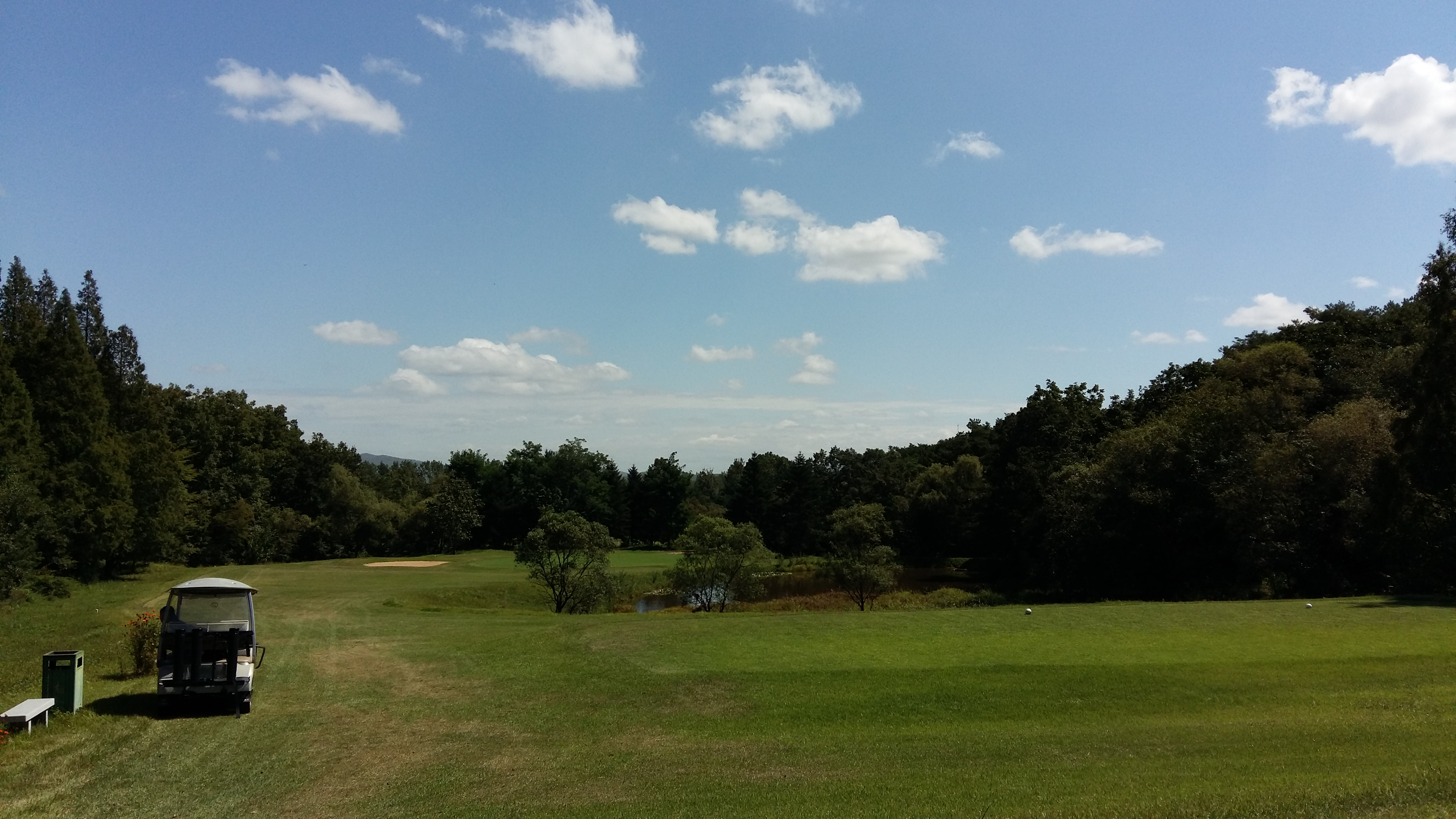
- The 7th hole par 3 in 2015
- Interactive map of Pyongyang Golf Club
- 38.898268°N 125.435830°E

Club information
- Location: Pyongyang, North Korea
- Established: 1987
- Type: Public
- Total holes: 18
- Tournaments: DPRK Amateur Golf Open (2011–present)
- Par: 72
- Length: 6,200 m (6,800 yd)
- Course record: 71 – Claudio Consul (2015)

Pyongyang Golf Club is a golf course in North Korea, situated on the banks of Taicheng Lake, 27 kilometres (17 mi) from central Pyongyang along the Youth Hero Highway. The 18‑hole 72‑par course covers 120 hectares (300 acres) with 45 hectares (110 acres) of green and is approximately 7,000 metres (23,000 ft) long. Its clubhouse covers 2,700 square metres (29,000 sq ft), includes a pro shop and a restaurant that is said to be the best in the country. The golf course is the largest in North Korea. According to the authorities, 40 players use the course on a daily basis.

In 1994, Park Young-man, the course regular, told Australian journalist Eric Ellis that Kim Jong-il once scored a 34 on the course. Park continued that Kim achieved a birdie or better on every hole and had five holes-in-one. Later, this claim was further embellished to say that he had scored 11 holes in one, and that this was on the first round played at the course in 1987, and there were 17 bodyguards who witnessed it. It is not clear whether the exaggerated version was spread by the North Korean state or foreign news reporting. However, clarification within North Korea indicates the reported score was due to a discrepancy in recording methods. The scorer recorded the net score relative to par, e.g., 1 for bogey, 2 for double bogey, etc. Therefore the suggested score would be 34 over par or 106, still difficult to believe for a first time golfer.

The website of the DPRK Amateur Golf Open credits German player Claudio Consul with the course record, with a score of 71.

In 2018, major expansion projects were initiated on the golf course, including 9 new holes, and new building and lodging facilities.

== Scorecard ==
Pyongyang Golf Club
Tee	Rating/Slope	1	2	3	4	5	6	7	8	9	Out	10	11	12	13	14	15	16	17	18	In	Total
Back		340	180	380	340	510	340	140	340	530	3100	340	360	490	160	350	330	420	190	460	3100	6200m
Regular		320	150	360	320	480	320	120	320	510	2900	320	340	470	140	330	310	370	170	450	2900	5800m
Par		4	3	4	4	5	4	3	4	5	36	4	4	5	3	4	4	4	3	5	36	72
