= Eric Ellis (journalist) =

Eric Ellis is an Australian journalist who writes about the politics, economics and societies of South and South-East Asia.

== Biography ==
He has written for Fortune, Forbes, the Financial Times, Time, The Times, The Bulletin/Newsweek, The Spectator, Institutional Investor, Euromoney, The Sydney Morning Herald, The Age, Australian Financial Review and the International Herald Tribune.

He reported on the Bali bombings over 2002–03, which won him the 2003 Walkley Award for Excellence in Journalism for Coverage of the Asia-Pacific Region. He was a finalist for the 2006 Walkley Award for an investigative series from Poland and was also a finalist in the 1993 Walkley Awards for his reporting from China. In 2005 was short-listed for the British Business Journalist of the Year Awards for reporting from Afghanistan, where he has tracked its post 9-11 development. He was a finalist in the 2005 South Asian Journalists Association of North America awards for his reporting of the Sri Lankan tsunami for Fortune. In May 2007, a profile he prepared of Wendi Deng was refused publication in the Sydney Morning Herald. In February 2008, he was appointed an official observer of the Pakistan general elections.

In 1999, he was appointed the regional correspondent of Time magazine, based in Singapore, and covering regional economic and political topics, notably the emergence of the internet in Asia, and of independence in East Timor. He became Fortune's correspondent in South-East Asia in 2001, and wrote for that magazine until 2008. In 1996, he was posted to the United States as correspondent with the Australian Financial Review.
