= My First First Love =

2019 South Korean television series

- Promotional poster
- Hangul: 첫사랑은 처음이라서
- Lit.: Because It's My First Love
- RR: Cheotsarangeun cheoeumiraseo
- MR: Ch'ŏssarangŭn ch'ŏŭmirasŏ
- Genre: Romance; Coming of age
- Created by: Jung Hyun-jung
- Written by: Kim Ran
- Directed by: Oh Jin-seok
- Starring: Ji Soo; Jung Chae-yeon; Jung Jin-young; Choi Ri; Kang Tae-oh
- Country of origin: South Korea
- Original language: Korean
- No. of seasons: 2
- No. of episodes: 16

Production
- Executive producer: Lee Sang-baek
- Camera setup: Single camera
- Running time: 42–56 minutes
- Production company: AStory

Original release
- Network: Netflix
- Release: April 18 – July 26, 2019

Related
- My First Time

My First First Love (Korean: 첫사랑은 처음이라서) is a 2019 South Korean romance television series starring Ji Soo, Jung Chae-yeon and Jung Jin-young. The first season was released on Netflix on April 18, 2019. The second season was released on July 26, 2019.

The series is a reboot of the 2015 OnStyle drama My First Time, which was produced by the same production company. The latter's writer Jung Hyun-jung is credited as the series creator.

== Synopsis ==
The drama tells the story of five youths and their messy encounters with the concept of first love. Yun Tae-o is a college student whose friends — a college drop-out, a runaway family friend, and his long-time childhood friend — decide to unexpectedly move into his house due to their own individual reasonings. Now they must all learn to live together and learn to love.

== Cast ==
=== Main ===
- Ji Soo as Yun Tae-o (Note: Portrayed by Choi Min-ho (Shinee) in My First Time)
  - Kim Seul-woo as child Yun Tae-o
  - Kim Jung-chul as young Yun Tae-o

Tae-o has been best friends with Song-i since they were in elementary, and feels the constant need to take care of her. Because of this, he has always been conflicted about his feelings towards her, often having a secret on-and-off crush. He initially pursues a relationship with Ryu Se-hyeon.

- Jung Chae-yeon as Han Song-i (Note: Portrayed by Park So-dam in My First Time)
  - Choi Yu-ri as young Han Song-i

Song-i experiences the most hardship out of the entire group, as her father dies and her mother abandons her. She is evicted from her home after her father passes away, and is left homeless. She is best friends with Tae-o, and she initially understands her relationship with him as platonic. She is an architecture major. She develops a relationship at first with Seo Do-hyeon.

- Jung Jin-young as Seo Do-hyeon (Note: Portrayed by Kim Min-jae in My First Time; his original name there is Seo Ji-an)

A friend of Tae-o's from college. He focuses on finding a stable job and studying, rather than finding a girlfriend. Unlike Tae-o, he does not come from a wealthy family. He is the only one of the group to not live with Tae-o. He develops a relationship with Song-i. However, he then starts to feud with Tae-O over Song-i, thus ending their friendship for a brief period.

- Choi Ri as O Ga-rin (Note: Portrayed by Cho Hye-jung in My First Time)

Ga-rin and Tae-o's families are friends. She was born into an extremely wealthy family, and is an heiress to the Daebaek Group. Ga-rin wanted to experience her own independence so she ran away to Tae-o's house in Seoul. She develops a relationship with Hun later.

- Kang Tae-oh as Choe Hun (Note: Portrayed by Lee Yi-kyung in My First Time)

Hun has known Tae-o since elementary, but the two didn't become friends until college, before Hun dropped out. Like Tae-o, he comes from a well-off family, but he is financially cutoff by his father, a college professor. He continues to pursue his dream of becoming a musician/actor. He develops a relationship with Ga-rin later.

=== Recurring ===
- Hong Ji-yoon as Ryu Se-hyeon (Note: Portrayed by Eugene Jung in My First Time; was a main character there but became recurring in this series)

A beautiful art major who is 2 years older than Tae-o. He pursues a relationship with her after he mistakes her for being his blind date. She becomes jealous and rude to Song-i because of Tae-o.

- Yoon Da-hoon as Yun Jeong-gil, Tae-o's father (Note: Portrayed by Ahn Nae-sang in My First Time) and a landowner
- Park Soo-young as Do-hyeon's father, (Note: Portrayed by Jeong Man-sik in My First Time) a dumpling shop owner
- Jung Si-ah as Tae-o's step mother, Jeong-gil's wife who often clashes with Tae-o
- Yoon Bok-in as Song-i's mother, who abandons Song-i for a man.
- Jeon Soo-kyeong as Ga-rin's mother, the heiress of the Daebak Group
- Jo Seung-yeon as Choe Seok hwan, Hun's abusive father
- Oh Young-shil as Hun's mother
- Park Yu-rim as Choe Min-ah, Song-i's friend and an architecture major
- Lee Ju-eun as Song-i's friend
- Kim Jae-yong as Dae-geon, Song-i's former senior who now works for a famous architecture company.
- Jung Yoon-seok as Yun Yeong-ho, Tae-o's younger half-brother

== Episodes ==
=== Series overview ===
Season	Episodes	Originally released
1	8	April 18, 2019
2	8	July 26, 2019

=== Season 1 ===
No. overall	No. in season	Title	Directed by	Written by	Original release date
1	1	"A Close Friend – Who's Only Just a Friend"	Oh Jin-seok	Kim Ran	April 18, 2019
On his 20th birthday, Yun Tae-o convinces his father to let him live in his grandfather's house. He accepts on two conditions: he cannot invite girls to the house and his father will make random visits once a week. His father does not follow through with the latter, and although happy he is living on his own, Tae-o mentions his friends, Choe Hun and Seo Do-hyeon, have become a nuisance to his new house. Tae-o also has a secret crush on his best friend, Han Song-i, and makes the effort to always be there for her, especially after her father passes away. One day, Tae-o overhears a group of students asking Song-i if she has feelings for Tae-o, which she denies, and thus, upsets Tae-o. Furthermore, he mentions to Song-i that he has a blind date. Unlike Tae-o, Seo Do-hyeon focuses on finding a stable job, rather than finding a girlfriend, as he is not from a wealthy family. Meanwhile, Hun is kicked out and cut off financially by his father after learning that Hun is focusing on his music career rather than college. Meanwhile, a wealthy young woman named O Ga-rin sneaks out of the airport, possessing a note with Tae-o's name and address, in order to avoid visiting her mother for vacation. Do-hyeon happens to be witness to Song-i being evicted from her house after she is unable to reach her mother. Hun, Ga-rin, Song-i and Do-hyeon unexpectedly meet up with each other in front of Tae-o's house. Already late for his blind date, Tae-o becomes distracted by a beautiful young woman walking by.
2	2	"I Need a Room and You Have Many"	Oh Jin-seok	Kim Ran	April 18, 2019
Tae-o assumes the same woman he saw from earlier is Yu Se-yeon, his blind date. Meanwhile, Do-hyeon calls to tell him that Hun, Ga-rin, and Song-i are all at his house, and mentions how Song-i seems to be in trouble, and so Tae-o decides to leave the date. Hun and Ga-rin argue over who should live with Tae-o. Ga-rin destroys her cell phone after her mother attempts to call her. Unlike the others, however, Song-i withholds the truth behind why she came to Tae-o, thus, he encourages her to go home. Tae-o learns that the supposed "Yu Se-yeon" was not the real name of the woman he met earlier, even so, he becomes curious about who she really is. Song-i retrieves her father's name plate from her old house, and runs into the same woman from Tae-o's date. She is the daughter of the new homeowners, but acts rudely with Song-i. At the library, Song-i avoids telling Do-hyeon where she slept for the night. Meanwhile, Tae-o discovers his mysterious blind date is actually Ryu Se-hyeon, not Yu-Se-yeon. Se-hyeon points out that he also assumed that she was his blind date, but Tae-o calls it fate since they met each other unexpectedly, and they both have an interest in filmmaking. Do-hyeon later discovers Song-i sleeping in the library. Tae-o discovers that Song-i is homeless after stopping by her house. Do-hyeon helps Song-i find another place to sleep. Song-i finally receives a call from her mother, who tells her she is not coming home any time soon. Song-i takes a walk to a bridge and uses a telephone for the suicide hotline, which leads the police to show up and take her back to the station. Do-hyeon shows up at the station, after Song-i disappeared earlier, and almost lies about being her guardian until Tae-o shows up, claiming to be her guardian.
3	3	"Fretting about Someone"	Oh Jin-seok	Kim Ran	April 18, 2019
Tae-o and Song-i apologize to each other after he admits he was hurt that she did not tell him about her problems. Tae-o is still indecisive about allowing Hun and Ga-rin to live with him, but states that it's different with Song-i. Meanwhile, Song-i begins to suspect that she may have feelings for Do-hyeon. Tae-o later mentions to Do-hyeon that he wishes Song-i would find a boyfriend, as he cannot always be there for her, especially since he is planning to pursue a relationship with Se-hyeon. Do-hyeon and Song-i have a private lunch together. Hun brings Ga-rin to work with him, as an extra. She decides to learn decision-making skills from Hun after he is berated by his boss. Song-i (still unaware of her connection to Tae-o) runs into Se-hyeon during a group project, and learns that she is not into committed relationships, and thus, may have multi boyfriends. Meanwhile, Tae-o has dinner with his parents, and his stepmother gossips Song-i's mother abandoning her family and possibly having a new boyfriend. Tae-o warns his parents not to talk about it in front of Song-i. When Tae-o arrives back home, he overhears Song-i on the phone admitting that she may have a crush on someone (referring to Do-hyeon) but Tae-o assumes she is talking about him. Before he can leave, Song-i discovers him nearby and then awkwardly asks if he happened to "hear everything?"
4	4	"The Guy You Told Me About"	Oh Jin-seok	Kim Ran	April 18, 2019
Tae-o pretends to not know that Song-i has a crush on someone, but assuming that her crush is on him leads him into having a dream where he kisses Song-i. He begins to act different around her, initially refusing to give her a ride to campus but then changing his mind after he sees her riding a very crowded bus. Ga-rin goes with Hun to an audition and she reacts like a fangirl upon hearing him sing. Both are aware that they are talking about Song-i when Tae-o admits that he may have to reject someone whom he thinks has feelings for him and Do-hyeon admits that he has developed feelings for someone he recently met, much to Tae-o's surprise. Song-i starts sleeping in Tae-o's old tent in front yard of the house due to Ga-rin's loud snoring. Song-i suggests that they invite Do-hyeon after Ga-rin offers to plan a party as a thank you to Hun, Song-i and especially Tae-o. Tae-o is interviewed about joining the film club but can only join if he makes a short video that can make Se-hyeon smile. Tae-o hesitates to invite Se-hyeon over his house due to his new roommates. During the party on the rooftop of Tae-o's house, Do-hyeon asks Song-i to spend some time together before she gets too busy with her upcoming internship. A drunk Song-i admits that she has a crush on someone, to the group, but does not say who it is.
5	5	"Saying I Like You"	Oh Jin-seok	Kim Ran	April 18, 2019
Tae-o becomes embarrassed after admitting to Song-i that he knows about her crush, but that he wrongly assumed it was him. Song-i states that she knows the difference between how she feels about her crush and how she feels about Tae-o. Do-hyeon and Song-i later meet up to watch a movie and have dinner. Meanwhile, the group are trying to cheer up Hun after he doesn't get a call back from the audition. However, things become tense when Tae-o's father confronts Do-hyeon's father about the rent money he seems to owe him. Even though Tae-o tells his father to stop, he leaves only after he confront Song-i about the money her mother still owes him. Song-i begins work at the internship, during which she encounters Lee Dae-geon, a graduate student who happens to be the supervisor. He acts "consistently" sleazy with Song-i and her friend. On her way home, Song-i lies about not being able to meet up with Do-hyeon at the bus stop, assuming he is too busy at work, as she doesn't want to bother him, but he happens to see her meet up with Tae-o at the bus stop after they learn that Hun actually did get the role from his audition, news that they plan to surprise him with, later on. The next day, Do-hyeon assures Song-i that she doesn't need to be so considerate about him (i.e. lying about not being able to meet him at the bus stop) and then asks if she and Tae-o have ever had feelings for each other.
6	6	"Confession Day"	Oh Jin-seok	Kim Ran	April 18, 2019
Tae-o finally asks Se-hyeon to be his girlfriend. Ga-rin buys a new cell phone for herself and Hun before she starts work at her new part-time job. Tae-o finally decides to talk to Do-hyeon since it has been awkward after the confrontation between their fathers. Tae-o is surprised to learn how serious Do-hyeon seems to be about asking out his crush. Meanwhile, Tae-o's short video is successful in making Se-hyeon smile. Hun discovers that he was only cast as an understudy. Se-hyeon admits to Tae-o that she really likes him, which makes him happy. While home alone, Hun is visited by two bodyguards (sent by Ga-rin's mother) offering a large reward in exchange for Ga-rin's return, thus, Hun discovers that Ga-rin comes a from very wealthy family. Song-i begins to tutor Yeong-ho, Tae-o's younger half-brother. Do-hyeon asks Mr. Yun, aka Tae-o's father, if he can do maintenance on the building he owns, in exchange for him not raising the rent on his father's shop, to which Mr. Yun agrees to. Meanwhile, Se-hyeon kisses Tae-o after he discovers that she lives in Song-i's old house. Do-hyeon finally asks Song-i to be his girlfriend.
7	7	"A Rain Shower"	Oh Jin-seok	Kim Ran	April 18, 2019
Although they are happy now that they are officially dating, Song-i suggests to Do-hyeon that they keep it a secret from Tae-o, for now. During her group project, Song-i learns that one of the male students is doing Se-hyeon's work for her, before learning that Tae-o is dating Se-hyeon. Song-i later discovers that Se-hyeon has also convinced Tae-oh to do some of her work for her as well. Song-i warns him of Se-hyeon's manipulation but he justifies her actions when he admits they are entering a film contest together. Financially broke and feeling like he is getting nowhere in his career, Hun struggles to decide whether or not to return Ga-rin to her mother, in order to get the reward money. Song-i invites Do-hyeon to go with her on a one-day trip to Gangneung for her field report. Back at the house, Tae-o warns Song-i about the rumors of Lee Dae-geon (the supervisor from her internship), of how he would do things to girls after getting them drunk. Tae-o slowly begins to realize his feelings for Song-i, again, upon discovering that she has a boyfriend (unaware that she is dating Do-hyeon). Se-hyeon learns that Tae-o's mother died when he was young, and she suggests that he make a video of him growing up alongside his parents for the film contest, but Tae-o says he will think about it. After her date with Do-hyeon, Tae-o finds Song-i caught in the rain, barefoot, and without an umbrella. He worries she will be heartbroken by her new boyfriend, and advises her breakup with him. A thunderstorm leaves Song-i, Ga-rin, and Hun scared and so Tae-o stays up with them to watch TV, during which he begins to show his feelings for Song-i, again.
8	8	"Turning Point"	Oh Jin-seok	Kim Ran	April 18, 2019
Tae-o becomes upset after learning that Song-i is planning a day trip with her boyfriend to Gangneung, whom he does not trust. Hun learns from another understudy that he may be getting fired soon. Hun comes home depressed and so, Tae-o suggest that they should all (including Do-hyeon & Se-hyeon) go to Gangneung with Song-i and her new boyfriend. Tae-o rents a large car so they can all drive to Gangneung together. Tae-o warns his friends not to reveal that they all live with him to Se-hyeon. Tae-o tells Do-hyeon about the night he found Song-i in the rain (after her date with Do-hyeon) and that he does not like Song-i's boyfriend. Song-i discovers that Se-hyeon may have another boyfriend, other than Tae-o. Se-hyeon discovers that Tae-o's friends are living with him after talking with Ga-rin. Hun becomes depressed after he receives a call from the production company and is fired. Hesitant to tell Tae-o about Se-hyeon's deceit, Song-i warns him not to trust Se-hyeon. When they are alone together, Do-hyeon admits to Song-i that he feels jealous about her closeness with Tae-o, but the two finally kiss after Song-i refers to him as her "love story". Unaware that he is nearby, Tae-o witnesses their first kiss and realizes that it has an effect on him, emotionally.

=== Season 2 ===
No. overall	No. in season	Title	Directed by	Written by	Original release date
9	1	"The Real Reason"	Oh Jin-seok	Kim Ran	July 26, 2019
Do-hyeon and Song-i are happily dating, however, Song-i feels she has missed her opportunity to tell Tae-o the truth about them. Tae-o is already aware of their relationship, and although he gives Song-i multiple chances to tell him the truth, she hesitates to do so, making him frustrated. Tae-o also mentions to Song-i that Se-hyeon has been distant with him. Meanwhile, Hun is still struggling to find a job, leading him into giving Ga-rin's location to her mother in exchange for reward money. Ga-rin becomes so stressed over having revealed to Se-hyeon that she, Hun, and Song-i are all living with Tae-o, leading her to suddenly blurt it out to the entire household later on. Song-i is lured into Dae-geon's car, an older graduate student, after he "mistakenly" takes her phone as his own. Dae-geon takes Song-i to the Observatory on campus. Feeling uncomfortable, Song-i sends a text to Do-hyeon for him to come to the Observatory. However, he does not see the message because he is at work, and so, right before her phone battery dies, Song-i sends the same message to Tae-o. Dae-geon makes unwanted advances towards Song-i, but she refuses him. Tae-o arrives to help Song-i, realizing what he attempted to do with Song-i, Tae-o attacks Dae-geon, but Song-i pulls him away. After work, Do-hyeon reads Song-i's messages and rushes to Tae-o's house when she does not answer his phone call. Tae-o reveals that he is fully aware of Song-i's relationship with Do-hyeon. Tae-o has a talk with Do-hyeon about being protective of Song-i if he should ever hurt her in any way. After Se-hyeon reveals she is aware that Tae-o's friends are living with him, she surprises Tae-o when she tells him that she wants Song-i to move out of the house.
10	2	"His Priority"	Oh Jin-seok	Kim Ran	July 26, 2019
Se-hyeon becomes upset and gives Tae-o an ultimatum after he refuses to kick Song-i out of the house. After learning the water will be cut off at home, Do-hyeon talks with Tae-o and invites himself to spend the night at his house with Song-i. Se-hyeon tells Song-i that her close friendship with Tae-o affects the people around her (referring to herself and Do-hyeon) Meanwhile, Hun is feeling guilty after giving the location of Ga-rin's part-time job to her mother in exchange for the reward money (initially, he only receives half of the reward). He decides to go and help Ga-rin evade the people her mother sent to look for her at work, but he eventually tells her the truth. Tae-o watches as Do-hyeon prepares dinner for Song-i at the house. Song-i mentions the idea of her moving out, but Tae-o refuses to let her think she is an issue for him and Se-hyeon. Ga-rin and Hun come home and reveal to the group that he has betrayed her trust; she begins packing her things, and with Hun following behind her, he tells Tae-o that if she leaves, so will he. Hun helps Ga-rin find a place to stay for the night (a Comic book store). Tae-o becomes bothered when Song-i and Do-hyeon spend some alone time together. The next day, Ga-rin comes back and decides to stay, and thus, so will Hun. Although she is still mad at him, Ga-rin tells Song-i that she will eventually overcome it. Song-i decides to tell Tae-o that she is moving out, much to his dismay, but all he can think about is how, if only he could be honest about his feelings towards her.
11	3	"Five Degrees of Separation"	Oh Jin-seok	Kim Ran	July 26, 2019
12	4	"Alone, Together"	Oh Jin-seok	Kim Ran	July 26, 2019
Tae-o and Song-i reach a rest stop to her mother's house, and although Song-i tries to get Tae-o to leave, he is persistent, telling her that he's going to go no matter what. They reach her mother's house, and Song-i expresses her frustration by throwing a brick at her mom's house window. Song-i's mom and her boyfriend come out, and seeing Song-i, her mom tells her why she really left. Song-i's mom was in love with a baker, and she had to choose to leave Song-i or go with the baker, and she chose the Baker. After, Song-i becomes so distraught she disowns her mother and chooses to sleep on a bench. However, Tae-o books a hotel room so Song-i could sleep in a real bed, and the next day they depart. However, Do-hyeon, worried and regretful about Song-i, picks her up and they depart. But it is revealed that Song-i did have feelings for Tae-o, however she keeps it hidden. Meanwhile, Hun gets a call from his dad, who is angered that Hun stayed at Tae-o's house. But Hun's dad gruffly invites him for sushi with a business colleague, who tells Hun about a play in which he and his dad will get paid a huge sum of money. However, Hun's dad is so eager to continue the business ties with his colleague, Hun angrily cuts ties from his father and leaves
13	5	"Unspeakable Secrets"	Oh Jin-seok	Kim Ran	July 26, 2019
14	6	"Something Only I Can Do"	Oh Jin-seok	Kim Ran	July 26, 2019
15	7	"Watching Her Watching Him"	Oh Jin-seok	Kim Ran	July 26, 2019
16	8	"My First First Love"	Oh Jin-seok	Kim Ran	July 26, 2019
Due to financial purposes, Do-hyeon and his father sold the restaurant and are now getting ready to pack. Tae-o and Do-hyeon talk about Song-i before he bids him farewell, making him take care before walking away. Meanwhile, Ga-rin's mom figures out that she has been living with Tae-o, and demands she returns home immediately. She at first refuses, but later agrees to go back, as long as if she gets to take a break. While on a walkway, Do-Hyeon reminisces about Song-i, and the time when they dated, before leaving the group. Song-i gets a job interview, so she and Tae-o spend the day finding outfits to try on. She then sees a brown bag in her art room, and sees its from Do-hyeon, giving her a farewell gift before leaving. The last shot is of Song-i and Tae-o sharing a kiss, as they smile and laugh

== Production ==
The series is pre-produced; filming began in September 2018 and ended in January 2019.
