= Park Sung-woo =

Park Sung-woo, Park Seong-woo or Park Seong-u may refer to:

- Park Sung-woo (badminton) (born 1971), South Korean badminton player
- Park Sung-woo (artist) (born 1972), South Korean manhwa artist
- Park Sung-woo (actor) (born 1988), South Korean actor
