= Crash Landing on You =

2019–2020 South Korean television series

- Promotional poster
- Hangul: 사랑의 불시착
- Hanja: 사랑의 不時着
- Lit.: Love's Emergency Landing
- RR: Sarangui bulsichak
- MR: Sarangŭi pulsich'ak
- Genre: Romantic comedy
- Written by: Park Ji-eun
- Directed by: Lee Jung-hyo
- Starring: Hyun Bin; Son Ye-jin; Kim Jung-hyun; Seo Ji-hye
- Opening theme: "Sigriswil (Opening title ver.)" by Kim Kyung-hee
- Composer: Nam Hye-seung
- Country of origin: South Korea
- Original language: Korean
- No. of episodes: 16

Production
- Production locations: South Korea; Switzerland; Mongolia
- Running time: 70–110 minutes
- Production companies: Studio Dragon; Culture Depot
- Budget: US$20 million

Original release
- Network: tvN
- Release: December 14, 2019 – February 16, 2020

Crash Landing on You (Korean: 사랑의 불시착) is a 2019 South Korean romantic comedy television series written by Park Ji-eun, directed by Lee Jung-hyo, and starring Hyun Bin, Son Ye-jin, Kim Jung-hyun, and Seo Ji-hye. The series follows Yoon Se-ri, a South Korean chaebol heiress who is swept across the border by a tornado while paragliding and lands in North Korea. She meets Ri Jeong-hyeok, a captain in the Korean People's Army, who hides and protects her. Despite the political division between their countries, they develop a romantic relationship. A subplot involves Gu Seung-jun, a fraudster seeking refuge in the North, and Seo Dan, a musician and Jeong-hyeok's fiancée.

Park Ji-eun conceived Crash Landing on You based on an incident in which a South Korean actress drifted into North Korean waters. The script draws thematic inspiration from the paradox of the Korean division, as well as literary works such as The Wonderful Wizard of Oz and The Little Prince. Produced by Studio Dragon and Culture Depot with a budget of approximately US$20 million, the series was filmed over six months. The production used live-shooting, and filming took place in Switzerland, Mongolia, and South Korea. Nam Hye-seung composed and produced the original soundtrack.

Comprising 16 episodes, Crash Landing on You aired on tvN from December 14, 2019, to February 16, 2020, and was distributed globally by Netflix. The series received critical acclaim for its cinematography, performances, and the chemistry between the lead actors, as well as its portrayal of life in North Korea. It faced domestic criticism; the Christian Liberty Unification Party accused the show of violating the National Security Act by "glamorizing" North Korea, while others criticized its use of product placement. North Korean state media condemned the series as a "provocative" distortion. Commercially, it was a major success, achieving a nationwide rating of 21.7% for its finale and becoming the highest-rated drama in tvN's history at the time.

Portraying North Korea's daily life against the backdrop of the peninsula's ideological division, Crash Landing on You was a major success of the Korean Wave, particularly in Japan; it drove sales for featured brands and increased tourism to its filming locations in Switzerland. The series also circulated in North Korea via the black market, where a line of dialogue from the show became a trend. The series was adapted into a musical and received numerous accolades, including the Grand Prize for Hyun Bin at the 7th APAN Star Awards and multiple nominations at the 56th Baeksang Arts Awards. For her contributions to cultural understanding through the series, the Ministry of Unification named Park Ji-eun the "Unification Education Person of the Year".

== Cast and characters ==
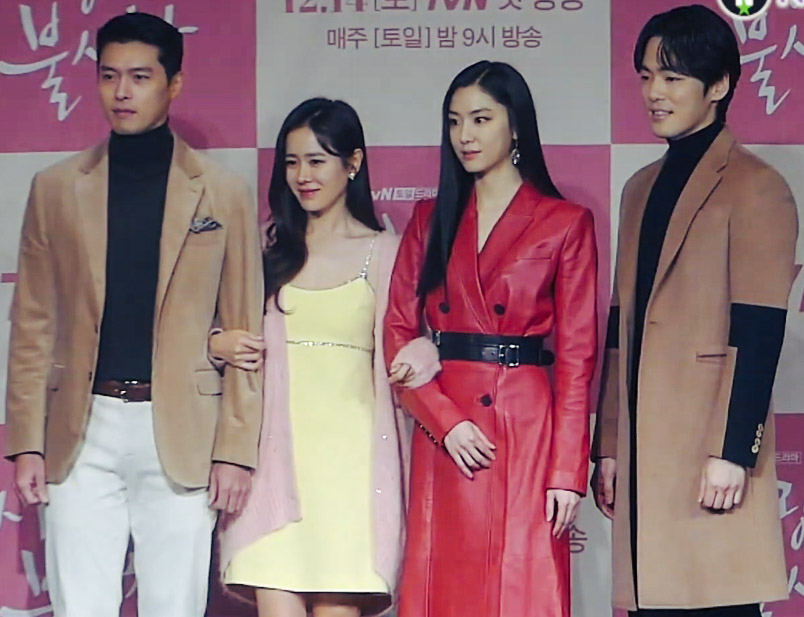
The four main cast members of Crash Landing on You. From left to right: Hyun Bin as Captain Ri Jeong-hyeok, Son Ye-jin as Yoon Se-ri, Seo Ji-hye as Seo Dan, and Kim Jung-hyun as Gu Seung-jun.

=== Main ===
- Hyun Bin as Ri Jeong-hyeok:

A captain in the Korean People's Army (KPA) commanding Company Five in the Korean Demilitarized Zone (DMZ). He is the youngest son of the Director of the General Political Bureau of the KPA. Jeong-hyeok is described as having a South Korean-style tsundere personality: cold, principled, and uncompromising on the outside, yet endearing and occasionally "adorable" on the inside. His life is upended when Yoon Se-ri, a South Korean chaebol heiress, accidentally paraglides into North Korean territory. Although regulations require her execution, he chooses to hide and protect her. Before his military service, Jeong-hyeok was a talented pianist studying in Switzerland. During his time there, he briefly crossed paths with Se-ri, though they did not formally meet. Following the mysterious death of his older brother, he was forced to give up his musical career, return to North Korea to enlist, and investigate the incident.

- Son Ye-jin as Yoon Se-ri:

A third-generation South Korean heiress and the illegitimate daughter of Yoon Jeung-pyeong, the chairman of Queens Group. Depicted as a high-profile celebrity known for her beauty and business acumen, she established a successful fashion brand and was named successor to her father's conglomerate. While she is paragliding, a tornado sweeps her across the border into North Korea, where she encounters Captain Ri Jeong-hyeok. Initially a steely pragmatist who prioritizes her career over emotion and remains undaunted by threats, she softens during her time in the North as she struggles with her predicament. As she grows closer to Jeong-hyeok, she desires his happiness. Se-ri previously contemplated suicide in Switzerland but found the will to live after hearing Jeong-hyeok play the piano, a connection she later recognizes as "destiny".

- Kim Jung-hyun as Gu Seung-jun:

A British-Korean businessman and former fiancé of Se-ri. Depicted as charming and persuasive but unscrupulous, he embezzles a massive sum from Se-ri's brother, Yoon Se-hyeong. To evade the National Police Agency and Interpol, he flees to North Korea, intending to hide for ten years until the statute of limitations expires. In Pyongyang, he develops a romantic interest in Seo Dan, though she initially rejects him due to her engagement to Jeong-hyeok.

- Seo Ji-hye as Seo Dan:

A cellist from an upper-class background in Pyongyang and Jeong-hyeok's fiancée. Characterized as a strong, confident, and elegant woman, she fully expects to marry Jeong-hyeok until the appearance of Se-ri forces her into a complicated love triangle. She is initially devoted to Jeong-hyeok and rejects Seung-jun's advances. She eventually opens her heart to Seung-jun after spending time with him and receiving his earnest advice.

=== Supporting ===
==== North Korean soldiers in Company Five ====
- Yang Kyung-won as Pyo Chi-su: A sergeant-major in Company Five. Despite his short temper and hostility toward Se-ri due to his prejudices against South Korea, he is kind-hearted and loyal.
- Lee Shin-young as Park Kwang-beom: A staff sergeant noted for his good looks and quiet demeanor. He is respectful of and loyal to Jeong-hyeok.
- Yoo Su-bin as Kim Ju-meok: A soldier fascinated by the Korean Wave (Hallyu). His knowledge of South Korean dramas allows him to bridge the cultural gap by translating Se-ri's slang for his comrades.
- Tang Jun-sang as Geum Eun-dong: The youngest member of the unit. He is the sole breadwinner for his family and bonds closely with Se-ri. With nine years of military service remaining, he frequently expresses longing for his mother.

==== People in the North Korean Forces ====
- Oh Man-seok as Cho Cheol-gang: A lieutenant commander in the Ministry of State Security and the series' main antagonist. A former kotjebi, he rose through the ranks via bribery and corruption. Cheol-gang orchestrates criminal operations including drug trafficking, illegal excavation in the DMZ, and harboring fugitives. He murders those who threaten to expose him, including Jeong-hyeok's brother.
- Kim Young-min as Jung Man-bok: A wiretapper assigned to monitor Jeong-hyeok, known by the moniker gwittaegi (귀때기, 'The Rat'). Coerced into working for Cheol-gang to protect his family, he previously provided the intelligence that led to the death of Ri Mu-hyeok, Jeong-hyeok's brother and Man-bok's former benefactor. Burdened by guilt, he ultimately allies with Jeong-hyeok and Se-ri to bring down Cheol-gang.
- Kim Young-pil as Senior Colonel Kim Ryong-hae: Jeong-hyeok's superior, who is easily influenced by his wife, Ma Young-ae.

==== People around Ri Jeong-hyeok ====
- Jun Gook-hwan as Ri Chung-ryeol: Jeong-hyeok's father and the Director of the General Political Bureau. A vice-marshal, he is a calculating figure known in the military as the "Old Fox" (늙은 여우).
- Jung Ae-ri as Kim Yun-hui: Jeong-hyeok's composed mother, who generally defers to her husband, except regarding matters involving her children.

==== People around Yoon Se-ri ====
- Nam Kyung-eup as Yoon Jeung-pyeong: Se-ri's father and the chairman of Queens Group. After being imprisoned for financial crimes, he steps down and names Se-ri his successor, trusting her competence over his other children.
- Bang Eun-jin as Han Jeong-yeon: Se-ri's stepmother. Their relationship is strained by an incident in which Jeong-yeon, embittered by her husband's infidelity, abandoned a young Se-ri at a beach, leaving lasting emotional scars.
- Choi Dae-hoon as Yoon Se-jun: Se-ri's eldest brother. He is portrayed as clumsy, hot-tempered, and immature.
- Hwang Woo-seul-hye as Do Hye-ji: Se-jun's wife and a former actress. She married Se-jun for his wealth and maneuvers to secure his succession as chairman.
- Park Hyung-soo as Yoon Se-hyeong: Se-ri's older brother. He resents Se-ri's appointment as heir. Upon learning of her survival in North Korea, he actively hinders her return to preserve his claim to the family fortune.
- Yoon Ji-min as Go Sang-ah: Se-hyeong's ambitious wife, who covets Se-ri's company. She conspires to keep Se-ri trapped in the North.
- Ko Kyu-pil as Hong Chang-sik: Se-ri's anxious team manager, who, along with Su-chan, tirelessly searches for her.
- Im Chul-soo as Park Su-chan: An insurance agent who desperately tries to prove Se-ri is alive.

==== People around Gu Seung-jun ====
- Hong Woo-jin as Cheon Su-bok: A corrupt North Korean official who facilitates illegal entry and residence for fugitives.
- Yoon Sang-hoon as Manager Oh: A broker who connects Seung-jun with the North Korean safe haven service.

==== People around Seo Dan ====
- Jang Hye-jin as Ko Myeong-eun: Seo Dan's mother and the owner of Pyongyang's largest department store. She is fiercely protective of her daughter and eager to see her married to Jeong-hyeok. Her interactions with her younger brother provide comic relief.
- Park Myung-hoon as Ko Myeong-seok: Seo Dan's uncle and a major general in the Ministry of State Security. He secretly supports Jeong-hyeok and is frequently embarrassed by his sister's theatrical behavior.

==== North Korean Village ====
- Kim Sun-young as Na Wol-suk: The head of the village people's unit. She is tough and outspoken, initially resisting Se-ri's influence.
- Kim Jung-nan as Ma Young-ae: The Senior Colonel's wife and the influential leader of the village women. Se-ri quickly wins her favor through flattery.
- Cha Chung-hwa as Yang Ok-geum: A hairdresser and former news announcer. She is Wol-suk's close friend.
- Jang So-yeon as Hyun Myeong-sun: Jung Man-bok's quiet and reserved wife.
- Lim Sung-mi as Geum-soon: A vendor at the jangmadang who secretly sells South Korean goods.

=== Special appearances ===
List of actors and characters who made special appearances and were acknowledged in the closing credits:

- Jung Kyung-ho as Cha Sang-woo: A Hallyu star and Se-ri's former secret boyfriend.
- Ha Seok-jin as Ri Mu-hyeok: Jeong-hyeok's late brother. He was murdered by Cheol-gang in a staged accident after uncovering the latter's corruption.
- Park Sung-woong as a North Korean taxi driver
- Na Young-hee as a North Korean wedding dress shop owner
- Kim Soo-hyun as Won Ryu-hwan / Bang Dong-gu: A North Korean sleeper agent in Seoul. He reprises his role from the 2013 film Secretly, Greatly.
- Kim Sook as a North Korean fortune teller
- Choi Ji-woo as herself

== Episodes ==
No.	Title	Original release date	South Korea viewers (millions)
1	"Episode 1"	December 14, 2019	1.508
Yoon Se-ri is a successful South Korean businesswoman who has a strained relationship with her family. During a dinner, her father, the chairman of Queens Group, announces that Se-ri will inherit the company instead of her incompetent brothers. The following day, Se-ri goes paragliding to test a new product for her own company, Seri's Choice. A tornado blows her off course, causing her to crash. Upon waking, she encounters Ri Jeong-hyeok, a captain in the North Korean Army. Realizing she has landed in the Demilitarized Zone, Se-ri attempts to escape Jeong-hyeok and his squad, Company Five. Unknowingly running deeper into North Korea, she arrives at a village and grasps the gravity of her situation upon seeing the local lifestyle. As a military truck approaches, Jeong-hyeok pulls her into hiding. In the epilogue, Jeong-hyeok lowers his weapon and smiles as he watches Se-ri struggling in a tree, attempting to use her walkie-talkie.
2	"Episode 2"	December 15, 2019	1.773
Jeong-hyeok decides to hide Se-ri in his home. Businessman Gu Seung-jun, fleeing the fallout of an embezzlement scheme involving Se-ri's brother, Yoon Se-hyeong, seeks refuge in North Korea. In the South, Se-ri's family vies for succession rather than worrying about her safety. Se-ri adjusts to the modest lifestyle and bonds with Jeong-hyeok's squad. Jeong-hyeok travels to Pyongyang to investigate his brother's death; there, he is revealed to be the son of the director of the General Political Bureau. While he is away, Cho Cheol-gang, a corrupt officer and Jeong-hyeok's superior, raids the house and discovers Se-ri. Jeong-hyeok returns and declares that Se-ri is his fiancée. The epilogue reveals that Se-ri had traveled to Switzerland seeking assisted suicide after being disowned, but was rejected. While watching paragliders, she stood next to Jeong-hyeok, who was then a piano student.
3	"Episode 3"	December 21, 2019	1.894
To secure Se-ri's release, Jeong-hyeok claims she is a covert Division 11 operative. Remaining unconvinced, Cheol-gang tasks wiretapper Jung Man-bok with bugging Jeong-hyeok's home to find evidence against his family. Man-bok, haunted by his past, had previously been coerced by Cheol-gang into playing a role in the death of Jeong-hyeok's brother, Ri Mu-hyeok. Meanwhile, Jeong-hyeok's fiancée, Seo Dan, returns from her studies in Russia and catches the eye of Seung-jun. As Se-ri's family in the South plots a corporate takeover in her absence, Jeong-hyeok's attempt to smuggle her out by sea is thwarted by a coast guard interception. The epilogue shows Jeong-hyeok following Se-ri's instructions to speak kind words to a tomato plant she gave him. He hesitates before whispering the word "piano".
4	"Episode 4"	December 22, 2019	2.225
Due to a maritime security order, a restless Se-ri attempts to paraglide back home, only to be stopped by Jeong-hyeok, who warns her of imminent detection. He helps her evade Cheol-gang's search. In Seoul, Chairman Yoon hands management rights to his second son, Se-hyeong, angering his eldest son, Se-jun. Se-ri's strained relationship with her stepmother is also shown. In the village, Se-ri integrates with the local housewives. Dan encounters Seung-jun again; he gives her a ride to the military village while flirting, though she rebuffs him. Jeong-hyeok later finds a lost Se-ri in a marketplace by using a scented candle to guide her. The epilogue reveals that in Switzerland, Jeong-hyeok and Dan crossed paths with Se-ri as she was preparing to jump from a bridge. Jeong-hyeok asked Se-ri to take a photograph of him and Dan, inadvertently saving her life.
5	"Episode 5"	December 28, 2019	2.210
Upon arriving at Jeong-hyeok's house, Dan finds him with Se-ri. Meanwhile, Se-hyeong discovers Seung-jun's whereabouts in North Korea and bribes his broker to betray him. To get Se-ri out of the country, Jeong-hyeok devises a new plan to fly her to Europe. Although Cheol-gang catches wind of the scheme, he lacks the specifics; despite interrogating the squad, he is unable to break them thanks to Jeong-hyeok's protection. En route to Pyongyang, a power outage leaves Jeong-hyeok and Se-ri stranded overnight. They eventually reach a hotel where Seung-jun is staying. Seung-jun meets Se-ri and pulls her into an elevator, a scene witnessed by Jeong-hyeok. The epilogue shows Se-ri breaking up with former boyfriends. One remarks that she will one day understand what it is like to wait for someone. In the present, she finds herself waiting for Jeong-hyeok.
6	"Episode 6"	December 29, 2019	2.414
Jealous, Jeong-hyeok confronts Seung-jun. Dan arrives at the hotel and is furious to find Jeong-hyeok outside Se-ri's room. Seung-jun, pursued by Se-hyeong's men, strikes a deal to keep Se-ri in the North in exchange for his own safety and money. Jeong-hyeok's father formalizes his son's marriage to Dan by setting a wedding date. Seung-jun gives Cheol-gang a photo of Se-ri, and Cheol-gang agrees to stop her departure to bring about the downfall of Jeong-hyeok's family. En route to Sunan International Airport, Se-ri is ambushed by Cheol-gang's armored trucks. Jeong-hyeok arrives to protect her and is critically wounded while shielding her from gunfire. The epilogue reveals that Jeong-hyeok had secretly prepared for the possibility of an attack, promising to protect Se-ri at all costs.
7	"Episode 7"	January 11, 2020	2.510
Se-ri misses her flight to drive Jeong-hyeok to the hospital and donates blood to save him. Cheol-gang attempts to arrest Jeong-hyeok at the hospital, but Jeong-hyeok's father intervenes. Realizing Jeong-hyeok's high-ranking background, Se-ri feels unsafe and calls Seung-jun, who convinces her to stay with him for Jeong-hyeok's safety. In the South, Se-ri is declared legally dead. Dan confronts Jeong-hyeok about Se-ri's true identity; he confesses his feelings for Se-ri and asks to break off their engagement. The epilogue reveals that Se-ri had been searching for the pianist who played a song she heard in Switzerland, as the melody gave her the strength to live.
8	"Episode 8"	January 12, 2020	3.043
Jeong-hyeok sneaks out of the hospital to find Se-ri. Seung-jun proposes a fake marriage to Se-ri to help her leave the country. When Jeong-hyeok finds them, Se-ri tries to drive him away with harsh words for his own safety but quickly chases after him. They spend the night in an abandoned school due to a blizzard. Cheol-gang tortures Seung-jun to find Se-ri. Dan visits Jeong-hyeok's father. Back home, Se-ri and Jeong-hyeok share a warm Christmas. Se-ri pawns Seung-jun's ring to buy Mu-hyeok's watch. She is kidnapped and calls Jeong-hyeok in distress, confessing her love before a gunshot is heard. The epilogue shows that while Se-ri once considered Christmas meaningless, she now happily decorates a tree and wraps a gift for Jeong-hyeok.
9	"Episode 9"	January 18, 2020	2.941
Jeong-hyeok is arrested for assaulting Cheol-gang. Man-bok's son finds the watch and gives it to his father. It is revealed that Jeong-hyeok's father kidnapped Se-ri to protect her. Se-ri, unaware of his identity, takes the blame to protect Jeong-hyeok, an act of sincerity that moves his mother to let her stay. Upon his release, Jeong-hyeok reunites with Se-ri at his family home, where he reveals he was the composer of the song she heard in Switzerland. Dan opens up to Seung-jun about her unrequited love. Jeong-hyeok's father arranges for Se-ri to return to the South via the DMZ. At the border, the couple shares a tearful farewell. The epilogue shows Se-ri rearranging the books on Jeong-hyeok's shelf so the first syllables of the titles spell out "I love you, Ri Jeong-hyeok".
10	"Episode 10"	January 19, 2020	3.927
Se-ri returns and shocks her employees and family, preventing her sister-in-law Sang-ah from taking control of her company. Despite her return to luxury, she feels empty and misses Jeong-hyeok. In the North, Man-bok confesses the truth about Mu-hyeok's death to Jeong-hyeok and provides the watch as evidence. Cheol-gang is sentenced to life imprisonment but escapes and flees to the South, vowing to kill Se-ri. Seung-jun advises Dan to move on. To protect Se-ri, Jeong-hyeok sneaks into Seoul, where he reunites with a stunned Se-ri. The epilogue reveals that Jeong-hyeok's father dispatched Man-bok and Company Five to the South to bring Jeong-hyeok back. They are overwhelmed by modern Seoul and meet Dong-gu, a North Korean sleeper agent.
11	"Episode 11"	February 1, 2020	3.726
Jeong-hyeok explains that he traveled to Seoul to protect Se-ri from Cheol-gang. To keep him safe, Se-ri hides him in her apartment. In the North, the arrest of Cheol-gang's accomplices leaves Seung-jun vulnerable. Although offered a chance to flee the country, Seung-jun instead seeks refuge with Dan at her apartment. The North Korean soldiers struggle to adjust to life in Seoul. Cheol-gang attempts to lure Jeong-hyeok away to ambush Se-ri in a parking garage, though his plot ultimately fails. The epilogue shows Dan meeting Se-ri in Switzerland in the past. Following Se-ri's advice, Dan eats chocolates to calm her anger after seeing Jeong-hyeok looking at Se-ri.
12	"Episode 12"	February 2, 2020	4.782
Cheol-gang utilizes a network of defectors to operate in Seoul. The squad and Man-bok reunite with Jeong-hyeok and Se-ri at an event hosted by her company. Seung-jun reveals to Dan that he conned Se-ri's brother to avenge his father; the two grow closer. Se-ri invites the squad to her home. Sang-ah provides Cheol-gang with Se-ri's location. On Se-ri's birthday, she returns to a dark apartment and fears the worst, but it is a surprise party thrown by Jeong-hyeok and the squad. The epilogue reveals that Jeong-hyeok found Se-ri's old voice recorder. Listening to her "will" recorded in Switzerland, he recognizes his voice in the background and realizes they were together on her birthday years prior.
13	"Episode 13"	February 8, 2020	3.998
Jeong-hyeok gives Se-ri a ring. Dan's mother discovers Seung-jun in Dan's apartment, and he admits his feelings for Dan. Se-ri treats the squad to a shopping spree before their departure. Cheol-gang blackmails Man-bok into cooperation by threatening his son. Man-bok pretends to comply but informs Jeong-hyeok. Se-hyeong conspires with Cheol-gang to kill Se-ri. In a confrontation at a warehouse, the squad ambushes Cheol-gang's men. Se-ri arrives to support Jeong-hyeok and takes a bullet for him, leaving her critically injured. The epilogue shows that before the battle, Jeong-hyeok intended to fight alone, but the squad insisted on joining him to protect Se-ri. They are shown weeping as she lies unconscious.
14	"Episode 14"	February 9, 2020	5.119
While Se-ri undergoes surgery, the squad misses their transport back to the North. Se-ri wakes up and listens to a recording Man-bok made of her stepmother's tearful apology, leading to a reconciliation. She secures evidence of Se-hyeong and Sang-ah's collusion with Cheol-gang. Cheol-gang exposes Jeong-hyeok's location to North Korean officials, while Sang-ah reports him to the National Intelligence Service (NIS). Jeong-hyeok tracks Cheol-gang to his hideout. The NIS surrounds them; Cheol-gang attempts to shoot, and a gunshot rings out. The epilogue reveals that before leaving, Jeong-hyeok stocked Se-ri's fridge and left her a recording of his piano performance along with a handwritten note.
15	"Episode 15"	February 15, 2020	4.898
Cheol-gang is killed by the NIS, but not before shooting at Jeong-hyeok. In the North, Seung-jun is captured but rescued; he rushes to save Dan from kidnappers, suffering mortal gunshot wounds. Jeong-hyeok and his men are arrested by the NIS. To protect his squad and Se-ri, Jeong-hyeok falsely testifies that he manipulated Se-ri. Devastated by his words and suffering from sepsis, Se-ri collapses into critical condition. The epilogue shows NIS agents analyzing footage of Jeong-hyeok and Se-ri. They conclude that his behavior clearly indicates he is in love and poses no security threat.
16	"Episode 16"	February 16, 2020	6.337
Seung-jun dies after Dan confesses her love. Se-ri recovers. Jeong-hyeok's father arranges a prisoner exchange. Se-ri rushes to the border for a heartbreaking farewell where Jeong-hyeok says, "I love you". Back in the North, Jeong-hyeok's father saves the squad from an ambush. Se-ri exposes her brother's crimes. She receives scheduled messages from Jeong-hyeok for a year. Years later, Se-ri establishes a music scholarship in Switzerland hoping to find him. During a paragliding trip, she and Jeong-hyeok reunite. In the epilogue, the squad members are successful, and Dan focuses on her music career. Se-ri and Jeong-hyeok spend two weeks every year in a cottage in Switzerland.

== Production ==
=== Development ===
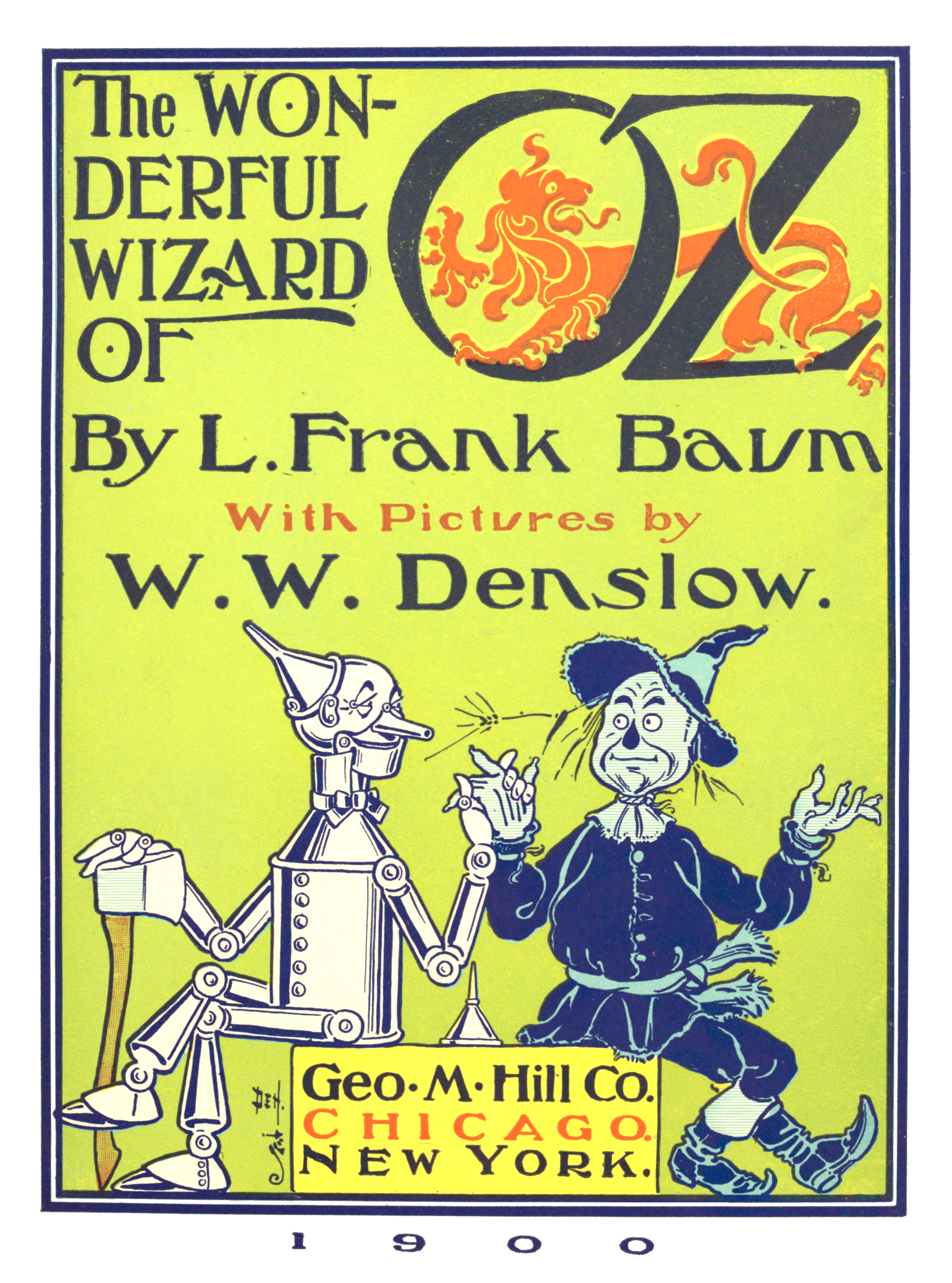
Crash Landing on You draws inspiration from The Wonderful Wizard of Oz.

Screenwriter Park Ji-eun conceived the premise for Crash Landing on You after hearing of a South Korean actress who accidentally drifted into North Korean waters while boating in Incheon in 2008. Inspired by this event, she developed a draft under the working title Chaebol in North Korea (북한에 간 재벌). The project took 11 years to materialize as Park balanced it with other commitments. Initially, the script depicted the protagonist crossing the border via a water route; however, Park revised this to an aviation accident to distinguish the plot from the films North Korean Guys (2003) and The Net (2016). Military and aviation experts advised her that paragliders are radar-evasive, unlike motorized aircraft. She also referenced accounts of KPA Special Operations Forces using paragliders to infiltrate the ROK/US Combined Forces Command.

The production team researched talk shows and content shared by defectors on AfreecaTV and YouTube to ensure the series portrayed life in North Korea accurately. Park interviewed refugees from diverse social backgrounds to gather plot ideas, including frontline officers, soldiers' wives, Ministry of State Security personnel, jangmadang merchants, kotjebi, smugglers, doctors, drivers, researchers, pianists who had studied abroad, film directors, and restaurant staff deployed overseas. Kwak Moon-an, a defector and writer, served as an assistant, while Baek Kyung-yoon, an expert in North Korean dialects, provided linguistic support to the director. Director Lee Jung-hyo stated that North Korea was chosen as the setting because it provided a "disconnected space where romance can happen, and a background where tension-filled incidents harmonize".

By 2018, the writing and pre-production were complete. The premise was driven by the paradox of the division of the Korean Peninsula: a people sharing a language, appearance, and heritage, yet isolated, with South Korean citizens barred from entering the North. The series drew thematic inspiration from The Wonderful Wizard of Oz (1900) and The Little Prince (1943), using the motif that "sometimes the wrong train takes you to the right station". On May 22, 2019, Studio Dragon and Culture Depot were announced as the production companies; Lee was attached as director, and the series was scheduled for broadcast on tvN later that year.

=== Casting ===
On the day the project was announced, Hyun Bin and Son Ye-jin were confirmed as the lead actors. This marked their second collaboration, following the 2018 film The Negotiation. Hyun was cast as Ri Jeong-hyeok. He expressed interest in the character's dual nature: outwardly principled and stoic, yet warm and sincere toward those he trusts, such as his subordinates and Yoon Se-ri. To prepare, he studied the North Korean dialect for several months and underwent physical training to suit the role. Son was cast as Se-ri, a character she described as bringing "joy and unexpected laughter". Son characterized Se-ri as not merely a perfect, haughty figure, but a down-to-earth and energetic woman whose occasional impulsiveness spreads positive energy.

In July 2019, Seo Ji-hye joined the cast as Seo Dan, Jeong-hyeok's fiancée. Seo stated she was drawn to the role because the character, despite her polished exterior, was both pure and sincere. She studied the North Korean dialect and researched local fashion and hairstyles to enhance the character's realism. That same month, Kim Jung-hyun was confirmed to play Gu Seung-jun, a businessman and swindler with a complex connection to Yoon Se-ri. Kim described the character as multifaceted, balancing ambition and a desire for conquest with a tendency to conceal his emotions.

By late July 2019, Oh Man-seok had been cast as the antagonist Cho Cheol-gang, a Ministry of State Security officer. The supporting cast included Park Myung-hoon, Kim Young-min, Ko Kyu-pil, Kim Sun-young, Nam Kyung-eup, Park Hyung-soo, Jang Hye-jin, Cha Chung-hwa, Jang So-yeon, Choi Dae-hoon, Yoon Ji-min, Tang Jun-sang, Lee Shin-young, Hwang Woo-seul-hye, Kim Young-pil, Yoo Su-bin, Im Chul-soo, and Jung Ae-ri. Production was supported by local governments, including Sunchang County and Chungju. The series featured product placement for brands such as Vanav, Genesis BBQ, Younglim Interior Design, Mediheal, Manyo Factory, and Jaguar Land Rover Korea.

Crash Landing on You had a production budget estimated by Nikkei Asia at US$20 million. In September 2019, Hi Investment & Securities reported that Studio Dragon intended to sell broadcast rights to Netflix to mitigate financial risk following the underperformance of Arthdal Chronicles (2019) and to capitalize on the competitive global over-the-top market. The firm noted that Netflix offered stable revenue independent of domestic television ratings, allowing Studio Dragon to break even regardless of the show's broadcast performance. A strategic partnership between CJ ENM, Studio Dragon, and Netflix was formalized on November 21, 2019, confirming the series' distribution on the streaming platform.

=== Filming ===
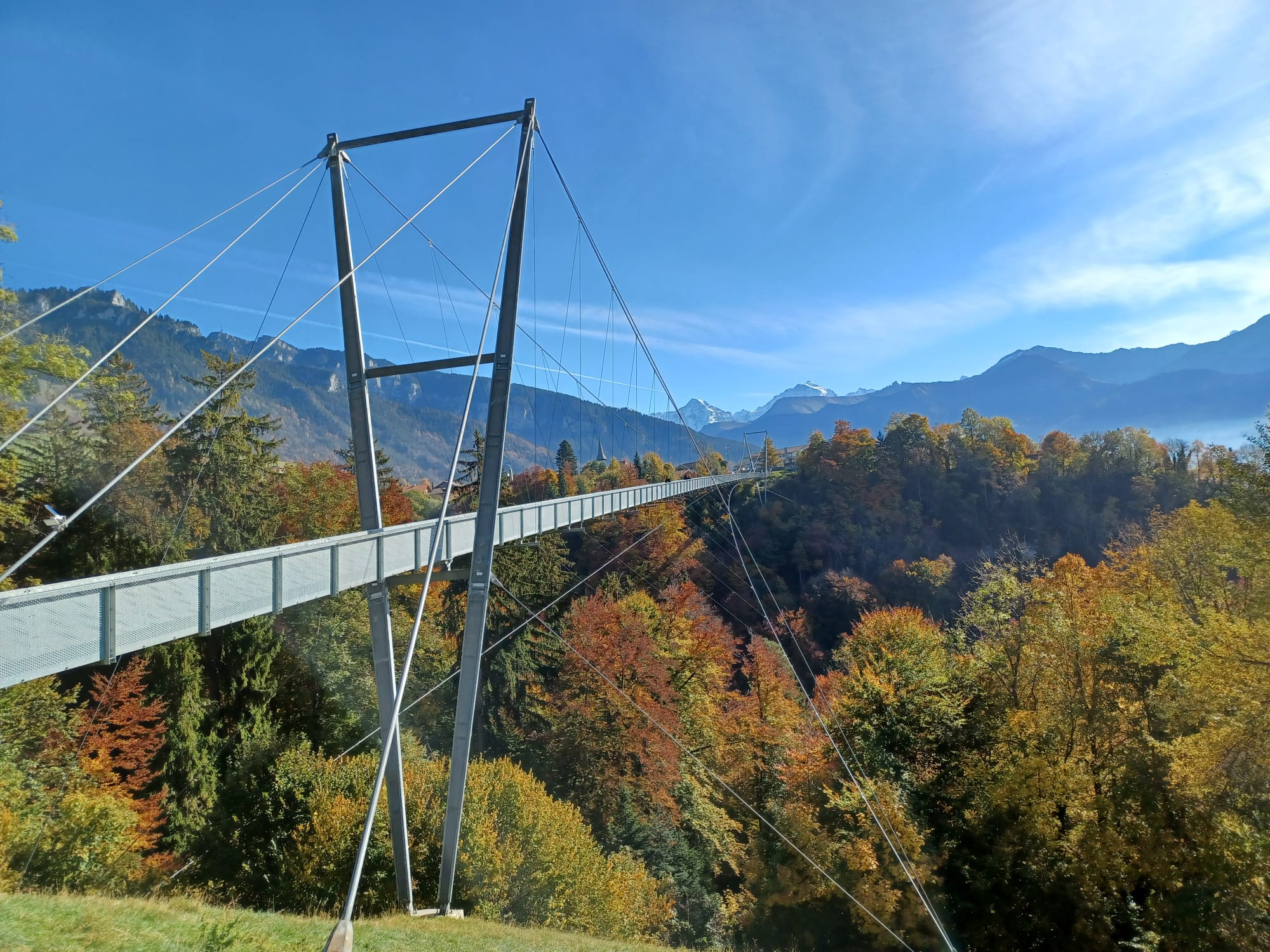
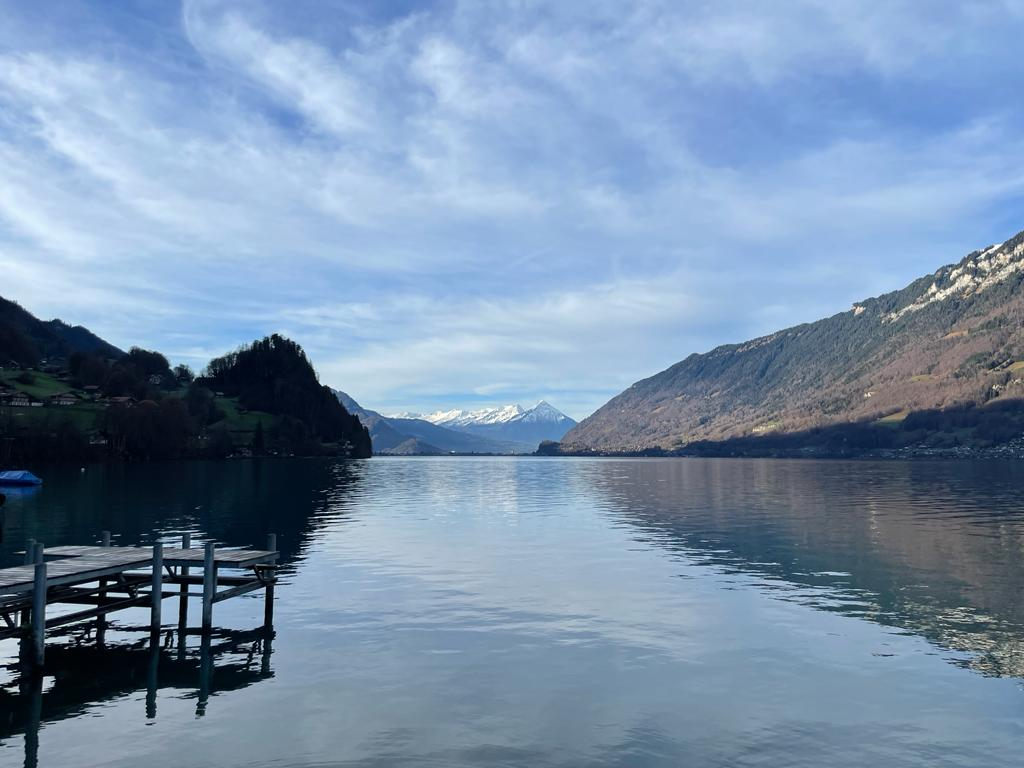
Filming locations for Crash Landing on You in Switzerland: the Sigriswil Panorama Bridge in Sigriswil (top) and the lake shore at Iseltwald (bottom).

The series followed a live-shoot system, dealing with a tight schedule and frequent interruptions throughout its six months of production. Scholars Sarah A. Son and Juliette Schwak noted that the storyline was built for both domestic and international audiences, aligning with the distribution strategies of tvN and Netflix for K-content. Production design required meticulous attention to avoid political risk. Property manager Joo Dong-man stated that items depicting the Kim family, which are illegal to reproduce in South Korea, had to be blurred or reduced in size. The team faced challenges in sourcing authentic North Korean items; for instance, North Korean-manufactured mobile phones reportedly cost three times more than an iPhone when purchased from defectors.

The first script reading took place in August 2019. Principal photography began in Switzerland that month, with Interlaken and the Jungfrau region as the setting for the protagonists' initial encounters. Locations included the mountains near Kleine Scheidegg, the Sigriswil Panorama Bridge, the Grindelwald-First adventure park, and the boat landing at Iseltwald. Filming moved to Mongolia from September 16 to 21, 2019. Ulaanbaatar substituted for Pyongyang and Kaesong stations, along with the train journey. The production used a steam locomotive, requiring filming during stops. The campfire scene in Episode 5 and the train crossing the fields were also filmed in Mongolia, with the latter captured by a drone.

The remainder of filming took place at various locations in South Korea. The paragliding accident sequence used computer-generated imagery to depict North Korean objects in a tornado, a visual homage to The Wonderful Wizard of Oz. The Korean Demilitarized Zone (DMZ) scenes were filmed at several oreums on Jeju Island; although Lee Jung-hyo visited the DMZ, he found it did not convey the "fantasy space" aesthetic the story required. The North Korean village set was constructed at lots in Hoengseong (Gangwon Province) and Chungju (North Chungcheong Province). The picnic scene in Episode 6 was filmed at Binae Island in Chungju in late November to capture the autumn reeds. On January 27, 2020, Son Ye-jin was hospitalized for fatigue but returned to the set shortly after. Filming concluded on February 13, 2020.

== Thematic analysis ==
Crash Landing on You depicts national division and was broadcast against a backdrop of improving relations between the two Koreas. Rather than focusing on conflict or reunification, the screenplay explores the possibility of coexistence, presenting the nuances between the nations. The series portrays the intersection of a chaebol heiress and a soldier; their respective personifications of capitalism and socialism render the work ideologically inseparable. Journalist and education critic Shin Nam-ho and scholar Doyle Greene noted that the ideological conflict between North and South is the obstacle to the protagonists' romance. Scholars Stephen Epstein and Christopher K. Green regard Crash Landing on You as a significant text, calling it the "most noteworthy South Korean [...] representation of North Korea". Scholar Indumathi Somashekar and cultural critic Kim Heon-sik stated that the drama changed perceptions by demonstrating the humanity and social values of North Koreans.

Son and Schwak argue that Crash Landing on You portrays North Korea with nostalgia, as "the receptacle of a Korean past characterized by ruralness and intimate community", or a version of South Korea's "pre-development". This imagery is conveyed through the contrast between the "visually muted North" and the "technicolor South", and the North Korean characters' astonishment at the modernity and affluence of Seoul. The series depicts North Korea as a totalitarian regime marked by oppression and corruption, whereas South Korea is presented as a compassionate state, evidenced by the National Intelligence Service's (NIS) humane treatment of the protagonists. The work highlights the darker side of South Korean capitalism through Se-ri's greedy brothers. Shin, Son, and Schwak each observe that the protagonists' reunion in Switzerland reflects a forced compromise and the "untimeliness of reunification"; Shin remarks that their love cannot be realized on the Korean peninsula.

Critic Hwang Jin-mi described the use of the North Korean setting in Crash Landing on You as a "masterstroke" for the romantic comedy genre. This setting generates the "forbidden" element, evoking William Shakespeare's Romeo and Juliet, and making geographical space the primary obstacle, obviating the need for a fictional country as in Descendants of the Sun (2016). The series employs K-drama tropes such as "meant-to-be" encounters and "accidental skinship", yet updates or reverses gender roles, (Note: One example of reversed gender roles is the portrayal of the female protagonist, Yoon Se-ri, as a chaebol, a character archetype typically reserved for male leads.) and mocks South Korean filmmaking stereotypes. (Note: The series satirizes dramatic tropes through the character Kim Ju-meok, who, upon watching South Korean dramas, argues that amnesia is a "common illness in capitalistic countries".) The "male as saviour" and "female as damsel" tropes are reworked, as the protagonists risk their lives to save each other. Scholar An Ji-yoon describes the aesthetic of Crash Landing on You as quirky and fairy tale-like. According to scholar Kim Jeong-hee, North Korean dialects with explanatory subtitles and pop culture references, such as the boy band BTS, attracted viewers.

Crash Landing on You was highly acclaimed for its re-creation of life in North Korea, based on research and consultation with defectors. Journalist Joo Sung-ha, a defector, remarked that the series accurately depicted many aspects, from citizens secretly accessing South Korean media to morning propaganda exercises. The series highlights resource scarcity through frequent power outages, bicycle-powered televisions, and the stockpiling of batteries. Other depictions of daily hardship include bathing in washbasins during winter and using seawater to make kimchi due to salt shortages. The series depicts jangmadang as sites for the illicit trade of South Korean products, and illustrates the life of the Pyongyang elite as similar to that in a capitalist society. The drama does not shy away from realities such as unannounced home inspections, mass surveillance, and corruption.

== Original soundtrack ==
Crash Landing on You OST

Soundtrack album by Various Artist
- Released: February 16, 2020
- Genre: Soundtrack
- Length: 104:48
- Label: Stone Music Entertainment

Crash Landing on You OST was produced by music director Nam Hye-seung and contains 11 singles and 18 original score tracks. Stone Music Entertainment released the album on digital music platforms on February 16, 2020. The physical edition, available for pre-order on February 11 and officially released on February 17, consists of two CDs, a 104-page lyric photobook, two mini-posters, and two film photocards; pre-orders included an additional exclusive poster. A vinyl edition comprising two LPs and a lyric photobook was released on September 26, 2022. This version omitted IU's "Give You My Heart" (마음을 드려요) and several background tracks, reducing the total to 22 tracks.

The soundtrack's lead single, "But It's Destiny" (우연인 듯 운명) by 10cm, draws its themes from coincidence and fate. It is a slow-tempo track that opens with piano before incorporating electronic ambient sounds and guitar. Yoon Mi-rae's "Flower" has a vocal style simpler than and distinct from her previous soundtrack contributions. The third single, Davichi's "Sunset" (노을), is a ballad blending acoustic instruments with modern rock elements. Its lyrics use a recurring sunset as a metaphor for the regret of being unable to repay a silent love. Baek Ye-rin's "Here I Am Again" (다시 난, 여기) eschews a repetitive verse structure in favor of a progressive narrative. The song expresses the longing of lovers forced to separate, who prioritize each other's well-being but ultimately return to one another.

Kim Jae-hwan's "Someday" (어떤 날엔) combines piano and strings to represent the sorrow of Ri Jeong-hyeok and Yoon Se-ri regarding their impossible romance. The production team designed the Part 6 single "Photo of My Mind" (내 마음의 사진) by Song Ga-in, Part 7's "The Hill of Yearning" (그리움의 언덕) by April 2, and the instrumental "The Season of Us" (너와 나의 그 계절) as a connected suite. These tracks share a short motif influenced by Korean folk music to reflect the series' North–South Korean setting. While built on the same opening melody, their structures diverge in the latter half. The lyrics of "The Hill of Yearning" and "Photo of My Mind" function as a call and response, respectively.

Sejeong's "All of My Days" (나의 모든 날) opens directly with vocals to create a monologue-like effect conveying unspoken words to a lover. "Like You" (좋다), a duet by So Soo-bin and Nature's Sohee, uses acoustic guitar to capture the euphoria of love through everyday imagery. Crush's "Let Us Go" (둘만의 세상으로 가) is a piano-driven track that reflects the protagonists' lingering emotions. The final single, IU's "Give You My Heart", has whispered vocals and a breathy delivery. The arrangement progresses from a calm first verse to a string-backed chorus in the second verse, followed by an a cappella section after the climax. The lyrics express a painful and earnest confession.

Several background tracks establish the series' atmosphere, including the opening theme "Sigriswil" (시그리스빌), performed by Kim Kyung-hee of April 2 with a gender-neutral vocal tone. "The Song for My Brother" (형을 위한 노래) is a piano piece symbolizing Jeong-hyeok's nostalgia for his brother and his predestined connection with Se-ri; its melody resembles a music box. Im Ra-ra of Top Star News praised the soundtrack as an "OST gourmet spot", noting that the music heightened the series' visual and auditory appeal. The album peaked at number 8 on the weekly Gaon Album Chart and number 14 on the monthly chart for February 2020. By the end of the first half of 2020, the album had sold 24,881 copies.

List of singles from Crash Landing on You OST
Title	Peak positions		Release date	Remarks
Title	KOR Gaon	KOR Hot	Release date	Remarks
"But It's Destiny" (10cm)	108	72	December 15, 2019	Part 1
"Flower" (Yoon Mi-rae)	22	20	December 22, 2019	Part 2
"Sunset" (Davichi)	47	32	December 29, 2019	Part 3
"Here I Am Again" (Baek Ye-rin)	4	6	January 12, 2020	Part 4
"Someday" (Kim Jae-hwan)	18	17	January 19, 2020	Part 5
"Photo of My Mind" (Song Ga-in)	35	31	January 25, 2020	Part 6
"The Hill of Yearning" (April 2)	187	—	January 26, 2020	Part 7
"All of My Days" (Sejeong)	50	31	February 1, 2020	Part 8
"Like You" (So Soo-bin and Sohee)	—	—	February 2, 2020	Part 9
"Let Us Go" (Crush)	3	7	February 9, 2020	Part 10
"Give You My Heart" (IU)	1	3	February 15, 2020	Part 11
"—" denotes a single that did not chart.

Crash Landing on You OST – CD 1
No.	Title	Lyrics	Music	Artist	Length
1.	"But It's Destiny" (우연인 듯 운명)	Jung Gu-hyun	Jung Gu-hyun	10cm	3:51
2.	"Flower"	Nam Hye-seung; Park Jin-ho	Nam Hye-seung; Surf Green	Yoon Mi-rae	4:12
3.	"Sunset" (노을)	Park Woo-sang	Park Woo-sang	Davichi	3:36
4.	"Here I Am Again" (다시 난, 여기)	Nam Hye-seung; Surf Green	Nam Hye-seung; Surf Green	Baek Ye-rin	3:54
5.	"Someday" (어떤 날엔)	Kim Ho-kyung	1601	Kim Jae-hwan	4:18
6.	"Sigriswil" (시그리스빌)	Kim Kyung-hee; Nam Hye-seung	Kim Kyung-hee; Nam Hye-seung; Park Sang-hee	Kim Kyung-hee	3:42
7.	"Spring in My Hometown" (고향의 봄)			Nam Hye-seung; Park Sang-hee	4:47
8.	"The Wind of the Day" (그날의 바람)			Nam Hye-seung; Park Sang-hee	4:58
9.	"The Song for My Brother" (형을 위한 노래)			Nam Hye-seung; Park Sang-hee	4:21
10.	"My Companion" (나의 동무여)			Nam Hye-seung; Park Sang-hee	5:15
11.	"Like a Wild Flower" (들꽃처럼)			Nam Hye-seung; Park Sang-hee	4:35
12.	"Time of Jeong-Hyeok for Se-ri" (세리를 향한 정혁의 시간)			Nam Hye-seung; Park Sang-hee	1:48
13.	"Moments We Walked Together" (함께 걷던 순간)			Nam Hye-seung; Go Eun-jung	2:34
14.	"Seri's Choice" (세리스 쵸이스)			Nam Hye-seung; Park Sang-hee	1:54
Total length:					53:40

Crash Landing on You OST – CD 2
No.	Title	Lyrics	Music	Artist	Length
1.	"Photo of My Mind" (내 마음의 사진)	Nam Hye-seung; Kim Kyung-hee	Nam Hye-seung; Surf Green	Song Ga-in	4:32
2.	"The Hill of Yearning" (그리움의 언덕)	Nam Hye-seung; Kim Kyung-hee	Nam Hye-seung; Kim Kyung-hee	April 2	3:54
3.	"All of My Days" (나의 모든 날)	Nam Hye-seung; B.a.B	Nam Hye-seung; B.a.B	Sejeong	3:58
4.	"Like You" (좋다)	Lee Geon; Choi Eun-hye	Lee Geon	So Soo-bin; Sohee (Nature)	3:25
5.	"Let Us Go" (둘만의 세상으로 가)	Dong Woo-seok	Dong Woo-seok; Yoo Jung-hyun; Jayins	Crush	3:41
6.	"Give You My Heart" (마음을 드려요)	Nam Hye-seung; Park Jin-ho	Nam Hye-seung; Park Jin-ho	IU	4:40
7.	"Yeong-ae and Villagers" (영애동지와 마을 사람들)			Nam Hye-seung; Park Sang-hee	3:14
8.	"Chi-soo and Se-ri" (치수와 세리)			Nam Hye-seung; Park Sang-hee	3:14
9.	"The Song for My Brother" (형을 위한 노래; orchestral ver.)			Nam Hye-seung; Park Sang-hee	4:35
10.	"Seo Dan" (단이)			Nam Hye-seung; Park Sang-hee	0:52
11.	"Same Sky, Different World" (같은 하늘, 다른 세상)			Nam Hye-seung; Park Sang-hee	3:18
12.	"Picnic" (소풍)			Nam Hye-seung; Park Sang-hee	3:12
13.	"The Season of Us" (너와 나의 그 계절)			Nam Hye-seung; Park Sang-hee	3:47
14.	"When That Day Comes" (그날이 오면)			Nam Hye-seung; Park Sang-hee	4:22
15.	"Sigriswil" (Opening title ver.)	Kim Kyung-hee; Nam Hye-seung	Kim Kyung-hee; Nam Hye-seung; Park Sang-hee	Kim Kyung-hee	0:42
Total length:					51:08

Vinyl release

Crash Landing on You OST (Milk Clear & Purple Opaque) Vinyl LP 1 – Side A
1. "Sigriswil" (Opening title ver.)
2. "Here I Am Again"
3. "Flower"
4. "Someday"
5. "All of My Days"
6. "Like You"

Crash Landing on You OST (Milk Clear & Purple Opaque) Vinyl LP 1 – Side B
1. "Let Us Go"
2. "Sunset"
3. "Photo of My Mind"
4. "But It's Destiny"
5. "The Hill of Yearning"

Crash Landing on You OST (Milk Clear & Purple Opaque) Vinyl LP 2 – Side C
1. "The Song for My Brother" (Orchestral ver.)
2. "The Season of Us"
3. "When That Day Comes"
4. "Picnic"
5. "Time of Jeong-Hyeok for Se-ri"
6. "Seo Dan"

Crash Landing on You OST (Milk Clear & Purple Opaque) Vinyl LP 2 – Side D
1. "The Wind of the Day"
2. "Same Sky, Different World"
3. "Like a Wild Flower"
4. "Yeong-ae and Villagers"
5. "Sigriswil"

== Release ==
=== Promotion ===
On October 25, 2019, tvN released a 14-second teaser for Crash Landing on You on YouTube, featuring Hyun Bin and Son Ye-jin in Switzerland and Mongolia. In early November, a second teaser showed Hyun discovering Son suspended from a tree, aiming his gun at her before she lost her balance and fell into his arms. Three days later, tvN unveiled the first poster, depicting the two leads camping under a starry sky and confirming the series' December 2019 premiere. Footage from the script reading was released on November 8, 2019.

On November 15, 2019, tvN released a promotional interview with Hyun and Son. In the following days, the production team published character stills of Hyun, Son, Seo Ji-hye, and Kim Jung-hyun. On November 19, character teasers for the four leads were released, followed on November 29 by the first trailer, which introduced the central romance. The main poster, featuring the four lead actors, was unveiled on December 8, 2019. The following day, the director and cast held a press conference to discuss the series' plot. During the broadcast, the production team released stills, teasers, highlights, and behind-the-scenes footage.

=== Broadcast and other media ===
Crash Landing on You followed Melting Me Softly in tvN's weekend 21:00 (KST) time slot. Consisting of 16 episodes, the series premiered on December 14, 2019, and was originally scheduled to conclude on February 2, 2020. On December 31, 2019, the production team announced a hiatus for the first week of January 2020 to ensure safe filming conditions. On January 4 and 5, 2020, tvN aired two specials titled "Turn on the Light of Love" (사랑불을 켜라), which recapped episodes 3 through 6 and included behind-the-scenes footage. On January 20, 2020, the team announced a second hiatus for the Lunar New Year holiday; a special episode titled "Lunar New Year Gift Set" (설 선물세트) aired on January 25. The series ended its run on February 16, 2020.

In South Korea, the series was livestreamed on the subscription platform TVING. The platform's servers crashed during one episode due to high traffic, with 92.5% of active users accessing the stream. Episodes were subsequently made available on TVING's video-on-demand service. Internationally, Netflix acquired exclusive distribution rights in over 190 countries through a strategic partnership with CJ E&M and Studio Dragon. In Asia, English-speaking regions, and Latin America, episodes were released on Netflix immediately following the Korean broadcast. In Japan and Europe, the complete series was released on February 16, 2020. In the Netflix version, a background track used in episode 13 during Kim Ju-meok's meeting with Choi Ji-woo was replaced due to copyright issues.

In 2022, Crash Landing on You was adapted into a stage musical written by Park Hae-rim, composed by Lee Sang-hoon, and directed by Park Ji-hye. Running for 170 minutes with a 20-minute intermission, the production premiered on September 16, 2022, achieving commercial success comparable to the original drama. A filmed version of the musical was released exclusively at CJ CGV theaters on November 30, 2023.

== Reception ==
=== Critical reception ===
Crash Landing on You attracted critical attention for its depiction of North Korea. Critics praised the series and included it on lists of the best Korean dramas on Netflix. (Note: Sourced from Marie Claire, Harper's Bazaar, /Film, Today, Boy Genius Report, Decider, The Washington Post, GQ India and Entertainment Weekly.) On the review aggregator Rotten Tomatoes, the series holds an approval rating of 100% based on six reviews. Megan Vick of Entertainment Weekly and Kayti Burt of Time described it as "perfect" and "iconic", respectively, recommending it as an ideal introduction to Korean dramas. Variety called it an "unforgettable classic", while Jo Walker of The Guardian characterized the show as "addictively off-the-wall, heartbreaking and hilarious".

Reviewers commended the series' production values, describing them as "outstanding", with "beautiful visuals" and "deft telling". Journalists from The Washington Post praised it as "charming" and "addictive", and Wadzanai Mhute of The Daily Beast noted that it "draws the viewer in". Samuel Stone of /Film and a critic for Variety highlighted the blend of romantic comedy and action. While Vick and Erikson found the premise somewhat absurd, cultural critic Ha Jae-geun praised the show's ability to execute the concept without feeling forced. Stone compared the South Korean subplot involving a family power struggle to the American series Succession (2018–2023).

The cast's performances received critical acclaim. Pop culture critic Hwang Jin-mi noted that the acting helped overshadow controversies regarding the show's portrayal of North Korea. Burt, Mhute, and Cinema Escapist critic Anthony Kao lauded the chemistry between leads Hyun Bin and Son Ye-jin, identifying it as a key factor in the show's popularity among romance fans. Writing for TV Daily, Yoon Ji-hye asserted that the pair compensated for the script's shortcomings, making the unrealistic premise convincing. Randy Schiff of The Buffalo News called Son's performance "excellent", praising her decisive and charismatic portrayal, while Yoon commended her complex depiction, balancing desperation, humor, and strength.

Schiff described Hyun's performance as "superb". Yoon observed that he established a new archetype for North Korean men, while Mhute found his portrayal of a soldier "emotionally repressed" and "captivating". Burt credited the supporting cast with the show's success, while Walker noted that they made the series enjoyable. Both Lee Su-yeon of IZE and Erikson praised the supporting actors, emphasizing the narrative importance of the four soldiers under Jeong-hyeok's command and the women in the North Korean village. Schiff singled out Yang Kyung-won, Hwang Woo-seul-hye, Oh Man-seok, Nam Kyung-eup, and Yoo Su-bin for their "fine performances". Mhute appreciated the show's use of a metanarrative through a soldier obsessed with K-dramas.

=== Viewership ===
Crash Landing on You gained a massive domestic and international following, bolstered by the global rise in television viewership during the COVID-19 pandemic. Domestically, the series was characterized as a "national romantic comedy", consistently topping viewership ratings across all channels during its timeslot. It premiered with a nationwide rating of 6.1% and concluded with 21.6%, surpassing Guardian: The Lonely and Great God (2016–2017) as the highest-rated drama in tvN history. The series maintained this record for four years until it was overtaken in 2024 by Queen of Tears, another work by Park Ji-eun.

The series was smuggled into North Korea via videotapes and hard disk drives from the Chinese border, gaining widespread viewership. Surveys conducted in 2021 and 2022 identified Crash Landing on You as the most popular K-drama in North Korea. In Japan, the drama captivated audiences during the COVID-19 pandemic. Following its February release, it remained in Netflix Japan's top 10 list through June 2020. The title Crash Landing on You ranked among the top ten buzzwords of 2020 selected by U-Can. Netflix ranked the series fourth on its list of most-loved South Korean TV shows of 2019.

Crash Landing on You : South Korea viewers per episode (millions)

Season	Episode number																Average
Season	1	2	3	4	5	6	7	8	9	10	11	12	13	14	15	16	Average
1	1.508	1.773	1.894	2.225	2.210	2.414	2.510	3.043	2.941	3.927	3.726	4.782	3.998	5.119	4.898	6.337	3.331

Source: Audience measurement performed nationwide by Nielsen Korea. (Note: Nationwide viewership ratings sourced from Nielsen Korea: Ep. 1, Ep. 2, Ep. 3, Ep. 4, Ep. 5, Ep. 6, Ep. 7, Ep. 8, Ep. 9, Ep. 10, Ep. 11, Ep. 12, Ep. 13, Ep. 14, Ep. 15, Ep. 16, Special 1, Special 2, Special 3.)

Average TV viewership ratings (South Korea)
Ep.	Original broadcast date	Average audience share (Nielsen Korea)	
Ep.	Original broadcast date	Nationwide	Seoul (Note: Seoul Capital Area viewership ratings sourced from Nielsen Korea: Ep. 1, Ep. 2, Ep. 3, Ep. 4, Ep. 5, Ep. 6, Ep. 7, Ep. 8, Ep. 9, Ep. 10, Ep. 11, Ep. 12, Ep. 13, Ep. 14, Ep. 15, Ep. 16, Special 1, Special 2, Special 3.)
1	December 14, 2019	6.074% (1st)	6.558% (1st)
2	December 15, 2019	6.845% (1st)	7.841% (1st)
3	December 21, 2019	7.414% (1st)	7.689% (1st)
4	December 22, 2019	8.499% (1st)	9.409% (1st)
5	December 28, 2019	8.730% (1st)	9.794% (1st)
6	December 29, 2019	9.223% (1st)	9.535% (1st)
7	January 11, 2020	9.394% (1st)	9.738% (1st)
8	January 12, 2020	11.349% (1st)	12.031% (1st)
9	January 18, 2020	11.516% (1st)	12.355% (1st)
10	January 19, 2020	14.633% (1st)	15.903% (1st)
11	February 1, 2020	14.238% (1st)	14.648% (1st)
12	February 2, 2020	15.933% (1st)	16.413% (1st)
13	February 8, 2020	14.097% (1st)	14.620% (1st)
14	February 9, 2020	17.705% (1st)	18.612% (1st)
15	February 15, 2020	17.066% (1st)	17.406% (1st)
16	February 16, 2020	21.683% (1st)	23.249% (1st)
Average		12.150%	12.863%
Specials
Special 1	January 4, 2020	3.810% (1st)	4.253% (1st)
Special 2	January 5, 2020	2.975% (1st)	3.252% (1st)
Special 3	January 25, 2020	4.180% (1st)	4.283% (1st)
Blue denotes the lowest rating, red denotes the highest rating, and the numbers in parentheses denote the show's rank.

=== Accolades ===
On May 14, 2020, the Ministry of Unification named Park Ji-eun the "Unification Education Person of the Year". She was recognized for her indirect portrayal of North Korean culture and her positive influence on unification education through the series.

List of awards and nominations received by Crash Landing on You
Year	Award ceremony	Category	Recipient	Result	Ref.
2020	29th Seoul Music Awards	OST Award	"Flower" (Yoon Mi-rae)	Nominated	
2020	56th Baeksang Arts Awards	Best Drama	Crash Landing on You	Nominated	
2020	56th Baeksang Arts Awards	Best Director	Lee Jung-hyo	Nominated	
2020	56th Baeksang Arts Awards	Best Actor	Hyun Bin	Nominated	
2020	56th Baeksang Arts Awards	Best Actress	Son Ye-jin	Nominated	
2020	56th Baeksang Arts Awards	Best Supporting Actor	Yang Kyung-won	Nominated	
2020	56th Baeksang Arts Awards	Best Supporting Actress	Kim Sun-young	Won	
2020	56th Baeksang Arts Awards	Best Supporting Actress	Seo Ji-hye	Nominated	
2020	56th Baeksang Arts Awards	Best Screenplay	Park Ji-eun	Nominated	
2020	56th Baeksang Arts Awards	Popularity Award	Hyun Bin	Won	
2020	56th Baeksang Arts Awards	Popularity Award	Son Ye-jin	Won	
2020	56th Baeksang Arts Awards	Bazaar Icon Award	Seo Ji-hye	Won	
2020	15th Seoul International Drama Awards	Best Mini-Series	Crash Landing on You	Nominated	
2020	15th Seoul International Drama Awards	Outstanding Korean Drama	Crash Landing on You	Won	
2020	15th Seoul International Drama Awards	Outstanding Korean Actress	Son Ye-jin	Won	
2020	Asian Academy Creative Awards	Best Drama Series (Korea)	Crash Landing on You	Won	
2020	Asian Academy Creative Awards	Best Drama Series (Grand Final)	Crash Landing on You	Won	
2020	Asia Contents Awards	Best Asian Drama	Crash Landing on You	Nominated	
2020	Asia Contents Awards	Best Creative	Crash Landing on You	Nominated	
2020	Asia Contents Awards	Best Writer	Park Ji-eun	Nominated	
2020	Korea Cable TV Broadcasting Association	Global Award (VOD Category)	Crash Landing on You	Won	
2020	Tokyo Drama Awards 2020	Overseas Drama Special Award	Crash Landing on You	Won	
2020	2020 Mnet Asian Music Awards	Best OST	"Here I Am Again" (Baek Ye-rin)	Nominated	
2020	3rd Annual Global TV Demand Awards	Most In-Demand Korean Drama Series	Crash Landing on You	Won	
2020	7th APAN Star Awards	Grand Prize	Hyun Bin	Won	
2020	7th APAN Star Awards	Drama of the Year	Crash Landing on You	Nominated	
2020	7th APAN Star Awards	Top Excellence Award, Actress in a Miniseries	Son Ye-jin	Nominated	
2020	7th APAN Star Awards	Excellence Award, Actress in a Miniseries	Seo Ji-hye	Nominated	
2020	7th APAN Star Awards	Best Supporting Actor	Kim Jung-hyun	Nominated	
2020	7th APAN Star Awards	Best Supporting Actor	Yang Kyung-won	Nominated	
2020	7th APAN Star Awards	Best Supporting Actor	Kim Young-min	Won	
2020	7th APAN Star Awards	Best Supporting Actress	Kim Sun-young	Won	
2020	7th APAN Star Awards	KT Seezn Star Award	Son Ye-jin	Won	
2021	30th Seoul Music Awards	OST Award	"Here I Am Again" (Baek Ye-rin)	Nominated	
2021	30th Seoul Music Awards	OST Award	"Give You My Heart" (IU)	Nominated	
2021	Korea Communications Commission Broadcasting Awards	Grand Prize	Crash Landing on You	Won	
2021	Korea Cable TV Broadcasting Association	PP Special Award (VOD Category)	Crash Landing on You	Won	

=== Controversies and North Korean reaction ===
Crash Landing on You faced criticism for "glamorizing North Korea", as commentators argued that the series idealized life in the country in a way that contradicted reality. (Note: Some examples cited as "glamorizing North Korea" were the depiction of women diligently making kimchi by a stream next to drying persimmons, which created a cozy and peaceful atmosphere, and the prominent display of propaganda slogans such as "People's Paradise" (인민의 락원) and "Songun Revolution, Strong and Prosperous Nation" (선군혁명 강성대국) throughout the series.) Drama critic Gong Hee-jeong argued that the screenwriters' portrayal of North Koreans was "excessive", alienating some viewers. Conversely, cultural critic Hwang Jin-mi dismissed these criticisms, noting that the series depicted negative aspects of North Korean life, such as frequent blackouts, stalled trains, and kotjebi. On January 22, 2020, the Seoul Metropolitan Police Agency reviewed a January 9 complaint filed by the Christian Liberty Unification Party, which accused tvN and the series' production team of violating the National Security Act for praising the North Korean regime. According to Asia Economy, the police faced a dilemma regarding the investigation, since inter-Korean relations had improved under President Moon Jae-in.

The series also faced scrutiny over blatant product placement involving South Korean brands, despite the primarily North Korean setting. Many viewers found these details forced and unrealistic, particularly as some products were modeled by the series' actors. (Note: One criticized instance of product placement involved the character Ri Jeong-hyeok buying various necessities for Yoon Se-ri. In reality, these specific products were endorsed by Son Ye-jin, the actress playing Yoon Se-ri, leading critics to view the scene as unnatural and blatantly commercial.) Anticipating controversy, the production team included a disclaimer at the start of episodes that emphasized the series' fictional nature. Lee Jung-hyo maintained that it was a romantic comedy and a bright fantasy in which the romance between the four main characters could unfold. The team clarified that scenes with South Korean products, such as coffee sticks and "talking rice cookers", were not intentional product placement but an attempt to depict items from jangmadang. They stated that they strove to portray North Korea as authentically as possible.

On March 4, 2020, North Korean outlets, including Uriminzokkiri and Arirang Meari, published articles criticizing recent South Korean film and television productions that depicted the North. They condemned these works as "provocations", "defamation", and "distortion", accusing them of exploiting the tragedy of national division for profit. Although the articles did not name the works, South Korean media interpreted them as referring to Crash Landing on You and the 2019 film Ashfall. Film critic Cho Hee-moon noted that art in North Korea, unlike in free societies, functions not as a creative outlet but as state propaganda designed to uphold the Workers' Party's ideological standards. Cho observed that this focus on political messaging over entertainment in North Korean media contrasts with South Korean productions.

== Legacy ==
Crash Landing on You sparked a resurgence of the Korean Wave and attracted a broader audience, including a significant male viewership. During its broadcast, keywords such as "Director of the General Political Bureau of the KPA" and gwittaegi became trending search topics in South Korea. Brands such as BBQ Chicken and Mediheal credited their product placement in the series with a surge in sales. The drama revitalized interest in South Korean content in Japan. It led viewers to subscribe to Netflix specifically to watch the show and turned the series into a social phenomenon; Weekly Asahi noted that Hyun Bin's popularity led to a surge in Japanese women suffering from "Hyun Bin loss". Crash Landing on You drew large numbers of fans to its filming locations in Switzerland and raised overtourism concerns. In 2023, Iseltwald implemented a toll for access to the dock where the character Ri Jeong-hyeok plays the piano.

According to Radio Free Asia, the line "Are you a General?" (네가 장군님이니?) from the series became a popular slang term within North Korea. In South Pyongan Province, the phrase is used to mock those who are arrogant or boastful, while in North Hamgyong Province, it is used to humiliate inexperienced youth who behave insolently. Authorities reportedly cracked down on the use of the phrase after viewing it as a swipe at Kim Jong Un's leadership. Fearful of the consequences, many residents scrambled to hide or destroy their hard drives and SD cards to avoid being caught with the show. Scholar Choi Sang-min suggests that because Crash Landing on You circulated widely and resonated emotionally with North Korean citizens, the regime was compelled to react aggressively and tighten control by increasing penalties for consuming South Korean media.

In late February 2020, the production team and Park Ji-eun donated 130 million won to the Hope Bridge Korea Disaster Relief Association to support the response to the COVID-19 pandemic in South Korea. The series also impacted the personal lives of lead actors Hyun Bin and Son Ye-jin, who began dating in March 2020 and married on February 10, 2022. In June 2024, the series was parodied as "Trash Landing on You" (쓰레기의 불시착) to satirize North Korea's deployment of waste-filled balloons into South Korea. South Korean activists have used the series as anti-Pyongyang propaganda and sent it to the North via USB drives, bottles, and balloons. An American remake, produced by Studio Dragon in collaboration with a U.S. partner, is in development.
