= My First Time (TV series) =

- Promotional Poster
- Genre: Youth drama; Romantic comedy
- Written by: Jung Hyun-jung
- Directed by: Lee Jung-hyo
- Starring: Choi Min-ho; Park So-dam; Kim Min-jae; Jung Yoo-jin; Lee Yi-kyung; Cho Hye-jung
- Country of origin: South Korea
- Original language: Korean
- No. of episodes: 8

Production
- Executive producer: Lee Sang-baek
- Running time: 45 minutes Wednesdays at 23:00 (KST)
- Production company: AStory

Original release
- Network: OnStyle
- Release: October 7 – November 25, 2015

Related
- My First First Love

My First Time (Korean: 처음이라서; RR: Cheoeumiraseo; lit. 'Because It's The First Time') is a South Korean television series written by Jung Hyun-jung and directed by Lee Jung-hyo. It stars Choi Min-ho, Park So-dam, Kim Min-jae, Jung Yoo-jin, Lee Yi-kyung and Cho Hye-jung. It is the first drama produced by OnStyle network, and it started airing on October 7, 2015, every Wednesday at 23:00 (KST) for eight episodes. The series centers around six young people who gather on the rooftop of Tae-oh's house as their hideout. They each have their own story.

In 2019, the series was rebooted on Netflix under the title My First First Love.

== Cast ==
=== Main cast ===
- Choi Min-ho as Yoon Tae-oh
- Park So-dam as Han Song-yi
- Kim Min-jae as Seo Ji-an
- Jung Yoo-jin as Ryoo Se-hyun
- Lee Yi-kyung as Choi Hoon
- Cho Hye-jung as Oh Ga-rin

=== Supporting cast ===
- Ahn Nae-sang as Tae-o's father
- Jung Man-sik as Ji-an's father
- Ahn Woo-yeon
- Park Sung-woo as Park Sung-woo
- Lee Doo-suk
- Lee Se-wook
- Jang Hae-song

=== Cameo appearances ===
- Im Yoon-ah as Im Yoon-ah (Yoon Tae-oh's senior) (episode 1)
- Hong Seok-cheon as a café manager (episode 1)
- Lee Seung-yeon as Song-Yi's aunt (episode 1)
- Yang Hee-kyung as a counselor (episode 1)
- Jung Kyung-ho as a policeman (episode 2)
- Yoon Hyun-min as a policeman (episode 2)

== Notes ==
- This is the first drama series produced by OnStyle.
- My First Time has surpassed 300 million views online.

== Original soundtracks ==
"My First Time" OST:
No.	Title	Artist	Length
1.	"Our Feeling"	Lim Yoon-chan	3:47
2.	"Song For You"	Elsa Kopf	3:58
3.	"Autumn Sky"	O.O.O	4:26
4.	"Just Like Where We Are Now"	Ryu Ji-hyun	4:26

== Awards and nominations ==
Year	Award	Category	Recipient	Result
2016	52nd Paeksang Arts Awards	Best New Actress	Park So-dam	Nominated
