= Lee Jung-hyo (director) =

South Korean director

- Born: South Korea
- Education: Kyungnam University (Bachelor of Sociology)
- Occupation: television director
- Years active: 2000 to present

Korean name
- Hangul: 이정효
- RR: I Jeonghyo
- MR: I Chŏnghyo

Lee Jung-hyo (Korean: 이정효) is a South Korean television director, known for his drama Crash Landing on You.

== Career ==
Lee started his career in MBC TV. He debuted with MBC Dramanet's Seoul Martial Arts Story (2008–2009).

== Filmography ==
Year	Title	Role	Ref.
2000–2001	Prince Ondal	Assistant director	
2001–2002	Maybe it's okay	Assistant director	
2002–2003	Inspector Park Mun-su	Assistant director	
2003	2003 New Cowherd and Weaver Girl	Assistant director	
2004	People of Water Flower Village	Assistant director	
2005	Fashion 70s	Co-director	
2005–2006	Seodongyo	Assistant director	
2006	Best Theater - How Are You, Youth?	Solo production	
2006–2007	Lover	Assistant director	
2007–2008	Winter Bird	Assistant director	
2007	Auction House	Co-director	
2008–2009	Seoul Warrior Story	Director	
2010	OB & GY	Assistant director	
2011	I Need Romance	Assistant director	
2012	I Need Romance 2012	Director	
2013	Heartless City	Director	
2014	Witch's Romance	Director	
2015	My First Time	Director	
2016	The Good Wife	Director	
2018	Life on Mars	Director	
2019	Romance is a Bonus Book	Director	
2019–2020	Crash Landing on You	Director	
2023	Doona!	Director	
2025	The Price of Confession	Director	
TBA	Long Vacation	Director	

== Accolades ==
=== Awards and nominations ===
Award	Year	Category	Recipient	Result	Ref.
Asia Contents Awards	2020	Best Asian Drama	Crash Landing on You	Nominated	
Asia Contents Awards	2020	Best Creative	Crash Landing on You	Nominated	
Asian Academy Creative Awards	2020	Best Drama Series (Korea)	Crash Landing on You	Won	
Asian Academy Creative Awards	2020	Best Drama Series (Grand Final)	Crash Landing on You	Won	
7th APAN Star Awards	2020	Drama of the Year	Crash Landing on You	Nominated	
3rd Annual Global TV Demand Awards	2020	Most In-Demand Korean Drama Series	Crash Landing on You	Won	
56th Baeksang Arts Awards	2020	Best Drama	Crash Landing on You	Nominated	
56th Baeksang Arts Awards	2020	Best Director	Lee Jung-hyo	Nominated	
Korea Cable TV Broadcasting Association	2020	Global Award (VOD Category)	Crash Landing on You	Won	
Korea Cable TV Broadcasting Association	2021	PP Special Award (VOD Category)	Crash Landing on You	Won	
Korea Communications Commission Broadcasting Awards	2021	Grand Prize	Crash Landing on You	Won	
15th Seoul International Drama Awards	2020	Outstanding Korean Drama	Crash Landing on You	Won	
15th Seoul International Drama Awards	2020	Best Mini-series	Crash Landing on You	Nominated	
30th Seoul Music Awards	2020	OST Award	"Flower" (Yoon Mi-rae)	Nominated	
Tokyo Drama Award 2020	2020	Overseas Drama Special Award	Crash Landing on You	Won	
