= Deepening Group Incident =

Purge in North Korea

- Hangul: 심화조 사건
- Hanja: 深化組 事件
- RR: Simhwajo sageon
- MR: Simhwajo sakŏn

The Deepening Group Incident (Korean: 심화조 사건) refers to a large-scale purge campaign within the Democratic People's Republic of Korea which took place during the period of 1996 to 2000. North Korean leader Kim Jong Il used a purging strategy in an attempt to evade his government's responsibility for the 1990s famine. In this purge, high level party officials and their families and others throughout the country were executed or sent to concentration camps, via a widespread secret police organisation called the Simhwajo (심화조).

The purge had its roots in the great famine and economic crisis of approximately 1994 to 1998, during which hundreds of thousands to possibly two million people died due to famine. Kim Jong Il, who in 1994 had become the supreme leader, established a secret police organization called Simhwajo or the "Deepening Group" within the Ministry of Social Security. (Simhwajo had the meaning of intensifying the investigation into the careers and ideology of residents, or "in-depth research into the backgrounds and thoughts of residents") Kim Jong Il appointed Jang Song-taek (then deputy director of the Organization and Guidance Department), to lead the group, which then carried out a great purge by making the senior officials, close aides, and their relatives the scapegoat for the economic crisis and famine.

Some 25,000 people are thought to have been purged under the pretext of being spies, including civilians and high-ranking government officials, of whom approximately 10,000 were executed, and about 15,000 sent to concentration camps. Amongst high ranking party-members and bureaucrats found responsible were Seo Kwan-hee, agricultural secretary of the Central Committee of the Party (executed by firing squad), and Moon Seong-sik, the party secretary (said to have been tortured to death). Senior officials from the Kim Il Sung era were sacrificed one after another. In the southwest, South Hwanghae party secretary, Pi Chang-rin and Kaesong city party secretary Kim Gi-sun were executed as remnants of the South Korean anti-communist group, and the Northwestern Youth League. Kim Jong Il unconditionally signed the list of executions put up by the deepening group.

In 1998, due to the incidents that occurred at the Hwanghae Steel Works in South Hwanghae Province, Kim Jong Il is said to have feared alienation from the public, and started an investigation into Simhwajo, leading to its dismantlement (in this form) in 2000 and to further purges. Due to the wide scope of the incident, it aroused public discontent. Kim Jong Il stopped the purge in 2000 and executed and prosecuted some of the perpetrators of the incident, and the movement officially ended.

== Background ==
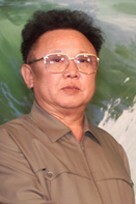
In 1997, Kim Jong Il, General Secretary of the Workers' Party of Korea, launched the "Deepening Group Incident" in an attempt to divert public attention after the Great Famine.

In the early 1990s, with the dissolution of the Soviet Union and the economic collapse, North Korea lacked the ability to purchase food and fertilizer. In addition, it suffered from natural disasters from 1994 to 1999, resulting in a sharp decline in food production and causing a nationwide famine from 1994 to 1999. At this time, North Korean leader Kim Jong Il realized that there was a sense of unease in society, and the defection of Hwang Jang-yop, secretary of the Central Secretariat of the Workers' Party of Korea, seemed to confirm this. He believed that he should do something to divert people's attention. At the same time, considering that he had been in power for three years and his power was stable, he intended to eliminate his father Kim Il Sung's subordinates. To this end, in 1997 he claimed that there were a large number of spies working for South Korea and the United States in the country, and thus launched a nationwide purge.

Kim Jong Il brought in his brother-in-law Jang Song-taek, who was also the Minister of the Central Administrative Department of the Workers' Party of Korea, to take charge of the matter and handed it over to the Ministry of Social Security for execution. The action originated from So Kwan-hui, the chairman of the Agricultural Committee of the Workers' Party of Korea, and Hwang Kum-suk, the chairman of the management committee of a collective farm. The two were former high-ranking officials of Kim Il Sung, but in 1997 they were publicly on charges of being " spies of American imperialism" and "stealing state property". Subsequently, the Ministry of Social Security declared that "we died because of So Kwan-hui" and criticized Hwang Kum-suk as a representative of the restoration of the landlord class.

Subsequently, the Ministry of Social Security established the "Deepening Group" (full name "Deepening the Handling of the Seo Kwan-hee Incident Group"), an agency with 8,000 elites from the Ministry of Social Security, hence the name "Deepening Group Incident". Senior officials from the Kim Il Sung era were sacrificed one after another. In the southwest, South Hwanghae party secret At the same time, Jang Song-taek recruited 15 people, including Lee Cheol, the instructor of the Ministry of Social Security; Chae Mun-deok, the director of the Political Bureau of the Ministry of Social Security; Hwang Yoon-moo, the chief of staff of the Ministry of Social Security; Kim Un -cheol, the minister of the Ministry of Housing and Urban-Rural Development; Ahn Yong-guk, the minister of the Ministry of General Affairs; Yoon Gye-soo; and Choi Deok-sung, to promote this matter.

== The purge ==
The "Deepening Group Incident" can be divided into two stages. The first stage occurred between 1997 and 1998, and the second stage occurred between 1998 and 2000. Some 25,000 people are thought to have been purged under the pretext of being spies, including civilians and high-ranking government officials, of whom approximately 10,000 were executed, and about 15,000 sent to concentration camps.

After the public executions of So Kwan-hui and Hwang Kum-suk, Ri Chol and Chae Mun-deok launched a large-scale purge under the pretext of searching for spies in the Korean War. This time, their main targets were elderly people who were not registered in the household register. Under severe torture, many elderly people were forced to confess their crimes. At the same time, the "Deepening Group" also implemented collective punishment, implicating more people. In the end, in the first phase of the purge, a total of 3,000 people were executed and more than 10,000 people were sent to the Yodok concentration camp. Chae, Yoon Gye-soo and Choi Deok-sung were awarded the title of Hero of the Republic by Kim Jong Il for their meritorious service in the purge.

After completing the first phase of the purge, Jang Song-taek and Chae began to carry out the second phase of the purge. During this phase of the purge, a total of 2,000 people, including 4 cabinet members, were executed, and 15,000 people were sent to concentration camps for labor reform.

During this period, due to personal grudges, they targeted Moon Song-soo, the Party Central Committee Secretary of the Workers' Party of Korea, and Su Yun-seok, the former Party Central Committee Secretary of Pyongyang, in 1998. According to a defector who had worked in the Ministry of Social Security, Moon Song-soo was a close aide to Kim Jong Il and had a grudge against Jang Song-taek for telling him about his personal misconduct. Su Yun-seok, on the other hand, had a conflict with Chae Mun-deok when he was the director of the Pyongyang Security Bureau because he reported Chae Mun-deok for being "lazy in his studies". In order to settle personal scores, Moon Song-soo and Su Yun-seok were tortured by electric shocks, ice torture, and having their fingernails and toenails pulled out during the investigation. This caused Su Yun-seok to become mentally unstable, and Moon Song-soo committed suicide as a result.

In the southwest, South Hwanghae party secretary, Pi Chang-rin and Kaesong city party secretary Kim Gi-sun were executed as remnants of the South Korean anti-communist group, and the Northwestern Youth League. Kim Jong Il unconditionally signed the list of executions put up by the deepening group.

== Conclusion ==
Soon after the news of Moon Sung-seok's suicide reached Kim Jong Il's ears, coupled with the serious protests that broke out in Songrim City, North Hwanghae Province, due to the dissatisfaction of the Hwanghae Steel Complex employees with the lack of rations and the tyranny of the judicial authorities, he was quite shocked. In order to quell the incident, Kim Jong Il subsequently sent personnel from the "4th Section of the Central Committee's Guidance Department" to investigate the Ministry of Social Security. As a result, the investigators found that the "Deepening Group" used torture and intimidation to force the suspects to confess. The investigators also pointed out the negative impact of the Deepening Group's actions on public sentiment in the investigation report submitted to Kim Jong Il.

Kim Jong Il then blamed Chae Mun-deok, claiming that he had impersonated him. Soon after, Chae was imprisoned in the Yodok concentration camp. Kim Jong Il also stripped Chae, Yoon Gye-soo and Choi Deok-sung of their hero titles. Most of the senior officials of the Social Security Department in charge of the Deepening Group, including Ri Chol, Hwang Yun-moo, Kim Un-chol, An Yong-guk, Yoon, and Choi Deok-sung, were listed as counter-revolutionaries and executed. Hwang Yun-moo, the chief of staff of the Security Department, was accused of counter-revolutionary crimes for criticizing the Workers' Party (the charges were later cleared during the investigation) and was involved in the Deepening Group. He died from injuries sustained during interrogation. The Deepening Group was disbanded, and an investigation team composed of the Korean People's Army Security Command, the State Security Department, and the Central Procuratorate was formed to deal with the Deepening Group's problems throughout North Korea. Of the more than 8,000 members involved in the Deepening Group, more than 6,000 were dismissed, imprisoned, or even executed.

== Aftermath ==
To appease the victims and their families in this incident, Kim Jong Il met with them and the government hosted a banquet for them at well-known Pyongyang hotels such as Okryu-gwan.

Kim Jong Il characterized the incident as members of the "Deepening Group" being "blinded by power, sowing discord between the Party and the people, and even using methods of torture more vicious than those of the Japanese colonizers". He also ordered the Ministry of Social Security to be renamed the Ministry of People's Security.
