= Give You My Heart =

Single by IU

from the album Crash Landing on You O.S.T
- Released: February 15, 2020
- Length: 4:40
- Label: EDAM Entertainment
- Songwriters: Nam Hye-seung; Park Jin-ho
- Producers: Nam Hye-seung; Park Jin-ho

IU singles chronology
"First Winter" (2019)	"Give You My Heart" (2020)	"Eight" (2020)

"Give You My Heart" (Korean: 마음을 드려요; ma-eum-eul deulyeoyo) is a song recorded by South Korean singer IU for the soundtrack of the drama series Crash Landing on You. It was released as a digital single on February 15, 2020 by EDAM Entertainment.

== Release ==
The song was released through various music portals, including iTunes.

== Track listing ==
No.	Title	Lyrics	Music	Length
1.	"Give You My Heart" (마음을 드려요)	Nam Hye-seung; Park Jin-ho	Nam Hye-seung; Park Jin-ho	4:40
2.	"Give You My Heart" (Instrumental)		Nam Hye-seung; Park Jin-ho	4:40
Total length:				9:00

== Commercial performance ==
"Give You My Heart" was ranked first on major streaming sites, such as Soribada, Genie Music and Bugs later earning a perfect all-kill certificate for reaching the top of all digital charts in Korea. The song debuted at number 71 on South Korea's Gaon Digital Chart for the chart issue dated February 9–15, 2020 rising and reaching number one on the following week.

== Charts ==
Chart (2020)	Peak position
South Korea (Gaon)	1
South Korea (K-pop Hot 100)	3
