= 1990s North Korean famine =

1994–1999 famine in North Korea

Arduous March
- Country: North Korea
- Location: Nationwide
- Period: 1994–1999
- Total deaths: 240,000 to 3.5 million
- Causes: Economic mismanagement, natural disasters, international sanctions, collapse of the Soviet bloc
- Relief: Food and humanitarian aid (1994–2002)
- Consequences: Militarization of economy, spread of limited market activity, food aid from various countries

Korean name
- Hangul: 고난의 행군
- Hanja: 苦難의行軍
- RR: Gonanui haenggun
- MR: Konanŭi haenggun

The North Korean famine (Korean: 조선기근), dubbed by the government as the Arduous March (고난의 행군), was a period of mass starvation together with a general economic crisis from 1994 to 1999 in North Korea. During this time there was an increase in defection from North Korea, which peaked towards the end of the famine period.

Economic mismanagement and the loss of Soviet support caused food production and imports to decline rapidly. A series of floods and droughts exacerbated the crisis. Another contributing background factor was the tightening of international sanctions. The North Korean government and its centrally planned system proved too inflexible to effectively curtail the disaster. North Korea attempted to obtain aid and commercial opportunities, but failed to receive initial attention. After repeatedly refusing international help, North Korea only sought international aid after 1995.

Estimates of the death toll vary widely. Out of a total population of approximately 22 million, somewhere between 240,000 and 3,500,000 North Koreans died from starvation or hunger-related illnesses, with the deaths peaking in 1997. A 2011 U.S. Census Bureau report estimated the number of excess deaths from 1993 to 2000 to be between 500,000 and 600,000.

== Background ==
In North Korea, the famine is referred to as the Arduous March. It was one of the most important events in the history of North Korea, because it forced the country and its people to change their lives in fundamental and unanticipated ways.

The terms "Arduous March", "March of Hardship", or "March of Suffering" became the official metaphor for the famine following a state propaganda campaign in 1993. The Rodong Sinmun urged the North Korean citizenry to invoke the memory of a propaganda fable from Kim Il Sung's time as a commander of a small group of anti-Japanese guerrilla fighters. The story, referred to as the Arduous March, is described as "fighting against thousands of enemies in 20 degrees below zero, braving a heavy snowfall and starvation, the red flag fluttering in front of the rank".

As part of this state campaign, uses of words such as 'famine' and 'hunger' were banned because they implied government failure. Citizens who said deaths were due to the famine could be in serious trouble with the authorities. A special group (the Simhwajo) was set up to purge the citizens responsible.

Less than 20% of North Korea's mountainous terrain is arable land. Much of the land is frost-free for only six months, and only one crop can be grown on it per year. The country has never been self-sufficient in food production, and several experts considered it unrealistic and economically imprudent for the country to aim for self-sufficiency rather than trade. Due to North Korea's terrain, farming is mainly concentrated along the flatlands of the four western coastal provinces, where there is a longer growing season, level land, substantial rainfall, and well-irrigated soil conducive to the high cultivation of crops. Along with the western coastal provinces, fertile land also runs through the eastern seaboard provinces. However, interior provinces such as Chagang and Ryanggang are too mountainous, dry, and cold to support food crop farming.

In the 1980s, the Soviet Union embarked on a campaign of radical reform known as perestroika. It began to demand that North Korea repay the Soviet Union for all of the past and current aid which it sent to North Korea – amounts which North Korea could not repay. By 1991, the Soviet Union dissolved alongside the Eastern Bloc, ending all aid and trade concessions, such as cheap oil. Without Soviet aid, the flow of imports to the North Korean agricultural sector ended, and the government proved to be too inflexible to respond. Energy imports fell by 75%. The economy went into a downward spiral, with imports and exports falling in tandem. Flooded coal mines required electricity to operate pumps, and the shortage of coal worsened the shortage of electricity. Agriculture reliant on electrically powered irrigation systems, artificial fertilizers and pesticides was hit particularly hard by the economic collapse.

Most North Koreans had experienced nutritional deprivation long before the mid-1990s. The country had reached the limits of its productive capacity, and could not respond effectively to exogenous shocks.

North Korea's state trading companies emerged as an alternative means of conducting foreign economic relations. From the mid-1980s, these state trading companies became important conduits of funding for the regime, with a percentage of all revenues going "directly into Kim Jong Il's personal accounts... [which have been] used to secure and maintain the loyalty of the senior leadership".

The country soon imposed austerity measures, dubbed the "eat two meals a day" campaign. These measures proved inadequate in stemming the economic decline. According to Professor Hazel Smith of Cranfield University:

the methods of the past that had produced short-to medium-term gains might have continued producing further small economic benefits if the Soviet Union and the Eastern bloc had remained and continued to supply oil, technology, and expertise.

Without help from these countries, North Korea was unable to prevent the coming famine. For a time, China filled the gap left by the Soviet Union's collapse and propped up North Korea's food supply with significant aid. By 1993, China was supplying North Korea with 77 percent of its fuel imports and 68 percent of its food imports. In 1993, China faced its own grain shortfalls and need for hard currency, and it sharply cut aid to North Korea.

In 1997, So Kwan-hui, the North Korean Minister for Agriculture, was accused of spying for the United States government and sabotaging North Korean agriculture on purpose, thus leading to the famine. As a result, he was publicly executed by firing squad by the North Korean government.

== Causes ==
=== Floods and drought ===
The economic decline and failed policies provided the context for the famine, but the floods of the mid-1990s were the immediate cause. The floods in July and August 1995 were described as being "of biblical proportions" by independent observers. They were estimated to affect as much as 30 percent of the country.

As devastating floods ravaged the country in 1995, arable land, harvests, grain reserves, and social and economic infrastructure were destroyed. The United Nations Department of Humanitarian Affairs reported that "between 30 July and 18 August 1995, torrential rains caused devastating floods in the Democratic People's Republic of Korea (DPRK). In one area, in Pyongsan county in North Hwanghae province, 877 millimetres or 35 inches of rain were recorded to have fallen in just seven hours, an intensity of precipitation unheard of in this area... water flow in the engorged Amnok River, which runs along the Korea/China border, was estimated at 4.8 billion tons over a 72-hour period. Flooding of this magnitude had not been recorded in at least 70 years".

The major issues created by the floods were not only the destruction of crop lands and harvests, but also the loss of emergency grain reserves, because many of them were stored underground. According to the United Nations, the floods of 1994 and 1995 destroyed around 1.5 million tons of grain reserves, and the Centers for Disease Control and Prevention stated that 1.2 million tons (or 12%) of grain production was lost in the 1995 flood. There were further major floods in 1996 and a drought in 1997.

North Korea lost an estimated 85% of its power generation capacity due to flood damage to infrastructure such as hydropower plants, coal mines, and supply and transport facilities. UN officials reported that the power shortage from 1995 to 1997 was not due to a shortage of oil, because only two out of a total of two dozen power stations were dependent on heavy fuel oil for power generation, and these were supplied by KEDO (the Korean Peninsula Energy Development Organization). About 70% of power generated in the DPRK came from hydropower sources, and the serious winter-spring droughts of 1996 and 1997 (and a breakdown on one of the Yalu River's large hydro turbines) created major shortages throughout the country at that time, severely cutting back railway transportation (which was almost entirely dependent on electric power), which in turn resulted in coal supply shortages to the coal-fueled power stations which supplied the remaining 20% of power in the country.

=== Failure of the public distribution system ===
North Korea's vulnerability to the floods and famine was exacerbated by the failure of the public distribution system. The regime refused to pursue policies that would have allowed food imports and distribution without discrimination to all regions of the country. During the famine, the urban working class of the cities and towns of the eastern provinces of the country was hit particularly hard. The distribution of food reflected basic principles of stratification of the communist system.

Foreign observers claimed food was distributed to people according to their political standing and their degree of loyalty to the state.

The structure is as follows (the World Food Program considers 600 grams of cereal per day to be less than a "survival ration"):

Category	Amount allocated
Privileged industrial worker	900 grams/day
Ordinary worker	700 grams/day
Retired citizen	300 grams/day
2~4-year-old	200 grams/day

However, the extended period of food shortages put a strain on the system, and it spread the amount of available food allocations thinly across the groups, affecting 62% of the population who were entirely reliant on public distribution. The system was feeding only 6% of the population by 1997.

Year	Changes
1987	Reduced 10%
1992	Reduced another 10%
1994	470 grams/day down 420 grams/day
1997	128 grams/day

A 2008 study found no variation in children's nutrition between counties that had experienced flooding and those that had not.

=== Long-term causes ===
The famine was also a result of the culmination of a long series of government decisions that accrued slowly over decades. The attempt to follow a closed-economic model caused the regime to abandon the possibility of engaging in international markets and importing food and instead attempt to reduce demand, e.g., through the 1991 "Let's eat two meals a day" campaign. Attempts to increase exports and earn foreign exchange through the Rajin Sonbong free trade zone in 1991 were unsuccessful – it was located in the most isolated part of North Korea and lacked a clear legal foundation for international business. The North Korean government also missed the opportunity for the short-term option to borrow from abroad to finance food imports after defaulting on foreign loans in the 1970s.

== Healthcare ==
Inadequate medical supplies, water and environmental contamination, frequent power failures, and outdated training led to a health care crisis that added to the overall devastation. According to a 1997 UNICEF delegation, hospitals were clean but wards were devoid of even the most rudimentary supplies and equipment – sphygmomanometers, thermometers, scales, kidney dishes, spatulas, IV administration sets, etc. The mission saw numerous patients being treated with homemade beer bottle IV sets, which were not sterile. There was an absence of oral rehydration solution and even the most basic drugs such as analgesics and antibiotics.

== Widespread malnutrition ==
With the widespread destruction of harvests and food reserves, the majority of the population became desperate for food, including areas well established in food production. In 1996, it was reported that people in "the so-called better-off parts of the country, were so hungry that they ate the maize cobs before the crop was fully developed". This reduced expected production of an already ravaged harvest by 50%.

People everywhere were affected by the crisis, regardless of gender, affiliation or social class. Child malnutrition, indicated as being severely underweight, was found at 3% in 1987, 14% in 1997 and 7% in 2002.

Rice and maize production of North Korea from 1989 to 1997
Year	1989	1990	1991	1992	1993	1994	1995	1996	1997
Rice milled (million tons)	3.24	3.36	3.07	3.34	3.56	2.18	1.40	0.98	1.10
Corn harvested (million tons)	4.34	3.90	4.20	3.72	3.94	3.55	1.37	0.83	1.01

=== Military ===
Songun is North Korea's "Military First" policy, which prioritizes the Korean People's Army in affairs of state and allocates national resources to the "army first". Even though the armed forces were given priority for the distribution of food, this did not mean that they all received generous rations.

The army was supposed to find ways to grow food to feed itself and to develop industries that would permit it to purchase food and supplies from abroad. The rations received by military personnel were very basic, and "ordinary soldiers of the million-strong army often remained hungry, as did their families, who did not receive preferential treatment simply because a son or daughter was serving in the armed forces".

=== Women ===
Women suffered significantly due to the gendered structure of North Korean society, which deemed women responsible for obtaining food, water and fuel for their families, which often included extended families. Simultaneously, women had the highest participation rate in the workforce of any country in the world, calculated at 89%. Therefore, women had to remain in the workforce and obtain supplies for their families.

Pregnant and nursing women faced severe difficulties in staying healthy; maternal mortality rates increased to approximately 41 per 1000, while simple complications such as anemia, hemorrhage and premature birth became common due to vitamin deficiency. It was estimated that the number of births declined by about 0.3 children per woman during that period.

=== Children ===
Children, especially those under two years old, were most affected by both the famine and the poverty of the period. The World Health Organization reported death rates for children at 93 out of every 1000, while those of infants were cited at 23 out of every 1000. Undernourished mothers found it difficult to breast-feed. No suitable alternative to the practice was available. Infant formula was not produced locally, and only a small amount of it was imported.

The famine resulted in a population of homeless, migrant children known as Kotjebi.

== Estimated number of deaths ==
The exact number of deaths during the acute phase of the crisis, from 1994 to 1998, is uncertain. According to the researcher Andrei Lankov, both the extreme high and low ends of the estimates are considered inaccurate. In 2001 and 2007, independent groups of researchers have estimated that between 600,000 and 1 million people, or 3 to 5 percent of the pre-crisis population, died due to starvation and hunger-related illness. In 1998, US Congressional staffers who visited the country reported that: "Therefore, we gave a range of estimates, from 300,000 to 800,000 dying per year, peaking in 1997. That would put the total number of deaths from the North Korean food shortage at between 900,000 and 2.4 million between 1995 and 1998". W. Courtland Robinson's team found 245,000 "excess" deaths (an elevated mortality rate as a result of premature death), 12 percent of the population in one affected region. Taking those results as the upper limit and extrapolating across the entire North Korean population across the country's provinces produces an upper limit of 2,000,000 famine-related deaths. Andrew Natsios and others estimated 2–3 million deaths.

According to research by the U.S. Census Bureau in 2011, the likely range of excess deaths between 1993 and 2000 was between 500,000 and 600,000, and a total of 600,000 to 1,000,000 excess deaths from the year 1993 to the year 2008.

== Black markets ==
At the same time, the years of famine were also marked by a dramatic revival of illegal, private market activities. Smuggling across the border boomed, and up to 250,000 North Koreans moved to China. Amartya Sen had mentioned bad governance as one of the structural and economic problems which contributed to the famine, but it seems that the famine also led to widespread government corruption, which nearly resulted in the collapse of old government controls and regulations.

When fuel became scarce while demand for logistics rose, so-called servi-cha (Korean: 써비차; MR: ssŏbich'a, "service cars") operations formed, wherein an entrepreneur provides transportation to businesses, institutions and individuals without access to other means of transportation, while the car is formally owned by a legitimate enterprise or unit that also provides transportation permits.

With the desperation derived from famine and informal trade and commercialization, North Koreans developed their black market, and moreover, they were surviving by adapting. Andrei Lankov has described the process as the "natural death of North Korean Stalinism".

The average official salary in 2011 was equivalent to US$2 per month. However, the actual monthly income could be estimated to be around US$15 as most North Koreans were earning money from illegal small businesses; trade, subsistence farming, and handicrafts. As of 2011, the illegal economy was largely dominated by women. That was because men were expected to attend their places of official work despite most of the factories being non-functional.

== International response ==
Initial assistance to North Korea started as early as 1990, with small-scale support from religious groups in South Korea and assistance from UNICEF. In August 1995, North Korea made an official request for humanitarian aid and the international community responded accordingly:

Food aid by year (thousands of tons)
Donor	1995	1996	1997	1998	1999	2000	2001	2002	2003	2004	2005	2006	2007	2008	2009	2010	2011	Total
S. Korea	150	3	60	48	12	352	198	458	542	407	493	80	431	59		23		3,314
China		100	150	151	201	280	420	330	212	132	451	207	264		116			3,015
U.S.A.		22	193	231	589	351	319	222	47	105	28			171	121	1		2,400
Others	394	380	501	361	198	248	571	168	143	201	125	20	26	145	61	71	47	3,661
Total	544	505	904	791	1,000	1,231	1,508	1,178	944	845	1,097	307	721	375	298	95	47	12,390

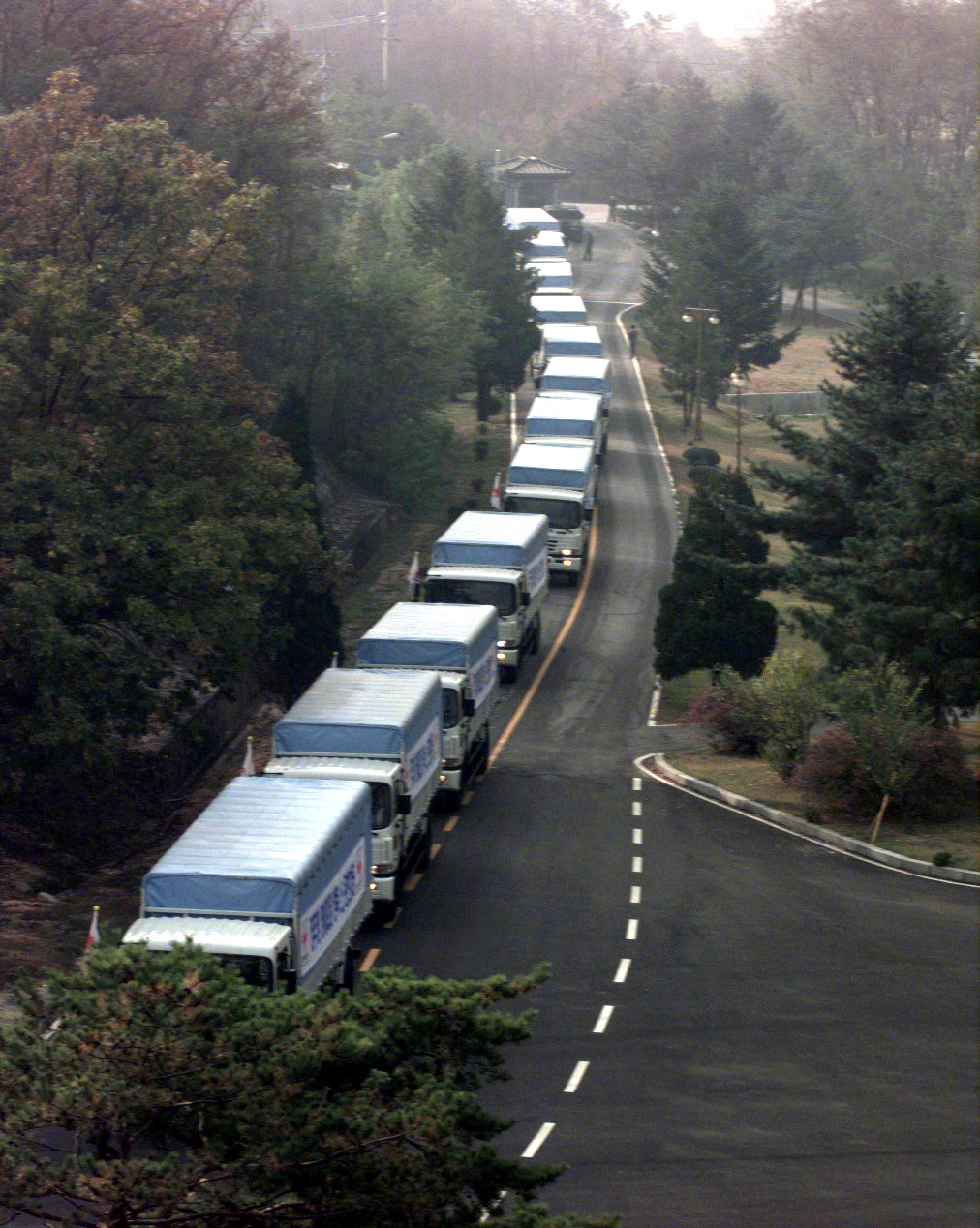
A South Korean relief caravan of 501 cattle in 50 vehicles bound for North Korea, Oct. 27, 1998.

Beginning in 1996, the U.S. also started shipping food aid to North Korea through the United Nations World Food Programme (WFP) to combat the famine. Shipments peaked in 1999 at nearly 600,000 tons making the U.S. the largest foreign aid donor to the country at the time. Under the Bush administration, aid was drastically reduced year after year from 320,000 tons in 2001 to 28,000 tons in 2005. The Bush administration was criticized for "using food as a weapon" during talks over the North's nuclear weapons program, but insisted the U.S. Agency for International Development (USAID) criteria were the same for all countries and the situation in North Korea had "improved significantly since its collapse in the mid-1990s".

South Korea (before the Lee Myung-bak government) and China remained the largest donors of food aid to North Korea. The U.S. objects to this manner of donating food due to the North Korean state's refusal to allow donor representatives to supervise the distribution of their aid inside North Korea. Such supervision would ensure that aid does not get seized and sold by well-connected elites or diverted to feed North Korea's large military. In 2005, South Korea and China together provided almost 1 million tons of food aid, each contributing half.

Humanitarian aid from North Korea's neighbors has been cut off at times in order to provoke North Korea into resuming boycotted talks. For example, South Korea decided to "postpone consideration" of 500,000 tons of rice for the North in 2006, but the idea of providing food as a clear incentive (as opposed to resuming "general humanitarian aid") has been avoided. There have also been aid disruptions due to widespread theft of railway cars used by mainland China to deliver food relief.

== Post-famine developments ==
As of 2019, North Korea had not yet resumed reliable self-sufficiency in food production and as a result, it periodically relies on external food aid from South Korea, China, the United States, Japan, the European Union and other countries.

In 2002, North Korea requested that food supplies no longer be delivered. In 2005, the World Food Programme (WFP) reported that famine conditions were in imminent danger of returning to North Korea, and the government was reported to have mobilized millions of city-dwellers in order to help rice farmers. In 2012, the WFP reported that food would be sent to North Korea as soon as possible. The food would first be processed by a local processor and it would then be delivered directly to North Korean citizens.

Agricultural production increased from about 2.7 million metric tons in 1997 to 4.2 million metric tons in 2004. In 2008, food shortages continued to be a problem in North Korea, although less so than in the mid to late 1990s. Flooding in 2007 and reductions in food aid exacerbated the problem.

In 2011, during a visit to North Korea, former US President Jimmy Carter reported that one third of children in North Korea were malnourished and stunted in their growth because of a lack of food. He also said that the North Korean government had reduced daily food intake from 5,900 to 2,900 kJ (1,400 to 700 kcal) in 2011. Some scholars believed that North Korea was purposefully exaggerating the food shortage, aiming to receive additional food supplies for its planned mass-celebrations of Kim Il Sung's 100th birthday in 2012 by means of foreign aid.

Escaped North Koreans reported in September 2010 that starvation had returned to the nation. North Korean pre-school children were reported to be an average of three to four centimetres (1 1/4–1 1/2 in) shorter than South Koreans, which some researchers believe can only be explained by conditions of famine and malnutrition. Most people only eat meat on public holidays, namely Kim Jong Il's birthday, the Day of the Shining Star on February 16 and Kim Il Sung's birthday, the Day of the Sun on April 15.

One report by the Tokyo Shimbun in April 2012 claimed that since the death of Kim Jong Il in December 2011, around 20,000 people had starved to death in South Hwanghae Province. Another report by the Japanese Asia Press agency in January 2013 claimed that in North and South Hwanghae provinces more than 10,000 people had died of famine. Reports of sporadic cannibalism were made in The Sunday Times and other international outlets.

On the other hand, the WFP has reported malnutrition and food shortages, but not famine. In 2016, UN Committee on the Rights of the Child reported a steady decline in the infant mortality rate since 2008. An academic analysis in 2016 found that the situation had greatly improved since the 1990s and that North Korea's levels of health and nutrition were on par with other developing countries. In 2017, the analyst Andrei Lankov argued that previous predictions of a return to famine were unfounded, and that the days of starvation had long since passed.

A survey in 2017 found that the famine had skewed North Korea's demography, impacting particularly male babies. Women aged 20–24 made up 4% of the population, while men in the same age group made up only 2.5%. Chronic or recurrent malnutrition dropped from 28 percent in 2012 to 19 percent in 2017.

In June 2019, after a report made by the United Nations stated that North Korea had experienced the worst harvests in over a decade along with severe food shortages that affected 40% of North Korea's population, South Korea enacted a plan to provide US$8 million worth of food aid to North Korea. The South Korean government's aid to North Korea is widely viewed as having a political agenda of improving inter-Korean relations, despite the South's government's insistence on separating the aid from politics.

== See also ==
- Agriculture in North Korea
- Economy of North Korea
- Foreign relations of North Korea
- History of North Korea
- Human rights in North Korea
- Japan–North Korea relations
- Kotjebi
- North Korea–China relations
- North Korea–South Korea relations
- North Korea–Russia relations
- North Korea–United States relations
- Politics of North Korea
- Potato production in North Korea
- Special Period
- Sunshine Policy
- World Food Programme
