= Kotjebi =

Homeless children in North Korea

Kotjebi, kotchebi, or ggotjebi (Korean: 꽃제비; RR: kkotjebi; MR: kkotchebi; lit. 'flowering swallows') is a Korean term for North Korean homeless people, given because of the Kotjebi's constant search for food and shelter. The term was originally used in reference to homeless children. The homeless elderly are known by the related term Noin Kotjebi.

The kotjebi are not officially recognized in North Korea, with any mention of the term being prohibited in state publications and documents. The kotjebi are a stateless generation, formed through famine and economic crisis, facing extreme poverty and no human rights guarantees. This group faces unique challenges in their daily lives, scavenging for food and working for low wages.

== Origins and status ==
The orphaned kotjebi first appeared en masse in the mid-1990s in the wake of the North Korean famine, when the food production and distribution system collapsed. Also called the "Arduous March", it was triggered by the combination of government mismanagement, loss of Soviet Union support, and severe weather conditions. It caused widespread food shortages, industry collapse, and economic stagnation. An estimated one million North Koreans died due to the widespread famine. In an effort to "stabilize the livelihood of vagrants throughout the country", the North Korean government established special "Children's Detention Camps" in 1995, which were effectively rundown apartments. Because of poor conditions in the detention camps, children died of malnutrition.

Many crossed into China seeking necessities like food and medicine, along with job opportunities. North Korea's restricted economy could no longer support its population. North Korean children often find themselves separated from their families when crossing into China. Some children are later abandoned by their families due to the dangers of state persecution. There are even cases of children born to North Korean mothers and Chinese fathers, another reason for abandonment. This created the generation of displaced individuals, the kotjebi.

== Livelihood ==
Kotjebi children often obtain food through scavenging, gathering in groups or alone to beg and in extreme cases pickpocket. The diet of the kotjebi consists mainly of grass soup, wild vegetable porridge, and grass roots. The children will also collect recyclables to sell and perform small low-wage tasks like cleaning to earn money. Some of them may form loose family-like groups for mutual support, in which older children will often take on leadership roles. Their living arrangements pose significant threats to their livelihood, living in tents, makeshift shelters, construction sites or on the streets.

== Human rights ==
There are several challenges the kotjebi face in accessing basic human rights, with the first being their statelessness. This limits their access to health care, education, and other basic services. Many children are exploited in dangerous and unregulated workforces. North Korean and Chinese forces often ignore and neglect kotjebi children. China classifies them as illegal economic migrants instead of refugees, leading to frequent deportations. NGOs face significant difficulties in providing aid and relief to these children due to political sensitivities surrounding North Korean defectors.

== See also ==
- Human rights in North Korea
- Street child
- Orphans in the Soviet Union
- Statelessness
