= Park Sung-woo (actor) =

South Korean actor (born 1988)

- Born: Park Sung-woo; 7 May 1988 (age 38); Bucheon, Gyeonggi, South Korea
- Other name: Park Sung-wu
- Education: Sejong University (Department of Film Arts)
- Occupations: Actor; model
- Years active: 2010–present
- Agent: HIM Entertainment
- Known for: I Have Three Boyfriends (2019); Oh! Dear Half-Basement Goddesses; Produce 101: Season 2

Park Sung-woo (born June 7, 1988) is a South Korean actor and model. He is best known for his main role in I Have Three Boyfriends, Because It's My First Time and Oh! Dear Half-Basement Goddesses.

== Early life and education ==
He was born on May 7, 1988, in Bucheon, Gyeonggi. He completed his studies from Sejong University.

== Career ==
He made his debut as actor in 2010, he did a supporting role in film Pretty Romance. In 2011 he did again a supporting in film A Function and after two years, he did a lead role in short film High Fever in 2013 that gained him attention. In 2016 he starred in web drama, Unrequited Love playing a supporting role. He joined Produce 101, he was the oldest trainee on the show. He was a competitor on Produce 101 Season 2, he made it to ranked 37 in episode 8 but was eliminated. He then sang some songs on Produce 101 such as It's Me (Pick Me) in 2017. He was invited on Superman Family program he made his appearance in Remember Me and the same he was invited to variety show Kwang Seungjun's Coolkkadang. He signed with agency HIM Entertainment and he did modeling for different magazines and comerciales. He then starred in Crushes: Special Edition in 2017 playing a supporting role. He played his first lead role in web drama Oh! Dear Half-Basement Goddesses which attracted attention towards him. In 2018 he starred in drama Because It's My First Time by playing a lead role as Park Sung-woo he was praised for his acting. In 2019 he starred along Kim Ji-eun in drama I Have Three Boyfriends.

== Filmography ==
=== Television ===
Year	Title	Role	Ref.
2016	Unrequited Love: Special Edition	Park Sung-woo	
2017	Produce 101 Season 2	Contestant	
2017	Crushes: Special Edition	Jae Dong-yong	
2017	Oh! Dear Half-Basement Goddesses	Ko Jae-woo	
2018	Because It's My First Time	Park Sung-woo	
2019	I Have Three Boyfriends	Min-joon	
2020	Today's Office Tomorrow's Romance	Jung-kook	
2022	You & It	Seong Gyu-jin	
2024	Knight Flower	Cho Sung-hoon	
2024	Missing Crown Prince	Heo Jin-soo	

=== Film ===
Year	Title	Role	Language	Ref.
2010	Petty Romance	Jeon-woong	Korean	
2011	A Function	Man	Korean	
2013	High Fever	Tae-joong	Korean	
