= Cho Hye-jung =

South Korean actress (b. 1992)

Cho Hae-jung
- 조혜정
- Born: December 22, 1992 (age 33); Seoul, South Korea
- Occupation: Actress
- Years active: 2014–present
- Agent: BH Entertainment
- Father: Cho Jae-hyun

Korean name
- Hangul: 조혜정
- RR: Jo Hyejeong
- MR: Cho Hyejŏng

Cho Hae-jung (Korean: 조혜정; born December 22, 1992) is a South Korean actress. She is known for her role in 2017 TV series Weightlifting Fairy Kim Bok-joo.

== Early life and education ==
Cho was born to Cho Jae-hyun and his college sweetheart on December 22, 1992. She has a brother, Cho Soo-hoon, a short-track speed skater who is three years older. Cho attended the American Academy of Dramatic Arts in New York.

== Career ==
On April 10, 2017, Cho signed with Jellyfish Entertainment.

Due to her father's admission of sexual misconduct, Cho went on hiatus from 2018 until her comeback in 2022 with Our Blues.

== Filmography ==
=== Films ===
Year	Title	Role	Notes
2014	Independent Film Hot Girl (독립 영화 뜨거운 소녀)	Lead	Directed by Jeon Hye-rim
2018	The End (숲속의 부부)	High School girl	
2018	Soldier's Memories (오장군의 발톱)	Ggot-Boon	

=== Television series ===
Year	Title	Role	Notes/Ref.
2014	Quiz of God 4	Jung Mi-hyang	Episode 1
2015	My First Time	Oh Ga-rin	
2015	The Alchemist (연금술사)	Lee Ah-ri	
2015	Imaginary Cat	Oh Na-woo	Lead
2016	Cinderella with Four Knights	Hong Ja-yeong	
2017	Weightlifting Fairy Kim Bok-joo	Jung Nan-hee	
2017	Go Back	Chun Seol	
2017	Moonlight Couple (달빛남녀)	Seo-jin	
2022	Our Blues	Dal-i	
2026	Yumi's Cells Season 3	Baek Na-hee	

=== Television programs ===
Year	Title	Role	Notes
2017	Happy Together	Guest	Episode 488
