= Hyodo Chicken =

Korean fried chicken chain in South Korea

Restaurant information
- Established: May 8, 2018
- Food type: Korean fried chicken
- Location: Seoul, South Korea
- Website: www.hyodochicken.net

Hyodo Chicken (Korean: 효도치킨; lit. 'filial chicken') is a Korean fried chicken chain restaurant in Seoul, South Korea. It first opened on May 8, 2018, on Parents' Day in South Korea.

The chain is operated by Michelin-starred chefs Min Goo Kang (강민구) and Chang Ho Shin (신창호). Kang worked at the restaurant Mingles and Shin at the restaurant Joo Ok. By 2021, the restaurant had three locations: in Naeja-dong, Nonhyeon-dong, and in Hannam-dong. Several of the dishes served in the chain are novel, and incorporate tastes of various Korean banchan (side dishes). The restaurant also reportedly serves noodles.

== See also ==
- List of Korean restaurants
- List of Michelin-starred restaurants in South Korea
