= Kojima =

Kojima, Ko-jima, may refer to:

== People ==
- Kojima (surname)

== Places ==
- Kojima District, Okayama, Japan
- Kojima Village, Matsumae, Hokkaido, Japan
- Kojima Domain, Suruga Province, Honshu, Japan; an Edo-period domain
- Kojima Peninsula, a peninsula on the island of Honshū, Japan

=== Islands ===
- Kōjima, an island known for wild monkeys in Miyazaki Prefecture, Japan
- Kojima, an uninhabited island belonging to the Tokara Islands, in the southern part of Kagoshima Prefecture, Japan
- Kojima, an alternative spelling of Kutsujima island off Kyoto coast, Japan
- Kojima (Hokkaido), an uninhabited island of Oshima subprefecture of Hokkaidō, Japan, in the Sea of Japan; also called "Ko-jima"
- Hachijō-kojima, a small uninhabited volcanic island in the Philippine Sea, administered in Hachijō, Tokyo, Japan; also called "Ko-jima"

=== Facilities and structures ===
- Kojima Station, Kurashiki, Okayama Prefecture, Japan; a train station
- Kojima Interchange, Kurashiki, Seto-Chūō Expressway, Japan; a highway interchange

=== Extraterrestrial locations ===
- 70P/Kojima (Comet Kojima), a periodic comet with a period of 7 years, the 70th periodic comet registered
- 4886 Kojima (Asteroid Kojima), an asteroid in the Asteroid Belt, the 4886th asteroid registered

== Groups, companies, organizations ==
- Kojima Productions, a prominent Japanese video game development studio
- Kojima Engineering, a Japanese Formula One constructor
- Kojima (restaurant), a South Korean sushi restaurant
- Kojima, a Japanese electronics retailer

== Other uses ==
- Battle of Kojima (児島合戦), during the Genpei War, in 1184
- MS Kojima Maru, a merchant ship, the Kojima-maru

== See also ==
- The dictionary definition of 小島 at Wiktionary
- The dictionary definition of こじま at Wiktionary
- Jima (disambiguation)
- Ko (disambiguation)
