= Restaurant Allen =

Fine dining restaurant in Seoul, South Korea

- Interactive map of Restaurant Allen

Restaurant information
- Established: 2021
- Head chef: Allen Suh
- Food type: Contemporary cuisine
- Rating: 2 Michelin stars
- Location: 2F Center field EAST E205, 231 Teheran-ro, Gangnam District, Seoul, 06142, South Korea
- Coordinates: 37.5035°N 127.0418°E

Restaurant Allen (Korean: 레스토랑 알렌) is a fine dining restaurant in Seoul, South Korea. It opened in 2021. The restaurant received two Michelin stars in 2024, and it retained its two-star status in 2025.

The restaurant is named for its owner-chef, Allen Suh (Korean: 서현민; RR: Seo Hyeonmin). Suh previously worked at the Michelin-starred restaurant Eleven Madison Park in New York City, United States, and previously was head chef of L'Impression, a French restaurant in Seoul that also received Michelin stars. The restaurant has a farm-to-table concept, and dishes change seasonally depending on what ingredients are available. The restaurant borrows from various culinary traditions, in particular French and Korean cuisine. The restaurant reportedly has its own wine bar.

== See also ==
- List of Michelin-starred restaurants in South Korea
