= Kojima (surname) =

- Language: Japanese

Other names
- Variant forms: 児島; 児嶋; 小島; 小嶋

Kojima (児島, 児嶋, 小島, 小嶋, lit. "small island") is a Japanese surname.

== Notable people ==
- Akiko Kojima (児島 明子; born 1936), Japanese model, who was the first Miss Universe to originate from Asia
- Ayami Kojima (小島 文美), Japanese artist, who contributed to Castlevania
- Fumi Kojima (児島 フミ; 1916-1996), Japanese discus thrower
- Gyokuhō Kojima (児嶋 玉鳳; 1907–1934), Japanese artist
- Haruna Kojima (小嶋 陽菜; born 1988), singer and actress, and member of the Japanese girl band AKB48
- Hideo Kojima (小島 秀夫; born 1963), Japanese video game designer formerly employed by Konami
- Ippei Kojima (小島 一平; born 1944), Japanese badminton player
- Kazuya Kojima (児嶋 一哉; born 1972), Japanese comedian and actor
- Keitatsu Kojima (小島 圭巽; born 2001), Japanese footballer
- Ken-Ichi Kojima (1930–1971), Japanese-American geneticist
- Kō Kojima (小島 功; 1928–2015), Japanese artist
- Mako Kojima (小嶋 真子; born 1997), Japanese singer and member of the girl group AKB48
- Miyuki Kojima (児島 みゆき; born 1952), Japanese actress and singer
- Ruriko Kojima (小島 瑠璃子; born 1993), Japanese television personality, gravure idol and sportscaster
- Ryosuke Kojima (小島 亨介; born 1997), Japanese footballer
- Satoshi Kojima (小島 聡; born 1970), Japanese professional wrestler
- Shinichi Kojima (小島 伸一; born 1978), Japanese mixed martial artist
- Suguru Kojima (小島 卓; born 1939), Japanese politician, Mayor of Shiraoka, Saitama
- Takashi Kojima (小島 卓; born 1973), Japanese football player
- Toy Kojima (小嶋 斗偉; born 1999), Japanese professional wrestler
- Yorihiko Kojima (小島 順彦; born 1941), president & CEO of Mitsubishi Corporation (2004- )
- Yoshio Kojima (小島 義雄; born 1980), Japanese comedian (tarento)
- Youki Kojima (born 1991), Japanese music producer

== Fictional ==
- Genta Kojima (or George Kojima), a fictional character in Case Closed/Detective Conan
- Yoshiyuki Kojima, a fictional character in Chobits
- Yuki Kojima, a fictional character in Whistle!
- Kojima, a fictional character in Teenage Mutant Ninja Turtles
- Kojima is a type of nuclear particle in the Armored Core video-game series.
- Hajiri Kojima, fictional detective

== See also ==
- Kojima (disambiguation)
