= Palate (restaurant) =

Fine dining restaurant in Busan, South Korea

Restaurant information
- Established: December 2019
- Rating: 1 Michelin star
- Location: 3F, 66-30 Bunpo-ro, Nam District, Busan, 48576, South Korea
- Coordinates: 35.1315°N 129.1197°E
- Website: www.palatebusan.com (in English and Korean)

Palate (Korean: 팔레트) is a fine dining restaurant in Busan, South Korea. It first opened in December 2019. In February 2024, the first year the Michelin Guide was issued for Busan, the restaurant received its first Michelin Star, and it maintained the one-star distinction in 2025.

The head chef is Kim Jae-hoon, a Busan native. Kim started to work in restaurants at age 25. He moved to study and work in Australia in 2011. He would spend seven years there, and returned to South Korea afterwards. Before opening Palate, he worked as a sous chef at Zero Complex, a Michelin-starred restaurant in Seoul. The restaurant reportedly opened a month before the COVID-19 pandemic hit South Korea. The restaurant reportedly faced difficulties due to this.

The restaurant reportedly combines flavors from Western and East Asian culinary traditions. The building reportedly faces out onto the city's Gwangan Bridge.

== See also ==
- List of Michelin starred restaurants in South Korea
