= Son Jong-won =

South Korean chef (born 1984)

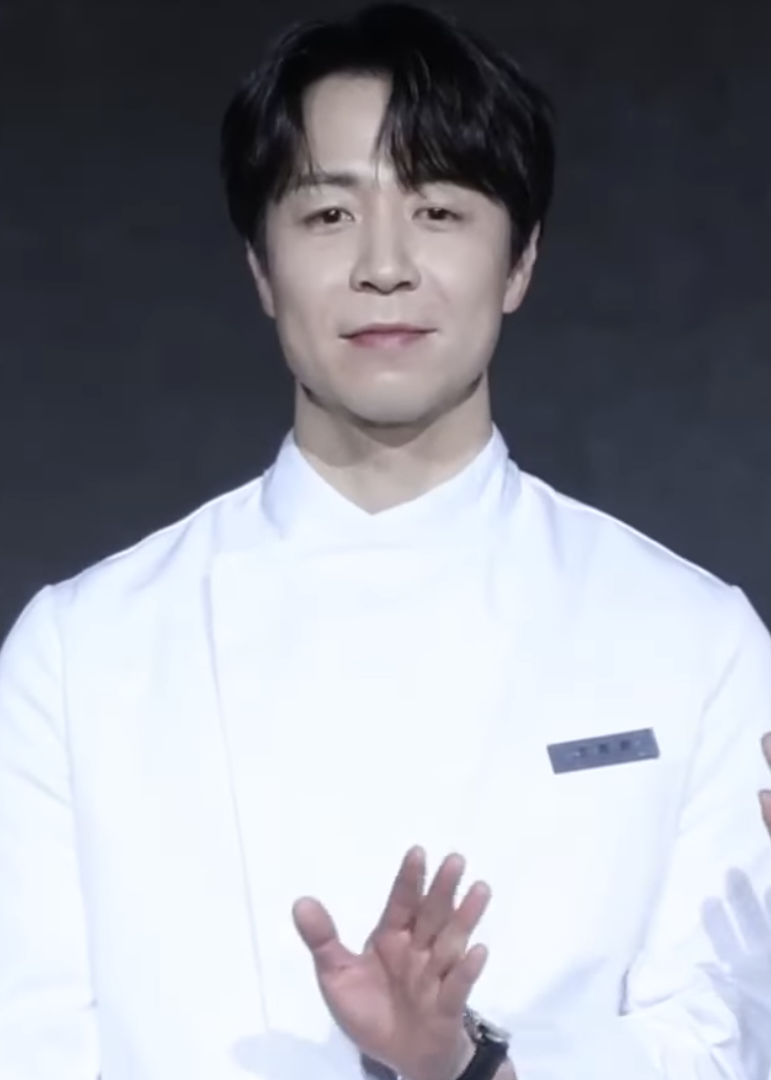
- Son in December 2025
- Born: March 19, 1984 (age 42); Seoul, South Korea
- Culinary career
- Cooking style: Haute cuisine; Contemporary; Korean
- Current restaurants
- L'Amant Secret; Eatanic Garden

Korean name
- Hangul: 손종원
- RR: Son Jongwon
- MR: Son Chongwŏn

Son Jong-won (Korean: 손종원; born March 19, 1984) is a South Korean chef known for leading L'Amant Secret and Eatanic Garden, two one-Michelin-starred restaurants in Seoul. He is a regular chef cast on Please Take Care of My Refrigerator and participated as a White Spoon competitor on Culinary Class Wars Season 2.

== Early life and education ==
Son Jong-won was born in 1984 and spent part of his youth studying in the United States. He attended All Saints' Day School before enrolling at the Rose-Hulman Institute of Technology in Indiana to study civil engineering. During his fourth year of engineering studies, Son's interests shifted toward culinary arts after coming across students of the Culinary Institute of America in New York City wearing chef's uniforms.

== Culinary career ==
After deciding to pursue a culinary career, Son gained early professional experience working at several Michelin-starred restaurants, including Benu, Quince, and Coi in the United States, as well as Noma in Denmark. In 2018, he returned to South Korea and became the head chef of L'Amant Secret in Seoul, which received its first Michelin star in 2021 under his leadership. He later became the head chef of Eatanic Garden, which has also been awarded one Michelin star.

In November 2023, Son was named one of the New Talents of the Year 2024 by the La Liste culinary guide at an awards ceremony in Paris, making him the only Korean chef to win the title that year.

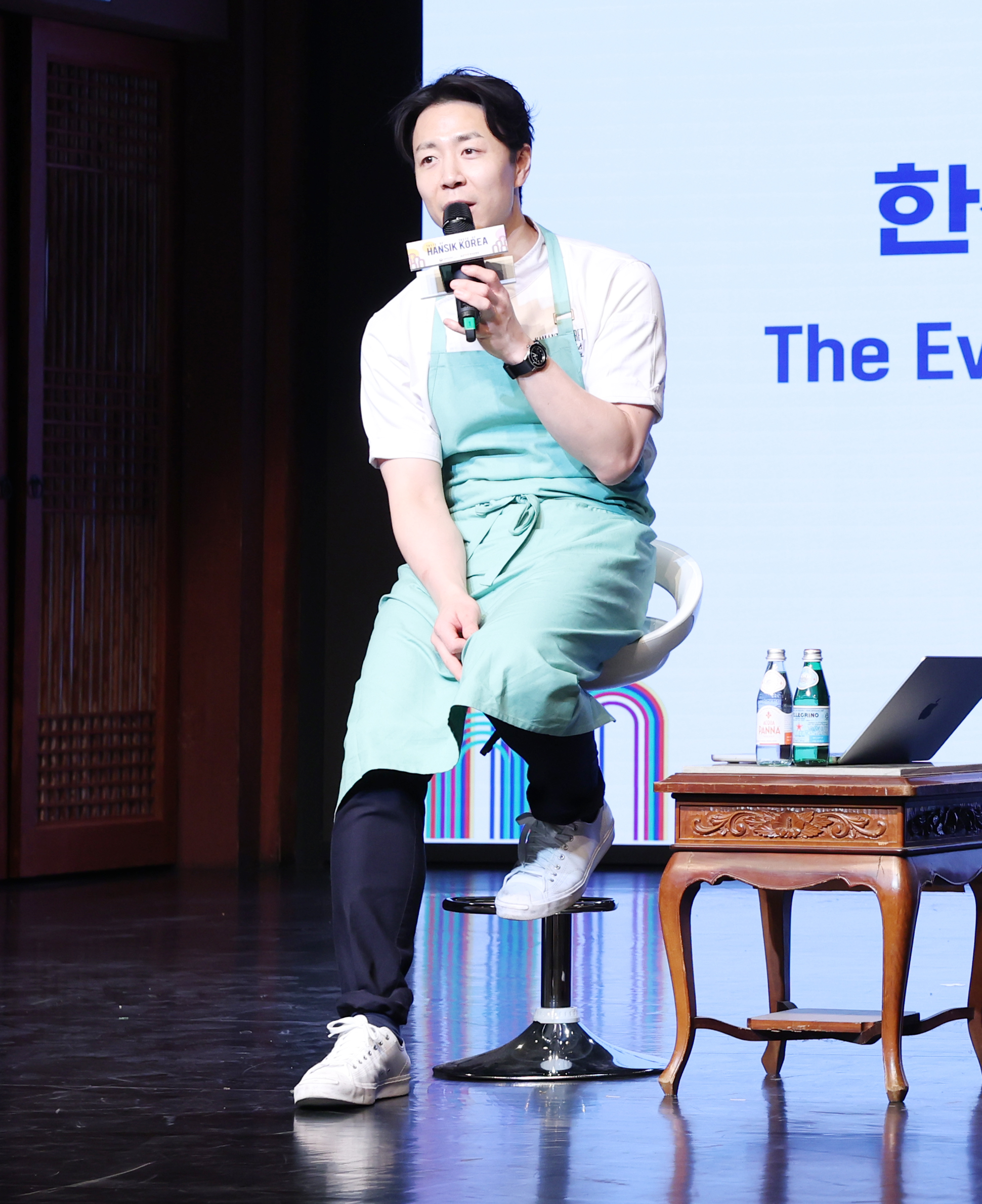
Son speaking at the "Taste of Hansik, Taste of Korea" event

Son has served as a mentor and judge in international culinary initiatives such as the S.Pellegrino Young Chef Academy Competition, where he worked with and guided younger chefs in regional finals. He has collaborated with Michelin-recognized restaurants overseas, including Seroja in Singapore and Belon in Hong Kong, hosting gala dinners featuring Korean cuisine and ingredients. Son has spoken on the importance of Korean ingredients and culinary heritage in global food trends, including at events such as, "Taste of Hansik, Taste of Korea," organized by the Korean Ministry of Agriculture, Food and Rural Affairs, and the Korean Food Promotion Institution.

Under Son's leadership, Eatanic Garden debuted on the Asia's 50 Best Restaurants list at #25 and received the Highest New Entry Award in 2025. In April 2026, Son served as the executive chef for a state dinner hosted by President Lee Jae-myung for French President Emmanuel Macron at Blue House's Sangchunjae. He presented a six-course menu blending Korean ingredients with French techniques.

== Other ventures ==
=== Endorsements ===
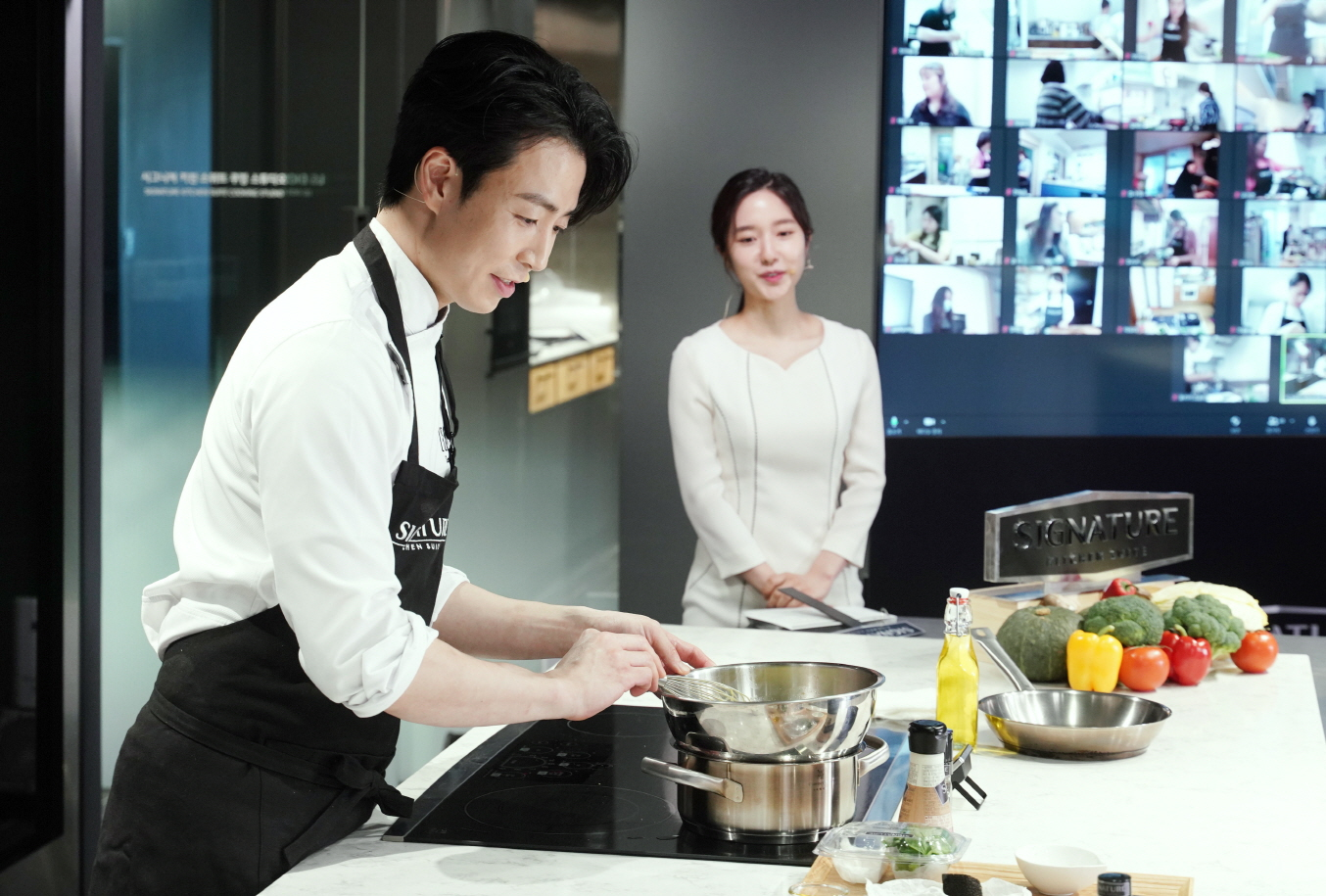
Son for LG in 2021

In 2022, Son was selected as an ambassador for the Swiss watch brand Blancpain. In 2025, he was selected as one of the ambassadors for Johnnie Walker Blue Label alongside Zo In-sung, Honey J, and Johnny. He was also selected as a model for Nespresso Professional. In September 2025, premium snack brand Vasak partnered with Son as part of its "Chef's Edition" project to create the Vasak Whole Dried Shrimp Seaweed Crisps. In November 2025, Son partnered with Emart24 to launch the 'Family Meal' line, a series of high-quality convenience store ready-meals. Due to the project's success, which contributed to a fourfold increase in the retailer's chef-collaboration sales, a second line titled 'Day Off' was released in April 2026.

In March 2026, Son was selected as the first partner of the brand partnership program "Mercedes-Benz Mate" by Mercedes-Benz Korea. He was also selected as a collaborative partner to develop a limited-edition summer menu alongside Culinary Director Jim Frisch for Shake Shack's 10th anniversary in Korea. Son announced that all personal proceeds from the partnership would be donated to charity. In April 2026, Son was selected as the brand campaign model for Yorien, a natural-filtration water purifier brand by Samik Pharmaceutical, for the launch of their premium "Chablis" product line. In August 2026, premium Korean Hanwoo beef brand Sir.loin officially signed Son as the brand model. In September 2026, Italian luxury bed and mattress brand Dorelan selected him as its official TV commercial model. In October 2026, Amorepacific's premium tea brand Osulloc launched the "Tea, The Discovery of Fine Dining" campaign. The partnership featured custom tea-infused recipes by Son.

=== Philanthropy ===
In February 2024, Son collaborated as the guest head chef for the inaugural charity dining event organized by "MINT", a volunteer initiative focused on animal welfare to fund rescue, medical treatment, and adoption programs for abandoned pets in South Korea.

In November 2025, Son participated in Compassion Korea's annual "Table for All 2025" charity dinner at Grand Walkerhill Seoul to raise funds for underprivileged children in Uganda. Later that month, he joined 15 leading fine-dining chefs at Grand Hyatt Seoul for UNICEF Korea's "Blue Star Gala", preparing a banquet to support global nutrition, healthcare, and education programs for children in need.

In October 2026, he contributed to the annual "WeAJa Sharing Market" celebrity charity auction by donating his personal chef apron and culinary gear, with all sales proceeds allocated toward housing and educational aid for children of low income families and self-reliance youth programs.

== Filmography ==
=== Television shows ===
Year	Title	Role	Notes	Ref.
2016	Cook Representative	Chef	Team USA	
2021	Veggie Earth	Chef		
2025–present	Please Take Care of My Refrigerator	Chef		
2025	Culinary Class Wars S2	White Spoon	Top 8	
