= Vinho =

Fine dining restaurant in Seoul, South Korea

- Interactive map of Vinho

Restaurant information
- Established: May 2022
- Head chef: Jeon Seong-bin (chef), Kim Jin-ho (sommelier)
- Food type: Contemporary cuisine
- Rating: (Michelin Guide)
- Location: 162 Wellstone Bldg, 38 Hakdong-ro 43-gil, Gangnam District, Seoul, 06059, South Korea
- Coordinates: 37.5184°N 127.0380°E
- Website: instagram.com/restaurant.vinho

Vinho (Korean: 빈호) is a fine dining restaurant in Seoul, South Korea. It serves contemporary cuisine, with some dishes inspired by Korean cuisine. It first opened in May 2022, and received one Michelin star for 2024.

The restaurant is led by chef Jeon Seong-bin and sommelier Kim Jin-ho (김진호). Kim won a 2024 Michelin Sommelier Award. Kim cooked and studied abroad in Melbourne, Australia for four years. After returning to South Korea, he worked at the restaurant Mingles under chef Mingoo Kang. He then went to train at the Michelin three star restauranted Geranium in Denmark. The restaurant is reportedly known for its wine selection and pairings.

== See also ==
- List of Michelin-starred restaurants in South Korea
