= L'Amant Secret =

Restaurant in Seoul, South Korea

- Interactive map of L'Amant Secret

Restaurant information
- Established: 2018
- Head chef: Son Jong-won
- Food type: Contemporary, Korean cuisine
- Rating: 1 Michelin star
- Location: 26F L'Escape Hotel, 67 Toegye-ro, Jung District, Seoul, 04529, South Korea
- Coordinates: 37.5598°N 126.9795°E
- Website: lescapehotel.com/dining/lamantsecret

L'Amant Secret (Korean: 라망 시크레) is a fine dining restaurant in Seoul, South Korea. It is located in the L'Escape Hotel and first opened in 2018. It serves contemporary cuisine, with some of the dishes taking inspiration from Korean cuisine. It received one Michelin star from 2021 through 2025. The restaurant was listed among the top 1,000 global restaurants in La Liste.

The restaurant's head chef is Son Jong-won (손종원). Son worked under chef Corey Lee of Benu, and at Quince. He also worked in Singapore's Seroja. The restaurant's interior is themed as a "Parisian escape in the Heart of Seoul". Son also runs the restaurant Eatanic Garden, which also became Michelin-starred under his tenure.

== See also ==
- List of Michelin-starred restaurants in South Korea
