= Eatanic Garden =

Fine dining restaurant in Seoul, South Korea

- Interactive map of Eatanic Garden

Restaurant information
- Owner: Josun Palace Hotel
- Head chef: Son Jong-won
- Food type: Contemporary cuisine, Korean cuisine
- Rating: (Michelin Guide)
- Location: 36F Josun Palace Hotel, 231 Teheran-ro, Gangnam District, Seoul, 06142, South Korea
- Coordinates: 37.5030°N 127.0415°E
- Website: www.eatanicgarden.com

Eatanic Garden (Korean: 이타닉가든) is a fine dining restaurant in Seoul, South Korea. The restaurant serves contemporary cuisine, with some dishes taking inspiration from Korean cuisine. It received one Michelin Star from 2023 through 2025. In 2024, it received a Michelin Service Award.

The name of the restaurant is a pun. In the Korean term for "botanic garden", 식물원; sikmulwon, sik ("living") has a homophone that means "eat". This pun has been rendered into English as "Eatanic Garden".

The restaurant's head chef Son Jong-won also runs the restaurant L'Amant Secret, also in Seoul and Michelin-starred. Son trained at The Culinary Institute of America. He worked in Noma in Denmark and Quince in San Francisco. Son received a "New Talents of the Year 2024" award from La Liste.

== See also ==
- List of Michelin-starred restaurants in South Korea
