= Joo Ok =

Korean restaurant in Manhattan, New York

- Interactive map of Joo Ok

Restaurant information
- Established: 2016
- Head chef: Shin Chang-ho
- Food type: Korean cuisine
- Rating: (2021–2023, in Seoul) (2024 in NYC,) (2025 in NYC)
- Location: 22 W 32nd St, 16th floor, New York City, NY 10001
- Coordinates: 40.7475°N 73.9869°W
- Website: www.joo-ok.com

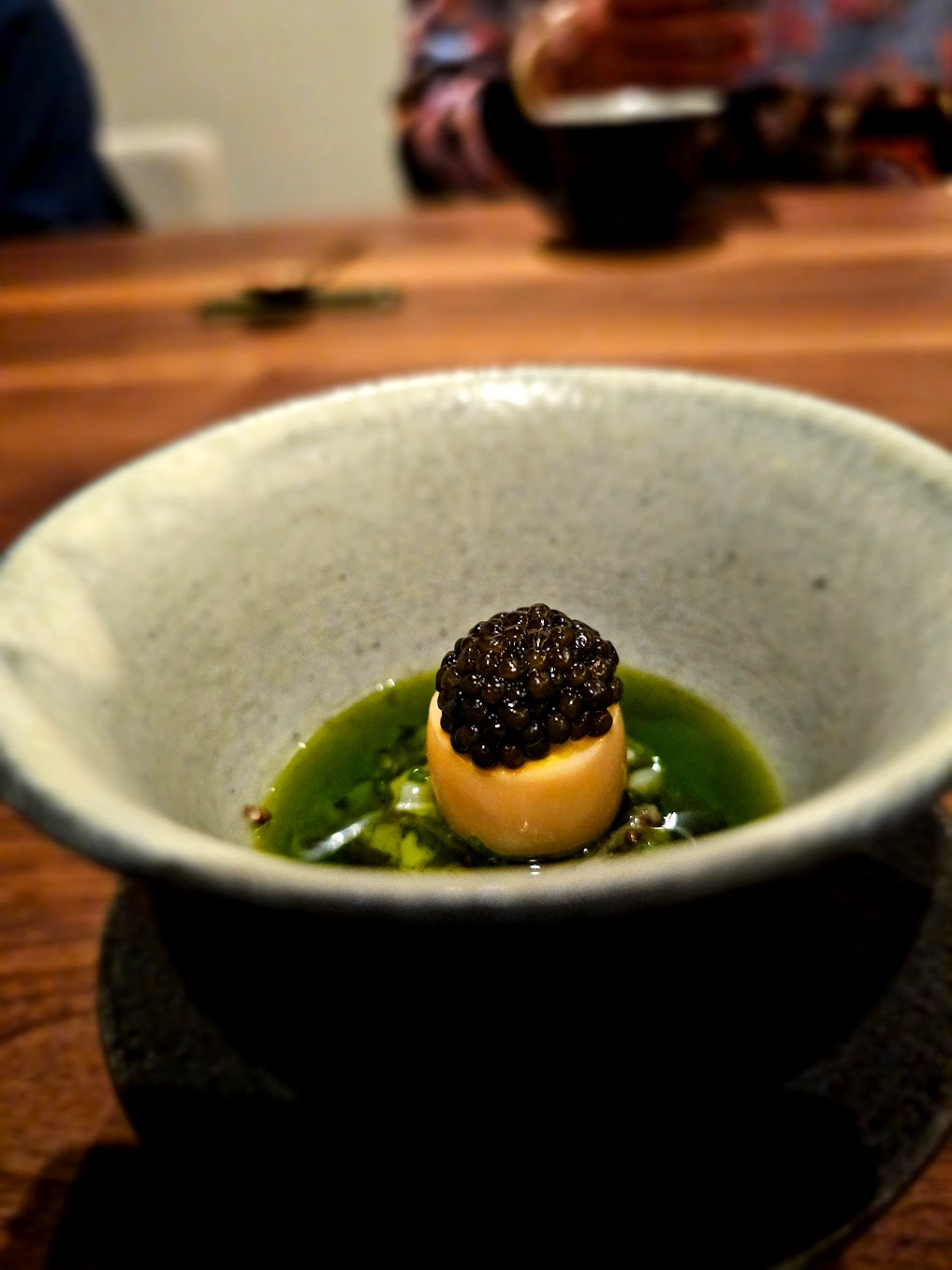
Deul Gi Reum- Spotted shrimp • Geoduck • House made perilla oil.

Joo Ok (Korean: 주옥; lit. 'precious gem'), also spelled Joo-Ok, is a Korean restaurant in Koreatown, Manhattan, New York City, United States. It first opened in 2016 in Seoul, South Korea. Its Seoul location received one Michelin star from 2018 to 2020. It received two stars from 2021 until 2023 before receiving 1 star in the 2024 Michelin NYC guide and subsequently a 2nd Michelin Star in the 2025 NYC Guide. In 2022, it was ranked 18th on the Asia's 50 Best Restaurants list. The restaurant then closed in December 2023, and announced that it would move to New York City with assistance from Hand Hospitality which also owns several other primarily Korean restaurants in New York. Around half the employees of the Seoul location went to New York City.

The restaurant is headed by Shin Chang-ho (신창호). Shin studied cooking in the United States beginning in 2013, in his mid-thirties, at the recommendation of Mingles chef Kang Min-gu. He worked at the Japanese restaurant Nobu in Miami. He reportedly decided, while at Nobu, to focus on Korean food, as his colleagues were curious about the cuisine. He began preparing for the move to New York in 2021, in part due to the economic impact of the COVID-19 pandemic in South Korea, and after observing the increasing acceptance of Korean cuisine in the city.

== See also ==
- List of Michelin-starred restaurants in New York City
- List of Michelin-starred restaurants in South Korea
