= Haobin =

Fine dining restaurant in Seoul, South Korea

- Interactive map of Haobin

Restaurant information
- Established: 2022
- Head chef: Hu Deok-juk
- Location: 2F Ambassador-Pullman Hotel, 287 Dongho-ro, Jung District, Seoul, 04618, South Korea
- Coordinates: 37.5604°N 127.0024°E
- Website: instagram.com/theambassador_haobin

Haobin (Korean: 호빈; Chinese: 豪賓; lit. 'precious guests') is a fine dining restaurant in Seoul, South Korea. It serves Chinese cuisine. It first opened in January 2022 and is located in The Ambassador Seoul Hotel. It received one Michelin star for 2024.

The restaurant's head chef is Hu Deok-juk. Hu began cooking in the 1960s. He became interested in Chinese cuisine, and began cooking at the restaurant Yonggung in the Bando Hotel in Sogong-dong. He was rejected twice from the restaurant, before being accepted on his third attempt. Hu learned from chefs from Taiwan and mainland China in South Korea and Japan. Along with the Michelin star in 2024, Hu also received a Mentor Chef Award. Hu's cooking was reportedly praised by Chinese premiere Jiang Zemin during a visit to Korea in 1994. Hu reportedly has cooked for other Chinese dignitaries who visit the country.

== See also ==
- List of Michelin-starred restaurants in South Korea
