= Alla Prima (restaurant) =

Fine dining restaurant in Seoul, South Korea

- Interactive map of Alla Prima

Restaurant information
- Established: 2015
- Rating: 2 Michelin stars
- Location: 13 Hakdong-ro 17-gil, Gangnam District, Seoul, South Korea
- Coordinates: 37.5134°N 127.0260°E
- Website: allaprima.co.kr

Alla Prima (Korean: 알라 프리마) is a fine dining restaurant in Seoul, South Korea. It was established in 2015. The restaurant was awarded one Michelin star for 2017 and 2018, and received two stars for 2019, 2020, 2021, 2022, and 2023, 2024, and 2025.

Chef Kim Jin-hyuk's (김진혁) parents worked in a bakery. After three years of work experience in Korea, he studied cooking in Japan. After he returned to Korea, he worked in several restaurants and a large food corporation, all the while preparing for opening his own restaurant. He eventually accomplished this in 2015, with a small restaurant with 16 seats. The restaurant initially reportedly struggled with its finances, and at risk of closing for an extended period of time. After hearing that the Michelin guide was soon to expand to Seoul, he prepared to capture the attention of the guide. It received its first star in 2017, the first year the guide was offered. Eventually, the restaurant moved to a larger location.

The restaurant incorporates elements of Japanese cuisine and Western cuisine. It has an open kitchen, offering views of the cooking staff at work. It offers wine pairing suggestions provided by a sommelier.

== See also ==
- List of Michelin-starred restaurants in South Korea
