= Onjium =

Fine dining restaurant in Seoul, South Korea

- Interactive map of Onjium

Restaurant information
- Established: May 2013
- Food type: Korean royal court cuisine
- Rating: 1 Michelin star
- Location: 4F, 49 Hyoja-ro, Jongno District, Seoul, 03043, South Korea
- Coordinates: 37.5804°N 126.9733°E
- Website: www.instagram.com/onjium_restaurant/

Onjium (Korean: 온지음) is a fine dining restaurant in Seoul, South Korea. It serves a modern interpretation of Korean royal court cuisine. The restaurant first opened in May 2013. It received one Michelin star from 2020 through 2024. In 2024, it was ranked No. 21 of Asia's 50 Best Restaurants. On November 19, 2021, it opened a location in New York City at Genesis House. It launched a delivery brand called Onharu in 2021.

The restaurant is led by chefs Cho Eun-hee (Korean: 조은희) and Park Sung-bae. Cho is trained in Korean royal court cuisine and Park has experience working in restaurants in Japan and the United States.

It reportedly maintains a separate site for fermenting its various ingredients in Namyangju. It also conducts internal classes on Korean history and culture for inspiration on the cooking.

== See also ==
- List of Michelin-starred restaurants in South Korea
