= Sushi Matsumoto =

Fine dining restaurant in Seoul, South Korea

Restaurant information
- Head chef: Matsumoto Mizuho
- Food type: Japanese cuisine, sushi
- Rating: 1 Michelin star
- Location: 24 Dosan-daero 75-gil, Gangnam District, Seoul, 06015, South Korea
- Coordinates: 37.5257°N 127.0456°E

Sushi Matsumoto (Korean: 스시 마츠모토) is a fine dining restaurant in Seoul, South Korea. It specializes in sushi, of Japanese cuisine. It received one Michelin Star from 2022 through 2024.

According to a 2021 article, the restaurant was led by chef Matsumoto Mizuho. Matsumoto worked at the restaurant Kyubey in Japan, as well as in the Westin Chosun Seoul's Sushi Cho. He became head chef of Sushi Matsumoto in 2011.

== See also ==
- List of Michelin-starred restaurants in South Korea
