= Kang Minchul Restaurant =

French restaurant in Seoul, South Korea

KANG MINCHUL Restaurant
- Interactive map of KANG MINCHUL Restaurant

Restaurant information
- Head chef: Kang Minchul
- Food type: French
- Location: B1F, 18 Dosan-daero 68-gil, Gangnam District, Seoul, 06064, South Korea
- Coordinates: 37.5224°N 127.0445°E
- Website: www.kangminchul.com

KANG MINCHUL Restaurant (Korean: 강민철 레스토랑) is a fine dining restaurant in Seoul, South Korea. It serves French cuisine. It received one Michelin Star from 2023 through 2025.

The owner-chef and namesake of the restaurant is Kang Minchul. Kang studied cooking in Korea until university. At age 24, he worked in hotels and restaurants in the United States. He then moved to France. He received training from French chefs such as Joël Robuchon, Alain Ducasse, and Pierre Gagnaire. A kimchi dish that he created appeared on the menu of a three-starred Pierre Gagnaire restaurant in France. He returned to South Korea in the early 2020s and started his restaurant.

The restaurant's menu is not fixed. The restaurant is also small, and serves three tables at a time by 2024; it originally served only one table at a time.

== See also ==
- List of Michelin-starred restaurants in South Korea
