= Soseoul Hannam =

Fine dining restaurant in Seoul, South Korea

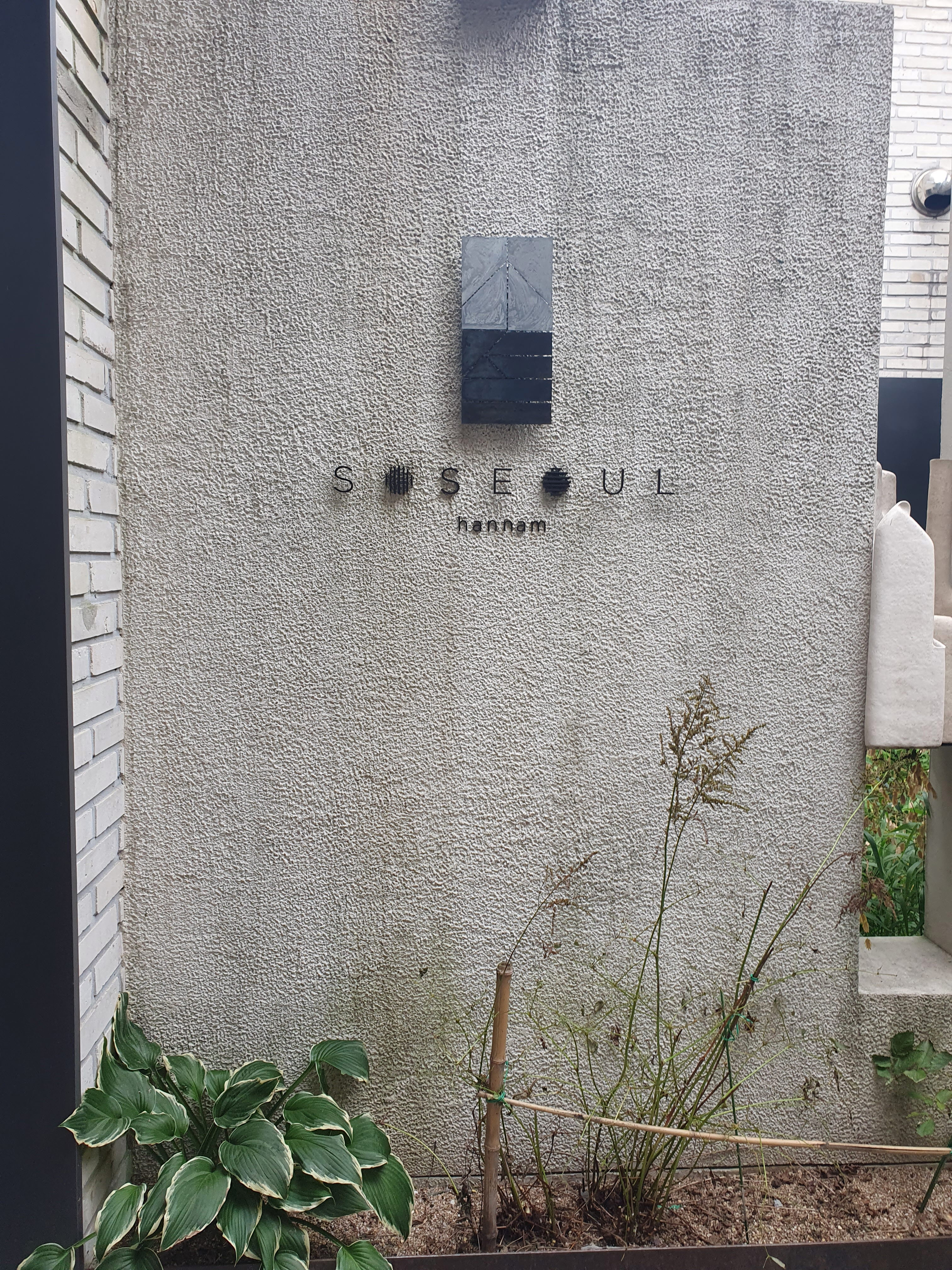

Restaurant information
- Head chef: Eom Tae-cheol
- Food type: Korean cuisine
- Rating: 1 Michelin star
- Location: B1, B-dong, 21-18 Hannamdaero 20-gil, Yongsan District, Seoul, 06073, South Korea
- Coordinates: 37.5352°N 127.0092°E
- Website: www.instagram.com/soseoul_hannam/

Soseoul Hannam (Korean: 소설한남; RR: Soseol hannam) is a fine dining restaurant in Seoul, South Korea. It serves contemporary Korean cuisine. It received one Michelin Star from 2022 through 2025.

Its head chef is Eom Tae-cheol (엄태철). Eom studied in Jeonju University, where he studied traditional Korean cuisine. He then worked abroad in the United States restaurant industry. Sharing Korean food with his coworkers and with patrons left a positive impression on him, and helped motivate his decision to cook and share Korean food. Eom's mentor is chef Roh Young-hee of Poom. Eom worked at Michelin-starred restaurants Poom and at Mosu. The name of the restaurant has several meanings; one such meaning is "story" (소설; 小說; soseol). This name was rendered in English with "Seoul" replacing "seol". The restaurant reportedly has a traditional Korean liquor pairing service.

== See also ==
- List of Michelin-starred restaurants in South Korea
