= Exquisine =

Fine dining restaurant in Seoul, South Korea

Restaurant information
- Established: November 1, 2016
- Head chef: Jang Kyung-won
- Food type: Contemporary cuisine
- Rating: 1 Michelin star
- Location: 6 Samseong-ro 140-gil, Gangnam District, Seoul, 06073, South Korea
- Coordinates: 37.5210°N 127.0496°E
- Website: www.instagram.com/exquisine_seoul/

Exquisine (Korean: 익스퀴진) is a fine dining restaurant in Seoul, South Korea. The restaurant first opened on November 1, 2016. It received one Michelin Star beginning in 2018.

Its owner-chef is Jang Kyung-won (장경원). According to a 2019 article, the restaurant has no wait staff; Jang and three other chefs reportedly cook and serve customers in a small and intimate setting. The restaurant is reportedly intentionally laid back, with customers interacting with the chefs closely.

== See also ==
- List of Michelin-starred restaurants in South Korea
