= Gaon (restaurant) =

Fine dining restaurant in Seoul, South Korea

Restaurant information
- Established: 2003
- Closed: 2023 (indefinite hiatus)
- Food type: Korean cuisine, Korean royal court cuisine
- Rating: 3 Michelin stars
- Location: 317 Dosan-daero, Sinsa-dong, Gangnam District, Seoul, South Korea
- Coordinates: 37.5226°N 127.0362°E

Gaon (Korean: 가온; lit. center), stylized as GAON, is a fine dining restaurant in Seoul, South Korea. As of 2023, it is the only South Korean restaurant to receive three Michelin stars for seven years in a row, from when the Michelin Guide Seoul first began to be published in 2016. In 2023, it went on an indefinite hiatus.

== Description ==
The restaurant first opened in 2003. It is operated by the Gaon Society, a dining subgroup of the Korean pottery brand Kwangjuyo Group (광주요그룹); the restaurant features pottery from the brand. The restaurant closed several years later, and reopened in January 2015. In late 2016, when the Michelin Guide Seoul first began to be published, the restaurant received three stars.

The restaurant's head chef is Kim Byoung-jin (김병진). Kim studied traditional Korean cuisine at Hallym Polytechnic University in his native Chuncheon, and worked as a restaurateur for nearly 20 years by 2016. Kim reportedly intentionally gives his dishes mild flavors in a manner that resembles the style of his native Gangwon Province, and attempts to rely on simple condoments such as salt, soy sauce, and doenjang. He reportedly acquires ingredients from the restaurant from a variety of places, including directly from farmers and from Garak Market and Noryangjin Market. In a 2016 interview, Kim claimed to begin each day's work around 8 a.m. in order to prepare for the restaurant's dinner service. Dinner service began at 5:30 p.m. and continued until 11 p.m.

The restaurant reportedly has the concept of "a day in the life of the king", and serves elevated Korean royal court cuisine. A meal involves a number of courses, and each are individually invented using inspirations from Korean cuisine. According to a 2016 article, there were several course menus with different options.

The restaurant temporarily closed on January 1, 2023, with the stated goal of reorganizing and researching the practices of other restaurants around the world. A number of newspapers claimed that the closure was possibly linked to a fine dining industry downturn in the aftermath of the COVID-19 pandemic.

== See also ==
- List of Michelin-starred restaurants in South Korea
