= Soigné (Seoul restaurant) =

Fine dining restaurant in Seoul, South Korea

- Interactive map of Soigné

Restaurant information
- Established: 2015
- Chef: Jun Lee
- Food type: Contemporary cuisine
- Rating: 2 Michelin stars
- Location: 201, 2F Sinsa square, 652 Gangnam-daero, Gangnam District, Seoul, 06027, South Korea
- Coordinates: 37.5193°N 127.0190°E
- Website: soignerestaurantgroup.com

Soigné (lit. 'well-groomed'; Korean: 스와니예) is a fine dining restaurant in Seoul, South Korea. It serves contemporary cuisine, and first opened in 2015. It received one Michelin star from the first year the guide was offered in Seoul in 2017 through 2022. In 2023, 2024 and 2025 it received two Michelin stars.

== Description ==
Soigné's head chef, Jun Lee, attended Kyung Hee University and The Culinary Institute of America. He worked at the Michellin-starred restaurant Per Se under chef Thomas Keller. After returning to South Korea, he started a number of pop up restaurants beginning in 2013. With the proceeds from these ventures, he eventually started Soigné in 2015.

The restaurant's menu reportedly changes every three months. It serves dishes from various traditions, including American cuisine, European cuisine, and Korean cuisine. The restaurant's signature dish is the Seorae Snail: an escargot dish that blends elements of Eastern and Western cuisine.

== See also ==
- List of Michelin-starred restaurants in South Korea
