= Soul (Seoul restaurant) =

Fine dining restaurant in Seoul, South Korea

Coordinates: 37.5453°N 126.9844°E

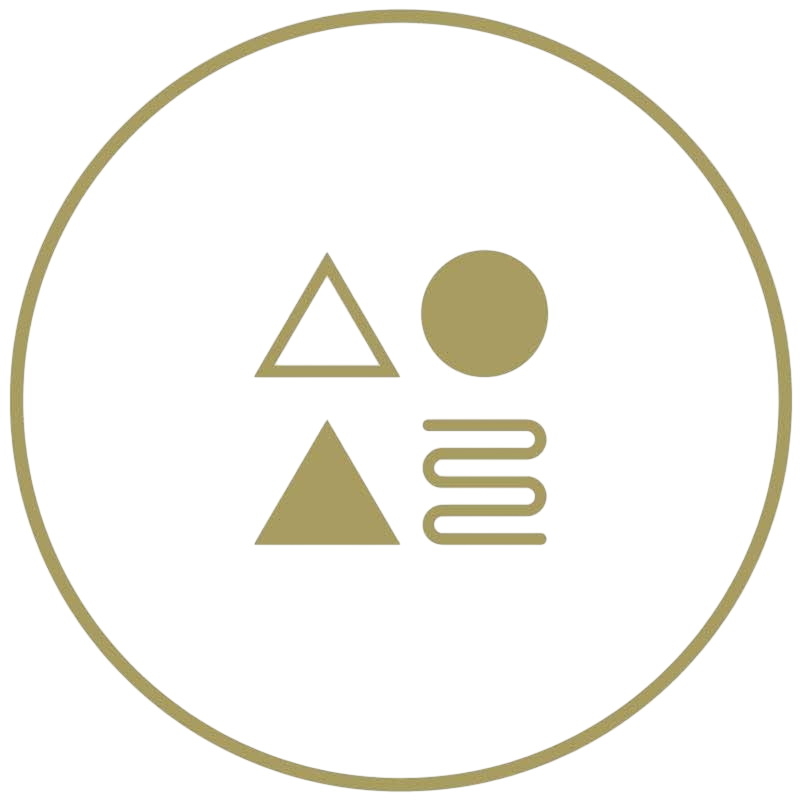
- Interactive map of Soul

Restaurant information
- Head chef: Kim Hee-eun and Yoon Dae-hyun
- Food type: Contemporary, Korean cuisine
- Rating: (Michelin Guide)
- Location: B1F, 35 Sinheung-ro 26-gil, Yongsan District, Seoul, 04337, South Korea
- Website: instagram.com/souldining_seoul

Soul (Korean: 소울) is a fine dining restaurant in Seoul, South Korea. The restaurant serves contemporary cuisine, with some dishes taking inspiration from Korean cuisine. It received one Michelin star in 2023 through 2024.

The chef-owners of the restaurant are a husband and wife duo, Kim Hee-eun (김희은) and Yoon Dae-hyun (윤대현). Kim studied Korean cuisine, and Yoon studied Western cuisine. Some of their dishes blend elements of both cuisines.

== See also ==
- List of Michelin-starred restaurants in South Korea
