= Bicena =

Fine dining restaurant in Seoul, South Korea

Restaurant information
- Established: 2012
- Food type: Contemporary Korean cuisine
- Rating: 1 Michelin star
- Location: 81st floor, 300 Olympic-ro, Sincheon-dong, Songpa District, Seoul, South Korea
- Coordinates: 37.5126°N 127.1025°E
- Website: www.bicena.com/en (in English, Korean)

Bicena (Korean: 비채나; lit. empty, fill, share) is a fine dining restaurant in Seoul, South Korea. It serves contemporary Korean cuisine. The restaurant first opened in 2012 in Hannam-dong. In 2017, it moved to the 81st floor of Lotte World Tower. It received one Michelin star from the first time the guide was issued in 2017 through 2025.

A 2024 article claimed that Bicena is the highest Korean restaurant in the world. It is led by Chef Kwangsik Jun (전광식). It is managed by the Gaon Society (가온소사이어티), a division of the KwangJuYo Group (광주요그룹).

== See also ==
- List of Michelin-starred restaurants in South Korea
