= Yun (restaurant) =

Fine dining restaurant in Seoul, South Korea

Restaurant information
- Head chef: Kim Do-yun
- Food type: Korean cuisine
- Rating: 1 Michelin star
- Location: 805 Seolleung-ro, Gangnam District, Seoul, 06019, South Korea
- Coordinates: 37.5236°N 127.0389°E
- Website: www.instagram.com/yunseoul.restaurant/

Yun (Korean: 윤) is a fine dining restaurant in Seoul, South Korea. It serves Korean cuisine. It earned one Michelin Star from 2022 through 2024.

The restaurant is led by chef Kim Do-yun. Kim never attended a culinary school, and instead learned by working in various restaurants in Korea since 1992. It serves a variety of Korean noodle dishes, as well as fish and beef dishes. The restaurant was closed for eight months, from late 2021 to March 2022. During this time, Kim visited Europe and the United States to study food there.

== See also ==
- List of Michelin-starred restaurants in South Korea
