= Solbam =

Fine dining restaurant in Seoul, South Korea

Restaurant information
- Established: 2021
- Head chef: Eom Taejun
- Food type: Contemporary cuisine, contemporary Korean cuisine
- Rating: (Michelin Guide)
- Location: 2F, 231 Hakdong-ro, Gangnam District, Seoul, 06053, South Korea
- Coordinates: 37.5154°N 127.0341°E
- Website: www.restaurantsolbam.com

Solbam (Korean: 솔밤), stylized as SOLBAM, is a fine dining restaurant in Seoul, South Korea. It first opened in 2021, and serves contemporary Korean cuisine. It received one Michelin Star from 2023 through 2025. The Korea Herald rated it the best restaurant in Seoul in 2022. The restaurant first opened in Gangnam District. It relocated to a different space and reopened on February 17, 2024.

The restaurant's owner-chef is Eom Taejun (엄태준). Eom graduated from a culinary school in South Korea, then attended The Culinary Institute of America beginning in 2013. He worked at the restaurant Eleven Madison Park. After he returned to Korea, he founded Solbam. The restaurant earned a Michelin Star just a year after its opening.

The restaurant is named for an area in Andong in North Gyeongsang Province. The restaurant is reportedly themed after a quiet forest in the area at nighttime. By 2024, it only operated a dinner service; each dinner reportedly lasts around 3 to 4 hours.

== See also ==
- List of Michelin-starred restaurants in South Korea
