= 7th Door =

Fine dining restaurant in Seoul, South Korea

- Interactive map of 7th Door

Restaurant information
- Established: 2013
- Owner: Kim Dae-chun
- Food type: Contemporary, Korean cuisine
- Rating: 1 Michelin star
- Location: 4F, 41 Hakdong-ro 97-gil, Gangnam District, Seoul, 06072, South Korea
- Coordinates: 37.5223°N 127.0543°E
- Website: www.7thdoor.kr

7th Door is a restaurant in Seoul, South Korea. It first opened in 2013, and received one Michelin star from 2021 through 2025. It was ranked 18th of Asia's 50 Best Restaurants in 2024. It serves contemporary dishes that often take inspiration from Korean cuisine.

The restaurant's chef-owner is Kim Dae-chun. Kim previously operated the restaurant Toc Toc, which is in the same building. 7th Door creates 40 different ingredients and sauces from scratch. Such ingredients includes jang (fermented sauces), aekjeot (fish sauces), cheong (syrups), and pickled foods. The restaurant has a passageway with seven symbolic doors. The first five symbolize the flavors of sweet, sour, salty, spicy, and bitter. The sixth door is fermentation or aging, and the seventh is a new experience of flavor. The restaurant is small and intimate, with a clear view of the kitchen.

== See also ==
- List of Michelin-starred restaurants in South Korea
