= Hu Deok-juk =

South Korean chef

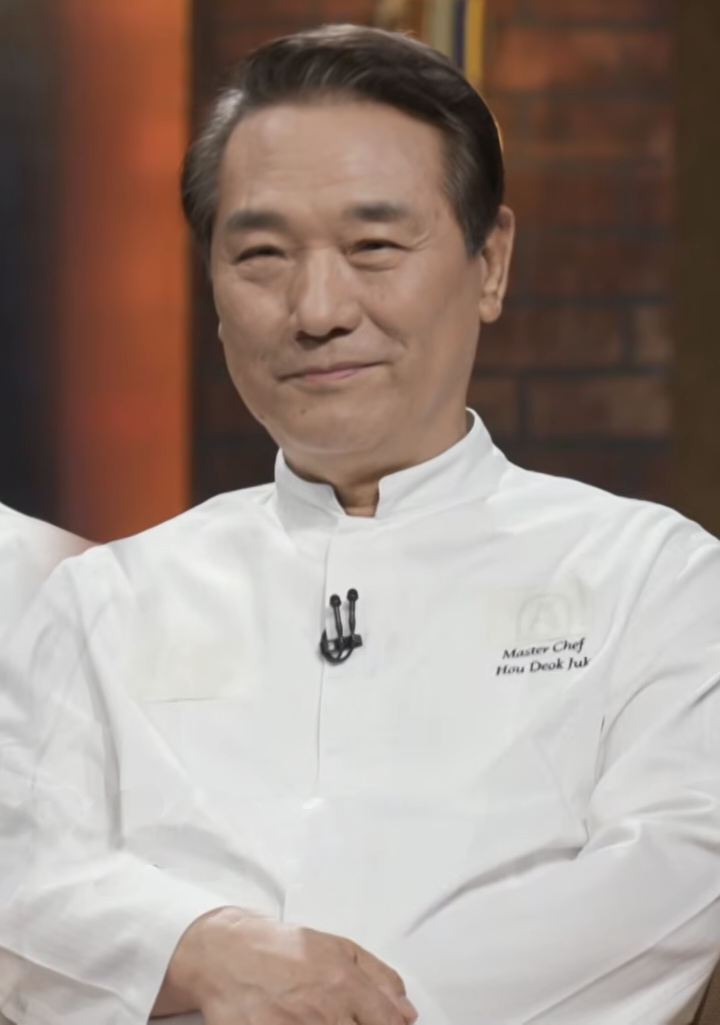
- Hu in March 2026
- Born: 1949 (age 76–77); Seoul, South Korea
- Culinary career
- Cooking style: Chinese cuisine
- Current restaurant: Haobin

Korean name
- Hangul: 후덕죽
- Hanja: 侯德竹
- RR: Hu Deokjuk
- MR: Hu Tŏkchuk

Hu Deok-juk (Korean: 후덕죽) is a South Korean chef. He is a chef of Haobin, a fine dining Chinese restaurant at the Ambassador-Pullman Hotel in Jung District, Seoul, South Korea. Haobin earned a Michelin star in 2024.

== Early life ==
Hu was born in 1949 in Sogong-dong, Seoul, and he grew up in a Chinese-Korean household.

== Culinary career ==
In 1977, Hu joined The Shilla Seoul’s Chinese restaurant, Palsun. There, Hu introduced Buddha Jumps Over the Wall to the Korean culinary world in 1987, which played a significant role in shifting the dominant style of Chinese cuisine consumed in South Korea from Sichuan cuisine to Cantonese cuisine.

In 2024, Hu received a Mentor Chef Award from the Michelin Guide.
