= Evett (restaurant) =

Fine dining restaurant in Seoul, South Korea

- Interactive map of Evett

Restaurant information
- Established: 2019
- Manager: Ginny Kim
- Head chef: Joseph Lidgerwood
- Food type: Innovative, Korean cuisine
- Rating: 2 Michelin stars
- Location: 10-5 Dosan-daero 45-gil, Gangnam District, Seoul, 06021, South Korea
- Coordinates: 37.5233°N 127.0362°E
- Website: www.restaurantevett.com

Evett (Korean: 에빗) is a fine dining restaurant in Seoul, South Korea. It first opened in 2019, and received one Michelin star from 2020 through 2024 and two Michelin stars in 2025. Restaurant Evett was named the winner of the "Best Champagne & Sparkling Wine List for Asia" and "Best Long Wine List for Asia" categories at The World of Fine Wine – Best Wine List Awards 2025. The restaurant incorporates elements of Korean and other cuisines.

Its owner-chef is Joseph Lidgerwood, an Australian from Tasmania. He has experience cooking in the United Kingdom, the United States, and in Scandinavia. In 2016, he first arrived in South Korea and opened a pop-up restaurant. Lidgerwood spent time learning to cook Korean cuisine, especially in creating jang (fermented bean foods). He studied under Kisoondo, a jang artisan. As of 2026 it is operated by a company headed by Lidgerwood's wife, Ginny Kim.

A liquor brewed by Lidgerwood called "Oh My Gat" is served in the restaurant. The menu changes seasonally. In September 2026, the operating company and Kim as its chief executive were fined after a court hearing for serving a dessert topped with ants, which are not a permitted ingredient in South Korea.

== See also ==
- List of Michelin-starred restaurants in South Korea
