= Muoki =

Restaurant in Seoul, South Korea

- Interactive map of Muoki

Restaurant information
- Head chef: James Park
- Food type: Contemporary cuisine
- Rating: 1 Michelin star
- Location: 2F, 12-12 Hakdong-ro 55-gil, Gangnam District, Seoul, 06065, South Korea
- Coordinates: 37.5189°N 127.0422°E
- Website: www.muoki.net

Muoki (Korean: 무오키) is a fine dining restaurant in Seoul, South Korea. It received its first Michelin star in 2019 and it maintained the one-star distinction in 2025. Its name means "oak tree" in Afrikaans.

Its executive chef is James Park (박무현; Bak Muhyeon). Park worked in a number of international restaurants, including in the Hilton Hotel in Washington, D.C., in The Fat Duck in London, and in Quay in Sydney. Park previously worked in The Test Kitchen in Cape Town, South Africa for five years. Over time, he reportedly became no. 2 in the kitchen. He also worked in a French restaurant and led a food lab in a restaurant on Jeju Island in South Korea. He returned to Seoul in 2017, and opened Muoki. The restaurant reportedly explores creating dishes using ingredients in multiple different ways.

The restaurant was reviewed positively by Lee Geon-gu (이건구) of The Sommelier Times in 2022.

== See also ==
- List of Michelin-starred restaurants in South Korea
