= Kwonsooksoo =

Fine dining restaurant in Seoul, South Korea

Restaurant information
- Established: 2015
- Owner: Kwon Woo-joong
- Rating: 2 Michelin stars
- Location: 37 Apgujeong-ro 80-gil, Gangnam District, Seoul, South Korea
- Coordinates: 37.5243°N 127.0435°E
- Website: www.kwonsooksoo.com/EN/ (in English)

Kwonsooksoo (Korean: 권숙수) is a fine dining Korean restaurant in Seoul, South Korea. The restaurant opened in July 2015, and received two Michelin stars in the 2017 Michelin guide. It has maintained that rating through 2025.

The head chef is Kwon Woo-joong (권우중). Kwon reportedly learned cooking from his mother. His family reportedly cooked extensively at home; they reportedly made 20 types of kimchi at once. The restaurant's cuisine takes inspiration from Korean royal court cuisine. Dishes are served in Korean ceramics.

== See also ==
- List of Michelin-starred restaurants in South Korea
