= Mitou =

Fine dining restaurant in Seoul, South Korea

- Interactive map of Mitou

Restaurant information
- Established: 2018
- Food type: Japanese cuisine
- Rating: 2 Michelin stars 1 Michelin green star
- Location: 24 Dosan-daero 70-gil, Gangnam District, Seoul, 06064, South Korea
- Coordinates: 37.5221°N 127.0450°E

Mitou (Korean: 미토우; Japanese: 未到, lit. 'yet to arrive') is a fine dining restaurant in Seoul, South Korea. It first opened in 2018, and serves Japanese cuisine. It received one Michelin star from 2021 to 2023, and received two stars in 2024.

The restaurant serves kaiseki (multi-course) meals. The menu changes every season and year, following the availability of ingredients. The cuisine serves both traditional Japanese cuisine and innovations on the cuisine. The pair adjust the menu to suit Korean tastes. Their signature dish is a savory monaka (Japanese confection). The restaurant is led by chef duo Kwon Young-woon and Kim Bo-mi; the pair met while training in Japan. The restaurant is named for the restaurant's aspiration to a consistent work ethic and perfection.

== See also ==
- List of Michelin-starred restaurants in South Korea
