= L'Amitié (restaurant) =

French restaurant in Seoul, South Korea

- Interactive map of L'Amitié

Restaurant information
- Established: 1999
- Head chef: Jang Myoung-sik
- Food type: French cuisine
- Rating: 1 Michelin star
- Location: 2F, 30 Dosan-daero 67-gil, Gangnam District, Seoul, 06015, South Korea
- Coordinates: 37.5259°N 127.0445°E

L'Amitié (lit. 'friendship'; Korean: 라미띠에) is a fine dining restaurant in Seoul, South Korea. It specializes in French cuisine and first opened in 1999. It received one Michelin star for 2018 (the first year the guide was offered in Seoul) through 2025.

== Description ==
The restaurant first opened in 1999. A 2001 article reported that its owner was named Seo Seung-ho (서승호). In 2006, Jang Myoung-sik became the head chef and owner. Jang reportedly left a stable job and took up debt in order to acquire the restaurant.

A 2014 article reported that the restaurant operated out of a very small facility with just two tables on a 100% reservation basis (the restaurant is in a different location as of 2024). The owner reportedly claimed that in a Michelin Guide representative once ate at the restaurant before the guide was ever offered in Seoul; the representative reportedly claimed the restaurant was worthy of being included in the guide.

== See also ==
- List of Michelin-starred restaurants in South Korea
