= Goryori Ken =

Fine dining restaurant in Seoul, South Korea

- Interactive map of Goryori Ken

Restaurant information
- Established: 2016
- Head chef: Kim Geon
- Food type: Japanese cuisine
- Rating: 1 Michelin star
- Location: 2F, 15-3 Eonju-ro 152-gil, Gangnam District, Seoul, 06021, South Korea
- Coordinates: 37.5229°N 127.0348°E

Goryori Ken (Korean: 고료리 켄; Japanese: 小料理 健, lit. 'small food Geon') is a fine dining restaurant in Seoul, South Korea. It serves contemporary Japanese cuisine. It opened in 2016 and has been awarded one Michelin Star from 2022 through 2025.

Its chef-owner is Kim Geon (김건), whom the restaurant is named for. Kim is reportedly reputed for having brought Japanese izakaya culture to Seoul. The restaurant reportedly orients the dining experience around the drinks chosen, rather than around the food. The restaurant was reportedly closed for some time, and reopened in 2019.

== See also ==
- List of Michelin-starred restaurants in South Korea
