= Kojacha =

Fine dining restaurant in Seoul, South Korea

- Interactive map of Kojacha

Restaurant information
- Established: May 2020
- Chef: Choi Yu-gang, Hwang Jun-seong
- Food type: Chinese, Japanese
- Location: 17 Hakdong-ro 97-gil, Gangnam District, Seoul, 06072, South Korea
- Coordinates: 37.5208°N 127.0552°E
- Website: www.instagram.com/kojacha.official/

Kojacha (Korean: 코자차) is a fine dining restaurant in Seoul, South Korea. It first opened in May 2020, and received one Michelin star from 2022 through 2024. The restaurant serves dishes from Japanese and Chinese cuisine. Its name takes one syllable each from "Korean", "Japanese", and "Chinese", and means "Koreans serving Japanese and Chinese food".

== Description ==
The restaurant is operated by chefs Choi Yu-gang (최유강) and Hwang Jun-seong (황준성). Choi began working in the dining industry as a dishwasher. When a chef left his restaurant, he began cooking. After switching restaurants, he studied and gained entry to a prestigious culinary school in South Korea, part of Kyung Hee University. Afterwards, he began working at the Hotel Shilla. There, he worked on his Chinese culinary skills and rose up the ranks. He reportedly learned the Chinese language, and ended up serving food to the South Korean presidential residence the Blue House and for General Secretary of the Chinese Communist Party Xi Jinping. He eventually became inspired to create Kojacha after visiting the Chinese restaurant in Japan Sazenka, which combined Chinese and Japanese flavors.

The restaurant began as a one-table restaurant, in what was once a former parking lot, in Yangjae-dong in May 2020. Reservations were reportedly booked months in advance for the experience. It moved to a full restaurant space in Cheongdam-dong in 2021.

The restaurant's concept is reportedly elevating existing cuisine, rather than inventing new dishes. It serves dishes from both authentic Chinese cuisine, as well as Korean Chinese dishes like tangsuyuk.

== See also ==
- List of Michelin-starred restaurants in South Korea
