= La Yeon =

Fine dining restaurant in Seoul, South Korea

- Interactive map of La Yeon

Restaurant information
- Established: August 2013
- Food type: Korean cuisine
- Rating: 2 Michelin stars
- Location: 249 Dongho-ro, Jangchung-dong, Jung District, Seoul, South Korea
- Coordinates: 37.5557°N 127.0053°E
- Website: Homepage (in English)

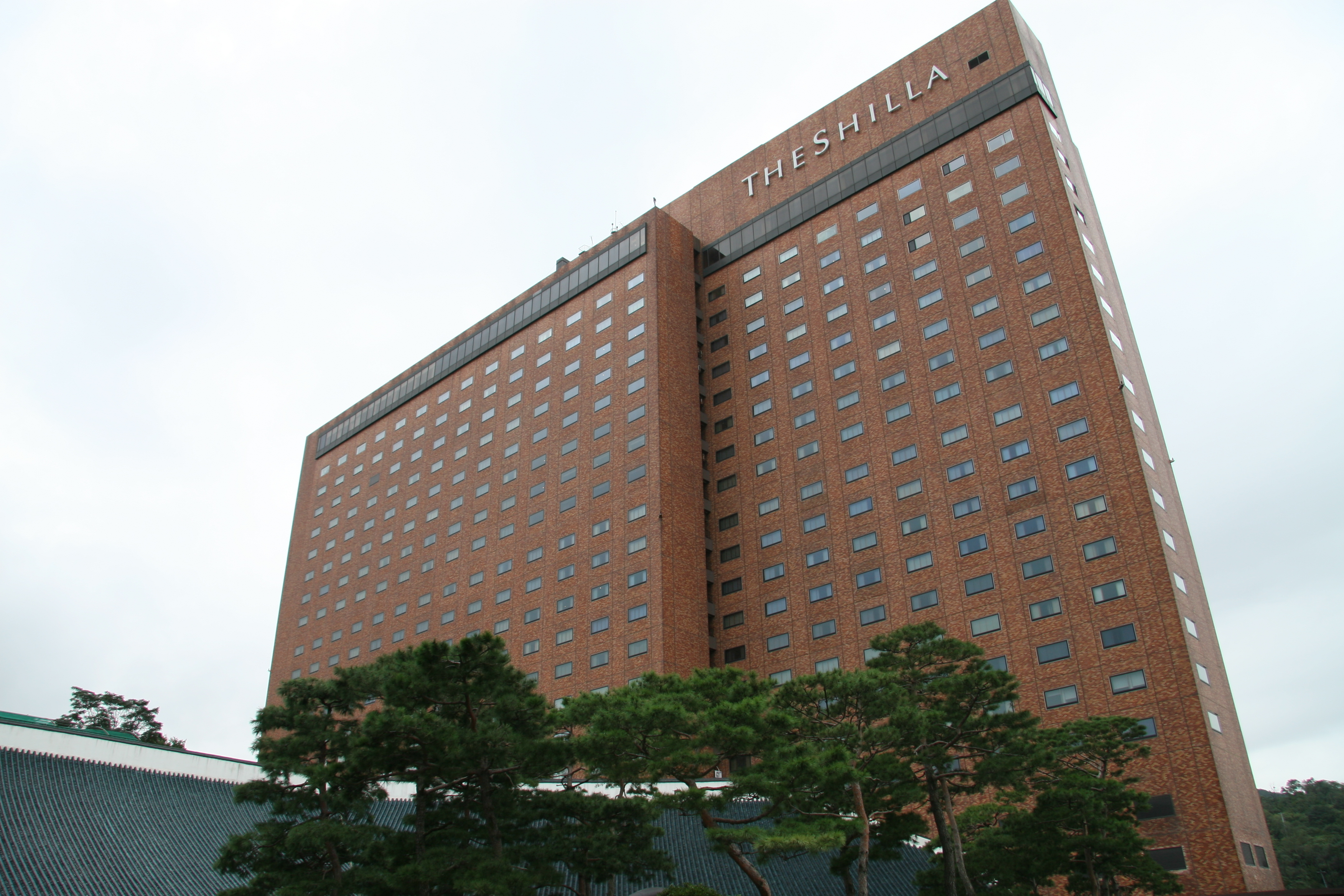
The Shilla Seoul, the building which contains La Yeon

La Yeon (Korean: 라연) is a fine dining restaurant in Seoul, South Korea. It is located on the 23rd floor of the hotel The Shilla Seoul. It received two Michelin stars in 2023. It was rated one of the top 200 global restaurants for the 2024 La Liste, and has remained in the top 500 restaurants since joining the list in 2017.

== Description ==
The restaurant first opened in August 2013. By 2019, its head chef was Kim Sung Il. Kim began working in The Shilla Seoul in 1988, the year of the 1988 Summer Olympics in Seoul, and eventually became head chef of its restaurant.

The restaurant reportedly changes its menu every season, and takes inspiration from traditional Korean cooking manuscripts. The cooking team reportedly holds twice-monthly workshops, where the team is asked to research various themes of traditional Korean cuisine for new ideas. People then present what they learned, and demonstrate samples of new dishes. This process reportedly often results in new additions to the menu.

The restaurant reportedly has a large wine collection, with wine pairing reportedly being a popular activity for diners. As Korean cuisine is often acidic or sweet, the in-house sommelier recommends various wines to suit the flavor profile of the meal.

== See also ==
- List of Michelin-starred restaurants in South Korea
