= Hane (restaurant) =

Fine dining restaurant in Seoul, South Korea

Restaurant information
- Head chef: Choi Ju-yong
- Food type: Sushi
- Rating: (Michelin Guide)
- Location: 14 Eonju-ro 172-gil, Gangnam District, Seoul, 06017, South Korea
- Coordinates: 37.5275°N 127.0348°E

Hane (Korean: 하네; Japanese: 羽, lit. 'wing'), stylized as HANE, is a fine dining restaurant in Seoul, South Korea. It specializes in sushi. It received one Michelin Star from 2022 through 2024.

The restaurant's head chef is Choi Ju-yong (최주용). The restaurant's signature dish, as of 2022, was its kohada sushi.

== See also ==
- List of Michelin-starred restaurants in South Korea
