= Muni (restaurant) =

Fine dining restaurant in Seoul, South Korea

Restaurant information
- Established: 2018
- Owner: Kim Dong-wook
- Food type: Japanese cuisine, kaiseki
- Rating: 1 Michelin star
- Location: 16 Dosan-daero 72-gil, Gangnam District, Seoul, 06063, South Korea
- Coordinates: 37.5229°N 127.0454°E
- Website: www.instagram.com/washoku_muni/

Muni (Korean: 무니; Japanese: 無二, lit. 'no two alike') is a fine dining restaurant in Seoul, South Korea. It specializes in Japanese cuisine, specifically kaiseki (multi-course meals). It first opened in 2018. It received one Michelin Star from 2021 through 2024.

Its head chef is Kim Dong-wook. Kim fell in love with Japanese cuisine in high school, after reading the Japanese manga Shōta no Sushi. He graduated from the Hattori Nutrition College. He began working in the kaiseki restaurant Kikunoi, under owner-chef Yoshihiro Murata. He also studied to become a sake sommelier: a kikizakeshi.

According to a 2021 article, the restaurant reportedly attempts to emphasize seasonality of ingredients. The menu reportedly changes every month, and there is no fixed signature dish. The restaurant serves an array of dishes from Japanese cuisine.

== See also ==
- List of Michelin-starred restaurants in South Korea
