= Mori (Busan restaurant) =

Japanese restaurant in Busan, South Korea

Restaurant information
- Food type: Japanese cuisine
- Rating: 1 Michelin star
- Location: 2-4, 2F, 24 Haeundaehaebyeon-ro 298 beon-gil, Haeundae District, Busan, 48099, South Korea
- Coordinates: 35.1601°N 129.1665°E

Mori (Korean: 모리; Japanese: 森, lit. 'forest') is a fine dining restaurant in Haeundae District, Busan, South Korea. It serves Japanese cuisine, specifically kaiseki (multi-course meal). It received its first Michelin star in 2024.

Chef Kim Wan-kyu worked as a cook in Korea, until he decided at age 29 to move to Japan to train. He studied at Tokyo Sushi and Cuisine School. At age 35, he returned to Korea and opened Mori, along with his Japanese wife. The restaurant is reportedly named for Kim's wife. The menu is reportedly designed to incorporate seafood, which Busan is known for, as well as to account for Busan's seasons. There is reportedly no set menu; meals are reportedly unique in each experience.

== See also ==
- List of Michelin-starred restaurants in South Korea
