= Fiotto =

Restaurant in Busan, South Korea

- Interactive map of Fiotto

Restaurant information
- Food type: Italian cuisine, farm-to-table
- Rating: 1 Michelin star 1 Michelin green star
- Location: 4F, Jwadongsunhwan-ro 432, Haeunedae District, Busan, South Korea
- Coordinates: 35.1618°N 129.1735°E

Fiotto (Korean: 피오또) is a fine dining restaurant in Busan, South Korea. The restaurant serves Italian cuisine and has a farm-to-table concept. In 2024, it received a Michelin Star and South Korea's only Michelin Green Star.

Over 80% of the restaurant's produce comes from the family farm of chef Lee Dong-ho (이동호). Lee and his wife chef Kim Ji-hye (김지혜) visit the farm twice a week, to participate in farm work and gather ingredients. They cultivate around 30 to 40 varieties of crops. The restaurant is reportedly intimate, with a single long table and an open kitchen. Meals are reportedly accompanied by descriptions of the ingredients, and photos and videos of the farm. The pasta is reportedly handmade, and local pork and fish are used in the dishes. It reportedly offers a kombucha pairing experience.

== See also ==
- List of Michelin-starred restaurants in South Korea
