= Zero Complex =

Fine dining restaurant in Seoul, South Korea

- Interactive map of Zero Complex

Restaurant information
- Established: July 2014
- Chef: Lee Choong Hu
- Food type: Contemporary cuisine
- Rating: 1 Michelin star
- Location: 11-8 Seobinggo-ro 59-gil, Yongsan District, Seoul, 04384, South Korea
- Coordinates: 37.5207°N 126.9928°E
- Website: www.instagram.com/zerocomplex_seoul/

Zero Complex (Korean: 제로 컴플렉스), stylized as ZERO COMPLEX, is a fine dining restaurant in Seoul, South Korea.

Chef-owner Lee Choong Hu (이충후) studied at Le Cordon Bleu in Paris, France. He apprenticed at the restaurant Le Chateaubriand, which was run by Iñaki Aizpitarte. He returned to Korea in 2013, and opened Zero Complex in July 2014 in the Seorae Village area of Seoul. It opened to mixed reviews; visitors were reportedly taken aback by its stainless steel decor and "esoteric" approach to French cuisine. He reportedly designed the menu to appeal to the South Korean palate, while still being distinctly French. In 2017, the first time the Michelin Guide was offered in South Korea, he became South Korea's youngest chef to receive a Michelin star, and he continued to hold the one-star status in 2025. A 2018 article reported that the restaurant also operated a bar called Bar Piknic.

== See also ==
- List of Michelin-starred restaurants in South Korea
