= Kojima (restaurant) =

Sushi restaurant in Seoul, South Korea

- Interactive map of Kojima

Restaurant information
- Established: 2014
- Food type: Sushi
- Location: 6F Boon the Shop, 21 Apgujeong-ro 60-gil, Gangnam District, Seoul, 06016, South Korea
- Coordinates: 37°31′32″N 127°02′31″E

Kojima (Korean: 코지마; Japanese: 小島, lit. 'small island') is a sushi restaurant in Seoul, South Korea. From 2018 through 2025, they maintained their two Michelin stars. The restaurant first opened in 2014.

The head chef is Park Kyung-jae. Park was born on the small island Uido (the restaurant's name refers to his home island). His father was a fisherman, and he grew up eating much fresh seafood. He moved to Seoul in 1989, just after graduating from high school without knowing what career path he would take. By chance, his friend worked in a Japanese restaurant, so he joined his friend. From then on, he worked in the industry. He worked in Ariake in the Josun Hotel and Sushi Chohee at Hotel Shilla.

Sushi chefs serve sushi to guests directly on the surface of the bar; the bar is constructed from 500-year-old hinoki wood from Japan. Park reportedly sources the fish from Garak Market every day. The restaurant is owned by a proprietor, Won Jin (원진).

== See also ==
- List of Michelin-starred restaurants in South Korea
