= Kojima Peninsula =

Peninsula on the island of Honshū in Japan

- Peninsula
- Interactive map of Kojima Peninsula
- Coordinates: 34°30′N 133°52′E
- Location: Okayama Prefecture
- Highest elevation: 403

The Kojima Peninsula (Japanese: 児島半島, Hepburn: Kojima Hantō) is a peninsula in the Western part of the island of Honshū in Japan and is located in the Okayama Prefecture.

The landscape is mountainous, the highest point is Kinko Mountain (403 m).

Since 1988 the peninsula is connected with Sakaide city on Shikoku by the Great Seto Bridge.
