= Kojima Gyokuhō =

Japanese artist

Kojima Gyokuhō (児嶋 玉鳳, 1907–1934) was a Japanese artist. Little is known about him, except that he worked with the Kyoto City publisher Happōdō. He rejected the Western concept that art was an expression of the artist's individuality. Rather, he embraced the traditional method of producing woodblock prints through the cooperation of a designer (artist), a woodblock carver, a printer, and a publisher. He also favored traditional Japanese subjects, such as Japanese textiles, kabuki, and ukiyo-e masterpieces.

== Prints ==
Kojima is best known for his series One Hundred Poetry Illustrations. It consists of 50 woodblock prints. Each print is about a traditional Japanese poem. The series were published by Kondo Happodo in Kyoto in 1932. For the prints he used metallic pigments, gofun, and embossing.

== Gallery ==
One Hundred Poetry Illustrations: A Collection of Multicolor Woodblock Prints by Kojima Gyokuhō, c.1934

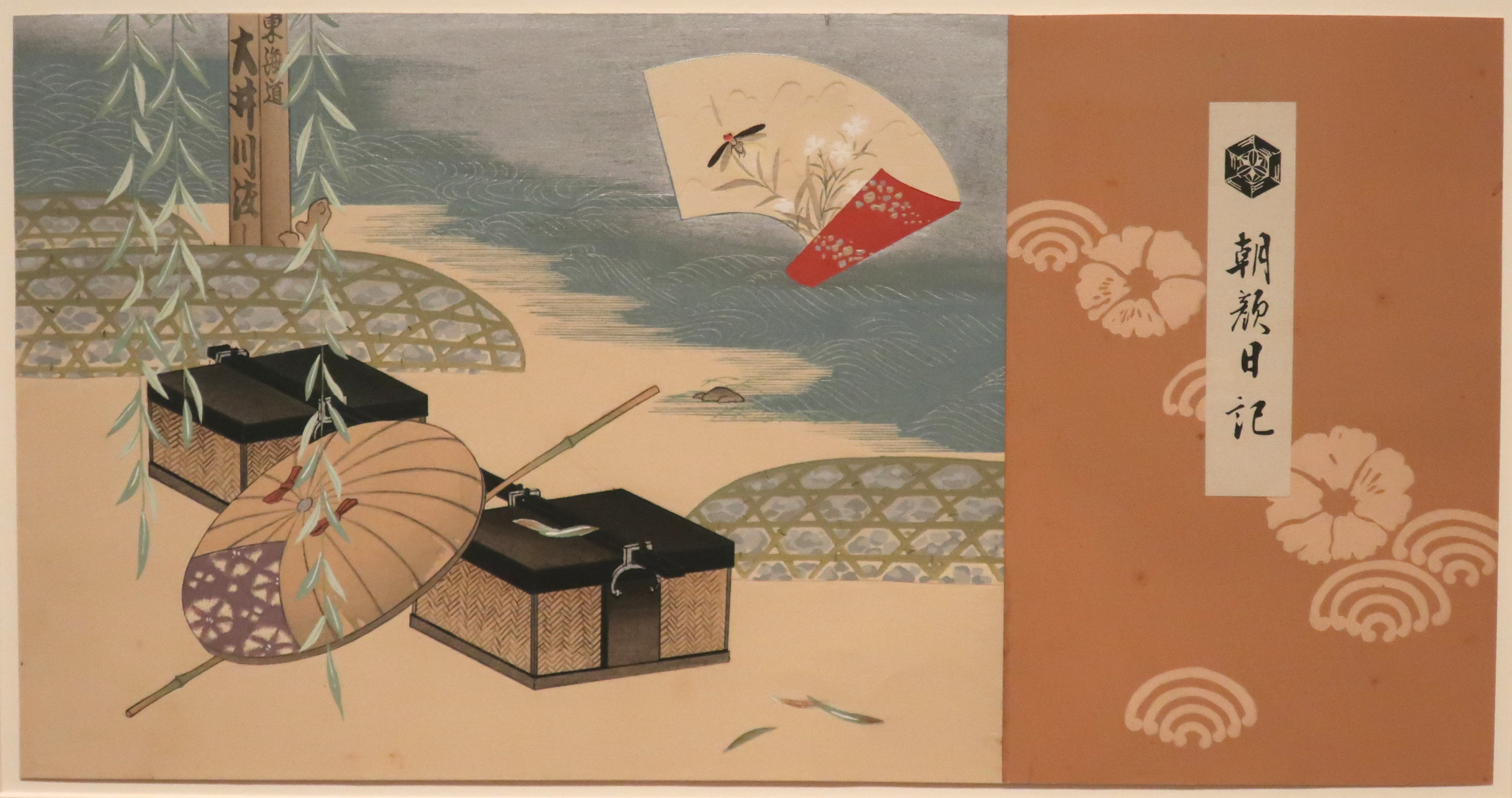
Asagao Nikki

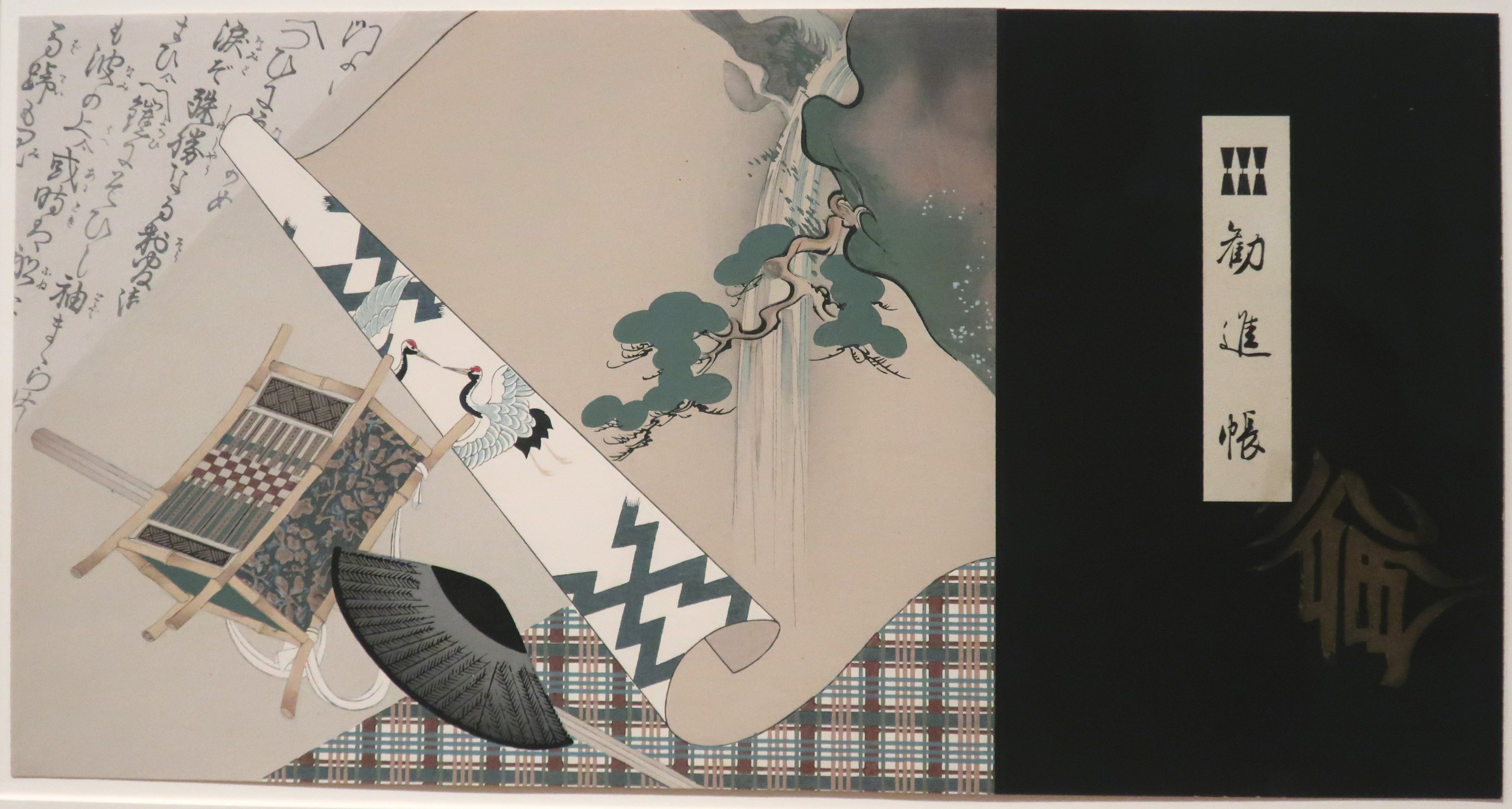
Kanjincho

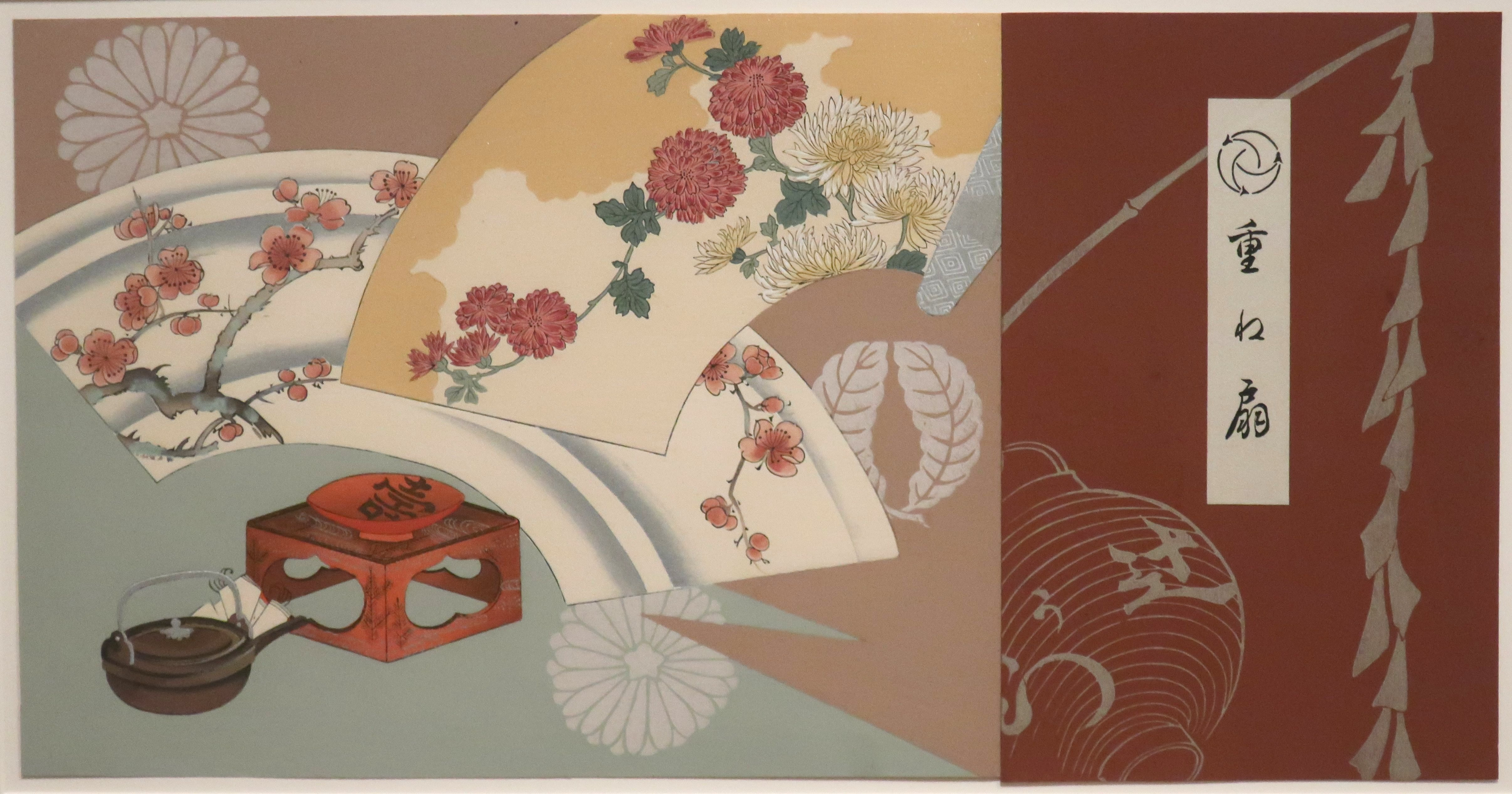
Kasane Ogi

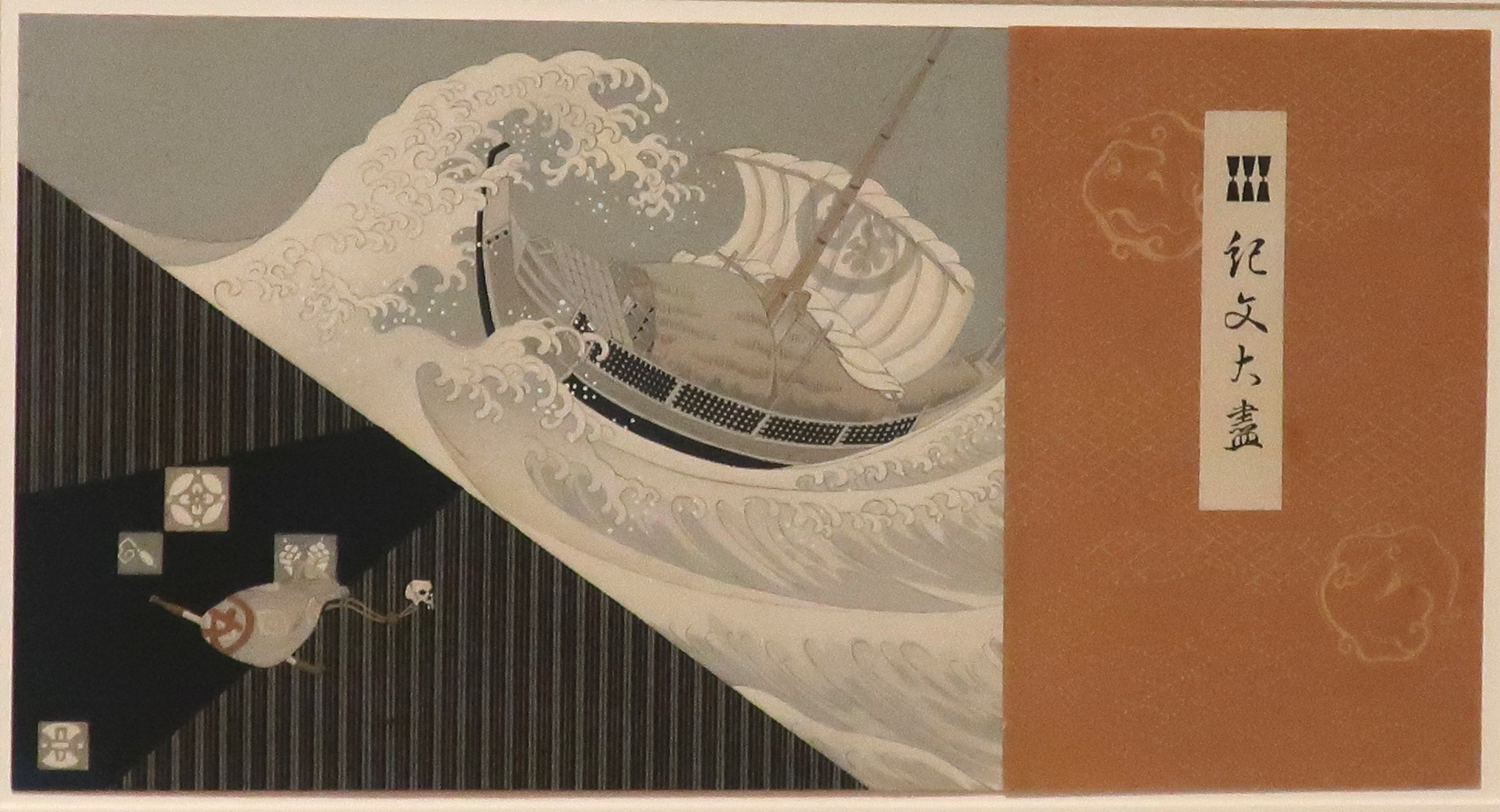
Kibun Daijin

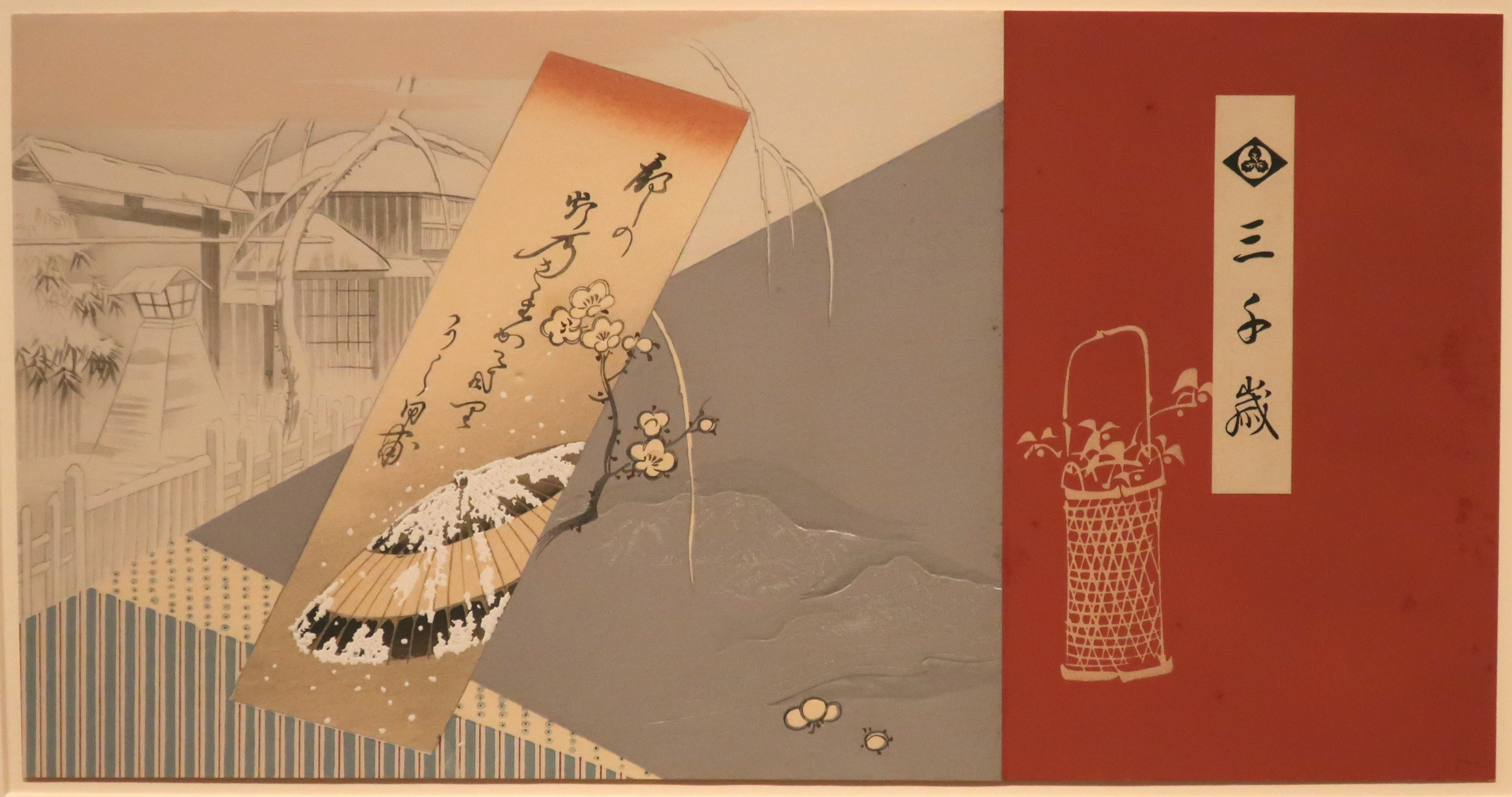
Michitose

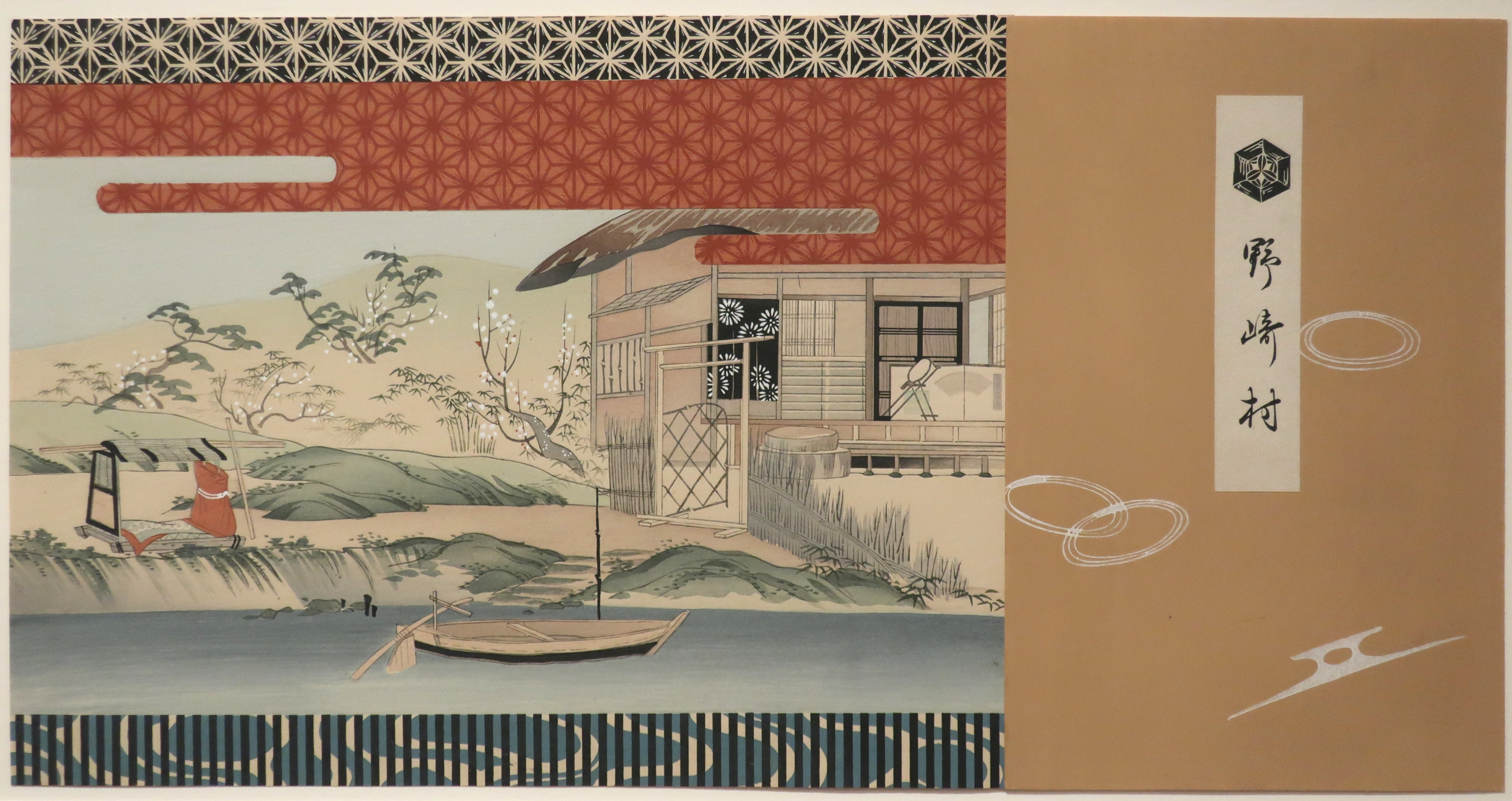
Nozaki Mura

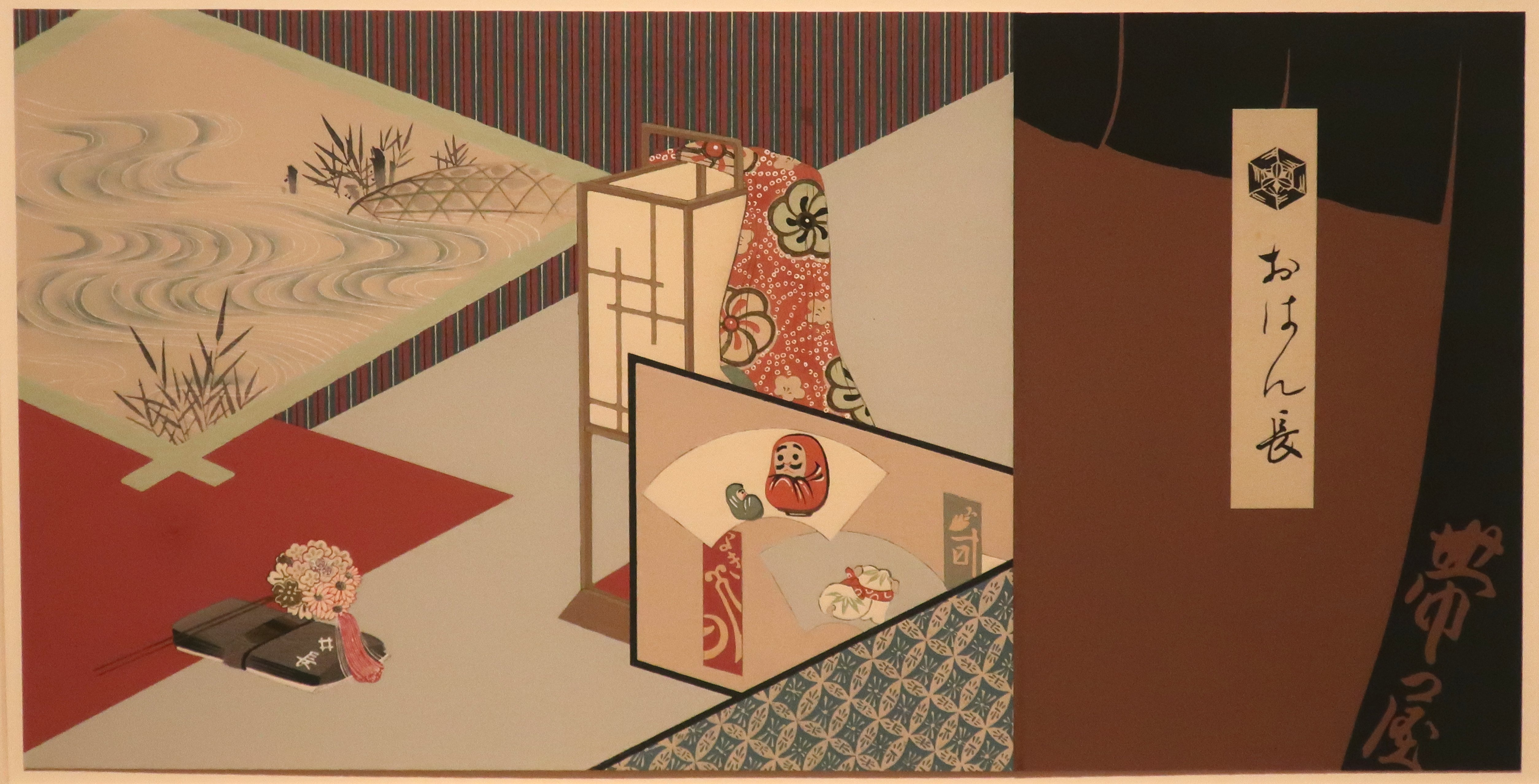
Ohancho

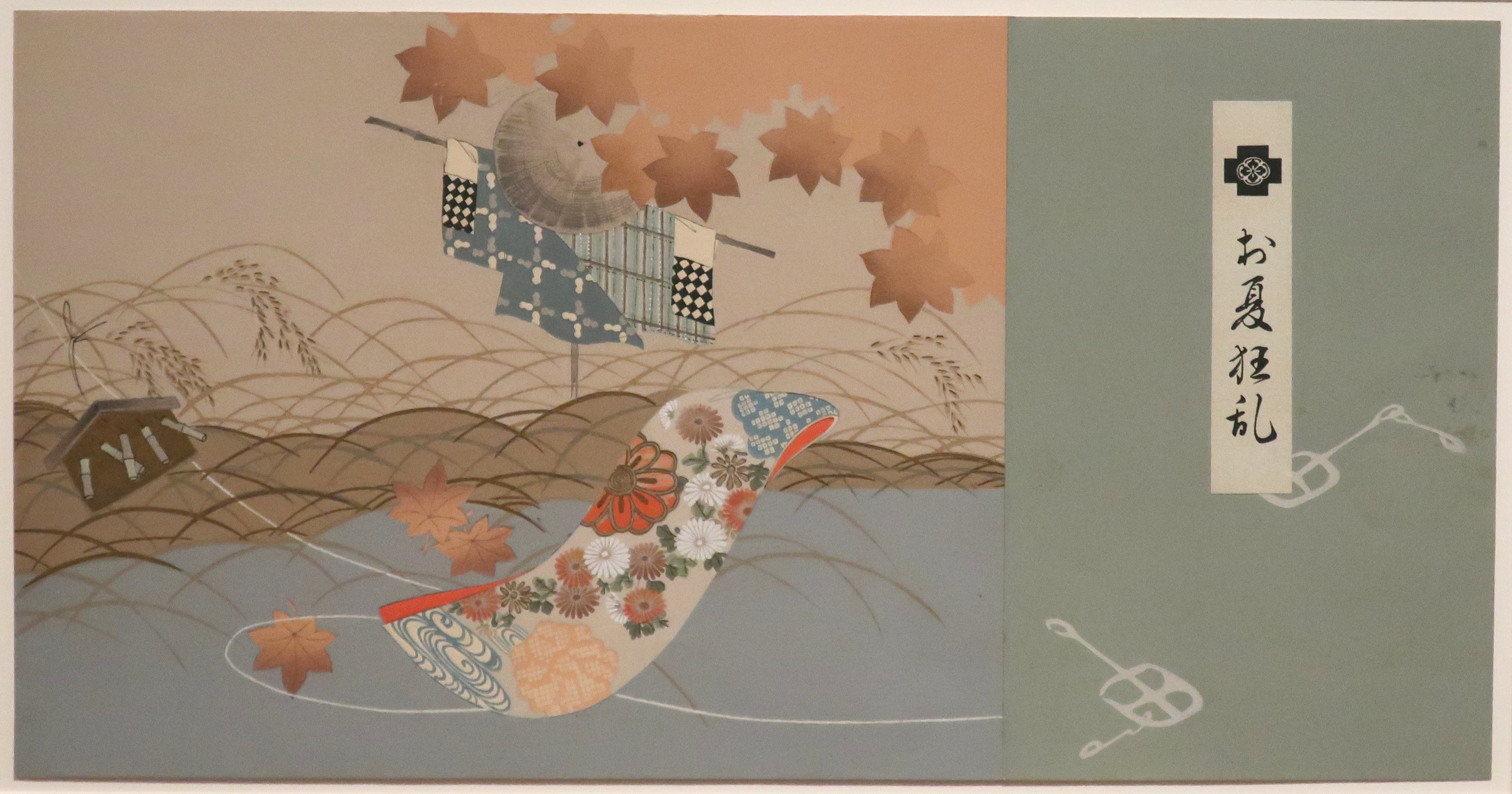
Onatsu Kyoran

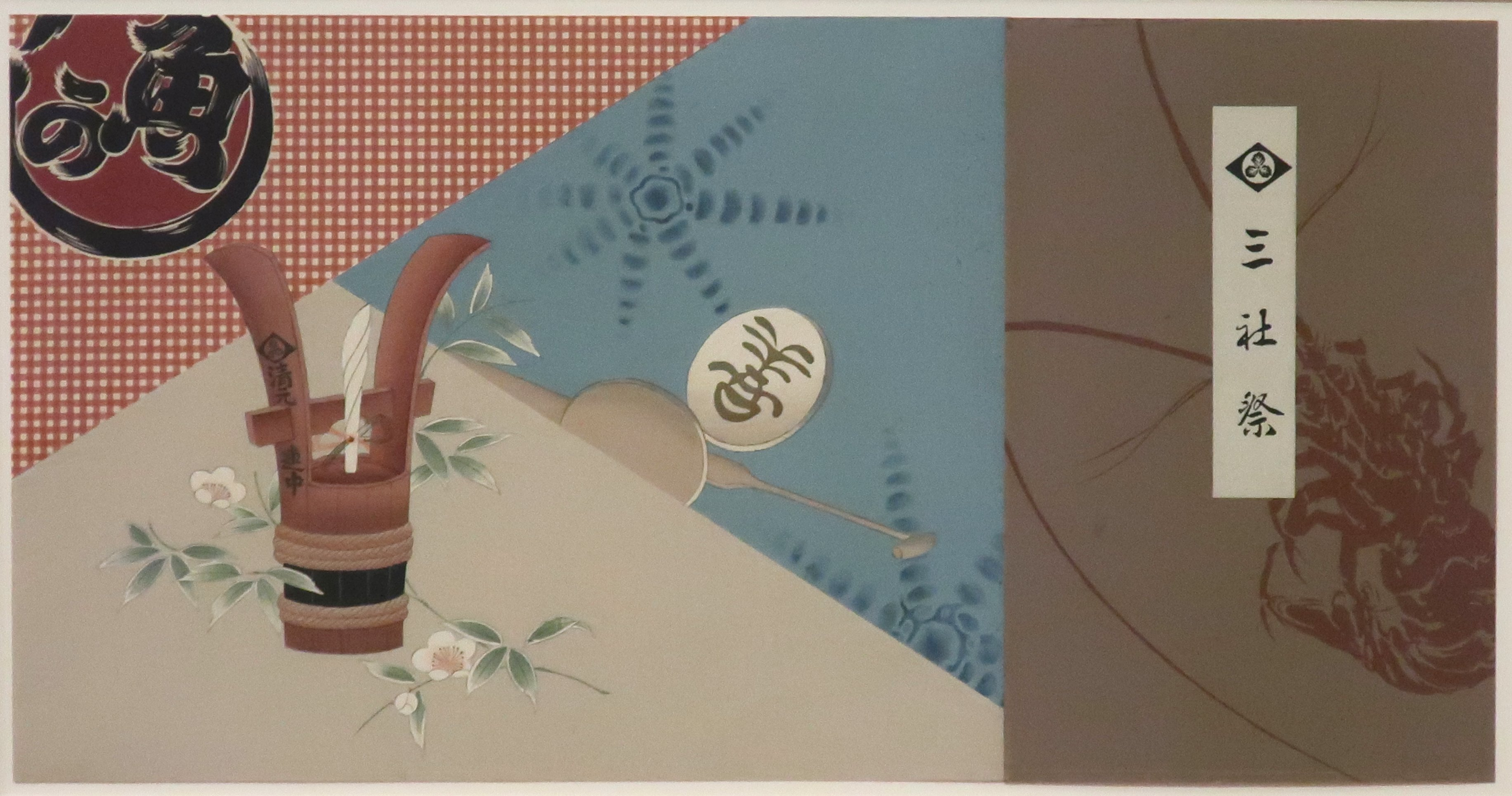
Sanja Matsuri

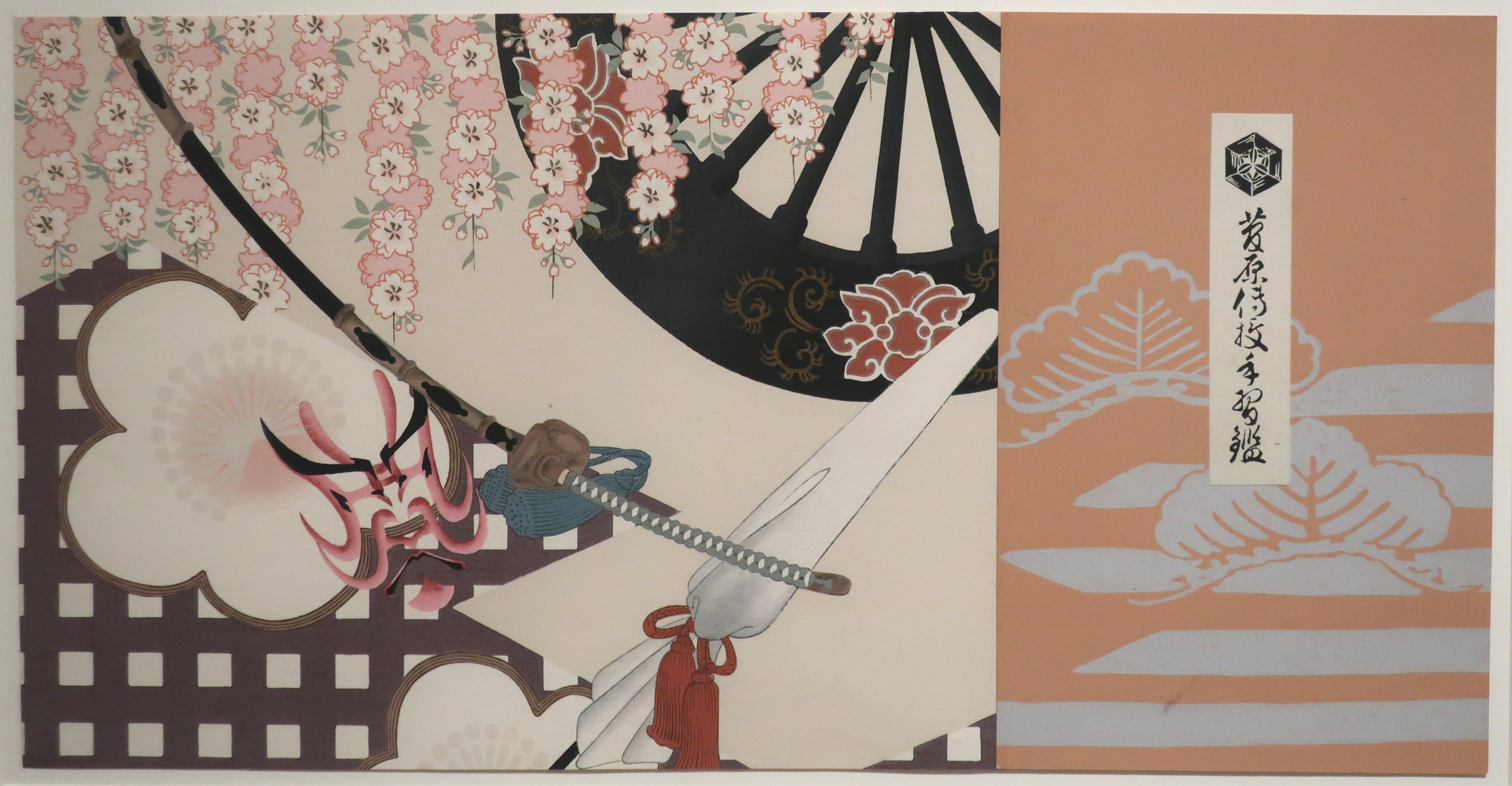
Sugawara Denju Tenarai Kagami

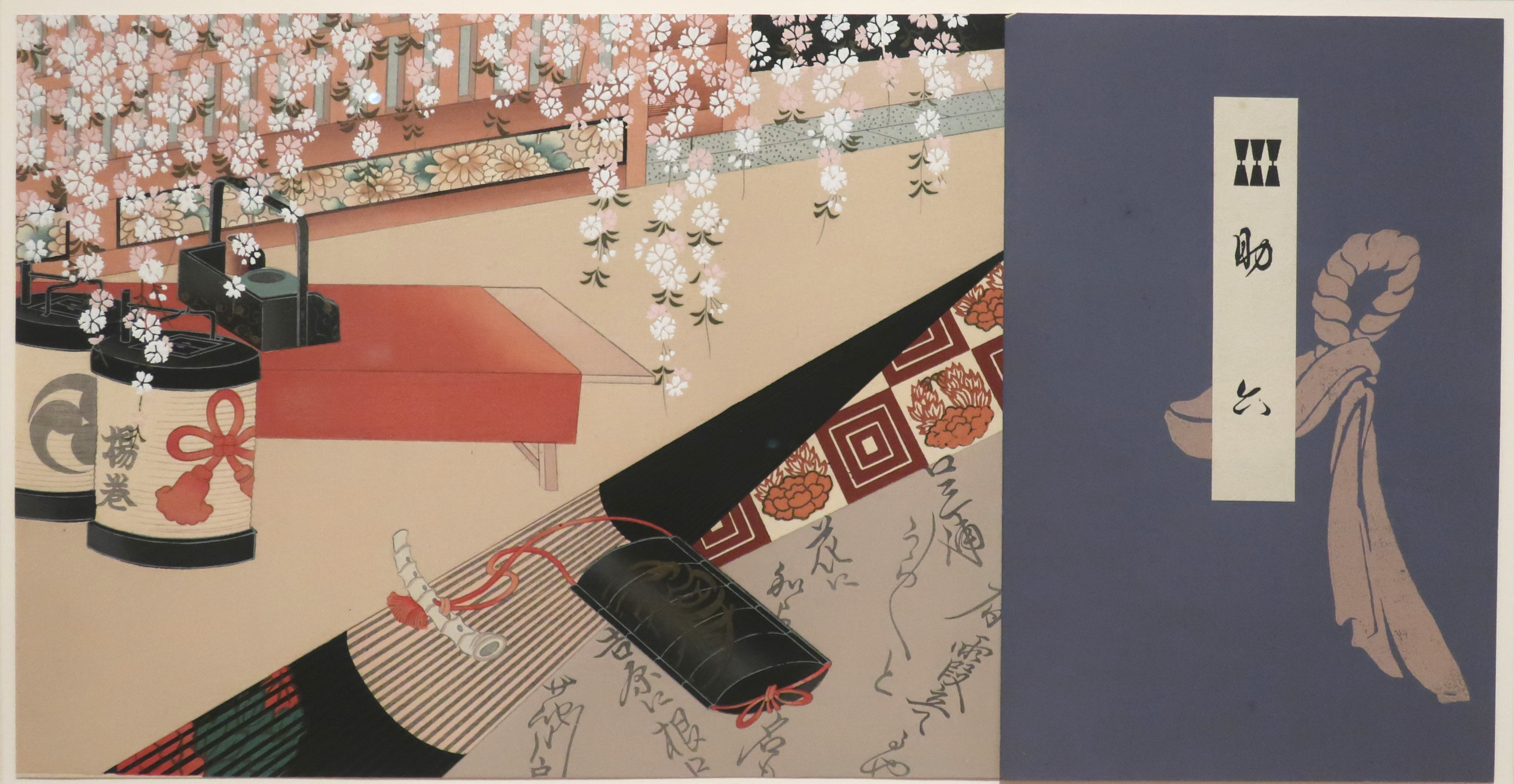
Sukeroku

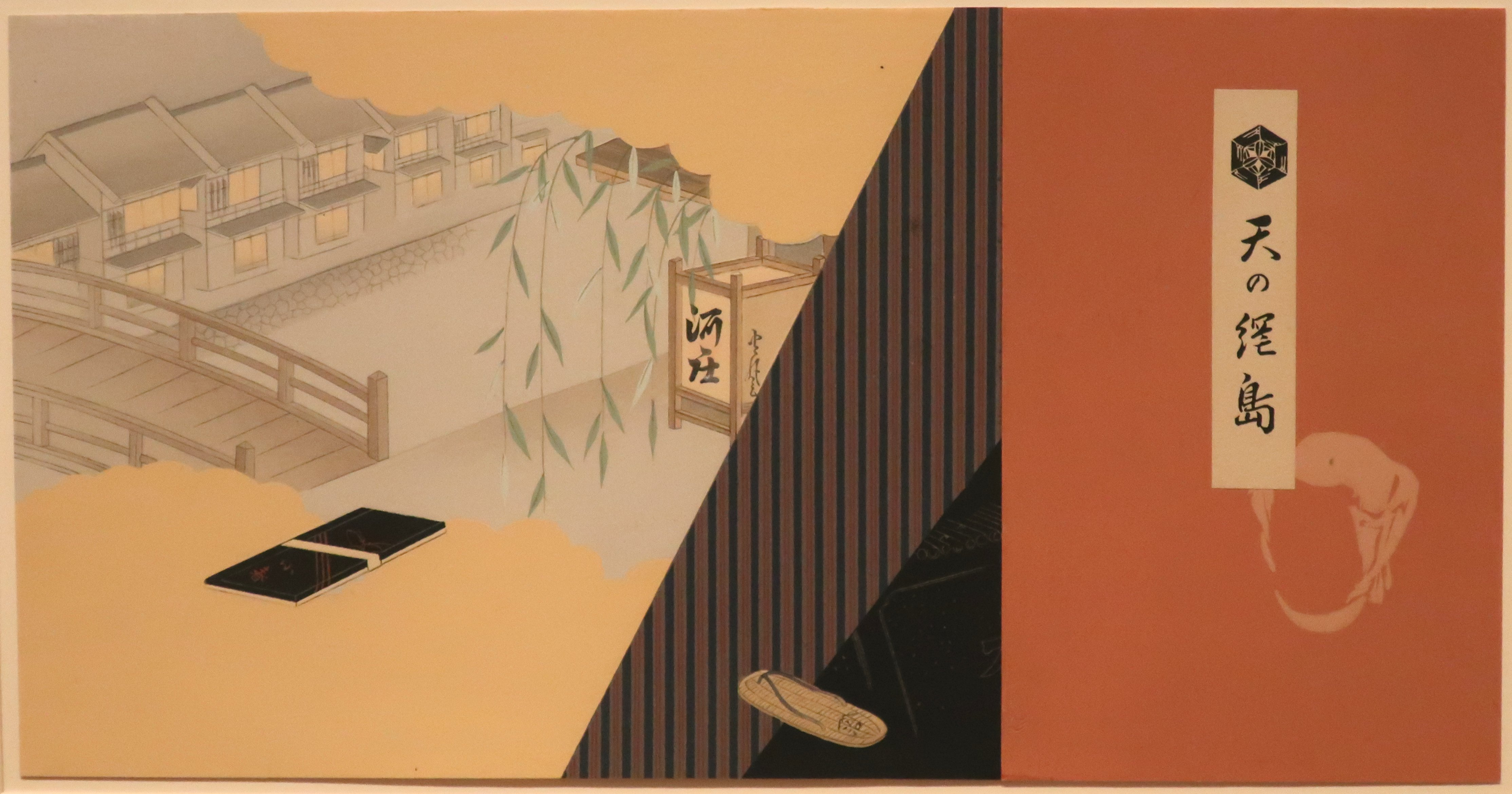
Ten no Amijima

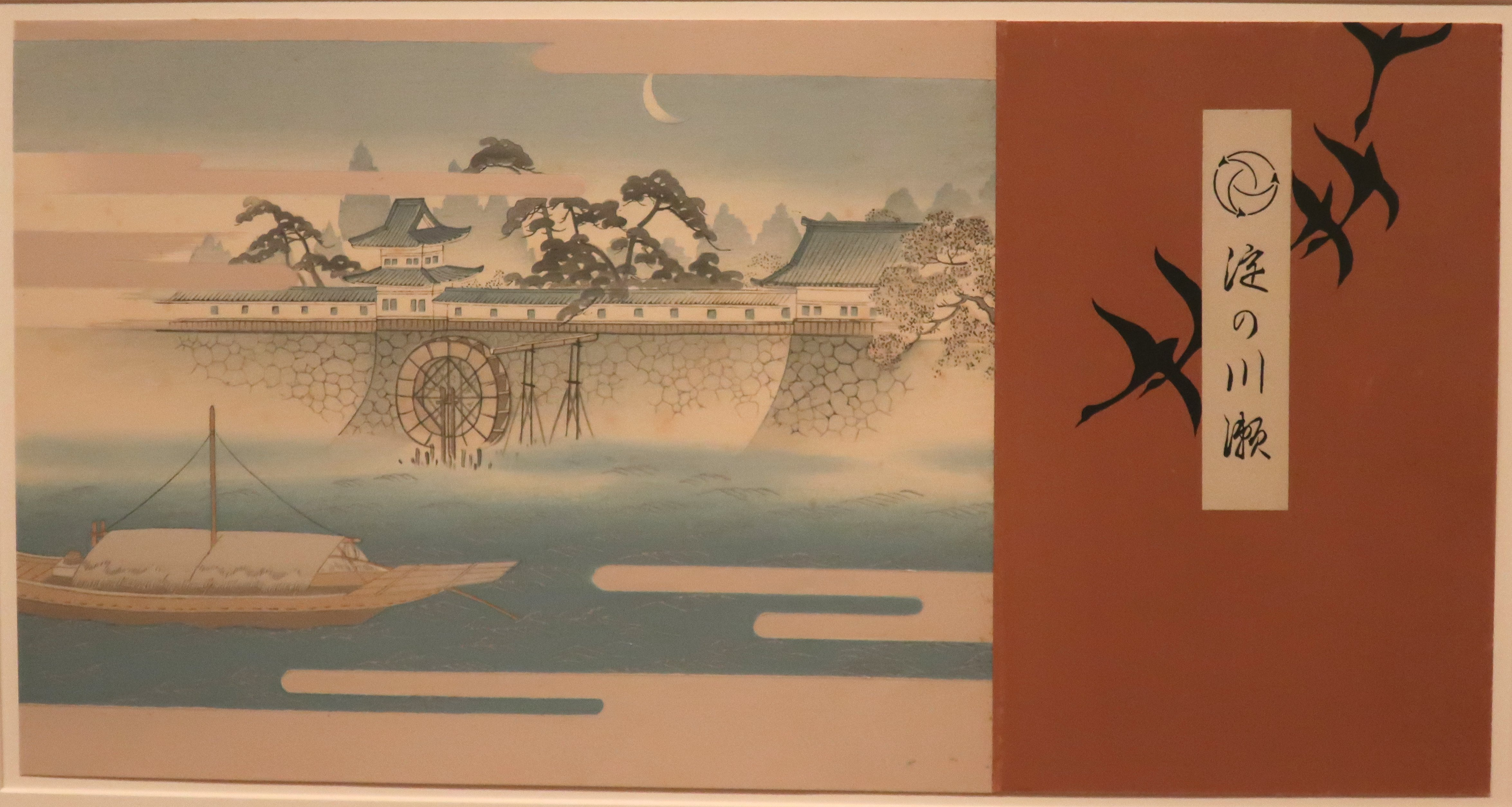
Yodo no Kawase
