= Naeja-dong =

- Interactive map of Naeja-dong
- Country: South Korea

Area
  - Total: 0.05 km^{2} (0.019 sq mi)

Korean name
- Hangul: 내자동
- Hanja: 內資洞
- RR: Naeja-dong
- MR: Naeja-dong

Naeja-dong (Korean: 내자동) is a dong (neighbourhood) of Jongno District, Seoul, South Korea. It is a legal dong (법정동) administered under its administrative dong (행정동), Sajik-dong.

== See also ==
- Administrative divisions of South Korea
