= Mingles (restaurant) =

Fine dining restaurant in Seoul, South Korea

- Interactive map of Mingles

Restaurant information
- Established: 2014
- Head chef: Mingoo Kang
- Food type: Contemporary Korean cuisine
- Rating: 3 Michelin stars
- Location: 2F, 19 Dosan-daero 67-gil, Gangnam District, Seoul, 06016, South Korea
- Coordinates: 37.5253°N 127.0441°E
- Website: www.restaurant-mingles.com

Mingles (Korean: 밍글스) is a fine dining restaurant in Cheongdam-dong, Gangnam District, Seoul, South Korea. It first opened in 2014. It serves contemporary Korean cuisine mixed with elements of other cuisines. It received two Michelin stars for 2024 and three in 2025. The restaurant was named the best restaurant in Korea by Asia's 50 Best Restaurants in 2024. A 2018 list by The Guardian ranked it in the top 10 best restaurants in Seoul.

== Description ==
The restaurant first opened in 2014, and moved to a larger location in the same neighborhood in 2019. Its chef-owner is Mingoo Kang (강민구). Kang trained under Martin Berasategui in San Sebastián, Spain. The name of the restaurant is a reference to mixing disparate elements into a cohesive whole. The restaurant received its first Michelin star in 2017, the first year the Michelin Guide was offered in Seoul. In 2023, it was reported that Kang also ran two other restaurants: Festa by Mingoo in Seoul and Hansik Goo in Hong Kong, the latter of which also received a Michelin star.

In 2017, it was reported that the restaurant offered a vegan menu. The restaurant reportedly focuses on the role of jang (fermented bean pastes) in Korean cuisine.

== See also ==
- Hyodo Chicken – A Korean fried chicken chain also run by Kang
- List of Michelin-starred restaurants in South Korea
