= List of Michelin-starred restaurants in South Korea =

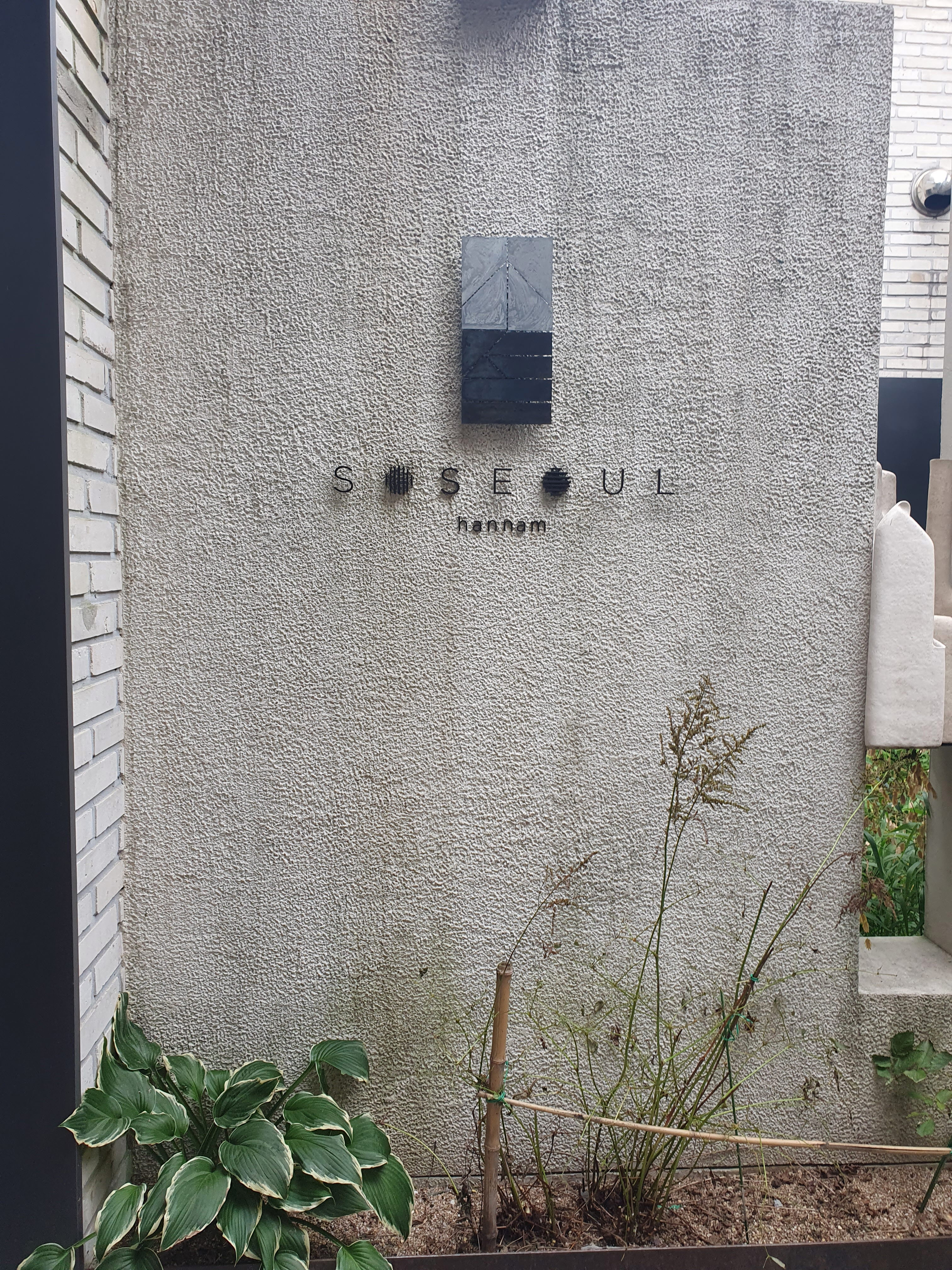
Sign outside of Soseoul Hannam

In the 2025 Michelin Guide, there are 40 restaurants in South Korea with a Michelin star rating. The Michelin Guides have been published by the French tire company Michelin since 1900. They were designed as a guide to tell drivers about eateries they recommended to visit and to subtly sponsor their tires, by encouraging drivers to use their cars more and therefore need to replace the tires as they wore out. Over time, the stars that were given out became more valuable.

Multiple anonymous Michelin inspectors visit the restaurants several times. They rate the restaurants on five criteria: "quality of products", "mastery of flavor and cooking techniques", "the personality of the chef represented in the dining experience", "value for money", and "consistency between inspectors' visits". Inspectors have at least ten years of expertise and create a list of popular restaurants supported by media reports, reviews, and diner popularity. If they reach a consensus, Michelin awards restaurants from one to three stars based on its evaluation methodology: one star means "high-quality cooking, worth a stop", two stars signify "excellent cooking, worth a detour", and three stars denote "exceptional cuisine, worth a special journey". The stars are not permanent and restaurants are constantly re-evaluated. If the criteria are not met, the restaurant will lose its stars.

The inaugural Seoul Michelin Guide was made for 2017 and released in November 2016. It was the fifth Guide in Asia, and was launched at the Shilla Hotel. After the creation of the Seoul Guide, local politician Song Ki-seok alleged that the Korean Tourism Organization paid Michelin roughly 2 billion won to bring the Guide to South Korea. Song alleged that the money included an initial payment of 100 million won in 2015, and 400 million won a year for four years, starting in 2016. He also criticized the Guide for what he alleged to be 34 errors, including typos, the inclusion of closed restaurants, mistranslations, and issues with whether or not the restaurants had terraces. Journalist Joe McPherson for Vogue Korea wrote in an opinion piece that the Guide was only for people who "are obsessed with Seoul's international status" and "aren't confident that Seoul can stand on its own as a restaurant capital". The Busan Guide was released for the first time in 2024 for that same year.

== Lists ==
Key
1 Michelin star	One Michelin star
2 Michelin stars	Two Michelin stars
3 Michelin stars	Three Michelin stars
—	The restaurant did not receive a star that year
Closed	The restaurant is no longer open

=== Seoul ===
Michelin-starred restaurants
Name	Cuisine	District	2017	2018	2019	2020	2021	2022	2023	2024	2025	2026
7th Door	Contemporary	Gangnam	—	—	—	—	1 Michelin star	1 Michelin star	1 Michelin star	1 Michelin star	1 Michelin star	1 Michelin star
Alla Prima	Innovative	Gangnam	1 Michelin star	1 Michelin star	2 Michelin stars	2 Michelin stars	2 Michelin stars	2 Michelin stars	2 Michelin stars	2 Michelin stars	2 Michelin stars	2 Michelin stars
Allen	Contemporary	Gangnam	—	—	—	—	—	—	1 Michelin star	2 Michelin stars	2 Michelin stars	2 Michelin stars
Auprès	French	Seocho	—	—	—	1 Michelin star	1 Michelin star	1 Michelin star	Closed			
Balwoo Gongyang	Korean temple	Jongno	1 Michelin star	1 Michelin star	1 Michelin star	1 Michelin star	—	—	—	—	—	—
Bicena	Korean	Songpa	1 Michelin star	1 Michelin star	1 Michelin star	1 Michelin star	1 Michelin star	1 Michelin star	1 Michelin star	1 Michelin star	1 Michelin star	1 Michelin star
Boreumsae	Barbecue	Gangnam	1 Michelin star	—	—	—	—	—	—	—	—	—
Collage	French	Gangnam	—	—	—	—	—	—	—	—	—	1 Michelin star
Dining in Space	French	Jongno	1 Michelin star	1 Michelin star	1 Michelin star	Closed						
Dosa	Korean	Gangnam	—	1 Michelin star	1 Michelin star	1 Michelin star	—	Closed				
Eatanic Garden	Korean Contemporary	Gangnam	—	—	—	—	—	—	1 Michelin star	1 Michelin star	1 Michelin star	1 Michelin star
Escondido	Mexican	Yongsan	—	—	—	—	—	—	—	—	1 Michelin star	1 Michelin star
Evett	Innovative	Gangnam	—	—	—	1 Michelin star	1 Michelin star	1 Michelin star	1 Michelin star	1 Michelin star	2 Michelin stars	2 Michelin stars
Exquisine	Contemporary	Gangnam	—	1 Michelin star	1 Michelin star	1 Michelin star	1 Michelin star	1 Michelin star	1 Michelin star	1 Michelin star	1 Michelin star	1 Michelin star
Gaon	Korean	Gangnam	3 Michelin stars	3 Michelin stars	3 Michelin stars	3 Michelin stars	3 Michelin stars	3 Michelin stars	3 Michelin stars	Closed		
Gaggen by Choi Junho	Japanese	Gangnam	—	—	—	—	—	—	—	—	—	1 Michelin star
Gigas	Mediterranean	Jung	—	—	—	—	—	—	—	—	1 Michelin star	1 Michelin star
GiwaKang	Contemporary	Gangnam	—	—	—	—	—	—	—	—	—	1 Michelin star
Gotan	Korean	Yeongdeungpo	2 Michelin stars	2 Michelin stars	1 Michelin star	1 Michelin star	—	—	—	—	—	—
Goryori Ken	Contemporary	Gangnam	—	—	—	—	—	1 Michelin star	1 Michelin star	1 Michelin star	1 Michelin star	1 Michelin star
Hami	Jinju	Gangnam	1 Michelin star	—	—	—	—	—	—	—	—	—
Haobin	Chinese	Jung	—	—	—	—	—	—	—	1 Michelin star	1 Michelin star	—
Hansikgonggan	Korean	Jongno	—	—	1 Michelin star	1 Michelin star	1 Michelin star	—	—	—	—	—
Hakusi	Japanese	Gangnam	—	—	—	—	—	—	—	—	—	1 Michelin star
HANE	Japanese	Gangnam	—	—	—	—	—	1 Michelin star	1 Michelin star	1 Michelin star	1 Michelin star	—
Ilpan	Teppanyaki	Gangnam	—	—	—	—	—	—	1 Michelin star	—	—	—
Jin Jin	Chinese	Mapo	1 Michelin star	1 Michelin star	1 Michelin star	—	—	—	—	—	—	—
Joo Ok	Korean	Jung	—	1 Michelin star	1 Michelin star	1 Michelin star	1 Michelin star	2 Michelin stars	2 Michelin stars	Closed		
Jueun	Korean	Jongno	—	—	—	—	—	—	—	—	—	1 Michelin star
Jungsik	Contemporary	Gangnam	1 Michelin star	2 Michelin stars	2 Michelin stars	2 Michelin stars	2 Michelin stars	2 Michelin stars	2 Michelin stars	2 Michelin stars	2 Michelin stars	2 Michelin stars
Kang Minchul Restaurant	Contemporary	Gangnam	—	—	—	—	—	—	1 Michelin star	1 Michelin star	1 Michelin star	1 Michelin star
Keunkiwajip	Korean	Jongno	1 Michelin star	1 Michelin star	—	—	—	—	—	—	—	—
Kojacha	Asian	Gangnam	—	—	—	—	—	1 Michelin star	1 Michelin star	1 Michelin star	—	—
Kojima	Sushi	Gangnam	1 Michelin star	2 Michelin stars	2 Michelin stars	2 Michelin stars	2 Michelin stars	2 Michelin stars	2 Michelin stars	2 Michelin stars	2 Michelin stars	—
Kwonsooksoo	Korean	Gangnam	2 Michelin stars	2 Michelin stars	2 Michelin stars	2 Michelin stars	2 Michelin stars	2 Michelin stars	2 Michelin stars	2 Michelin stars	2 Michelin stars	2 Michelin stars
La Yeon	Korean	Jung	3 Michelin stars	3 Michelin stars	3 Michelin stars	3 Michelin stars	3 Michelin stars	3 Michelin stars	2 Michelin stars	2 Michelin stars	2 Michelin stars	2 Michelin stars
L'Amitié	French	Gangnam	1 Michelin star	1 Michelin star	1 Michelin star	1 Michelin star	1 Michelin star	1 Michelin star	1 Michelin star	1 Michelin star	1 Michelin star	1 Michelin star
L'Amant Secret	Contemporary	Jung	—	—	—	—	1 Michelin star	1 Michelin star	1 Michelin star	1 Michelin star	1 Michelin star	1 Michelin star
L'Impression	Contemporary	Gangnam	—	—	—	2 Michelin stars	2 Michelin stars	—	—	—	Closed	
Légume	Vegetarian	Gangnam	—	—	—	—	—	—	—	—	1 Michelin star	1 Michelin star
Lee Jong Kuk 104	Korean	Seongbuk	—	—	1 Michelin star	—	—	—	—	—	Closed	
Mingles	Korean	Gangnam	1 Michelin star	1 Michelin star	2 Michelin stars	2 Michelin stars	2 Michelin stars	2 Michelin stars	2 Michelin stars	2 Michelin stars	3 Michelin stars	3 Michelin stars
Mitou	Japanese	Gangnam	—	—	—	—	1 Michelin star	1 Michelin star	1 Michelin star	2 Michelin stars	2 Michelin stars	2 Michelin stars
Mosu	Innovative	Yongsan	—	—	1 Michelin star	2 Michelin stars	2 Michelin stars	2 Michelin stars	3 Michelin stars	3 Michelin stars	Closed	2 Michelin stars
Muoki	Contemporary	Gangnam	—	—	1 Michelin star	1 Michelin star	1 Michelin star	1 Michelin star	1 Michelin star	1 Michelin star	1 Michelin star	1 Michelin star
Muni	Japanese	Gangnam	—	—	—	—	1 Michelin star	1 Michelin star	1 Michelin star	1 Michelin star	1 Michelin star	1 Michelin star
Myomi	Innovative	Jongno	—	—	—	1 Michelin star	1 Michelin star	1 Michelin star	1 Michelin star	—	—	—
Onjium	Korean	Jongno	—	—	—	1 Michelin star	1 Michelin star	1 Michelin star	1 Michelin star	1 Michelin star	1 Michelin star	1 Michelin star
Pierre Gagnaire	French	Jung	2 Michelin stars	—	—	1 Michelin star	1 Michelin star	1 Michelin star	1 Michelin star	—	—	—
Poom	Korean	Yongsan	1 Michelin star	1 Michelin star	1 Michelin star	1 Michelin star	1 Michelin star	—	—	—	—	—
Ristorante EO	Italian	Gangnam	1 Michelin star	1 Michelin star	—	—	—	—	—	—	—	—
SAN	Innovative	Gangnam	—	—	—	—	—	—	—	—	—	1 Michelin star
Solbam	Contemporary	Gangnam	—	—	—	—	—	—	1 Michelin star	1 Michelin star	1 Michelin star	1 Michelin star
Soigné	Innovative	Gangnam	1 Michelin star	1 Michelin star	1 Michelin star	1 Michelin star	1 Michelin star	1 Michelin star	2 Michelin stars	2 Michelin stars	2 Michelin stars	2 Michelin stars
Soul	Contemporary	Yongsan	—	—	—	—	—	—	1 Michelin star	1 Michelin star	1 Michelin star	1 Michelin star
Sosuheon	Sushi	Jung	—	—	—	—	—	—	—	—	1 Michelin star	2 Michelin stars
Soseoul Hannam	Korean	Gangnam	—	—	—	—	—	1 Michelin star	1 Michelin star	1 Michelin star	1 Michelin star	1 Michelin star
STAY	French	Songpa	—	—	1 Michelin star	1 Michelin star	1 Michelin star	—	—	—	—	—
Sushi Kanesaka	Japanese	Gangnam	—	—	—	—	—	—	—	—	—	1 Michelin star
Sushi Matsumoto	Japanese	Gangnam	—	—	—	—	—	1 Michelin star	1 Michelin star	1 Michelin star	1 Michelin star	1 Michelin star
Sushi Sanghyeon	Japanese	Gangnam	—	—	—	—	—	1 Michelin star	—	—	—	—
Table for Four	Contemporary	Seocho	—	1 Michelin star	1 Michelin star	1 Michelin star	1 Michelin star	—	—	—	—	—
Terreno	Spanish	Jongno	—	—	—	1 Michelin star	1 Michelin star	1 Michelin star	—	—	—	—
Twenty Four Seasons	Korean	Gangnam	1 Michelin star	—	—	—	—	—	—	—	—	—
tutoiement	French	Seongdong	—	—	—	—	—	—	—	—	1 Michelin star	1 Michelin star
Vinho	Contemporary	Gangnam	—	—	—	—	—	—	—	1 Michelin star	1 Michelin star	1 Michelin star
Votre Maison	French	Gangnam	1 Michelin star	1 Michelin star	—	1 Michelin star	1 Michelin star	—	—	—	Closed	
y'east	Contemporary	Gangnam	—	—	—	—	—	—	—	—	1 Michelin star	1 Michelin star
Yu Yuan	Chinese	Jongno	1 Michelin star	1 Michelin star	1 Michelin star	1 Michelin star	1 Michelin star	—	—	—	1 Michelin star	1 Michelin star
YUN	Korean	Gangnam	—	—	—	—	—	1 Michelin star	1 Michelin star	1 Michelin star	1 Michelin star	1 Michelin star
Zero Complex	Innovative	Jung	1 Michelin star	1 Michelin star	1 Michelin star	1 Michelin star	1 Michelin star	1 Michelin star	1 Michelin star	1 Michelin star	1 Michelin star	1 Michelin star
References												

=== Busan ===
Michelin-starred restaurants
Name	Cuisine	District	2024	2025	2026
Fiotto	Italian	Haeundae	1 Michelin star	1 Michelin star	1 Michelin star
Le DORER	Korean	Haeundae	—	—	1 Michelin star
Mori	Japanese	Haeundae	1 Michelin star	1 Michelin star	1 Michelin star
Palate	Contemporary	Nam	1 Michelin star	1 Michelin star	1 Michelin star
References					

== See also ==
- List of oldest restaurants in South Korea
