= Quince (restaurant) =

Restaurant in San Francisco, California

- Interactive map of Quince

Restaurant information
- Established: 2003; 23 years ago
- Owners: Michael Tusk, Lindsay Tusk
- Head chef: Michael Tusk
- Chef: Keegan Tokumura
- Food type: Contemporary Californian & Italian cuisine
- Rating: 3 Michelin stars 1 Michelin green star
- Location: 470 Pacific Ave, San Francisco, California, 94133, United States
- Coordinates: 37.797566°N 122.403396°W
- Website: quincerestaurant.com

Quince is a restaurant in the Jackson Square neighborhood in San Francisco, California. Opened in 2003 by chef Michael Tusk and his wife, Lindsay Tusk, in Pacific Heights, the restaurant has been located in Jackson Square since 2009. A sister restaurant, Cotogna, opened next door in 2011. The couple opened a third establishment, Verjus, a wine bar and restaurant in the same neighborhood, in 2019.

In 2017, Quince became only the sixth restaurant in the San Francisco Bay Area to be awarded three Michelin stars by the Michelin Guide.

The Tusks partner with Fresh Run Farms of Bolinas in sourcing exclusive produce. The restaurant also features a global selection of caviar. Until 2023, a prepaid ten-course tasting menu was the only dining option. In 2023, Quince closed for 11 months, reopening in spring 2024 with a four-course dinner and à la carte dining available as alternatives in the salon and bar, while the tasting menu continues to be served in the dining room for $390 per person.

== Awards ==
Quince was awarded one Michelin star in the debut San Francisco Bay Area Michelin Guide in 2007, a second Michelin star in 2014, and a third Michelin star in 2017.

For his cuisine at Quince, the James Beard Foundation awarded Michael Tusk the James Beard Foundation Award Best Chef – Pacific in 2011 and the James Beard Award for Outstanding Chef in 2026. Tusk was previously nominated for Outstanding Chef in 2016, and for the James Beard Award for Outstanding Service in 2014. and for the James Beard Foundation Award

Michael Bauer, the former restaurant critic for San Francisco Chronicle, awarded the restaurant four stars in 2015 and included it in the Chronicle's annual Top 100 Restaurants. Since Bauer's retirement, it has continued to be included in the newspaper's Top 100 lists in 2025 and 2026.

== See also ==
- List of Michelin 3-star restaurants
- List of Michelin 3-star restaurants in the United States
- List of Michelin-starred restaurants in California
