= German Korean =

German Korean or Korean German may refer to:

- Germans in Korea
- Koreans in Germany
- Germany–North Korea relations
- Germany–South Korea relations
