= German North Korean =

German North Korean or North Korean German may refer to:

- Germans in North Korea
- North Koreans in Germany
- Germany–North Korea relations
- Multiracial people of German and North Korean descent
