= German South Korean =

German South Korean or South Korean German may refer to:

- Germans in Korea
- Koreans in Germany
- Germany–South Korea relations
- Multiracial people of German and South Korean descent
