= List of ambassadors of North Korea to Germany =

Coordinates: 52.51131°N 13.386231°E

Ambassador of North Korea to Germany Embassy of North Korea, Berlin
- 주 도이췰란드조선민주주의인민공화국 특명전권대사
- Emblem of North Korea

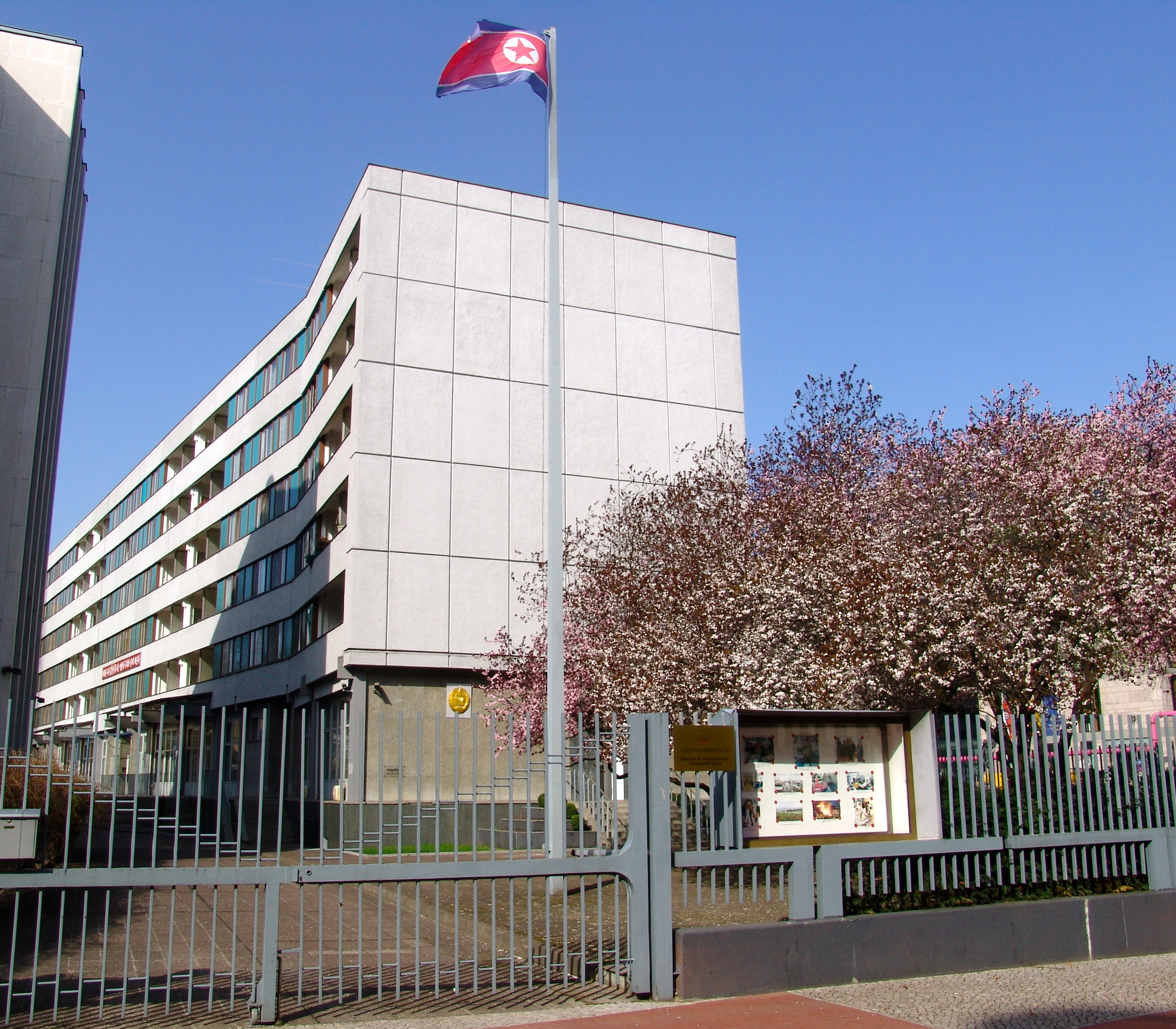
- Incumbent; Kim Chol Jun (provisional) since <2024
- Reports to: Ministry of Foreign Affairs
- Residence: Sundelfinger Straße 38 in Berlin-Karlshorst, Germany
- Term length: No fixed term
- Inaugural holder: Pak Hyon-bo
- Formation: October 9, 2001

The North Korean Ambassador to Germany is the official representative of the Government in Pyongyang to the Government of Germany. The Ambassador lives in Berlin.

== List of representatives ==
Date of Diplomatic agrément/Diplomatic accreditation	Ambassador	Observations	Leader of North Korea	Chancellor of Germany	Term end
	Lu Qiuitian	North Korean interests section of the Chinese embassy (Protecting Power People's Republic of China).	Kim Jong-il	Helmut Kohl	
	Ri San Yu	Reported ambassador during 1998.	Kim Jong-il	Helmut Kohl	
March 1, 2001	The governments in Berlin and Pyongyang established diplomatic relations.		Kim Jong-il	Gerhard Schröder	
October 9, 2001	Pak Hyon-bo	North Korea named Pak Hyon-bo as its first ambassador to the federal Republic of Germany. *Radio Pyongyang said on Oct. 9 he presented his credentials to President Johannes Rau five days earlier Pyongyang established its embassy in Berlin seven months after diplomatic relations were set up between North Korea and Germany.	Kim Jong-il	Gerhard Schröder	
January 26, 2006	Chang Il-hong	홍창일 = "Hong Chang-il" Editors: Please find info on this.	Kim Jong-il	Angela Merkel	
September 2, 2011	Si Hong-ri	He almost finished his role as ambassador in April, 2016, but the nominated replacement was rejected by the German government. Replaced by Pak Nam Yong in late January 2017.	Kim Jong-il	Angela Merkel	January 20, 2017
April 24, 2017	Nam Jong-pak	He is also known as Pak Nam Yong. The Korean Central News Agency (KCNA), North Korea’s Supreme People’s Assembly (SPA) decreed that an official named Pak Nam Yong would be the new Ambassador on January 23, 2017. Still in office during 2018.	Kim Jong-un	Angela Merkel	
	Lee Si Hong		Kim Jong-un	Angela Merkel	
	Kim Chol Jun	Since at least 2024, provisional.	Kim Jong-un	Olaf Scholz	
	Kim Chol Jun	Since at least 2024, provisional.	Kim Jong-un	Friedrich Mertz	

== See also ==
- Germany–North Korea relations
- List of ambassadors of North Korea to East Germany
