= List of ambassadors of North Korea to East Germany =

Coordinates: 52.51131°N 13.386231°E

Ambassador of North Korea to East Germany
- 주 동도이췰란드조선민주주의인민공화국 특명전권대사
- Emblem of North Korea

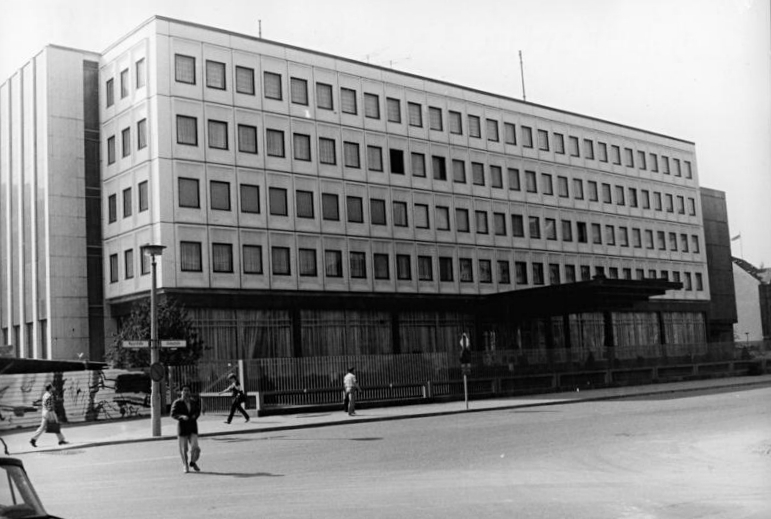
- Reports to: Ministry of Foreign Affairs
- Residence: Sundelfinger Straße 38 in Berlin-Karlshorst, East Germany
- Term length: No fixed term
- Inaugural holder: Pak Kil-jon
- Formation: May 13, 1954
- Final holder: Pak Yong-chan
- Abolished: October 3, 1990

The North Korean ambassador to East Germany in East Berlin was the official representative of the Government in Pyongyang to the Government of East Germany. Until 1979, the address of the embassy was Sundelfinger Straße 38 in Berlin-Karlshorst.

== List of representatives ==
Diplomatic agrément	Diplomatic accreditation	Ambassador	Spelling according to Allgemeiner Deutscher Nachrichtendienst	Spelling according to Tŭk-Chu Chŏn	Leader of North Korea	Vorsitzender des Staatsrats	Term end
November 1, 1949				The governments in East Berlin and Pyongyang established diplomatic relations.	Kim Il Sung	Walter Ulbricht	
March 6, 1954	May 13, 1954	Pak Kil-jon	Pak Kil Jon	Pak Kil Jon	Kim Il Sung	Walter Ulbricht	
May 9, 1957	July 10, 1957	Pak Il-young	Pak Ir Jen	Pak Il Young	Kim Il Sung	Walter Ulbricht	
February 16, 1961	April 13, 1961	Kwon Young-tae	Kwon Jeng Tae	Kwon Young Tae	Kim Il Sung	Walter Ulbricht	
July 29, 1966	August 16, 1966	Ro Su-uk	Ro Su Ek	Ro Su Uk (Yuk)	Kim Il Sung	Walter Ulbricht	
December 1, 1969	December 15, 1969	Ri Dzang-su	Ri Dzang Su	Li Dzang Su	Kim Il Sung	Walter Ulbricht	
September 1, 1977	September 1, 1977	Kim Kuk-hun	Kim Kuk Hun	Kim Kuk Hun	Kim Il Sung	Erich Honecker	
July 3, 1980	July 2, 1980	Pak Hyon-bo	Pak Hjon Bo	Pak Hyon Bo	Kim Il Sung	Erich Honecker	
August 23, 1985	August 23, 1985	Pak Yong-chan	Pak Yong Chan		Kim Il Sung	Erich Honecker	
October 3, 1990					Kim Il Sung	Manfred Gerlach	

== See also ==
- Germany–North Korea relations
- List of ambassadors of North Korea to Germany
