= DSSI =

DSSI may refer to:

- Digital Storage Systems Interconnect
- Disposable Soft Synth Interface
- German School Seoul International (Deutsche Schule Seoul International)
