= Hannam-dong =

Neighborhood of Seoul, South Korea

Coordinates: 37.5380°N 127.0065°E

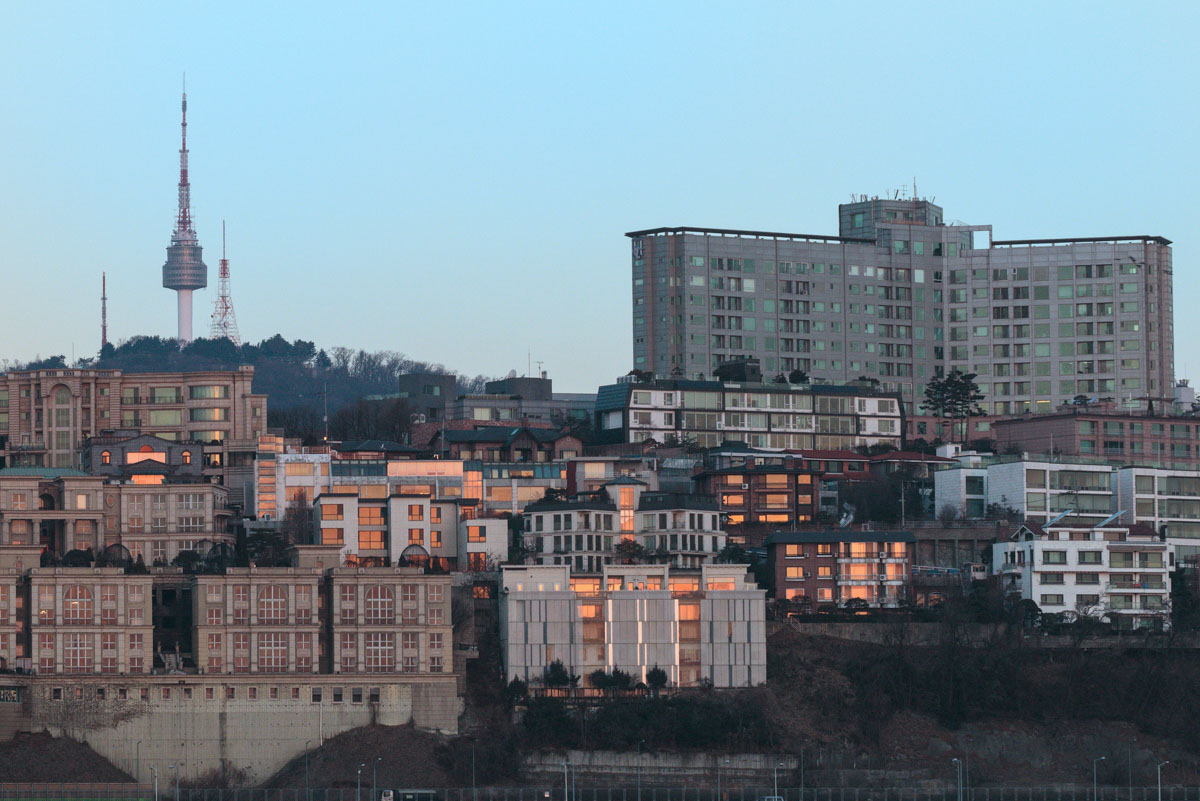
- Hannam-dong and Seoul Tower from across the Han

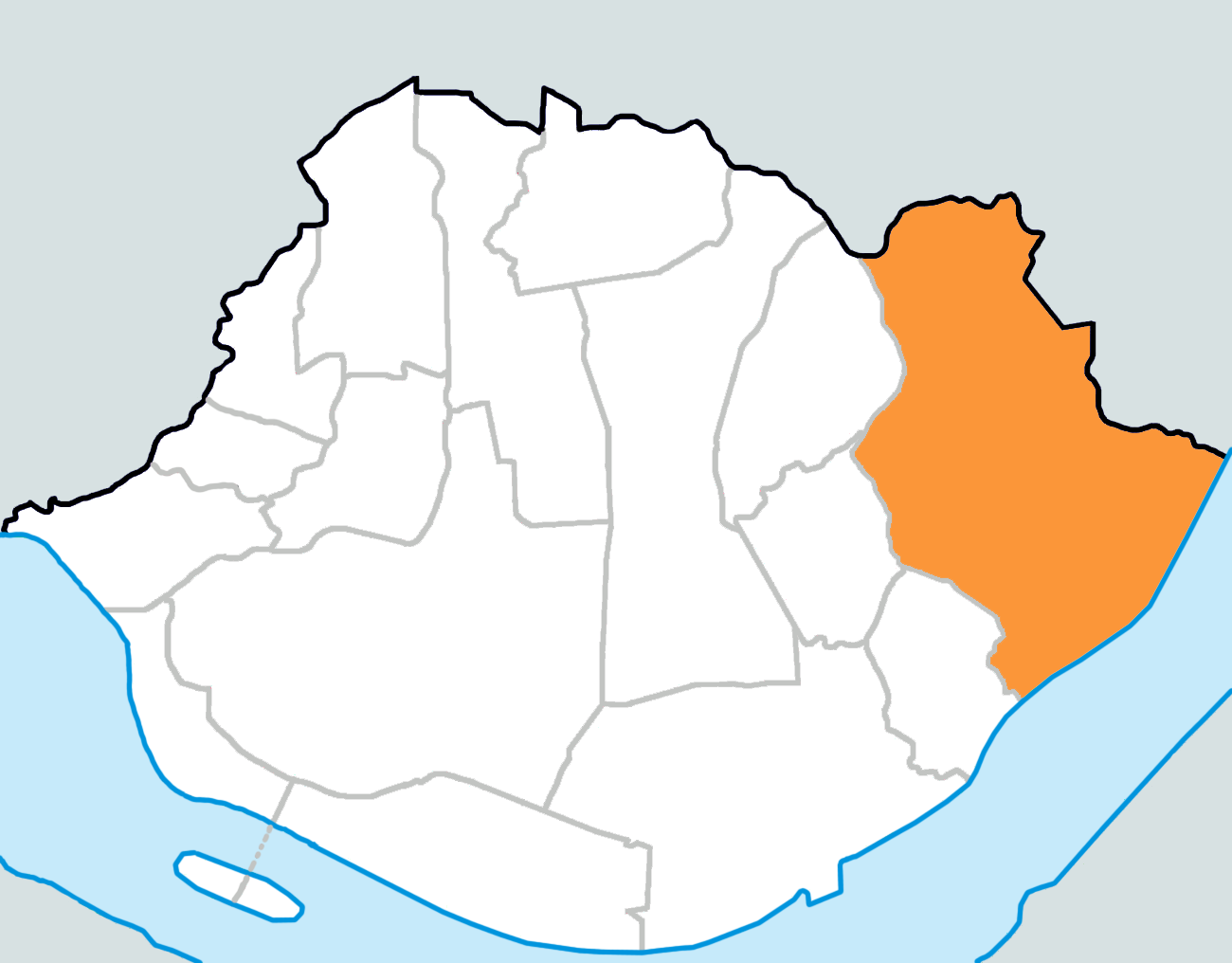
- Country: South Korea

Area
  - Total: 2.98 km^{2} (1.15 sq mi)

Population (2013)
  - Total: 22,934
  - Density: 7,700/km^{2} (19,900/sq mi)

Korean name
- Hangul: 한남동
- Hanja: 漢南洞
- RR: Hannam-dong
- MR: Hannam-dong

Hannam-dong (Korean: 한남동) is a wealthy dong (neighborhood) of Yongsan District, Seoul, South Korea. It has been portrayed continuously in South Korea's popular culture as an oasis of wealth and luxury, thus becoming the subject of numerous domestic films, television series, and popular music references.

Initially not included within the Yongsan ward, during the Japanese colonial period it was a small hamlet called Han River Village (한강리/漢江里) within the Hanji township (한지면/漢芝面), Goyang County (고양군/高陽郡) and lying close to the Han River.

Being right across the river from the Gangnam area of Seoul and its proximity to locations in northern Seoul makes the neighborhood centrally located in Seoul. Many celebrities and executives live in three well known residential areas in the neighborhood: UN Village, The Hill, and Nine One Hannam. Beginning in the 2010s, the area has grown into a trendy hotspot both day and night with upscale boutique cafes, restaurants and bars proliferating in the area. The area also has a large concentration of foreign and expatriate residents, mainly corporate executives and diplomats.

== Attractions ==
- Leeum, Samsung Museum of Art
- Pace Gallery, art gallery
- Thaddaeus Ropac, art galleries
- SOUNDS Hannam, a cultural complex
- Mosu, a 3-Michelin Star restaurant
- Soseoul Hannam, a 1-Michelin Star restaurant

== Education ==
Primary schools:

- Seoul Hannam Elementary School

International schools:

- German School Seoul International
- Yongsan International School of Seoul (YISS)

Previously the French School of Seoul was in Hannam-dong. In 1985 it moved to Seorae Village in Banpo-dong, Seocho District.

== Transportation ==
- Hangangjin Station of
- Hannam Station of

== See also ==
- Administrative divisions of South Korea
