= Memorial Hall for the U.S. Airmen Killed In Action During World War II =

Memorial Hall for U.S. Airmen killed in WWII

Coordinates: 34.8373847°N 127.8940988°E

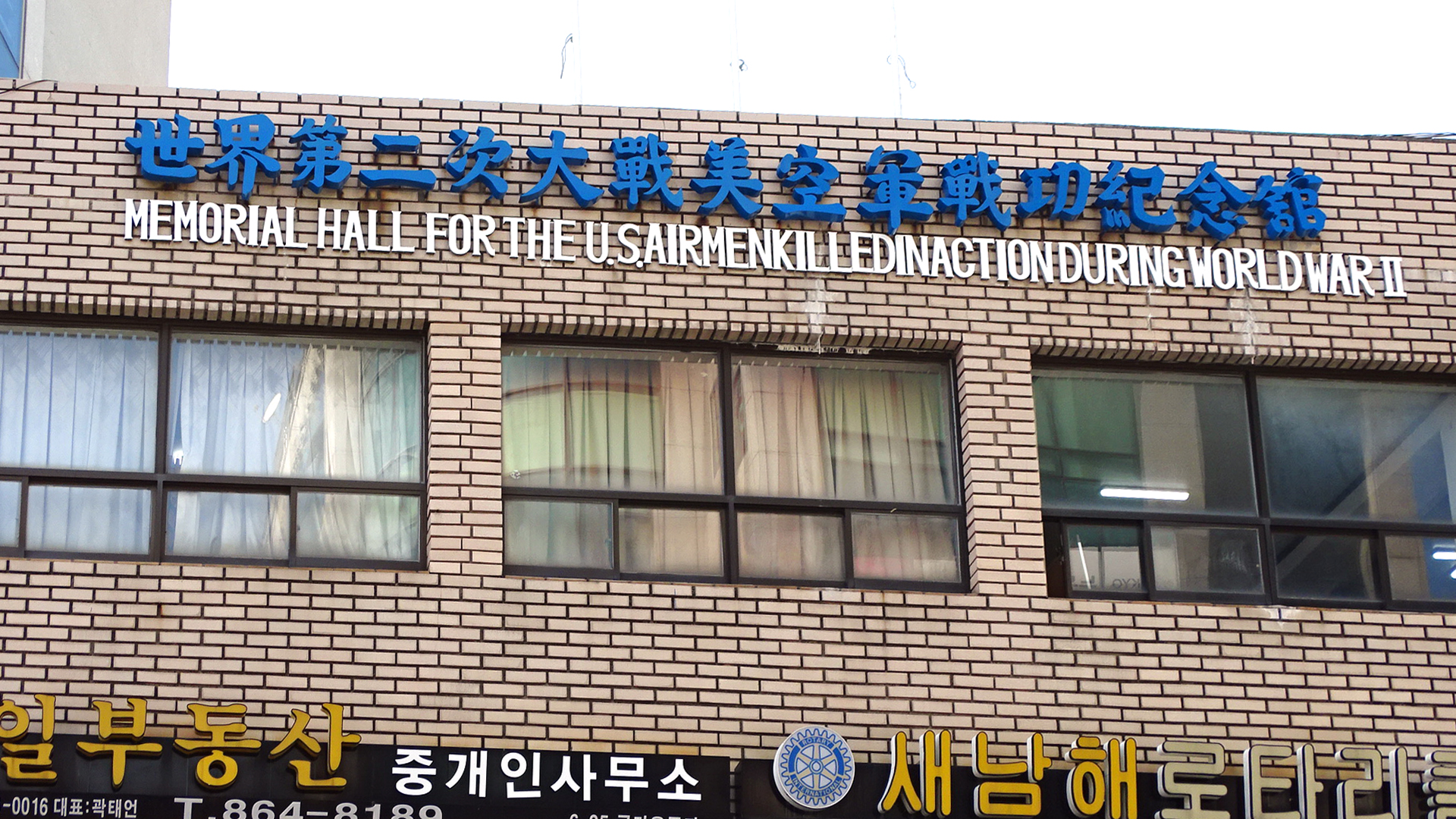
Memorial Hall for the U.S. Airmen Killed In Action During World War II

The Memorial Hall for the U.S. Airmen Killed In Action During World War II in Namhae, Namhae Island, South Korea is dedicated to the 11 U.S. Airmen who were killed when their B-24 Liberator crashed into the mountain peak on Namhae returning from a bombing mission early in the morning of August 8, 1945, after being damaged by Japanese artillery, and to Kim Deok-hyeong, who single-handedly buried the 11 men, used his own funds to build a monument at the crash site, and establish the memorial hall where ceremonies are still held each year for the airmen.

== Bomber Mission ==
On the night August 7, 1945, a week before the end of World War II, two U.S. Army Air Forces B24 Liberators heavy bombers of the 868th Bomber Squadron, took off from their base on Okinawa to search for enemy ships in off the southeastern coast of Korea, towards Busan, and back to Okinawa.

A 200-foot enemy vessel was spotted, and one of the bombers scored a direct hit, and left it dead in the water. The B24, ironically nicknamed “Lucky Lady II", crippled by Japanese ground fire never returned to base. Bomber 131, piloted by Lt. Edward Mills Jr. had crashed on the 3000-foot peak of Mangwun mountain, on the island of Namhae off the southern coast of Korea. American ships and planes searched the southern coast off Korea but found nothing. After a month squadron records recorded “nil reports and nil sightings” with the crew members being listed as missing in action.

== On Namhae Island ==
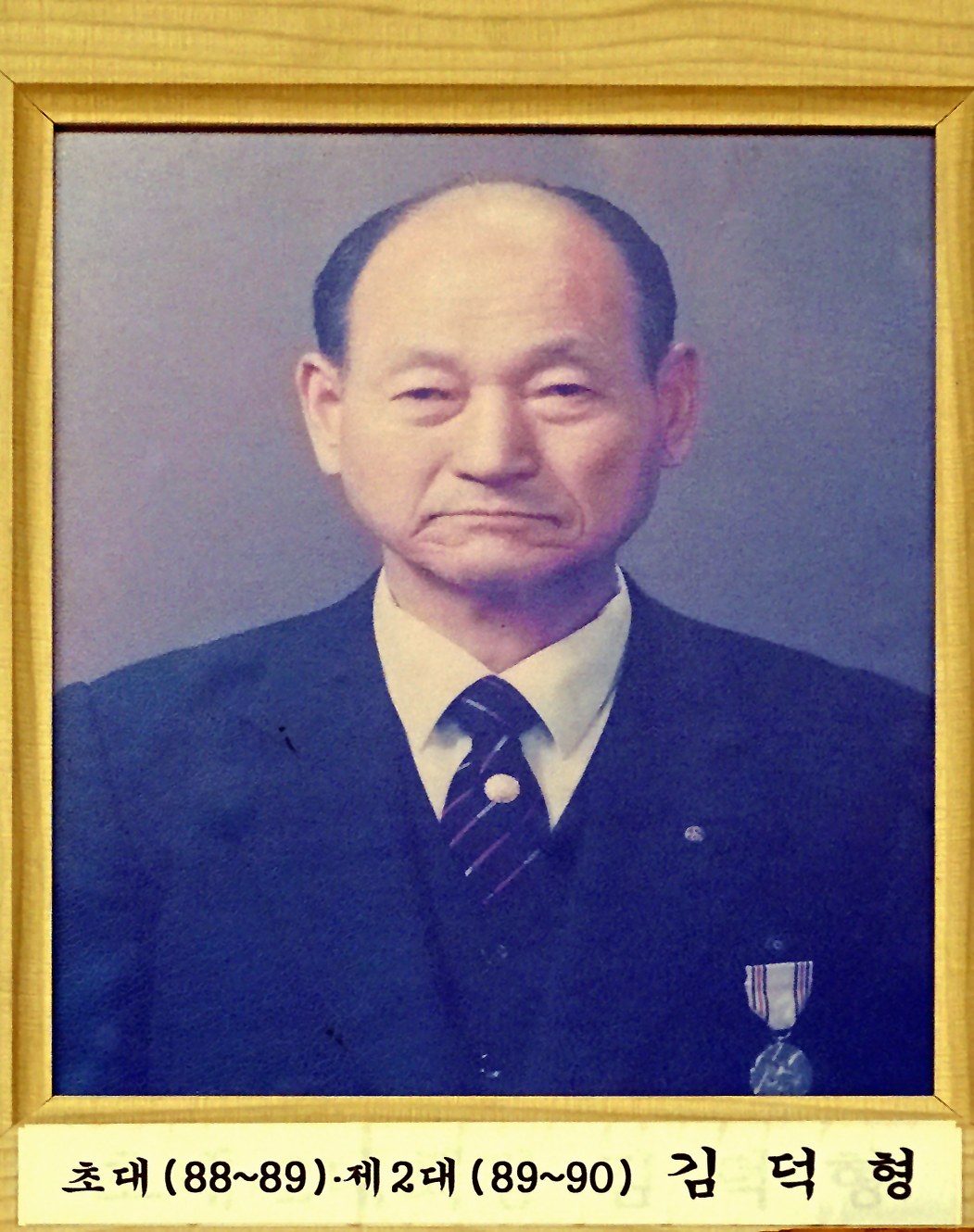
Kim Deok-hyeon

Around 2 AM on August 8, Kim Deok-hyeong was awakened by what he described as "the loudest sound I've ever heard in my life, it was like a bomb explosion.” A huge column of smoke rising from the peak of the mountain appeared.

Kim, Deok-hyeong, a resident of Namhae, joined the Japanese in climbing up the mountain peak and found smoke and flames billowing out of a crashed U.S. Army Air Forces B-24. The Japanese striped the site of usable parts, looted the bodies, and left the bodies of the dead airmen.

Kim said “When I saw the bodies lying on the ground, it reminded me of my brother, who was killed in a plane crash over Burma and whose body was never recovered. I didn't want the same thing to happen to those 11 men." So Kim returned to his village and the next day gathered items needed to bury the airmen, returned to the peak, and as he describes it, “gave them a decent burial so their souls would rest in peace.“

When Japanese authorities discovered that the bodies had been buried, Kim was arrested, interrogated, tortured, and confined. “I never knew there were so many ways to torture a human being," Kim recalled. “My body still bears the scars." When the war ended shortly thereafter on August 15, Kim awoke to an unlocked cell and an abandoned prison.

== Post War ==
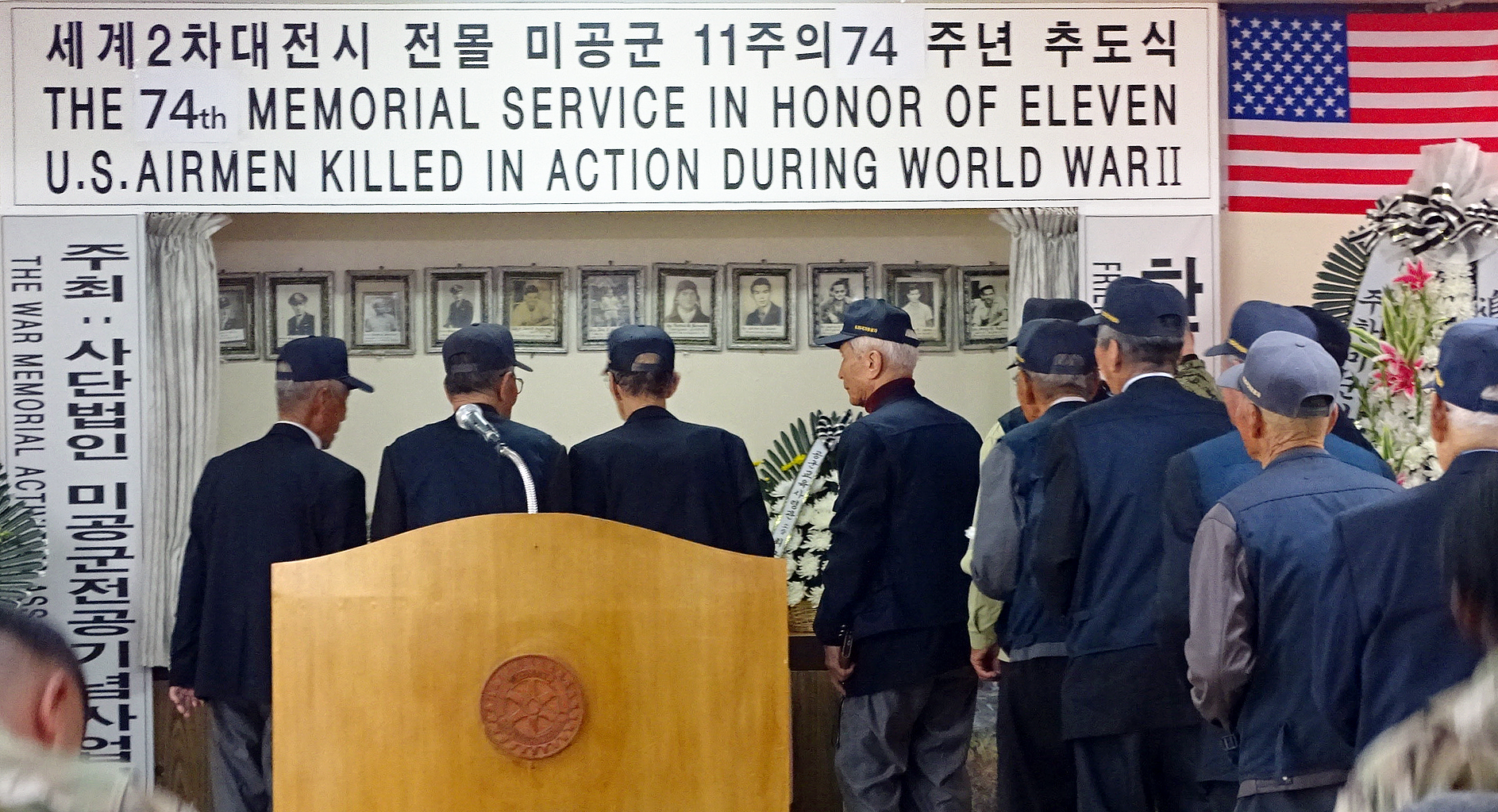
Memorial Ceremony for the U.S. Airmen Killed In Action During World War II

After the war ended and U.S. forces moved onto Korea, they learned what had happened to the missing B24 Lucky Lady II and crew. Now that the island was freed of the Japanese occupation forces, Kim was able to return the dog tags of the deceased airmen to U.S. authorities and help them arrange for the return of the airmen's bodies.

As a tribute to the sacrifice of the 11 American Airmen, Kim using his own funds, erected a 12-foot granite monument at the top Mangwun Mountain in 1956. In 1989 Kim established the Memorial Hall for the U.S. Airmen Killed In Action During World War II in the town of Namhae.

Kim held an annual ceremony from 1945 until his death in 2010 when his oldest son, Kim Jong-ki, took over, continuing to honor the tradition. "My father always told us the reason he continued this memorial. He emphasized the U.S. Soldiers' sacrifices which helped our country to be liberated from Japanese rule and protected our country from North Korea during the Korean War."

== Air Crew ==
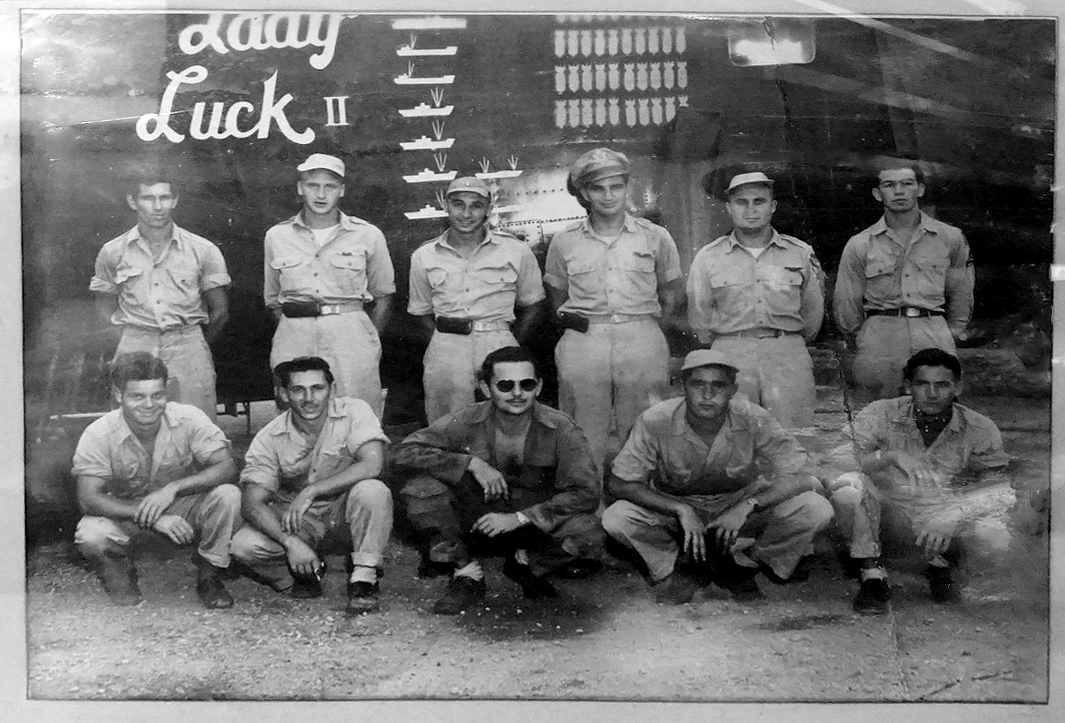
Air Crew of the Lucky Lady II

Pilot - 1st Lt. Edward B. Mills Jr., Carbondale, PA.

Co-pilot - 2nd Lt. Nicholas M. Simonich, Chicopee, MA.

Bombardier - 2nd Lt. Ronald L. Johnson, Red Wing, MN.

Navigator - 2nd Lt. Joseph M. Orenbuch, Boston, MA.

Flight Engineer - Staff Sgt. James E. Murray, Ann Arbor, MI.

Assistant Flight Engineer - Sgt. Warren E. Tittsworth, Tampa, FL.

Radio Operator - Staff Sgt. John F. Regnault Jr., Philadelphia, PA.

Radio Operator - Staff Sgt. Henry C. Ruppert, New York, NY.

Gunner - Staff Sgt. Thomas G. Burnworth, Confluence, PA.

Gunner - Staff Sgt. Walter R. Hoover, Salisbury, NC

Gunner - Sgt. Steven T. Wales, Sacramento, CA.

Through the efforts of Kim Deok-hyeon, the identities and contributions of these airmen have been preserved and recognized. The 11 U.S. airmen who served aboard the Lucky Lady II were the only known American casualties in Korea during World War II

== Significant Fact ==
The 11 U.S. Airmen, crew of the Lucky Lady II, were the only known American casualties in Korea during World War II.
