= Seorae Village =

Ethnic enclave in Seoul, South Korea

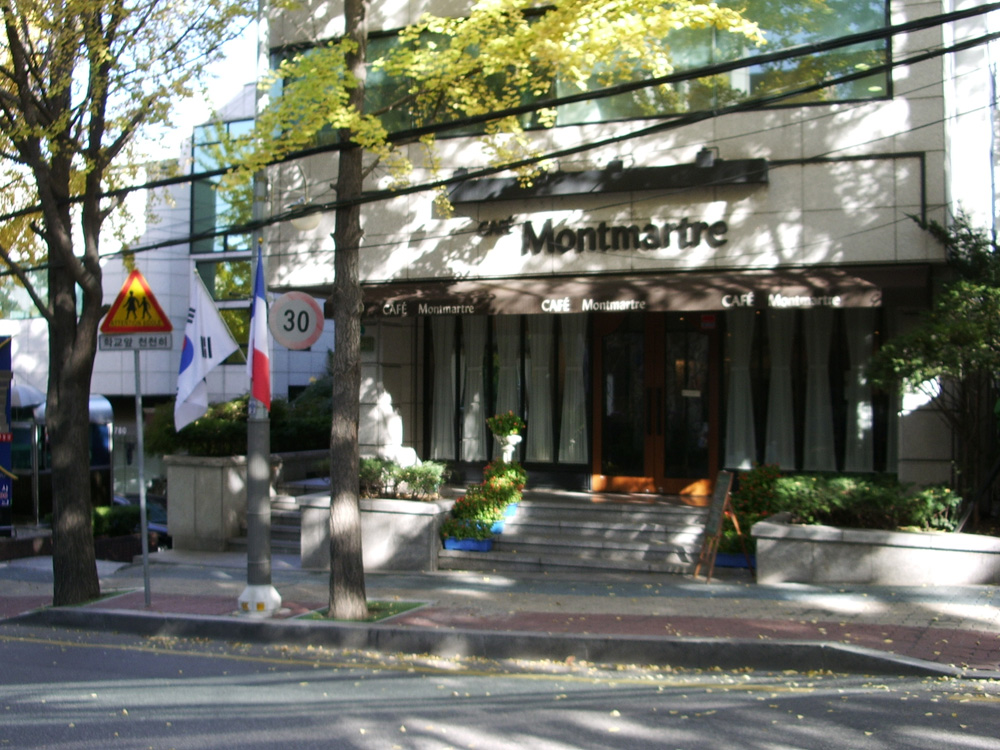
- Seorae Village

- Location within Seoul Location within South Korea
- Coordinates: 37°29′48″N 126°59′53″E
- Country: South Korea
- City: Seoul
- District: Seocho

Korean name
- Hangul: 서래마을
- Hanja: 西來마을
- RR: Seorae maeul
- MR: Sŏrae maŭl

Seorae Village (Korean: 서래마을), sometimes nicknamed "Montmartre", due to its hilltop location, or sometimes "French Village", is a small, affluent French ethnic enclave in Banpo-dong and Bangbae-dong, Seocho District, Seoul, South Korea. It is home to about 560 French people, roughly 40% of the French community in South Korea. Most of them are employees of French corporations doing business in the country. The majority (370) of the French population are children.

The village began to form there in 1985, with the movement of Lycée Français de Séoul to the area. The school, one of the city's French international school, had formerly been located just north of the Han River in Hannam-dong, a large international neighborhood. French people with children followed, as did bakeries and wine shops.

The village is the site of a 20,000 m^{2} park, "Montmartre Park", which is often the site of public events for foreigners. It is near Express Bus Terminal Station on Seoul Subway Line 3.

The area has a large concentration of European-style restaurants and dessert cafes, as well as wineries and cafes stand along its main street.

== History ==
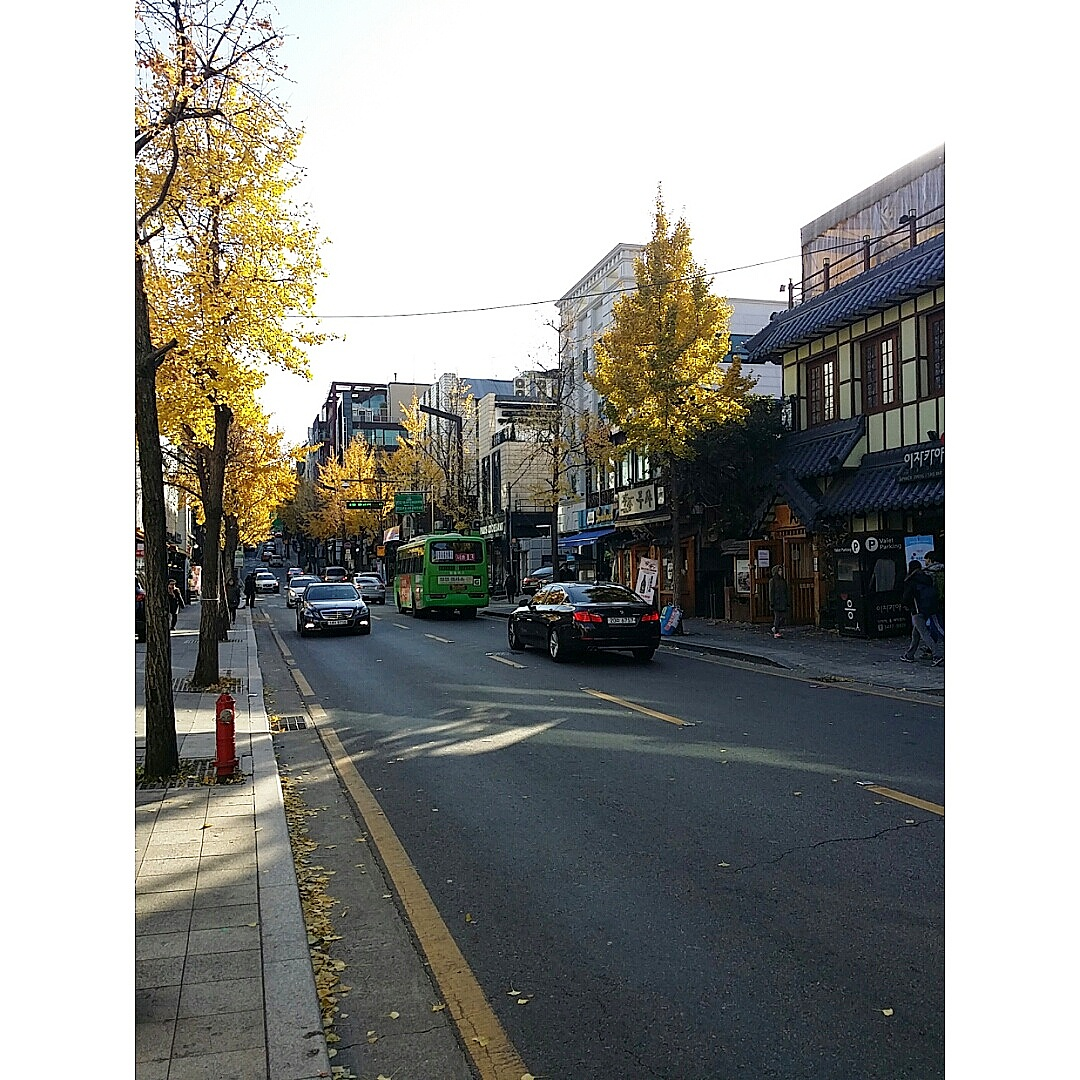
Seorae Village scene

Seorae Village is a district of Seoul, on Banpo 4-dong, Seocho District. It begins at Seorae-ro by Sapyeong-ro, which is located on the southern end of Banpo-daegyo bridge. The name of French Village comes from the fact that about two hundred French people live there. There is not much difference between this village and a common Korean villages because it does not have exotic French style buildings or signboards.

The 300 meter street from Seorae-ro to Bangbae middle school at the end of the hill is paved with three colors blocks (red, white, and blue) to symbolize the national flag of France. Visitors can see signs where French is written with Korean script, such as Attention Ecole (Attention School), Hopital ste-Marie (St. Mary's Hospital) and the signboards of "Le Seine" or "Le Ciel" with the street name of "Montmartre."

The village began to form here in 1985 with the moving of L'Ecole Francaise de Seoul formerly located in Hannam-dong to the area. Next, French people started to gather around the school.

Since the 1990s, as more French corporations including Carrefour, TGV, and Renault have advanced into Korea, Seorae Village became animated gradually; it developed as a tourist attraction for French people in Korea. The Seocho District government announced that they will create access to Seorae Village as a specialized street where French style culture coexists with businesses. Therefore, the French Village is expected to be reborn as the cultural landmark of Seocho District.

== Landmarks ==
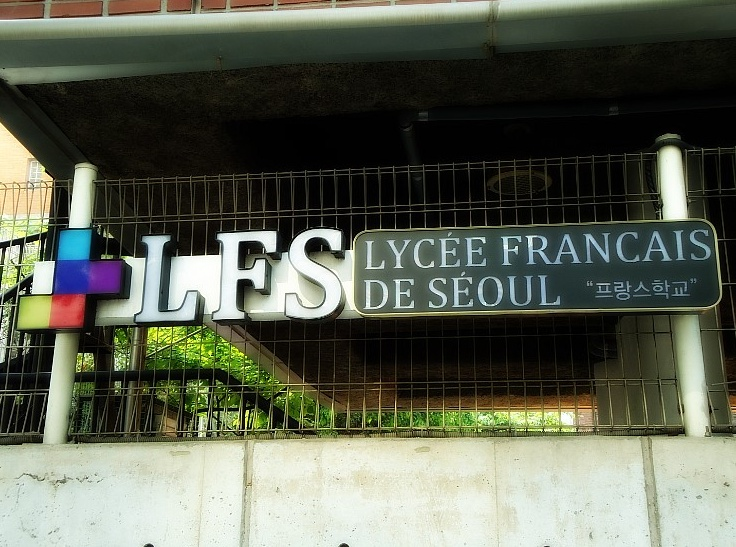
French School of Seoul

There are many attractions to look around in Seorae Village. The French School of Seoul is located in the heart of Seoul's French community in Banpo 4-dong. It is Seoul's only government-established French-language school. Accredited by the French Ministry of Education and regulated by the National Agency for French Education Abroad. The school enrolls about 390 students. From elementary school, students must be competent in French. It has a kindergarten, elementary school and junior and high school.

National Library of Korea is where numerous materials are collected and preserved. It currently holds approximately 4.3 million books and theses, of which roughly 200 thousand are collected annually. Art exhibitions are occasionally held in the exhibition room on the first floor. Surrounded by Seocho Park, the scenery outside is beautiful and the atmosphere is very relaxing.

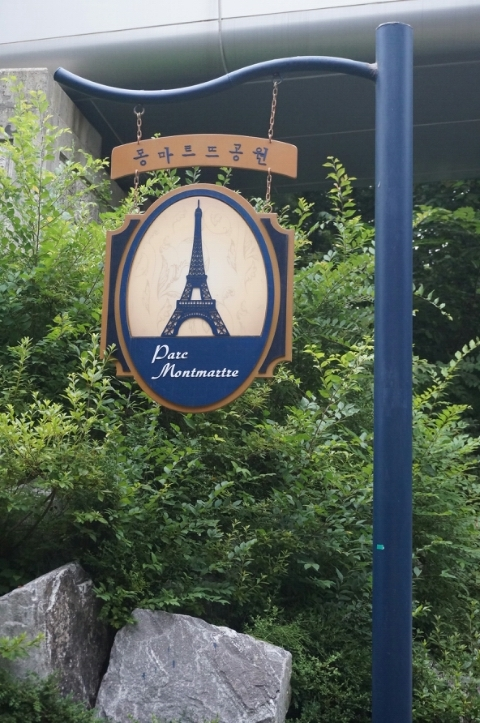
Montmartre Park

Banpo Hangang River Park is among the most popular Hangang park. Located between the Banpo and Hannam bridges on the river's south bank, the park was recently redone, with much of the natural vegetation removed in favor of expansive lawns, walking and bicycle trails, and a large play area for children. An inline skating rink and outdoor stages were also incorporated into the new design. Being a riverside park, jet skis, water taxis and river cruise boats exist as open services on the river.

== Culture ==
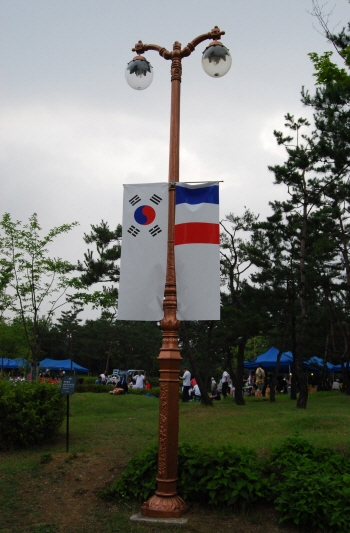
Festival in Seorae Village

Every year, several festivals are held in Seorae Village including a costume parade and a Montmartre music festival.

In spring, students from the French School of Seoul march in a costume parade. The school hosts this event to promote traditional French culture. The carnival is an archaic tradition connected to the agricultural and seasonal cycle of each year, and has the significance of purification as well.

Banpo Seorae Korea/France Music Festival is held every summer. This festival's purpose is to allow people to understand each other's culture and get along. About 2,000 people attend every year, including residents and artists who love music.

== Education ==
- French School of Seoul
- Dulwich College Seoul, a British international school, is about five minutes away by car.

== See also ==
- Véronique Courjault: a French murderer who murdered her babies here
- Petite France: a France-themed theme park in South Korea
- Itaewon: a district associated with foreigners in Seoul
- Central Asia Street: another ethnic enclave in Seoul
- Namhae German Village: a German ethnic enclave in Namhae, South Korea
