= Ferdinand Krien =

Ferdinand Krien was the German consul in Joseon Dynasty Korea from 1887 to 1898.

== In Korea ==
Krien was appointed to his position on 22 May 1887, after having served as an interpreter at the German Legation in Tokyo. In 1888, he became the victim of a malicious rumour, believed to have been spread by the wife of Russian consul Karl Ivanovich Weber, that he held orgies in the German legation; this contributed to his disfavour among foreign missionaries operating in Korea. He was appointed as full consul on 27 May 1889. From 10 July 1889 to 5 April 1891, he took a leave of absence from his position. Around the beginning of his leave, he became the president of the Seoul Club, also known as the German Club, a gentlemen's club headquartered in a building owned by German businessman Carl Andreas Wolter; however, according to American missionary Horace Allen, the club became defunct the following year, possibly due a land dispute in the German community. He set up the Imperial German Language School in Seoul in 1898; it continued operation until 1911. He was succeeded in his consular post by F. Reindorf, and later became the German consul at Kobe.

== See also ==
- List of Ambassadors from Germany to Korea
- Germans in Korea
