= Namhae German Village =

Ethnic enclave in South Korea

- Neighborhood
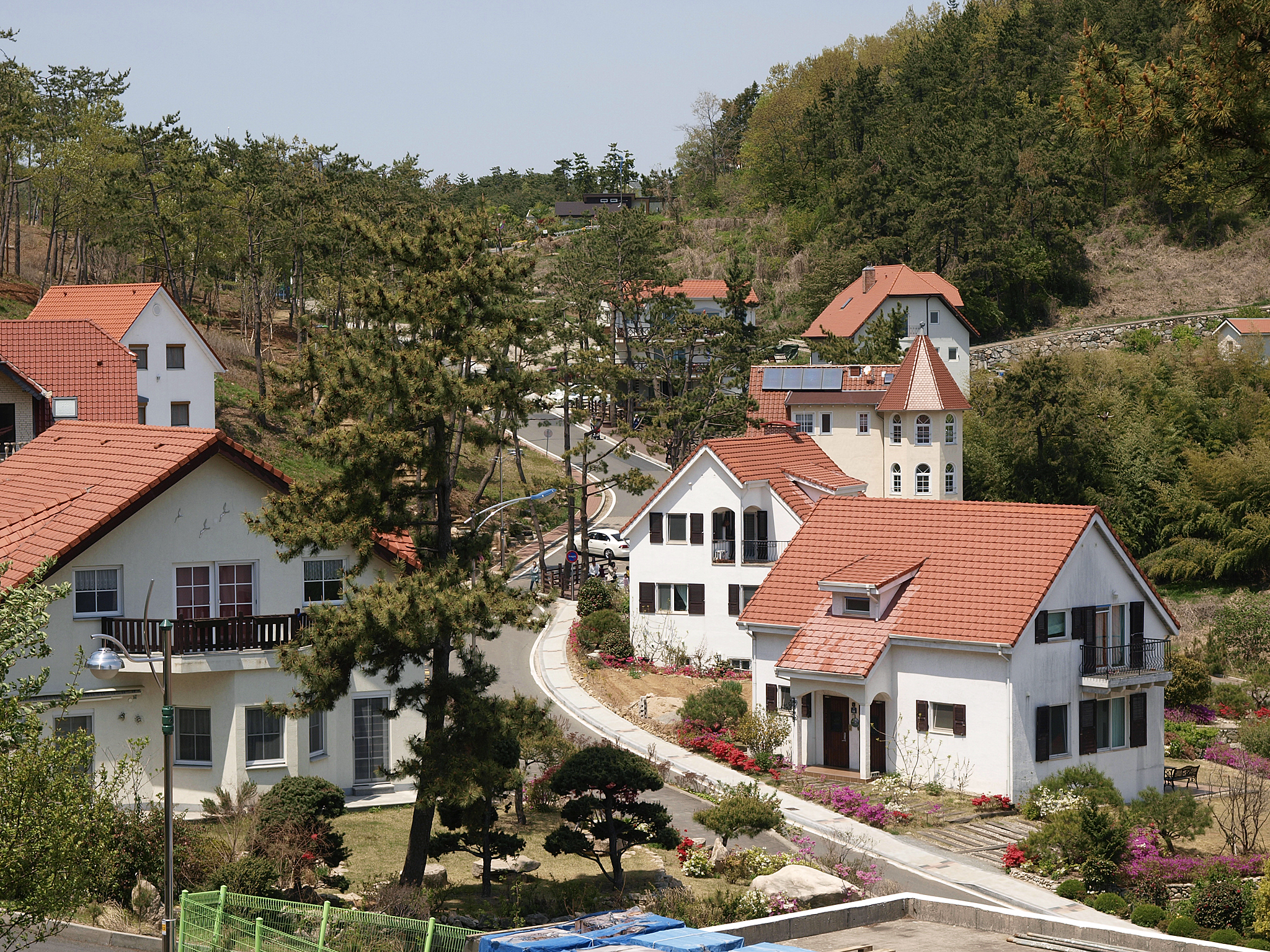
- Village in 2011
- Interactive map of Namhae German Village
- Coordinates: 34°47′56″N 128°02′24″E
- Country: South Korea
- Province: South Gyeongsang Province
- County: Namhae County
- Myeon: Samdong
- Established: 2001
- Website: 남해독일마을.com (in Korean)

Namhae German Village (Korean: 남해 독일마을, German: Deutsches Dorf Namhae) is an ethnic enclave located in Samdong-myeon, Namhae County, South Gyeongsang Province, South Korea. It is populated by both Germans in South Korea and South Koreans who worked in Germany as migrant workers during the 1960s and 1970s.

The village has become a tourist destination, and hosts an Oktoberfest event that draws tens of thousands of people every year.

== Background ==
In the 1960s and 1970s, South Korea sent thousands of its citizens to work as nurses and miners in West Germany. A number of the workers stayed there upon the conclusion of their contract. South Korea's population is now aging, which has also notably affected Namhae County. In 2001, the county constructed this village and offered significant subsidies to any South Korean who lived in Germany for at least 20 years. In total, the project costed around US$7.5 million.

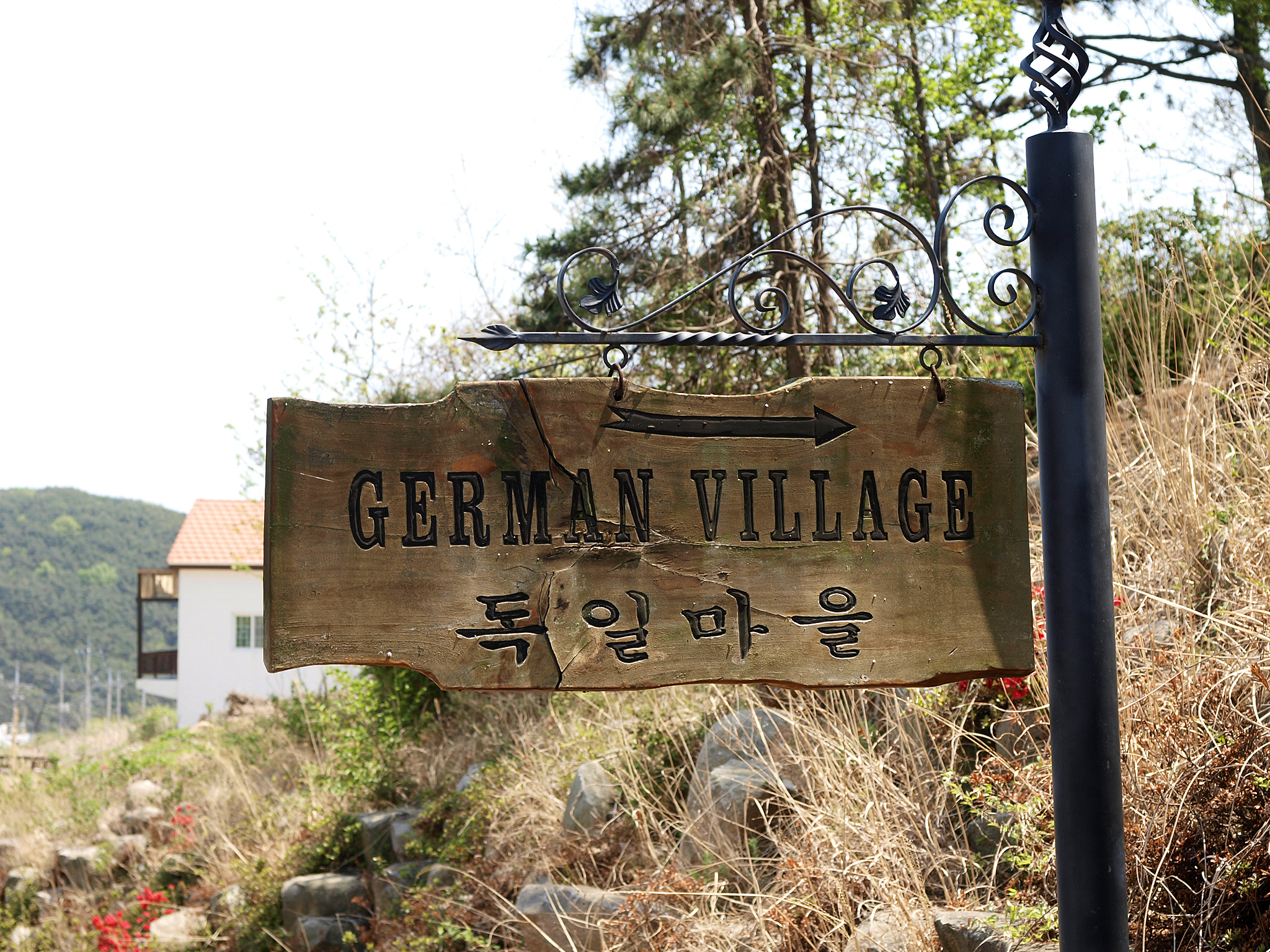
Sign for the village (2011)

Suk Sook-ja, who went to Leichlingen in 1973 and lived in Germany for 30 years, had planned to return to South Korea when her German husband reached retirement age. In 1999, after attending a presentation of Namhae government in Germany, she decided to move there. She became the first returnee to the village. The village began with five houses.

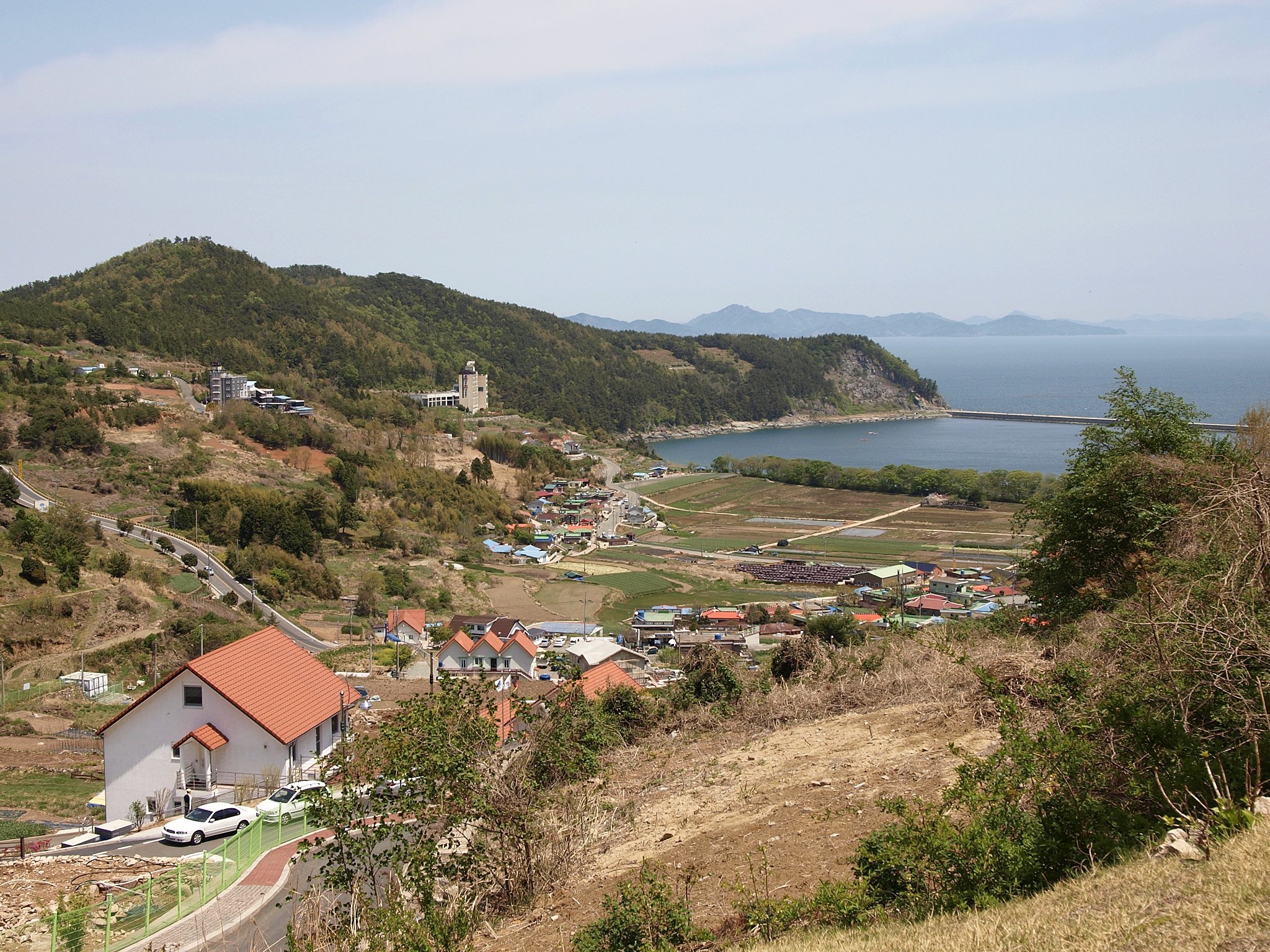
Another view of the village (2011)

Suk ran German language classes from 2006 to 2009, and created the first village Oktoberfest in 2010. The event drew 10,000 visitors. By 2020, the numbers were up to 100,000 visitors a year. The village had 43 houses with 60 residents in 2020. A number of residents do not live in the homes here year round, and use them as vacation homes for when they visit South Korea, while renting out the home for the rest of the year. Also, many of the residents are themselves elderly. This has drawn skepticism that the community will survive in the long term.

In 2014, the village built a Namhae Germany Exhibition Hall for community activities. The village also has an agricultural cooperative and sells German snacks to visitors.

The village offers tours for tourists. There are a number of other tourist attractions nearby, including the Buddhist temple Boriamsa and the scenic terraced farming town Daraengi Village.

One resident reported in 2021 that the South Korean government did not deliver on several promises related to the village. A hospital was promised for the area but never constructed. Water pipes were constructed around 40 cm (16 in) below the ground, meaning that when the weather was warm only hot water would come out of the pipes.

== Gallery ==
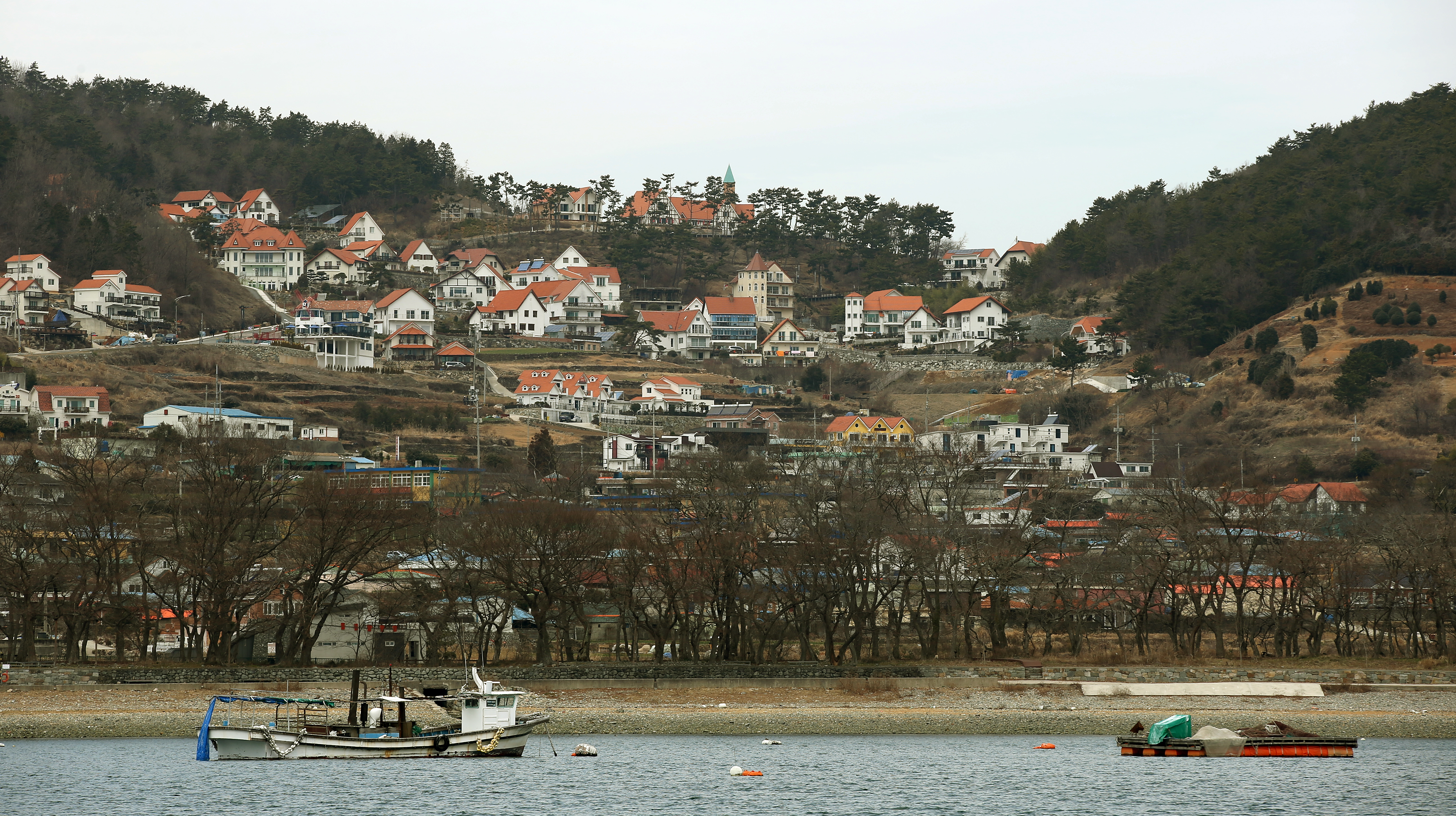
View from the sea (2015)

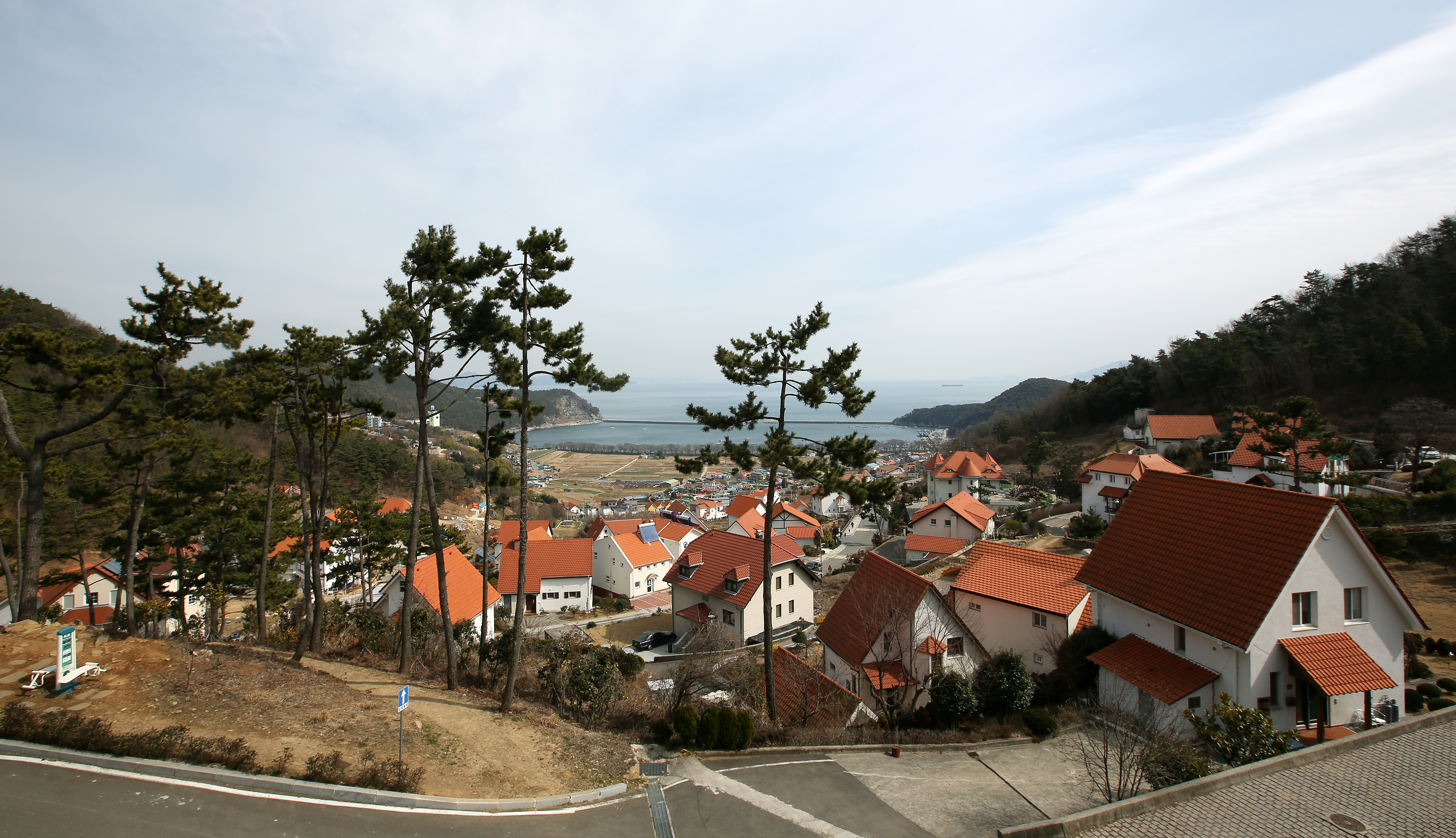
View of the village (2015)

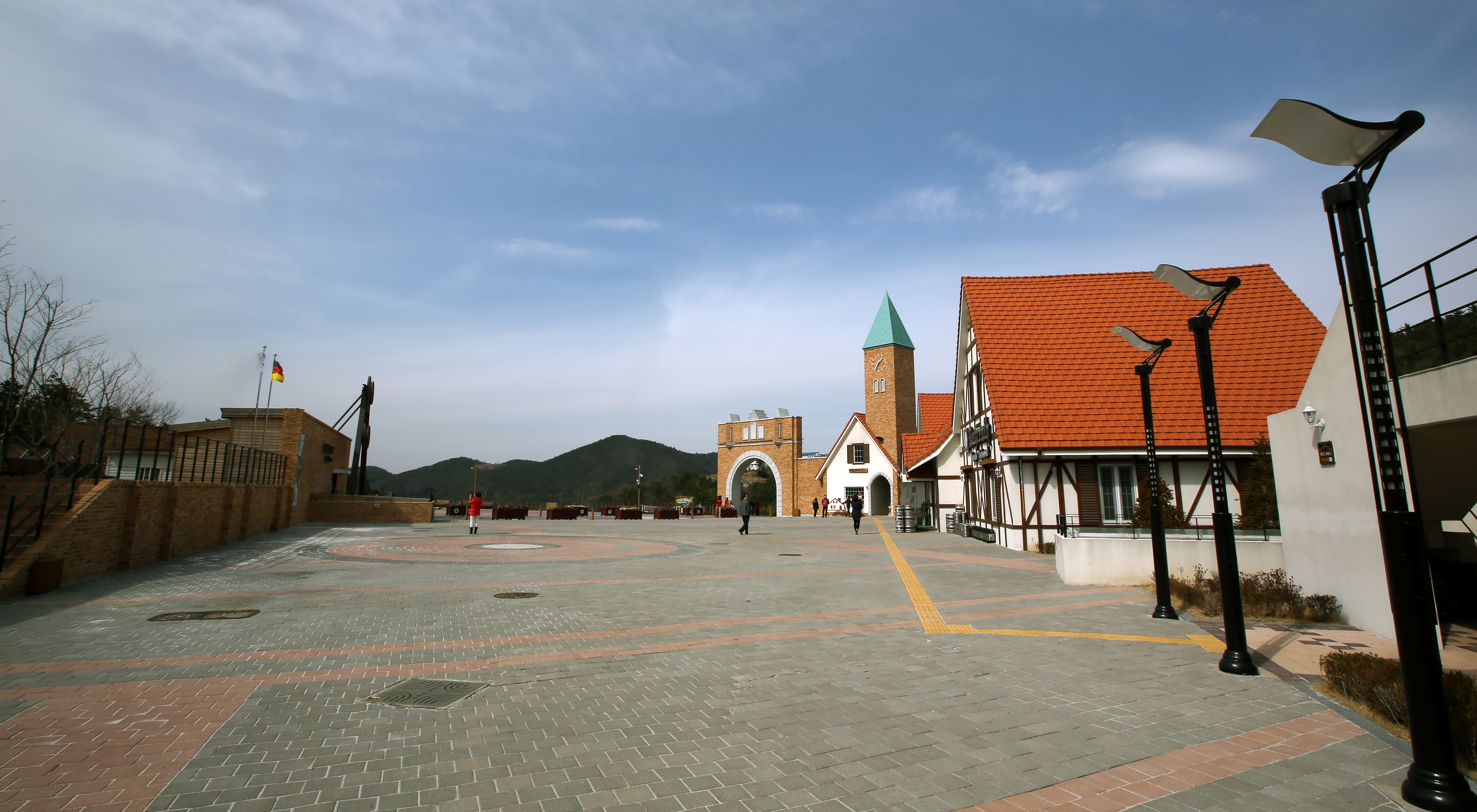
Village square (2015)

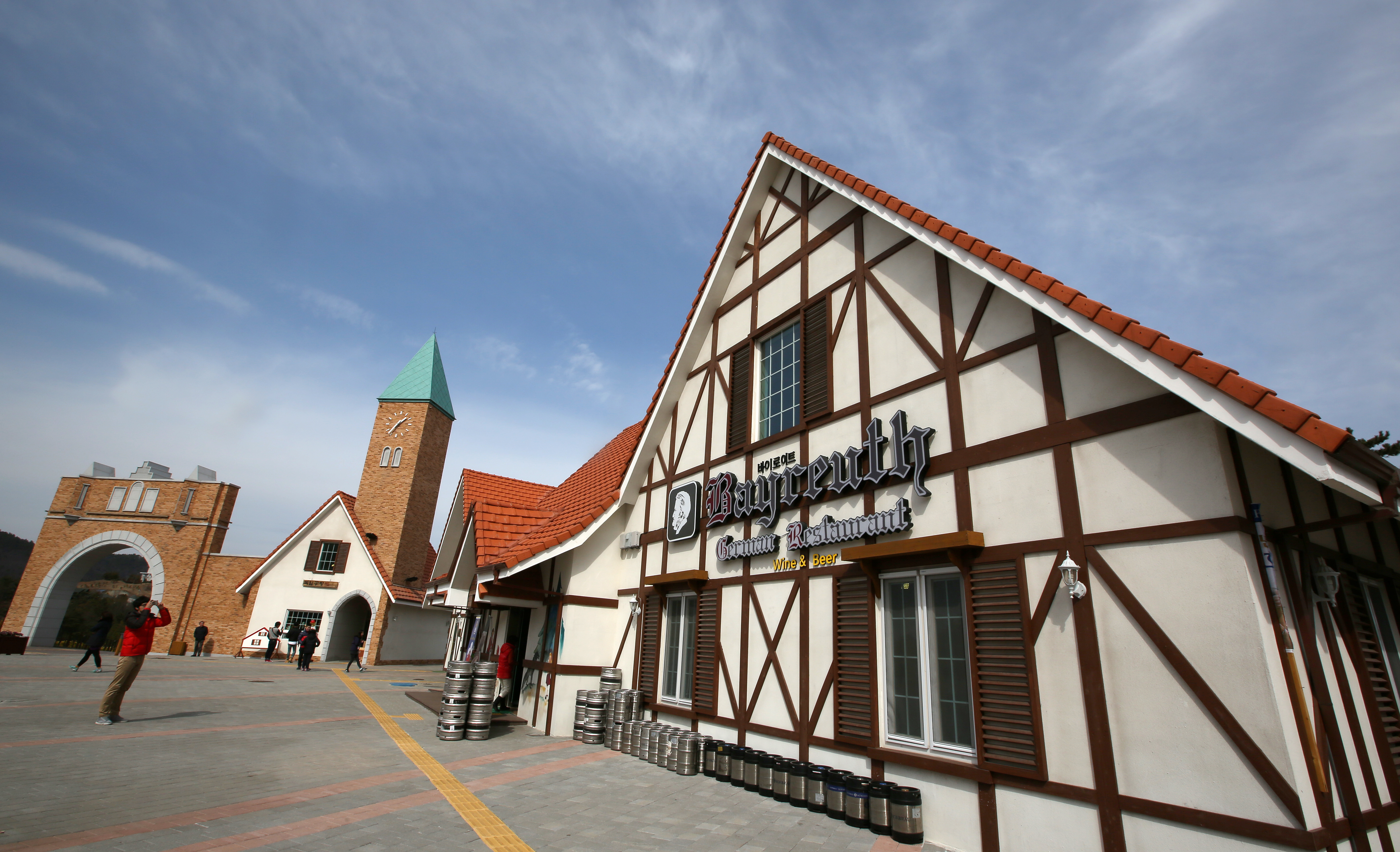
Beer hall (2015)

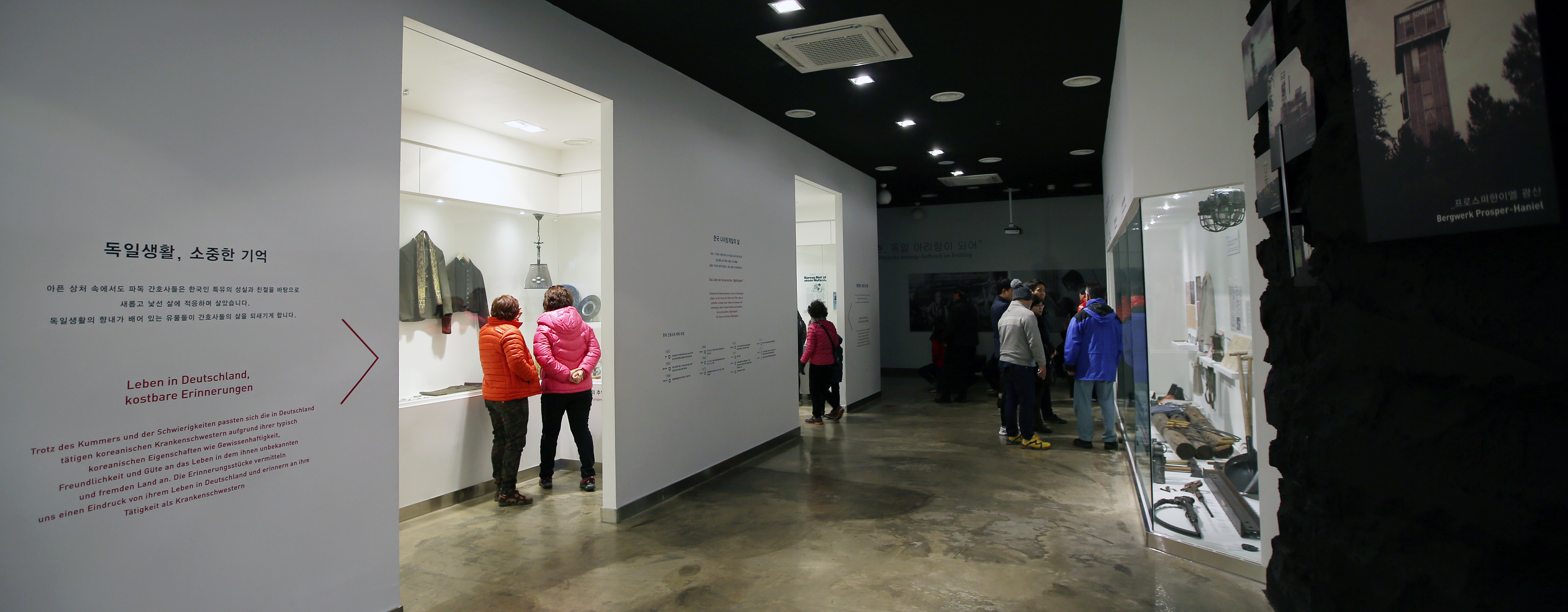
Museum (2015)

== See also ==
- Seorae Village – a French ethnic enclave in Seoul
