= Namhae County =

Coordinates: 34°50′15″N 127°53′32″E

Namhae
- County
- Flag Emblem of Namhae

- Location in South Korea
- Country: South Korea
- Region: Yeongnam
- Administrative divisions: 1 eup, 9 myeon

Area
  - Total: 357 km^{2} (138 sq mi)

Population (September 2024)
  - Total: 40,060
  - Density: 152.4/km^{2} (395/sq mi)
  - Dialect: Gyeongsang

Korean name
- Hangul: 남해군
- Hanja: 南海郡
- RR: Namhae-gun
- MR: Namhae-gun

Namhae County (Korean: 남해군) is a county in South Gyeongsang Province, South Korea.

== Demographics ==
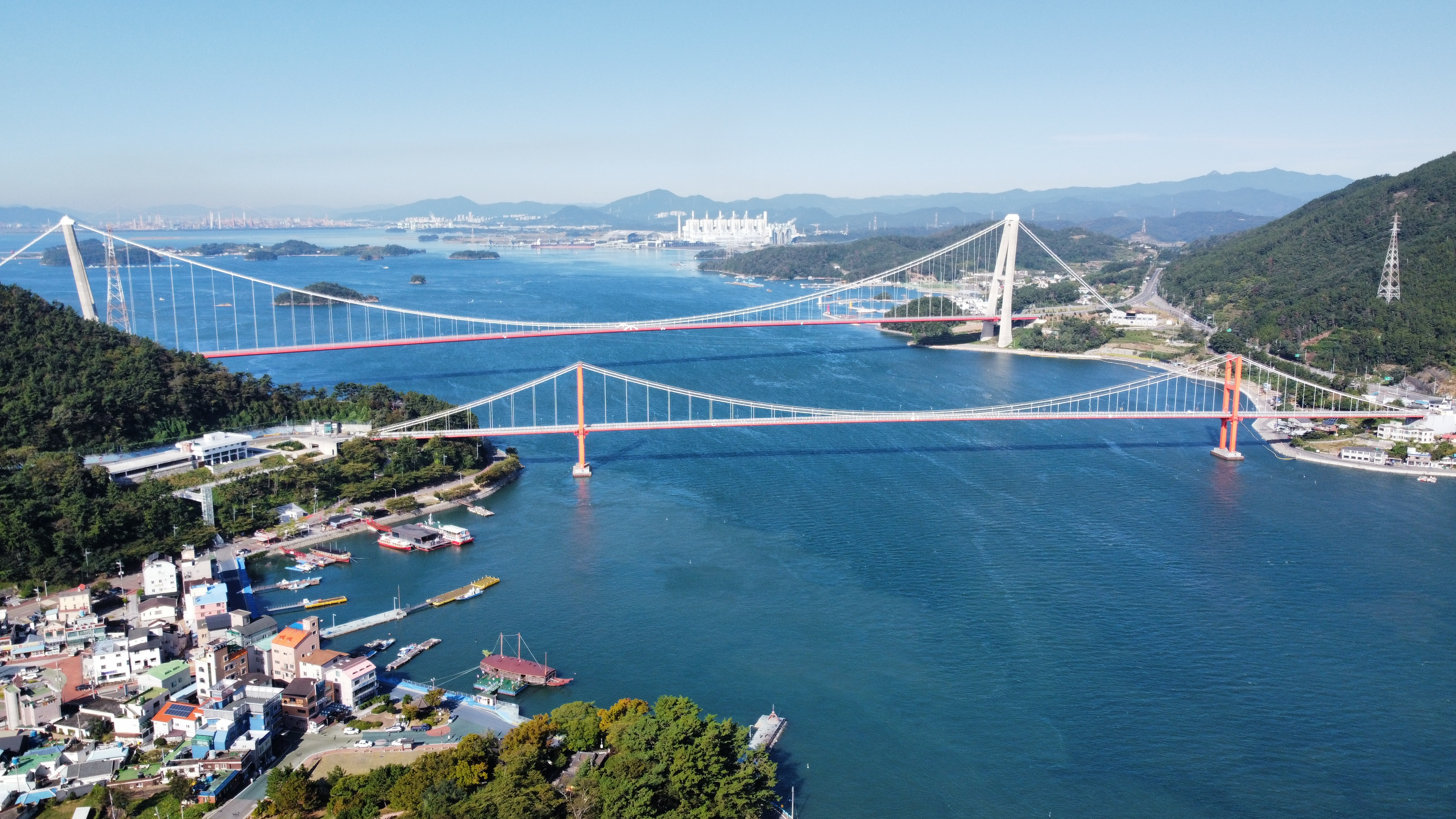
Namhae Bridge

As of 2005, Namhae had a population of 54,392. However, Namhae has witnessed an aging and decreasing population, having had a population of 137,914 in 1964.

== Administrative divisions ==
Namhae-gun is divided into 1 eup and 9 myeon.

- Namhae-eup
- Changseon-myeon
- Gohyeon-myeon
- Idong-myeon
- Mijo-myeon
- Nam-myeon
- Samdong-myeon
- Sangju-myeon
- Seo-myeon
- Seolcheon-myeon

== Namhae in popular culture ==
- The fictional character Jin-Soo Kwon (portrayed by Daniel Dae Kim) on the ABC television show Lost is from Namhae.
- Korean Drama "Couple or Trouble" aka "Fantasy Couple" was set in Namhae. Namhae German Village and Hilton Namhae Golf Spa were featured.
- The 2009 documentary “Home from Home” (Endstation der Sehnsüchte), directed by Cho Sung-hyung, was filmed in the Namhae German Village.
- In the 2017 Korean drama "Because This Is My First Life", female lead Yoon Ji-ho (portrayed by Jung So-min) is from Namhae. The cast reportedly shot some scenes there.
- The fictional character Prosecutor Hwang Si-Mok is transferred to Namhae county at the end of the first season of the drama series Stranger (2017)
- Season 2 of Stranger (2020) kicks off with the fictional character Prosecutor Hwang Si-Mok in the Namhae office.
- In episode 14 of True Beauty, the protagonists come to Namhae-gun without imagining that they would be the last time together.
- In Cities: Skylines, appears in "Land of the Isles" (섬 평지) maps.

== Notable people ==
- Choi San from the K-pop boy group ATEEZ. He was selected as Namhae's Public Relations Ambassador in 2021.
- Yun Sungbin, a skeleton racer and 2018 Winter Olympics gold medallist.

== Geography ==
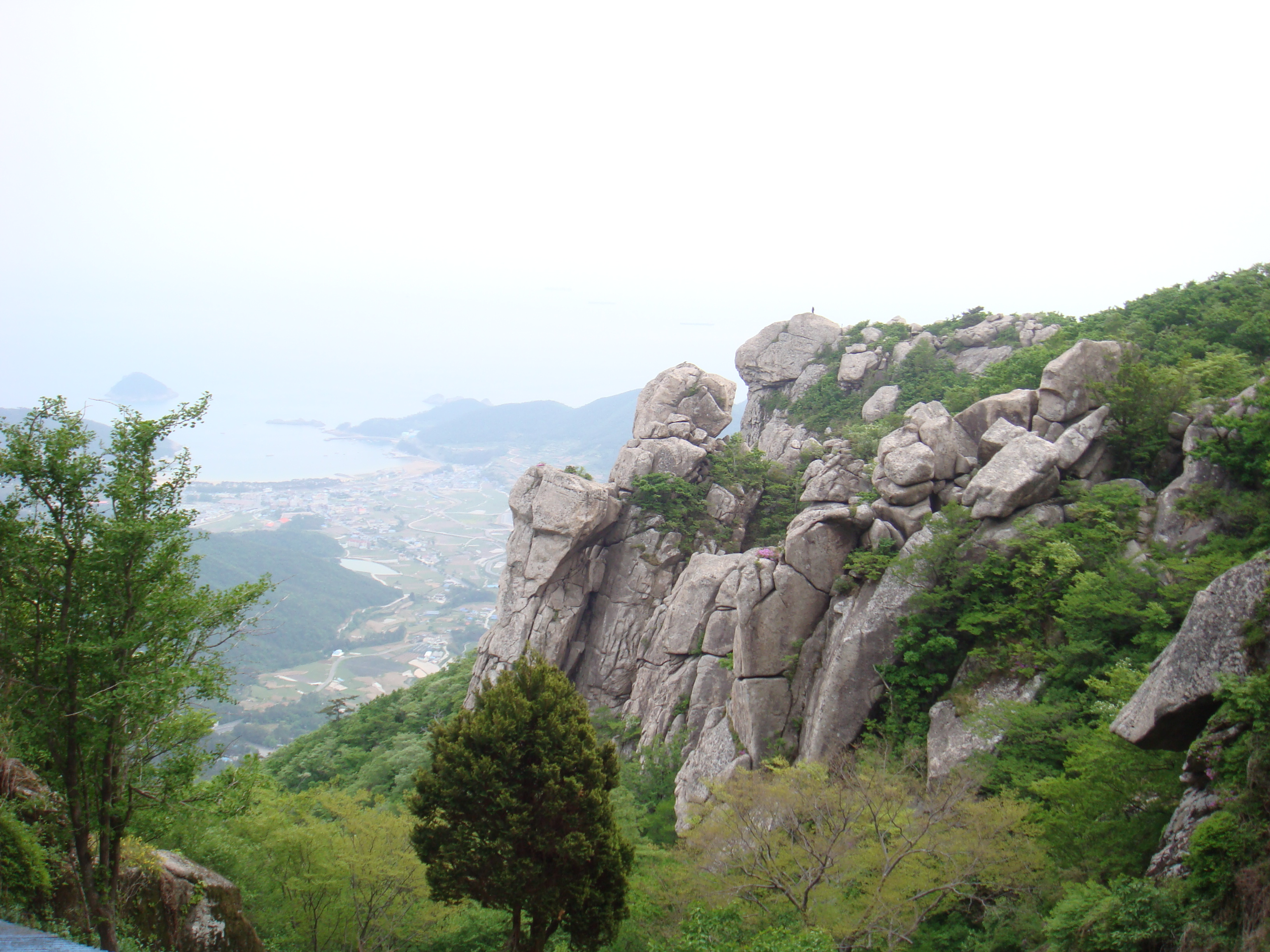
Geumsan (Gold Mountain) of Namhae, Korea

Namhae county covers an area of 357 km^{2}, covering the main islands of Namhae and Changseon, the smaller islands of Jodo, Hodo and Nodo, and 65 other uninhabited islets.

Namhae county also features several peaks; Mangun (786m), Geum (681m), and Won (627m), all of which are located on Namhae island.

=== Climate ===
Climate data for Namhae (1991–2020 normals, extremes 1972–present)
Month	Jan	Feb	Mar	Apr	May	Jun	Jul	Aug	Sep	Oct	Nov	Dec	Year
Record high °C (°F)	18.6 (65.5)	22.1 (71.8)	24.4 (75.9)	28.7 (83.7)	34.1 (93.4)	34.1 (93.4)	37.8 (100.0)	37.7 (99.9)	34.6 (94.3)	29.0 (84.2)	25.1 (77.2)	20.5 (68.9)	37.8 (100.0)
Mean daily maximum °C (°F)	6.9 (44.4)	9.2 (48.6)	13.7 (56.7)	19.3 (66.7)	23.9 (75.0)	26.5 (79.7)	29.2 (84.6)	30.4 (86.7)	26.6 (79.9)	21.9 (71.4)	15.4 (59.7)	9.1 (48.4)	19.3 (66.7)
Daily mean °C (°F)	2.2 (36.0)	4.0 (39.2)	8.2 (46.8)	13.5 (56.3)	18.2 (64.8)	21.6 (70.9)	25.1 (77.2)	26.0 (78.8)	21.9 (71.4)	16.6 (61.9)	10.4 (50.7)	4.3 (39.7)	14.3 (57.7)
Mean daily minimum °C (°F)	−2.0 (28.4)	−0.8 (30.6)	3.2 (37.8)	8.2 (46.8)	13.2 (55.8)	17.8 (64.0)	22.1 (71.8)	22.9 (73.2)	18.4 (65.1)	12.3 (54.1)	5.9 (42.6)	−0.1 (31.8)	10.1 (50.2)
Record low °C (°F)	−12.8 (9.0)	−11.6 (11.1)	−7.7 (18.1)	−2.3 (27.9)	3.4 (38.1)	10.6 (51.1)	15.0 (59.0)	12.5 (54.5)	8.4 (47.1)	1.2 (34.2)	−4.6 (23.7)	−11.6 (11.1)	−12.8 (9.0)
Average precipitation mm (inches)	33.6 (1.32)	65.2 (2.57)	113.1 (4.45)	179.7 (7.07)	196.3 (7.73)	243.8 (9.60)	353.9 (13.93)	319.7 (12.59)	221.9 (8.74)	95.9 (3.78)	62.9 (2.48)	35.2 (1.39)	1,921.2 (75.64)
Average precipitation days (≥ 0.1 mm)	4.8	5.2	7.5	8.8	9.2	10.4	13.6	12.2	8.9	4.9	5.9	4.5	95.9
Average snowy days	2.4	2.2	0.7	0.0	0.0	0.0	0.0	0.0	0.0	0.0	0.4	1.1	6.9
Average relative humidity (%)	56.3	55.2	57.4	59.5	64.3	72.7	79.4	77.7	74.3	65.9	63.4	58.5	65.4
Mean monthly sunshine hours	189.0	188.2	211.9	221.0	234.3	182.9	167.8	184.2	172.7	206.9	182.8	186.7	2,328.4
Percentage possible sunshine	62.4	62.0	57.5	57.7	54.4	44.7	40.1	47.3	49.0	63.4	61.5	64.3	54.4
Source: Korea Meteorological Administration (snow and percent sunshine 1981–2010)

== Sister cities ==
Namhae is twinned with:

- Ganghwa, South Korea
- Geumcheon-gu, South Korea
- Dongdaemun-gu, South Korea
- Gimhae, South Korea
- Busanjin-gu, South Korea
- Hampyeong, South Korea
- Isa, Japan
- Dunhuang, China
- Yiyang, China
- Jinggangshan, China
- Nordfriesland, Germany

== See also ==
- Namhae Waesong
- Memorial Hall for the U.S. Airmen Killed In Action During World War II
