= List of ambassadors of Germany to South Korea =

German Ambassador to the South Korea
- Arms of the Federal Republic of Germany
- Incumbent; Michael Reiffenstuel since October 2020

The list of ambassadors from Germany to South Korea began after the Federal Republic of Germany recognised the Republic of Korea (South Korea) in December 1955. The official title of this diplomat is "Ambassador of the Federal Republic of Germany to the Republic of Korea."

== Historical relations ==
Diplomatic relations between the German Empire and Korea were established in 1883, during the Gründerzeit period of the German Empire and the Joseon Dynasty period of Korean history. However, the Korean Empire lost its right to conduct foreign policy due to the Japan–Korea Treaty of 1905. Germany did not recognise the Provisional Government of the Republic of Korea in exile in Shanghai (the self-asserted successor to the Korean Empire).

The consuls-general and consuls of the German Empire to the Joseon Dynasty and then the Korean Empire were:

- Capt. Zembisch, appointed November 18, 1884
- H. Budler, acting consul-general from August 11, 1885
- T. Kempermann, appointed May 17, 1886
- F. Krien, acting consul-general May 22, 1887; appointed April 27, 1889
- F. Reinsdorf, acting consul from December 5, 1898
- H. Weipert, acting consul from April 1, 1900; appointed September 29, 1900

== List of heads of mission ==
=== Ambassadors of the Federal Republic of Germany to the Republic of Korea ===
- Richard Hertz, 1956–1960
- Karl Bunger, 1960–1964
- Franz Ferring, 1964–1969
- Wilfried Sarrazin, 1969–1975
- Karl Leuteritz, 1975–1980
- Wolfgang Eger, 1980–1985
- Jűrgen Kleiner, 1985–1992
- Dieter Siemes, 1992–1995
- Claus Vollers, 1995–2000
- Hubertus von Morr, 2000–2003
- Michael Geier, 2003–2006
- Norbert Baas, 2006–2009
- Hans-Ulrich Seidt, 2009–2012
- Rolf Mafael, 2012–2016
- Stephen Auer, 2016–2020
- Michael Reiffenstuel, 2020–present

== See also ==
- Germany-Korea Treaty of 1883
- List of diplomatic missions in South Korea
