= German School Seoul International =

International school in Seoul, South Korea

Coordinates: 37°32′14″N 127°00′43″E

- Deutsche Schule Seoul International 서울독일학교
- 123-6 Dokseodang-ro, Hannam-dong (Old-style address: 4-13 Hannam-dong); Yongsan-gu, Seoul 140-210

Information
- Type: Private international school accredited by the German government
- Established: 1976
- Principal: Kerstin Meyer
- Enrollment: Roughly 200
- Website: www.dsseoul.org

The German School Seoul International (German: Deutsche Schule Seoul International, DSSI; Korean: 서울독일학교/서울獨逸學校) is a German international school in Hannam-dong, Yongsan District, Seoul, South Korea.

It was founded in 1976. It serves German expatriate families, other foreigners and Koreans living in the South Korean capital and its surroundings. The school is approved by the Federal Republic of Germany as a private foreign school. It is one of 140 German international schools certified as an "excellent German international school" by the Federal Office of Administration.

== History ==
In August 1976 the Verein Deutsche Schule Seoul was founded as a registered association by German speaking parents and members of the Gesellschaft für Technische Zusammenarbeit. The school was established on August 1 of that year. The parents who campaigned for the school were South Korea-based professionals.

Initially four elementary students were taught in a private apartment in Seoul's UN Village apartment complex. In 1976 eleven students enrolled in the school, leading the school to move to the Goethe-Institute premises. In December 1985 the school relocated to the Itaewon and in 1988 to its current location in Hannam-dong.

In 2012 DSSI was certified as "MINT freundliche Schule" due to its rich curriculum with a focus on science (mathematics, IT, science, engineering).

The German School Seoul International is a German and English-speaking international school.

== Curriculum ==
In close co-operation between kindergarten, elementary school and secondary school, the school provides extensive all-round education similar to "regular" German schools in Germany. Students receive, after completing 9th grade, the "Certificate of Secondary Education" ("Hauptschulabschluss") and after completing 10th grade the "Certificate of Higher Secondary Education" ("Realschulabschluss"). The Certificate of Higher Secondary Education automatically includes the entrance qualification for higher education till 12th grade which leads to the qualification for university admission.

Elementary school students (1st to 4th grade) receive special attention in case certain study areas require special support, particularly in case German is not their first language. During secondary school (5th to 10th grade), the language programme intensifies; in addition to English, the students study French, Korean, or Latin. The natural sciences programme is also emphasised. In the higher secondary school (11th and 12th grade), students are prepared to take the German International Abitur exam.

== Languages ==
Above and beyond the lessons that correspond to the curriculum, intensive promotion in subject-specific areas is taking place at the DSSI with regards to special talents and interests or also in overcoming deficiencies. "German as second language" from the 1st to the 10th grade and the "Pre-school programme according to Penner" in pre-school years assist non-native speaker students to acquire the German language. Students also have the option to learn Korean as well as another foreign language. The DSSI also co-operates with both an English- and a French-speaking school in Seoul to facilitate students' progress in the obligatory language lessons.

Exposure to the English language begins with English lessons in 1st grade and is furthered through bilingual instruction in individual subjects starting in grade 5. The "English as a second language" programme was introduced in order to fulfill the heightened requirements of bilingual instruction.

== Demographics ==
As of 2005 there were almost 100 German students attending DSSI.

== Degrees ==
Students obtain, as the highest degree, the German International Abitur (DIAP) after graduating from 12th grade. Students receive the Intermediate Secondary School Certificate after 9th grade and the Certificate of General Secondary Education after 10th grade.

== See also ==
- Education in Germany
