= Norbert Vollertsen =

German activist (born 1958)

Norbert Vollertsen (born 10 February 1958 in Düsseldorf) is a German doctor and human rights activist. He is best known for his travels to North Korea in the late 1990s and early 2000s. During these travels, he documented the ongoing famine by secretly photographing starving Korean children. In 2013, Vollertsen was condemned to three years in prison by a German court after being charged with child sexual abuse.

== Life and career ==
Vollertsen was in North Korea from 1999 to 2001, during the Arduous March, to practice medicine with the Cap Anamur Committee, a non-governmental cooperation organization. The North Korean agency KCNA reported in August 1999 that Vollertsen and Francois Large, another aid worker, donated their skin to Pak Jong Thae, a tractor factory worker in Haeju, South Hwanghae, who had suffered burns on over three-quarters of his body and underwent three skin grafting operations. In recognition of his contribution, Vollertsen received the official Democratic People's Republic of Korea's Friendship Medal for his humanitarian assistance later that same month, in a ceremony which was attended by Supreme People's Assembly vice-president Yang Hyong Sop. He was also given a pass that allowed him to travel through the country freely, which was very unusual for a foreigner.

As he traveled in his capacity as an emergency physician, visiting the countryside and tending to the illnesses and injuries which common North Koreans were suffering from, he struggled with a nearly non-existent healthcare system, abject poverty and growing proof of a network of political prisons in North Korea that enforced the flow of wealth from the citizenry to the Pyongyang-based military and the Workers' Party of Korea which was then headed by Kim Jong Il. Using smuggled cameras, he obtained photos and films that demonstrated the catastrophic human rights situation. In particular, he photographed starving North Korean children. Speaking to press, Vollertsen would later claim that mass starvation was used as a "weapon" and a tool of political control. He began to collect evidence of large-scale starvation, which he passed to a visiting United States Congressman, an act for which he was put under surveillance. Despite this, Vollertsen continued to speak out against the North Korean government, which soon lost its patience with him and forced him to leave North Korea in January 2001. Soon after returning home, he gave an interview about his experiences in North Korea, which the North Korean government denounced.

The North Korean government has portrayed Vollertsen as a dishonest media manipulator who is suffering from mental instability. His wife, reacting to his decision to stay in South Korea as an anti-Kim activist, divorced him and she is raising their children with a partner. In 2003, Vollertsen stated, "My wife blamed me for not taking care of my family. She said my vision, my goals, my projects, were worth much more to me. And afterwards, I realised she was right. I do not want to sacrifice my family. But I know my wife and her partner are taking care of my children, and that they are safe and healthy. But the North Korean children are not".

In September 2006, Vollertsen claimed that while he was in Seoul and before he made a speech on North Korea, he had been attacked by a gang and he also claimed that he had been run over by a taxi cab.

He has written the book Inside North Korea: Diary of a Mad Place, published in 2004. It was earlier translated into Japanese by Midori Segi and published in Japan in 2001.

=== Sexual abuse indictment ===
In June 2013, Vollertsen was put on trial in Germany for the repeated sexual abuse of a 13-year-old. He was sentenced to three years in jail.

== Works ==
- Vollertsen, Norbert (2004). Inside North Korea: Diary of a Mad Place. San Francisco: Encounter Books. ISBN 978-1-893554-87-0.

== See also ==
- North Korea
- History of North Korea
- Human rights in North Korea
- Prisons in North Korea
