= French School of Seoul =

French school in Seoul, South Korea

- French: Lycée français de Séoul; Korean: 서울프랑스학교
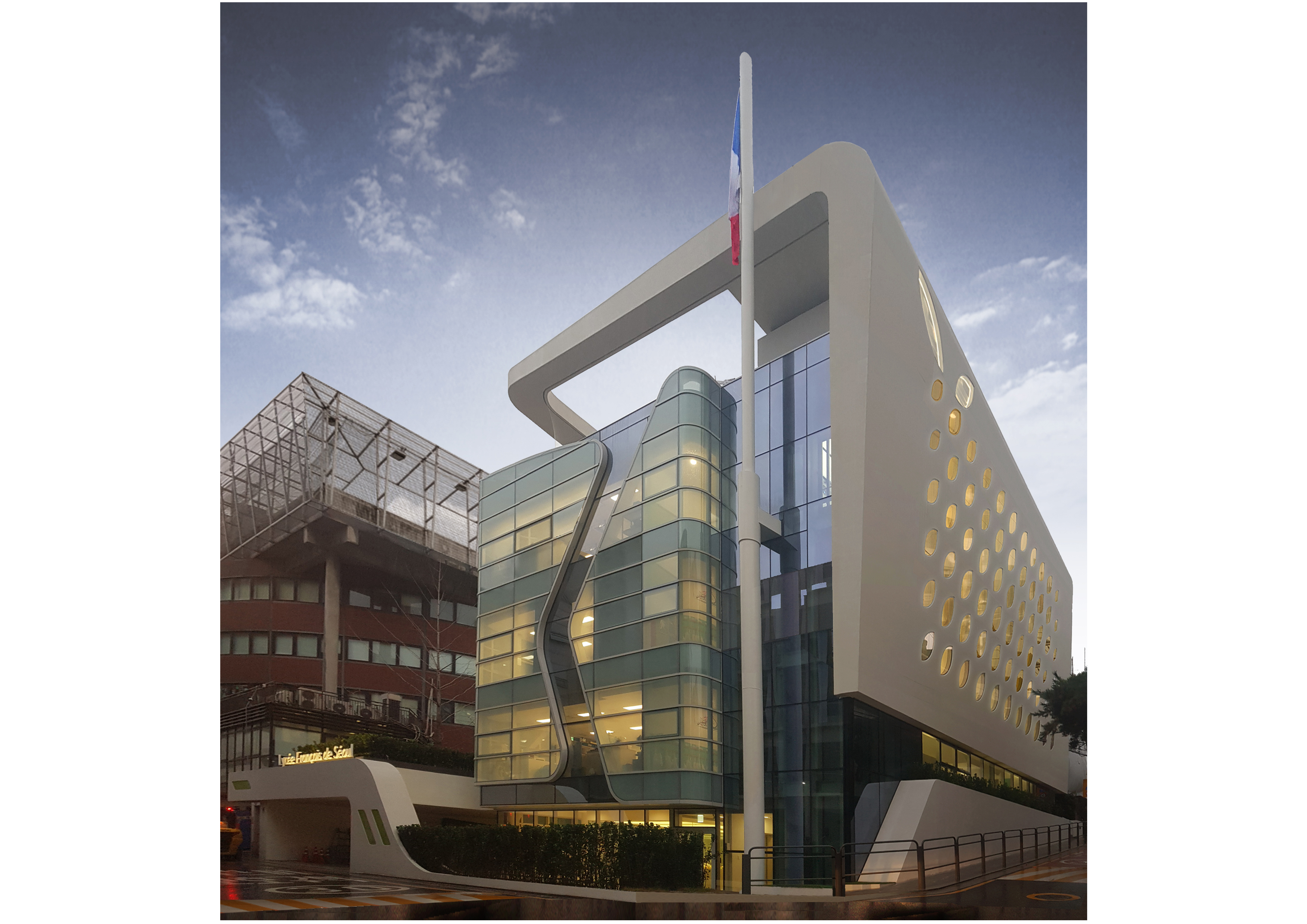

Location
- Seoul; South Korea
- Coordinates: 37.4957°N 126.9976°E

Information
- Type: AEFE agreement, Ministry of National Education homologation
- Established: 1974 (French School of Seoul), 2002 (current form)
- Headmaster: Cédric Toiron
- Grades: Kindergarten, Elementary school, Middle School and High School
- Language: French, English, Korean, German and Spanish.
- Website: https://lfseoul.org/fr/

The French School of Seoul (French: Lycée français de Séoul, LFS, Korean: 서울프랑스학교) is a French international school in Seorae Village, a community in Banpo-dong, Seocho District, Seoul, South Korea. The LFS welcomes nearly 560 students, from the "Petite Section" of kindergarten to the "Terminale" class of high school. It is part of the network of the Agence pour l'enseignement français à l'étranger (AEFE).

The Lycée Français de Séoul (LFS) is registered by Korean regulations as "Foreign School" and accepts all students regardless of their nationality. Registration is open throughout the year.

The LFS staff consists of about 85 people.

== Campus ==
The LFS has two rooftops, one for the middle and high school students in the shape of a handball/basketball field dedicated to sport class, and another one for primary school students. It also has three outdoor playgrounds, one for the kindergarten students and two shared between the elementary, middle school and high school students.

Finally, the school has a gymnasium with a cinema screen that it uses for students performance and shows and the cafeteria is shared with all the students.

== History ==
Founded in 1974 in Itaewon-dong, successively settled in several individual houses, the École française de Séoul is registered at the S.M.O.E. – Seoul Metropolitan Office of Education (Centre d'éducation de Séoul) since 2001.

It was built by the Parents' Association (A.P.E.) on the current site of Banpo 4-dong in Seocho-gu in 1981, an extension currently housing elementary classes was built in 1986 and a final building was constructed in 1998, after the purchase of adjacent land by A.P.E.

This building now houses the administrative offices as well as the secondary school classrooms (for middle and high school) and the CDI (the secondary school library). On the roof of this building was built a sports field.

The École Française de Séoul became the Lycée Français de Séoul during the general assembly on September 27, 2012.

In terms of extension, it is the project of Seorae-maeul and acquisition of the semi-detached plot of Deoksan, supported by the A.P.E., which was retained in 2016 by a very large majority. It allows the establishment to maintain its location in Seorae-maeul (dating from 1981), considered as the "French village" of Seoul.

In 2018, the project of a 2nd extension and renovation is launched. April 2017 was marked by the start of construction, with a "commencement of construction ceremony" until August 2018. At the same time, from July 2018 to January 2019, major renovations of older buildings took place.

An "inauguration ceremony" was held on 19 April 2019; the ceremony celebrated the completion of these projects.

In 2024, the school celebrates its 50th anniversary and continues various renovations. The Kaewhasan rooftop has been renovated and the school is unveiling a new climbing wall.

== School's mission ==
The main objectives of the French high school in Seoul, like those of the other institutions of the AEFE network, are:

- to ensure the continuity of the French public education service for the benefit of French families living abroad;
- to contribute, through the schooling of foreign students, to the promotion of the French language and culture;
- to participate in educational cooperation by maintaining privileged relations with the culture, language and institutions of the host countries.

== Community ==
The French school of Seoul hosts about twenty different nationalities representing a total of 559 students in March 2025. Enrolment was 457 in March 2015 and 338 students in October 2005. The school provides direct education from the "Petite section" class to the "Terminale" class. The school's breakdown by nationality for the 2024-2025 school year is about 60% French, 20% Koreans and 20% third nationalities.

== Access ==
The nearest metro station to the school is Express Bus Terminal or Sinbanpo. Bus line 13 (green buses) serves a stop just in front of the LFS from Express Bus Terminal. There is currently only one school pick-up line from the embassy to the high school via Itaewon, Yongsan and Hannam Dong.
