= Germany–Korea Treaty of 1883 =

1883 treaty between Germany and Korea

The Germany–Korea Treaty of 1883 was negotiated between representatives of Germany and Korea.

== Background ==
In 1876, Korea established a trade treaty with Japan after Japanese ships approached Ganghwado and threatened to fire on the Korean capital city. Treaty negotiations with several Western countries were made possible by the completion of this initial Japanese overture.

In 1882, the Americans concluded a treaty and established diplomatic relations, which served as a template for subsequent negotiations with other Western powers.

== Treaty provisions ==
The Germans and Koreans negotiated and approved a multi-article treaty with provisions similar to other Western nations.

Ministers from Germany to Korea were appointed in accordance with this treaty; and these diplomats were: Capt. Zembisch, appointed November 18, 1884; T. Kempermann, appointed May 17, 1886; H. Weipert, appointed September 29, 1900.

The treaty remained in effect even after the protectorate was established in 1905.

== See also ==
- List of Ambassadors from Germany to South Korea
- Unequal treaties
