= Germany–South Korea relations =

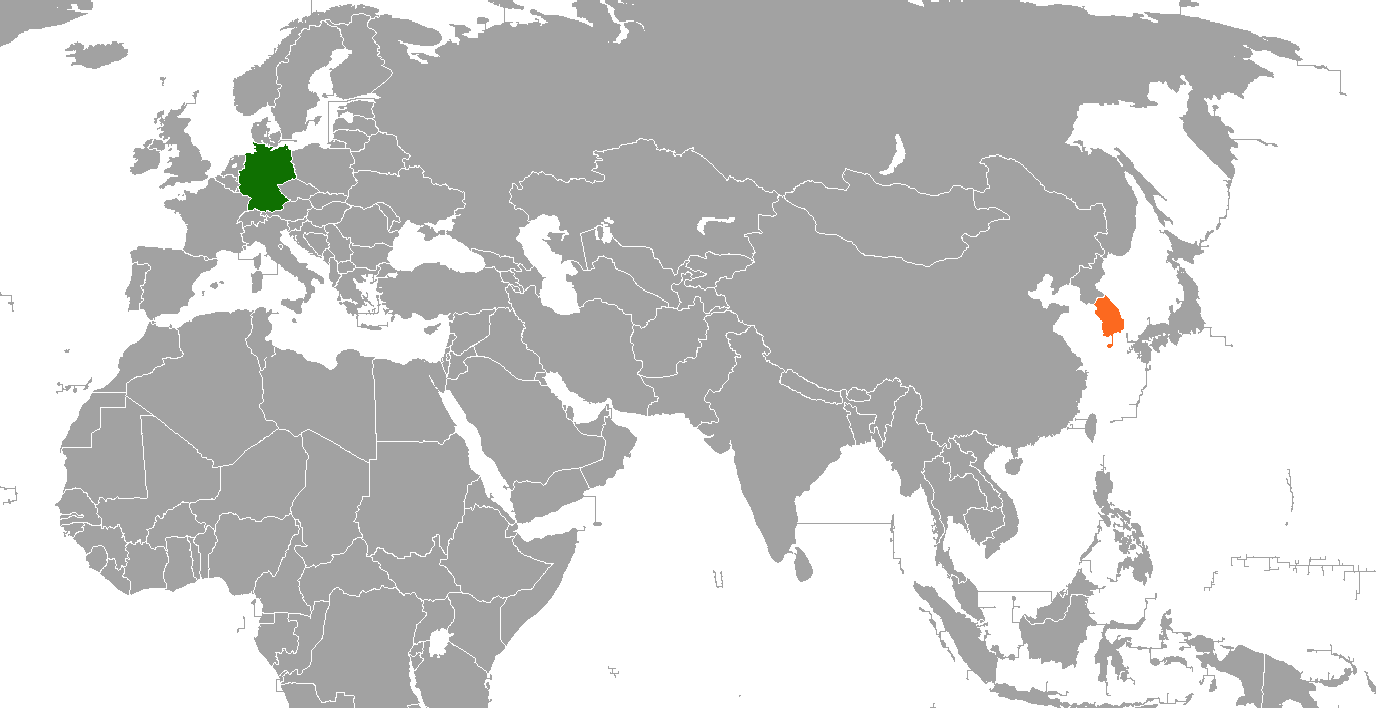

- Germany: South Korea

Diplomatic mission
- Embassy of Germany, Seoul: Embassy of South Korea, Berlin

Envoy
- Ambassador Georg Wilfried Schmidt: Ambassador Lim Sang-beom

Germany–South Korea relations (German: Deutsch-Südkorea Beziehungen; Korean: 한독관계) were established in the 1950s and play a vital role in the foreign policy of both countries today.

Today, Germany and South Korea are the world's third- and 12th-largest economies, respectively, and are bonded through strong economic, cultural, and political cooperation. Germany has an embassy in Seoul. South Korea has an embassy in Berlin, an embassy office in Bonn and a consulates-general in Frankfurt and Hamburg.

== Historical background ==
The Korean state of Joseon first established diplomatic relations with the German Empire under the Germany–Korea Treaty of 1883 which remained in effect even after in 1905.

In 1955, West Germany officially recognized South Korea as a sovereign state.

== Present situation ==
Since the German reunification of 1990, much effort has been undertaken by both countries to improve diplomatic relations with each other. In the mid-2000s, the Germany–Korea Treaty of 1883 was renewed by both countries and was officially put into effect on December 19, 2008, as a form of commemoration of the 125th anniversary of the original treaty.

On December 20, 2012, the German chancellor Angela Merkel congratulated Park Geun-hye on her appointment as President of South Korea and invited her to make an official visit to Germany. Both politicians stressed the importance of furthering and strengthening the "traditionally very good ties" between the two countries. Merkel has also vowed to assist in the potential challenges of any future Korean reunification, since Germany underwent a reunification itself.

On March 7, 2016, the Ministry of National Defense of South Korea and Germany signed a Memorandum of Understanding with the German Ministry of National Defense to discuss ways to strengthen military cooperation, including regularization of military cooperation meetings between the two countries. According to the memorandum of understanding, the two countries agreed to hold regular military cooperation meetings and deepen and develop friendly cooperation relations and share their experience in military innovation.

In 2023, Germany and South Korea marked 140 years of diplomatic relations. As of 2022, the volume of trade between the two countries was about $33.6 billion, an increase of 34% from 2011.

"There has been a tremendously growing economic interconnection over the past decades, promoted in particular by the EU-Korea Free Trade Agreement.... German investments in South Korea have amounted to a cumulative $13.7 billion over the past 60 years. South Korea has now become Germany's third-largest trading partner in Asia. And bilateral trade volume in 2022 reached an impressive $33.7 billion, the highest ever."

— Martin Henkelmann, head of the Korean-German Chamber of Commerce and Industry

=== Education ===
Some high schools in Germany adopt Korean language as a formal elective. As of 2022, South Korea was the fourth most popular destination for German students.

== High-level visits ==
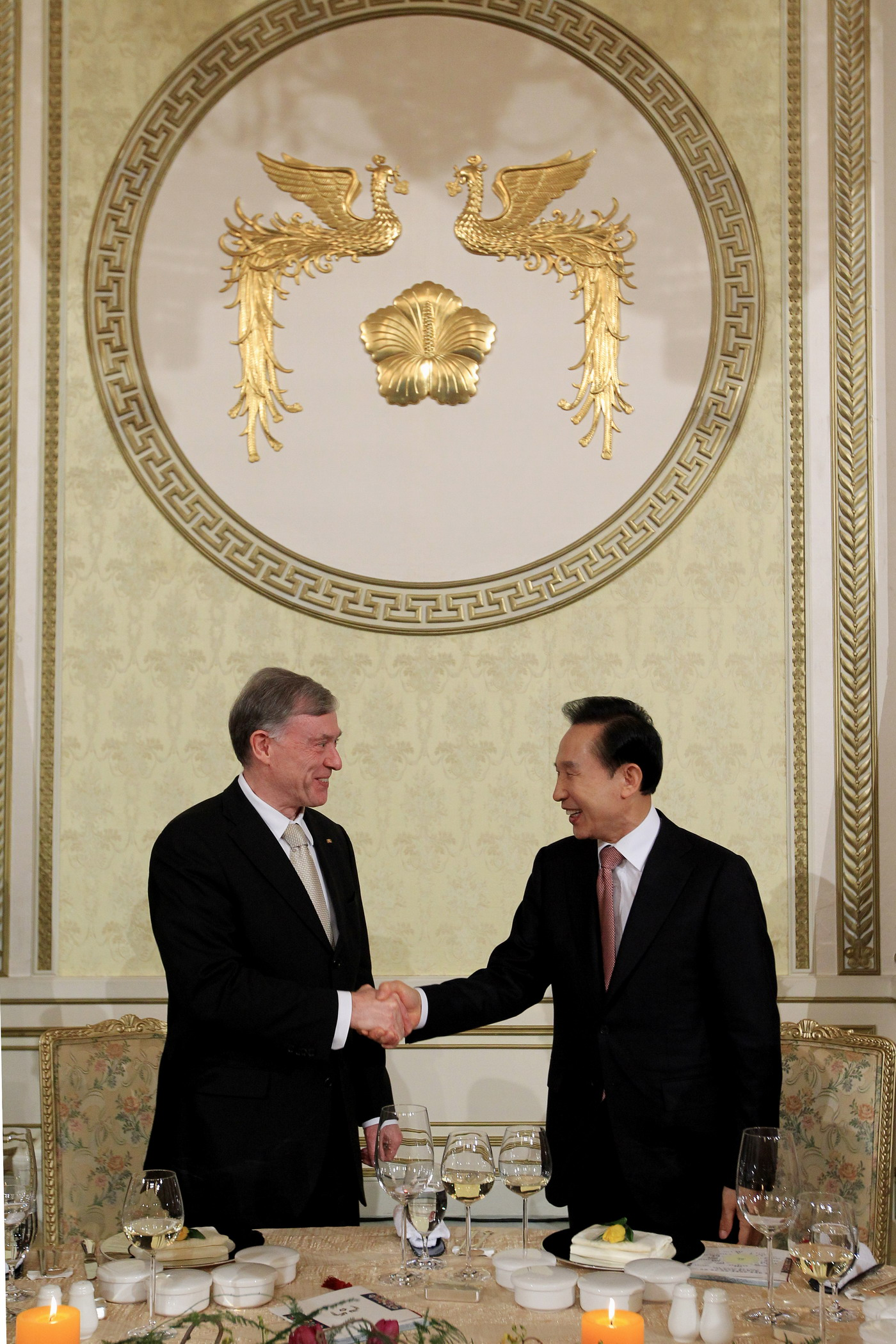
President Lee Myung-bak met with his German counterpart Horst Köhler at Cheong Wa Dae, Seoul on Feb. 8 for a bilateral summit.

High-level visit from Germany to South Korea

- Chancellor Helmut Kohl (1993)
- President Roman Herzog (1998)
- Chancellor Gerhard Schröder (2000)
- Chancellor Johannes Rau (2002)
- President Horst Köhler (2010)
- Chancellor Angela Merkel (2010 & 2021)
- President Joachim Gauck (2015)
- President Frank-Walter Steinmeier (2018 & 2022)
- Chancellor Olaf Scholz (2023)

High-level visit from South Korea to Germany

- President Park Jeong-hee (1964)
- President Chun Doo-hwan (1986)
- President Kim Young-sam (1995)
- President Kim Dae-Jung (2000)
- President Roh Moo-Hyun (2005)
- President Park Geun-Hye (2014)
- President Moon Jae-in (2017)

== Resident diplomatic missions ==
- Germany has an embassy in Seoul.
- South Korea has an embassy in Berlin, an embassy office in Bonn and a consulates-general in Frankfurt and Hamburg.
Embassy of Germany in Seoul

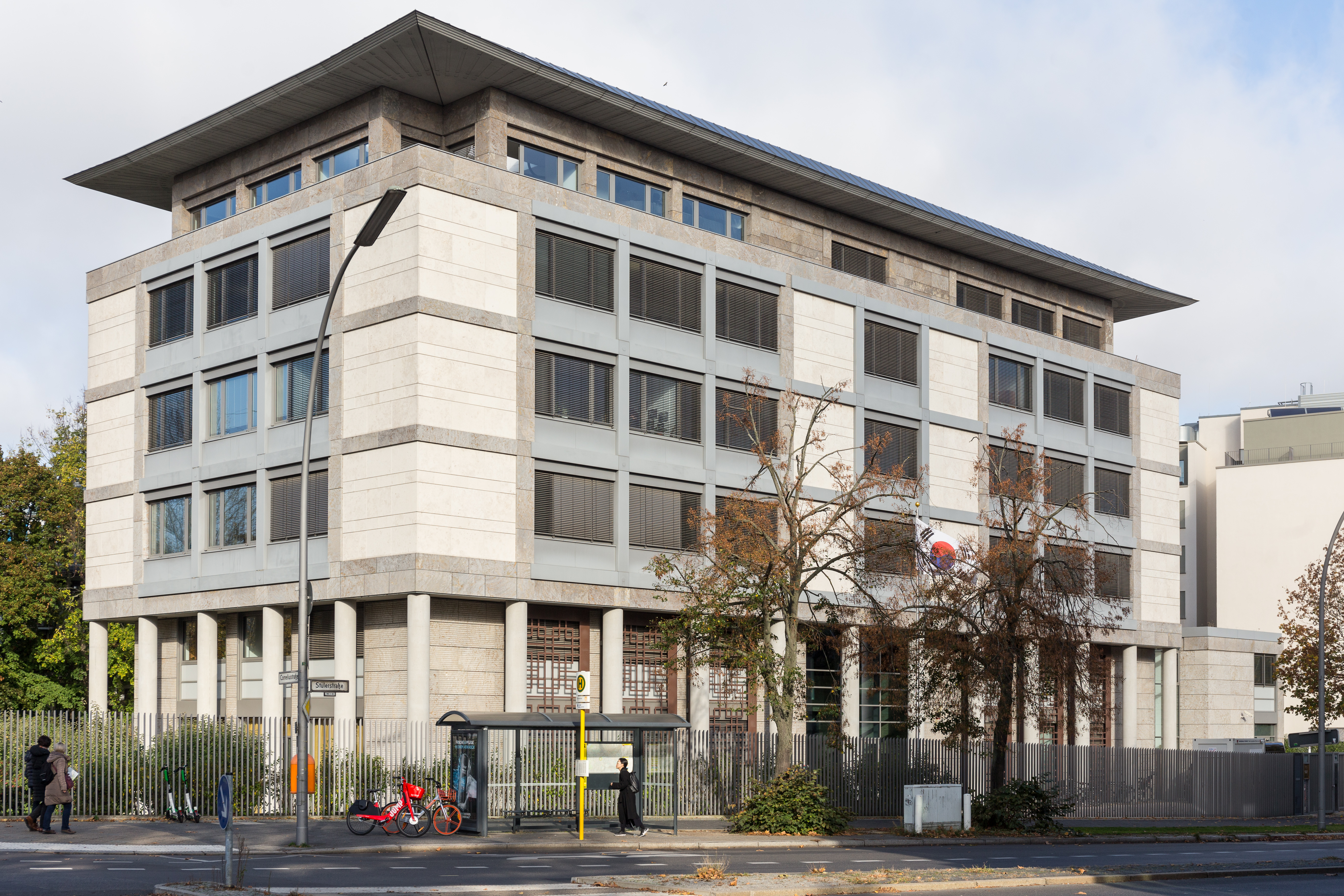
Embassy of South Korea in Berlin

== See also ==
- Foreign relations of Germany
- Foreign relations of South Korea
- Indo-Pacific Strategy of South Korea
- Germany–North Korea relations
- Koreans in Germany
