= Germans in Korea =

Ethnic group in Korea

Total population
- Total population not known

Regions with significant populations
- South Korea: 10,763 (2024)
- North Korea: Unknown

Languages
- German, Korean

Religion
- Christianity, others

Related ethnic groups
- Germans

Germans in Korea have a history dating back to the late 19th century, consisting of diplomats, traders, and immigrants, as well as their descendants. While the community has historically been small, it has played a significant role in the modernization of Korea and continues to be a vibrant part of the country's expatriate population.

The relationship began in the 1880s following the Germany–Korea Treaty of 1883. Notable figures from this era include Paul Georg von Möllendorff, who served as a foreign advisor to King Gojong. In the modern era, the community expanded through economic cooperation and the establishment of the "Dogil-maeul" (German Village) in Namhae, which was built for Korean nurses and miners who returned from West Germany.

According to South Korean government statistics, as of the 2020s, there are several thousand German nationals residing in South Korea, primarily concentrated in Seoul and the Gyeonggi region. The community is supported by various institutions, including the German School Seoul International and the Goethe-Institut.

== History ==
The first German to set foot on Korean soil, in 1832, was the Lutheran missionary Karl Gützlaff, who is also credited with importing the potato. He was followed by Shanghai-based businessman Ernst Oppert, who from 1866 to 1868 made three attempts to force Korea open to foreign trade, and German consul to Japan Max von Brandt, who in 1870 landed at Busan in an attempt to open negotiations, but was sent away by Korean officials there. Prussian orientalist Paul Georg von Möllendorff lived in Korea from 1882 to 1885 as the director general of the customs service. One German trading company, H. C. Eduard Meyer & Co., set up operations in Incheon at his suggestion in 1886. Several Germans also became prominent in Emperor Gojong's administration; Japan-based bandmaster Franz Eckert composed the Anthem of the Korean Empire for the emperor in 1902, while Richard Wunsch served as Gojong's personal physician from 1901 to 1905, and Antoinette Sontag (the former housekeeper of Karl Ivanovich Weber) was hired as majordomo in charge of the palace's household affairs.

After the signing of the 1905 Eulsa Treaty, which deprived Korea of the right to conduct its own foreign relations, German diplomats in Korea were required to leave the country. Many more private individuals had departed by the time of the 1910 Japan-Korea Annexation Treaty. However, when Hermann Lautensach visited Korea in 1933, there were still a handful living there, including an entire monastery of Benedictine monks near Wonsan, Kangwon-do. They continue to operate a monastery at Waegwan, near Daegu.

Some Koreans settled in Germany during the 1960s and 1970s have begun returning to South Korea after retirement, bringing German spouses with them; this return migration has resulted in the creation of the Namhae German Village of roughly 75 households in South Gyeongsang. The German population in South Korea shrank by roughly 25% between 1999 and 2005.

In 2024, population of German in Korea has reached 10,000.

== Education ==
Ferdinand Krien set up the Imperial German Language School in Seoul, which ran from 1898 to 1911. The German School Seoul International was founded in 1976 for the families of German expatriates in and near the South Korean capital. The Goethe-Institut opened a reading room in Pyongyang in 2004, but closed it in 2009 over censorship concerns.

== Notable people ==
- Norbert Vollertsen, human rights activist who worked in North Korea from 1999 to 2001
