= Germany–North Korea relations =

- Germany: North Korea

Diplomatic mission
- North Korean Embassy, Berlin: German Embassy, Pyongyang

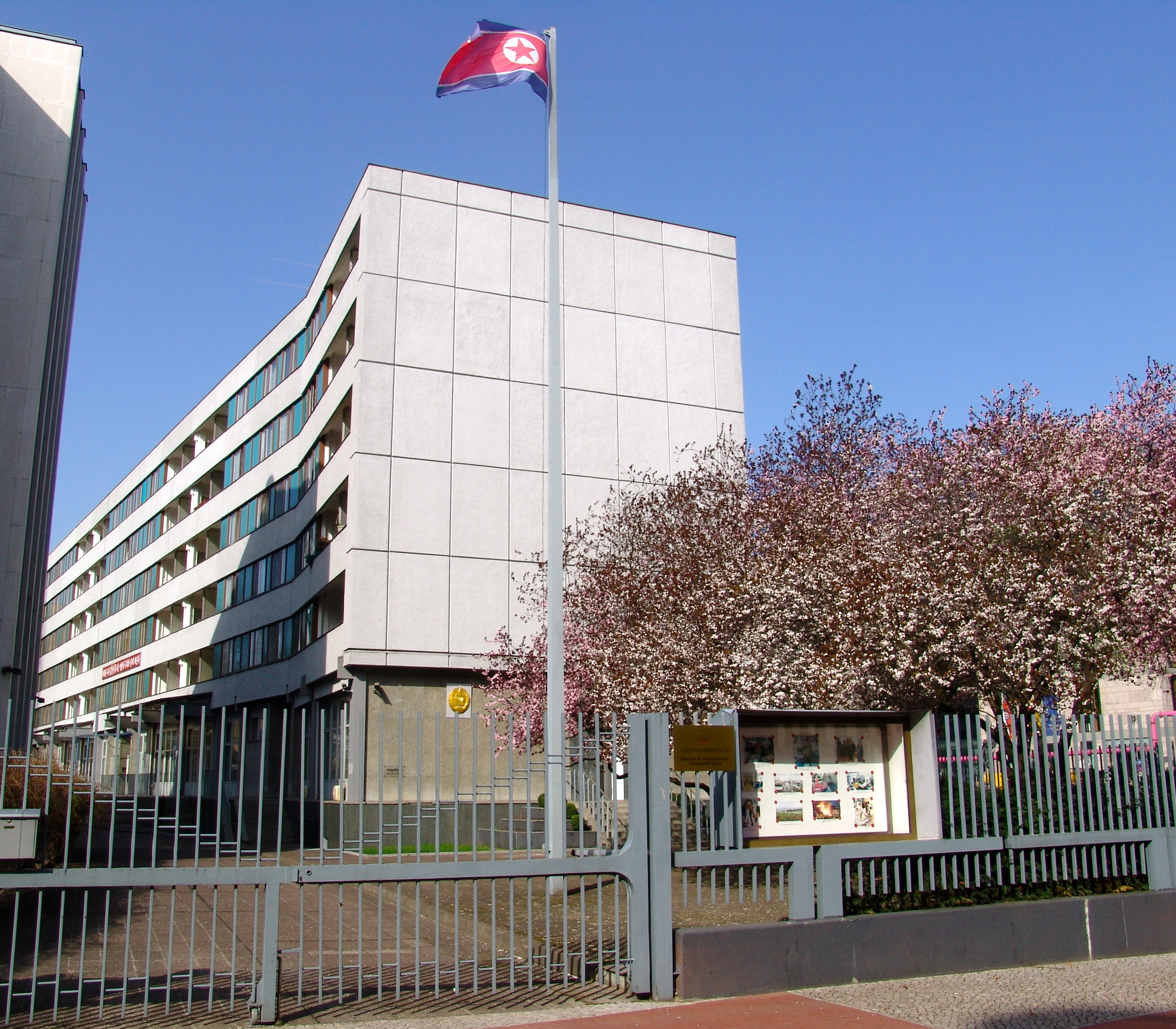
North Korean embassy in Berlin, Germany.

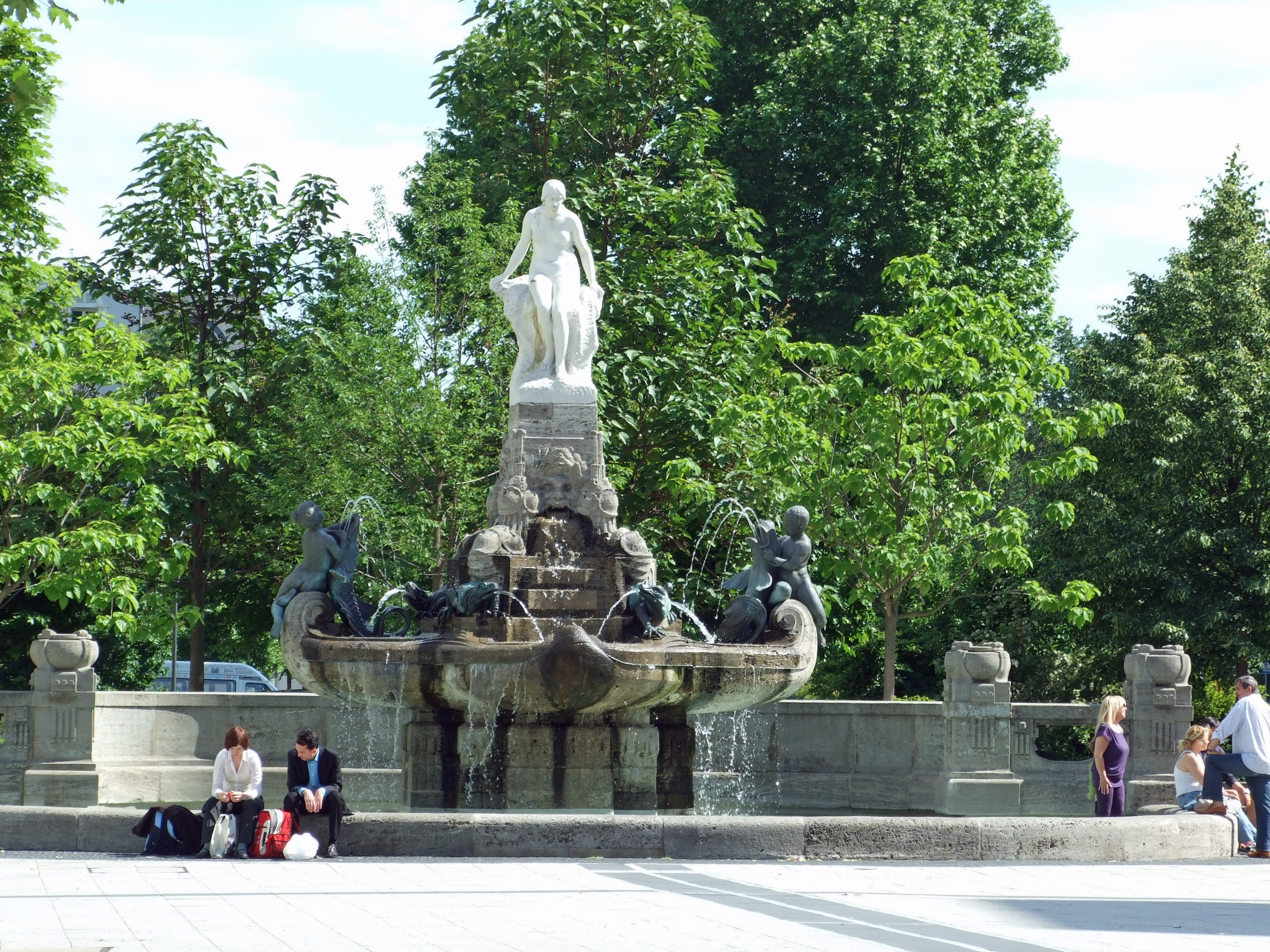
The Fairy Tale Fountain in Frankfurt was rebuilt with help from North Korea.

Germany–North Korea relations (Korean: 도이췰란드-조선민주주의인민공화국 관계) are the bilateral relations between Germany and the Democratic People's Republic of Korea (DPRK), commonly known as North Korea. During the Cold War, East Germany maintained diplomatic relations only with North Korea, while West Germany maintained diplomatic relations only with South Korea. East Germany ceased to exist upon German reunification, which meant that diplomatic relations no longer existed between Germany and North Korea. The two countries appointed protecting powers to represent their interests in the other country, Sweden being the protecting power for Germany, and China being the protecting power for North Korea.

Germany and North Korea established diplomatic relations with each other in 2001. The German embassy in Pyongyang remains in the old East German embassy compound, which is now shared with the Swedish and British embassies.

Since the establishment of diplomatic relations, there have been no visits of government delegations at ministerial level to Germany or North Korea. However, there have been several official visits to North Korea by members of the German Bundestag.

According to a 2013 BBC World Service Poll, only 3% of Germans view North Korea's influence positively, with 90% expressing a negative view, one of the most negative perceptions of North Korea in the world.

Since 1997, DHL, a German logistics company, has offered postal service to Pyongyang, North Korea, making it one of the only international couriers that have a presence there. However due to sanctions, there are restrictions on what can be shipped.

== History ==
East Germany–North Korea relations
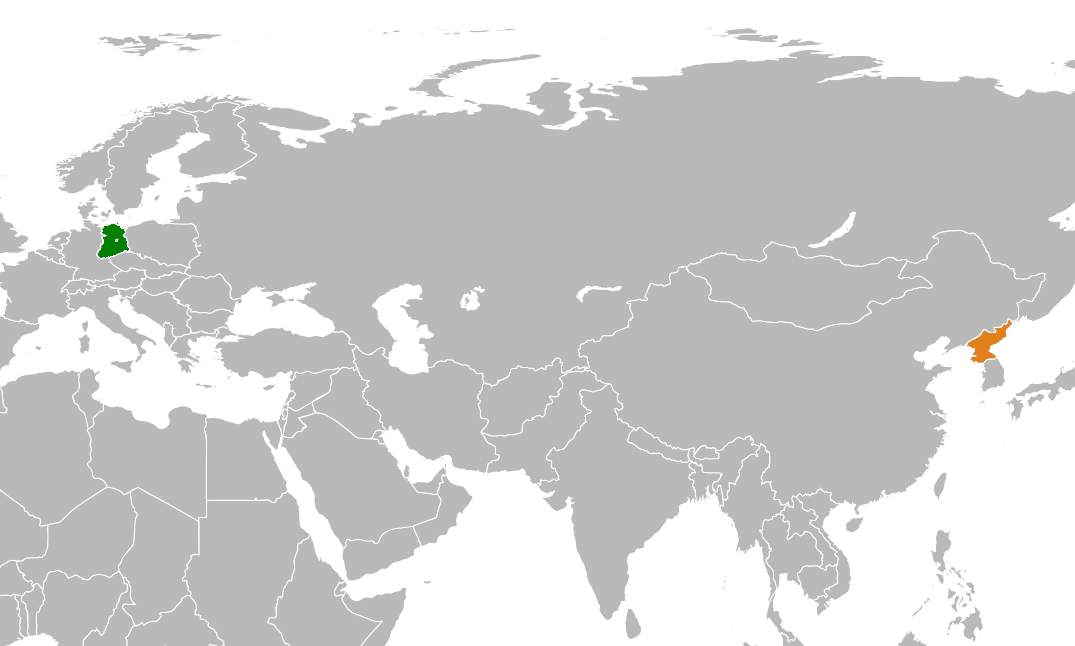

- East Germany: North Korea

Diplomatic mission
- North Korean Embassy, Berlin: German Embassy, Pyongyang

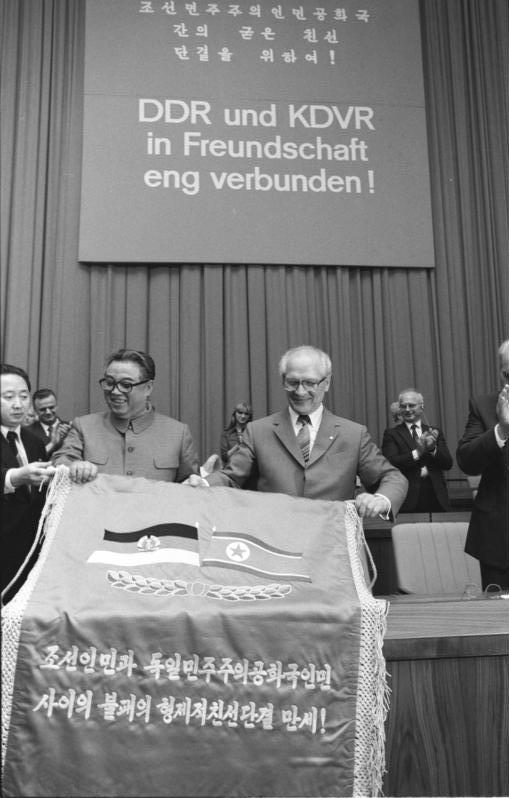
Erich Honecker and Kim Il Sung in East Berlin (1984)

In the aftermath of the Second World War, the Korean Peninsula was split into two parts: the communist, Soviet-aligned Democratic People's of Korea (DPRK) in the north and the capitalist, western-aligned Republic of Korea (ROK) in the south. Shortly after the foundation of the DPRK on 9 September 1948, North Korean leader Kim Il Sung established diplomatic relations with East Germany. At the dawn of the Cold War, Germany had been divided along similar lines between the Communist, Soviet-aligned German Democratic Republic (GDR/DDR) in the east and the capitalist, western-aligned Federal Republic of Germany (FRG/BRD) in the west. In 1949, East German Foreign Minister Georg Dertinger wrote that "Germany's democratic forces feel particularly bound together with the Korean people, who, like the German people, are fighting for national unity and for the recognition of their rights on the international stage".

In North Korea, East Germany found a potential trading partner, a source of educational exchange, and an opportunity to increase its standing within the Communist world. After the Soviet Union and the People's Republic of China, East Germany was the third largest provider of foreign aid to North Korea. This assistance was grounded in traditions of fraternal solidarity between socialist states. Kim Il Sung also enjoyed a close personal relationship with East German General Secretary Erich Honecker. Honecker visited Pyongyang in 1977, while Kim reciprocated by visiting East Berlin in 1980.

From 1955 to 1962, the East German government ran a large-scale programme to reconstruct the port cities of Hamhung and Hungnam, which had been severely damaged by US air raids during the Korean War (1950–53). Under the Deutsche Arbeitsgruppe (DAG), East German city planners, architects, technical personnel and craftsmen were sent to North Korea. The DAG built housing, industrial areas, hospitals, schools, hotels, a concert hall, and an outdoor swimming pool. The work was funded by the East German government and donations from East German citizens. The first Head of City Planning for the Hamhŭng project was the Bauhaus trained architect Konrad Püschel.

After the Sino-Soviet split in 1960, North Korea aligned itself with China under Mao Zedong, while East Germany grew closer with the Soviet Union. As a result, the relationship between the two countries began to chill. In 1962, North Korean exchange students sent to study in East German universities were suddenly recalled by the North Korean government. North Korea had sent its first exchange students in 1953, the closing year of the Korean War, and by 1956 there were around 350 in East Germany. All of the exchange students were young, unmarried men and while romantic involvement with East German women forbidden, it was not uncommon. In some cases this resulted in engagements, marriages, pregnancies, and young families. After their separation, the children stayed with their mothers and grew up in East Germany, whilst their fathers returned back to North Korea. The majority of these Germans never saw their father, husband or lover ever again. The German-Korean director Cho Sung-hyung made a film about German-Korean families in 2015.

In 1991, North Korea offered the now deposed Erich Honecker asylum in the country. Honecker had traveled to Moscow in an attempt to escape prosecution for mass murder stemming from his role in issuing the notorious Schießbefehl, by which East German Border Troops were ordered to shoot anyone attempting cross the Inner German Border towards West Germany.

After the collapse of the Soviet Union, the East German Embassy was closed until after German reunification. The former North Korean Embassy in East Berlin was turned into an Office for the Protection of the Interests of the Democratic People’s Republic of Korea, with the People's Republic of China acting as protecting power. The reunified Germany and North Korea established diplomatic relations on 1 March 2001.

== German embassy in Pyongyang ==
In 2001, the German Embassy in Pyongyang was reestablished and Germany tried to bring North Korea to the six-party talks to discuss about the problem of the North Korean nuclear weapons program. Due to nuclear tests in January, February and September 2016, Germany imposed sanctions, and followed the UN and European Union. This led to a deterioration of the bilateral relations between both countries, which means no more shipping of luxury goods from Germany to North Korea as well as an arms embargo. A complete prohibition of foreign trade and other sanctions could influence the expansion of further nuclear tests.

But before the harsh international answer to the forbidden tests of missiles and nuclear weapons in North Korea, Germany was seeking a peaceful exchange with providing education on terms of scholarships for Korean students or bringing the German language to Korea. Therefore, Germany provides a position for a German lecturer with help from the German Academic Exchange Service at the Kim Il Sung University. In the eighties, two lecturers were at the university to teach German, and close relations existed with the section of the Korean Studies at the Humboldt University in East Berlin. Since then a lot of North Koreans could visit Germany and profit from cultural exchange.

One reason was because of the Sunshine Policy of the former South Korean president Kim Dae-jung, a new and better diplomatic relationship with North Korea and a few EU members was possible so that Germany as a cultural nation could set up projects, with for example the Goethe-Institut. Because of UN-sanctions, Germany could not host North Korean researchers i.e. engineers or scientists.

As German diplomats are not allowed to have a bank account in North Korea, they have to get everything from China, including cash and even their food.

== North Korean embassy in Berlin ==
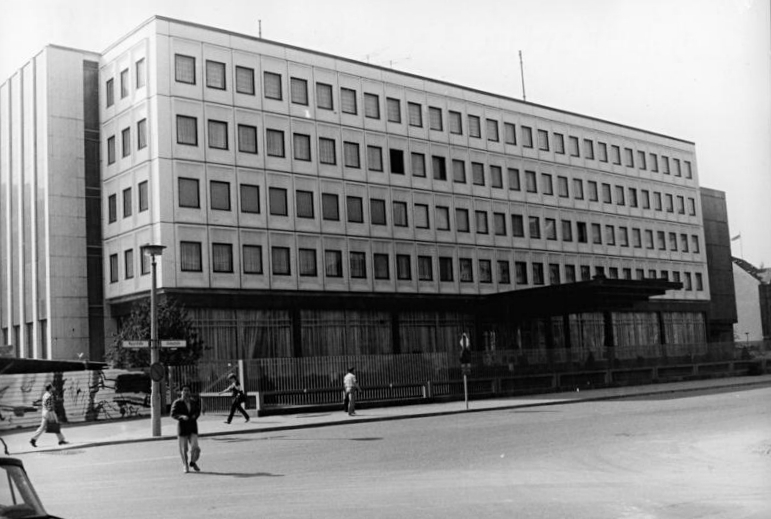
North Korea embassy in East Berlin (1987)

After the readmission of the diplomatic bilateral relations between North Korea and Germany, like Germany did in Pyongyang, North Korea also moved back to their old embassy building in Berlin which they used at the time when Germany was still divided. The current ambassador Park Nam-yong took office in 2017.

The once entirely occupied building for the North Korean representatives is only partly used for the embassy. The official building moved to the Glinkastraße 5–7 in Berlin, so the other parts of this building were used among other things as a hostel for tourists. Germany threatened to shut down the hostel, in order to curb Pyongyang's nuclear weapons capability from May 2017. The hostel was eventually closed in 2020.

== See also ==
- Foreign relations of Germany
- Foreign relations of North Korea
- Germany–South Korea relations
