= Mo Eun-seol =

South Korean writer

- 모은설
- Born: South Korea
- Education: Literature
- Occupation: Screenwriter
- Years active: 1996 to present
- Organization(s): Korea Television and Radio Writers Association (KTRWA)
- Notable work: Culinary Class Wars

Korean name
- Hangul: 모은설
- RR: Mo Eunseol
- MR: Mo Ŭnsŏl

Mo Eun-seol (Korean: 모은설) is a South Korean entertainment writer recognized for her contributions to various television programs. She began her career as a freelance writer at KBS in 1996 and has worked on notable shows, including Happy Together 3, Happy Sunday, Our Neighborhood Arts and Physical Education, Weekly Idol, Fantastic Duo, Let's Eat Dinner Together Season 2, Carefree Travelers and Problem Child in House. Mo's work has received several awards, including the Broadcast Writer Award in the Show and Entertainment Category at the 2011 KBS Entertainment Awards, the 200th PD of the Month Award, and the 9th Republic of Korea Arts and Culture Award in the Broadcast Writer Category.

Mo was the writer of Netflix's Culinary Class Wars, which became the first Korean unscripted title to rank No. 1 on Netflix's Global Top 10 TV (Non-English) list for three consecutive weeks. For her work on this program, Mo received the Best Writer award at the 37th Korea Broadcasting Writer Awards. Culinary Class Wars also won the Grand Prize in the Broadcast category at the 61st Baeksang Arts Awards.

== Career ==
=== Early career ===
Mo Eun-seol developed early interest in writing, contributing to a children's newspaper during her school years. She studied Korean Literature in college and initially planned to become a reporter. In 1996, while in her fourth year of college, she interned at KBS on the show TV Carries Love. When a writer left unexpectedly, director Kim Sang-geun offered her the opportunity to write a script. This led her to pursue a full-time career as a writer after a probationary period of 2–3 months.

=== Career as television variety show writer ===
Mo is the creator of Global Talk Show, a program featuring foreigners sharing their perspectives on Korea, which began with a Chuseok special featuring foreign women. Her professional philosophy emphasizes innovation and experimentation. Despite the challenges of finding suitable participants, the production team recruited individuals from universities and language institutes, ultimately pioneering a new format for talk shows.

Weekly Idol started as a low-budget filler segment but evolved into a successful cable television program. It ran for nearly eight years and established a unique position in idol-related programming. Mo's collaboration with Jung Hyung-don was particularly noteworthy. However, disagreements with the broadcasting station led to the departure of the original production team.

After decades at KBS, Mo Eun-seol joined SBS and began working on Fantastic Duo. Despite initial challenges related to viewership ratings and competition with King of Mask Singer, the show found success by highlighting collaborations between ordinary people and their favorite singers. The show resonated with viewers by showcasing the performers' raw emotions, such as men singing Im Chang-jung's "A Shot of Soju," which added emotional depth to the songs. This positive word-of-mouth helped stabilize the show's ratings. In recognition of its success, Fantastic Duo received The 200th PD of the Month Award from the Korea PD Association in October 2016.

Seeking a novel approach to travel programming, Mo Eun-seol drew inspiration from a conversation with Jung Hyung-don about his package tour experience, which led to the creation of Carefree Travelers. Recognizing the popularity of package tours among South Koreans, the show aimed to depict authentic travel experiences. It resonated with viewers by featuring middle-aged men with limited independent travel experience, inspiring many to consider similar trips with friends.

=== International success and critical acclaim: Culinary Class Wars ===
Culinary Class Wars is a South Korean cooking competition show that premiered on Netflix in 2024. The program features 100 chefs, including 20 "white spoons" (renowned chefs) and 80 "black spoons" (lesser-known professionals), competing for a prize of 300 million won (approximately $222,000 USD).

The show was created by executive producer Yun Hyun-joon, directors Kim Hak-min and Kim Eun-ji, and head writer Mo Eun-seol from Studio Slam, a Korean production company. Yun envisioned a cooking competition akin to Master Chef but distinct from existing Korean programs such as Please Take Care of My Refrigerator or Korean Food War. Building on his previous collaboration with Netflix on Take 1, Yun pitched the new concept directly to Netflix executives.

As this was Mo Eun-seol's first cooking show, she dedicated significant time and effort to developing ideas. Every weekend, she visited cooking libraries, explored books, and analyzed approximately 400 pages of cooking shows for inspiration, aiming to create a unique competition.

Production began in June 2023, with writer meetings in August and five months of preparation. Meetings focused on three key elements: innovative visuals and diverse missions. The team introduced new concepts throughout the show, which was originally titled "Unknown Chef 100" before evolving into Black and White Chef: Culinary Class War. After interviewing 300 to 400 chefs, they selected 100 participants. Each had no prior knowledge of their future competitors.

The production team confirmed judges Paik Jong-won and Ahn Sung-jae, who would evaluate dishes while blindfolded. The show employed a two-judge system, deviating from the standard three-judge format to emphasize the judges' discussion process. Mo believed that this new format would reveal different aspects of Paik Jong-won. Ahn Sung-jae, chef of Korea's only 3-Michelin-star restaurant, was selected for his clear judgment.

The set, spanning 1,000 pyeong (approximately 3,300 square meters), was designed in black and white. The first episode featured 20 chefs and 80 culinary masters. Forty chefs cooked simultaneously, wearing attire according to their class, and performed missions accordingly. The competition emphasized the "class battle" concept by addressing the "white spoons" by name and the "black spoons" by nicknames, distinguishing it from traditional cooking survival shows. The entire process, from initial planning to the first broadcast, took a year.

Culinary Class Wars achieved international recognition, debuting as the first Korean unscripted series to reach No. 1 on Netflix's Global Top 10 TV (Non-English) list for three weeks. Netflix data indicates the show garnered 3.8 million views (calculated by dividing total hours watched by the series' running time) between September 16 and 22, 2024, and appeared in the Top 10 lists in 18 countries. Viewership increased the following week, with data released on October 2, 2024, showing 4.9 million views between September 23 and 29, a rise of 1.1 million from the previous week.

According to Good Data Corporation, (Note: Good Data Corporation (굿데이터코퍼레이션은) is an online public opinion analysis service. It analyzes online information and public opinion by field. Provides TV topical broadcasting program, online topic ranking, and quality evaluation of performers and marketing effect analysis. TV topicality survey target dramas that were being aired or scheduled to be broadcast. Unlike the audience rating, which measures only the viewing time for the broadcast time, TV topicality is to diagnose the evaluation by examining, indexing, and analyzing the netizens' reactions that appeared in online news, blogs, communities, Twitter, and videos for one week after each program was broadcast.) Culinary Class Wars consistently ranked first in integrated TV-OTT non-drama topicality for seven weeks, beginning in the third week of September 2024 and extending through the fourth week of October. It briefly fell to second place in the fifth week before regaining the top position in the first week of November. While its overall rank decreased to fourth in the second week of November, it remained the top-ranked non-drama program. The show's cast members also featured prominently in Good Data's non-drama performer buzzworthiness rankings. (Note: From the 3rd to 4th week of September 2024, Paik Jong-won ranked 1st, Choi Hyun-seok 2nd, Ahn Sung-jae 3rd, and Choi Kang-rok 5th (4th week only). By the 1st week of October, Ahn Sung-jae rose to 1st, Paik Jong-won was 2nd, and Choi Hyun-seok 3rd. In the 2nd week of October, Ahn Sung-jae ranked 1st overall (drama and non-drama), followed by Paik Jong-won 2nd, Edward Lee 3rd, Kwon Sung-jun 4, and Choi Hyun-seok 5th. Rankings in subsequent weeks included Ahn Sung-jae 2nd, Paik Jong-won 3rd, Kwon Sung-jun 4, and Edward Lee 7th (3rd week of October), and Ahn Sung-jae 2nd and Paik Jong-won 5th (4th week of October). In the 5th week of October, Kang Seung-won was 3rd, Choi Hyun-seok 9th, and Ahn Sung-jae 10th.)

Good Data researcher Eo Yu-seon noted that the show's initial topicality score of 50,000 points was significant, reaching levels comparable to Transfer Love 2 (2022) and representing the highest score for original content released in 2024. In the fourth week of September 2024, it maintained its top spot with a 66.1% increase in topicality, recording 81,000 points, the highest weekly score since 2022 and the highest among Netflix original dramas and non-dramas since The Glory Part 2.

Culinary Class Wars was recognized as Korea's Favorite Program by Gallup Korea in September and October 2024. (Note: Survey conducted by Gallup Korea from September 24 to 26, 2024, of 1,001 people aged 18 or older nationwide about their favorite TV show these days (up to 2 responses were allowed)) Its preference rating increased from 5.2% in September to 7.8% in October, making it the first web variety show to rank first in a survey of preferred programs, and the second among Netflix's own productions to achieve this ranking. Several OTT programs, such as The Glory (Netflix, 1st rank in March 2023) and Moving (Disney+, 1st rank in September 2023), had previously entered the top 10, with Whirlwind (Netflix, 1st rank in July 2024) being the only other to achieve this in 2024.

On October 15, 2024, Netflix announced the renewal of Culinary Class Wars for a second season, scheduled for release in 2025. According to Mo, casting for Season 2 is expected to be less challenging than for Season 1 due to the established concept. Mo aims to invite chefs of comparable caliber to those from Season 1.

In December 2024, the show received the FunDex Award 2024 from Good Data in the OTT Original Show Category. In May 2025, it won the Grand Prize in the Broadcast category at the 61st Baeksang Arts Awards, marking the first time an entertainment program has received this honor in the history of the Baeksang Arts Awards.

== Writing style ==
Mo's ability to remain relevant after two decades of leading multiple programs annually results from her engagement with trending content, including webtoons and movies. This involvement helps her build a database of information that became reference for her work.

Mo served as a lecturer at the "2025 Future Leaders Camp" held in Gangneung, Gangwon Province. The camp included 150 young people in their 20s and 30s for a program lasting two nights and three days. During her lecture, Mo emphasized that "a leader is not someone who gives orders, but someone who brings people together." She shared advice for junior writers, encouraging attendees not to underestimate themselves and to embrace new challenges. She also acknowledged the growing influence of artificial intelligence (AI) but highlighted that fostering growth, emotional connection, and inspiring others ultimately depends on human relationships.

== Filmography ==
=== Television shows ===
| Year | Title | | Network | Credited as | | Ref. |
| Year | English | Korean | Network | Assistant Writer | Main Writer | Ref. |
|---|---|---|---|---|---|---|
| 1996 | TV Carries Love | TV는 사랑을 싣고 | KBS2 | Yes | —N/a | |
| 1998 to 2001 | Freedom Declaration Today is Saturday | 연예대상 작가상 수상 작품이력 | KBS2 | Yes | —N/a | |
| 1998 | Music Bank | 뮤직뱅크 | KBS2 | Yes | —N/a | |
| 1999 to 2001 | Emotional Channel @21 | 감성채널 @21 | KBS2 | Yes | —N/a | |
| 2001 | Happy Together | 해피투게더 | KBS2 | Yes | —N/a | |
| 2001 — 2003 | Music Plus | 뮤직플러스 | KBS2 | Yes | —N/a | |
| 2003 | Vitamin | 비타민 | KBS2 | Yes | —N/a | |
| 2004 | Happy Sunday | 해피선데이 | KBS2 | Yes | —N/a | |
| 2004 — 2010 | Sangsang Plus | 상상플러스 | KBS2 | Yes | —N/a | |
| 2006 — 2010 | Global Talk Show | 글로벌토크쇼-미녀들의 수다 | KBS2 | Yes | —N/a | |
| 2009 — 2013 | Qualifications of Men | 남자의 자격 | KBS2 | Yes | —N/a | |
| 2009 — 2022 | Yoo Hee-yeol's Sketchbook | 유희열의 스케치북 | KBS2 | —N/a | Yes | |
| 2009 — 2010 | Teacher is coming | 선생님이 오신다 | MBC every1 | —N/a | Yes | |
| 2010 — 2013 | Win Win | 김승우의 승승장구 | KBS2 | —N/a | Yes | |
| 2010 — 2018 | Weekly Idol | 주간아이돌 | MBC every1 | —N/a | Yes | |
| 2013 | 1 vs 100 | 1대100 | KBS2 | —N/a | Yes | |
| 2013 | Mom Running in High heels | 하이힐을 신고 달리는 엄마 | SBS FunE | —N/a | Yes | |
| 2013 | Approximately Show | 어럽쇼! | QTV | —N/a | Yes | |
| 2014 — 2016 | Our Neighborhood Arts and Physical Education | 우리동네 예체능 | KBS2 | —N/a | Yes | |
| 2013 — 2014 | Exo's Showtime | EXO의 쇼타임 | MBC every1 | —N/a | Yes | |
| 2014 | Show Time - Burning The Beast | 쇼타임 - 버닝 더 비스트 | MBC every1 | —N/a | Yes | |
| 2014 | Hitmaker | 형돈이와 대준이의 히트제조기 | MBC every1 | —N/a | Yes | |
| 2014 | Apink's Showtime | 에이핑크의 쇼타임 | MBC every1 | —N/a | Yes | |
| 2015 | SISTAR's Showtime | 씨스타의 쇼타임 | MBC every1 | —N/a | Yes | |
| 2015 | Don't Worry Music | 돈워리 뮤직 | Kstar | —N/a | Yes | |
| 2016 — 2017 | Fantastic Duo | 판타스틱 듀오 | SBS | —N/a | Yes | |
| 2016 — 2017 | Lipstick Prince | 립스틱프린스 | OnStyle | —N/a | Yes | |
| 2017 | My Foreigner Friend | 나의 외사친 | JTBC | —N/a | Yes | |
| 2017 — 2018 | Carefree Travellers | 뭉쳐야 뜬다 | JTBC | —N/a | Yes | |
| 2017, 2018, 2023, 2025 | The Gentlemen's League | 뭉쳐야 뜬다 | JTBC | —N/a | Yes | |
| 2018 — 2020 | Idol Room | 아이돌룸 | JTBC | —N/a | Yes | |
| 2018 — present | Problem Child in House | 옥탑방의 문제아들 | KBS2 | —N/a | Yes | |
| 2021 | Tiki Taka | 티키타카 | SBS TV | —N/a | Yes | |
| 2021 | Long Live Independence | 독립만세 | JTBC | —N/a | Yes | |
| 2022 | Hot Singers | 뜨거운 씽어즈 | JTBC | —N/a | Yes | |
| 2024, 2025 | Culinary Class Wars | 흑백요리사: 요리 계급 전쟁 | Netflix | —N/a | Yes | |

== Accolades ==
=== Awards and nominations ===
| Award ceremony | Year | Category | Nominee | Result | Ref. |
|---|---|---|---|---|---|
| Baeksang Arts Awards | 2007 | Best Entertainment Program | Global Talk Show | Won | |
| Baeksang Arts Awards | 2025 | Grand Prize (Television) | Culinary Class Wars | Won | |
| Baeksang Arts Awards | 2025 | Best Entertainment Program | Culinary Class Wars | Nominated | |
| 9th Korea Arts and Culture Awards | 2022 | Best Broadcasting Writer | Mo Eun-seol | Won | |
| KBS Entertainment Awards | 2007 | Special Merit (Note: shared with the whole team) | Global Talk Show | Won | |
| KBS Entertainment Awards | 2011 | Best Writer | Win Win | Won | |
| 37th Korea Broadcasting Writer Award | 2024 | Best Writer | Culinary Class Wars | Won | |
| 200th PD of the Month Awards | 2016 | Best Drama/Entertainment | Fantastic Duo | Won | |
