= Culinary Class Wars =

South Korean cooking competition television series

- Hangul: 흑백요리사: 요리 계급 전쟁
- Hanja: 黑白料理師: 料理 階級 戰爭
- Lit.: Black and White Chef: Culinary Class Wars
- RR: Heukbaek yorisa: yori gyegeup jeonjaeng
- MR: Hŭkpaek yorisa: yori kyegŭp chŏnjaeng
- Genre: Cooking show; Reality competition
- Written by: Mo Eun-seol
- Directed by: Kim Hak-min; Kim Eun-ji
- Judges: Paik Jong-won; Anh Sung-jae
- Music by: Park Gyo-yeon; Seok Seung-hee
- Country of origin: South Korea
- Original language: Korean
- No. of seasons: 2
- No. of episodes: 25

Production
- Cinematography: Hong Jung-pyo
- Running time: 60–96 minutes
- Production company: Studio Slam

Original release
- Network: Netflix
- Release: September 17, 2024 – present

Related
- Vocal Class Wars

Culinary Class Wars (Korean: 흑백요리사: 요리 계급 전쟁) is a South Korean cooking reality competition television series following a similar elimination-based format to Physical: 100. The first season was released on Netflix in 2024 and featured one hundred chefs divided into two classes: white spoons (veterans) and black spoons (unknown challengers), competing for the prize of ₩300 million. The first three episodes of season two aired on December 16, 2025, with the last episode of the season released on January 13, 2026. In January 2026, Netflix announced the series was renewed for a team-based third season.

== Judges ==
The two judges were veteran restaurateur and celebrity chef, Paik Jong-won, and the only Michelin three-star chef in Korea, Anh Sung-jae. Despite tasting large quantities of food throughout the competition, Paik continued to eat his packed lunch between rounds.

Care was taken to ensure impartial judging. In the first black versus white round, the judges were blindfolded so that they would not be influenced by the status of the contestants. All the food was discarded after judging so that the crew and contestants could not taste it and then challenge or influence the judges' decisions.

== Contestants ==
The contestants were divided at the outset into 20 experienced chefs who were classed as White Spoons and competed under their real names, while the remaining 80 contestants were relatively unknown chefs who were classed as Black Spoons and competed under aliases.

The White Spoons of season 1 were: Ahn You-seong, Bang Ki-su, Cho Eun-ju, Choi Hyun-seok, Choi Ji-hyung, Choi Kang-rok, Edward Lee, Fabrizio Ferrari, Hwang Jin-seon, Jang Ho-joon, Jung Ji-sun, Joseph Lidgerwood, Kim Do-yoon, Kim Seung-min, Lee Young-suk, Lu Chinglai, Nam Jeong-seok, Oh Se-deuk, Park Joon-woo, and Seonkyoung Longest.

The White Spoons of season 2 were: Lee Jun, Cheon Sang-hyun, Venerable Sunjae, Son Jong-won, Kim Sung-woon, Kim Hee-eun, Kim Geon, Hu Deok-juk, Park Hyo-nam, Jennie Walldén, Shim Sung-chul, Jung Ho-young, Sam Kim, Raymon Kim, Song Hoon, Lee Geum-hee, Im Seong-geun, and Choi Yu-gang. The Hidden White Spoons were Choi Kang-rok and Kim Do-yun.

== Season 1 ==
Its format was a cookery contest with different challenges in each round and elimination of contestants until only one remained.

=== Round 1: Black Spoon Elimination Challenge ===
In the first round, the 80 Black Spoons were given 100 minutes to cook a personal signature dish.

One of the judges would taste the dish, and then decide if the contestant would move on to the next round, or if they were eliminated on the spot. Contestants could also be deferred if the judge tasting their dish was unsure if they should progress to the next round, and allowed for the other judge to weigh in with a second opinion.

For this round, 20 Black Spoon chefs were chosen to advance to the next round, to match the number of White Spoon chefs. As fewer than 20 contestants had received passes to continue to the next round at the end of the cooking time, the judges chose from the deferred contestants to fill the remaining places. The 20 White Spoons were given a bye and automatically advanced to the second round.

The 20 survivors of this round and their signature dishes were as follows. The final four required a second opinion.

1. Goddess of Chinese Cuisine – Dongpo snowflower dumplings (Judged by Paik Jong Won)
2. Hidden Genius – Spaghetti aglio e olio (Judged by Anh Sung Jae)
3. Genius Restaurateur – Tongyeong-style bibimbap + dried pollock-skin sundae (Judged by Paik Jong Won)
4. Side Dish Chef – mixed-grain rice, seaweed soup with Perilla seed powder, braised Japanese Spanish mackerel, 3 kinds of seasoned vegetables (Judged by Anh Sung Jae)
5. Yeong Chicken – assorted chicken dishes (Judged by Paik Jong Won)
6. God of Seasoning – Golden ratio Mapo tofu (Judged by Paik Jong Won)
7. One Two Three – Bonghwa duck with Korean blackberry (Judged by Anh Sung Jae)
8. Triple Star – Lobster with pepper sauce + Lobster Kinilaw (Judged by Paik Jong Won)
9. Auntie Omakase #1 – Assorted home-cooked meals (Judged by Paik Jong Won)
10. Self-Made Chef – Eight Treasure meatball (Judged by Anh Sung Jae)
11. Comic Book Chef – Dongpo pork from Oishinbo + Crab Spring Roll from Iron Wok Jan (Judged by Paik Jong Won)
12. Meat Master – Galb uignon (Judged by Paik Jong Won)
13. Celebrities' Chef – Vegetarian Sashimi + vegetarian Futomaki (Judged by Anh Sung Jae)
14. Seung-woo's Dad – Sous vide chicken breast + winter watermelon salad (Judged by Paik Jong Won)
15. Yakitori King – Korean chicken yakitori with various cuts (Judged by Paik Jong Won)
16. Kitchen Boss – Braised octopus + lemon cheese pasta (Judged by Anh Sung Jae)
17. Napoli Matfia – Naples fresh pasta with 3 kinds of potato purée (Judged by Anh Sung Jae)
18. Cooking Maniac – Cod milt with curry butter sauce, fried fish with asparagus, brocoli and saffron veloute sauce (Judged by Anh Sung Jae)
19. Chef Spark – seafood fresh pasta (Judged by Anh Sung Jae)
20. Master of School Meals – Boiled pork and Ssamjang, Gochujang-fried anchovies, Yukgaejang, kimchi, lettuce wraps (Judged by Anh Sung Jae)

=== Round 2: Black vs. White 1-on-1 Match ===
In the second round, the White Spoons and Black Spoons competed against each other in 1-on-1 matches. White Spoons were called to the stage and a Black Spoon could join if they would like to challenge them. If a White Spoon received two or more opponents, they could choose whom they would like to compete against. The pair then chose between 20 fridges which contained a random ingredient they must use in any dish of their own devising. Contestants were given 70 minutes to cook their dish, then the two creations were then subject to a blind tasting by the judges who were blindfolded and hand-fed by spoon. The judges voted anonymously and then removed their blindfold if the decision was unanimous. If there was a tie, the contestants were asked to leave so that the judges could deliberate on both dishes and make a final decision. The contestant of the winning dish would then advance while the other was eliminated. At the end of the round, both judges selected one contestant each among those who were eliminated to receive a "super pass" and return to the competition.

Color key

- Contestant won their match and advanced to Round 3
- Contestant received a "super pass" from the judges
- Contestant lost their match and was eliminated

Key

○	Judge voted for the White Spoon's dish
●	Judge voted for the Black Spoon's dish

Black vs. White 1-on-1 Match results
Main Ingredient	White Spoon	Black Spoon	Judges' Vote	
Main Ingredient	White Spoon	Black Spoon	Paik Jong-won	Ahn Sung-jae
Mugeunji	Edward Lee (Mugeunji pork neck salad)	Meat Master (Skate-bacon mugeunji samhap)	○	○
Siraegi	Jung Ji-sun (Deep-fried siraegi basi with black vinegar)	Goddess of Chinese Cuisine (Siraegi sea bream stew)	●	○
Beef rump	Lee Young-suk (Miso gomtang)	Genius Restaurateur (Jeonriptugol)	○	○
Maesaengi	Cho Eun-ju (Maesaengi-flavored abalone)	Kitchen Boss (Barley risotto with scallops and maesaengi	○	○
Live octopus	Jang Ho-joon	Yakitori King	○	○
Pig's trotter	Ahn You-seong	Yeong Chicken	○	○
Ogyeopsal	Choi Ji-hyung (Grilled Maekjeok and Kaesong-style seasoned vegetables)	Triple Star (Ogyeopsal Tteokgalbi with Epoisses sauce)	●	○
Perilla oil	Choi Kang-rok	Seung-woo's Dad	●	○
Jang trio (Gochujang, Doenjang, Ganjang)	Choi Hyun-seok	One Two Three	○	●
Conger eel	Joseph Lidgerwood (Light Conger Eel with Korean wild black raspberries wine)	Cooking Maniac	●	●
Semi-dried Rockfish	Kim Do-yun	Side Dish Chef	●	●
Skate	Fabrizio Ferrari	Napoli Matfia	○	●
Matured Pumpkin	Hwang Jin-seon	Comic Book Chef	○	○
Oxtail	Lu Chinglai	Self-Made Chef	●	●
Beef tripe	Oh Se-deuk	Hidden Genius	●	○
Bone-in Pork sirloin	Seonkyoung Longest	God of Seasoning	●	○
Mackerel	Kim Seung-min	Auntie Omakase #1	●	●
Humpback shrimp	Nam Jeong-seok	Celebrities' Chef	○	○
Pyogo mushroom	Park Joon-woo	Chef Spark	●	●
Black Chicken	Bang Ki-su	Master of School Meals	●	●

^{[1]} Paik Jong-won chose Goddess of Chinese Cuisine to receive the super pass.
^{[2]} Ahn Sung-jae chose Comic Book Chef to receive the super pass.

=== Round 3: Black vs. White Team Match ===
In the third round, the White Spoons and the Black Spoons divided themselves into two teams, one to cook a meat-based dish and another to cook a seafood-based dish. The White Spoon team in one category competed against the respective Black Spoon team. Each team had 200 minutes to prepare and serve their dish to a panel of 100 audience members, including the two judges. In each match the team with the most votes was declared the winner with all contestants in the team advancing to the next round.

Color key

- Winning Team, all members advance to Round 4
- Losing Team, all members sent to the Consolation Round
- Head Chef

Black vs. White Team Match results
Category	White Spoon			Black Spoon		
Category	Contestant	Dish	Score	Contestant	Dish	Score
Meat	Cho Eun-ju	Hong shao rou with Vegetables	45	Triple Star	Chinese-style Meat-Wrap with Pepper Steak and Radish Salad	55
Meat	Seonkyoung Longest	Hong shao rou with Vegetables	45	Master of School Meals	Chinese-style Meat-Wrap with Pepper Steak and Radish Salad	55
Meat	Jung Ji-sun	Hong shao rou with Vegetables	45	Comic Book Chef	Chinese-style Meat-Wrap with Pepper Steak and Radish Salad	55
Meat	Choi Kang-rok	Hong shao rou with Vegetables	45	Side Dish Chef	Chinese-style Meat-Wrap with Pepper Steak and Radish Salad	55
Meat	Hwang Jin-seon	Hong shao rou with Vegetables	45	Auntie Omakase #1	Chinese-style Meat-Wrap with Pepper Steak and Radish Salad	55
Meat				Self-Made Chef	Chinese-style Meat-Wrap with Pepper Steak and Radish Salad	55
Seafood	Choi Hyun-seok	Flounder Seaweed Soup	54	Chef Spark	Risotto with Chinese-style; Grilled Octopus and Sea Bream	46
Seafood	Nam Jeong-seok	Flounder Seaweed Soup	54	Napoli Matfia	Risotto with Chinese-style; Grilled Octopus and Sea Bream	46
Seafood	Ahn You-seong	Flounder Seaweed Soup	54	Cooking Maniac	Risotto with Chinese-style; Grilled Octopus and Sea Bream	46
Seafood	Edward Lee	Flounder Seaweed Soup	54	Goddess of Chinese Cuisine	Risotto with Chinese-style; Grilled Octopus and Sea Bream	46
Seafood	Lee Young-suk	Flounder Seaweed Soup	54	Hidden Genius	Risotto with Chinese-style; Grilled Octopus and Sea Bream	46
Seafood	Jang Ho-joon	Flounder Seaweed Soup	54			

==== Consolation Round ====
Exclusively for the teams that lost Round 3. Contestants had 40 minutes to prepare any dish of their devising using ingredients typically found in a convenience store. The judges tasted each dish in the order that it was finished. After all dishes were sampled, the judges selected three contestants regardless of their class to advance to Round 4.

Color key

- Contestant was selected to advance to Round 4
- Contestant was eliminated

Consolation Round results
Order	Contestant	Dish	Result
1	Hwang Jin-seon	Pig Trotter Cabbage Wrap	Eliminated
2	Choi Kang-rok	Hot Pepper Saury	Eliminated
3	Cooking Maniac	Ramyeon Pad thai	3rd
4	Jung Ji-sun	Ramyeon You po mian	2nd
5	Goddess of Chinese Cuisine	Kung Pao chicken Chow mein	Eliminated
6	Seonkyoung Longest	American-style Chow mein	Eliminated
7	Napoli Matfia	Chestnut Tiramisu	1st
8	Cho Eun-ju	Chicken Breast with Pineapple Salsa	Eliminated
9	Hidden Genius	Tuna Mayo Toast with Grilled Cabbage & Crabmeat	Eliminated
10	Chef Spark	Convenience Store Carrozza	Eliminated

=== Round 4: Black and White Mixed Team Match: Restaurant Mission ===
For the fourth round, the contestants divided themselves into three teams of five, regardless of class. The head chefs for each team were predetermined by a survey where contestants voted on three others whom they believe are most likely to win the competition. The first place contestant (with eleven votes) was Black Spoon's Triple Star, followed by White Spoon's Choi Hyun-seok and White Spoon's Edward Lee. After all teams were decided, the restaurant mission was announced. Each team has 24 hours to create their own restaurant from the ground up, including its concept, menu items and pricing, and shopping and preparing the ingredients. After the 24 hours, all restaurants will open simultaneously to customers for 2 hours and 30 minutes. For the restaurant with the most sales, all of their members will advance to the Semifinal, while for the restaurant with the lowest sales, all of their members will be eliminated. Only eight contestants will survive based on restaurant sales and judges' evaluations.

Initial team assignments
Team Triple Star	Team Choi Hyun-seok	Team Edward Lee
Triple Star	Choi Hyun-seok	Edward Lee
Self-Made Chef	Ahn You-seong	Lee Young-suk
Side Dish Chef	Jang Ho-joon	Master of School Meals
Nam Jeong-seok	Cooking Maniac	Napoli Matfia
Jung Ji-sun	Auntie Omakase #1	Comic Book Chef

At the six-hour mark, it was announced that each team must dismiss one member whom they believe will be least helpful in the round. Contestants could also volunteer to dismiss themselves. The three dismissed contestants would form a fourth team that must design a new restaurant to compete against the opposing teams. The dismissed contestants were Black Spoon's Self-Made Chef (from Triple Star's team), White Spoon's Ahn You-seong (from Choi Hyun-seok's team), and Black Spoon's Comic Book Chef (from Edward Lee's team). At the end of the 24 hours, the customers were revealed to be twenty mukbang creators. Each customer was given one million won to order as many dishes as they want during the allotted business hours.

Color key

- First place team, all members advance to the semifinal
- Contestant advanced to the semifinal via judges' evaluations
- Contestant was eliminated

Names in bold denote Head Chef.

Black and White Mixed Team Match: Restaurant Mission results
Restaurant		Contestant	Result	
Name	Menu	Contestant	Rank	Sales
The Gazillionaire's Exorbitant Diner (억수르 기사식당)	Truffle Gold Katsu (₩36,000); Lobster Mala Cream Jjamppong (₩42,000); Caviar Roe Bibimbap Heaven (₩58,000)	**Choi Hyun-seok**	1st	₩4,774,000
The Gazillionaire's Exorbitant Diner (억수르 기사식당)	Truffle Gold Katsu (₩36,000); Lobster Mala Cream Jjamppong (₩42,000); Caviar Roe Bibimbap Heaven (₩58,000)	Jang Ho-joon	1st	₩4,774,000
The Gazillionaire's Exorbitant Diner (억수르 기사식당)	Truffle Gold Katsu (₩36,000); Lobster Mala Cream Jjamppong (₩42,000); Caviar Roe Bibimbap Heaven (₩58,000)	Cooking Maniac	1st	₩4,774,000
The Gazillionaire's Exorbitant Diner (억수르 기사식당)	Truffle Gold Katsu (₩36,000); Lobster Mala Cream Jjamppong (₩42,000); Caviar Roe Bibimbap Heaven (₩58,000)	Auntie Omakase #1	1st	₩4,774,000
Triple Chinese Restaurant (트리플 반점)	Mala Cream Shrimp Dim sum (₩24,000); Flame-grilled Bulgogi Bao (₩22,000); Gochujang Butter Gnocchi with Roast Chicken (₩30,000)	**Triple Star**	2nd	₩2,220,000
Triple Chinese Restaurant (트리플 반점)	Mala Cream Shrimp Dim sum (₩24,000); Flame-grilled Bulgogi Bao (₩22,000); Gochujang Butter Gnocchi with Roast Chicken (₩30,000)	Side Dish Chef	2nd	₩2,220,000
Triple Chinese Restaurant (트리플 반점)	Mala Cream Shrimp Dim sum (₩24,000); Flame-grilled Bulgogi Bao (₩22,000); Gochujang Butter Gnocchi with Roast Chicken (₩30,000)	Nam Jeong-seok	2nd	₩2,220,000
Triple Chinese Restaurant (트리플 반점)	Mala Cream Shrimp Dim sum (₩24,000); Flame-grilled Bulgogi Bao (₩22,000); Gochujang Butter Gnocchi with Roast Chicken (₩30,000)	Jung Ji-sun	2nd	₩2,220,000
Mister Jang (Jang 아저씨 식당)	Mister Jang's Ssamjang Pasta (₩13,900); Gochujang Butter Steak (₩34,000); Assorted Jeon with Caviar (₩26,000)	**Edward Lee**	3rd	₩1,498,100
Mister Jang (Jang 아저씨 식당)	Mister Jang's Ssamjang Pasta (₩13,900); Gochujang Butter Steak (₩34,000); Assorted Jeon with Caviar (₩26,000)	Lee Young-suk	3rd	₩1,498,100
Mister Jang (Jang 아저씨 식당)	Mister Jang's Ssamjang Pasta (₩13,900); Gochujang Butter Steak (₩34,000); Assorted Jeon with Caviar (₩26,000)	Napoli Matfia	3rd	₩1,498,100
Mister Jang (Jang 아저씨 식당)	Mister Jang's Ssamjang Pasta (₩13,900); Gochujang Butter Steak (₩34,000); Assorted Jeon with Caviar (₩26,000)	Master of School Meals	3rd	₩1,498,100
The Restaurant that TV Crews line up for (방송국도 줄 서는 식당)	The Blue House Master Chef's Tendon (₩22,000); Dongpo pork from Sung Si-kyung's Grab a Bite (₩24,000); Cooking Master Boy's Mapo tofu (₩20,000)	**Ahn You-seong**	4th	₩1,348,000
The Restaurant that TV Crews line up for (방송국도 줄 서는 식당)	The Blue House Master Chef's Tendon (₩22,000); Dongpo pork from Sung Si-kyung's Grab a Bite (₩24,000); Cooking Master Boy's Mapo tofu (₩20,000)	Self-Made Chef	4th	₩1,348,000
The Restaurant that TV Crews line up for (방송국도 줄 서는 식당)	The Blue House Master Chef's Tendon (₩22,000); Dongpo pork from Sung Si-kyung's Grab a Bite (₩24,000); Cooking Master Boy's Mapo tofu (₩20,000)	Comic Book Chef	4th	₩1,348,000

Among the second and third-place teams, the judges picked four more contestants to advance to the semifinal.

1. Jung Ji-sun – Her Mala Cream Shrimp Dim sum was the best-selling dish (with 39 orders), and she was the first contestant to observe the customers' reactions by checking the leftovers.
2. Triple Star - He was commended for his strong leadership throughout the round.
3. Napoli Matfia - He was commended for his ability to keep the restaurant running smoothly.
4. Edward Lee - He was commended for his communication with customers and adapting his dishes throughout the round.

=== Semifinal Round ===
For the semifinal round, the contestants competed in two themed missions: "Cook Your Life" and "Endless Cooking Hell". Only two contestants will advance to the final round.

==== Cook Your Life ====
The contestants were given 70 minutes to cook a dish representing their life. The judges would evaluate their dish and give a score out of 100 points, then both judges' scores were combined to determine the contestant's total score. The contestant with the most points would automatically advance to the final round.

Color key

- Top Score

Cook Your Life results
Order	Contestant	Dish	Judges' Score		Result	
Order	Contestant	Dish	Paik Jong-won	Ahn Sung-jae	Total Score	Rank
1	Jung Ji-sun	Songshu Guiyu	87	82	169	8
2	Edward Lee	Tuna and Caviar Bibimbap	97	82	179	3
3	Jang Ho-joon	Kuro Tamanegi	91	87	178	5
4	Auntie Omakase #1	Handmade Kal-guksu, Cabbage Jeon, Millet Rice, Geotjeori	90	85	175	7
5	Cooking Maniac	Ugly Onion soup	88	89	177	6
6	Napoli Matfia	Grandmother's Gegukji Pasta	92	90	182	1
7	Triple Star	Clam chowder soup with Toothfish and Caviar	92	87	179	3
8	Choi Hyun-seok	Pasta Vongole	93	88	181	2

As the winner of the "Cook Your Life" mission, Napoli Matfia automatically advanced to the final round without competing in the next semifinal mission.

Color key

- Contestant survived the round
- Contestant was eliminated in this round

Infinite Cooking Hell results
Contestant	Round 1	Round 2	Round 3	Round 4	Round 5	Round 6	Judge's Comment for Elimination
Edward Lee	Tofu, Pine Nut and Soy Milk Soup	Tofu and Scallops	Jasmine Tea-smoked Tofu with Duck Breast and Egg Yolk Sauce	Tofu Pasta alla Ruota with Gochujang Sauce	Kentucky-Fried Tofu	Tofu Crème Brûlée	**Winner** - Edward Lee had the most innovative uses for tofu and his dishes encompassed a larger variety than the other contestants
Triple Star	Sesame Seed and Tofu Dressing Salad	Tofu Menbosha	Rockfish and Tofu Jjigae	Western-styled Mapo Tofu	Gamtae Tofu Noodles	Mexican-Inspired Tofu	Too similar to the dish he prepared in Round 4
Cooking Maniac	Tuna-wrapped Tot and Tofu Salad	Tofu sheet-wrapped Spring Rolls	Ugly Caesar Salad	Tofu Tteok-galbi Sandwich	Agedashi Tofu		Not as creative or as well executed as the others' dishes
Jang Ho-joon	Ganmodoki	Edamame and Tofu Gratin	Pistachio Tofu Salad	Tofu and Brisket Rice Bowl			Not as creative or as well executed as the others' dishes
Auntie Omakase #1	Tofu, Pyogo Mushroom and Spring Onion Dumplings	Tofu Jjigae	Tofu and Crown Daisy Salad				Not innovative enough
Jung Ji-sun	Fried Tofu with Salted Egg Yolk Sauce	Tofu Dim Sum					Not overly flavourful
Choi Hyun-seok	Lamb "Milanese" with Saffron Risotto and Mapo Tofu sauce						Usage of tofu was arbitrary and did not contribute to the overall dish

=== Final Round ===
The final round's theme was a "name on the line" dish. The two chefs had to prepare any dish of their desire within the span of 80 minutes. Similarly to the second round's 1-on-1 match, the judges had to vote independently from one another, albeit with the caveat that instead of a deliberation period, the chefs would have to create another dish should the judges not unanimously agree on the best dish. Prior contestants were invited to return and spectate the final round.

At the start of the round, Napoli Matfia's real name was revealed to be Kwon Seong-joon.

The two dishes were:

Edward Lee: Tteokbokki semifreddo with a gochujang caramel served with a chamoe-makgeolli "old fashioned."

Inspiration: Edward joined the competition to get in touch with his Korean heritage and noticed how chefs were typically generous with their portions, especially with tteokbokki. He realised that this came from a place of love and he made a dish to commemorate the leftover tteokbokki.

Kwon Seong-joon: Piedmontese-style pistachio-crusted lamb rack with barollo wine sauce, mushrooms and beet and lamb heart ravioli.

Inspiration: Kwon interpreted his "name" as referring to his life, and as of such wanted to create a dish that represented his entire being. The wine was selected due to it both being a vintage from the year he was born, as well as his favourite grape varietal.

Kwon Seong-joon was declared the winner and won the ₩300 million prize.

== Season 2 ==
Similar to Season 1, the show was aired as a series of cooking challenges. The show began with another 100 chefs, with them competing against each other and the clock.

=== Round 1: Black Spoon Elimination Challenge ===
The first challenge was similar to last season's opening challenge, with the Black Spoons cooking their signature dishes within 100 minutes to impress at least one of the judges to progress to the next phase, and the White Spoons receiving a bye to progress to the next round.

This time, only 18 White Spoon chefs were introduced at the start of the season. Before the challenge began, two additional chefs joined the cooking as "Hidden White Spoons" - Michelin-starred chef Kim Do-yun, and MasterChef Korea winner Choi Kang-rok. Both were White Spoons from Season 1, and had been eliminated in the previous season. They were given a chance to be reinstated as White Spoons, with the caveat that both judges needed to approve of their dish. If a "Hidden White Spoon" managed to reinstate themselves, the number of Black Spoon Chefs that would be allowed to advance would increase. Choi received approval from both judges for his braised eel and vegetables, while Kim only received one yes from judge Paik, eliminating him from the competition. Because Choi successfully reinstated himself, the number of Black Spoon Chefs allowed to progress to Round 2 was raised to 19.

The top 19 Black Spoon Chefs and their dishes are as follows, with the final five being chosen from deferred chefs.

1. Brewmaster Yun – "Brewmaster's Set Meal" with home-distilled soju (Judged by Anh Sung Jae)
2. Dweji-Gomtang in New York – Signature dweji-gomtang (pork dish with soup and rice) (Judged by Paik Jong Won)
3. Seoul Mother – Seoul-style set meal with neobiani beef, beef brisket and radish soup, and cold vegetable salad (Judged by Paik Jong Won)
4. Loner In a Hole In a Wall – "Modern Korean Juansang" with beef and truffle tteokgalbi skewers and mackerel bibimbap (Judged by Paik Jong Won)
5. Little Tiger – "A Humble Drink and Mountain Vegetables" - vegetable juansang with mugwort and tofu mix, seasoned daylily, and coastal hog fennel and blue crab salad (Judged by Paik Jong Won)
6. French Papa – Bouillabaisse (Judged by Paik Jong Won)
7. Culinary Monster – Spring vegetable porridge with truffles (Judged by Anh Sung Jae)
8. Witch With a Wok – Chinese-Korean "Happy Family" Stir-fry (Judged by Paik Jong Won)
9. Barbecue Lab Director – Signature barbecued beef rib (Judged by Paik Jong Won)
10. Iron Arms – Soba noodles with chicken broth tsuyu (Judged by Anh Sung Jae)
11. Annyeong Bonjour – Poached lobster with kimchi bisque (Judged by Anh Sung Jae)
12. Perfect Match – Lobster salad with "lobster shell" tuile (Judged by Paik Jong Won)
13. Boss In the Kitchen – Shrimp porridge with spring greens (Judged by Anh Sung Jae)
14. Banchan Wizard – Banchan set meal with grilled dried pollock with glutinous rice (Judged by Anh Sung Jae)
15. Rebellious Genius – Rabbit and prosciutto roulade with rabbit liver sauce (Judged by Anh Sung Jae)
16. Three Star Killer – Squid ink risotto with fried calamari (Judged by Anh Sung Jae)
17. Knife Omakase – "Four-Course Knife Omakase" set with Chinese yam somyeon, cucumber and plum daikon maki roll, and grilled blackthroat sea perch (Judged by Anh Sung Jae)
18. Fan Master – Unagi-don (grilled eel with rice) (Judged by Paik Jong Won)
19. Trendsetter – Rolled lasagna (Judged by Paik Jong Won)

=== Round 2: Black vs. White Spoon Duels ===
Like the first season, the Black and White Spoon chefs cooked head to head in one-on-one duels, to determine who would progress to the next round. White Spoons would be called forward, and any of the Black Spoons could voluntarily challenge the White Spoon to a cook-off. If more than one Black Spoon wanted to challenge a White Spoon, the latter was allowed to choose their opponent.

This season, the theme of the challenge was "regional specialties". Each of the mystery ingredients came from a particular region of South Korea, and the pairs would have to use that ingredient as the main component of their dishes. The dishes would then be judged head to head in a blind taste test. Judges Paik and Anh would then vote on the winning dish, with the winner advancing to the next round. If the dishes were tied, the judges would then deliberate further on which dish had the edge, before choosing a winner.

At the end of the round, the judges allocated a "super pass" to two eliminated chefs (one for each judge), for them to return to the competition.

Color key

- Contestant won their match and advanced to Round 3
- Contestant received a "super pass" from the judges
- Contestant lost their match and was eliminated

Key

○	Judge voted for the White Spoon's dish
●	Judge voted for the Black Spoon's dish

Black vs. White 1-on-1 Match results
Main Ingredient	White Spoon	Black Spoon	Judges' Vote	
Main Ingredient	White Spoon	Black Spoon	Paik Jong-won	Ahn Sung-jae
Wonju beef tongue	Son Jong-won (Seared beef tongue with black truffle sauce and fried Dubaek potatoes)	Three Star Killer (Seared beef tongue with Sichuan au poivre sauce and fried ginger)	○	○
Gapyeong pine nuts	Venerable Sunjae ("Monk's Smile" pine nut vegetable noodle soup)	Dweji-Gomtang in New York (Vegetable japchae with pine nut sauce)	●	●
Taean blue crab	Hou Deok Juk (Blue crab foo young)	Fan Master (Korean-style blue crab paella)	○	●
Uiryeong quail	Lee Jun (Garlic-infused quail breast roulade and grilled quail legs)	Rebellious Genius ("Quail" - quail breast topped with brioche and poached quail egg)	●	○
Paju cheonggukjang	Im Seong-keun (Cheonggukjang jingujeol gujeolpan - seasoned vegetables with flour pancakes and cheonggukjang)	Loner in a Hole in the Wall (Cheonggukjang mukeunji dumplings)	○	○
Yeosu mustard greens kimchi	Kim Sung-woon (Snailfish and sour kimchi soup)	Boss in the Kitchen (Gat-kimchi agnolotti)	○	○
Changwon sea squirt	Song Hoon ("Mock uni" sea squirt bibimbap)	Culinary Monster (Sea squirt sashimi with Korean herbs and seasonal flowers)	●	●
Mungyeong pork neck	Raymon Kim (Pork neck with Mungyeong magnolia berries and apple honey sauce)	Barbecue Lab Director (Mungyeong pork neck taco)	○	●
Pohang monkfish	Jung Ho-young (Monkfish chawanmushi with steamed ankimo)	Seoul Mother (Braised monkfish stew with rice)	● (first vote) ○ (second vote)	○ (first vote) ● (second vote)
Sokcho whelks	Park Hyo-Nam (Whelk and potato risotto with seasoned seaweed sauce)	French Papa (Herb butter whelk vol-au-vent with cream sauce)	○	○
Jindo large green onions	Choi Kang-rok (Large green onion soup chawanmushi)	Iron Arms (Grilled large green onion with white miso sauce)	○	○
Gongju chestnuts	Lee Keum-Hee (Chestnut porridge)	Brewmaster Yun (Chestnut rice cake soup)	●	●
Sancheong black pig pork shank	Kim Hee-eun (Braised black pork shank with sea cucumber)	Little Tiger (Pork shank jangjorim with joseon japchae	○	●
Jeju meljeot (salted anchovies)	Sam Kim (Pencil squid and meljeot paccheri)	Trendsetter (Potato pancakes with meljeot bagna càuda and grilled shrimp)	○	○
Jeungpyeong pork skin	Jennie Walldèn ("Pork Skin Salad From My Garden")	Witch With a Wok (Pork skin and cumin-crusted ribs)	●	○
Danyang garlic	Kim Geon (Mackerel garlic arancini with garlic purée)	Knife Omakase ("Black and White" garlic ramen)	●	○
Wando gopchang seaweed	Shim Sung-chul (Wando gopchang seaweed seafood porridge)	Annyeong Bonjour (Fried chi-gim with chicken mousse filling and seaweed tuile)	●	●
Gunsan tongue sole	Chun Sang-hyun (Semi-dried, soy sauce-braised tongue sole)	Banchan Wizard (Tongue sole dubu-seon neureumi)	○	○
Jangsu beef chuck flap tail	Choi Yu-Gang ("Many-colored yangjang-fit" - Beef chuck yangjangpi)	Perfect Match (Beef chuck flap tail carpaccio with spring greens)	●	○

^{[1]} Paik Jong-won chose Venerable Sunjae to receive the super pass.
^{[2]} Ahn Sung-jae chose Jung Ho-young to receive the super pass.
^{[3]} The judges voted on this round twice, with both times resulting in a split vote. Each of the judges voted for a different chef in both rounds.

=== Round 3: Black vs. White Team Match: All-or-Nothing ===
In the third round, the White Spoons and the Black Spoons divided themselves into three teams, where the White Spoon team in one match competed against the respective Black Spoon team. All contestants were required to participate in at least one match and can also appear in multiple matches. Contestants that did not participate in a match were allowed to observe the cooking process and advise their team. Each match required the teams to utilize one ingredient from the "Wheel of Land" and one ingredient from the "Wheel of Sea" to create a dish that highlights both ingredients. They must also prepare and serve their dish to a large panel of audience members within an allotted time frame. After each match, the teams would earn points based on the total votes they receive which would be combined into a final score at the end of the round. For the winning team with the most points, all contestants would advance to the next round while for the losing team, all contestants would be subjected to elimination.

==== 7 vs. 7 Match ====
The first match was a 7 vs. 7 match and the judges selected the ingredients: squid from the "Wheel of Sea" (selected by Paik Jong-won) and chamoe from the "Wheel of Land" (selected by Anh Sung-jae). Both teams had 150 minutes to prepare and serve their dish to a panel of 100 audience members, including the two judges. Each vote was worth 1 point.

Color key

- Winning Team
- Losing Team
- Team Captain

Black vs. White Team Match: Round 1 results
Category	White Spoon			Black Spoon		
Category	Contestant	Dish	Score	Contestant	Dish	Score
Squid & Chamoe	Im Seong-geun	Chamoe & Squid Salad	66	Knife Omakase	The Squid & Chamoe; Flower Has Bloomed	34
Squid & Chamoe	Kim Hee-eun	Chamoe & Squid Salad	66	Brewmaster Yun	The Squid & Chamoe; Flower Has Bloomed	34
Squid & Chamoe	Jung Ho Young	Chamoe & Squid Salad	66	Seoul Mother	The Squid & Chamoe; Flower Has Bloomed	34
Squid & Chamoe	Choi Kang-rok	Chamoe & Squid Salad	66	Dweji-gomtang in NY	The Squid & Chamoe; Flower Has Bloomed	34
Squid & Chamoe	Choi Yu-gang	Chamoe & Squid Salad	66	Witch with a Wok	The Squid & Chamoe; Flower Has Bloomed	34
Squid & Chamoe	Hu Deok-juk	Chamoe & Squid Salad	66	Annyeong Bonjour	The Squid & Chamoe; Flower Has Bloomed	34
Squid & Chamoe	Kim Sung-woon	Chamoe & Squid Salad	66	Rebellious Genius	The Squid & Chamoe; Flower Has Bloomed	34

Both Paik Jong-won and Ahn Sung-jae voted for the Black Spoon's dish this match.

==== 5 vs. 5 Match ====
The second match was a 5 vs. 5 match and the teams selected the ingredients: chicken from the "Wheel of Land" (selected by the White Spoons) and pollock roe from the "Wheel of Sea" (selected by the Black Spoons). Both teams had 120 minutes to prepare and serve their dish to a panel of 50 audience members, this time consisting of 25 members that initially voted for the White Spoon's dish and 25 members that initially voted for the Black Spoon's dish, including the two judges. Each vote was worth 2 points.

Color key

- Winning Team
- Losing Team
- Team Captain

Black vs. White Team Match: Round 2 results
Category	White Spoon			Black Spoon		
Category	Contestant	Dish	Score	Contestant	Dish	Score
Chicken & Pollock Roe	Park Hyo-nam	Cock-a-doodle-doo; Embracing Pollock Roe	52	Culinary Monster	Kkanpunggi in Roe Sauce	48
Chicken & Pollock Roe	Sam Kim	Cock-a-doodle-doo; Embracing Pollock Roe	52	Rebellious Genius	Kkanpunggi in Roe Sauce	48
Chicken & Pollock Roe	Son Jong-won	Cock-a-doodle-doo; Embracing Pollock Roe	52	Dweji-gomtang in NY	Kkanpunggi in Roe Sauce	48
Chicken & Pollock Roe	Venerable Sunjae	Cock-a-doodle-doo; Embracing Pollock Roe	52	Barbecue Lab Director	Kkanpunggi in Roe Sauce	48
Chicken & Pollock Roe	Choon Sang-hyun	Cock-a-doodle-doo; Embracing Pollock Roe	52	Witch with a Wok	Kkanpunggi in Roe Sauce	48

Paik Jong-won voted for the Black Spoon's dish and Ahn Sung-jae voted for the White Spoon's dish this match.

==== 3 vs. 3 Ace Match ====
The third match was a 3 vs. 3 ace match with the three best contestants from each team competing and the teams selecting the ingredients: wooreok from the "Wheel of Sea" (selected by the White Spoons) and veal bone-in sirloin from the "Wheel of Land" (selected by the Black Spoons). The teams were also required to incorporate a hidden ingredient in their dish: tofu. Both teams had 60 minutes to prepare and serve their dish to a panel of 10 audience members, including the two judges and eight former contestants from the first season: White Spoons Choi Hyun-seok, Edward Lee, Jang Ho-joon, Jung Ji-sun, and Lu Chinglai, and Black Spoons Auntie Omakase #1, Cooking Maniac, and Napoli Matfia. Each vote was worth 10 points.

Color key

- Winning Team
- Losing Team
- Team Captain

Black vs. White Team Match: Round 3 results
Category	White Spoon (Rockfish)			Black Spoon (Veal Loin)		
Category	Contestant	Dish	Score	Contestant	Dish	Score
Wooreok, Veal Bone-in Sirloin, & Tofu	Son Jong-won	Rockfish Bong Bong	40	Knife Omakase	The Finale Noodles	60
Wooreok, Veal Bone-in Sirloin, & Tofu	Sam Kim	Rockfish Bong Bong	40	Culinary Monster	The Finale Noodles	60
Wooreok, Veal Bone-in Sirloin, & Tofu	Jung Ho-young	Rockfish Bong Bong	40	Barbecue Lab Director	The Finale Noodles	60

The White Spoons received four votes from Edward Lee, Lu Chinglai, Auntie Omakase #1, and Napoli Matfia.

The Black Spoons received six votes from Paik Jong-won, Ahn Sung-jae, Choi Hyun-seok, Jang Ho-joon, Jung Ji-sun, and Cooking Maniac.

The final score was 158 (White Spoons) to 142 (Black Spoons), with the White Spoons winning the Black vs. White Team Match, while the Black Spoons were eliminated.

==== Consolation Round: Last Box Match ====
Exclusively for the team that lost the third round. The Black Spoons had 60 minutes to prepare a dish highlighting a main ingredient of their choice and could only use up to ten additional ingredients, including seasonings, to support their dish. The judges sampled each dish in the order they were completed. After all dishes were sampled, the judges selected two contestants to advance to Round 4.

Color key

- Contestant was selected to advance to Round 4
- Contestant was eliminated

Last Box Match results
Contestant	Chosen Ingredient	Dish	Result
Barbecue Lab Director	Triploid Oysters	The Taste of the Ocean with Frame-Broiled Memories	Eliminated
Annyeong Bonjour	Beef Tenderloin	Beef Tartare	Eliminated
Seoul Mother	Croaker	Brown Croaker Bulgogi Steak	Eliminated
Knife Omakase	Daggertooth Pike Croaker	Daggertooth Pike Shabu-Shabu	Eliminated
Culinary Monster	Asparagus	Grilled Asparagus with Lemon Nuruk Puree	Survived
Witch With A Wok	Egg	Secret Steamed Golden Eggs	Eliminated
Dweji-Gomtang in NY	Black Trumpet Mushroom	Blue Chanterelle Gomtang	Eliminated
Brewmaster Yun	Dried Pollock	Dried Pollock Hangover Soup	Survived
Rebellious Genius	Hidden (Sea Pineapple)	Deep-Fried Sea Pineapple	Eliminated

^{[1]} Rebellious Genius' main ingredient was kept hidden under his request until after his dish was evaluated. When the contestants opened their boxes to reveal their main ingredient, his box was empty.

=== Round 4: Black and White Alliance Match ===
In the fourth round, the contestants formed teams of two to create a dish together. As the winners of the Consolation Round, Black Spoons Brewmaster Yun and Culinary Monster were given first priority in choosing their teammate, then the remaining contestants formed teams among themselves. Teams had 120 minutes to prepare a dish showcasing their synergy. The judges sampled each dish in the order they were completed and then sent each team to either the "survival candidate" pool to be considered for the semifinal round or the "elimination candidate" pool to be considered for elimination. After all dishes were sampled, the judges picked one team to advance to the semifinal round and one team to be eliminated from the competition.

Only seven contestants advanced to the semifinal round: the winning team from the Black and White Alliance Match and five contestants from the 1 vs. 1 Duel.

Color key

- "Survival candidate" team that was selected to advance to the semifinal round
- Team was sent to the "survival candidate" pool, but was not selected to advance
- Team was sent to the "elimination candidate" pool, but was not eliminated
- "Elimination candidate" team that was eliminated

Black and White Alliance Match results
Order	Contestant	Dish	Result
1	Im Seong-geun & Brewmaster Yun	Bakpogalbi & Radish Salad Ssam	Advanced to Semifinal
2	Cheon Sang-hyun & Hu Deok-juk	Mango Lobster Appetizer	Elimination Candidate
3	Choi Yu-gang & Park Hyo-nam	1964 Silk Road Imperial Lobster	Eliminated
4	Son Jong-won & Culinary Monster	Waldorf Salad	Survival Candidate
5	Kim Hee-eun & Venerable Sunjae	Gimbap Bapsang	Elimination Candidate
6	Jung Ho-young & Sam Kim	Miso-grilled Brown Croaker with Prosciutto Sauce	Survival Candidate
7	Choi Kang-rok & Kim Sung-woon	The Land and the Sea	Survival Candidate

==== 1 vs. 1 Duel ====
From the remaining five teams, each contestant cooked head to head in one-on-one duels, to determine who would progress to the next round. Contestants had 100 minutes to cook a dish using only the ingredients they brought for the Black and White Alliance Match. The judges would then vote on the winning dish, with the winning contestant advancing to the next round and the losing contestant being eliminated. If the dishes were tied, the judges would then deliberate further on which dish had the edge, before choosing a winner.

Color key

- Contestant won their match and advanced to the semifinal
- Contestant lost their match and was eliminated

1 vs. 1 Duel results
Order	Contestant		Judges' Vote
1	Sam Kim (Croaker with basil pesto and baked tomato)	Jung Ho-young (Soy-braised croaker with burdock roots)	1 - 1
2	Venerable Sunjae (Ganjang & doenjang bibimbap)	Kim Hee-eun (Herb-smoked abalone, gently infused, served with seaweed mascarpone)	2 - 0
3	Cheon Sang-hyun (Lobster and mango with chili sauce)	Hu Deok-juk (Lobster La Chow Mein)	2 - 0
4	Kim Sung-woon (Crepe and blue crab cream soup stuffed with seasonal seafood)	Choi Kang-rok (If It Were Just Me)	1 - 1
5	Culinary Monster (Crab meat dumplings)	Son Jong-won (Snow crab custard with champagne foam)	1 - 1

^{[1]} Paik Jong-won voted for Jung Ho-young's dish and Ahn Sung-jae voted for Sam Kim's dish.
^{[2]} Paik Jong-won voted for Choi Kang-rok's dish and Ahn Sung-jae voted for Kim Sung-woon's dish.
^{[3]} Paik Jong-won voted for Son Jong-won's dish and Ahn Sung-jae voted for Culinary Monster's dish.

=== Semifinal Round ===
For the semifinal round, the contestants competed in two themed missions: "Endless Cooking Paradise" and "Endless Cooking Hell". Only two contestants will advance to the final round.

==== Endless Cooking Paradise ====
The contestants were given 180 minutes to create dishes with ingredients from an "Endless Pantry" of over 500 ingredients. There were no restrictions on the type of dish or menu, and contestants could attempt as many dishes as they would like. The judges would evaluate their dish and give a score out of 100 points, then both judges' scores were combined to determine the contestant's total score. The top-scoring contestant would also be revealed in real-time, allowing other contestants to break their record if the judges gave them a higher score. The contestant with the highest score at the end of the mission would automatically advance to the final round.

Color key

- Winning Top Score
- Top Score that was broken by a later attempt

Endless Cooking Paradise results
Order	Contestant	Dish	Attempt	Judges' Score		Result
Order	Contestant	Dish	Attempt	Paik Jong-won	Ahn Sung-jae	Result
1	Im Seong-geun	Pogye	1st	82	83	165
2	Venerable Sunjae	Vegetable Stir-fry with Chinese Toon Shoots	1st	87	80	167
3	Im Seong-geun	Chilled Chicken and Pine Nut Juice Salad	2nd	81	78	159
4	Culinary Monster	Seafood Soup	1st	93	65	158
5	Hu Deok-juk	Bird's Nest and Sea Cucumber	1st	87	84	171
6	Culinary Monster	Shrimp Cold Knife-cut Noodles	2nd	90	88	178
7	Jung Ho-young	Blue Crab Renkon Manju	1st	89	85	174
8	Im Seong-geun	Hyojonggaeng	3rd	87	79	166
9	Im Seong-geun	Thin Beef Skirt and Fresh Ginger Salad	4th	83	70	153
10	Im Seong-geun	Garlic Galbi with Kaesong-style Radishes	5th	91	82	173
11	Hu Deok-juk	Fresh Abalone with XO Sauce	2nd	88	83	171
12	Venerable Sunjae	Burdock Root Japchae and Seasoned Deodeok with Pine Nut Juice	2nd	89	84	173
13	Jung Ho-young	Grilled Blackthroat Seaperch, served with Sea Urchin Roe Sauce	2nd	91	80	173
14	Hu Deok-juk	Tomato Snow Crab Fillet	3rd	89	82	171
15	Jung Ho-young	Braised Octopus & Abalone Chilled Vegetables	3rd	93	79	172
16	Jung Ho-young	Tamago Tofu	4th	92	83	175
17	Brewmaster Yun	Bunsik by a Brewmaster	1st	96	84	180
18	Culinary Monster	Olive Flounder	3rd	92	82	174
19	Choi Kang-rok	Mushizushi (Steamed Sushi)	1st	95	90	185

As the winner of the "Endless Cooking Paradise" mission, Choi Kang-rok automatically advanced to the final round without competing in the next semifinal mission.

==== Endless Cooking Hell ====
The remaining six chefs faced an endurance showdown to claim the last spot in the finale. For this round, every dish had to feature carrot as the star ingredient. Chefs had just 30 minutes to whip up something unique using carrots from a big pile set out for them. The judges used three criteria: how central the carrot was in the creation, the creativity of the concept, and the overall execution plus presentation. Dishes were served at the end of the battle, in the order of completion. The chef with the weakest dish in each round was eliminated.

Culinary Monster won this stage by preparing a greater variety of dishes featuring carrot as the primary ingredient, than the other chefs.

Color key

- Contestant survived the round
- Contestant was eliminated in this round

Infinite Cooking Hell results
Contestant	Round 1	Round 2	Round 3	Round 4	Round 5	Judge's Comment for Elimination
Culinary Monster	Warm Carrot Salad	Steamed Carrot Soy Milk Custard with Smoky Carrot Tartare	Carrot Choux with Curry Sauce	Carrot Soup	Carrot Cake	Winner - Culinary Monster had the most innovative uses for carrot, and his dishes demonstrated the greatest impact and variety compared with the other contestants.
Hu Deok-juk	Mini Fried Carrots	La-Mi Carrot and Shrimp Balls	Kkanpung Carrots	Carrot Jjajangmyeon	Yuxiang Carrots	Not innovative enough
Jung Ho Young	Cream Croquette with Carrots	Japanese-Style Braised Carrots	Carrot Katsu Sandwich	Carrot Tamagoyaki		Not as creative or as well executed as the others' dishes
Brewmaster Yun	Cold Sujebi with Carrot Top Sauce	Deep-fried Carrot Seaweed Rolls	Carrot and Egg Tortilla			Not as creative or as well executed as the others' dishes
Venerable Sunjae	Carrot Bibim Noodles and Carrot Kimchi Juice	Carrot Jeon With Pickled Carrots				Not as creative or as well executed as the others' dishes
Im Seong-geun	Carrot Japchae					Not innovative enough

=== Final Round ===
The final round's theme was a "one-of-a-kind" dish. The two chefs had to prepare any dish they would make for themselves in the span of 90 minutes — essentially, they had to cook the best dish for themselves within that time. Similarly to the second round's 1-on-1 match, the judges tasted the finished dishes alongside the participants and voted independently, but instead of a deliberation period, the chefs would have to create another dish if the judges did not unanimously agree on the best dish. As in Season 1, if the judges' selection was unanimous, the match ended and the winner was determined immediately; if there was a difference, there would be endless rematches until a winner was chosen. Prior contestants were invited to return and spectate the final round.

At the start of the round, Culinary Monster’s real name was revealed to be Lee Ha-sung.

The two dishes were:

Lee Ha-sung: Sundaeguk (Blood sausage soup)

In the final, Lee Ha-sung prepared a sundaeguk which he reinterpreted as a high-end dish. The dish was inspired by his father, who would take him to the Korean bathhouse and treat him to this soup afterwards, which Lee described as a comforting, nostalgic, and tear-jerking memory.

Choi Kang-rok: Broth-based dish with sesame tofu

Everyone expected a braised dish, but Choi surprised everyone with a soup featuring sesame tofu. He explained, "I happened to be lucky and became a 'braised braiser' and a 'serial braising expert.' Honestly, I wasn’t that good at braising, but I ‘pretended’ to be. I didn’t even want to braise for myself."

Choi Kang-rok was declared the winner and won the ₩300 million prize. Ahn Sung-jae praised Choi's approach, saying, "I think every chef goes through that ‘pretending’ phase. It’s the same for me. This was very honest food."

== Season 3 ==
On 16 January 2026, Netflix announced the third season of Culinary Class Wars. Unlike the first two seasons, it will employ a team format, with groups of four representing a single restaurant.

== Episodes ==
=== Season 1 ===
No.	Title	Original release date
1	"Episode 1"	September 17, 2024
2	"Episode 2"	September 17, 2024
3	"Episode 3"	September 17, 2024
4	"Episode 4"	September 17, 2024
5	"Episode 5"	September 24, 2024
6	"Episode 6"	September 24, 2024
7	"Episode 7"	September 24, 2024
8	"Episode 8"	October 1, 2024
9	"Episode 9"	October 1, 2024
10	"Episode 10"	October 1, 2024
11	"Episode 11"	October 8, 2024
12	"Episode 12"	October 8, 2024

=== Season 2 ===
No.	Title	Original release date
1	"Episode 1"	December 16, 2025
2	"Episode 2"	December 16, 2025
3	"Episode 3"	December 16, 2025
4	"Episode 4"	December 23, 2025
5	"Episode 5"	December 23, 2025
6	"Episode 6"	December 23, 2025
7	"Episode 7"	December 23, 2025
8	"Episode 8"	December 30, 2025
9	"Episode 9"	December 30, 2025
10	"Episode 10"	December 30, 2025
11	"Episode 11"	January 6, 2026
12	"Episode 12"	January 6, 2026
13	"Episode 13"	January 13, 2026

== Reception ==
=== Critical response ===
The show was rated as suitable for ages 12 and above by the British Board of Film Censors.

The show was the most popular foreign-language series on Netflix in its first week of broadcast, getting about four million views.

Lee Yoon-seo reviewed the show for The Korea Herald. She reported that the show was popular and that the reasons for this included the high level of expertise and creativity displayed by the contestants and their respect for each other's skills. The two judges and their differences of opinion were also thought to make good viewing. She reported that the participants' restaurants had boomed since their exposure on the show. For example, over 20,000 people tried to reserve a table at the Neo restaurant of Choi Kang-rok and its new month of online bookings sold out in one minute.

=== Viewership ===
Culinary Class Wars achieved international recognition, debuting as the first Korean unscripted series to reach No. 1 on Netflix's Global Top 10 TV (Non-English) list for three weeks. Netflix data indicates the show garnered 3.8 million views (calculated by dividing total hours watched by the series' running time) between September 16 and September 22, 2024, and appeared in the Top 10 lists in 18 countries. Viewership increased the following week, with data released on October 2, 2024, showing 4.9 million views between September 23 and 29, a rise of 1.1 million from the previous week.

=== Impact ===
According to Good Data Corporation, (Note: Good Data Corporation (굿데이터코퍼레이션은) is an online public opinion analysis service. It analyzes online information and public opinion by field. Provides TV topical broadcasting program, online topic ranking, and quality evaluation of performers and marketing effect analysis. TV topicality survey target dramas that were being aired or scheduled to be broadcast. Unlike the audience rating, which measures only the viewing time for the broadcast time, TV topicality is to diagnose the evaluation by examining, indexing, and analyzing the netizens' reactions that appeared in online news, blogs, communities, Twitter, and videos for one week after each program was broadcast.) Culinary Class Wars consistently ranked first in integrated TV-OTT non-drama topicality for seven weeks, beginning in the third week of September 2024 and extending through the fourth week of October. It briefly fell to second place in the fifth week before regaining the top position in the first week of November. While its overall rank decreased to fourth in the second week of November, it remained the top-ranked non-drama program. The show's cast members also featured prominently in Good Data's non-drama performer buzzworthiness rankings. (Note: From the 3rd to 4th week of September 2024, Paik Jong-won ranked 1st, Choi Hyun-seok 2nd, Ahn Sung-jae 3rd, and Choi Kang-rok 5th (4th week only). By the 1st week of October, Ahn Sung-jae rose to 1st, Paik Jong-won was 2nd, and Choi Hyun-seok 3rd. In the 2nd week of October, Ahn Sung-jae ranked 1st overall (drama and non-drama), followed by Paik Jong-won 2nd, Edward Lee 3rd, Kwon Sung-jun 4th, and Choi Hyun-seok 5th. Rankings in subsequent weeks included Ahn Sung-jae 2nd, Paik Jong-won 3rd, Kwon Sung-jun 4th, and Edward Lee 7th (3rd week of October), and Ahn Sung-jae 2nd and Paik Jong-won 5th (4th week of October). In the 5th week of October, Kang Seung-won was 3rd, Choi Hyun-seok 9th, and Ahn Sung-jae 10th.)

Good Data researcher Eo Yu-seon noted that the show's initial topicality score of 50,000 points was significant, reaching levels comparable to Transfer Love 2 (2022) and representing the highest score for original content released in 2024. In the fourth week of September 2024, it maintained its top spot with a 66.1% increase in topicality, recording 81,000 points, the highest weekly score since 2022 and the highest among Netflix original dramas and non-dramas since The Glory Part 2.

Culinary Class Wars was recognized as Korea's Favorite Program by Gallup Korea in September and October 2024. (Note: Survey conducted by Gallup Korea from September 24 to 26, 2024, of 1,001 people aged 18 or older nationwide about their favorite TV show these days (up to 2 responses were allowed)) Its preference rating increased from 5.2% in September to 7.8% in October, making it the first web variety show to rank first in a survey of preferred programs, and the second among Netflix's own productions to achieve this ranking. Several OTT programs, such as The Glory (Netflix, 1st rank in March 2023) and Moving (Disney+, 1st rank in September 2023), had previously entered the top 10, with Whirlwind (Netflix, 1st rank in July 2024) being the only other to achieve this in 2024.

On October 15, 2024, Netflix announced the renewal of Culinary Class Wars for a second season, scheduled for release in 2025. According to Mo, casting for Season 2 is expected to be less challenging than for Season 1 due to the established concept. Mo aims to invite chefs of comparable caliber to those from Season 1.

In December 2024, the show received the FunDex Award 2024 from Good Data in the OTT Original Show Category. In May 2025, it won the Grand Prize in the Broadcast category at the 61st Baeksang Arts Awards, marking the first time an entertainment program has received this honor in the history of the Baeksang Arts Awards.

=== Accolades ===
Award ceremony	Year	Category	Recipient(s)	Result	Ref.
Asian Academy Creative Awards	2025	Best Non Scripted Entertainment – Grand Final	Culinary Class Wars	Nominated	
Asian Academy Creative Awards	2025	Best Non Scripted Entertainment – National (Korea)	Culinary Class Wars	Won	
Baeksang Arts Awards	2025	Grand Prize (Television)	Culinary Class Wars	Won	
Baeksang Arts Awards	2025	Best Entertainment Program	Culinary Class Wars	Nominated	
Baeksang Arts Awards	2025	Best Technical Achievement	Lee Young-joo (Production Design)	Nominated	
Baeksang Arts Awards	2026	Best Entertainment Program	Culinary Class Wars 2	Nominated	
Blue Dragon Series Awards	2025	Best Variety Show	Culinary Class Wars	Won	
Blue Dragon Series Awards	2025	Best New Male Entertainer	Yoon Nam-no (Note: Competed under the alias Cooking Maniac)	Nominated	
Broadcast Critics Award	2025	Best Entertainment	Culinary Class Wars	Won	
Fundex Awards (Note: The Fundex Awards is hosted by a K-content competitiveness analysis agency, and is sponsored by a cloud company and an advertising agency.)	2024	Best Entertainment Program	Culinary Class Wars	Won	

== Spin-offs ==
In November 2026, Netflix announced Vocal Class Wars, a music survival spin-off of Culinary Class Wars produced by Studio Slam. Slated to premiere in 2027, the series is led by producing directors Kim Hak-min and Park Sung-hwan. The show adopts the original series' "black-and-white" tiered format, pitting established star vocalists against anonymous challengers who compete using only their voices.
