= Cook Representative =

- Promotional poster
- Genre: Variety; Cooking
- Presented by: Kim Sung-joo; Ahn Jung-hwan; Kang Ho-dong
- Starring: Choi Hyun-seok; Sam Kim; Lee Won-il; Lee Yeon-bok; Oh Se-deuk; Jung Ho-young; Choi Hyung-jin; Lee Chan-oh; Yoo Hyun-soo
- Country of origin: South Korea
- Original language: Korean
- No. of episodes: 25

Production
- Production location: South Korea
- Running time: 70 minutes

Original release
- Network: JTBC
- Release: February 17 – August 10, 2016

Cook Representative (Korean: 셰프 원정대 - 쿡가대표), also known as National Chef Team, is a 2016 South Korean cooking-variety program starring Kim Sung-joo, Ahn Jung-hwan, Kang Ho-dong, Choi Hyun-seok, Sam Kim, Lee Won-il and, Lee Yeon-bok, is the spin-off of Please Take Care of My Refrigerator. It aired on JTBC during Wednesdays at 22:50 (KST) beginning February 17, 2016. The series aired its last episode August 10, 2016 after concluding the finals match of the World Championship.

== Cast ==
=== Hosts ===
- Kim Sung-joo
- Ahn Jung-hwan
- Kang Ho-dong
- Henry Lau (Ep. 2–3)

=== Chefs ===
- Choi Hyun-seok
- Sam Kim (Ep. 1–3, 22–25)
- Lee Won-il
- Lee Yeon-bok
- Oh Se-deuk (Ep. 4–25)
- Jung Ho-young (Ep. 4–6)
- Choi Hyung-jin (Ep. 7–9)
- Lee Chan-oh
- Yoo Hyun-soo

=== Culinary Judges ===
- Chef Wayne Golding
- Ralf Dohmeier
- Stefano Di Salvo
- Nikolaos Kordonias
- David Mitford

== Episodes ==
Episodes	Chefs	Place	Results	Notes
1–3	Choi Hyun-seok; Sam Kim; Lee Won-il; Lee Yeon-bok	Hong Kong	First Match: 2:0 (Team Hong Kong wins); Second Match: 2:1 (Team Hong Kong wins)	Special Host: Henry Lau
4–6	Choi Hyun-seok; Oh Se-deuk; Jung Ho-young; Lee Yeon-bok	Japan (Osaka)	First Match: 2:0 (Team Korea wins); Second Match: 2:1 (Team Korea wins)	
7–9	Choi Hyun-seok; Choi Hyung-jin; Oh Se-deuk; Lee Yeon-bok	China (Chengdu)	First Match: 2:1 (Team Korea wins); Second Match: 2:1 (Team Korea wins)	
10	Choi Hyun-seok; Oh Se-deuk; Lee Won-il; Lee Chan-oh	South Korea	2:0 (Team Korea wins)	Special Match against France in Korea; Special Judges: Julian Quintart, Sam Okyere, Takuya Terada
11–13	Choi Hyun-seok; Oh Se-deuk; Lee Won-il; Yoo Hyun-soo	UAE (Dubai)	First Match: 2:0 (Team UAE wins); Second Match: 2:0 (Team UAE wins)	Special Guest: Wendy from Red Velvet
14–17	Choi Hyun-seok; Oh Se-deuk; Yoo Hyun-soo; Lee Yeon-bok	Thailand (Bangkok)	First Match: 2:1 (Team Korea wins); Second Match: 2:1 (Team Korea wins)	
17–21	Choi Hyun-seok; Oh Se-deuk; Lee Chan-oh; Yoo Hyun-soo	United States (San Francisco)	First Match: 2:0 (Team USA wins); Second Match: 2:1 (Team USA wins)	
22–25	Choi Hyun-seok; Oh Se-deuk; Sam Kim; Lee Yeon-bok	South Korea	Quarter-finals; Block A: Team Korea 1 wins; Block B: Team UAE wins; Block C: Team USA wins; Block D: Team Korea 2 wins; Semi-finals; First Match: Team Korea 1 wins; Second Match: Team USA wins; Third Placer Match: Team UAE wins; Finals; Team Korea 1 wins	World Championship (opponents from previous countries): Quarter-Finals; Block A: Team Korea 1 v. Team China; Block B: Team Japan 1 v. Team UAE; Block C: Team Japan 2 v. Team USA; Block D: Team Korea 2 v. Team France; Semi-Finals; Block A v. Block B (Team Korea 1 v. Team UAE); Block C v. Block D (Team USA v. Team Korea 2); Third Placer Match: Team UAE v. Team Korea 2; Finals; Team Korea 1 v. Team USA
