= Choi Kang-rok =

South Korean chef and restaurateur

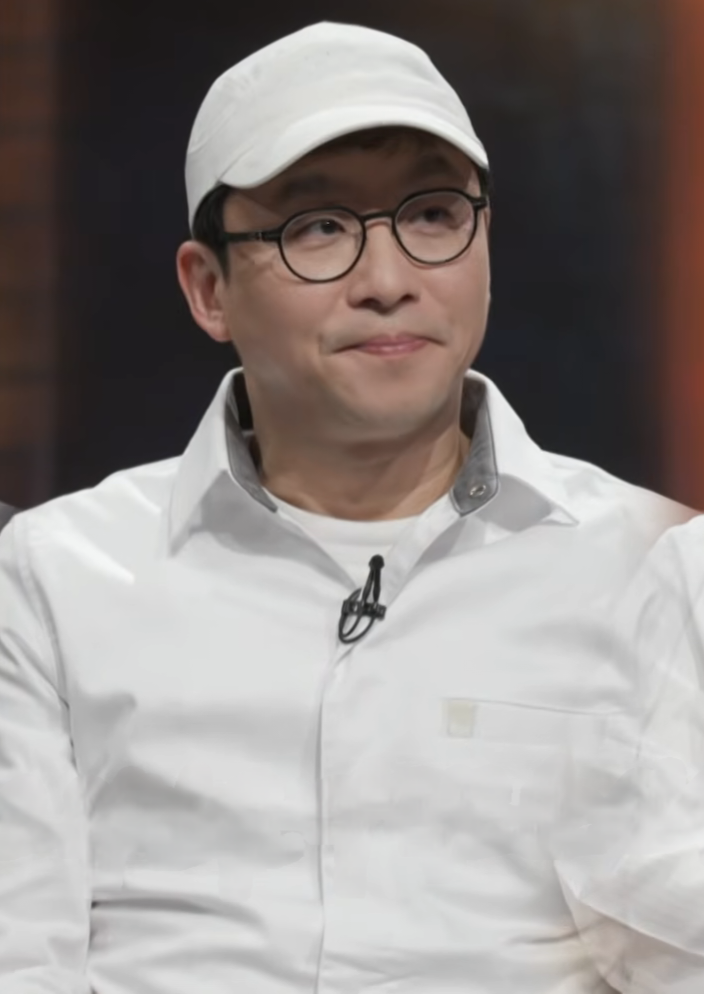
- Choi in March 2026
- Born: 1978 (age 47–48)
- Culinary career
- Cooking style: Japanese cuisine

Korean name
- Hangul: 최강록
- RR: Choe Gangrok
- MR: Ch'oe Kangnok

Choi Kang-rok (Korean: 최강록; born 1978) is a South Korean chef and restaurateur. In 2025, he won the second season of Culinary Class Wars as a White Spoon chef.

== Early life ==
At Jungsan High School, Choi played in a band as a drummer and wanted to be a professional musician. After failing to enter music school, he studied Spanish at Hankuk University of Foreign Studies.

== Career ==
=== Restaurants ===
Early in his life, Choi worked as a part-timer in kitchens to pay for music equipment. He then read the manga Mr. Sushi King, about a sushi chef, which led him to open, run, and subsequently close "Two failed sushi shops." Afterward, he moved to Japan, enrolled in its Tsuji Culinary Institute to study Culinary Technology Management, and learned the Japanese language.

In 2022, Choi opened a Japanese restaurant, Neo, in the Songpa District of Seoul, South Korea. It closed down in 2024, even with a surge in popularity after the first season of Culinary Class Wars, as Choi felt that he no longer had the capacity to run it. Despite his success after winning the second season, Choi stated that he had no plans to open another restaurant shortly after.

=== Media ===
In 2013, Choi won the second season of MasterChef Korea. He had applied "after seeing a commercial and during a night of drinking"; at the time, he was a tuna trader trying to pay off his debts from failed businesses.

In 2016, Choi appeared on What Shall We Eat Today – Delivery. In 2024, he was a recurring member of Please Take Care of My Refrigerator.

In 2025, Choi was the host of Netflix's Blank Menu for You. He also participated in the first season of Culinary Class Wars as a White Spoon but was eliminated in the team battle in the third round. On it, viewers lauded "his awkward yet endearing personality—paired with an otaku-coded charm and undeniable cooking skill."

In 2026, Choi returned to Culinary Class Wars for its second season as a returning White Spoon. Having reached all the way to the finals, he cooked a soup, using sesame tofu and other favourite ingredients, along with a serving of soju, which clinched him a unanimous victory from judges Sung Anh and Paik Jong-won.

After winning Culinary Class Wars, Choi began a new YouTube channel, called Food Otaku, in which he travels Japan to find the best ingredients and food. The show will have six parts.

=== Books ===
In 2023, Choi authored a cookbook titled Choi Kang-rok's Cooking Notes.

In 2025, he authored an essay collection called Cooking For Life.

== Personal life ==
Choi is married. He and his wife have a daughter.
