= Mosu (restaurant) =

Fine dining restaurant

- Interactive map of Mosu

Restaurant information
- Owner: Anh Sung-jae
- Rating: 2 Michelin stars
- Location: 4 Hoenamu-ro 41-gil, Yongsan District, Seoul, South Korea
- Coordinates: 37.5411532°N 126.9961548°E
- Other locations: Hong Kong
- Website: restaurantmosu.com

Mosu (Korean: 모수) is a fine-dining restaurant based in Seoul, South Korea and Hong Kong. It first opened in California, United States in the summer of 2015. It then moved to Seoul and reopened in 2017. It opened a Hong Kong branch on April 21, 2022, and temporarily closed its Seoul location in 2024. It reopened its Seoul branch in Yongsan, Seoul in 2025.

== Description ==
The restaurant derives its name from half of the romanized word kosumosu (코스모스), a Korean reading for the cosmos flower.

The restaurant was founded by Anh Sung-jae, a first generation Korean-American who immigrated to the United States at age 13. He drew upon his experience growing up in California, with the cuisines of not only Korean food, but also Japanese food, French food, and more. The food served in the restaurant is a fusion of Korean and other culinary traditions and ingredients.

After receiving a Michelin star its first year of operation, it closed and began the process of moving to Seoul, South Korea. It opened there in 2017, and received two Michelin stars that year. It opened its Hong Kong branch in 2022.

Its Seoul branch was awarded three Michelin stars for 2023 and 2024, as well as appeared in Asia's 50 Best Restaurants in 2022 and was named The Best Restaurant in Korea 2023. After the conclusion of its partnership with its previous investor, it temporarily closed its Seoul branch in 2024 and is aiming to reopen in 2025 in a new location.

=== Wine substitution incident ===
In April 2026, Mosu came under criticism after a customer said that staff at the restaurant substituted the wine they ordered for another less expensive bottle, while still being charged for the more expensive bottle. Anh Sung-jae later confirmed the account after reviewing security footage and apologized for the incident. The Michelin Guide began an investigation into the matter in June 2026.

== See also ==
- List of Michelin-starred restaurants in South Korea
