= Hasung Lee =

South Korean chef and restaurateur

Hasung Lee (Korean: 이하성) is a South Korean chef and restaurateur. Under the name "Culinary Monster," he was the runner-up in the second season of the Netflix series Culinary Class Wars.

== Education ==
Lee attended university in South Korea, studying hotel culinary arts, and moved to the United States to study at the Culinary Institute of America (CIA).

== Career ==
After graduating, Lee returned to South Korea due to economic troubles in America, after which he ran a food truck in Hwanghak-dong, Seoul with his friends. He then worked at Gramercy Tavern in New York City, Geranium in Copenhagen, and The French Laundry. He also co-founded Atomix, which later earned two Michelin stars.

In 2025, Lee was named the inaugural Nanro Next Fellow by Nanro Academy, an organization intending to promote Korean cuisine around the world. The same year, he participated in Culinary Class Wars season two as a Black Spoon. He reached the finals and lost to White Spoon chef Choi Kangrok.

In early 2026, Lee announced on Netflix Korea's YouTube channel that he would open his own restaurant, Oyatte, in the Murray Hill neighborhood of New York City later in the year. BBC named it one of the most anticipated restaurant openings of the year.

Lee drew criticism for, at times, "speaking harshly" during episodes of Culinary Class Wars.
