= Lee Won-il =

South Korean chef (born 1979)

- Born: December 12, 1979 (age 46); Seoul, South Korea
- Education: University of the Philippines Diliman
- Occupation: Chef

Lee Won-il (Korean: 이원일; born December 12, 1979) is a South Korean chef and television personality. He was a cast member in the variety shows Please Take Care of My Refrigerator (seasons 1-2) and Cook Representative.

== Education ==
Lee lived in Philippines from 2002 until 2008. In 2008, Lee earned a BSc degree in Hotel, Restaurant and Institution Management at the University of the Philippines Diliman in Philippines.

== Career ==
Lee is the former owner and chef of Dear Bread and, as of 2020, owns and operates Lee Won-il Table, a 14-seat restaurant in Hannam-dong, Yongsan District, Seoul.

On August 24, 2020, Lee and his fiancée, television producer Kim Yoo-jin, announced they would be leaving the cast of the MBC TV celebrity-couple reality show Don't Be Jealous. The announcement followed multiple media reports accusing Kim of bullying behavior, including physical abuse, dating back to 2008 and earlier. Kim was a minor at the time the incidents were alleged to have occurred.

== Filmography ==
=== Web shows ===
Year	Title	Role	Notes	Ref.
2019	King of Mask Singer	Contestant (Lee Gye-in)		
2022	Terrace On	Host	with Leeteuk and Chuu	
