= Kkanpunggi =

Korean Chinese fried chicken dish

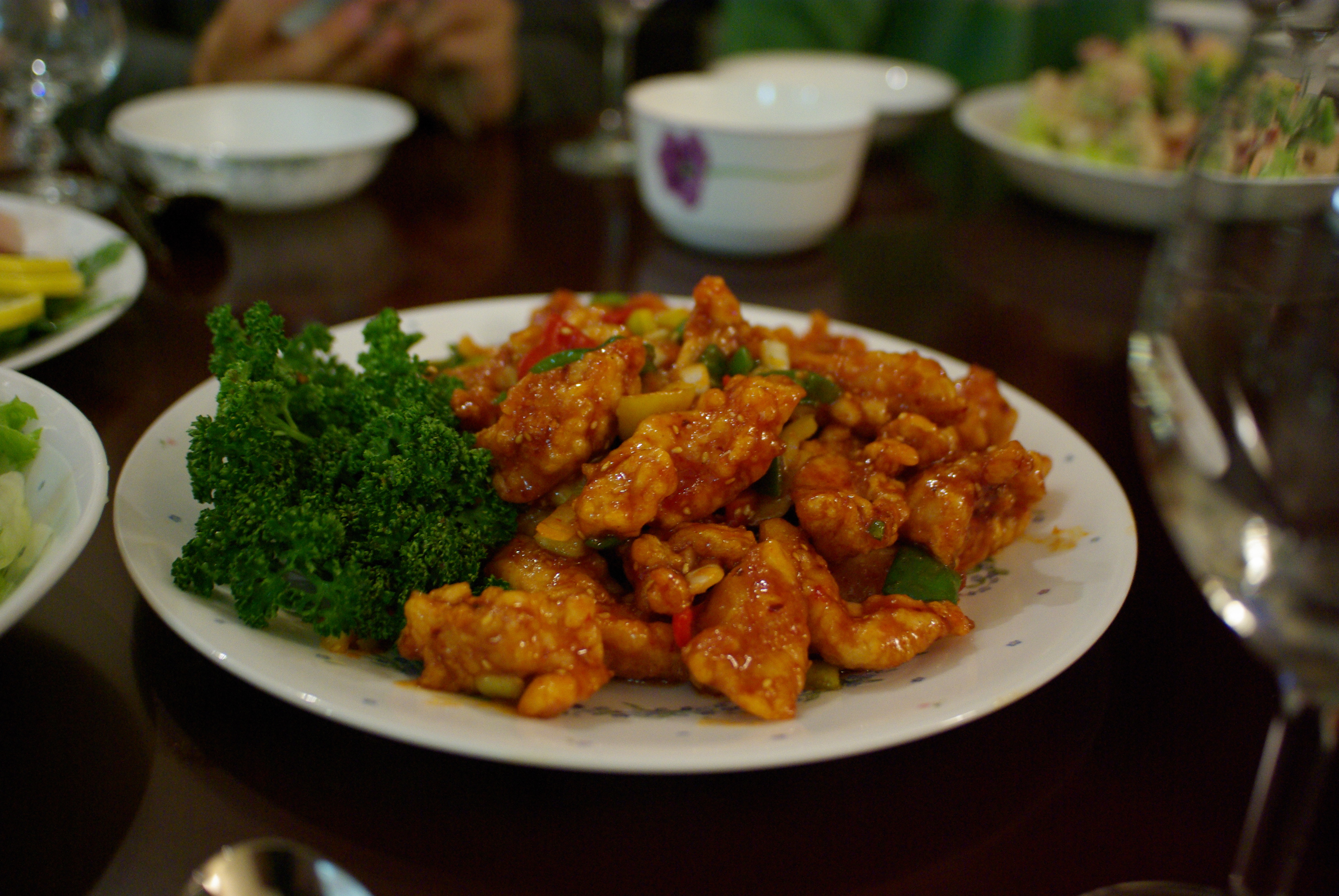
- Region or state: Shandong, China and Korea
- Associated cuisine: Korean Chinese cuisine
- Main ingredients: Chicken

Kkanpunggi (Korean: 깐풍기; Hanja: 乾烹鷄), Hanja reading geonpaenggye (건팽계), is a chicken dish in Korean Chinese cuisine. It is a spicy fried chicken dish, typically covered in a sauce and served with vegetables. It is based on a Chinese dish from Shandong called ganpengji (Chinese: 乾烹鷄). The chicken is often served boneless, although the traditional style may have had bones in it.

The dish has been served in dosirak (pre-packaged meals) and in frozen pre-made packs.
