= Edward Lee (chef) =

American chef (born 1972)

- 이균
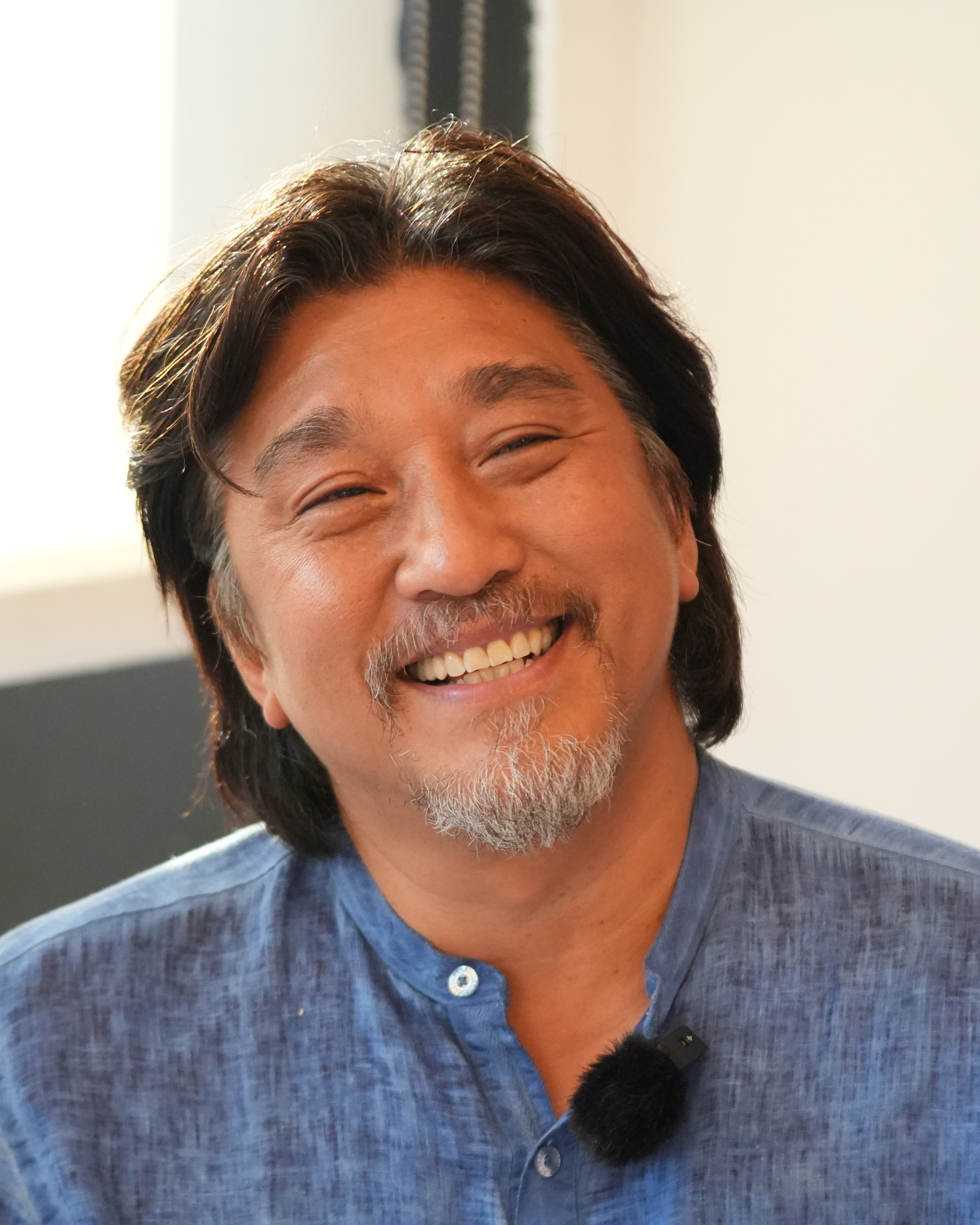
- Lee in 2025
- Born: 1972 (age 53–54); Brooklyn, New York, U.S.
- Education: New York University (BA)
- Spouse: Dianne Lee (m. 2010)
- Children: 1
- Culinary career
- Cooking style: New American; Southern; Korean
- Current restaurants
- Shia; 610 Magnolia; Succotash Prime
- Television show
- Edward Lee's Country Cook (2025)
- Award
- James Beard Foundation Award

Korean name
- Hangul: 이균
- RR: I Gyun
- MR: I Kyun
- Website: chefedwardlee.com

Edward Lee (born July 2, 1972), Korean name Lee Kyun (Korean: 이균), is an American chef, author and restaurateur. He has made numerous television appearances on shows including The Mind of a Chef, Iron Chef America, Top Chef, MasterChef, and Culinary Class Wars. Lee owns multiple restaurants in Louisville, Kentucky and Washington, D.C. and has received several James Beard Foundation Award nominations. In 2019, Lee was awarded the James Beard Foundation Award for his book Buttermilk Graffiti, as well as the James Beard Humanitarian Award for his nonprofit organization, the LEE Initiative, in 2024. Buttermilk Graffiti was recognized for its exploration of immigrant food cultures across the United States and was based on Lee's cross-country travels documenting regional cuisines and personal narratives.

In 2025, Lee starred and hosted the tvN reality show, Edward Lee's Country Cook.The program follows Lee as he travels through rural regions of South Korea, highlighting traditional cooking methods and regional ingredient, and has been noted for its emphasis on cultural heritage and culinary storytelling.

== Early life ==
Lee was born in 1972 in Brooklyn, New York, United States to Korean parents. He began cooking at age 11 and credits his grandmother with first sparking his interest in food. He graduated magna cum laude with a bachelor's degree in literature from New York University. During his early years, Lee has stated that he initially pursued writing before turning to professional cooking, and his background in literature has influenced his narrative approach to food and cookbook writing.

== Career ==
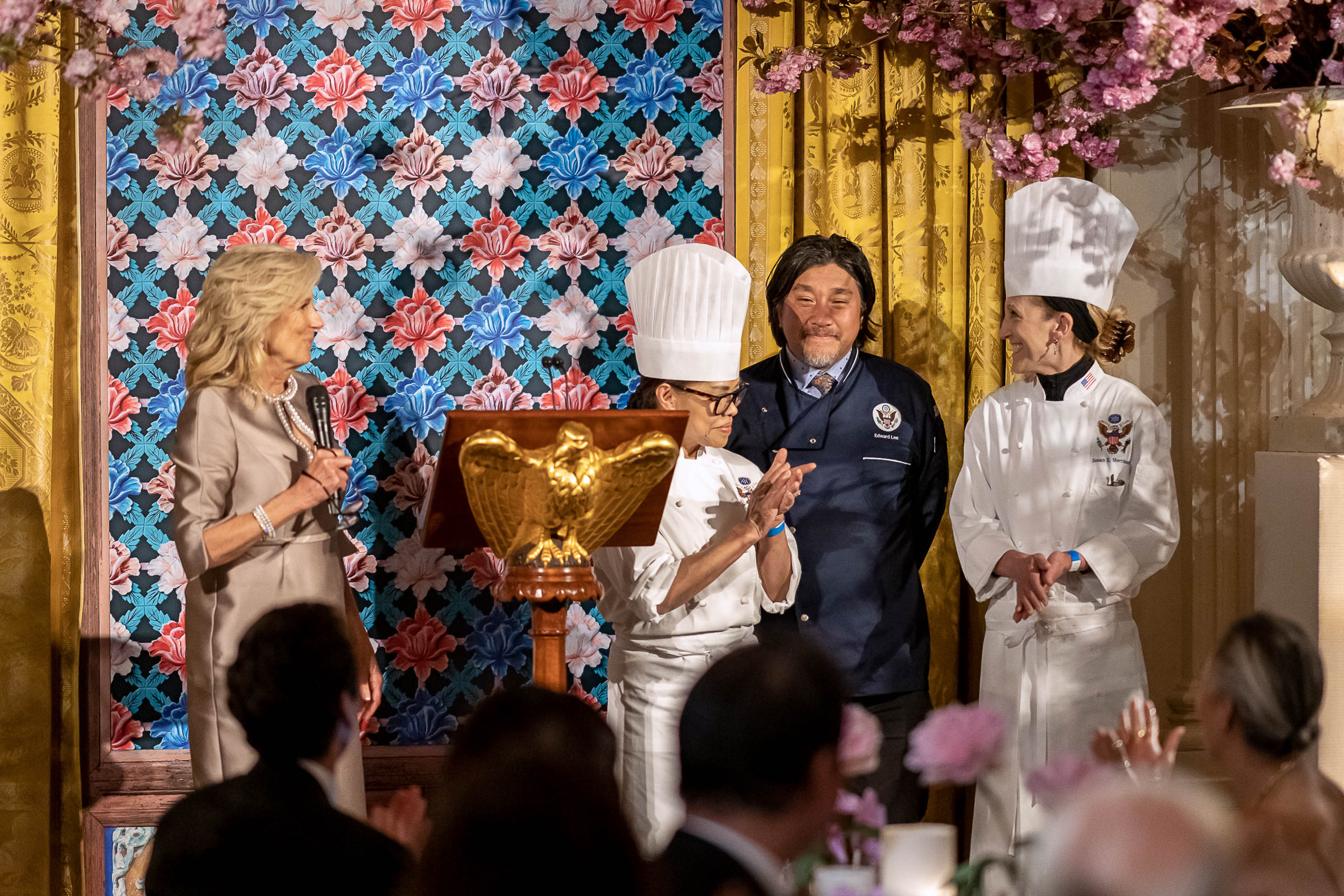
Lee (second from right) presented at the State Dining Room of the White House by First Lady Jill Biden at the April 2023 State Dinner for President Yoon Suk-yeol of South Korea, alongside White House Executive Chef Cristeta Comerford (middle) and pastry chef Susie Morrison (far right) (White House photograph by Adam Schultz)

Lee began cooking professionally at age 22 in a French Moroccan restaurant called Chez Es Saada in the East Village of Manhattan. One summer, he traveled to France and cooked in several restaurants, after which he spent five years learning Korean cuisine, as well as the cuisine of other parts of East Asia and Southeast Asia. His culinary training has been described as largely experiential rather than formal, drawing from apprenticeships and travel.

On a trip to the Kentucky Derby in 2001, Lee fell in love with Louisville and Southern cooking. He moved to the city in 2002 and began working at 610 Magnolia with former chef and owner Eddie Garber. Barely a year after he moved to the city, he became owner of 610 Magnolia. Under Lee's leadership, the restaurant gained national recognition and has been included in lists of notable Southern fine dining establishments.

In 2010, Lee appeared on Season 8 of Iron Chef America. The next year, in 2011, Lee competed on season 9 of Top Chef. He won two elimination challenges and finished fifth in the competition. He was also the host chef featured in the third season of The Mind of a Chef, for which he received a Daytime Emmy nomination for Outstanding Culinary Host. The series, produced by PBS, was noted for combining travel, philosophy, and cooking techniques.

In 2013, Lee published a cookbook, Smoke and Pickles. It received positive reviews from food journalists and other chefs including David Chang and Anthony Bourdain. The next year, in 2014, Lee partnered with YouthBuild and IDEAS 40203 to create a culinary training program based in the Smoketown neighborhood of Louisville. The program trained youth who may not be able to afford expensive culinary schools to work in the restaurant industry. In 2015, Lee's trainees launched a pop-up diner called Smoke & Soul.

In 2017, Lee was the chef judge for the American adaptation of Culinary Genius. The same year, Lee founded the LEE Initiative; Lee is an acronym for "Let's Empower Employment." The Initiative identifies issues surrounding diversity in the restaurant industry and creates solutions to help the restaurant community grow. The initiative includes two programs: Smoke and Soul, and Women Chefs in Kentucky. During the COVID pandemic, the initiative developed the Restaurant Workers Relief Program to support workers laid off by shutdowns. In 2024, the initiative won a James Beard Humanitarian Award.

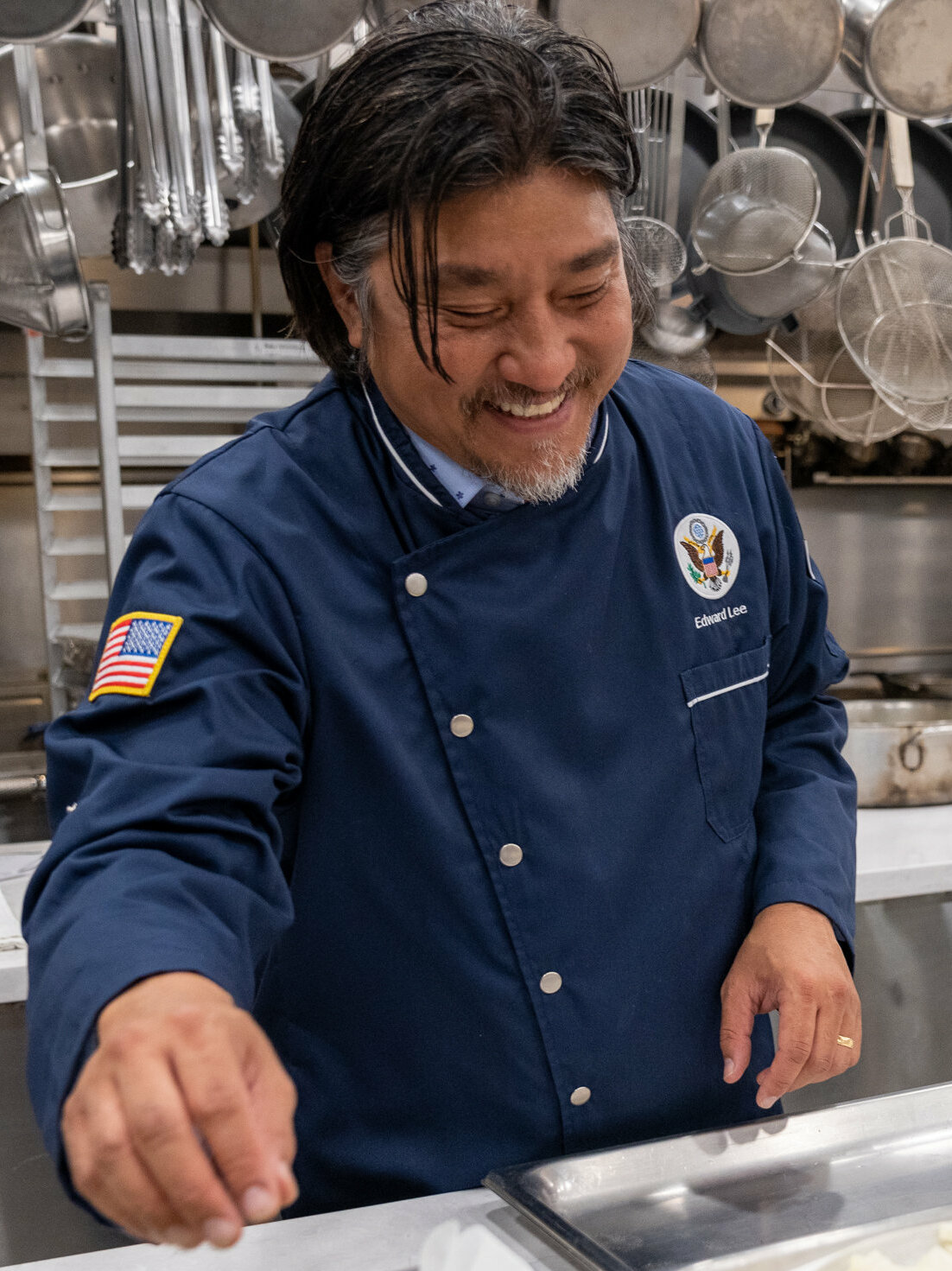
Visiting Chef Edward Lee prepares food in the White House Kitchen on April 26, 2023, for the official State Dinner for the Republic of Korea

In 2023, Lee was selected as the guest chef at the April 26 state dinner at the White House during South Korean president Yoon Suk Yeol's visit to the United States. The menu incorporated both Korean and American culinary elements and was noted as part of broader diplomatic cultural exchange efforts.

In 2024, Lee published his third book, Bourbon Land, which collects several recipes involving bourbon and elaborates its history and regional significance. The same year, Lee participated on the Korean cooking competition show Culinary Class Wars on Netflix, finishing as runner-up. There, he revealed his Korean given name, Kyun, in the finals round after making a dessert inspired by tteokbokki. In December 2024, Lee made an appearance on the reboot of Please Take Care of My Refrigerator.

In January 2025, Lee was awarded the Stepping Stone Award by the Corea Image Communication Institute (CICI) for his ambassadorial efforts in spreading awareness of Korean culture.

On February 14, 2025, Edward Lee's Country Cook, a South Korean travel and food show hosted by Lee, premiered on tvN.

== Cuisine ==
Edward Lee's approach to cooking frequently blends the flavors of his Korean heritage and culinary traditions with the ingredients of the southern United States including sorghum, ham, and bourbon. In The Mind of a Chef, Lee said he believes that food that grows in the same latitude often blends well together, even if the locations are thousands of miles apart. His cuisine has been described by critics as an example of “New Southern” cooking that incorporates immigrant influences.

== Personal life ==
Lee is married to Kentucky native Dianne Durcholz. They have one daughter.

== Restaurants ==
In 1996, Lee opened his first restaurant, Clay, a small Korean restaurant in Manhattan's Nolita neighbourhood serving kalbi. Clay closed following the September 11 attacks.

In Louisville, Lee has owned 610 Magnolia, a modern restaurant specializing in Southern cuisine, since the early 2000s. There, in 2007, Lee opened a venue for special events called the Wine Studio.

Lee also owns Succotash, a restaurant combining Southern and Asian cuisine, the first location of which opened in National Harbor in 2015. Later, in 2017, he opened a second location for Succotash in Washington, D.C. The restaurant has received positive critical attention for its reinterpretation of Southern cuisine through a multicultural lens.

In 2020, Lee closed his Louisville restaurant, Milkwood, and briefly reopened it as McAtee Community Kitchen, named after David McAtee, which helped feed the West End, Shelby Park and Russell neighborhoods in Louisville during the COVID-19 pandemic.

In 2023, Lee opened Nami Modern Korean Steakhouse in Louisville, which was named on USA Today's best restaurants list of 2024. After two years, Nami closed November 26, 2025.

In November 2024, Lee opened a fine dining restaurant in Washington, D.C., Shia, serving Korean American fusion cuisine. Shia is environmentally conscious through sustainable practices such as being plastic-free, designing menus and coasters from leftover paper, and dehydrating waste.

=== Current restaurants ===
- Shia (Washington, D.C.)
- 610 Magnolia (Louisville, KY)
- Succotash Prime (Washington, D.C.)
- Succotash Prime (National Harbor, MD)

=== Previous restaurants ===
- Clay (Manhattan, NY)
- Milkwood (Louisville, KY)
- Whiskey Dry (Louisville, KY)
- Nami Modern Korean Steakhouse (Louisville, KY)

== Selected filmography ==
Year	Title	Role	Notes
2010	Iron Chef America	Himself	2 episodes
2011	Top Chef: Texas	Himself	14 episodes
2014	The Mind of a Chef	Himself	7 Episodes
2017	Culinary Genius	Judge	15 Episodes
2019	Top Chef: Kentucky	Guest judge	1 Episode
2021	The Next Thing You Eat	Himself	Episode: "Restaurants: A Reckoning"
2024	Culinary Class Wars	Himself	12 episodes
2025	Chef & My Fridge	Himself	JTBC network
2025	Edward Lee's Country Cook	Host	tvN
2026	Shh, the Secret Chef (쉿,비밀의 셰프)	Guest	YouTube - ENHYPEN | Ep. 1

== Awards and honors ==
James Beard Foundation Awards

- 2008–2010 James Beard Award for Best Chef Category, Semifinalist
- 2011–2017 James Beard Award for Best Chef Category, Finalist
- 2019 James Beard Award for Best Book of the Year in Writing
- 2024 James Beard Award for Humanitarian of the Year – Awarded to LEE Initiative

Daytime Emmy Awards

- 2015 Daytime Emmy Nomination for Outstanding Culinary Host for his work in The Mind of a Chef

International Association of Culinary Professionals

- 2019 IACP Award for Literary Food Writing, Finalist

Muhammad Ali Humanitarian Awards

- 2021 Muhammad Ali Kentucky Humanitarian Award

Korea Image Awards

- 2025 Stepping Stone Award

== Bibliography ==
Title	Date	ISBN	Ref
Smoke and Pickles: Recipes and Stories from a New Southern Kitchen	May 16, 2013	ISBN 978-1579654924	
Buttermilk Graffiti: A Chef's Journey to Discover America's New Melting-Pot Cuisine	April 17, 2018	ISBN 978-1579657383	
Bourbon Land: A Spirited Love Letter to My Old Kentucky Whiskey, with 50 recipes	April 2, 2024	ISBN 978-1648291531	
