= Please Take Care of My Refrigerator =

South Korean cooking-variety program

- Promotional poster
- Also known as: Chef & My Fridge, Take Care of My Refrigerator, Take Care of the Fridge, Take Care of the Refrigerator, Take Good Care of the Fridge
- Genre: Variety, Cooking
- Directed by: Lee Chang-woo, Jeon Hwi-je, Park Beom-joon, Kang Hong-soo, Lee Chae-rin, Kim Ji-seon
- Presented by: Kim Sung-joo; Ahn Jung-hwan
- Starring: Various chefs and celebrity guests
- Composers: Jung Jin-pil, Oh Soo-kyung
- Country of origin: South Korea
- Original language: Korean
- No. of seasons: 6 (Note: Based on year-end championships)
- No. of episodes: 350 (list of episodes)

Production
- Executive producer: Sung Chi-kyung
- Production location: South Korea
- Cinematography: Jung Woo-cheol, Jung Ji-min, Baek Jong-min, Choi Sung-eun, Lee Choong-woo, Kim Yong-gwan, Jung Dong-yeop
- Editor: Yook Sung-cheol
- Camera setup: Multi-camera
- Running time: 70 minutes
- Production company: Mystic Entertainment

Original release
- Network: JTBC
- Release: November 17, 2014 – present

Please Take Care of My Refrigerator (Korean: 냉장고를 부탁해; RR: Naengjanggoreul butakhae), also known as Chef & My Fridge, is a South Korean cooking-variety program starring various chefs and celebrity guests. It premiered on November 17, 2014 and concluded on November 25, 2019, after five years of broadcast. The show was then rebooted on both television and on Netflix, the first episode aired on December 15, 2024. It currently airs on JTBC on Sundays at 20:50 (KST).

== Format ==
In each episode, two guests have their refrigerators brought to the filming studio. The hosts go through each refrigerator, with the hosts, chefs, and guests commenting on unusual or otherwise notable foods. The hosts will sometimes "help" the guests by throwing away ingredients that are expired. The cast members sometimes sample a dish in the refrigerator. Each guest has four of the eight chefs assigned to them, and each guest presents two categories of food that he or she would like cooked. Examples of categories include Western-style food or a seafood dish that the guest's children would enjoy. Each of the four chefs chooses the category they wish to compete in, with two chefs competing in each category.

The two competing chefs have 15 minutes to cook a dish using ingredients from the guest's refrigerator. Some basic ingredients, like onions, are provided by the show. A host (Kim Sung-joo or Ahn Jung-hwan) will then sample the dishes in the middle of the cooking process and comment on their quality. Starting with the chef who finished cooking their dish first, each chef presents their dish to the guest and then to the remaining cast members. After commentary on the dishes, the guest selects the winner. If the owner can't decide the winner, then all members (hosts, other guests, and non competing chefs) cast the vote to determine the winner. An annual championship is held at the end of each year to determine the champion chef of the season.

In earlier formats, all cast members (hosts, other chefs, and the other guest) voted on the winner, with the chef who finished earlier winning in the event of a draw.

== Hosts ==
=== Main ===
- Kim Sung-joo (episodes 1–350)
- Ahn Jung-hwan (episodes 66–264, 267–350)
- Jeong Hyeong-don (episodes 1–47, 50–55)
- Jeong Ga-eun (episodes 1–9)
- Hwayobi (episodes 1–4)
- Kim Ga-yeon (episodes 5–6)
- Bae Ji-hyun (episode 7)
- Kim Ye-won (episodes 8–9)

=== Special ===
- Chef Choi Hyun-seok & Kim Poong (episodes 48–49)
- Jang Dong-min (episodes 56–57)
- Heo Kyung-hwan (episodes 58–59, 62–63)
- Lee Soo-geun (episodes 60–61)
- Ahn Jung-hwan (episodes 64–65)
- Lee Eun-ji (episodes 265–266)

== Chefs ==
Type	Chef	Total episodes (detail)					
Type	Chef	Season 1 (2014–2016)	Season 2 (2017)	Season 3 (2018)	Season 4 (2019)	Season 5 (2024–2025)	Season 6 (2026)
Main	(Bulgaria) Mihal Ashminov	99 (1–39, 44–49, 52–53, 56–69, 72–99, 102–111)	34 (116–119, 124–137, 140–143, 146–151, 154–157, 160–161)	36 (162–163, 166–169, 174–175, 178–181, 186–209)	6 (210–211, 220–221, 224–225)	(none)	(none)
Main	Choi Hyun-seok	105 (1–19, 22–37, 40–85, 88–111)	16 (112–125)	(none)	(none)	45 (255–260, 263–276, 279–299, 302–307)	38 (308–345)
Main	Hong Seok-cheon	59 (1–23, 26–27, 30–31, 34–43, 46–47, 50–55, 60–61, 64–65, 70–71, 74–75, 78–79, 86–87, 90–91)	(none)	(none)	(none)	(none)	(none)
Main	Joo Bae-an	(none)	4 (112–115)	(none)	(none)	(none)	(none)
Main	Jung Chang-wook	35 (1–31, 34–35, 40–41)	(none)	(none)	(none)	(none)	(none)
Main	Jung Ho-young	50 (50–51, 54–57, 60–61, 64–73, 76–77, 80–99, 102–111)	42 (114–115, 118–123, 126–129, 132–161)	42 (162–167, 170–177, 180–185, 188–209)	44 (210–253)	36 (255–258, 261–262, 267–270, 277-278, 281-284, 287–296, 298–307)	40 (308–347)
Main	Jung Ji-seon	(none)	(none)	8 (164–167, 170–171, 176–177)	(none)	15 (260–261, 271-272, 277–280, 283-284, 289-290, 293–294, 297)	(none)
Main	Tony Jung	(none)	(none)	6 (168–171, 178–179)	(none)	(none)	(none)
Main	Kim Hyung-seok	(none)	(none)	4 (182–185)	(none)	(none)	(none)
Main	Kim Poong	111 (1–111)	50 (112–161)	48 (162–209)	44 (210–253) (255–262)	53 (255–307)	40 (308–347)
Main	(Canada) (South Korea) Raymon Kim	4 (100–101, 104–105)	40 (112–117, 120–121, 124–125, 128–133, 138–161)	48 (162–209)	44 (210–253)	(none)	(none)
Main	Sam Kim	109 (1–21, 24–111)	48 (112–115, 118–161)	48 (162–209)	44 (210–253)	35 (257–260, 263–270, 283-294, 297-307)	40 (308–347)
Main	Kim Seung-min (MasterChef Korea Season 1's winner)	(none)	(none)	(none)	12 (212–223)	(none)	(none)
Main	Lee Chan-oh	42 (38–39, 42–59, 62–83)	(none)	(none)	(none)	(none)	(none)
Main	Lee Jae-hoon	2 (100–101)	28 (112–119, 124–127, 130–131, 134–145, 152–153)	(none)	(none)	(none)	(none)
Main	Lee Won-il	56 (10–29, 32–45, 48–49, 52–55, 58–59, 62–63, 68–69, 84–85, 88–89, 92–93, 106–107, 110–111)	12 (122–123, 126–127, 132–135, 144–145, 154–155)	(none)	(none)	(none)	(none)
Main	Lee Yeon-bok	82 (20–25, 28–29, 32–35, 38–53, 56–91, 94–111)	50 (112–161)	46 (162–169, 172–209)	42 (210–219, 222–253)	10 (255–264)	(none)
Main	Maeng Gi-yong	6 (28–33)	(none)	(none)	(none)	(none)	(none)
Main	Oh Se-deuk	66 (36–37, 40–43, 46–63, 66–67, 70–99, 102–111)	24 (116–117, 122–123, 128–129, 136–139, 146–153, 156–161)	42 (162–165, 168–171, 174–201, 204–209)	44 (210–253)	(none)	(none)
Main	Park Geon-young	(none)	4 (112–113, 120–121)	(none)	(none)	(none)	(none)
Main	Park Joon-woo	30 (10–27, 30–33, 36–39, 44–45, 52–53)	(none)	(none)	(none)	(none)	(none)
Main	Song Hoon	(none)	(none)	(none)	28 (226–253)	(none)	(none)
Main	Yoo Hyun-soo	(none)	46 (116–161)	48 (162–209)	44 (210–253)	(none)	(none)
Main	Choi Kang-rok	(none)	(none)	(none)	(none)	16 (255–270)	2 (317–318)
Main	(Korea) (United States) Edward Lee	(none)	(none)	(none)	(none)	6 (255–256, 261–262, 285–286)	4 (319–320, 346–347)
Main	(Italy) Fabrizio Ferrari	(none)	(none)	(none)	(none)	15 (271-282, 297–299)	(none)
Main	Im Tae-hoon	(none)	(none)	(none)	(none)	13 (277–280, 285–286, 293–299)	(none)
Main	Kwon Sung-jun	(none)	(none)	(none)	(none)	48 (257–284, 287–296, 298–307)	40 (308–347)
Main	Lee Moon-jung	(none)	(none)	(none)	(none)	(none)	12 (328–337, 342–343)
Main	Park Eun-yeong	(none)	(none)	(none)	(none)	32 (255–258, 261–262, 271-274, 281-282, 285–288, 291–296, 298–307)	38 (308–329), (332–347)
Main	Son Jong-won	(none)	(none)	(none)	(none)	39 (259–270, 275-276, 283-307)	40 (308–347)
Main	Yoon Nam-no	(none)	(none)	(none)	(none)	44 (263–296, 298–307)	36 (308–327, 330–331, 334–347)
Special	(Italy) Antimo Maria Merone	(none)	(none)	(none)	(none)	4 (275–276, 300-301)	(none)
Special	(Japan) Motokawa Atsushi	2 (98–99)	(none)	2 (172–173)	(none)	(none)	(none)
Special	Baek Seung-wook	2 (108–109)	(none)	(none)	(none)	(none)	(none)
Special	Bae Kyung-jun	(none)	(none)	(none)	(none)	6 (271-274, 281-282)	(none)
Special	(United States) Rupert Blease	(none)	(none)	2 (172–173)	(none)	(none)	(none)
Special	Choi Hyung-jin	2 (100–101)	(none)	(none)	(none)	(none)	(none)
Special	Choi Seok-yi	(none)	(none)	2 (186–187)	(none)	(none)	(none)
Special	(Singapore) Han Li Guang	(none)	(none)	(none)	(none)	2 (275–276)	(none)
Special	Han Sang-hoon (former Blue House's chef)	2 (94–95)	(none)	(none)	(none)	(none)	(none)
Special	Jang Keun-suk	(none)	(none)	(none)	(none)	2 (275–276)	(none)
Special	(Australia) Joseph Lidgerwood	(none)	(none)	(none)	(none)	2 (273-274)	(none)
Special	Kim Min-jun	2 (100–101)	2 (130–131)	(none)	(none)	(none)	(none)
Special	Kim Seon-yeop	(none)	(none)	(none)	(none)	(none)	2 (332–333)
Special	Kim Si-hyeon	(none)	(none)	(none)	(none)	(none)	2 (314–315)
Special	Kim Sohyi	(none)	(none)	(none)	(none)	4 (265–266, 277–278)	(none)
Special	Lee Mi-young	(none)	(none)	(none)	(none)	2 (255–256)	(none)
Special	Lee Sang-min	2 (86–87)	(none)	(none)	(none)	(none)	(none)
Special	(Japan) (South Korea) Park Ri-hye (Park Chan-ho's wife)	2 (96–97)	(none)	(none)	(none)	(none)	(none)
Special	(Italy) Ciro Petrone	(none)	(none)	2 (172–173)	(none)	(none)	(none)
Special	(United Kingdom) Gordon Ramsay	(none)	2 (158–159)	(none)	(none)	(none)	(none)
Special	(United Arab Emirates) Benjamin Wan	(none)	(none)	2 (172–173)	(none)	(none)	(none)
Special	Woo Do-hee	(none)	(none)	(none)	(none)	(none)	2 (332–333)
Special	Yeo Kyung-rae	2 (102–103)	(none)	(none)	(none)	4 (279–280, 298–299)	(none)
Special	Yoo Chang-joon (Seungyeon and Jeongyeon's father)	2 (92–93)	(none)	(none)	(none)	(none)	(none)
Special	(Japan) Yusuke Takada	(none)	(none)	(none)	(none)	2 (275–276)	(none)
Special	(North Korea) Yun Jong Chŏl	(none)	(none)	2 (202–203)	(none)	(none)	(none)
Special	Yoo Yong-wook	(none)	(none)	(none)	(none)	(none)	4 (334–337)

== Ratings ==
In the ratings below, the highest rating for the show will be in red, and the lowest rating for the show will be in blue each year.

- Ratings released by AGB Nielsen Korean and TNMS.

=== 2014 ===
List of ratings in 2014 (Episodes 1–7)

Episode #	Broadcast Date	AGB Ratings	TNMS Ratings
1	November 17	1.789%	—
2	November 24	1.916%	—
3	December 1	2.633%	—
4	December 8	2.082%	—
5	December 15	1.971%	—
6	December 22	2.044%	—
7	December 29	2.052%	—

=== 2015 ===
List of ratings in 2015 (Episodes 8–59)

Episode #	Broadcast Date	AGB Ratings	TNMS Ratings
8	January 5	1.969%	—
9	January 12	2.221%	—
10	January 19	2.986%	—
11	January 26	2.307%	—
12	February 2	2.947%	—
13	February 9	2.720%	—
14	February 16	3.256%	—
15	February 23	3.428%	—
16	March 2	3.211%	—
17	March 9	3.591%	—
18	March 16	2.921%	—
19	March 23	3.042%	—
20	March 30	3.331%	—
21	April 6	2.671%	—
22	April 13	3.556%	—
23	April 20	4.025%	—
24	April 27	3.925%	—
25	May 4	3.539%	4.6%
26	May 11	3.981%	3.5%
27	May 18	3.722%	3.9%
28	May 25	4.283%	3.9%
29	June 1	4.087%	4.3%
30	June 8	4.615%	5.0%
31	June 15	4.658%	4.4%
32	June 22	4.943%	5.1%
33	June 29	4.657%	5.1%
34	July 6	5.451%	5.8%
35	July 13	5.196%	6.0%
36	July 20	6.365%	6.1%
37	July 27	5.363%	5.2%
38	August 3	5.216%	5.5%
39	August 10	5.445%	5.9%
40	August 17	5.349%	5.7%
41	August 24	5.325%	5.5%
42	August 31	7.429%	6.2%
43	September 7	5.961%	—
44	September 14	4.928%	5.7%
45	September 21	4.343%	5.2%
46	September 28	5.195%	5.6%
47	October 5	4.489%	3.4%
48	October 12	4.120%	4.5%
49	October 19	3.950%	3.9%
50	October 26	5.272%	4.9%
51	November 2	4.728%	4.8%
52	November 9	5.500%	6.0%
53	November 16	4.662%	4.6%
54	November 23	4.267%	4.3%
55	November 30	4.015%	3.8%
56	December 7	4.279%	3.3%
57	December 14	4.483%	3.6%
58	December 21	3.917%	3.8%
59	December 28	4.126%	3.6%

=== 2016 ===
List of ratings in 2016 (Episodes 60–111)

Episode #	Broadcast Date	AGB Ratings	TNMS Ratings
60	January 4	4.348%	4.0%
61	January 11	3.981%	4.4%
62	January 18	5.222%	4.8%
63	January 25	4.846%	4.4%
64	February 1	4.871%	4.7%
65	February 8	3.901%	—
66	February 15	4.907%	—
67	February 22	5.099%	—
68	February 29	4.778%	—
69	March 7	3.888%	—
70	March 14	4.143%	—
71	March 21	4.058%	—
72	March 28	4.284%	—
73	April 4	3.747%	—
74	April 11	3.238%	—
75	April 18	3.730%	—
76	April 25	3.757%	—
77	May 2	4.156%	3.9%
78	May 9	3.527%	—
79	May 16	3.813%	—
80	May 23	3.959%	—
81	May 30	3.600%	—
82	June 6	4.145%	4.0%
83	June 13	3.203%	—
84	June 20	3.185%	3.1%
85	June 27	2.613%	2.7%
86	July 4	3.038%	3.0%
87	July 11	2.775%	3.4%
88	July 18	2.837%	3.4%
89	July 25	2.992%	3.9%
90	August 1	3.286%	3.2%
91	August 8	2.686%	3.2%
92	August 15	3.126%	4.0%
93	August 22	3.223%	3.8%
94	August 29	3.199%	3.5%
95	September 5	3.579%	3.1%
96	September 12	3.347%	3.8%
97	September 19	2.847%	2.9%
98	September 26	2.969%	3.0%
99	October 3	3.094%	2.8%
100	October 10	3.073%	3.7%
101	October 17	3.053%	3.8%
102	October 24	3.554%	3.2%
103	October 31	4.520%	4.8%
104	November 7	4.423%	4.6%
105	November 14	4.759%	5.9%
106	November 21	4.417%	5.2%
107	November 28	4.024%	4.9%
108	December 5	3.951%	4.2%
109	December 12	3.561%	3.5%
110	December 19	4.107%	4.1%
111	December 26	3.912%	4.3%

=== 2017 ===
List of ratings in 2017 (Episodes 112–161)

Episode #	Broadcast Date	AGB Ratings	TNMS Ratings
112	January 2	4.145%	4.6%
113	January 9	3.747%	3.5%
114	January 16	4.064%	3.7%
115	January 23	4.058%	4.5%
116	January 30	3.891%	3.8%
117	February 6	3.340%	3.1%
118	February 13	3.369%	3.1%
119	February 20	3.352%	2.9%
120	February 27	3.254%	3.0%
121	March 13	3.304%	3.4%
122	March 20	3.359%	3.4%
123	March 27	3.0%	3.5%
124	April 3	3.193%	3.5%
125	April 10	3.351%	3.6%
126	April 17	3.791%	4.0%
127	April 24	3.669%	4.4%
128	May 1	3.386%	3.4%
129	May 8	3.372%	3.5%
130	May 15	3.720%	3.9%
131	May 22	3.391%	3.2%
132	May 29	3.502%	3.8%
133	June 5	3.773%	3.3%
134	June 12	4.280%	4.4%
135	June 19	3.985%	4.0%
136	June 26	4.423%	4.1%
137	July 3	3.594%	3.9%
138	July 10	4.156%	4.2%
139	July 17	3.959%	4.1%
140	July 24	3.804%	4.8%
141	July 31	5.039%	5.2%
142	August 7	4.203%	4.9%
143	August 14	4.840%	4.6%
144	August 21	4.028%	4.4%
145	August 28	4.049%	4.3%
146	September 4	3.524%	4.6%
147	September 11	4.441%	4.4%
148	September 18	3.879%	4.3%
149	September 25	4.398%	4.6%
150	October 9	4.635%	4.0%
151	October 16	4.034%	4.1%
152	October 23	3.985%	3.5%
153	October 30	3.133%	3.1%
154	November 6	3.791%	4.3%
155	November 13	3.654%	3.9%
156	November 20	4.438%	4.6%
157	November 27	3.667%	4.1%
158	December 4	4.207%	4.7%
159	December 11	5.936%	5.8%
160	December 18	5.284%	4.8%
161	December 25	5.816%	5.1%

=== 2018 ===
List of ratings in 2018 (Episodes 162–209)

Episode #	Broadcast Date	AGB Ratings	TNMS Ratings
162	January 1	6.828%	5.7%
163	January 8	5.634%	4.9%
164	January 15	4.791%	5.1%
165	January 22	4.765%	4.8%
166	January 29	5.453%	4.9%
167	February 5	5.200%	5.6%
168	February 12	4.800%	4.8%
169	February 19	4.373%	4.4%
170	February 26	4.729%	4.9%
171	March 5	5.084%	5.4%
172	March 12	5.165%	5.6%
173	March 19	4.601%	5.6%
174	March 26	4.252%	5.0%
175	April 2	3.841%	4.5%
176	April 9	3.583%	5.0%
177	April 16	4.768%	5.2%
178	April 23	5.160%	5.4%
179	April 30	4.000%	4.4%
180	May 7	3.765%	4.4%
181	May 14	3.887%	4.6%
182	May 21	3.449%	4.1%
183	May 28	3.879%	4.5%
184	June 11	4.196%	4.0%
185	June 25	3.941%	4.8%
186	July 2	5.384%	5.9%
187	July 9	4.671%	—
188	July 16	3.856%	4.6%
189	July 23	3.659%	4.1%
190	July 30	4.479%	5.3%
191	August 6	4.000%	4.6%
192	August 13	4.365%	5.4%
193	August 20	4.140%	—
194	September 3	4.761%	—
195	September 10	3.969%	—
196	September 17	3.490%	4.2%
197	October 1	2.195%	2.2%
198	October 8	2.472%	—
199	October 15	2.6%	—
200	October 22	2.571%	—
201	October 29	3.487%	3.4%
202	November 5	2.663%	—
203	November 12	2.2%	—
204	November 19	2.1%	—
205	November 26	2.1%	—
206	December 3	2.1%	2.4%
207	December 10	2.878%	—
208	December 17	2.686%	2.5%
209	December 24	2.545%	—

=== 2019 ===
List of ratings in 2019 (Episodes 210–254)

Episode #	Broadcast Date	AGB Ratings
210	January 14	2.4%
211	January 21	2.3%
212	January 28	2.1%
213	February 11	2.3%
214	February 18	2.3%
215	February 25	2.0%
216	March 4	3.414%
217	March 11	2.9%
218	March 18	2.0%
219	March 25	2.4%
220	April 1	1.9%
221	April 8	2.0%
222	April 15	2.0%
223	April 22	2.5%
224	April 29	2.6%
225	May 6	1.9%
226	May 13	2.5%
227	May 20	3.009%
228	May 27	2.7%
229	June 3	1.8%
230	June 10	2.3%
231	June 17	1.8%
232	June 24	2.0%
233	July 1	2.0%
234	July 8	2.0%
235	July 15	2.3%
236	July 22	2.4%
237	July 29	2.1%
238	August 5	2.3%
239	August 12	2.1%
240	August 19	1.9%
241	August 26	1.9%
242	September 2	1.7%
243	September 9	2.2%
244	September 16	1.9%
245	September 23	2.6%
246	September 30	2.1%
247	October 7	2.3%
248	October 14	1.5%
249	October 21	1.7%
250	October 28	1.8%
251	November 4	1.8%
252	November 11	2.4%
253	November 18	2.3%
254	November 25	1.9%

=== 2024–2025 ===
List of ratings in 2024–2025 (Episodes 255–307)

Episode #	Broadcast Date	AGB Ratings
255	December 15	5.225%
256	December 22	3.773%
257	January 5	4.163%
258	January 12	3.740%
259	January 19	3.673%
260	January 26	3.285%
261	February 2	3.026%
262	February 9	2.666%
263	February 16	3.012%
264	February 23	2.493%
265	March 2	2.778%
266	March 9	2.778%
267	March 16	2.329%
268	March 23	2.755%
269	March 30	2.881%
270	April 6	2.865%
271	April 13	2.590%
272	April 20	2.396%
273	April 27	2.121%
274	May 4	2.231%
275	May 11	1.881%
276	May 18	2.685%
277	May 25	2.316%
278	June 1	1.840%
279	June 8	2.678%
280	June 15	2.413%
281	June 22	1.671%
282	June 29	1.972%
283	July 6	1.821%
284	July 13	2.025%
285	July 20	2.372%
286	July 27	2.085%
287	August 3	2.098%
288	August 10	2.260%
289	August 17	2.4%
290	August 24	2.092%
291	August 31	2.499%
292	September 7	1.810%
293	September 14	1.359%
294	September 21	1.263%
295	September 28	1.387%
296	October 6	8.861%
297	October 12	2.013%
298	October 19	2.105%
299	October 26	1.688%
300	November 2	1.782%
301	November 9	2.086%
302	November 23	2.387%
303	November 30	2.042%
304	December 7	1.753%
305	December 14	1.589%
306	December 21	1.704%
307	December 28	2.251%

=== 2026 ===
List of ratings in 2026 (Episodes 308–350)

Episode #	Broadcast Date	AGB Ratings
308	January 4	2.433%
309	January 11	2.173%
310	January 18	2.243%
311	January 25	1.708%
312	February 1	2.523%
313	February 15	3.820%
314	March 1	2.140%
315	March 8	2.158%
316	March 15	2.617%
317	March 22	2.103%
318	March 29	2.808%
319	April 5	2.804%
320	April 12	2.337%
321	April 19	2.161%
322	April 26	2.131%
323	May 3	2.167%
324	May 10	2.198%
325	May 17	2.069%
326	May 24	1.809%
327	May 31	1.628%
328	June 7	2.558%
329	June 14	2.785%
330	June 21	2.795%
331	June 28	2.617%
332	July 5	2.669%
333	July 12	2.259%
334	July 19	2.291%
335	July 26	2.210%
336	August 2	1.651%
337	August 9	1.785%
338	August 16	2.030%
339	August 23	1.764%
340	August 30	2.200%
341	September 6	1.841%
342	September 13	2.327%
343	September 20	2.462%
344	September 27	1.768%
345	October 4	1.516%
346	October 11	1.730%
347	October 18	1.895%
348	October 25	1.734%
349	November 1	2.098%
350	November 8	2.036%
351	November 15	2.0%

Note: This program airs on a cable channel/pay TV which normally has a relatively smaller audience compared to free-to-air TV/public broadcasters (KBS, SBS, MBC and EBS).

== Cancellation of broadcasting ==
Date	Scheduled episode	Reason	Notes/References
June 4, 2018	184		
June 18, 2018	185	Sweden vs South Korea (2018 FIFA World Cup Group F)	A special episode was aired instead
August 27, 2018	194		
January 7, 2019	210	South Korea vs Philippines (2019 AFC Asian Cup Group C)	
November 16, 2025	302		A special episode was aired instead
February 8, 2026	313	2026 Winter Olympics	
February 22, 2026	314	2026 Winter Olympics	

== Awards and nominations ==
Year	Award	Category	Recipient	Result
2016	10th Cable TV Broadcasting Awards	VOD Grand Prize (Daesang), Variety Category	Please Take Care of My Refrigerator	Won
2016	10th Cable TV Broadcasting Awards	Hot Issue Entertainer Award	Choi Hyun-seok	Won
2026	Brand Customer Loyalty Awards	Food Variety Show	Please Take Care of My Refrigerator	Won

== International versions ==
– Currently airing
– Ceased to air
– Undetermined

Country/Region	Local title	Network(s)	Broadcast period	Hosts	Chefs
China	Go Fridge (拜託了冰箱)	Tencent Video; Zhejiang TV	Season 1: December 3, 2015 – February 3, 2016; Season 2: May 18, 2016 – July 27, 2016; Season 3: April 12, 2017 – June 15, 2017; Season 4: April 25, 2018 – June 27, 2018; Season 5: April 10, 2019 – June 12, 2019; Season 6: April 28, 2020 – June 30, 2020; Season 7: June 21, 2021 – August 24, 2021	Former: He Jiong (Hong Kong) Jackson Wang	Former: Tian Shu (1–4); Huang Yan (1–4); An Xianmin (1–5) (United States) Jeffrey Chen (3–4); Yao Weitao (1–4); Hu Shasha (1–4); Laura Luo (4); Li Yang (4); Liu Kaile (1–3, 5)
Vietnam	Please Take Care of My Refrigerator Vietnam (Cuộc chiến mỹ vị)	VTV3	Season 1: January 8, 2018 – July 10, 2018	Former: (South Korea) Will (1); An Nguy (1); Minh Xù (1); Phí Linh (1)	Former: (France) (United States) Vũ Dino (1); Sĩ Toàn (1); Hoàng Nhân (1); Ngọc Anh (1)
