= Raymon Kim =

South Korean-Canadian chef (born 1975)

- Born: May 5, 1975 (age 51); Seoul, South Korea
- Spouse: Kim Ji-woo (m. 2013)
- Culinary career
- Current restaurant
- Table on the Moon

Raymon Kim (Korean: 레이먼 킴; born May 5, 1975) is a South Korean-Canadian chef and television personality. He was a former cast member of the variety show Law of the Jungle in Indochina (episodes 154 – 162). He also hosted Sam and Raymon Cooking Time from 2011 to 2012 with Sam Kim.
