= Capsosiphon =

Scientific classification
- Kingdom: Plantae
- Division: Chlorophyta
- Class: Ulvophyceae
- Order: Ulotrichales
- Family: Ulotrichaceae
- Genus: Capsosiphon; Gobi

Species
- Capsosiphon fulvescens

Synonyms
- Capsosiphon Gobi

Genus of algae

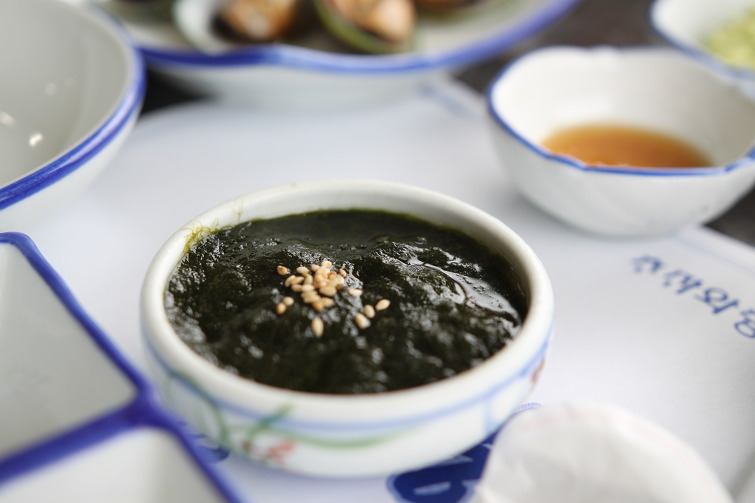
Maesaengi (Capsosiphon fulvescens) as banchan (side dish)

Capsosiphon is a genus of green algae in the family Ulotrichaceae.

== Effect ==
Calcium and iron are particularly abundant in the mesophyll, with 20.6% of the protein, 0.5% of the fat, 35.4% of the carbohydrate, 1.5% of the fiber and 22.7% of the mineral. The dried product is crude protein 4.6% ~ 6.6%, crude fat 1.1 ~ 1.4%, crude fiber 2.5 ~ 4.2%, ash 28.6 ~ 49.2% and soluble nitrogen free 40.9 ~ 60.9%. It contains a large amount of calcium and iron.
