= Sung Anh =

South Korean chef (born 1982)

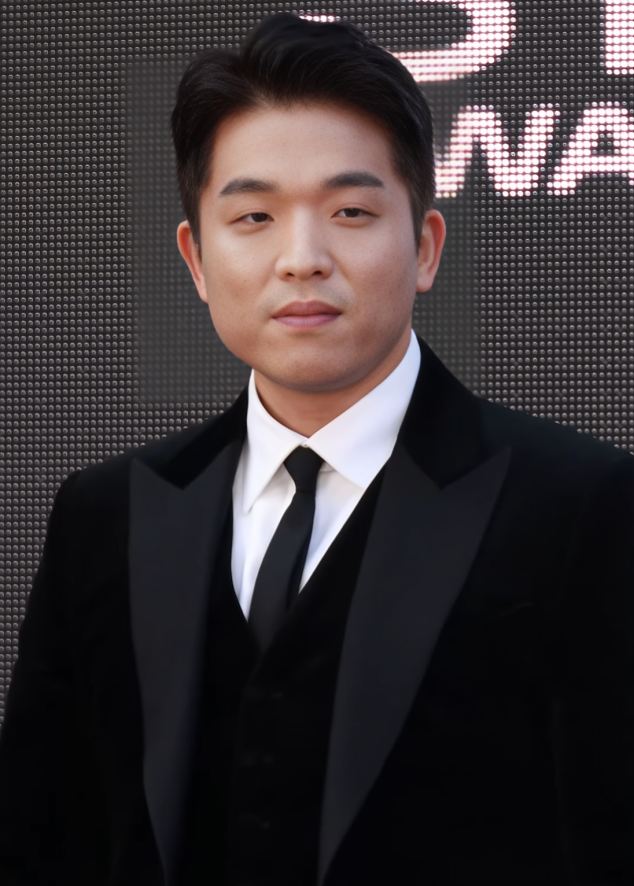
- Anh in October 2024
- Born: 1982 (age 43–44)
- Education: Le Cordon Bleu College of Culinary Arts Los Angeles
- Spouse: Amy Anh (m. 2012)
- Children: 2
- Culinary career
- Cooking style: East Asian; French
- Current restaurants
- Mosu Seoul; Mosu Hong Kong
- Television show
- Culinary Class Wars

Korean name
- Hangul: 안성재
- RR: An Seongjae
- MR: An Sŏngjae

Sung Anh, also known as Anh Sung-jae (Korean: 안성재), is a South Korean and American chef. His restaurant, Mosu, was awarded three Michelin stars for 2023 and 2024. He is one of the two judges for the Netflix cooking contest Culinary Class Wars.

== Early life and education ==
Anh was born in South Korea and moved to the United States in 1993 at the age of 12. He grew up in California where his parents ran a Panda Express Chinese fast-food restaurant. He enlisted in the US Army after high school, and after the September 11 attacks and the start of the Iraq War, asked to serve in Iraq. Anh served as a petroleum supply specialist, where he helped fuel combat vehicles like helicopters and tanks. After his Army service, Anh was set to attend mechanic school to become a Porsche mechanic. After seeing a group of culinary school students walk by in chef coats, Anh changed course and enrolled in culinary school.

== Culinary career ==
After graduating from culinary school, Anh began working at Urasawa, where he washed dishes after volunteering to work without pay. Within a month, Anh was working closely with the head chef and owner, and was working behind the counter. He then moved to work for chef Corey Lee, the head chef at The French Laundry, a Michelin three star restaurant. Lee then placed Anh at another of his restaurants, Benu, which also had a Michelin three stars rating.

In 2016, Anh left Benu and founded his own restaurant in San Francisco, Mosu. The restaurant earned one Michelin star in its first year, despite a review from the San Francisco Chronicle's Michael Bauer that felt the food was "still in the development stage" and commented on its high initial price. Mosu was consistently booked during its run in the city.

After a year of operating Mosu in the United States, Anh decided to move the restaurant to Seoul, South Korea. Upon opening Mosu in Korea, he priced the menu 30% higher than the city's previous most expensive multi-course meal, and it earned three Michelin stars in 2023, the only restaurant in South Korea with the distinction. In 2024, Mosu announced its temporary closure, with Anh saying to The Chosun Daily about his coordination with CJ Group, his investment partner in the restaurant, "Our visions didn't align, so I decided to part ways. I'm currently working on a new restaurant with a different partner, not a large corporation, that better matches my vision."

His style of fine dining is a fusion of Asian cooking with Korean fermented ingredients presented in the classic mode of French haute cuisine. In 2024, he won a Chefs' Choice Award – an accolade of his peers across Asia.
