= Choi Hyun-seok =

South Korean chef (born 1972)

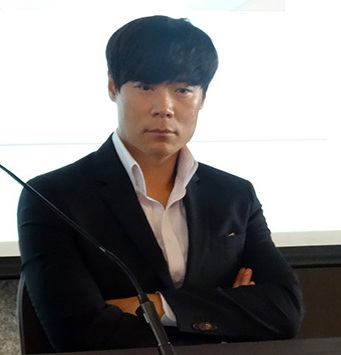
- Choi in 2015
- Born: July 6, 1972 (age 54); Seoul, South Korea
- Culinary career
- Cooking style: Korean-European fusion
- Current restaurants
- Choi; Central Reducer
- Television shows
- Please Take Care of My Refrigerator; Culinary Class Wars

Korean name
- Hangul: 최현석
- Hanja: 崔鉉碩
- RR: Choe Hyeonseok
- MR: Ch'oe Hyŏnsŏk

Choi Hyun-seok (Korean: 최현석; born July 6, 1972) is a South Korean chef and television personality. He gained mainstream recognition for his appearances on the variety show Please Take Care of My Refrigerator, from which he became known for his flamboyant stage presence.

== Career ==
He worked in Seoul in the Italian restaurant La Cucina before becoming the head chef at Elbon the Table, which has two branches in Seoul and one in Goyang.

He is currently the head chef at Choi, a Korean-European fusion restaurant in Seoul. In 2020, he opened his new restaurant Central Reducer (중앙감속기).

In 2024, he appeared on the competitive cooking show Culinary Class Wars and made it to the final eight contestants.

On March 23rd and 24th, 2025, Chef Choi Hyun-suk, joined Seoul Gourmet Pop-up at Solbit Island in Banpo. It was hosted by the Seoul Metropolitan Government to celebrate the second consecutive year of hosting Asia's 50 Best Restaurants. Choi, along with other star chefs, presented signature dishes paired with traditional liquor cocktails.

== Filmography ==
Year	Title	Role	Notes
2010	The Table by Choi Hyun-seok	Cast	
2011	Olive Cooking Time	Cast	
2011	Chef Choi Hyun-seok's Crazy Time Season 1	Cast	
2011	Chef Choi Hyun-seok's Crazy Time Season 2	Cast	
2014	Olive Show	Cast	Season 2014
2014	Korean Food Battle 2	Judges	
2014-2016	Please Take Care of My Refrigerator	Main Cast	Season 1
2015	Wednesday Gourmet Club	Advisory Board	
2015	Olive Show	Cast	Season 2015
2015	Korean Food Battle 3	Judges	
2015	The human condition	Cast	3rd period
2015	Chefs together	Cast	
2016	Olive Show	Cast	Season 2016
2016	Cook's representative	Participant	
2016	Chefs 2	Cast	
2017	Please Take Care of My Refrigerator	Main Cast	Season 2
2017	Long live the independence of the old men!! See you there	Cast	
2017	Man giving dog food 2	Cast	
2018	Sumine's side dishes	Student	
2018	Law of the Jungle in Mexico	Cast	
2018	Delicious story dirty talk	Cast	
2018	Delicious story dirty talk	Cast	
2019	Extreme Table	Cast	
2019	Strange Village	Cast	
2023	Challenge! Michelin iChef	Cast	
2024	Culinary Class Wars	Participant	White Spoon
2024-2025	Please Take Care of My Refrigerator	Main Cast	Season 5
2025	Jungle Bob 2 - Peruvian Bob	Cast	

== Book ==
- Chef Choi's Crazy Recipe (2010)
- Art food by the 5 elements of cooking (2013)
- Monography Magazine 01 (2015)
- Camera and Apron (2015)
- Great Library Job Show
- Sumine's Side Dishes

== Award ==
Year	Award Ceremony	Category	Result
2015	The 10th A-Awards	Creativity Section	Won
2016	The 10th Cable TV Broadcasting Awards	Hot Issue Entertainment Impressions	Won
