= Sam Kim (chef) =

South Korean chef (born 1977)

- Born: May 8, 1977 (age 48); South Korea
- Culinary career
- Cooking style: Italian
- Current restaurant(s): Buonasera

Korean name
- Hangul: 김희태
- RR: Gim Huitae
- MR: Kim Hŭit'ae

Kim Hee-Tae (Korean: 김희태; born May 8, 1977), better known by his English-language name Sam Kim (샘 킴) is a South Korean chef and television personality. He was a cast member in the variety show Real Men and Please Take Care of My Refrigerator. He also hosted Sam and Raymon Cooking Time from 2011 to 2012.
