= Unfinished (film) =

- Theatrical release poster
- Hangul: 출국
- RR: Chulguk
- MR: Ch'ulguk
- Directed by: Noh Kyu-yeob
- Starring: Lee Beom-soo; Yeon Woo-jin; Park Joo-mi; Lee Jong-hyuk
- Production company: D.seed
- Release date: November 14, 2018 (South Korea)
- Running time: 105 minutes
- Countries: South Korea; Poland
- Box office: US$562,160

Unfinished (formerly known as In the Line of Fire and Departure, Korean: 사선에서; RR: Saseoneseo) is a 2018 South Korean drama thriller film directed by Noh Kyu-yeob. The film stars Lee Beom-soo, Yeon Woo-jin, Park Joo-mi and Lee Jong-hyuk. The film was released on November 14, 2018. It is based on the true story of Oh Kil-nam.

== Plot ==
Set in Berlin in 1986, the story revolves around Oh Young-Min, who has become a wanted man due to a run-in with a North Korean spy. The spy convinces him to move to North Korea under the pretext of safety for himself and his family. As the story unfolds, he realizes that this was a bad decision and flees to West Germany where he is separated from his family. To make things worse, he is under surveillance by various countries, all wanting to exploit him for different purposes.

== Cast ==
- Lee Beom-soo as Oh Young-min
- Yeon Woo-jin as Choi Moo-hyuk
- Park Joo-mi
- Lee Jong-hyuk as Choi Gi-chul
- Park Hyuk-kwon as Kim Cham-sa
- Jin Seon-kyu as Kim Cham-sa's Bodyguard 3, Kkong-chi

== Production ==
The film is based on the memoirs of Oh Kil-nam. Oh, a South Korean economist in Germany, moved to North Korea with his wife Shin Suk-ja and his two daughters. He later returned to Europe but was accused of being a North Korean operative. Following his surrender at the South Korean embassy in Germany in 1992, his wife and daughters were reportedly imprisoned in North Korea's Yodok concentration camp. The issue became a cause célèbre among South Korean conservatives. Choi Hong-jae, who was an official at the presidential Blue House during the early Park Geun-hye administration, was involved in the campaign to raise public awareness of Shin's imprisonment. Choi eventually convinced SH Film, whose CEO was also an alumnus of Choi's alma mater Korea University, to purchase the film rights to Oh's memoirs.

Principal photography began in September 2016 and was completed in December 2016.

== Release ==
The film was originally set to be released in April 2017, but was pushed to 14 November 2018 due to the whitelist scandal involving former South Korean President Park Geun-hye. In March 2017, it was revealed that the film's production team was suspected of being one of the pro-government organizations that received illegal funds.

== Whitelist controversy ==
On 31 May 2017, two months after Park Geun-hye's whitelist was revealed, the film was accused of being funded by the government. Kim Uh-jun from Kim Uh-jun's Newsroom reported that, of the total production cost of the film of ₩ 4.5 billion, about ₩ 4.3 billion was financed by the government. He mentioned that the film was intended to promote patriotism, nationalism, and to induce public support for the government.
