= Asians in Germany =

Asians in Germany / German Asians Deutsch Asiaten
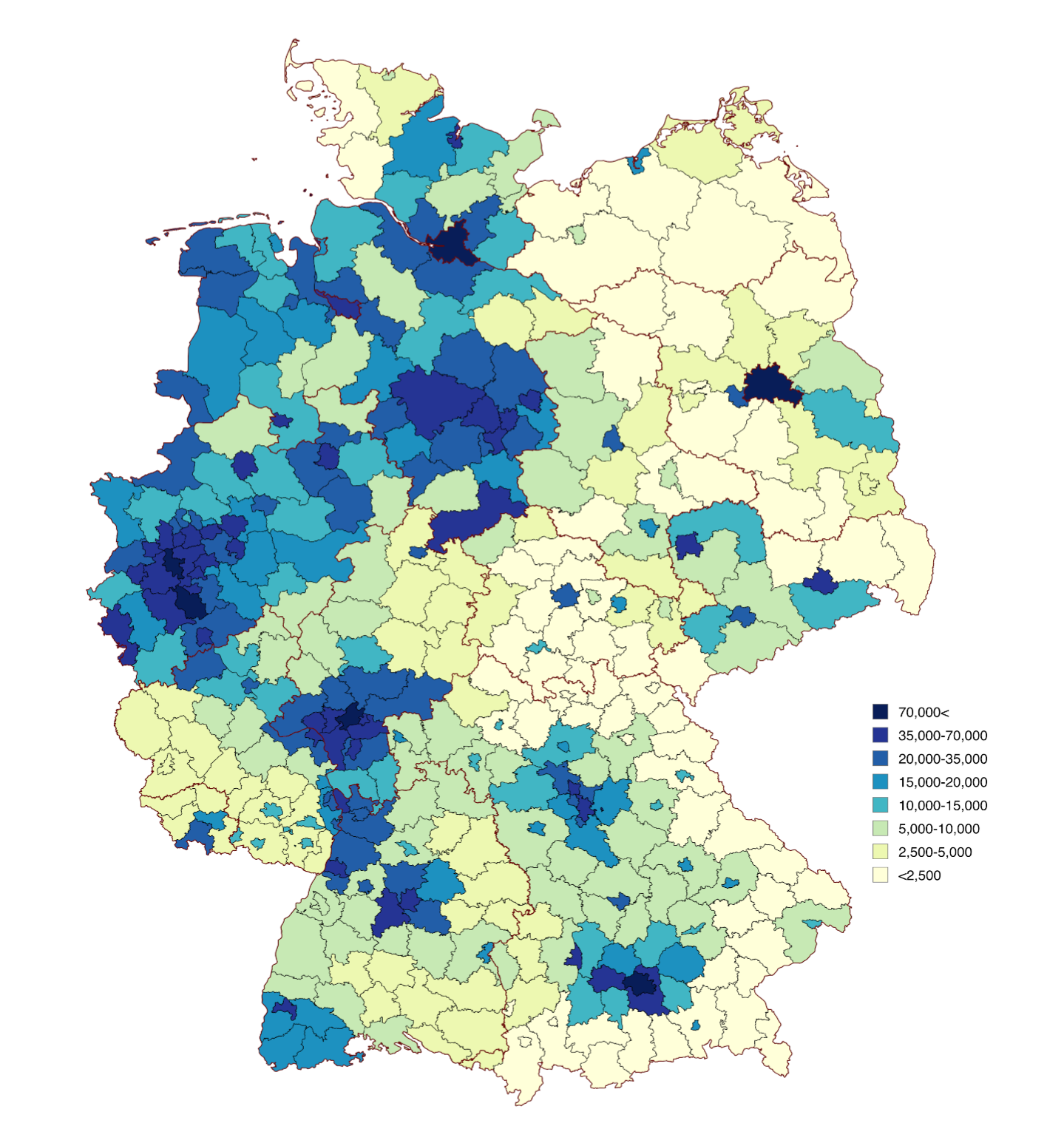
- Distribution of people with roots from the Asian continent in Germany.

Total population
- 1,890,000 est. (2.0% of the German population)

Regions with significant populations
- Berlin, Hamburg, Munich, Frankfurt am Main, Düsseldorf, Hanover, Ruhrgebiet, Cologne, Leipzig, Dresden, Rostock, Mainz, Kaiserslautern, Braunschweig, Rhein-Neckar-Kreis

Languages
- German; Asian languages

Religion
- Various religions Predominantly Buddhism, Irreligion and Islam but also Christianity, Hinduism and Sikhism

Asians in Germany or German Asians (German: Deutsch-Asiaten) are German citizens of full or partial Asian descent. The term Asian German is also applied to foreign residents of Asian origin living in the Federal Republic of Germany. German Asians have been present in Germany in small numbers since the 19th century and originate primarily from countries like Vietnam, China, Thailand, India, Afghanistan, Kazakhstan, Sri Lanka, South Korea, Japan, Indonesia or the Philippines. Although Germany's official census data does not collect specific data on ethnicity or race, but rather nationality, the number of people with an Asian "migrant background" is listed in statistical reports.

As of 2011, there were approximately 1,890,000 people from or descendants of peoples from Southeast Asia, East Asia, Central Asia or South Asia living in Germany. However, these numbers do not include Western Asians such as Anatolian Turks, Kurds, Assyrians, Mizrahi Jews, Arabs or Iranians. If West Asian peoples were to be included, the numbers would be significantly higher as there are over 2.5 million German Turks alone.

== History ==
=== Before World War II ===
In late Antiquity and the early Middle Ages, there had been in parts of what is now Germany a periodical presence of nomadic tribal groups of either partial or full Central Asian/East Asian stock, like the Huns and the Avars. Besides, in the 13th century Mongol military detachments carried out plunder and scorched-earth operations in the easternmost parts of German territory. However, the first mentioned Asians in Germany proper were Chinese. In 1822 two Cantonese-speaking seafarers, Feng Yaxing and Feng Yanxue came to Berlin. They were employed as stoker on steamships in Hamburg and Bremen. During the mid to late 19th and early 20th century many seamen and students resided in the Hamburg district of St. Pauli, forming a Chinatown. Due to the Nazi regime, most of the Chinese population had to leave in the 1930s to escape discrimination.

=== Present ===
In western Germany, many Vietnamese people arrived in the 1960s or 1970s as refugees from the Vietnam War. The comparatively larger Vietnamese community in eastern Germany traces its origins to assistance agreements between the GDR and the North Vietnamese government. Under these agreements, guest workers from Vietnam were brought to East Germany, where they soon made up the largest immigrant group and were provided with technical training. Following the fall of the Berlin Wall, many stayed in Germany. Since the early 1990s there has been an influx of Thai people, South Koreans, Indonesians and Filipinos coming to Germany as nurses, au pairs or employees. In addition, illegal immigration from Vietnam via Eastern Europe is increasing significantly in the East German states. Furthermore, there are far more Thai and Filipino women than men in Germany, while the reverse holds true for Chinese and Indians. The Vietnamese community which now forms the largest group of Asians in Germany has a more equal male-female ratio.

== Demographic distribution ==
According to the German "Mikrozensus 2011" there were about 1.8 million people with an Asian migrant background living in Germany. Of those about 600,000 were of Southeast Asian descent (primarily from Vietnam or Thailand).

The distribution of German Asians by federal state is as follows:

State	Number of Asians	% of State population
North Rhine-Westphalia	457,000	2.5
Baden-Württemberg	273,000	2.5
Bavaria	253,000	2.0
Hesse	200,000	3.2
Berlin	150,000	4.0
Lower Saxony	209,000	2.5
Rhineland-Palatinate	105,000	2.5
Hamburg	80,000	4.5
Schleswig-Holstein	51,000	1.5
Bremen	20,000	3.0
Neue Länder (former East Germany)	117,000	1.0
Saarland	15,000	1.5

== See also ==
- Demographics of Germany
- Chinese people in Germany
- Indians in Germany
- Iranians in Germany
- Iraqis in Germany
- Japanese people in Germany
- Koreans in Germany
- Kurds in Germany
- Lebanese people in Germany
- Syrians in Germany
- Turks in Germany
- Vietnamese people in Germany
- East Asian British
- Asian American
- Asian Canadian
