= Shin Suk-ja =

South Korean prisoner of North Korea

- Born: 1942 (age 82–83); Tōei, Korea, Empire of Japan
- Known for: Prisoner of conscience in North Korea
- Spouse: Oh Kil-nam
- Children: Oh Hae-won (1976); Oh Kyu-won (1978)

Korean name
- Hangul: 신숙자
- Hanja: 申淑子
- RR: Sin Sukja
- MR: Sin Sukcha

Shin Suk-ja (also spelled Shin Sook-ja; born 1942) is a South Korean woman who is currently imprisoned, along with her daughters, in North Korea after her husband Oh Kil-nam defected from North Korea to Denmark, having been given a political asylum. The case received international attention, including Amnesty International's naming her a prisoner of conscience and campaigning heavily for her release; this appeal remains ignored by North Korean authorities.

== Early life in South Korea and Germany ==
Shin was born in Tongyeong (Tōei), Gyeongsangnam-do (Keishōnan-dō), Chōsen in an area now part of South Korea. She attended elementary and middle school there. From 1958 she studied nursery at Masan Nursing School. In 1970 she left South Korea for Germany, where she worked as a nurse in Tübingen. There she met Oh Kil-nam, a South Korean economics student, marrying him in 1972. Later they moved near Kiel (Germany), where she gave birth to her daughters Oh Hae-won (on September 17, 1976) and Oh Kyu-won (on June 21, 1978). The family lived in Kronshagen near Kiel until 1985.

== Move to North Korea ==
Oh became involved in political activism against the South Korean government in the early 1980s. He was influenced in this by a number of famous South Korean leftists in Germany, including Song Du-yul and Yun Isang; they later suggested that he could help his motherland by working as an economist in North Korea. His activism also attracted the attention of North Korean government representatives, who further attempted to entice him to defect, claiming that his wife could receive free treatment for her hepatitis in Pyongyang. Over Shin's objections, the family moved to North Korea, arriving on 8 December 1985. Instead of receiving the promised medical treatment, he and his wife were reportedly held at a military camp and forced to study the Juche ideology of Kim Il Sung. They were then employed making propaganda broadcasts to South Korea. While there, Oh claims to have met South Korean abductees who were also employed making propaganda broadcasts, including two of the flight attendants from the Korean Air Lines YS-11 hijacking.

Later, the North Korean authorities sent Oh Kil-nam back to Germany to recruit other South Korean students for North Korea, telling him his family could not go along. Oh said later that Shin hit him in the face when he said he would come back with some South Koreans, and that she then told him, "we have to pay the price for our wrong decision, but you shouldn't follow an order that victimizes others and just run away. Our daughters shouldn't become the daughters of hateful accomplices. If you escape this country, please rescue us, but if you fail, believe that we're dead."

== Oh Kil-nam's defection ==
In 1986, Oh Kil-nam requested political asylum in Denmark on his way to Germany. The following year, Shin and her daughters (then 9 and 11 years old) were deported to Yodok camp, apparently because her husband did not return to North Korea. Official North Korean intermediaries gave Oh letters from Shin and her daughters in 1988 and 1989, and an audio tape with their voices and six photos of the family from Yodok in 1991. Some of the photos were published. North Korean defectors and former Yodok prisoners An Hyuk and Kang Chol-hwan stated that Shin had attempted suicide several times, but was still alive at the time of their 1987 release.

Korea Times reported in September 2011 that Shin and her daughters were alive and had been relocated to another prison camp. The report also stated that she denied having written a pledge of allegiance to Kim Jong Il.

== Campaigns on Shin Suk-ja's behalf ==
In 1993, Amnesty International started a campaign to free Shin and her daughters from Yodok camp. On the basis of all the available information, Amnesty International believes that Shin Sook Ja and her two daughters were detained because of Oh's request for political asylum abroad. Amnesty International designated Shin and her daughters as prisoners of conscience and called on the North Korean authorities to release them immediately and unconditionally.

In April 2011, human rights activists in Shin's hometown including Kim Sung-uk started the "Daughter of Tongyeong Rescue Campaign", which received some media attention in South Korea and worldwide and as of September 2011, had collected more than 70,000 signatures to free Shin and her daughters.

In July 2011, SAGE Korea led by South Korean activist Kim Sung-uk held a special event calling for the release of Shin, along with her daughters.

In November 2011, Amnesty International included Shin and other prisoners in Yodok camp in the "Write for Rights" letter-writing campaign. A month later, the Korean Central News Agency, North Korea's state news service, described the campaign for Shin Suk-ja as "a smear campaign", "prompted by black-hearted intentions".

== Death report ==
In a May 2012 response to an inquiry by the United Nations, a North Korean official replied that Shin had died of hepatitis. The ambassador also stated that Shin and Oh's daughters had renounced their father for "abandoning" his family. Oh replied in a press conference that he did not believe the report, citing cases in which abducted Japanese citizens had been falsely declared dead by North Korea.

== See also ==
- Human rights in North Korea
