= The Aquariums of Pyongyang =

2000 book by Kang Chol-hwan and Pierre Rigoulot

The Aquariums of Pyongyang: Ten Years in the North Korean Gulag
- Author: Kang Chol-hwan; Pierre Rigoulot
- Translator: Yair Reiner (English); Kang Chol-hwan (Korean)
- Genre: Memoir
- Publisher: The Perseus Press
- Publication date: 2000 (France); November 22, 2001 (United States)
- Media type: Print (Hardcover and paperback)
- Pages: 238
- ISBN: 1-903985-05-6
- OCLC: 59531886

The Aquariums of Pyongyang: Ten Years in the North Korean Gulag (Korean: 수용소의 노래), by Kang Chol-hwan and Pierre Rigoulot, is an account of the imprisonment of Kang Chol-Hwan and his family in the Yodok concentration camp in North Korea.

It begins with an introduction by co-author Pierre Rigoulot describing Kang's new life in the Republic of Korea, then continues with a brief history of both North and South Korea since the Korean War in 1953. While incarcerated, Kang claims to have met Pak Seung-zin, a member of the North Korea national football team in the 1966 FIFA World Cup. He says that Pak and other players had been imprisoned after returning from the tour. However, in the documentary film The Game of Their Lives, Pak and the other players were interviewed and they denied Kang's claim that they had been imprisoned.

The most recent publication in 2005 includes an account of his meeting with former U.S. President George W. Bush. According to Victor Cha, President Bush considered the book to be "one of the most important books he read during his presidency".

== See also ==
- Human rights in North Korea
- North Korean literature
- Yodok Stories
- Yeonmi Park
- Shin Dong-hyuk
