= Oh Kil-nam =

South Korean economist (born 1942)

- Born: 1942 (age 83–84); Uiseong, Gyeongsangbuk-do, Japanese Korea (today South Korea)
- Known for: Economist, defector to North Korea
- Spouse: Shin Suk-ja
- Children: Oh Hae-won (1976); Oh Kyu-won (1978)

Korean name
- Hangul: 오길남
- Hanja: 吳吉男
- RR: O Gilnam
- MR: O Killam

Oh Kil-nam (born 1942) is a retired South Korean economist, who was offered a job as an economist in North Korea, and so defected to North Korea with his wife Shin Suk-ja and daughters, then left them behind when he obtained political asylum in Denmark, where he was working in the North Korean embassy.

== Early life and education ==
Oh was born in Uiseong, Gyeongsangbuk-do, in the southern half of the Korean Peninsula, and then went to Busan for high school. He graduated from Seoul National University in 1970, where he majored in German literature. After his graduation, he went to Germany to pursue graduate education in economics. In 1972, he married Shin Suk-ja, a fellow South Korean migrant in Germany. The couple had two daughters, Oh Hae-won (born 1976) and Oh Kyu-won (born 1978). He filed his doctoral dissertation at the University of Bremen in 1985, on the topic of Japanese Marxian economist Nobuo Okishio and the labour theory of value.

== Defection to North Korea and back ==
Oh became involved in political activism against the South Korean government in the early 1980s. He was influenced in this by a number of famous South Korean leftists in Germany, including Song Du-yul and Yun Isang; they later suggested that he could help his motherland by working as an economist in North Korea. His activism also attracted the attention of North Korean government representatives, who further attempted to entice him to defect, claiming that his wife could receive free treatment for her hepatitis in Pyongyang. Over the objections of his wife, Oh took his family to North Korea, arriving on 8 December 1985. Instead of receiving the promised medical treatment, he and his wife were held at a military camp and forced to study the Juche ideology of Kim Il Sung, then employed making propaganda broadcasts to South Korea. While there, he claims to have met South Korean abductees who were also employed making propaganda broadcasts, including two of the flight attendants from the Korean Air Lines YS-11 hijacking.

Oh was later instructed to return to Germany to recruit other South Korean students to defect to North Korea; though he initially intended to follow through with his instructions, his wife argued fiercely with him—according to Oh's own account—stating that he could not have such acts on his conscience. Oh claims his wife told him to leave North Korea and "think of [her] and [their] daughters as being dead from a car accident". On 21 November 1986, Oh arrived in Denmark, where he requested political asylum from the immigration officers at the airport. In 1987, North Korean representatives warned Oh that his family would face difficulties if he failed to return to the country. They were eventually imprisoned in the Yodok concentration camp. Oh received letters from his family in 1988, 1989, and 1991. Yun Isang gave Oh the final letter personally on 20 January 1991; it contained a letter from his wife, six photographs and tape-recorded messages from his daughters. The recorded messages informed Oh it was safe to return to North Korea, though Oh suspected this was a trap by the North Korean government. According to the Democracy Network Against the North Korean Gulag, Oh is the only person to have obtained such information about people interned in camps in the North.

== Return to South Korea ==
Oh surrendered to South Korean authorities at the embassy in Germany in April 1992, and returned to South Korea. In October 1992, he met with North Korean defectors An Hyuk and Kang Chol-hwan, former internees of the Yodok concentration camp, who told him that his wife and daughters were still alive and being held there; they also reported that his wife had made several suicide attempts. After his return, he began working at a government-funded think tank. In 1993, he published a book about his experiences, titled Please Return My Wife and Daughters, Kim Il Sung. He testified at the 2003 espionage trial of Song Du-yul.

For 17 years he received no further news of his family. It was reported that his family were alive as of September 2011, and had recently been relocated from Yodok prison camp to a restricted area in Pyongyang. Oh's fight to reunite his family gained wider media coverage with the 2011 establishment of the Daughter of Tongyeong Campaign, which aims to petition UN Secretary-General Ban Ki-moon to address the situation. In 2012, North Korea stated that Oh's wife Shin had died of hepatitis, the same disease for which Oh took her to North Korea to seek treatment decades before. Choi Sung-yong of the North Korea Abductee Family Association suggested that the statement was a ploy by North Korea to quell rising South Korean criticism of the treatment of Oh's family.

== Publications ==
- Oh, Kil-nam (1985), Zu Nobuo Okishios Neufundierung der Marxschen Arbeitswert- und Produktionspreislehre in den fünfziger Jahren: ein Beitrag zur surplustheoretischen Analyse der Beziehung zwischen Arbeitsproduktivität, Reallohnsatz u. Profitrate [On Nobuo Okishio's refoundation of Marx's labor theory of value and price of production in the fifties: a contribution to surplus-theoretical analysis of the relationship between productivity, real wage rate, and profit rate], Ph.D. dissertation, University of Bremen, OCLC 64173222
- Oh, Kil-nam (1989), Analytische Grundlagen der Marxschen politischen Ökonomie: Okishios surplustheoretischer Beitrag zur Untersuchung der Beziehung zwischen Arbeitsproduktivität, Reallohnsatz und Profitrate [Analytical Foundations of Marxian political economy: Okishio's surplus-theoretical contribution to the study of the relationship between worker productivity, real wage rate, and profit rate], Hannover, OCLC 248717245
- 오길남 (1993), 《김일성주석,내아내와딸을돌려주오》 [Please Return My Wife and Daughters, Kim Il Sung], 서울: 自由文學社, ISBN 978-89-424-0010-2, OCLC 29659626
- Oh, Kil-nam (1995), Das Paradies ohne Sonne [The Paradise without the Sun], Seoul: Institute for Social Sciences, Hanyang University, ISBN 978-89-950015-0-9, OCLC 180501748

== See also ==
- Human rights in North Korea
- Shin Suk-ja – South Korean prisoner of North Korea
