= Isang Yun =

Korean and German composer (1917–1995)

Isang Yun 윤이상
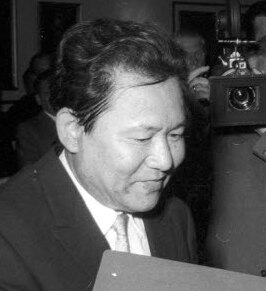
- Isang Yun in 1969

Background information
- Born: 17 September 1917; Sansei, Korea, Empire of Japan
- Died: 3 November 1995 (aged 78) Berlin, Germany
- Genres: Traditional korean music, Avant-garde music
- Occupation: Composer
- Instrument: Cello
- Years active: 1935–1995

- Isang Yun
- Hangul: 윤이상
- Hanja: 尹伊桑
- RR: Yun Isang
- MR: Yun Isang

Isang Yun, or Yun I-sang (Korean: 윤이상; 17 September 1917 – 3 November 1995), was a Korean-born composer who made his later career in West Germany.

== Early life and education ==
Yun was born in Sancheong (Sansei), Korea in 1917, the son of poet Yun Ki-hyon. His family moved to Tongyeong (Tōei) when he was three years old. He began to study violin at the age of 13 whereupon he composed his first melody. Despite his father's opposition to pursuing a career in music, Yun began formal music training two years later with a violinist in a military band in Keijō (present day Seoul). Eventually his father relented once Yun agreed to enroll in a business school while continuing his musical studies. In 1935 Yun moved to Osaka where he studied cello, music theory, and composition briefly at the Osaka College of Music. He soon returned to Tongyeong where he composed a "Shepherd's Song" for voice and piano. In 1939 Yun traveled again to Japan, this time to Tokyo in order to study under Tomojiro Ikenouchi. When the Pacific War began in December 1941, he moved back to Korea where he participated in the Korean independence movement. He was arrested for these activities in 1943 and was imprisoned for two months. Yun was interned at Keijō Imperial University Hospital for complications resulting from tuberculosis when Korea was liberated from Japanese rule in August 1945.

After the war he did welfare work, establishing an orphanage for war orphans, and teaching music in Tongyeong and Busan. After the armistice ceasing hostilities in the Korean War in 1953, he began teaching at the Seoul National University. He received the Seoul City Culture Award in 1955, and traveled to Europe the following year to finish his musical studies.

At the Paris Conservatory (1956–57) he studied composition under Tony Aubin and Pierre Revel, and West Berlin (1957–59), and at the Musikhochschule Berlin (today the Berlin University of the Arts) under Boris Blacher, Josef Rufer, and Reinhard Schwarz-Schilling. In 1958 he attended the International Summer Courses of Contemporary Music in Darmstadt and began his career in Europe with premieres of his Music for Seven Instruments in Darmstadt and Five Pieces for Piano in Bilthoven. The premiere of his oratorio Om mani padme hum in Hanover 1965 and Réak in Donaueschingen (1966) gave him international renown. With "Réak" he introduced the sound idea of Korean ceremonial music (Korean: 례악; Hanja: 禮樂; RR: ryeak) as well as imitations of the East Asian mouth organ saenghwang (Korean), sheng (Chinese) or shō (Japanese) into Western avant-garde music.

== Kidnapping ==
From October 1959, Yun had been living in Krefeld, Freiburg im Breisgau and Cologne. With a grant from the Ford Foundation, he and his family settled in West Berlin in 1964. However, due to alleged acts of espionage, he was kidnapped by the South Korean secret service from West Berlin on 17 June 1967. Via Bonn he was taken to Seoul. In prison he was tortured, attempted suicide, forced to confess to espionage, threatened with the death sentence – and in the first instance sentenced to life imprisonment. A worldwide petition led by Guenter Freudenberg and Francis Travis was presented to the South Korean government, signed by approximately 200 artists, including Luigi Dallapiccola, Hans Werner Henze, Heinz Holliger, Mauricio Kagel, Herbert von Karajan, Joseph Keilberth, Otto Klemperer, György Ligeti, Arne Mellnäs, Per Nørgård, Karlheinz Stockhausen, Igor Stravinsky, and Bernd Alois Zimmermann. Yun was released on 23 February 1969, returning to West Berlin at the end of March. In 1971, he obtained German citizenship. He never returned to South Korea. From 1973 he began participating in the call for the democratization of South Korea and the reunification of the divided country.

== Teaching ==
Yun taught composition at the Hochschule für Musik, Theater und Medien Hannover (1969–71) and at the Hochschule der Künste in West Berlin (1977–85).

Among his students are Kazuhisa Akita, Jolyon Brettingham Smith, In-Chan Choe, Conrado del Rosario, Raymond Deane, Francisco F. Feliciano, Masanori Fujita, Keith Gifford, Holger Groschopp, Toshio Hosokawa, Sukhi Kang, Chung-Gil Kim, Wolfgang Klingt, Erwin Koch-Raphael, Isao Matsushita, Masahiro Miwa, Hwang-Long Pan, Martin Christoph Redel, Byong-Dong Paik, Bernfried Pröve, Takehito Shimazu, Minako Tanahashi, Masaru Tanaka, Michail Travlos, Jürgen Voigt, and Michael Whticker.

After 1979 Yun returned several times to North Korea to introduce new Western composition techniques as well as his own music. In 1982, the first Isang Yun Festival took place in Pyongyang. In 1984, the Isang Yun Music Institute opened in Pyongyang, North Korea. An ensemble had been founded there under his name. Yun promoted the idea of a joint concert featuring musicians from both Koreas in Panmunjom, which failed in 1988, but South Korean artists could be invited to Pyongyang in 1990.

== Later life and death ==
Two concerts with works of Isang Yun had been performed in Seoul (1982) by Heinz Holliger, Ursula Holliger, and Francis Travis, later by Roswitha Staege and Hans Zender. Yun was invited to attend a festival of his music in South Korea in 1994, but the trip was broken off after internal and external conflicts. Yun was told by South Korean officials that to return, he would have to submit a written confession of “repentance,” which he refused. On 3 November 1995, Yun died of pneumonia in Berlin. The International Isang Yun Society was founded in Berlin in February 1996.

Yun has often been criticized for his "pro-North Korean activities", i.e. musical activities in North Korea, and his close ties with the Kim Il Sung regime. Oh Kil-nam has said that Yun persuaded him to relocate to North Korea with his family. When Oh's wife Shin Suk-ja and her little daughters were imprisoned in Yodok camp, Yun helped them and took photos and a tape from North Korea to Berlin.

== Music ==
Yun's primary musical concern was the fusion of traditional Korean music through Western avant garde musical techniques. After experimenting with 12-tone techniques Yun developed his own musical personality beginning in his post-serialistic "sound compositions" of the early 1960s. Yun's music employed techniques associated with traditional Korean music, such as glissandi, pizzicati, portamenti, vibrati, and above all a very rich vocabulary of ornaments. Essential is the presence of multiple-melodic lines, which Yun called "Haupttöne" ("central" or "main tones").

Yun's composition for symphonic forces started with "sound compositions", i.e. of works in which homogeneous sound planes are articulated and elaborated: Bara (1960) until Overture (1973; rev. 1974). A period of discursively structured instrumental concertos followed, beginning with the Concerto for Violoncello and Orchestra (1975–76) and climaxing with the Violin Concerto No. 1 (1981). From 1982 until 1987 he wrote a cycle of five symphonies, which are interrelated, yet varied structurally. Striving for freedom and peace is above all Symphony V for high baritone and large orchestra (1987) with texts by Nelly Sachs. In 1984, he developed also a new, intimate "tone" in his chamber music.

At that time peace and reconciliation on the Korean Peninsula was his political goal. His lifelong concern with his native country and culture was expressed in several of his compositions, including the orchestral piece Exemplum in Memoriam Kwangju (1981) which he composed in memory of the Gwangju massacre, Naui Dang, Naui Minjokiyo! (My Land, My People) for soli, chorus and orchestra (South Korean poets, 1987), and Angel in Flames (Engel in Flammen) for orchestra, with Epilogue for soprano, women's choir and five instruments (1994). Otherwise Yun himself stated often that he was not a political composer but only following the voice of his conscience.

In both Europe and the United States, Yun developed a reputation as a composer of avant-garde music, assigned signature elements of traditional Korean musical technique. The technical as well as stylistic difficulties of performing his elaborate and ornamental music are considered formidable.

== Memberships and awards ==
- Culture Prize of the City of Seoul (1956)
- Member (1968) and Honorary Member (1992) of the Freie Akademie der Künste Hamburg
- Member (1973) of the Academy of Arts, Berlin
- Kultur- und Wissenschaftspreis der Stadt Kiel (1969)
- Commander's Cross of the Order of Merit of the Federal Republic of Germany (1988)
- Goethe Medal (1995)

== Works ==
All compositions are published by Bote & Bock / Boosey & Hawkes, Berlin.

Operas

- Der Traum des Liu-Tung (1965)
- Die Witwe des Schmetterlings (Butterfly Widow) (1967/68)
- Geisterliebe (1971)
- Sim Tjong (1971/72), written for the Olympics in Munich, with William B. Murray

Vocal / Choral

- Om mani padme hum for soli, choir and orchestra (1964)
- Ein Schmetterlingstraum for choir and percussion (1968)
- Vom Tao for choir, organ and percussion (1972/88)
- Memory for three voices and percussion (Du Mu, 1974)
- An der Schwelle for barione, women choir, organ and ensemble (Albrecht Haushofer, 1975)
- Der weise Mann for baritone, choir and small orchestra (1977)
- Der Herr ist mein Hirte for trombone and choir (Psalm 23 / Nelly Sachs, 1981)
- O Licht... for violin and choir (Buddhism / Nelly Sachs, 1981)
- Naui Dang, Naui Minjokiyo! (My Land, My People) for soli, orchestra and choir (South Korean poets, 1987)
- Engel in Flammen. Memento and Epilogue for orchestra, soprano, and women choir (1994)
- Epilogue for soprano, women choir, and five instruments (1994)

Orchestral

- Symphonies
  - Symphony No. 1 in four movements (1982/83)
  - Symphony No. 2 in three movements (1984)
  - Symphony No. 3 in one movement (1985)
  - Symphony No. 4 Im Dunkeln singen in two movements (1986)
  - Symphony No. 5 for high baritone and orchestra in five movements (Nelly Sachs, 1987)
  - Chamber Symphony No. 1, for 2 oboes, 2 horns, and strings (1987)
  - Chamber Symphony No. 2 Den Opfern der Freiheit (1989)
- Bara for orchestra (1960)
- Symphonic Scene for large orchestra (1960)
- Colloïdes sonores for strings (1961)
- Fluktuationen for large orchestra (1964)
- Réak for large orchestra (1966)
- Dimensionen for orchestra and organ (1971)
- Konzertante Figuren for small orchestra (1972)
- Harmonia for 16 winds, harp & percussion (1974)
- Muak for large orchestra (1978)
- Exemplum in memoriam Kwangju for large orchestra (1981)
- Impression for small orchestra (1986)
- Mugung-Dong (Invocation) for winds, percussion and double bass (1986)
- Tapis for string orchestra (1987)
- Konturen for large orchestra (1989)
- Silla for orchestra (1992)

Concertos

- Violin Concerto No. 1 (1981)
- Violin Concerto No. 2 (1983–1986)
- Violin Concerto No. 3 (1992)
- Cello Concerto (1975/76)
- Flute Concerto (1977)
- Clarinet Concerto (1981)
- Double Concerto for Oboe, Harp, and Chamber Orchestra (1977)
- Fanfare and Memorial for orchestra with harp and flute (1979)
- Gong-Hu for harp and strings (1984)
- Duetto concertante for oboe, English horn, and strings (1987)
- Concerto for Oboe (Oboe d'amore) and Orchestra (1990)

Chamber (seven and more players) / Ensemble

- Music for Seven Instruments (1959)
- Loyang for ensemble (1962)
- Pièce concertante for ensemble (1976)
- Oktett for clarinet (bass clarinet), bassoon, horn & string quintet (1978)
- Distanzen for ten players (woodwind & string quintets) (1988)
- Kammerkonzert No. 1 (1990)
- Kammerkonzert No. 2 (1990)
- Wind Octet with double bass (1991)

For one instrument

- Five Pieces for Piano (1958)
- Shao Yang Yin for cembalo or piano (1966)
- Tuyaux sonores for organ solo (1967)
- Glissées für violoncello solo (1970)
- Piri for oboe solo (1971)
- Etudes I-V for flute(s) solo (1974)
- Fragment for organ (1975)
- Koenigliches Thema for violin solo (1976)
- Salomo for alto flute solo (1977/78)
- Interludium A for piano (1982)
- Monolog for bass clarinet (1983)
- Monolog for bassoon solo (1983/84)
- Li-Na im Garten. Five Pieces for Violin solo (1984/85)
- In Balance for harp solo (1987)
- Kontraste. Two Pieces for Violin solo (1987)
- Sori for flute solo (1988)
- Chinesische Bilder. Four Pieces for Flute or Recorder solo (1993)
- Seven Etudes for Violoncello solo (1993)

For two instruments

- Garak for flute and piano (1963)
- Gasa for violin and piano (1963)
- Nore for violoncello and piano (1964)
- Riul for clarinet and piano (1968)
- Duo for viola & piano (1976)
- Espace I for violoncello & piano (1992)
- Inventionen for 2 oboes (1983)
- Inventionen for 2 flutes (1983; arr. 1984)
- Sonatina for 2 violins (1983)
- Duo for cello & harp (1984)
- Intermezzo for cello & accordion (1988)
- Contemplation for 2 violas (1988)
- Rufe for oboe & harp (1989)
- Together for violin & double bass (1989)
- Sonata for violin & piano (1991)
- Ost-West-Miniaturen I-II for oboe & violoncello (1994)

For three instruments

- Gagok for voice, guitar & percussion (1972)
- Trio for flute, oboe & violin (1972/73)
- Piano trio (1972/75)
- Rondell for oboe, clarinet and fagott (1975)
- Sonata for oboe (oboe d'amore), harp, and violoncello (or viola) (1979)
- Rencontre for clarinet, cello & piano (or harp) (1986)
- Pezzo fantasioso for two (melody) instruments and bass instrument ad libitum (1988)
- Trio for clarinet, bassoon & horn (1992)
- Espace II for oboe, cello & harp (1993)

Four instruments

- String Quartet No. 3 in three movements (1959)
- Images for flute, oboe, violin, and violoncello (1968)
- Novellette for flute and harp with violin and violoncello (1980)
- Quartet for flutes (1986)
- Quartet for flute, violin, violoncello & piano (1988)
- String Quartet No. 4 in two movements (1988)
- Quartet for horn, trumpet, trombone & piano (1992)
- String Quartet No. 5 in one movement (1990)
- String Quartet No. 6 in four movements (1992)
- Quartet for oboe and string trio (1994)

Five instruments

- Concertino for accordion & string quartet (1983)
- Clarinet Quintet No. 1 for clarinet and string quartet (1984)
- Flute Quintet for flute and string quartet (1986)
- Tapis for string quintet (1987)
- Festlicher Tanz for wind quintet (1988)
- Woodwind Quintet I and II (1991)
- Clarinet Quintet No. 2 (1994)

== See also ==
- Koreans in Germany
- List of 20th century classical composers
- Tongyeong International Music Festival
- Isang Yun Competition

== Essential Bibliography ==
- Hinrich Bergmeier (ed.): Isang Yun. Festschrift zum 75. Geburtstag 1992. Bote & Bock, Berlin 1992. contains: Walter-Wolfgang Sparrer: Identität und Wandel. Zu den Streichquartetten III-VI. pp. 28–57.
- Ae-Kyung Choi: Einheit und Mannigfaltigkeit. Eine Studie zu den fünf Symphonien von Isang Yun. (= Berliner Musik Studien. Volume 25). Studio Verlag, Sinzig 2002.
- Insook Han: Interkulturalität in der neuen Musik Koreas. Integration und Hybridität in der Musik von Isang Yun und Byungki Hwang. (Studien zur Musikwissenschaft. Volume 23). Dissertation, Universität Graz 2009, Verlag Dr. Kovac, Hamburg 2011.
- Hanns-Werner Heister, Walter-Wolfgang Sparrer (eds.): Der Komponist Isang Yun. edition text + kritik, München 1987. (contains more than 30 articles on Isang Yun, Isang Yun's Salzburg conference „Über meine Musik“, a chronology of Yun's works, bibliography, discography). – Korean Edition: Hang’il, Seoul 1991. – Italian edition: Isang Yun. Musica nello spirito del Tao. Ricordi, Milan 2007.
- Keith Howard: Music across the DMZ, in John Morgan O’Connell, Salwa El-Shawan Castelo-Branco (eds.): Music in Conflict. University of Illinois Press, Indiana 2010, S. 67–88.
- Kunz, H.: "Yun, Isang" at Grove Music Online
- Jürgen Maehder, Konvergenzen des musikalischen Strukturdenkens. Zur Geschichte und Klassifizierung der Klangfelder in den Partituren Isang Yuns, in: Musiktheorie, 7/1992, pp. 151–166.
- MusikTexte. Nr. 62/63. Köln, Januar 1996 (contains 17 articles on Yun).
- Luise Rinser, Isang Yun: Der verwundete Drache. Dialog über Leben und Werk des Komponisten Isang Yun. S. Fischer, Frankfurt 1977.
- Gesine Schröder: … fremden Raum betreten. Zum Europäischen in Yuns Musik. Hochschule für Musik und Theater „Felix Mendelssohn Bartholdy“, Leipzig 2001/2011. (online)
- Walter-Wolfgang Sparrer: Isang Yun. In: Hanns-Werner Heister, Walter-Wolfgang Sparrer (eds.): Komponisten der Gegenwart. edition text + kritik, München 1992ff.
- Walter-Wolfgang Sparrer/Hanns-Werner Heister(eds.): Der Komponist Isang Yun, Edition text + kritik, 2. edition Munich 1992.
- Walter-Wolfgang Sparrer (eds.): Ssi-ol. Almanach 1997 der Internationalen Isang Yun Gesellschaft e. V. Berlin 1997.
- Walter-Wolfgang Sparrer (eds.): Ssi-ol. Almanach 1998/99 der Internationalen Isang Yun Gesellschaft e. V. edition text + kritik, München 1999.
- Walter-Wolfgang Sparrer (eds.): Ssi-ol. Almanach 2000/01 der Internationalen Isang Yun Gesellschaft e. V. edition text + kritik, München 2002.
- Walter-Wolfgang Sparrer (eds.): Ssi-ol. Almanach 2002/03 der Internationalen Isang Yun Gesellschaft e. V. edition text + kritik, München 2004.
- Walter-Wolfgang Sparrer (eds.): Ssi-ol. Almanach 2004/09 der Internationalen Isang Yun Gesellschaft e. V. edition text + kritik, München 2009.
- Walter-Wolfgang Sparrer: „Im Dunkeln singen …“ Luise Rinser und Isang Yun, in: José Sánchez de Murillo/Martin Thurner (eds.): Aufgang. Jahrbuch für Denken – Dichten – Musik, vol 9, Kohlhammer, Stuttgart 2012, pp. 104–121.
- Ilja Stephan: Isang Yun. Die fünf Symphonien, edd. Heinz-Klaus Metzger/Rainer Riehn, Edition text + kritik, München 2000 (= Musik-Konzepte, vol. 109/110).
- Shin-Hyang Yun: Zwischen zwei Musikwelten. Studien zum musikalischen Denken Isang Yuns. Königshausen & Neumann, Würzburg 2002.
