= Kim Sung-uk =

South Korean journalist

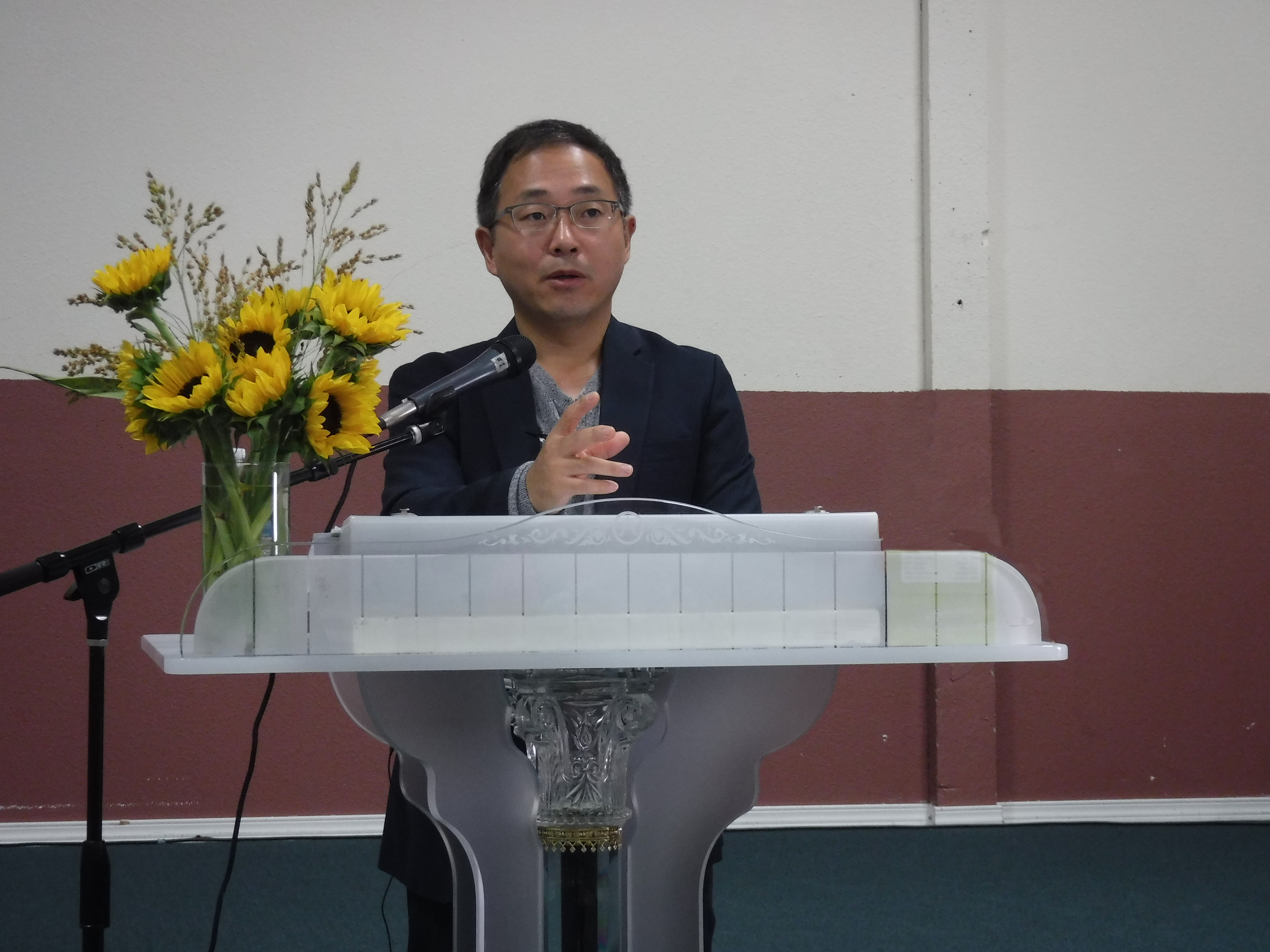
- Kim Sung-uk in 2019
- Born: 11 February 1971 (age 54); Seoul, South Korea
- Education: Yonsei University
- Occupation(s): Journalist, Political Commentator, Human Rights Activist
- Years active: 2006–present

Korean name
- Hangul: 김성욱
- Hanja: 金成昱
- RR: Gim Seonguk
- MR: Kim Sŏnguk
- Website: libertyherald.co.kr

Kim Sung-uk (Korean: 김성욱) is a South Korean journalist, political commentator, and North Korean human rights activist. As the president of the Korea Liberty Union and Jesus Wave Ministry, Kim has done work in educating the South Korean public, especially its youth, about North Korean human rights through lectures, books, and various public events. He has also appeared as a panelist on Korean TV networks Channel A and TV Chosun, where he discussed South Korean political issues and North Korean human rights.

== Early life and education ==
Kim was born on 11 February 1971, in Seoul, South Korea. He attended Yonsei University, where he received a Bachelor of Laws, a Master of Laws, and completed coursework for a PhD in international law. He also holds a degree from the Faith International University in Tacoma, Washington.

== Professional work ==
=== Korea Liberty Union & Jesus Wave Ministry ===
Kim Sung-uk is the president of Korea Liberty Union and Jesus Wave Ministry, South Korean organizations dedicated to policy analysis and research regarding North Korean issues, especially North Korean nuclear weapons and human rights issues. Through those organizations, he has focused on educating the South Korean public about the North Korean human rights crisis, especially its youth.

In addition, he has done many lectures at various churches, academic institutions (such as at the Heavenly Dream School) military bases, and others. He especially argues that engaging the North Korean regime is fundamentally flawed, due to the determination the North Korean elites have to preserve the regime. He also opposes humanitarian aid towards the North Korean regime in favor of sanctions, as he claims that most of the humanitarian aid that goes towards North Korea flow towards the regime. For that, he has received criticism from left-wing commentators in Korea who advocate engagement with North Korea.

He also holds trans-denominational Christian prayer meetings involving a lecture and prayer sessions for the North Korean people.

== North Korean Human Rights Activism ==
=== SAGE Korea ===
In 2011, there is a photo exhibit with drawings from those survivors illustrating the situations they have gone through in the camp. Those exhibits features Q&A sessions involving escapees from those camps, The goal of those events are for spreading awareness regarding North Korea's political prisoner camps and to pass a comprehensive North Korean human rights law at the Korean national assembly.

=== Rescue of Shin Suk-ja ===
In 2011, Kim helped organize a campaign for the release of Shin Suk-ja, and her daughters, South Korean citizens who were imprisoned in Yoduk Concentration Camp after visiting North Korea in 1985. The event, which was held in Tongyeong, her hometown, was held in commemoration of 100,000 signatures calling for their release. Kim held a special lecture informing the audience about the reality of North Korea's human rights and calling for the abolishment of North Korea's concentration camps. As part of SAGE Korea, Kim has also held another event in July 2011, again calling for their release.

== Publications ==
Kim has published 13 books regarding various issues in the Korean Peninsula. These include the Korean Communism Report (대한민국 적화보고서), published in 2006, Preoccupy North Korea, published in 2010 (북한을 선점하라), History Making, published in 2013, and Kim Jong-un Will Perish Like This, published in 2014 (김정은 이렇게 망한다).

=== Korean Communism Report ===
His first work that led to his acknowledgment around Korea was the Korean Communism Report, published in 2006 (대한민국 적화보고서) where he described the dangers of engagement and economic aid to North Korea, claiming that those types of aid only benefit the North Korean regime. He also discussed the vulnerabilities of the South Korean political system to a federation with North Korea, in which North Korea gradually takes over the Korean political system.

=== South Korea's Identity Series ===
Kim was one of the editors for the 2014 book series: South Korea's Identity Series (대한민국 정채성 총서), published by the book company Baeknyeondongan. The series attempted to provide a complete overview of South Korea's identity, both past, present, and future. He has published a book, Kim Jong-un Will Perish Like This, as part of that series, where he discussed the possible ways the Kim Jong-un regime could fall and how South Korea could unify the peninsula.

== Work on TV ==
Kim has been a panelist at the 'Returned Sniper' TV program on the Korean TV channel TV Chosun, which aired from 2013 to 2015. It was a daily live political commentary TV show, in which the commentators would discuss recent political issues in South and North Korea. Most of the commentators (including Kim) would have conservative political views on current issues in North and South Korean politics. Also, Kim has appeared on Channel A as a panelist on its news programs, where he held conservative issues on Korean politics, such as arguing for the shutdown of the Kaesong Industrial Complex. He has debated left-wing commentators in issues relating to North Korea and South Korean domestic issues.

== See also ==
- Human rights in North Korea
