= Yoduk Story =

Stage play by Jung Sung San

- Chosŏn'gŭl: 요덕 스토리
- Hancha: 耀德 스토리
- Revised Romanization: Yodeok Seutori
- McCune–Reischauer: Yodŏk Sŭt'ori

Yoduk Story is a stage play by North Korean defector Jung Sung San (Jeong Seongsan 정성산), released in 2006. The story is based on stories of political prisoners at the Yodok concentration camp.

The musical premiered in the US in October 2006. The writer and director, Jung Sung-San was never imprisoned at Yoduk, therefore he has relied on accounts of others who were there, including Kang Chol-Hwan. Jung was able to escape North Korea and find his way to South Korea, where in 2002, he learned that his father had been publicly stoned to death in the North. In his sorrow and anger, he sought out a way to express all his feelings and promptly began writing this musical. He faced death threats and government pressure to make changes. When financial backers pulled out in the midst of pressure, he put up his kidney as collateral for approximately $20,000.

== Songs ==
ACT I

- 우리를 보라 - Look at Us
- 당의 딸 - Daughter of the Party
- 조심 또 조심 - Careful, Be Careful
- 지옥의 수용소 요덕 - Hellish Prison Yoduk
- 차가운 핏줄 - Cold Blooded
- 죽여! - Kill Him!
- 심장이터지도록 - Until My Heart Bursts
- 언제나 또 볼까? - When Would We Meet Again?
- 나 살기 위해 꿈을 꿔 - I Dream to Survive
- 꿈 꿀 생각 하지마 - Don't Even Dare to Dream
- 오랫동안 꿈 꿔 왔지 - I've Waited for This Moment for So Long
- 난 미쳤어 - I Am Crazy
- 촛물 같은 생명 - Our Lives Are Just Like Candles

ACT II

- 변해가고 있어 - I Am Changing
- 내 마음을 모르겠어 - I Can't Read My Mind
- 때가 되면 - When The Time Comes
- 기도 - Prayer
- 내 마음대로 걷고 싶어 - I Want To Walk Free
- 마지막이 될지 모를 이 순간 - This Moment May Be Our Last
- 요덕이를 살려야해 - Save Yoduk
- 세균같은 자들 - You Are Like A Disease

== Plot ==
Kang Ryun-Hwa, an award-winning North Korean musical performer, learns that her father was charged as a spy working for the South Korean Intelligence Agency. She is taken to Yoduk along with her family, as in North Korea, families are punished for the crime of an individual. The guards are amused that a performer of her caliber has been reduced to a political prisoner. Ryun-Hwa tries to remain strong, but submits to rape by the prison guard captain Lee Myung-Soo under implicit threat to her family. She is later raped by ambitious lieutenant Hyuk-Chul under similar circumstances, though she gets Hyuk-Chul to promise to help her family escape. Ryun-Hwa discovers that she is pregnant, and agonizes over what to do. She ultimately decides to commit suicide, but Myung-Soo saves her life. Hyuk-Chul learns of the pregnancy through an informant, and savagely beats the informant when he does not give specific enough information about how far along she is. A prisoner escapes from a different prison camp, and the Yoduk guards are ordered to set an example for their own prisoners. Myung-Soo orders temperance- only kill one prisoner as an example who might be able to escape, but Hyuk-Chul favors different measures. Later, by accident, Hyuk-Chul ends up murdering a child when he instead intended to kill Tae-Sik, a religious fan of South Korean music who has been stealing from the storehouse. Ryun-Hwa decides to give birth to her baby, as motivation and hope for escape from the prison camp.

Myung-Soo agonizes over Ryun-Hwa and her child, feeling guilt for raping her as well as toward the state for violating the rules against sexual contact with a prisoner. Ryun-Hwa gives birth to the baby, who is named Yoduk. Hyuk-Chul has Myung-Soo arrested, and starts to engage in increasing reprisals against the prisoners. This results in the death of Ryun-Hwa's parents, Tae-Sik, and the forcible severing of Run-Hwa's brother's arm via a sewing machine. Myung-Soo is sentenced to death by Hyuk-Chul, who orders Ryun-Hwa to either execute Myung-Soo herself, or he will murder Yoduk. He leaves them alone with another officer, Young-An. Young-An gives Myung-Soo his gun and suggests he simply kill himself now. Young-An exits. Rather than kill himself, Myung-Soo makes a last-ditch effort to try to get Ryun-Hwa and Yoduk out of the camp, but is confronted alone by Hyuk-Chul. Myung-Soo persuades Hyuk-Chul to help by tapping into Hyuk-Chul's own ambivalent feelings toward Ryun-Hwa and Yoduk. Young-An appears with the remaining guards and reveals himself as working for central intelligence. Myung-Soo reveals that he has the remote controls for the machine gun nests. A riot erupts and soon involves the prisoners, armed with crude farming implements. Five hundred prisoners and guards (in a camp of twenty-thousand) die, but Ryun-Hwa and Yoduk manage to escape to South Korea. Then the characters appear and sing, "God, Please Come to North Korea." This musical is based on the stories of people who experienced the horrors of North Korean prisons depicted in Yoduk, "the living hell on earth."

== Cast ==
- Kang Ryun-Hwa - Yunjung Choi
- Lee Myung-Soo - Jaechong Lim
- Ra Hyuk-Chul - Junkyum Kim
- Lee Tae-Sik - Wankyu Park
- Kang Man-Sik - Sundong Kim
- Crazy Woman - Changkyung Lee
- Lee Yoduk - Jonghwa Ryu

== Original Creative Team ==
- Libretto & Director - Jung Sung San
- Lyric - Yu Hye Jung
- Compose - Cha Kyung Chan
- Musical Director & Orchestration - Kim Hye Jin
- Choreograph - Oh Jae Ik
