= Defilada =

- Directed by: Andrzej Fidyk
- Written by: Andrzej Fidyk
- Release date: 1989
- Running time: 65 minutes
- Country: Poland
- Language: Polish

Defilada (The Parade) is a Polish 1989 documentary by Andrzej Fidyk. It focused on the cult of personality in North Korea, and was shot in 1988 on the 40th anniversary of the state's founding by Kim Il Sung.

Despite its widely perceived anti-totalitarian message, it has received praise from North Korea itself, likely because it followed official North Korean guideline, and its criticism is delivered through images of artificial behavior of populace living in a totalitarian system, without any critical commentary.

== Overview ==
The documentary was made on the occasion of the 40th anniversary celebrations of state's founding in North Korea, which the regime intended to use to eclipse the 1988 Summer Olympics taking place that year in Seoul, South Korea. The North Korean regime invited filmmakers from countries then considered friendly (Communist), including People's Republic of Poland, which sent a team under Andrzej Fidyk.

The documentary is primarily composed of declarative statements, as well as texts of North Korean newspapers and books. There was no author's commentary. Fidyk commented that he and his team were likely "the most disciplined" foreign team of filmmakers in North Korea, as they did not trouble the regime by looking under the surface - they were content with what they were given and asked to do.

== Reception ==
In North Korea, the documentary, upon its release, was officially praised, as it contains only officially approved footage and materials. However, the documentary's real aim, widely recognized abroad, was to condemn the totalitarian regime, through shocking contrasts of official images, and documenting artificial behavior of the populace. The message is conveyed not through commentary, but through footage, montage and content selection. While following the official guidelines, Fidyk "winks" at the viewer, showing the falseness of the setting.

The film was accepted by the Polish censors, despite its critique of the totalitarianism. In Poland, which has been a much more liberalized socialist country since October 1956, it has been well received. With support from the Polish Ministry of Education it has been incorporated into some Polish educational curriculum, primarily in the Education about Society courses. It is used to illustrate concepts such as propaganda, newspeak, and the totalitarian state. Even more surprisingly, Fidyk also received official thanks from North Korea that year, during the Kraków festival, even as the documentary was gathering praise from various festivals for its anti-totalitarian message. Eventually, however, the real message of the documentary became transparent even to the North Korean regime, which resulted in Fidyk's classification as persona non grata in North Korea.

The documentary received the Willy De Luca Prize for Documentaries in 1989 at the Prix Italia. It also received the Grand Prix at the International Film Festival in Leipzig, Golden Ducate in International Film Festival in Mannheim, Srebny Lajkonik (Ogólnopolski Festiwal Filmów Krótkometrażowych in Kraków) and Złoty Ekran (Nagroda Tygodnika "Ekran") in Poland, all in 1989.

In 2008, Fidyk returned to this subject with another documentary on North Korea, Yodok Stories.
