= Koreans in Germany =

Total population
- 100,000 (2022)

Regions with significant populations
- Berlin · Frankfurt · Rhine-Ruhr metropolitan region (Düsseldorf · Cologne · Ruhr Area (Dortmund · Essen))

Languages
- Korean, German

Religion
- Mahayana Buddhism, Christianity

Related ethnic groups
- Korean diaspora

Koreans in Germany numbered 80,000 individuals as of 2009, according to the statistics of South Korea's Ministry of Foreign Affairs and Trade. Though they are now only the 14th-largest Korean diaspora community worldwide, they remain the second-largest in Western Europe, behind the rapidly growing community of British Koreans. As of 2010, Germany has been hosting the second-largest number of Koreans residing in Western Europe, if one excludes Korean sojourners (students and general sojourners).

The largest community of Koreans is situated in the Frankfurt-Rhine Main Area, which contains 5,300 residents. This area also contains German and European headquarters of large Korean companies such as Kia Motors, Hyundai, Samsung Electronics, LG International, SK Group, Nexen Tire.

== History ==
=== South Koreans ===
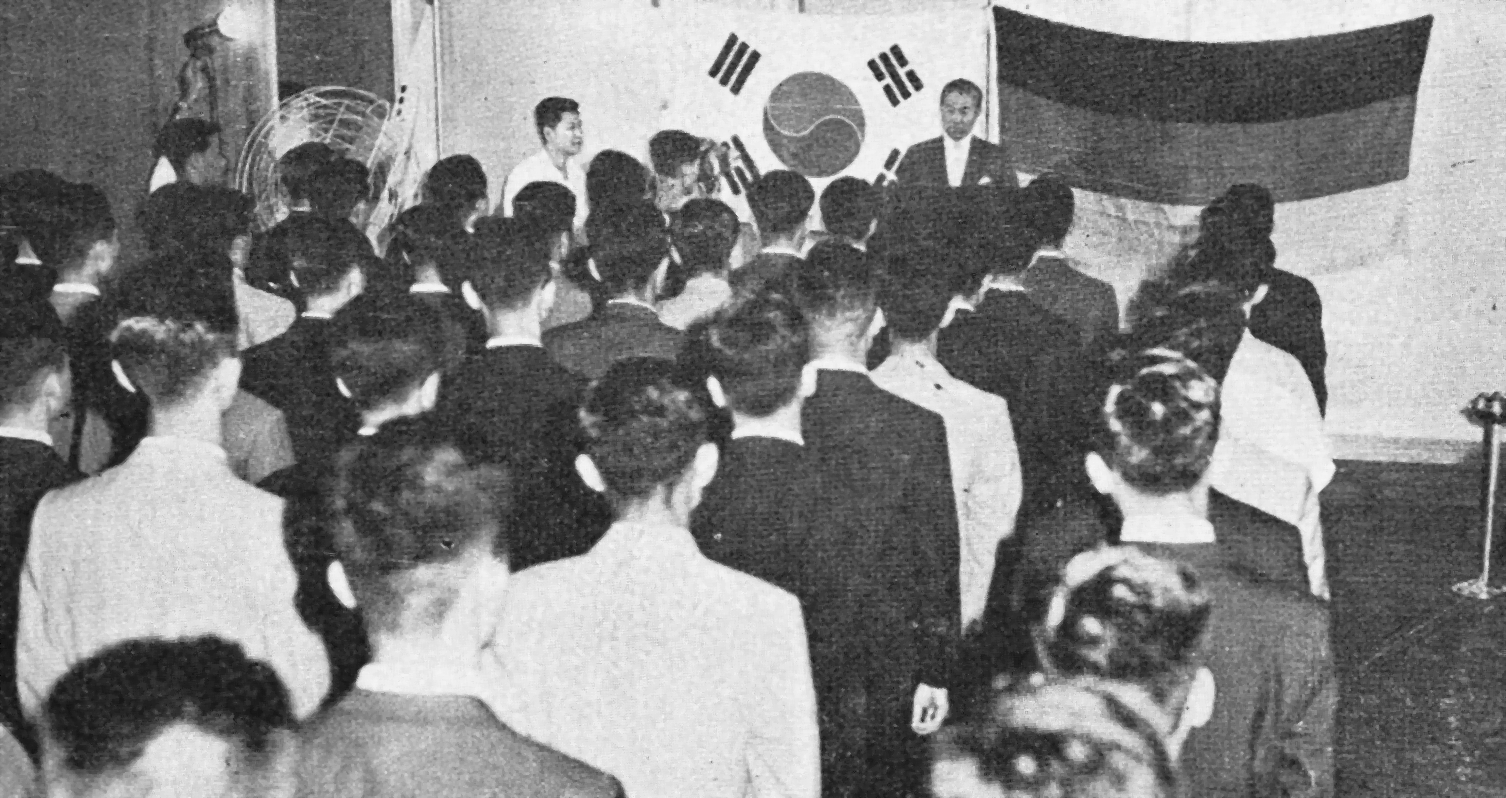
Kim Yu-taik, Chief of Economic Planning Board, addresses workers to be dispatched to Germany from South Korea. 1962-08-16.

Distribution of South Korean citizens in districts of Germany in 2021

Some students, nurses, and industrial trainees from South Korea had already been in West Germany in the late 1950s. However, mass migration did not begin until the 1960s, when West Germany invited nurses and miners from South Korea to come as Gastarbeiter; their recruitment of labourers specifically from South Korea was driven not just by economic necessity, but also by a desire to demonstrate support for a country that, like Germany, had been divided by ideology. The first group of miners arrived on 16 December 1963, under a program paid for largely by the South Korean government; German enterprises were not responsible for travel costs, but only for wages and language training. They had high levels of education compared with other Gastarbeiter of the same era; over 60% had completed high school or tertiary education. Nurses began arriving in large numbers in 1966. Koreans were one of the few non-European groups recruited; West German migration policy generally excluded workers of African and Asian origin during the 1950s through 1970s. After living in Germany, some Koreans migrated onwards to the United States under the relaxed entrance standards of the Immigration and Nationality Act of 1965. Though the South Korean workers came on limited-term contracts and most initially planned to return home, in the end, half of the workers enlisted ended up remaining in Germany. Throughout the 1970s, they staged protests demanding the right to stay, citing their contributions to the economy and health care system; in the end, the West German government refrained from expelling those whose work contracts had expired, instead letting them move on to other work.

North and South Korea vied for influence among the Korean community in West Germany during the 1960s and 1970s; North Korea sent operatives to West Germany disguised as professors in order to recruit among the Korean community there. In 1967, South Korea forcibly extradited, without the consent of the West German government, a number of Koreans suspected of spying for the North, the most famous of whom was composer and later German citizen Isang Yun. They were tortured to extract false confessions, and six were sentenced to death. West Germany expelled three South Korean diplomats in the aftermath of the incident, and seriously considered breaking off diplomatic relations with South Korea. However, they decided against it as the South's attention shifted to the assassination attempt on Park Chung Hee and the USS Pueblo incident, and instead worked quietly to ensure the release of those who had been kidnapped.

There has been a movement among South Korean miners in Germany in 2011 to let the South Korean government officially recognize their patriotic effort.

=== North Koreans ===
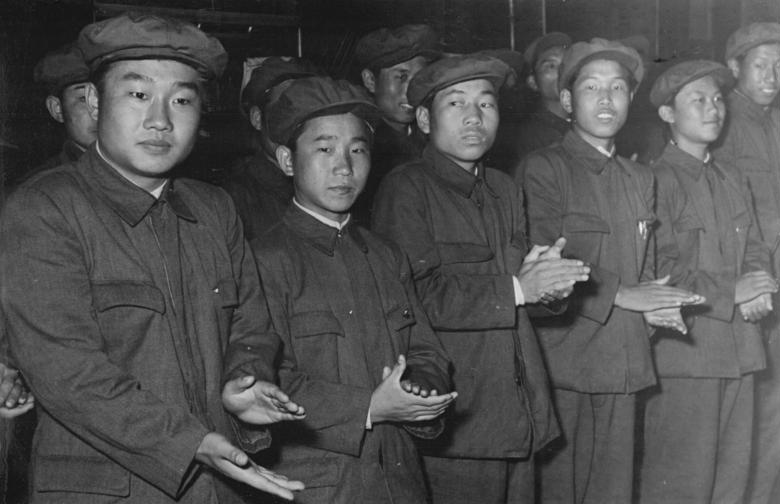
1953: North Korean guest students arrive in East-Berlin

Distribution of North Korean citizens in districts of Germany in 2021

There was also a Korean presence in East Germany, though it was much smaller. During the post-Korean War reconstruction period of North Korea from 1953 to 1962, many North Korean students enrolled in universities and colleges in the Soviet bloc, and others came as industrial trainees. In 1955, their numbers in East Germany were estimated at 334 students, 302 industrial trainees, and 298 orphans. However, as the Sino-Soviet split worsened, the North Korean government ordered nearly all of their overseas nationals to return home, and by 1962, few North Koreans were left in Germany. Even those who married locals obeyed the recall order and left their spouses behind; in one case, an East German woman was able to confirm that her North Korean husband was still alive after more than four decades without contact, but others have never seen or heard any information about their spouses since.

In the 1980s, relations between North Korea and East Germany improved again, and about 1,500 North Korean students came to East Germany. Even after the German reunification, the Pyongyang government continued to send some students to Germany for technical training; the two countries established formal diplomatic relations in March 2001, and Germans working in North Korea have reported meeting German-speaking engineers and technicians.

=== Return migration ===
Some Koreans settled in Germany have begun returning to South Korea after retirement, bringing German spouses with them; this return migration has resulted in the creation of the Namhae German Village in South Gyeongsang Province.

== Education ==
Over 70% of second-generation Korean descendants in Germany hold at least an Abitur or higher educational qualification, more than twice the ratio for the rest of the population (see also: Academic achievement among different groups in Germany). Outside of the regular educational system, Koreans in Germany are also served by 37 weekend Korean-language schools, the earliest of which, the Köln Koreans' School, was established on 10 April 1973. Further schools were founded in Aachen, Hamburg, Rüsselsheim, Düsseldorf, Neunkirchen, Bickenbach, Bochum, Hannover, Kamp-Lintfort, Krefeld, Dortmund, Germering and Hamminkeln in the 1970s, Essen, Berlin, Dudweiler, Kassel, Marl, Leverkusen, Oberhausen, Göttingen, Stuttgart, Wiesbaden, Bremen, Karlsruhe, Wuppertal, Augsburg, Heidelberg, Herzogenaurach, and Osnabrück in the 1980s, and Münster, Wolfsburg, Kiel, Freiburg, Siegen, and Rimpar in the 1990s. As of 2007, total enrollment in all Korean schools across Germany was 1,748 students.

== Notable people ==
- Cha Bum-Kun, noted football player in the Bundesliga, known as Tscha Bum ("Cha Boom").
- Unsuk Chin, composer.
- Caroline Fischer, pianist.
- Jens Castrop, football player for the Bundesliga team Borussia and the South Korean national football team; born in Düsseldorf.
- Martin Hyun, professional ice hockey player who played in Germany's Deutsche Eishockey Liga.
- Mike Leon Grosch, singer who was the finalist of Deutschland sucht den SuperStar.
- Bae Suah, author and translator.
- Ji-In Cho, musician and the lead vocalist and pianist for Krypteria.
- Byung-Chul Han, author, cultural theorist, and professor at the Berlin University of the Arts.
- In-Ah Lee, film director from Hamburg, now based in Los Angeles.
- Mirok Li, novelist who sought exile in Germany.
- Ill-Young Kim, moderator, stand-up comedian and actor.
- Kim Isak, singer and radio personality who was born in Germany but is mainly active in South Korea.
- Simone Hauswald, biathlete and 2010 Winter Olympics bronze medalist.
- Oh Kil-nam, economist who defected to North Korea with wife Shin Suk-ja and two daughters, then returned to Europe, Germany then Denmark, alone to seek political asylum.
- Song Du-yul, philosophy professor and former prisoner under South Korea's National Security Act.
- Isang Yun, composer and former political prisoner.
- Cha Du-Ri, footballer, son of Cha Bum-Kun.
- Teo Yoo, German-born South Korean actor.
- Moon Ga-Young, German-born South Korean actress.
