= Pierre Rigoulot =

French historian and author (born 1944)

- Born: 1944 (age 81–82)
- Occupations: Historian and author
- Writing career
- Notable works: The Black Book of Communism; The Aquariums of Pyongyang

Pierre Rigoulot (born 1944) is a French historian and author. The author of L'antiaméricanisme, he contributed to Stéphane Courtois' The Black Book of Communism and helped Kang Chol-Hwan write The Aquariums of Pyongyang. In 2006, he prefaced France Intox, published by Editions Underbahn.
