= Éditions Underbahn =

Publishing house

Éditions Underbahn is an American publishing house created in 2005 and specialized in French-language neoconservative texts.

== Fiction ==
- Le Désespéré, Léon Bloy, preface by Maurice G. Dantec ISBN 0-9774224-0-2
- September 11 Wall Street Sonnets and Other New York City Poems, Eugene Schlanger The Wall Street Poet ISBN 0-9774224-4-5
- 1984, George Orwell, Vietnamese translation by Dang Phu'o'ng-Nghi, ISBN 0-9774224-5-3
- Rave, Baptiste Landon

== Non-fiction ==
- La Bannière Étalée, Erik Svane, preface by Guy Millière ISBN 0-9774224-1-0; nominated for the Best Libertarian Book of 2005 by the ALEPS (Association for Economic Freedom and Social Progress)
- France Intox, Frédéric Valandré, preface by Pierre Rigoulot ISBN 0-9774224-3-7
- MO, Dang Phu'o'ng-Nghi, ISBN 0-9774224-2-9
- Houdna, Guy Millière, ISBN 0-9774224-6-1
- Justice : mise en examen, Frédéric Valandré, ISBN 0-9774224-8-8
