= Martin Christoph Redel =

Martin Christoph Redel (born 30 January 1947) is a German composer, music theorist, percussionist and university teacher.

== Life ==
Martin Christoph Redel was born in Detmold on 30 January 1947 as the son of the flutist Kurt Redel and the pianist Erika Redel-Seidler. He studied percussion with Friedrich Scherz and composition with Rudolf Kelterborn, Giselher Klebe and Johannes Driessler at the Nordwestdeutsche Musikakademie (today: Hochschule für Musik Detmold). He then continued his studies at the Hochschule für Musik, Theater und Medien Hannover with Isang Yun. In 1971 he became a lecturer in music theory and ear training at the Detmold Academy of Music. In 1979 he was appointed professor of composition and Redel led the Detmold Academy as rector from 1993 to 2001. In this capacity, he was also chairman of the Rectors' Conference of Germany's conservatoires and vice-president of the Association Européen des Conservatoires, Académies de Musique et Musikhochschulen (AEC). From 1992 to 2004, Redel was President of Jeunesses Musicales Germany, which subsequently appointed him its Honorary President and on whose behalf he directed the composition courses for young people at Schloss Weikersheim for more than 40 years.

His works have been interpreted by soloists such as Wolfgang Boettcher, Jörg Brückner, Rudolf Buchbinder, Thomas Christian, Karl Leister, Diemut Poppen, Thomas Quasthoff, Kurt Redel, Gerhild Romberger, Hansjörg Schellenberger, Hariolf Schlichtig, Wen-Sinn Yang or Karlheinz Zöller. Conductors such as Matthias Foremny, Karel Husa, Christoph Poppen, Stanislaw Skrowaczewski, Hans Stadlmair, Horst Stein, Michel Tabachnik, Räto Tschupp, Gilbert Varga and Jörg-Peter Weigle (among others) have conducted performances of Redel's works. He has performed with the Bamberg Symphony Orchestra, the Bavarian, Central German and North German Radio Symphony Orchestras, the SWR Symphony Orchestra, the Basel Radio Orchestra, the State Theatre Orchestras of Wiesbaden and Darmstadt, the Mannheim National Theatre Orchestra, the Gürzenich Orchestra of Cologne and the chamber orchestras of Munich, Heilbronn, Stuttgart, Pforzheim and Detmold. Chamber music and chamber ensembles such as the "ars nova ensemble" (Nuremberg), Brandis-Quartett, "das neue werk" (Hamburg), Ensemble Horizonte (Detmold), Ensemble Slavko Osterc (Ljubljana), Scharoun-Ensemble (Berlin), The Boston Musica Viva (Boston) or Trio Jean Paul played premieres and first performances.

Portrait concerts and lectures have taken him to the conservatoires in Bremen, Dresden, Lübeck, Munich and Saarbrücken, the Carl von Ossietzky University Oldenburg, the conservatoires in Łodz and Wrozław (Poland), the Birmingham Conservatoire of Music (UK), the Escola Superior de Música de Lisboa (Portugal), the Pontificia Universidad Católica de Chile (Santiago de Chile), Sangmyung University in Seoul (Korea) and the Music Department of Colorado College in Colorado Springs (USA).

As a composer, Martin Christoph Redel gained national and international recognition early on. His catalogue of works currently (2022) includes 97 works (orchestral works, chamber music, solo works for various instruments and vocal music). He has also appeared as a percussionist.

== Awards ==
- 1971: Annette von Droste-Hülshoff Prize of the Regional Association of Westphalia-Lippe
- 1972: Promotion Prize of the State of North Rhine-Westphalia for Music
- 1972: Promotion Prize of the State Capital Stuttgart (Dispersion for chamber ensemble)
- 1973: Promotion Prize for Young Artists of the State of North Rhine-Westphalia
- 1977: Promotion Prize of the Composition Prize of the Walter Kaminski Memorial Foundation (String Quartet II)
- 1977: Promotion Prize of the City of Mannheim for Young Artists (together with Wolfgang Rihm)
- 1977: Special Prize of the Music Critics at the "Rassegna Internazionale Gino Marinuzzi per Giovani Compositori" in San Remo/Italy (Strophes for Orchestra)
- 1978: Composition Prize of the "Sommerliche Musiktage Hitzacker" (String Quartet II)
- 1978: Promotion Prize of the Cultural Prize Silesia of the State of Lower Saxony
- 1978: "Mention d'Honneur" at the Prix Arthur Honegger, Paris (String Quartet II)
- 2008: "Menzione speciale" at the 6° Concorso Internazionale di composizione "Romualdo Marenco", Novi Ligure/Italy (Sonnet pour cornet)
- 2010: "Menzione speciale" at the 8° Concorso Internazionale di Composizione "Romualdo Marenco", Novi Ligure/Italy (Maskerade for alto saxophone solo)
- 2014: 1st prize at the 12° Concorso Internazionale di composizione "Romualdo Marenco", Novi Ligure/Italy (TrombOnly. Solo for tenor trombone)
- 2019: 2nd prize at the composition competition of the XX Weimar Spring Days for Contemporary Music (Disput for horn and orchestra). No first prize was awarded.
- 2020: "Mullord Award" (2nd prize) at the International Composition Competition of the Álvarez Camber Orchestra (London) for "Ferne Nähe - Requiem für Streichorchester" op. 91 (2017/18).
