= Jolyon Brettingham Smith =

British composer

- Born: September 9, 1949; Southampton, England
- Died: May 17, 2008 (aged 58) Berlin, Germany
- Education: University of Cambridge (Philosophy); Heidelberg University (Musicology); Berlin University of the Arts (Composition; pupil of Isang Yun)
- Occupations: Composer; conductor; violist; author; radio presenter; professor
- Years active: 1970–2008

Jolyon Brettingham Smith (9 September 1949 – 17 May 2008) was a British composer, conductor, performer, author, and radio presenter, and a university teacher at the Berlin University of the Arts.

== Life and work ==
Brettingham Smith was born in Southampton. His first employment, after he left school in 1966, was as a teacher at a London boarding school for children with learning difficulties. He then went on to study philosophy at the University of Cambridge as well as musicology and composition at Heidelberg and Berlin, where he was a pupil of the Korean-born composer Isang Yun.

Between 1970 and 1980 he played viola in the Gruppe Neue Musik Berlin and the NO SET Improvisation Ensemble. From 1973 until 1978 Brettingham Smith was artistic assistant professor at the Free University of Berlin. The Bielefeld Opera House engaged him as guest conductor for their 1975 season. In 1976 he began teaching as a full professor at the Berlin University of the Arts.

From 1978 Brettingham Smith began working as a writer and presenter for a number of public broadcasting organizations in Germany: he became well known for his presentation over many years of such radio programmes as Klassikforum on WDR, Klassik zum Frühstück on RBB, and Das Musikalische Quartett on SWR. His presentation was marked by a profound historical and technical expertise, for which his activities as university teacher, composer, and performer (as viola player) stood him in good stead. His humorous and occasionally self-mocking style earned Brettingham Smith great affection and esteem among his listeners.

Brettingham Smith lived with his wife and six children in the Spandau district of Berlin. He was famous for his early rising, beginning his day at 3.00 and reckoning the hours between then and 7.00 to be the best for composition.

His major compositions – which have been rewarded with a number of international prizes – include four operas and numerous works for orchestra and musical theatre, as well as chamber music, vocal works, film music, and the musical settings for radio plays.

Jolyon Brettingham Smith died in Berlin on 17 May 2008 immediately after concluding his Jolyon Live - The English Connection radio programme on Rundfunk Berlin Brandenburg (RBB).

== Compositions ==
Published works by Brettingham Smith include:

- Sonetto per Organo – for organ – op. 3 (1972)
- Songs for a Fool on Baile's Strand – for contralto and ensemble – op. 4 (1972)
- O Rise – for ensemble – op. 6 (1973)
- The Ruins of Time – for five percussion instruments – op. 9 (1974)
- The Death of Cuchulain – opera in one act – op. 5 (1975)
- Wind in the Reeds – five sketches for oboe, clarinet, and bassoon – op. 12 (1975)
- Dancing Days – for soprano and chamber orchestra – op. 13 (1975)
- Two Times Past – two pieces for flute and harp – op. 18 (1977)
- The Doors of Perception – for flute and four percussion instruments – op. 30 (1982)
- Approaches to Dun Aengus – for cello and orchestra – (1985)

== Bibliography ==
- Jolyon Brettingham Smith: Musical Bridges. A few Home Thoughts from Abroad. In: Music as a bridge. Musikalische Beziehungen zwischen England und Deutschland 1920 - 1950, hrsg. von Christa Brüstle und Guido Heldt, Olms, Hildesheim 2005, ISBN 3-487-12962-0, S. 1-16.
- Jolyon Brettingham Smith: "... das Leben ein bisschen besser zu ertragen ..." W. H. Auden und die Musik. 2007, Radio-Essay, SWR2, online file
- Friederike Schröter und Claus Gerlach (Hrsg.): Die Vierte Gewalt. Kulturverlag Kadmos, Berlin 2008, ISBN 978-3-86599-069-3, Interviews
