= Martin Hyun =

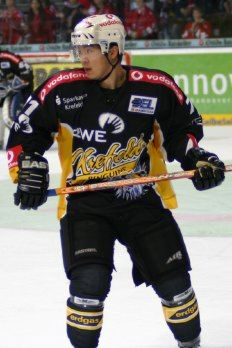
- Born: 4 May 1979 (age 46) Krefeld, West Germany
- Height: 5 ft 10 in (178 cm)
- Weight: 187 lb (85 kg; 13 st 5 lb)
- Position: Forward
- Shot: Left
- Played for: Krefeld Pinguine
- Playing career: 1996/97–2004/05

- Martin Hyun
- Hangul: 현종범
- RR: Hyeon Jongbeom
- MR: Hyŏn Chongbŏm

Martin Jong-bum Hyun (born 4 May 1979) is a German writer and retired professional ice hockey player who played in Germany's Deutsche Eishockey Liga. He was appointed technical coordinator and manager for the 2018 Winter Olympics by the PyeongChang Organizing Committee for the Olympic Games (POCOG) in the field of ice hockey and ice sledge hockey.

== Playing career ==
=== Amateur ===
The son of Korean immigrants in Germany, Hyun began playing ice hockey at the age of 5, progressing his way through local youth leagues and into the Krefeld Pinguine's youth development system. He became a regular player for the German Junior National Team. In 1997 he was summoned by Coach Miroslav Berek and General Manager Rüdiger Noack to begin the season with the Elite league team at the age of 17, where he scored two goals in five preseason games playing alongside former NHL player Peter Ihnačák (Toronto Maple Leafs). Hyun played most of the season with the second-league development team Eurohockey.com - all about European ice hockey. In 1998 Hyun decided to go to the United States to further his education and pursue his hockey career at the same time. He first studied at Benilde-St. Margaret's High School, a Catholic school in St. Louis Park, Minnesota, later transferring to Northwood Prep School in Lake Placid, New York.

After failing to be picked in the 1997 NHL Entry Draft during the World U-17 Championships in Moncton, Canada in 1997, Hyun put aside his pursuit of a professional NHL hockey career, and enrolled in Colchester, Vermont's Saint Michael's College, where he played NCAA Division II hockey.

=== Krefeld Pinguine ===
==== 2004–05 ====
Upon graduation in 2003, he entered a masters' program at the University of Kent's Brussels campus; while a student, he also played for a Belgian Hockey League team in Leuven. He returned to Germany in 2004 to sign with the Krefeld Pinguine. With his signing Hyun became the first Asian to ever make it to the highest professional league in Germany. He made his league debut on 17 September 2004 against the Cologne Sharks. Hyun chose to wear Number 71 to honour the accomplishments of Korean guestworkers in Germany. In April 2005 Hyun was invited by German President Horst Köhler to attend the state banquet in honour of the state visit of South Korean President Roh Moo-hyun.

== Retirement ==
After one season, Hyun retired from professional ice hockey to move to South Korea, where he worked with the National Assembly and the Ministry of Health and Welfare to promote Korean-German friendship. Though Hyun sometimes faced racism and exclusion in Germany, he stated that he felt even more like a stranger in South Korea; he returned to Germany to enroll in a doctoral programme at the University of Bonn, where he is writing his thesis on the experiences of the second-generation Korean youth in Germany. He also gained more experience in the political world with the German and European Parliament and the Ministry of Generations, Family, Women and Integration.

== Career as author ==
He has published a book entitled Lautlos-JA Sprachlos-NEIN (Silent-YES Speechless-NO) on the social integration experiences of second-generation Koreans in Germany. The book was published in 2008 by EB-Verlag Hamburg ISBN 978-3-936912-84-5. Five years later Hyun published his second book, Ohne Fleiß kein Reis - wie ich ein guter Deutscher wurde. The author explores issues central to the Asian German experience: the encounter of diverse cultures; the challenges of racism, discrimination, and exclusion. The author above all raises the question of becoming and being German with "slanted" eyes. His views on minorities and social integration led to him working at the radio station Deutschlandradio Kultur.

== Activism ==
In 2007 Hyun was selected among thirty young leaders with a foreign background to participate in the Bertelsmann-Foundation Leadership-Program in order to promote social integration of minorities in Germany. As a professional ice hockey player Hyun initiated a mentoring-project for children from low income families and helped children with cancer. On 10 October 2008 Hyun received a second invitation from German President Horst Köhler to talk about the demographic change and increasing diversity in Germany. In 2008 Hyun was appointed Goodwill Ambassador for the European Year of the intercultural dialogue, sponsored by the European Commission and European Parliament. In 2010 Hyun founded "Hockey is Diversity " an initiative to promote diversity outside the boundaries of sports.

== Winter Olympics 2018 ==
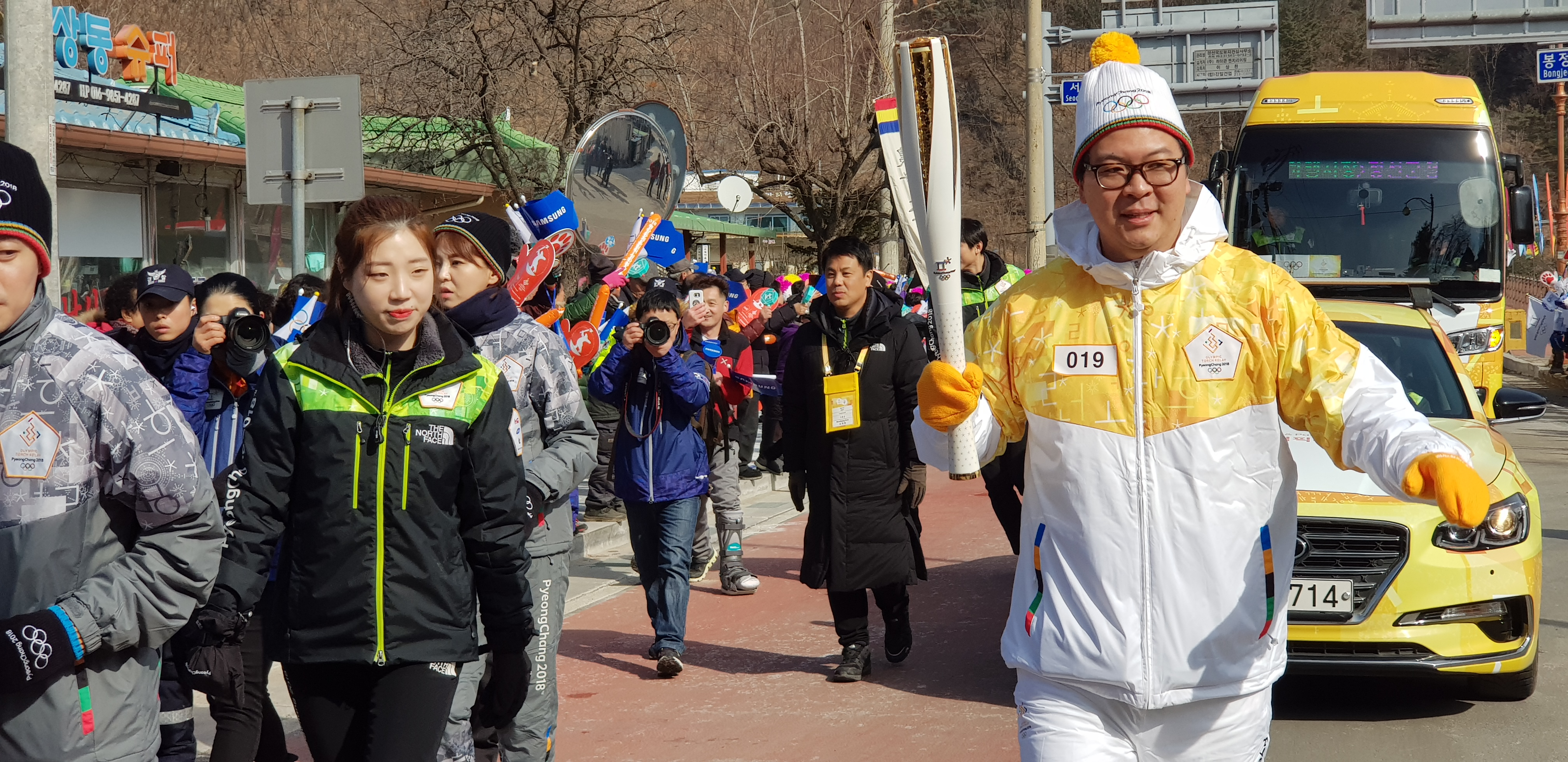
Hyun (right) in the 2018 Winter Olympic Torch Relay

In January 2015 Hyun with the recommendation of the International Ice Hockey Federation (IIHF) was appointed by the PyeongChang Organizing Committee of the Winter Olympics 2018 (POCOG) as their new technical coordinator for their men's and women's ice hockey and ice sledge hockey games. Hyun was selected as Olympic torch runner for his contributions to the development of Korean-German relations.

== Awards ==
- 1997: World U-17 Hockey Championships, Moncton, Canada
- 2002: ECAC Division II Northeast Champion, USA
- 2014: Integration Award for outstanding contributions in the field of social integration, awarded by SYNKO Synergie Köln e. V.(5 February 2014)

== Bibliography ==
=== Books ===
- Lautlos-Ja Sprachlos-Nein: Grenzgänger zwischen Deutschland und Korea (1998), released in German
- Ohne Fleiss kein Reis - wie ich ein guter Deutscher wurde (2013), released in German
- Gebrauchsanweisung für Südkorea (2018), released in German

== See also ==
- Ice hockey in Germany
- Sport in Germany
