= Yodok concentration camp =

Political prison camp in North Korea

Coordinates: 39°40′27″N 126°51′05″E

- Kwan-li-so No. 15 Yodok
- Chosŏn'gŭl: 요덕 제15호 관리소
- Hancha: 耀德第十五號管理所
- Revised Romanization: Yodeok Je Sipo-ho Gwalliso
- McCune–Reischauer: Yodŏk Che Sibo-ho Kwalliso

- Yodok concentration camp
- Hangul: 요덕 정치범수용소
- Hanja: 耀德政治犯收容所
- Revised Romanization: Yodeok Jeongchibeum Suyongso
- McCune–Reischauer: Yodŏk Chŏngch'ibŏm Suyongso

Location of Yodok camp in North Korea

Kwan-li-so (penal labour colony) No. 15 Yodok (/ˈjoʊdʌk, -dɒk, -doʊk/; Korean pronunciation: [jo.dʌ̹k̚]) (Note: Also romanized as Yodŏk, Yodeok or Yoduck); Chosŏn'gŭl: 요덕 제15호 관리소), often known outside North Korea as Yodok concentration camp, was a political prison camp in North Korea located in South Hamgyong Province. The camp was used to segregate those seen as enemies of the state, punish them for political misdemeanors, and put them to hard labour. It was closed down in 2014.

== Location ==
Yodok camp was about 110 km (70 mi) northeast of Pyongyang. It was located in Yodok County, South Hamgyong Province, stretching into the valley of the Ipsok River, surrounded by mountains: Paek-san 1,742 m (5,715 ft) to the north, Modo-san 1,833 m (6,014 ft) to the northwest, Tok-san 1,250 m (4,100 ft) to the west, and Byeongpung-san 1,152 m (3,780 ft) to the south. The entrance to the valley is the 1,250 m (4,100 ft) Chaebong Pass to the east. The streams from the valleys of these mountains form the Ipsok River, which flows downstream into the Yonghung River and eventually into the sea near Wonsan city.

== Description ==
Yodok camp had two parts:

- The total control zone (Chosŏn'gŭl: 완전통제구역), with the prison labour colonies Pyongchang-ri and Yongpyong-ri, was for people who authorities believed had committed crimes against the regime or whom had been denounced as politically unreliable (e.g. returnees from Japan or Christians). These prisoners were usually never released (unless they had relatives in Japan, in which case they were released after 10 years). The Christian mission organisation Open Doors estimated 6,000 Christians to be held in the camp.
- The revolutionary zone (Chosŏn'gŭl: 혁명화대상구역), with reeducation camps Ipsok-ri, Kuup-ri and Daesuk-ri, was to punish people for less serious political crimes (e.g. illegally leaving the country, listening to South Korean broadcasts, or criticising government policy). These prisoners were eventually released after serving their sentences.

In the 1990s, the total control zone had an estimated 30,000 prisoners while the smaller revolutionary zone had about 16,500 prisoners; later satellite images, however, indicate a significant increase in the camp's scale. Most prisoners were deported to Yodok without trial, or following unfair trials, on the basis of confessions obtained through torture. People were often imprisoned together with family members and close relatives, including small children and the elderly, based on guilt by association (Sippenhaft).

The camp was around 378 km^{2} (146 sq mi) in area. It was surrounded by a barbed-wire fence 3–4 m (10–13 ft) tall and walls with electric wire and watchtowers at regular intervals. The camp was patrolled by 1,000 guards with automatic rifles and guard dogs.

== Conditions in the camp ==
=== Living conditions ===
The prisoners lived in dusty huts with walls made of dried mud, a roof (rotten and leaking) made of straw laid on wooden planks, and a floor covered with straw and dry plant mats. In a room of around 50 m^{2} (540 sq ft), 30–40 prisoners slept on a bed made of a wooden board covered with a blanket. Most huts were not heated, even in winter, where temperatures are below −20 °C (−4 °F), and most prisoners got frostbite and had swollen limbs during the winter. Camp inmates also suffered from pneumonia, tuberculosis, pellagra, and other diseases, with no available medical treatment.

New prisoners received clothes that predecessors had worn until their deaths. Most clothes were dirty, worn-out, and full of holes. Prisoners had no proper shoes, socks, or gloves, and usually no spare clothes. The dead were buried naked because their possessions were taken by other prisoners. All prisoners were covered with a thick layer of dirt, as they were overworked and had almost no opportunity to wash themselves. As a result, the prisoners’ huts were foul-smelling and infested with lice, fleas, and other insects. Prisoners had to queue in front of dirty community toilets, one for every 200 prisoners, using dry leaves for cleaning.

The camp guards made prisoners report on each other and designate specific ones as foremen to control a group. If one person did not work hard enough, the whole group was punished. This created animosity among the detainees, destroyed any solidarity, and forced them to create a system of self-surveillance.

=== Slave labour ===
Men, women, and children performed hard labour seven days a week and were treated as slaves. Labour operations included a gypsum quarry and a gold mine, textile plants, distilleries, a coppersmith workshop, agriculture, and logging. Serious work accidents often occurred.

Work shifts in summer started at 4 a.m. and ended at 8 p.m. Work shifts in other seasons started at 5:30 a.m., but were often extended past 8 p.m. when work quotas were not met, even when dark. After dinner, prisoners were required to attend ideological re-education and struggle sessions from 9 to 11 p.m., where inmates who did not meet the targets were severely criticized and beaten. If prisoners could not memorize the teachings of Kim Il-sung, they were not allowed to sleep, or their food rations were reduced.

Most of the primary school children attended school in the morning. The main subject was the history of the revolution of Kim Il-sung and Kim Jong-il. In the afternoon they carried out hard labour with very high work quotas in terms of amount and intensity. Children were beaten with a stick for failure to meet the day's quota. Primary school children had to carry heavy logs 12 times a day over 4 km (2 1/2 mi) or dung buckets of 30 kg (66 lb) 30 times a day. Other children's work involved collecting 20 kg (44 lb) of plants in the mountains or cultivating 130–200 m^{2} (1,400–2,200 sq ft) of field. Sometimes children died in work accidents. Older children had to work all day and from age of 16, were assigned the same work quotas as adults.

=== Malnutrition ===
Prisoners were constantly kept on the verge of starvation. The daily rations for prisoners were between 100 and 200 g (3 1/2 and 7 oz) of corn boiled into gruel, served three times a day. Depending on the agricultural produce of the year, rations could be less. If prisoners did not finish their daily work quota or violate minor rules, the daily rations were reduced or temporarily discontinued, no matter if they were sick, crippled, or disabled. Prisoners killed and ate whatever wild animals they could catch, including rats, snakes, frogs, salamanders, worms, and insects, though they were severely punished if seen doing so by the guards. To avoid being detected, they mostly ate the meat raw, often without removing the skin. These wild animals were the only source of fat, as the food rations completely lack meat and plant oil. In particular, eating these animals helps to reduce pellagra caused by the lack of protein and niacin. Some prisoners sneaked into the pigsties and stole pig slops or picked undigested corn kernels out of animal feces in order to survive.

Lee Young-kuk estimates that at the end of the 1990s, around 20% of prisoners in Daesuk-ri died from malnutrition each year, with new prisoners arriving each month. All former prisoners say they frequently saw people dying.

== Human rights violations ==
=== Torture ===
The following torture methods are described in testimonies of former prisoners:

- "Pigeon torture": The prisoner's arms were tied behind their back, their legs tied together, and they were hung from the ceiling for several days.
- Forced water ingestion: The prisoner was strapped to a table and forced to drink large amounts of water. Guards then jumped on a board laid on the swollen stomach to force the water out.
- Immersion in water: A plastic bag was placed over the prisoner's head and they were submerged in water for long periods of time.
- Beatings: Prisoners were beaten every day if work quotas were not met, if they did not kneel down quickly enough before the guards, or just for the sake of humiliation. Prisoners often became disabled or died from the beatings. Even children were severely beaten and tormented.

Prisoners were completely at the guards’ mercy; guards could abuse them without restraint. Former prisoners witnessed a man being tied by the neck to a vehicle and dragged for long distances and a primary school child being beaten and kicked hard on his head. In both cases, the prisoners died soon after.

=== Executions ===
Prisoners released from Yodok were forced to abide by a written oath with a hand stamp. The pledge read: "I will face execution if I reveal the secrets of Yodok."

A common method of killing singled-out prisoners was to assign them an impossible workload. When the work was not finished, the prisoner's food rations were reduced as punishment. Eventually, the combination of heavy work and less food led to death by starvation.

Prisoners who violated camp rules (e.g. steal food or attempt to escape) were usually executed in public (barring those already shot). Summary executions took place in front of assembled prisoners several times each year; and every former prisoner testifies to having witnessed them. Before the execution, the prisoners were tortured and denied food. Those forced to watch the execution often could not endure the scene without protest and were killed as well.

=== Abuse and forced abortions ===
Women in the camp were completely unprotected against sexual assaults by the guards. Prisoners were often ordered to strip naked to be beaten and harassed, and a former prisoner said that it was routine for guards to sexually abuse female prisoners. The women sometimes died after being raped. Pregnant women were usually given forced abortions.

== Demand for closure ==
Amnesty International summarized the human rights situation in Yodok camp: "Men, women and children in the camp face forced hard labour, inadequate food, beatings, totally inadequate medical care and unhygienic living conditions. Many fall ill while in prison, and a large number die in custody or soon after release." The organization demands the immediate closure of Yodok and all other political prison camps in North Korea. The demand was supported by the International Coalition to Stop Crimes against Humanity in North Korea, a coalition of over 40 human rights organizations. As of 2014, the camp has been emptied and overhauled.

In 2018, North Korean Economy Watch, an affiliate of 38 North, posited that the prisoners had been moved to a mine farther south, at the Kowon mine.

== Prisoners (witnesses) ==
- Kang Chol-hwan (in Yodok 1977–1987) was imprisoned as a 9-year-old child because his family returned from Japan and was considered politically unreliable.
- An Hyuk (in Yodok 1987–1989) was imprisoned at the age of 18 because he illegally left North Korea.
- Kim Tae-jin (in Yodok 1988–1992) was imprisoned for alleged espionage after he spent 18 months in China illegally and converted to Christianity. Since camp rules prohibited gatherings of at least three people, Kim said he was tortured after he attempted to hold a meeting with other religious prisoners.
- Lee Young-kuk (in Yodok 1995–1999), former bodyguard of Kim Jong-il, was kidnapped from China and imprisoned because he illegally left North Korea and criticized the country.
- Kim Eun-cheol (in Yodok 2000–2003) was imprisoned at the age of 19 because he illegally left North Korea. He was part of a group of seven refugees returned by the Russian regime under Putin's rule to China, which in turn handed them over back to North Korea; the United Nations granted them refugee status but failed to protect them.
- South Korean citizens Shin Suk-ja and her daughters Oh Hae-won and Oh Kyu-won (in Yodok since 1987, when the daughters were ages 9 and 11) were imprisoned because her husband Oh Kil-nam did not return from a stay abroad. The family had been lured from Germany on North Korean agents’ false promises two years prior. Kang Chol-hwan and An Hyuk testified to meeting Shin Suk-ja during their imprisonments.
- South Korean citizen Jeong Sang-un (in Yodok since 2010) is an unrepatriated Korean War prisoner and was imprisoned at age 84 for illegally leaving North Korea.
- Kim Young-soon (in Yodok 1970–1979) was born in 1937 in Shenyang, Manchuria (China). She was a student of famed Korean dancer Choi Seung-hee, and was for a time a member of Pyongyang's elite. After Choi and her husband were purged in 1967, Kim continued to dance, but in 1970 she was imprisoned in Yodok without being informed as to why. She was released in 1979, and only long after being released learned why she had been imprisoned in the first place. She had once been best friends with Song Hye-rim, one of Kim Jong-il's lovers, and knowing about the relationship was presumably the reason for her internment. Kim Jong-il and Song Hye-rim's son, Kim Jong-nam, was later assassinated by North Korean hitmen in 2017. Kim Young-soon's mother and father both died of starvation while imprisoned in the camp with her. After enduring many horrifying incidents within the camp, including the deaths of her parents, she was released and spent the next 19 years living on the fringes of society. She escaped from North Korea to China in 2001 and arrived in South Korea in 2003. One of her sons died in Yodok while young; another was shot trying to escape to China in 1989, and one was recaptured several times before finally succeeding.

== In popular culture ==
- In 2001, Kang Chol-hwan wrote a non-fiction book The Aquariums of Pyongyang describing his childhood in Yodok camp.
- In 2006, Jung Sung-san, a North Korean defector, directed the musical Yoduk Story about Yodok camp.
- In 2008, Andrzej Fidyk made the film Yodok Stories about life in Yodok camp based on the musical and on witness accounts. North Korean refugees act in the film.
- In 2014, David Baldacci wrote the book The Target about a North Korean assassin from Yodok Camp.

== See also ==
- Human rights in North Korea
- Prisons in North Korea
- Shin Suk-ja
- Kaechon internment camp
- Camp 22
- Yoduk Story
