= Heavenly Dream School =

Coordinates: 37.46563°N 127.12771°E

- Seongnam

Information
- Type: Private School
- Established: 2003
- Principal: Im Hyangja
- Website: hdschool.org

The Heavenly Dream School (Korean: 하늘꿈학교) is a private alternate school for North Korean defectors located in Seongnam, South Korea. It is regarded as the first and most successful alternate school for North Korean defector youth, having produced over 160 graduates since its founding.

== History ==
The Heavenly Dream School (HDS) was founded in March 2003 by Rev. Im Hyangja. In 2015, the school was accredited by the Gyeonggi Provincial Office of Education. In 2017, the school held a 'Night of Thanks' in preparation for its 15th anniversary that involved school donors and graduates.

== Activities ==
The school focuses on preparing the defected North Korean youth for a successful career in South Korea and as leaders for reconstructing North Korea after unification. Educating the defectors is said to be difficult due to the differences in the South and North Korean educational and political systems. To handle this problem, the school focuses in a specialized program focusing on the student's academics, leadership, spirituality, and career. The students without family in South Korea live in dormitories around the school in small groups and are taken care by a school teacher or a volunteer.

The school organizes an annual English Unification Camp (EUC) in the summer where students from Heavenly Dream School and South Korea come together for 5 days. In the camp, they are exposed to the situation in North Korea and gain awareness on the issue of unification. The entire camp is conducted in English and features around 100 volunteer staff from over 10 countries.

In the winter, the school hosts a 10-day intensive leadership training in English known as DTS (Discipleship Training School). This camp features students from HDS and seeks to develop their leadership and English skills to help with unification with the help of volunteer staff.
