= 1969 Korean Air Lines YS-11 hijacking =

1969 aircraft hijacking and state-sponsored abductions

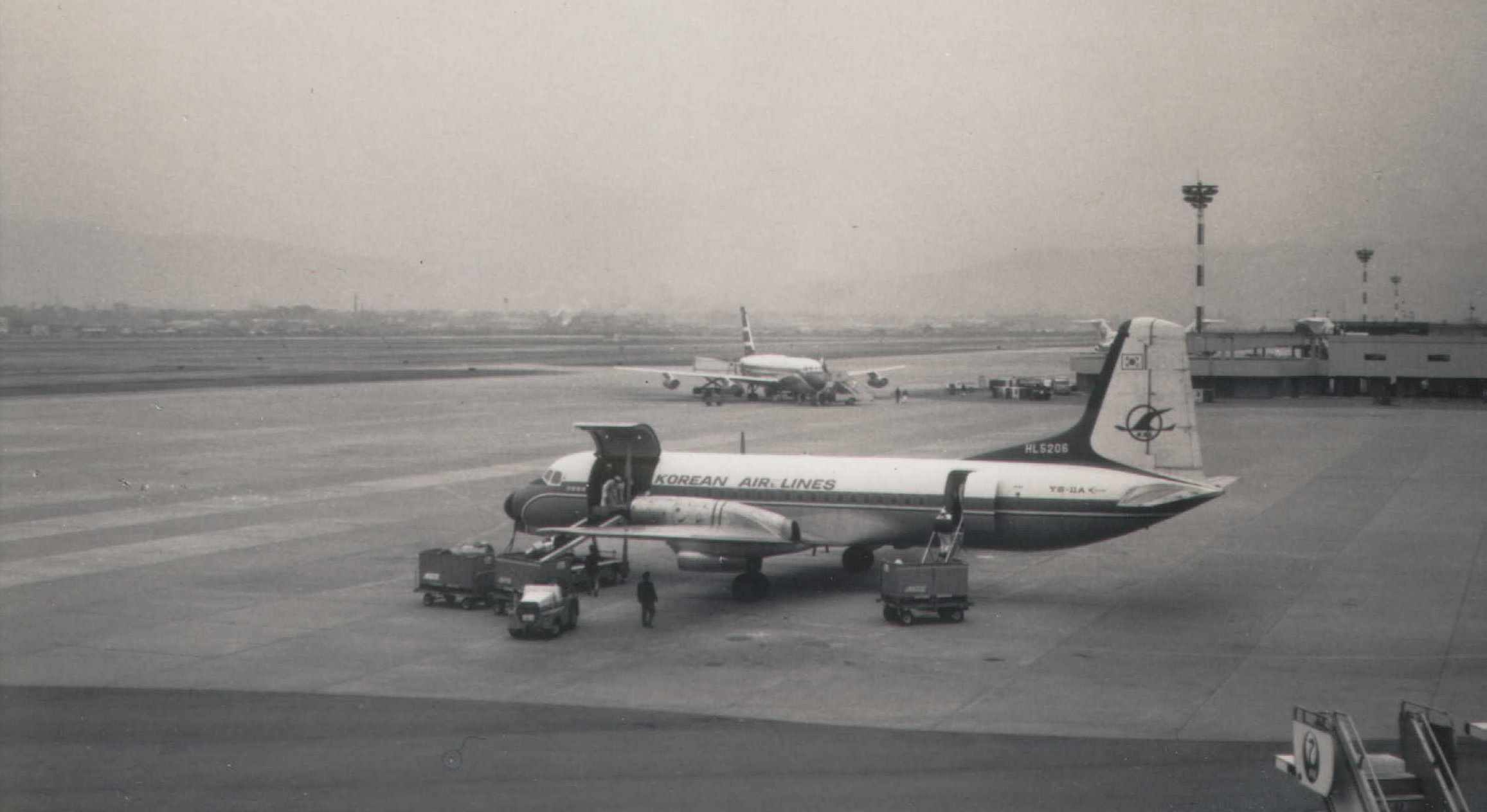
- A Korean Air Lines NAMC YS-11 registration HL5206 in 1971; it is similar to the one involved in the hijacking.

Accident
- Date: 11 December 1969
- Summary: Hijacking by North Koreans
- Site: South Korean airspace

Aircraft
- Aircraft type: NAMC YS-11
- Operator: Korean Air Lines
- Registration: HL5208
- Flight origin: Gangneung Airbase, Gangneung, Gangwon, South Korea
- Destination: Gimpo International Airport, Seoul, South Korea
- Passengers: 47
- Crew: 4
- Fatalities: 0 (presumed)
- Missing: 11? (Excluding hijacker. 2 passengers + 2 crew reported alive in North Korea since the incident. Remaining 5 passengers + 2 crew unknown.)
- Survivors: 51 (presumed, including hijacker and all abductees. 39 passengers were returned to South Korea.)

The 1969 Korean Air Lines YS-11 hijacking occurred on 11 December 1969. The aircraft, a Korean Air Lines NAMC YS-11 flying a domestic route from Gangneung Airbase in Gangneung, Gangwon, South Korea to Gimpo International Airport in Seoul, was hijacked at 12:25 PM by North Korean agent Cho Ch'ang-hŭi (조창희). It was carrying 4 crew members and 46 passengers (excluding Cho); 39 of the passengers were returned two months later, but the crew and seven passengers remained in North Korea. The incident is seen in the South as an example of the North Korean abductions of South Koreans.

== Incident ==
According to passenger testimony, one of the passengers rose from his seat 10 minutes after takeoff and entered the cockpit, following which the aircraft changed direction and was joined by three Korean People's Air Force fighter jets. The aircraft landed at Sǒndǒk Airfield near Wonsan at 1:18 pm. North Korean soldiers boarded the aircraft afterwards, blindfolded the passengers, and instructed them to disembark. The aircraft was damaged beyond repair on landing. A member of the United States Air Force in South Korea was scheduled to be a passenger on the flight, but instead took a military transport flight at the last minute. North Korea claimed that the pilots had flown the aircraft there to protest against the policies of then-President of South Korea Park Chung Hee. The passengers were subjected to attempts at indoctrination for up to four hours a day. The South Korean police initially suspected that the co-pilot conspired with two North Korean agents in the hijacking. The night after the hijacking, 100,000 South Koreans held a mass rally in freezing weather to protest against the hijacking, and burned an effigy of Kim Il Sung.

On 25 December, North Korea proposed to hold talks on the matter. Talks were finally held in late January 1970. Sixty-six days after the incident, North Korea released 39 of the passengers on 14 February through the Joint Security Area at Panmunjom, but kept the aircraft, crew and remaining passengers. The statements provided by the released passengers refuted North Korea's claims that the hijacking was led by the pilots; instead, they blamed one of the passengers. One man claimed to have looked out the window of the aircraft despite instructions from the North Korean guards, and saw the hijacker being driven away in a black sedan. Another passenger was reported to have become mentally deranged as a result of his captivity, and lost the ability to speak.

== Aftermath ==
The fate of most of the unreturned passengers has not been confirmed. They were educated, upper-class people; Song Yeong-in, formerly of the National Intelligence Service, commented at the families' committee inaugural meeting in 2008 that they were probably retained by North Korea specifically for their propaganda value. Oh Kil-nam, who defected to the North for a time in 1986, said that he met the two flight attendants as well as the Munhwa Broadcasting Corporation employees Hwang and Kim (see the list below) employed for making propaganda broadcasts to the South and that later he heard from his daughter that the captain and first officer were working for the Korean People's Air Force. The flight attendant Seong Gyeong-hui's mother was allowed to visit the North in 2001 to see her daughter as part of the family reunions agreed to in the June 15th North–South Joint Declaration; there Seong said that she and the other flight attendant Jeong Gyeong-suk remained friends and were living in the same town.

Son of unreturned passenger Hwang Won, Hwang In-cheol, who was only 2 years old at the time of the hijacking, set up the Korean Air Flight YS-11 Families Committee in 2008 to press the South Korean government to further investigate the issue. In 2009, he stated that he felt particularly "alienated" by the mass media attention shown to the 2009 imprisonment of American journalists by North Korea lasting 141 days, compared to the relative lack of coverage of the fate of his father, also a journalist, whom he has not seen in 40 years. In June 2010, he applied to the Working Group on Enforced or Involuntary Disappearances of the United Nations Human Rights Council to investigate the unreturned passengers as cases of forced disappearance; he spent six months preparing the application, with the help of his friends. In February 2012, he filed a lawsuit against the North Korean spy who kidnapped his father.

The tail number of the aircraft, HL5208, was retired as a result of the incident.

== List of unreturned passengers and crew ==
All four crew, as well as seven passengers, were not returned to the South. The ages listed are those as of the time of the hijacking.

1. Yu Byeong-ha (유병하, 38) of Seoul, captain
2. Choe Seok-man (최석만, 37) of Seoul, first officer
3. Jeong Gyeong-suk (정경숙, 24) of Seoul, flight attendant. Reported alive as of 2001.
4. Seong Gyeong-hui (성경희, 23) of Seoul, flight attendant. Confirmed alive as of 2001.
5. Lee Dong-gi (이동기, 49) of Miryang, manager of a printing company
6. Hwang Won (황원, 32) of Gangneung, programme director at Munhwa Broadcasting Corporation (MBC). Reported alive as of 1986.
7. Kim Bong-ju (김봉주, 27) of Gangneung, cameraman at MBC. Reported alive as of 1986.
8. Chae Heon-deok (채헌덕, 37) of Gangneung, doctor
9. Lim Cheol-su (임철수, 49) of Yanggu, office worker
10. Jang Ki-yeong (장기영, 40) of Uijeongbu, food industry businessman
11. Choe Jeong-ung (최정웅, 28) of Wonju, Hankook Slate Company employee

== In popular culture ==
The incident is mentioned at the beginning of the Korean film Hijack 1971, produced in 2024 and directed by Kim Seong-han. It is also mentioned with footage in the Korean film Good News (2025 film), directed by Byun Sung-hyun. This incident was also referred to in the beginning of the Korean political thriller series Made in Korea (TV series), directed by Woo Min-ho.
