= Academic achievement among different groups in Germany =

Overview of the academic achievement among different ethnic groups in Germany

Differences in academic achievement among different ethnic groups in Germany are topics that have drawn the interest of the German academic and scientific communities.

To properly understand ethnic group differences in academic attainment in Germany, it must be understood that different ethnic groups in Germany have different histories of immigration. For example, one reason why the Italians are doing so poorly is that most of their ancestors arrived as unskilled Gastarbeiter. However socioeconomic factors cannot explain all the differences. The Spanish, for example, also arrived as Gastarbeiter, but soon started moving up the social ladder. This difference has been attributed to culture.

In Germany Hauptschulen, Realschulen and Gymnasien (schools of the tripartite system) exist alongside comprehensive schools such as the Gesamtschule. Most of the studies presented in this article deal only with the schools of the tripartite system and do not consider students attending a comprehensive.

== Persons holding different citizenships ==
A study released by the OECD showed that immigrants in Germany perform much less well at school than their counterparts elsewhere, and they are also less likely to attend selective schools such as the Realschule or the Gymnasium (university preparatory school).

German scientist Dietrich Thränhardt commented that statements about immigrants were not meaningful, as immigrants come from a number of countries and immigrants from some countries were doing well, while others were doing poorly.

One of the groups performing least well were students of Italian citizenship, who were more likely to attend a special education school than a Gymnasium. Most Italian students attended a Hauptschule.

Students holding Spanish, Russian, Croatian, or Bosnian citizenship were more likely to attend a Realschule or a Gymnasium than they were to attend a Hauptschule. They were achieving as well as the Germans.

Students holding a Turkish passport were more likely to attend the Hauptschule (a school that teaches at a slower path than Realschule or Gymnasium), however some groups holding a Turkish passport such as the Alevi were more successful.

== Ethnic group differences ==
Second generation Greek students were more likely to attend a Gymnasium (college preparatory school) than their ethnic German counterparts. The same was true for students belonging to the Chinese or the Jewish-Russian minority.

No other ethnic group in Germany was as successful as the Vietnamese, 50% of whom attended a Gymnasium, and the Koreans, 70% of whom held at least a high school diploma or higher.

Educational attainment of Muslim students differed by ethnic group. While 50.2% of students from Iran attended either a Realschule or a Gymnasium, only 12.7% of Lebanese students attended one of those schools.

The following tables use the German grading system. 1 is the best grade, and 6 is the worst. Former Yugoslavian students will be considered as one group in the following tables; however differences exists between different ethnic groups from former Yugoslavia when it come to educational attainment.

Academic grades differed by ethnic groups:

Academic Grade received for performance in German language class (by ethnic group)

Academic Grade	Turkish	Italian	former Yugoslavian	person of German or partial German ancestry not born in Germany	person of German ancestry born in Germany
1.0 to 2.4	6.3%	6.7%	19.8%	22.3%	33.5%
2.5 to 3.0	18.9%	12.2%	18.9%	26.9%	26.2%
3.1 to 6.0	74.4%	81.1%	61.3%	50.8%	40.3%

Academic Grade received for performance in math class (by ethnic group)

1 is the best grade, and 6 is the worst.

Academic grade	Turkish	Italian	former Yugoslavian	person of German or partial German ancestry not born in Germany	person of German ancestry born in Germany
1.0 to 2.4	14.9%	11.1%	23.6%	33.7%	36.9%
2.5 to 3.0	20.5%	14.4%	20.8%	31.1%	24.7%
3.1 to 6.0	64.4%	74.4%	55.7%	35.3%	38.4%

Percentage of students accepted by a Realschule or a Gymnasium after primary school graduation by ethnic group (only students that attend Hauptschule, Realschule or Gymnasium are counted for this statistic; students that attend a comprehensive or another school are not counted)

School	Turkish	Italian	former Yugoslavian	person of German or partial German ancestry not born in Germany	person of German ancestry born in Germany
students accepted at a Gymnasium	8.6%	7.8%	20.8%	28.2%	34.5%
students accepted at a Realschule	16.2%	10.6%	19.8%	34.0%	30.1%
students attending a Hauptschule	75.3%	81.7%	59.4%	37.9%	35.4%

According to a study, academic grades played a vital role in determining whether a student was accepted at the Realschule or Gymnasium. However, academic grades were not the only factors influencing Realschule attendance. Even if grades were controlled, ethnic Germans were somewhat more likely to be accepted for a Realschule. Gymnasium acceptance however was not influenced by ethnic group if grades were controlled.

Immigrant children attending a primary school that was attended by other immigrant children showed poorer academic performance than immigrant children that attended a school that was less diverse. According to a study immigrant children were more likely than ethnic Germans to attend a school that underperformed other schools. Immigrant children that attended a primary school which had many immigrant students were less likely than students attending a less diverse school to be accepted at a Realschule or a Gymnasium. However another study found that:

In sum, frame of reference effects can be found for educational achievement (big-fish-little-pond-effect), but not for a class’s migration background.

Alba et al. found that while Turkish and Italian immigrants did worse than would be predicted by their IQs, that was not true for Greek immigrants.

== Differences between immigrants living in Eastern and Western Germany ==
Immigrants living in Eastern Germany are more likely to attend a Gymnasium and less likely to attend a special education school. In the East German state of Brandenburg, 44% of all students from immigrant backgrounds were awarded the Abitur. Thus students from immigrant backgrounds were more likely to be awarded the Abitur than ethnic Germans. Karin Weiss attributed the greater success of immigrants living in Eastern Germany to the fact that they had different countries of origin from immigrants in Western Germany. In Eastern Germany there are more immigrants from China and Vietnam, and their culture places more value on education than immigrants from other countries. Other factors contributing to the success of immigrant children were the fact that Eastern German immigrant children were more likely to attend a kindergarten than their Western German counterparts, and that teachers and schools in Eastern Germany did more to integrate immigrant children than those in Western Germany.

== Performance of immigrants in the PISA examination ==
Every three years, the Organisation for Economic Co-operation and Development (OECD) conducts worldwide evaluations of 15-year-old students, known as the Programme for International Student Assessment (PISA). PISA studies have revealed that youngsters of immigrant backgrounds living in Germany underperformed compared to their peers.

When compared to native German students, first-generation immigrants (born outside of Germany) perform well below the average of first-generation immigrants in the 17 countries considered. The gap becomes even larger among second-generation immigrants (children with at least one parent born outside the country). Among this group, German schools' performance was right at the bottom of the survey. The gap in performance was smallest in case of the performance on reading tests and biggest in the case of the performance on natural sciences tests.

Volker Hagemeister observes that immigrant children in Germany have much less mastery of the language than their counterparts in countries such as Canada or New Zealand, where English is spoken. Additionally, university-qualified immigrants are over-represented in many other countries compared to immigrants to Germany.

Mathematics performance at the PISA
	students without migration background	first generation immigrants*	second generation immigrants**
OECD-average	523	475	483
Germany	525	454	432
*born in a foreign country, parents from a foreign country – **born in the country, parents from a foreign country

However the fact that first-generation immigrants outperform second generation immigrants was a statistical artefact. First generation immigrants and second generation immigrants come from different ethnic groups. First generation immigrants were more likely to be so-called Aussiedler - families from Eastern Europe of full or partial German ancestry who decided to move back to Germany. Second generation immigrant youngsters were more likely to be Turkish, a group that was shown to underperform on standardized tests. Within every ethnic group, those who were born in Germany did better than those who were born outside Germany.

heritage		Mathematics performance at the PISA
former Yugoslavia	born in Germany	472
former Yugoslavia	born outside Germany	420
Turkey	born in Germany	411
Turkey	born outside Germany	382

== Effect of language skills ==
According to a study, poor language skills may not be to blame for poor performance of immigrants. The study indicated that the achievement gap between youngsters of immigrant backgrounds and youngsters without immigrant background was the smallest on the tests that required the most language and the biggest on relatively language free tests.

== Research on discrimination ==
According to the Progress in International Reading Literacy Study, students from ethnic German families were 4.96 times more likely than children from immigrant families to have their teacher write a letter that states they would make a successful transition into the Gymnasium. If only children who had the same reading scores were compared, ethnic German children were still 2.11 times as likely to receive that letter.

A study by Stanat et al concluded that immigrant children were not discriminated against. The reason why so few immigrant children attend the Gymnasium were poor reading skills. After adjusting for reading competency, children from immigrant families were as likely as children from native German families to attend the Gymnasium.

According to still another study:

After controlling for individual students’ competencies, e.g. their cognitive abilities, the common assumption that children with migration backgrounds are disadvantaged could not be confirmed. Even a high share of children in a class who do not speak German as a family language does not induce adversarial results in transition recommendations. In contrast, however, a concentration of high achievement orientation in a class indeed negatively affects transition recommendations: A high share of students with above-average academic achievement, cognitive abilities and achievement-oriented parents actually decreases students’ chances of getting into higher educational tracks (Realschule and Gymnasium instead of Hauptschule).

Still another study, the ELEMENT-study, compared four groups of students:

1. Students who spoke German as a first language and had at least one parent who was born in Germany
2. Students who had one parent born abroad and did not speak German as a first language
3. Students who had two parents born abroad and did not speak German at a first language
4. Students who had two parents born abroad and spoke German as a first language

The study could not confirm the assumption that immigrant children were discriminated against. After controlling for preconditions of learning (such as cognitive ability and number of books possessed by the parents) and performance and standardized reading and math tests provided by the scientists students of group 1, 2 and 3 had the same chances of being admitted at a Gymnasium. However, according to the study, children who had two parents that were immigrants but spoke German at home (group 4) might be slightly favoured by the system. Further research will be necessary in order to learn if that effect (group 4 is favoured) is real, as it was not significant.

== See also ==
- Education in Germany
- Immigration to Germany
- Demographics of Germany
