= Song Du-yul =

German philosopher and sociologist

- Hangul: 송두율
- Hanja: 宋斗律
- RR: Song Duyul
- MR: Song Tuyul

Song Du-yul (Korean: 송두율, born 12 October 1944) is a German philosopher and sociologist of Korean descent. A professor at the University of Münster, Germany, he has been a political exile from his native South Korea for over 40 years. Educated in South Korea, he left that country for Germany in 1967 to pursue higher education. He visited North Korea a total of 18 times while living in Germany, but did not return to the South until 2003. During his visit to the South that year, he was arrested, charged, and convicted of spying for the North under the South's National Security Act in a controversial court case; in the end, he was given a suspended sentence, and returned to Germany in August 2004.

== Early life ==
Song was born in Tokyo, Japan, to Korean parents. He underwent primary and secondary education in Gwangju before moving to Seoul to enter Seoul National University's Department of Philosophy. In 1967, he moved to West Germany, where he entered into a graduate programme at Heidelberg University. He later studied at Frankfurt University, where he wrote his thesis on The Understanding of Asia in Hegel, Marx, and Weber. Jürgen Habermas acted as his thesis advisor; he was also heavily influenced by the ideas of Peter Christian Ludz. He completed his doctoral studies in 1972, following which he took up a teaching post at the University of Münster, where he also completed in 1982 his Habilitation (German professorship) for sociology.

== Contact with North Korea ==
Song made his first visit to North Korea in 1973. His desire to see the North first-hand was heavily driven the political environment at the time in West Germany, where Ostpolitik, the official policy of engagement with East Germany, was gaining traction. According to his own statements, he became a member of the North's ruling party, the Workers' Party of Korea, at that time; he claimed that this was a requirement for entering North Korea in those days. He would visit North Korea 18 more times in the following years. Though he did not travel to the South at all during this time, he continued to pay attention to political events in his homeland; he organised large-scale protests in Berlin in 1980 over the violent suppression of the 1980 Gwangju Uprising, which culminated in a 1500-person march down the Kurfürstendamm, a main avenue in Berlin. In 1982, he began teaching at the University of Münster. He met Kim Il Sung personally in 1991; in 1994, he was the only South Korean to attend Kim's funeral (though he had already taken up German citizenship the previous year). He organized a total of six conferences for Korea's reunification in Beijing (1995–1999) and in Pyongyang (2003), attended by scientists from both parts of the divided county and from abroad.

Song attempted to make arrangements to travel to South Korea in May 2000 to attend memorial events commemorating the 20th anniversary of the Gwangju uprising. According to the North Korean-affiliated Zainichi Korean newspaper Choson Sinbo, he refused conditions placed on him by the South Korean National Intelligence Service, which included a demand that he make a written pledge to respect South Korean law; as a result, his plans to attend the memorial collapsed. In 2001, North Korean defector Hwang Jang-yop asserted that Song was actually a member of the Workers' Party of Korea's Politburo under the alias Kim Chol-su. In response, Song initiated a lawsuit against Hwang in the Seoul 16th District Court, alleging that Hwang's statements constituted libel. Song did not return to the South for this case; his lawyer An Sang-un appeared in court on his behalf. A court ruling in August 2001 recognised that Hwang's statement had no basis in fact, but denied Song's request for payment of damages; the following month, Song announced that he would not appeal the ruling, as he was satisfied with the court's affirmation that he was not Kim Chol-su.

== Return to South Korea and trial ==
Song finally returned to South Korea in September 2003 for the first time in 37 years at the invitation of the Korea Democracy Foundation; his itinerary was to include a meeting with then-President Roh Moo-hyun. However, upon his arrival, the National Intelligence Service immediately picked him up for interrogation; they accused him of being a spy for North Korea, pointing to Hwang's claim that he was actually Kim Chol-su as justification. The South Korean police arrested Song on 22 October; he was indicted on 15 November on charges of membership in an anti-state organisation, fleeing to a region under control of an anti-state organisation, aiding an anti-state organisation, and attempted fraud in relation to his libel suit against Hwang. At his trial, the witnesses against him included a number of South Korean scholars in Germany whom he had allegedly influenced to engage in pro-North activism, including Oh Kil-nam, who had defected to North Korea but then returned to the South.

Pyongyang initially refrained from comment on the trial, sparking speculation that Song had cut his ties with the North; however, the official Korean Central News Agency eventually came out with harsh criticisms of the trial in 2004, calling the Grand National Party "traitors to the nation" for taking the lead in the legal action against Song and accusing the South of violating the June 15th Joint Declaration by charging him under the National Security Act. He was convicted on 30 March 2004 and sentenced to seven years' imprisonment in a ruling which drew criticism from Amnesty International. Song appealed the sentence; the appeal court ruling on 21 July upheld two of the five initial counts, those for spying and fraud; his sentence was suspended for five years, and he was permitted to leave the country. After a visit to Gwangju and Jeju, he departed for Germany on 5 August 2004.

== Works ==
- Song, Du-Yul; (2026). Bruchlinien der Moderne: Grenzgänge zwischen Asien und Europa (in German), Würzburg Verlag K & N, ISBN 978-3-8260-9711-3.
- Song, Du-Yul; Wernig, Rainer (2012). Korea: von der Kolonie zum geteilten Land (in German). Wien ProMedia. ISBN 978-3-85371-340-2.
- Song, Du-yul; Choe, Hyonduk; Wernig, Rainer (2004). Wohin steuert Nordkorea? Soziale Verhältnisse — Entwicklungstendenzen — Perspektiven (in German). Papyrossa Verlagsges. ISBN 3-89438-309-7.
- Song, Du-yul (2002). Schattierungen der Moderne (in German). Köln: Papyrossa Verlagsges. ISBN 3-89438-255-4.
- Song, Du-yul (1995). Korea-Kaleidoskop (in German). Osnabrück: Secolo. ISBN 3-929979-19-5.
- Song, Du-yul (1993). "Wiedervereinigungsfragen Koreas in internationalen Umfeld und unter regionalen Aspekten". In Moltmann, B.; Wernig, R. (eds.). Deutschland und Korea. Begegnung in der Teilung. Kommunikation ohne Unterwerfung (in German). Hannover: Arnoldshainer Protokolle No. 2. pp. 59–71. OCLC 33475353.
- Song, Du-yul; Rainer, Werning (1990). Kapitalismus, soziale Bewegungen und Gesellschaftsformation in Südkorea (in German). Eilinghoff: Norbert. ISBN 3-923881-41-X.
- Song, Du-yul (1990). Metamorphosen der Moderne (in German). Münster: Wurf. ISBN 3-923881-36-3.
- Song, Du-yul (1988). Zur Archäologie der Postmoderne : Begegnung zwischen Orient und Okzident (in German). Berlin: East Asian Institute, Free University of Berlin. OCLC 75347443.
- Song, Du-yul (1988). Aufklärung und Emanzipation : die Bedeutung der asiatischen Welt bei Hegel, Marx und Max Weber (in German). Berlin: Express. ISBN 9783885484264. — a revised version of Song's dissertation (Song 1972)
- Song, Du-yul (1985). Ist Japan ein Modell für Deutschland? (in German). Berlin: Schiller. ISBN 3-925067-51-5.
- Song, Du-yul (1985). Politik und Gesellschaft in der Republik Korea (in German). Offenbach/Main: Korea Forschungsgemeinschaft. OCLC 46021243.
- Song, Du-yul (1984). Südkorea: auf den Spuren der Japaner? (in German). Offenbach/Main: Korea Forschungsgemeinschaft. OCLC 8462959.
- Song, Du-yul (1984). Sowjetunion und China (in German). Frankfurt/Main: Campus-Verlag. ISBN 3-593-33351-1.
- Song, Du-yul. "Is the Japanese Model an Alternative?". Telos. 52 (Summer). ISSN 0090-6514.
- Song, Du-yul; Cho, M. Y. (1980). Wachstum, Diktatur und Ideologie in Korea (in German). Bochum: Studienverlag Brockmeyer. ISBN 9783883391038.
- Dissertation: Song, Du-yul (1972). Die Bedeutung der asiatischen Welt bei Hegel, Marx und Max Weber (in German). Frankfurt/Main: Frankfurt University. OCLC 1012781.
