= Andrzej Fidyk =

Polish film director

Andrzej Fidyk (born in 1953, Warsaw) is a Polish documentary filmmaker, producer, and professor of the Krzysztof Kieślowski Film School in Katowice. He is best known for work his 1989 documentary Defilada (The Parade), which depicts the mass parades choreographed to celebrate the fortieth anniversary of the Democratic People's Republic of Korea (North Korea) in 1988.

== Biography ==
Initially, Fidyk planned to be an economist. During 1972 and 1977 he studied foreign trade at the Central School of Planning and Statistics at the Warsaw School of Economics. After graduation, he worked at the Foreign Trade Bureau for two years, work which he hated

He first started working for television in 1980, since when he has made over 40 documentary films shown primarily on Polish and British television. From 1991 to 1996 he worked for the BBC in the Music and Arts Department. Between 1996 and 2004 he was Head of Documentaries at Polish Television.

== Filmography ==
1982

- Idzie Grześ przez wieś, production, script,

1983

- Optymistyczny film o niewidomych, director,

1984

- Ich teatr, director, script,

1985

- Prezydent, director,

1986

- Noc w pałacu, director, script,
- Praga, director, script,

1987

- Królewna Śnieżka, telefon i krowa, director, script,

1988

- Paryż, miasto kontrastów, director, script,

1989

- Defilada, production, script,

1990

- Ostatki, script, production

1993

- Sen Staszka w Teheranie, director, script,

1994

- Niebo oplutych, production,
- Pocztówka z Japonii, production, script,
- The Russian Striptease, director, production,

1995

- Carnaval. The Biggest Party In The World, production, production,
- Ostatki, production, script,

1997

- Ciężar nieważkości, editing,
- Cross, art consultation,
- Dziewczyny z Szymanowa, production,
- East Of Eastenders, director,
- Historia Jednej Butelki, art consultation,
- Jeden dzień z życia Tomka Karata, art consultation,
- Kanar, production,
- El Porvenir de Una Ilusion, production,

1998

- Dotknięci, art consultation,
- Ganek, production,
- Kiniarze z Kalkuty, director, script, production,
- Marzenia i śmierć, art consultation,

1999

- 24 dni, production,
- Oni, editing,
- Takiego pięknego syna urodziłam, art consultation,
- Twarzą w twarz z Papieżem, editing,
- 1989-1999 w dziesiątkę, editing,

2000

- Jan Paweł II w Ziemi Świętej, editing,
- Ziemia podwójnie obiecana. Jan Paweł II w Ziemi Świętej
- Ślub w Domu Samotności, editing,
- Taniec trzcin, production, script,

2001

- Prawdziwe psy (TV documentary/novel), editing,
- Serce Z Węgla, editing,

2002

- Bobrek Dance, editing,
- Mój syn Romek, editing,
- Przedszkolandia (TV documentary/novel), editing,

2003

- Imieniny, art consultation,

2008

- Yodok Stories, director i script,

2009

- Balcerowicz. Gra o wszystko, director, script.

2016

- Lech Walesa, A Portrait, director.
