= Yodok Stories =

- Poster
- Release date: 2008
- Country: Norway
- Languages: English; Korean

Yodok Stories is a documentary film directed by Polish documentary screenwriter and director Andrzej Fidyk and produced by Torstein Grude. Today, more than 200,000 men, women and children face torture, starvation and murder in North Korea's concentration camps. Few survive the atrocities, yet the camps' population is kept stable by a steady influx of new persons considered to be 'class enemies'.

A small group of people have managed to escape the camps and begin a new life in prosperous South Korea. The film follows some of these refugees who despite fear of persecution and death threats produce an extraordinary musical about their experiences in the Yodok concentration camp.

== Awards ==
Yodok Stories won the Planet Doc Review, Youth Jury Award in Poland, The "In the spirit of freedom" award at Jerusalem Film Festival and the Bergen International Film Festival, Youth Jury's Documentary Award in 2008. The film has been screened at numerous film festivals worldwide, including the Tribeca Film Festival and Sheffield Doc/Fest in 2009.
