= An Hyuk =

North Korean defector

- Hangul: 안혁
- Hanja: 安赫
- RR: An Hyeok
- MR: An Hyŏk

An Hyuk (Korean: 안혁; born 1968) is a North Korean defector.

== Escape from North Korea ==
He formerly lived as an expatriate in China, and repatriated to North Korea in 1986; however, he was accused of spying, and imprisoned at the Yodok concentration camp. He was released in 1989 alongside Kang Chol-Hwan, whom he met while interned at Yodok. The two became friends and had found interest in foreign broadcasting. He was quite interested in outside information and eventually got involved in anti-government activity. He was later identified and watched by the government; fearing he would be sent back to the concentration camp, he planned his escape.

In 1992, he and Kang escaped from North Korea by crossing the Yalu River into China. They arrived in South Korea in late 1992 and has resided there in Seoul.

The hardest challenge for them was getting on the train to the border of China undetected. All of the North Korean trains were monitored by the authorities. To gain passage, they had to bribe the police to gain permission to travel. Eventually, they made it to the border city of Chanbai, China near Hyesan, North Korea, where they stayed temporarily, making numerous deals with the North Korean military there by buying them beer and drinks. Later, the North Korean military informed them there was a changing of the guard at 2 AM. An Hyuk and Kang took their chance and crossed the river into China without any complications. After they made it across, North Korean patrols came looking for them, searching for about a week. They hid in China for about 6 months and eventually made their way to Dalian, where some ethnic Koreans helped them get passage to South Korea.

== Internet broadcasting ==
In 2002, he established the company Televi inc. and started an internet program called showboo (www.showboo.com). Besides his own program to bridge the gap between the two Koreas, the show hosted segments from South Korean celebrities like Tak Jae-hoon, Park Sang-min, Hong Rok-gi, and Kim Jung-min.

== Film ==
In 2012, he produced and invested in a documentary film about North Korean human rights called '48M' with the title of the film referring to the shortest distance that is possible to cross the Yalu River. The film had a special screening at the United States House of Representatives with the funding of North Korean human rights activist Suzanne Scholte and it was also specially screened at the United Nations human rights committee in Geneva.

== Awards ==
Along with Kang and Lee Soon-ok, who was imprisoned in Kaechon concentration camp, he received the Democracy Award from the United States' National Endowment for Democracy in July 2003.

== Publications ==
- Kang Chol-hwan; An Hyuk (1993), 대왕의제전 [The King's Festival] (in Korean), Seoul: 향실, ISBN 978-89-85523-01-1, OCLC 29999004
- An Hyuk (1995), 요덕리스트 [Yodok List] (in Korean), Seoul: 천지미디어, ISBN 978-89-86144-02-4, OCLC 45322350
