= Kang Chol-hwan =

North Korean defector (born 1968)

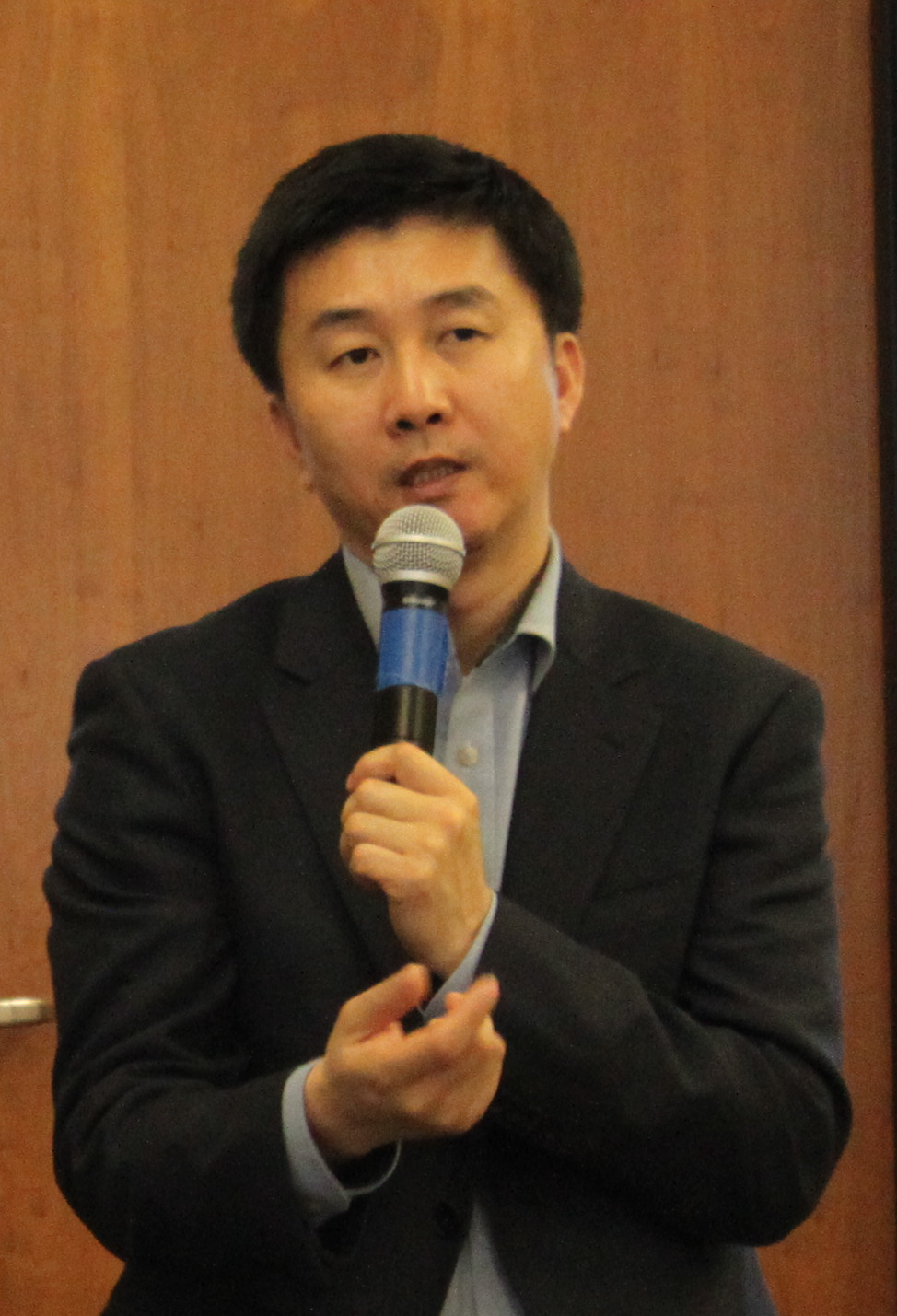
- Kang in 2014
- Born: 18 September 1968 (age 58); Pyongyang, North Korea
- Awards: Democracy Award (United States government - National Endowment for Democracy)

Korean name
- Hangul: 강철환
- Hanja: 姜哲煥
- RR: Gang Cheolhwan
- MR: Kang Ch'ŏrhwan

Kang Chol-hwan (Korean: 강철환; pronounced [ka̠ŋ tɕʰʌ̹l.βʷa̠n]; born 18 September 1968) is a North Korean defector, author, and the founder and president of the North Korea Strategy Center.

As a child, he was imprisoned in the Yodok concentration camp for 10 years. After his release he fled the country, first to China and eventually to South Korea. He is the author, with Pierre Rigoulot, of The Aquariums of Pyongyang and worked as a staff writer specialized in North Korean affairs for The Chosun Ilbo.

== Early life ==
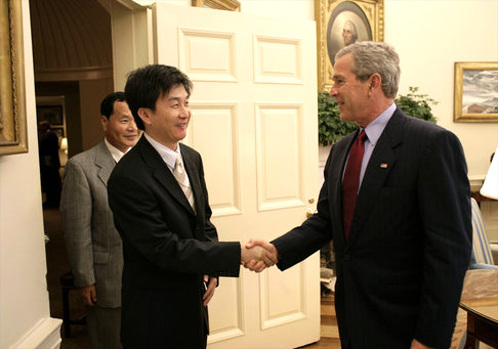
Kang meeting with U.S. President George W. Bush in June 2005.

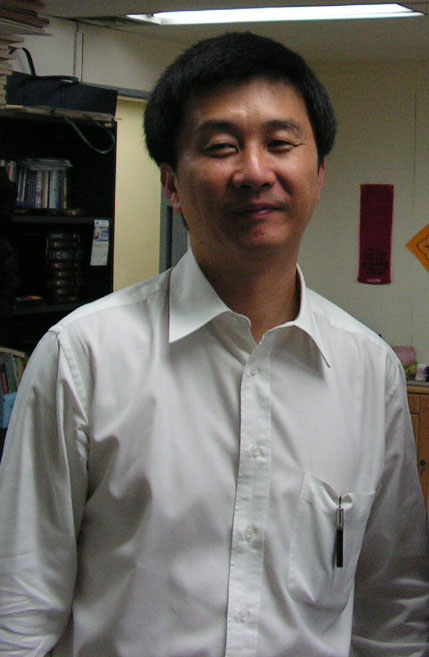
Kang in 2008

Kang was born in Pyongyang, North Korea, and spent his childhood there. He had a good relationship with his grandfather. He had a happy childhood. His family lived in relative luxury from his grandfather's position and the fortune that he had given to the country upon the family's return from Japan. Though they had never renounced their North Korean citizenship and Kang's grandmother had been a staunch party member in both countries, Kang has stated that the family remained under a cloud of suspicion for having lived in Japan.

== Concentration camp ==
In 1977, when Kang was seven years old, he was sent to a prison camp along with his family for 10 years after his grandfather was purged. Only Kang's mother, the daughter of a successful North Korean spy, was spared. Kang stated that he believes his grandfather was purged either because he opposed Han Duk-su, the leader of the Chongryon, while living in Japan, or because he was implicated in opposition to Kim Jong-il being designated as the official successor to the leadership of North Korea.

Kang's autobiography describes a brutal life in a North Korean prison. Death from starvation or exposure to the elements was common, with routine beatings and other punishments. His education consisted almost solely of memorizing the sayings and speeches of Kim Il Sung; at 15, his education ceased and he was assigned to exhausting and dangerous work details, and was made to view public executions. He said of the camps, "It was a life of hard labour, thirty percent of new prisoners would die. And we were so malnourished, we would eat rats and earthworms to survive."

Kang was released due to an order by Kim Jong-Il that those in the prison with relatives in Japan had to be released after 10 years. In the mid-1980s North Korea depended heavily on foreign currency remittances, with many Zainichi Koreans sending remittances to North Korea. They opposed the imprisonment of their relatives in North Korea, causing the amount of remittances being sent from Japan to North Korea to drop due to the wave of mass imprisonment. As such Kang was released from the prison camp after 10 years. Upon his release, he was sent to live in Yodok village. He could not go all the way back to Pyongyang, but he moved to Pyongsong, near Pyongyang. He moved in with his uncle who was working at the National Science Research Institute in the city.

== Escape ==
In 1992, Kang and An Hyuk escaped from North Korea by crossing the Yalu River into China. In late 1992, Kang arrived in South Korea and moved to the capital Seoul.

After publishing The Aquariums of Pyongyang, Kang met with US President George W. Bush and British Foreign Secretary Jack Straw. He has spoken with several organizations about human rights in North Korea and visited Japan for a discussion about abductees. Along with An and Lee Soon-ok, who was imprisoned in Kaechon concentration camp, he received the Democracy Award from the United States' National Endowment for Democracy in July 2003.

Kang has not been in contact with his family since he defected. In 2011, it was assumed that his sister, Mi-ho, and her 11-year-old son were in Yodok concentration camp, having been sent back there as retaliation for Kang's defection.

== Bibliography ==
- Kang, Chol-Hwan (2001). The Aquariums of Pyongyang. Basic Books, 2001. ISBN 0-465-01102-0.
- "Give Us An 'Eclipse Policy'", The Wall Street Journal, July 13, 2005.

== See also ==
- Human rights in North Korea
- Political prisoner
