= List of concentration and internment camps =

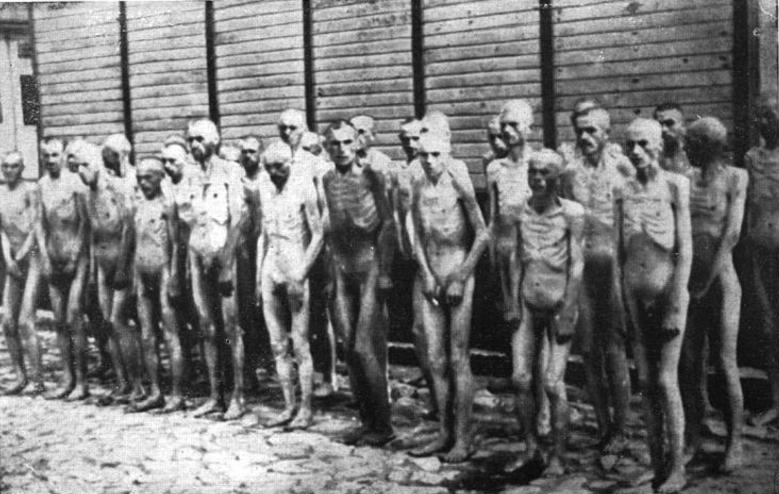
Soviet POWs standing before one of the huts in Mauthausen concentration camp

This is a list of internment and concentration camps, organized by country. In general, a camp or group of camps is designated to the country whose government was responsible for the establishment and/or operation of the camp regardless of the camp's location, but this principle can be, or it can appear to be, departed from in such cases as where a country's borders or name has changed or it was occupied by a foreign power.

Certain types of camps are excluded from this list, particularly refugee camps operated or endorsed by the United Nations High Commissioner for Refugees. Additionally, prisoner-of-war camps that do not also intern non-combatants or civilians are treated under a separate category.

== Argentina ==
During the Dirty War which accompanied the 1976–1983 military dictatorship, there were over 300 places throughout the country that served as secret detention centres, where people were interrogated, tortured, and killed. Prisoners were often forced to hand and sign over property, in acts of individual, rather than official and systematic, corruption. Small children who were taken with their relatives, and babies born to female prisoners later killed, were frequently given for adoption to politically acceptable, often military, families. This is documented by a number of cases dating since the 1990s in which adopted children have identified their real families.

These were relatively small secret detention centres rather than actual camps. The peak years were 1976–78. According to the report of CONADEP (Argentine National Commission on the Disappearance of Persons) Report. 8,960 were killed during the Dirty War. It states that "We have reason to believe that the true figure is much higher" which is due to the fact that by the time they published the report (in late 1984) the research wasn't fully accomplished; human rights organizations today consider 30,000 to be killed (disappeared). There was a total of 340 secret detention centres all over the country's territory.

== Australia ==
=== World War I ===
During World War I, 2,940 German and Austrian men were interned in ten different camps in Australia. Almost all of the men listed as being Austrians were from the Croatian coastal region of Dalmatia, then under Austrian rule.

In 1915 many of the smaller camps in Australia closed, with their inmates transferred to larger camps. The largest camp was Holsworthy Internment Camp at Holsworthy. Families of the interned men were placed in a camp near Canberra.

=== World War II ===
During World War II, internment camps were established at Orange and Hay in New South Wales for ethnic Germans in Australia whose loyalty was suspect; German refugees from Nazism including the "Dunera boys"; and Italian immigrants, many were later transferred to Tatura in Victoria (4,721 Italian immigrants were interned in Australia).

=== Modern day ===
The Department of Immigration and Border Protection currently jointly manages two immigration centres on Nauru and Manus Islands with the host governments of Nauru and Papua New Guinea, for the indefinite detention of asylum seekers attempting to reach Australia by boat. The claims of the asylum seekers to refugee status are processed in these centres. They are a part of the Australian government's policy that asylum seekers attempting to reach Australia by boat will never be permitted to settle in Australia, even if they are found to be refugees, but may be settled in other countries. The clear intention of the Australian government's policy is to deter asylum seekers attempting to reach Australia by boat. The great majority of boats come from Indonesia, which is used as a convenient jumping-off point for asylum seekers from other countries who want to reach Australia.

These centres are not United Nations High Commissioner for Refugees-endorsed refugee camps, and the operation of these facilities has caused controversy, such as allegations of torture and other breaches of human rights.

== Austria-Hungary ==
=== World War I (Austria-Hungary) ===
Starting in 1914, 16 camps were built in the Austrian regions of Lower Austria, Upper Austria, Salzburg and Styria. The majority of prisoners came from Russia, Italy, Serbia and Romania. Citizens deemed enemies of the state were displaced from their homes and sent to camps throughout the Austro-Hungarian Empire. In addition of Internierungslager (internment camp) for civilians of enemy states, Austria-Hungary incarcerated over one million Allied prisoners of war.

==== Austria ====
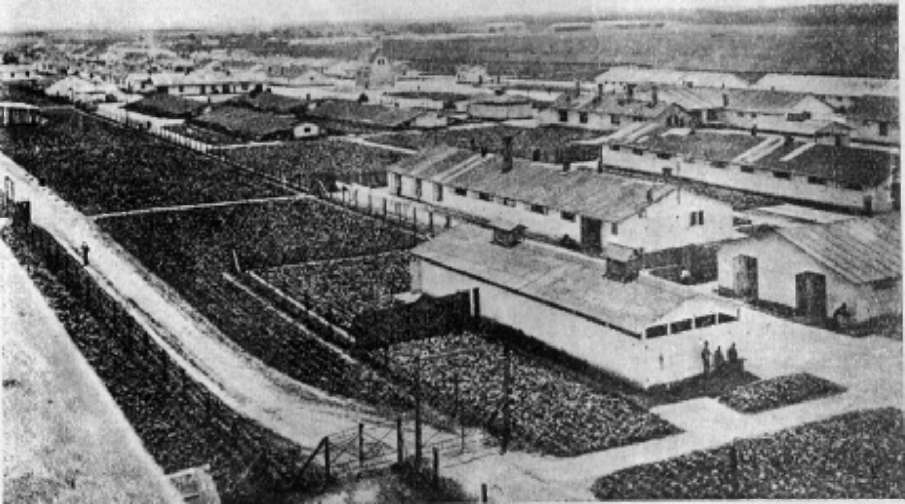
The Thalerhof internment camp in Styria, Austria.

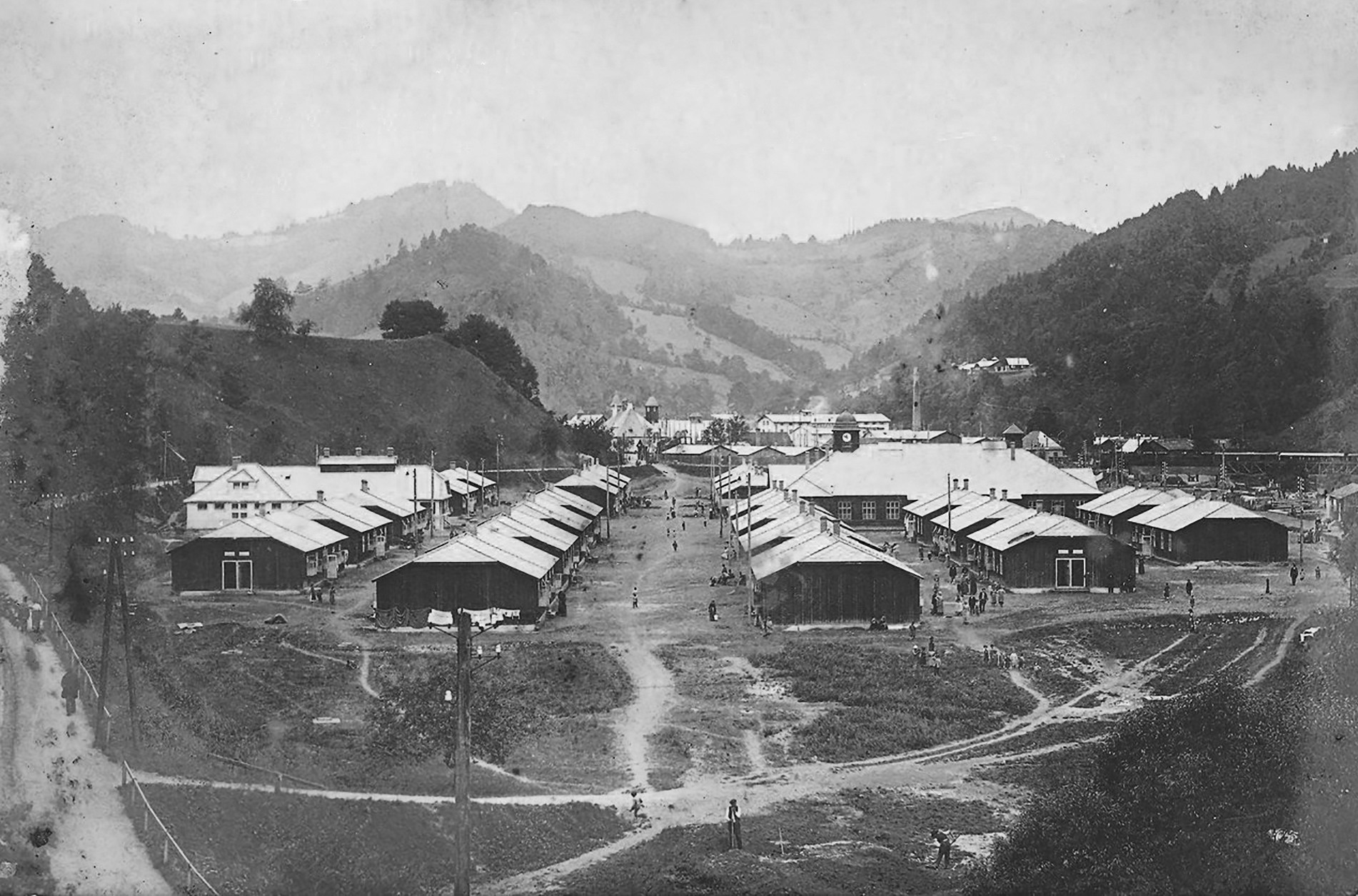
The Steinklamm Internment camp in Lower Austria.

- Braunau in Bohemia (today: Broumov in the Czech Republic), formed on 11 June 1915. Housed Serbian and Russian POWs and civilian internees, including underage Serbian children.
- Mauthausen, formed 22. September 1914. Housed Serbian and Italian POWs and Serbian civilian internees.
- Aschach an der Donau, Housed Serbian and Montenegrin POW officers and soldiers and civilian internees.
- Drosendorf internment camp
- Grossau internment camp
- Heinrichsgrün (today: Jindřichovice Czech Republic), formed beginning of June 1915, received first internees 17 June 1915. Housed Russian, Italian, Montenegrin and Serbian POWs and Montenegrin and Serbian civilian internees.
- Illmau internment camp – in the Waldviertel
- Katzenau – The largest internment camp in the territory of the monarchy, located on the right bank of the Danube near Linz, was used as an internment camp for civilians after Italy entered the war.
- Karlstein an der Thaya internment camp
- Kirchberg an der Wild internment camp – in the Zwettl district
- Markl internment camp – In Windigsteig in the Waldviertel region
- Neulengbach internment camp
- Sittmannshof internment camp – located near Loibes in Lower Austria's Waldviertel region between 1915 and 1916.
- Steinklamm internment camp – located in the municipality of Rabenstein an der Pielach in Lower Austria.
- Thalerhof internment camp – Between 1914 and 1917, around 30,000 people from Eastern Europe (mainly Ukrainians) were interned in the Thalerhof camp near Feldkirchen, south of Graz.

==== Bosnia and Herzegovina ====
- Doboj

==== Hungary ====
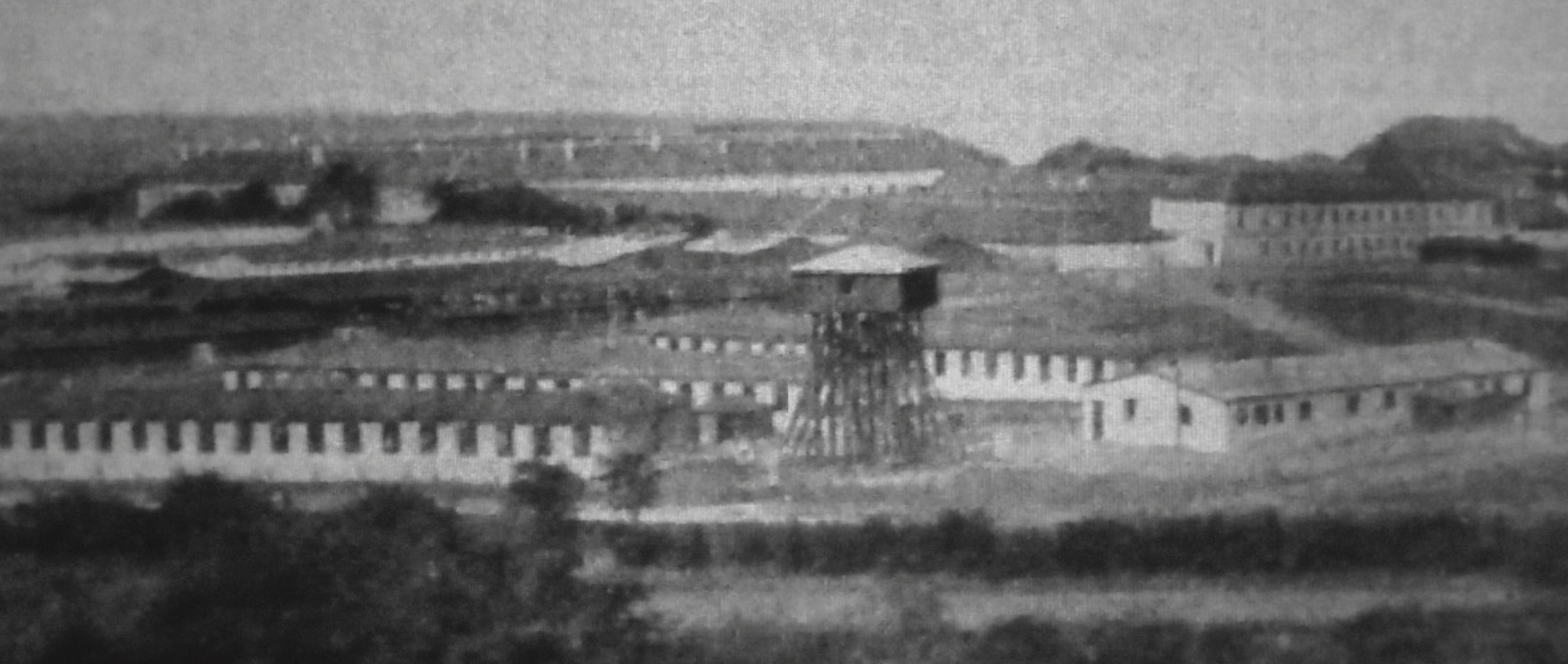
The Nezsider concentration camp in Hungary.

- Arad (today in Romania)
- Sopronnyék (today: Samersdorf, Austria), formed on 5. April 1915. Housed Serbian and Montenegrin POWs and civilian internees, including underage children.
- Boldogasszony (today: Frauerkirchen, Austria), formed in February 1915. Housed Russian, Italian, Romanian, Serbian and Montenegrin POWs and Serbian and Montenegrin civilian internees.
- Budapest
- Cegléd
- Csót
- Esztergom
- Győr
- Kecskemét
- Kenyérmező
- Nagymegyer (today Veľký Meder Slovakia)
- Nezsider - The Nezsider concentration camp in Hungary, about 17,000 internees, mostly from Serbia and Montenegro, were held throughout the war.
- Tápiósüly (today part of Sülysáp) - internment camp for civilians, including women and children, 45 km East of Budapest

== Bosnia and Herzegovina ==
=== Bosnian war ===
In a UN report, 381 out of 677 alleged camps have been corroborated and verified, involving all warring factions during the Bosnian War.

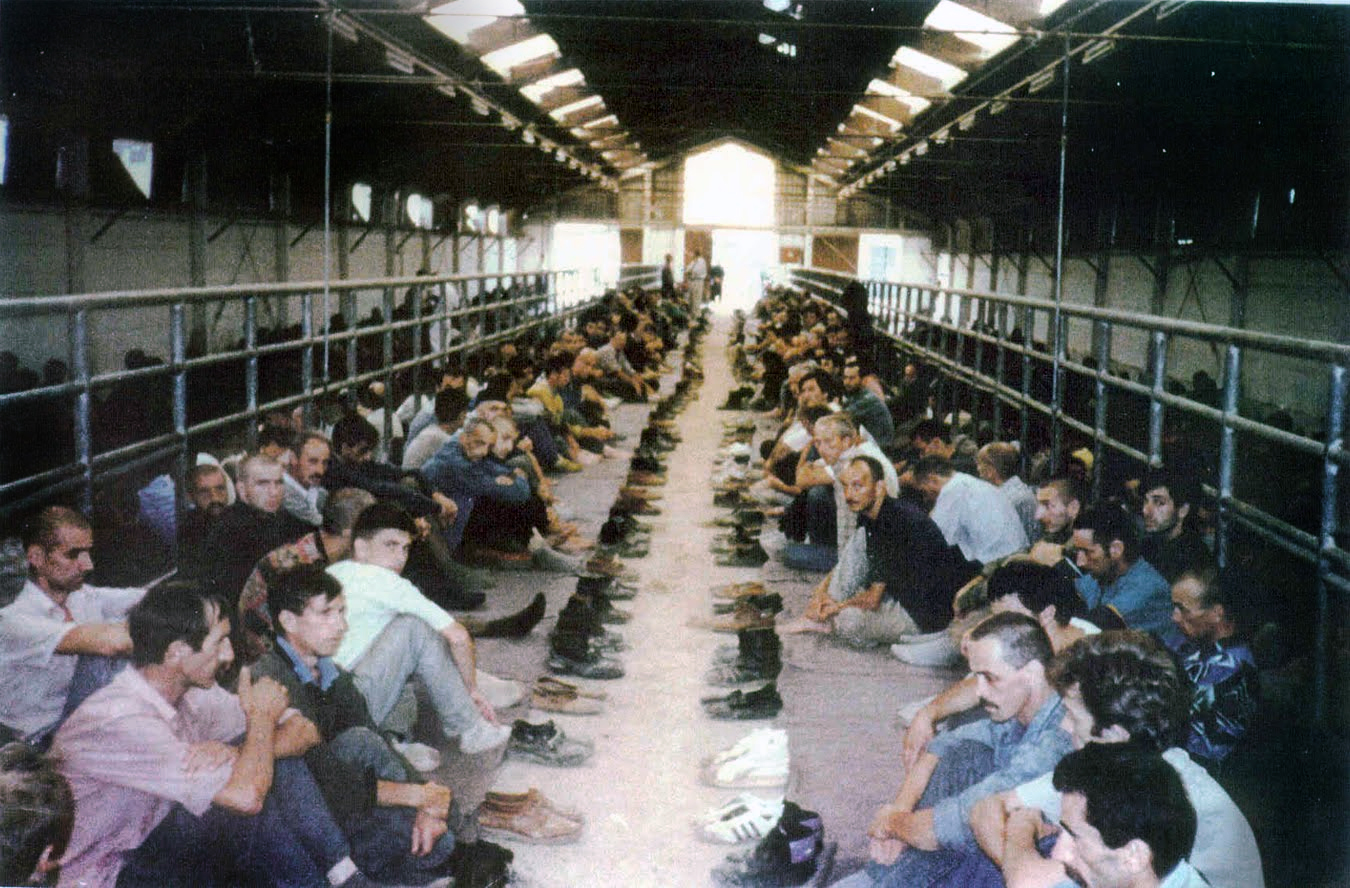
Bosniak civilian detainees of Bosanska Krajina, mainly from the Prijedor region, in Manjača camp.

Serb controlled	Croat controlled	Bosniak controlled
Buk Bijela); Omarska camp; Partizan sports hall; Luka camp; Liplje camp; Batković camp; Sušica camp; Vilina Vlas; Uzamnica camp; Trnopolje camp; Keraterm camp; Manjača camp	Dretelj camp; Heliodrom camp; Gabela camp; Vojno camp	Čelebići prison camp (Bosniak/Croat-controlled); Silos camp; Kamenica camp (El Mudžahid-controlled)

== Bulgaria ==
=== World War I (Bulgaria) ===
During World War I, Bulgaria was part of the Central Powers with Germany, Austria Hungary and Turkey. The Bulgarians established their largest prison camps in Sofia as well as smaller working camps across the kingdom but also military prison camps in Bulgarian occupied Serbia.

- Dobritch (Bazargic)
- Gorno Panicherevo - Located near Stara Zagora, holding prisoners of war and Serbian civilian internees, including women, children, a French school teacher and 84 Orthodox priests (according to Red Cross inspection of 11 May 1917)
- Haskovo - This prison camp held both Serbian prisoners of war and civilian internees, including women, children, and priests.
- Orhanie (today called Botevgrad) held both prisoners of war and civilian internees, mostly Serbian but also Russian.
- Philippopolis - The camp was established on the site of a former cholera hospital and incarcerated approximately 5,250 Serbian, British, and French with a majority of Serbian civilians.
- Rakhovo (today Slovakia)
- Sliven - Sliven held approximately 19,900 Serbian, Romanian, Russian, British, and French prisoners, including sixteen Serbian Orthodox priests.
- Sofia - The Bulgarian army maintained three prison camps around the city, holding a total of 20,000 prisoners of war and civilian internees.
  - Camp 1 - Mostly French prisoners
  - Camp 2 - Mostly Serbian prisoners
  - Camp 3 - Mostly Serbian prisoners with some Russians, Romanians and Italians

==== Bulgarian occupied Serbia ====
- Niš
- Struga (today North Macedonia) - In Bulgarian-occupied province of Monastir in southwestern Serbia.

== Cambodia ==
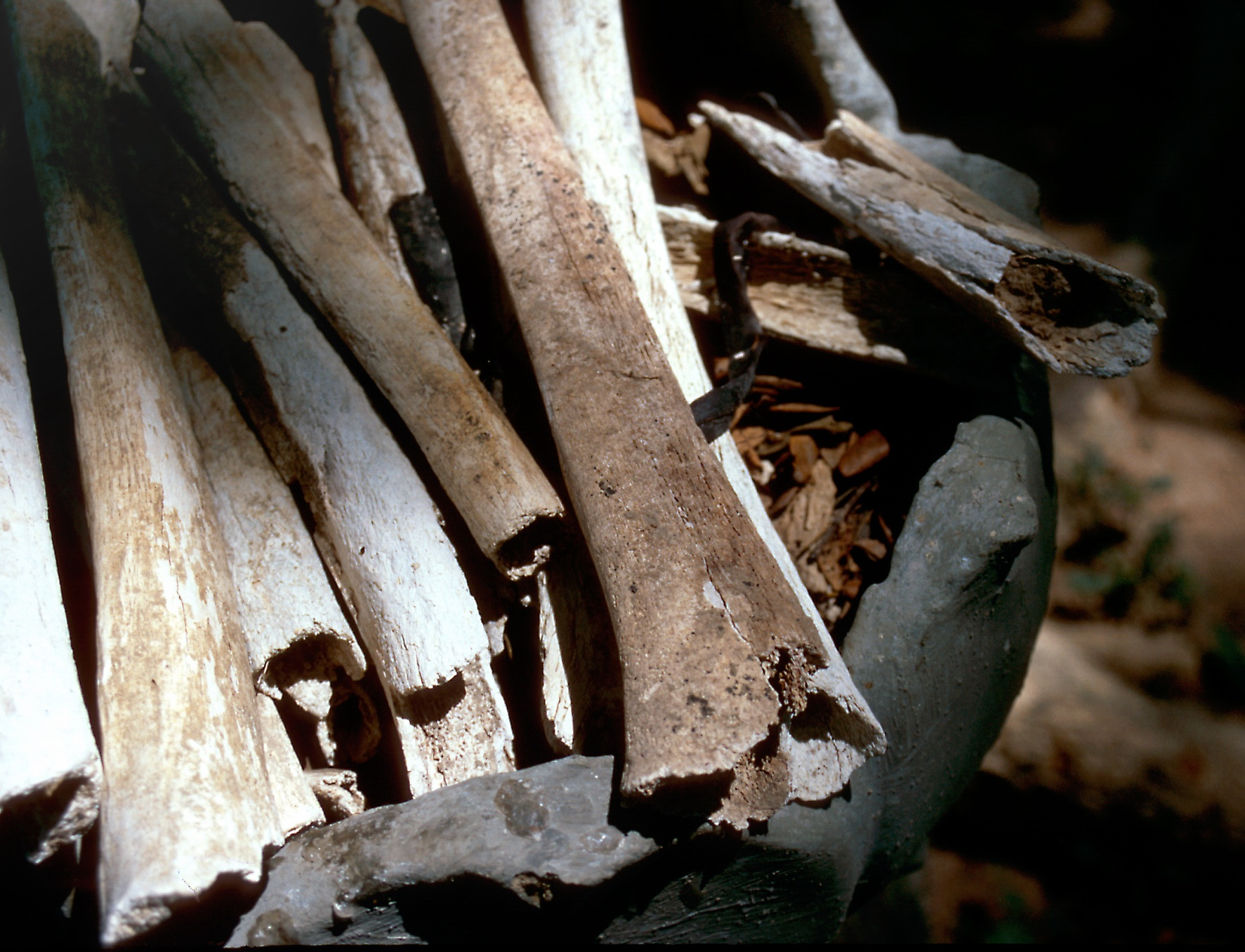
Choung Ek Killing Field: The bones of young children who were killed by Khmer Rouge.

The totalitarian communist Khmer Rouge régime established over 150 prisons for political opponents, of which Tuol Sleng is the best known. According to Ben Kiernan, "all but seven of the twenty thousand Tuol Sleng prisoners" were executed.

== Canada ==
=== World War I (Canada) ===
==== Ukrainian Canadian internment ====
In World War I, 8,579 male "aliens of enemy nationality" were interned, including 5,954 Austro-Hungarians, including ethnic Ukrainians, Croats, and Serbs. Many of these internees were used for forced labour in internment camps.

==== Camps and relocation centres elsewhere in Canada ====
There were internment camps near Kananaskis, Alberta; Petawawa, Ontario; Hull, Quebec; Minto, New Brunswick; and Amherst, Nova Scotia.

About 250 people worked as guards at the Amherst, Nova Scotia camp at Park and Hickman streets from April 1915 to September 1919. The prisoners, including Leon Trotsky, cleared land around the experimental farm and built the pool in Dickey Park.

=== World War II (Canada) ===
During the World War II, the Canadian government interned people of German, Italian and Japanese ancestry, besides citizens of other origins it deemed dangerous to national security. This included both fascists (including Canadians such as Adrien Arcand who had negotiated with Hitler to obtain positions in the government of Canada once Canada was conquered), Montreal mayor Camillien Houde (for denouncing conscription) and union organizers and other people deemed to be dangerous Communists. Such internment was made legal by the Defence of Canada Regulations, passed 3 September 1939. Section 21 of which read:

The Minister of Justice, if satisfied that, with a view to preventing any particular person from acting in a manner prejudicial to the public safety or the safety of the State, it is necessary to do so, may, notwithstanding anything in these regulations, make an order [...] directing that he be detained by virtue of an order made under this paragraph, be deemed to be in legal custody.

==== Internment of Jewish refugees ====
European refugees who had managed to escape the Nazis and made it to Britain, were rounded up as "enemy aliens" in 1940. Many were interned on the Isle of Man, and 2,300 were sent to Canada, mostly Jews. They were transported on the same boats as German and Italian POWs. They were sent to camps in New Brunswick, Ontario and Quebec provinces where they were mixed in with Canadian fascists and other political prisoners, Nazi POWs, etc.

==== German Canadian internment ====
During the Second World War, 850 German Canadians were accused of being spies for the Nazis, as well as subversives and saboteurs. The internees were given a chance by authorities to defend themselves; according to the transcripts of the appeal tribunals, internees and state officials debated conflicting concepts of citizenship.

Many German Canadians interned in Camp Petawawa were from a migration in 1876. They had arrived in a small area a year after a Polish migration landed in Wilno, Ontario. Their hamlet, made up of farmers primarily, was called Germanicus, and is in the bush less than 10 miles (16 km) from Eganville, Ontario. Their farms (homesteads originally) were expropriated by the federal government for no compensation, and the men were imprisoned behind barbed wire in the AOAT camp. (The Foymount Air Force Base near Cormac and Eganville was built on this expropriated land.) Notable was that not one of these homesteaders from 1876 or their descendants had ever visited Germany again after 1876, yet they were accused of being German Nazi agents.

756 German sailors, mostly captured in East Asia were sent from camps in India to Canada in June 1941 (Camp 33).

By 19 April 1941, 61 prisoners had made a break for liberty from Canadian internment camps. The escapees included 28 German prisoners who escaped from the internment camp east of Port Arthur, Ontario in April 1941.

==== Italian Canadian internment ====
On 10 June 1940, Italy joined the war on the Axis side. After that, Italian Canadians were heavily scrutinized. Openly fascist organizations were deemed illegal while individuals with fascist inclinations were arrested, most often without warrants. Organizations seen as openly fascist also had properties confiscated without warrants. A provision under the Canadian War Measures Act was immediately enacted by Prime Minister William Lyon Mackenzie King. Named the Defence of Canada Regulations, it allowed government authorities to take the necessary measures to protect the country from internal threats and enemies. The same afternoon that Italy joined the Axis powers, Italian consular and embassy officials were asked to leave as soon as physically possible. Canada, which was heavily involved in the war effort on the Allies' side, saw the Italian communities as a breeding ground of likely internal threats and a haven of conceivable spy networks helping the fascist Axis nations of Italy and Germany. Though many Italians were anti-fascist and no longer politically involved with their homeland, this did not stop 600–700 Italians from being sent to internment camps throughout Canada.

The first of these Italian prisoners were sent to Camp Petawawa, in the Ottawa River Valley. By October 1940 the round up had already been completed. Italian Canadian Montrealer, Mario Duliani wrote "The City Without Women" about his life in the internment camp Petawawa during World War II; it is a personal account of the struggles of the time. Throughout the country Italians were investigated by RCMP officials who had a compiled list of Italian persons who were politically involved and deeply connected in the Italian communities. Most of the arrested individuals were from the Montreal and Toronto areas; they were pronounced enemy aliens.

After the war, resentment and suspicion of the Italian communities still lingered. Laval Fortier, commissioner for overseas immigration after the war, wrote: "The Italian South Peasant is not the type we are looking for in Canada. His standard of living, his way of life, even his civilization seem so different that I doubt if he could ever become an asset to our country". Such remarks reflected a large proportion of the population who had negative views of the Italian communities. A Gallup poll released in 1946 showed 73 percent of Québécois were against immigration, with 25 percent stating Italians were the group of people most wanted kept out — even though the pre-war years had proved that Italians were an asset to the Canadian economy and industry, as they accomplished critical jobs that were seen as very unappealing, such as laying track across rural and dangerous landscapes and building infrastructure in urban areas.

==== Japanese Canadian internment and relocation centres ====
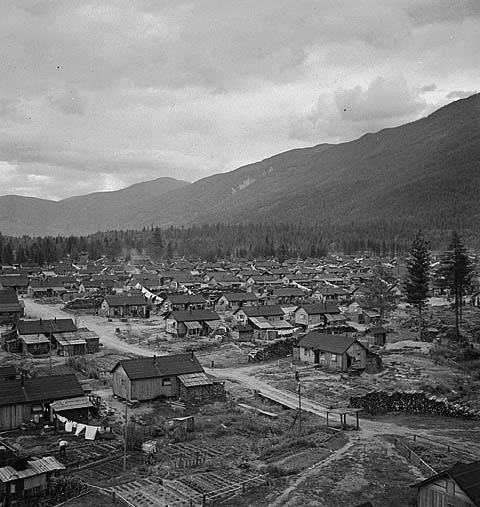
An internment camp for Japanese-Canadians in British Columbia

During World War II, Canada interned residents of Japanese ancestry. Over 75% were Canadian nationals and they were vital in key areas of the economy, notably the fishery and also logging and berry farming. Exile took two forms: relocation centres for families and relatively well-off individuals who were a low security threat, and internment camps which were for single men, the less well-off, and those deemed to be a security risk. After the war, many did not return to the Coast because of bitter feelings as to their treatment, and fears of further hostility from non-Japanese citizens; of those that returned only about 25% regained confiscated property and businesses. Most remained in other parts of Canada, notably certain parts of the British Columbia Interior and in the neighbouring province of Alberta.

===== Camps and relocation centres in the West Kootenay and Boundary regions =====
Internment camps, called "relocation centres", were at Greenwood, Kaslo, Lemon Creek, New Denver, Rosebery, Sandon, Slocan City, and Tashme. Some were nearly-empty ghost towns when the internment began, others, like Kaslo and Greenwood, while less populous than in their boom years, were substantial communities.

===== Self-supporting centres in the Lillooet-Fraser Canyon region =====
A different kind of camp, known as a self-supporting centre, was found in other regions. Bridge River, Minto City, McGillivray Falls, East Lillooet, Taylor Lake were in the Lillooet Country or nearby. Other than Taylor Lake, these were all called "Self-supporting centres", not internment camps. The first three listed were all in a mountainous area so physically isolated that fences and guards were not required as the only egress from that region was by rail or water. McGillivray Falls and Tashme, on the Crowsnest Highway east of Hope, British Columbia, were just over the minimum 100 miles from the Coast required by the deportation order, though Tashme had direct road access over that distance, unlike McGillivray. Because of the isolation of the country immediately coast-wards from McGillivray, men from that camp were hired to work at a sawmill in what has since been named Devine, after the mill's owner, which is within the 100-mile quarantine zone. Many of those in the East Lillooet camp were hired to work in town, or on farms nearby, particularly at Fountain, while those at Minto and Minto Mine and those at Bridge River worked for the railway or the hydro company.

== Channel Islands ==
Alderney in the Channel Islands was the only place in the British Isles where the Germans established concentration camps during their Occupation of the Channel Islands. In January 1942, the occupying German forces established four camps, called Helgoland, Norderney, Borkum and Sylt (named after the German North Sea islands), where captive Russians and other East Europeans were used as slave labourers to build the Atlantic Wall defences on the island. Around 460 prisoners died in the Alderney camps.

== Chile ==
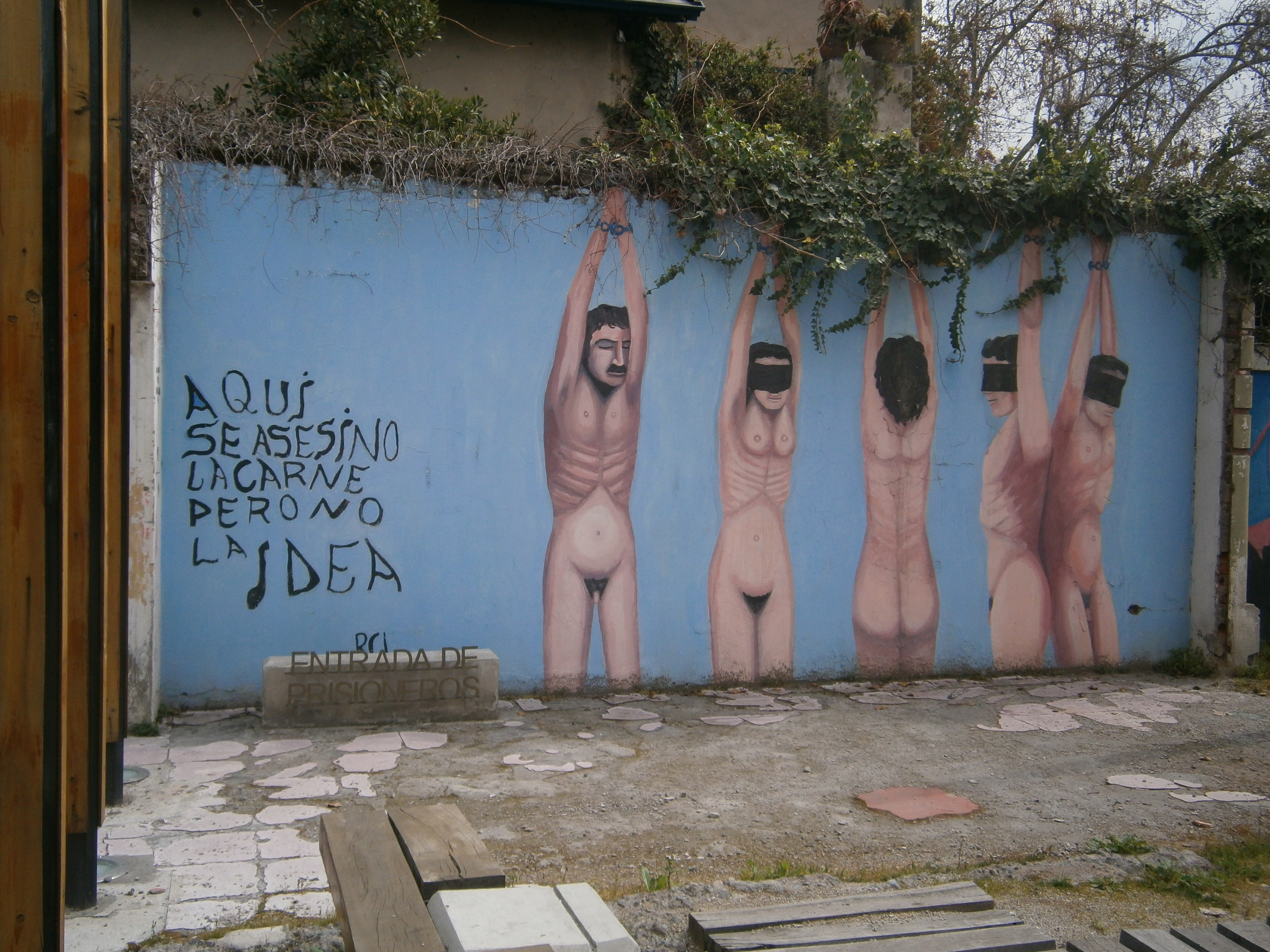
DINA's detention and torture center in Pinochet's Chile

- Concentration camps were used during the Selknam genocide.
- Concentration camps existed throughout Chile during Pinochet's dictatorship in the 1970s and 80s. An article in Harvard Review of Latin America reported that "there were over eighty detention centers in Santiago alone" and it gave details of some. Information on detention centers is included in the Report of the Chilean National Commission on Truth and Reconciliation (Rettig report).

Some of the detention centers in Chile in this period:

In Santiago, Chile	In the Atacama Desert	Near Tierra Del Fuego	Other Areas
Estadio Nacional de Chile (National Stadium)	Chacabuco	Dawson Island	Puchuncaví
Estadio Chile (now Víctor Jara Stadium)	Pisagua Prison Camp		Ritoque
Villa Grimaldi			Esmeralda (training ship)
Tres Álamos			Tejas Verdes
Venda Sexy (aka "La Discothèque")			
Casa de José Domingo Cañas			
Londres 38			
Cuartel Simón Bolívar			

== China ==
=== Laogai ===
Laogai (Chinese: 劳改; pinyin: Láogǎi), the abbreviation for Láodòng Gǎizào (劳动改造), which means reform through labor, is a criminal justice system involving the use of penal labour and prison farms in the People's Republic of China (PRC). Láogǎi is different from láojiào, or re-education through labor, which was the abolished administrative detention system for people who were not criminals but had committed minor offenses, and was intended to "reform offenders into law-abiding citizens". Persons who were detained in the laojiao were detained in facilities that were separate from those which comprised the general prison system of the laogai. Both systems, however, were based on penal labour. The system has been estimated to have caused tens of millions of deaths and it has also been likened to slavery by its critics. The memoirs of Harry Wu describe his experience in reform-through-labor prisons from 1960 to 1979. Wu recounts his imprisonment for criticizing the government while he was in college and his release in 1979, after which he moved to the United States and eventually became an activist. Officials of the Chinese Communist Party have argued that Wu far overstates the present role of Chinese labor camps and ignores the tremendous changes that have occurred in China since the 1970s.

There are also accusations that Chinese labor-camps produce goods which are often sold in foreign countries with the profits going to the PRC government. The products include everything from green tea to industrial engines to coal dug from mines.

=== Falun Gong ===
There have been reports of Falun Gong practitioners being detained at the Sujiatun Thrombosis Hospital, or at the "Sujiatun Concentration Camp". It has been alleged that Falun Gong practitioners are killed for their organs, which are then sold to medical facilities. The Chinese government rejects these allegations. The US State Department visited the alleged camp on two occasions, first unannounced, and found the allegations not credible. Chinese dissident and executive director of the Laogai Research Foundation, Harry Wu, having sent his own investigators to the site, was unable to substantiate these claims, and he believed the reports were fabricated.

=== Xinjiang ===
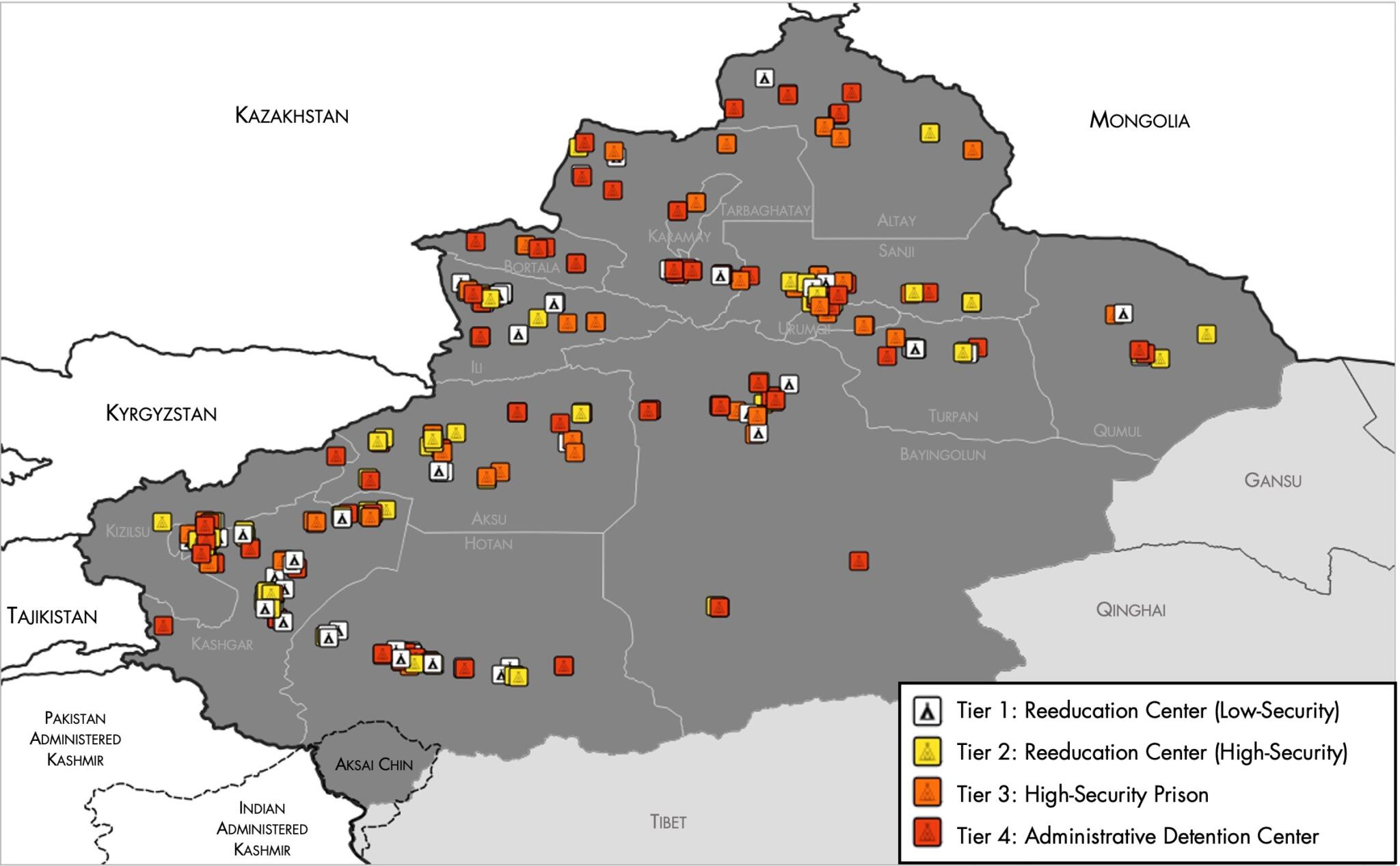
Map of the Xinjiang re-education camps based on data collected by the US National Geospatial Intelligence Agency and the Australian Strategic Policy Institute

As of 2018 at least 120,000 members of China's Muslim Uyghur minority were held in mass-detention camps, termed by Chinese authorities "vocational education and training centers", which aim to change the political thinking of detainees, their identities and religious beliefs. According to Amnesty International and Human Rights Watch, as many as 1 million people have been detained in these camps, which are located in the Xinjiang region. International reports state that as many as 3 million Uyghurs and other Muslim minorities may have been detained China's re-education camps in the Xinjiang region.

According to researcher Adrian Zenz, mass internments peaked in 2018 and have wound down since then, with officials shifting focus towards forced labor programs. In 2019, the Chinese government claimed the centers have been closed. Individuals in the camps have been shifted into the formal penal system, with remaining camps being converted into prisons or factories using forced labor.

== Croatia ==
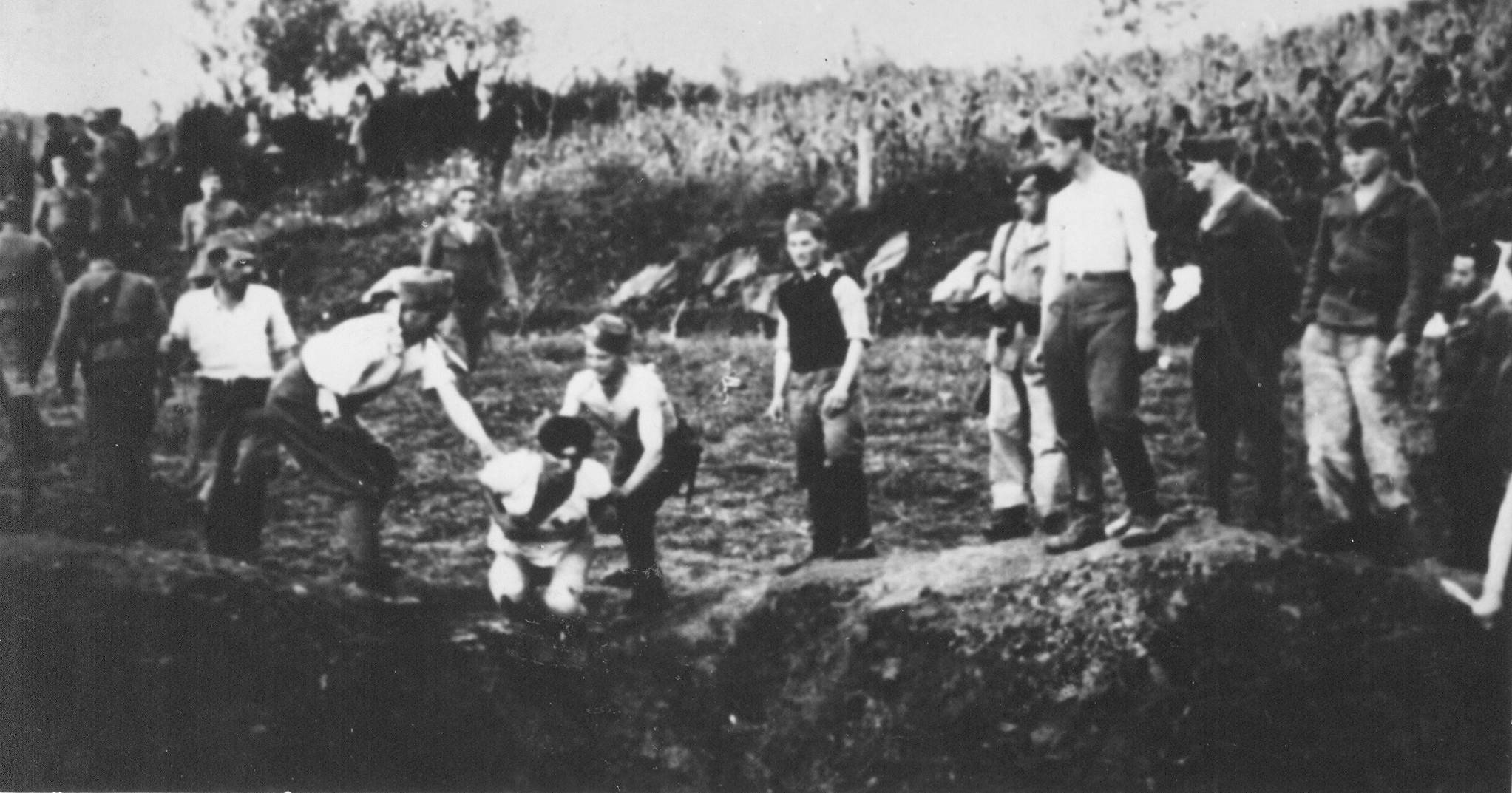
Ustaše militia executing people over a mass grave near Jasenovac concentration camp

=== World War II (Croatia) ===
An estimated 200,000–500,000 Serbs, 30,000 Croatian Jews and 30,000 Roma were killed during the Independent State of Croatia, including between 77,000 and 99,000 Serbs, Bosniaks, Croats, Jews and Roma killed in the Jasenovac concentration camp.

=== Yugoslav wars ===
- Kerestinec prison
- Lora prison camp, Split
- Ovčara camp

== Cuba ==
=== Cuban War of Independence ===
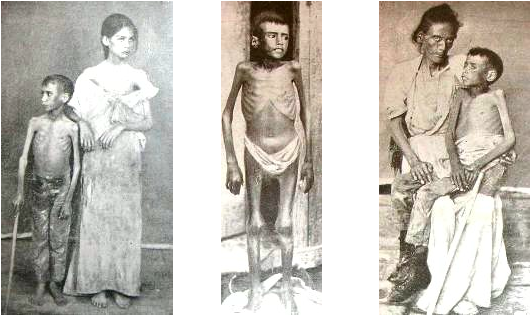
Cuban victims of Spanish reconcentration policies, 1896

After Marshal Campos had failed to pacify the Cuban rebellion, the Conservative government of Antonio Cánovas del Castillo sent out Valeriano Weyler. This selection met the approval of most Spaniards, who thought him the proper man to crush the rebellion. While serving as a Spanish general, he was called "Butcher Weyler" because hundreds of thousands of people died in his concentration camps.

He was made governor of Cuba with full powers to suppress the insurgency (rebellion was widespread in Cuba) and restore the island to political order and its sugar production to greater profitability. Initially, Weyler was greatly frustrated by the same factors that had made victory difficult for all generals of traditional standing armies fighting against an insurgency. While the Spanish troops marched in regulation and required substantial supplies, their opponents practiced hit-and-run tactics and lived off the land, blending in with the non-combatant population. He came to the same conclusions as his predecessors as well—that to win Cuba back for Spain, he would have to separate the rebels from the civilians by putting the latter in safe havens, protected by loyal Spanish troops. By the end of 1897, General Weyler had relocated more than 300,000 into such "reconcentration camps." Weyler learned this tactic from the American Civil War campaign of General Sherman while assigned to the post of military attaché in the Spanish Embassy in Washington D.C..{Citation needed} However, many mistakenly believe him to be to the origin of such tactics after it was later used by the British in the Second Boer War and later evolved into a designation to describe the concentration camps of the 20th century regimes of Hitler and Stalin. Although he was successful moving vast numbers of people, he failed to provide for them adequately. Consequently, these areas became cesspools of hunger and disease, where many hundreds of thousands died.

Weyler's "reconcentration" policy had another important effect. Although it made Weyler's military objectives easier to accomplish, it had devastating political consequences. Although the Spanish Conservative government supported Weyler's tactics wholeheartedly, the Liberals denounced them vigorously for their toll on the Cuban civilian population. In the propaganda war waged in the United States, Cuban émigrés made much of Weyler's inhumanity to their countrymen and won the sympathy of broad groups of the U.S. population to their cause. He was nicknamed "the Butcher" Weyler by journalists like William Randolph Hearst.

Weyler's strategy also backfired militarily due to the rebellion in the Philippines that required the redeployment by 1897 of some troops already in Cuba. When Prime Minister Antonio Cánovas del Castillo was assassinated in June, Weyler lost his principal supporter in Spain. He resigned his post in late 1897 and returned to Europe. He was replaced in Cuba by the more conciliatory Ramón Blanco y Erenas.

=== Rule of Fidel Castro ===
Military Units to Aid Production were forced labor concentration camps which were established by Fidel Castro's communist government, from November 1965 to July 1968.

They were used to brainwash the Cuban population and force it to renounce alleged "bourgeois" and "counter-revolutionary" values. First, people were thrown into overcrowded prison cells which were located in police stations and later they were taken to secret police facilities, cinemas, stadiums, warehouses, and similar locations. They were photographed, fingerprinted and forced to sign confessions which declared that they were the "scum of society" in exchange for their temporary release until they were summoned to the concentration camps. Those who refused to sign the confessions were physically and psychologically tortured.

Beginning in November 1965, people who were already classified as the "scum of society" started to arrive in the concentration camps by train, bus, truck and other police and military vehicles.

"Social deviants" such as homosexuals, vagrants, Jehovah's Witnesses and other religious missionaries were imprisoned in these concentration camps, where they would be "reeducated".

== Czechoslovakia ==
Penal work camps for the Czechoslovak Uranium Mines There was a large set of prisoner work camps modeled on the form of the GULAG after 1945, and officially from 1949 to 1961, which provided (for seriously reduced price) most of the uranium required for the Soviet atomic bomb project. Roughly 65,000 prisoners went through these camps, roughly half of them being political prisoners. Average life expectancy in the camps sunk to around 45 years, and in some plants (like The Red Tower of Death) most of the workers later died from radiation sickness.

== Denmark ==
=== Before and during World War II ===
- Horserød camp – established during World War I as a camp for war prisoners in need of treatment, it was used during World War II as an internment camp. It is now an open prison.
- Frøslev Prison Camp – established during World War II as an internment camp by the Danish government in order to avoid deportation of Danish citizens to Germany. Used after the war to house Nazi collaborators and later students of a continuation high school located inside the camp.

=== After World War II ===
Denmark received about 240,000 refugees from Germany and other countries after the war. They were put into camps guarded by the reestablished army. Contact between Danes and the refugees were very limited and strictly enforced. About 17,000 died in the camps due to injuries and illness resulting from their escape from Germany or poor camp conditions. Known camps were

- Dragsbæklejren – a base for seaplanes, later converted into an internment camp for refugees. It is now used by the army
- Gedhus – located on an area which now is home to Karup Airport
- Grove – located on an area which now is home to Karup Airport
- Rye Flyveplads – a small airfield in Jutland
- Kløvermarken – is now a park in Copenhagen
- Oksbøl Refugee Camp – now belongs to the Danish Army
- Skallerup Klit – was developed into an area for summer houses

== Finland ==
=== Finnish Civil War ===
In the Finnish Civil War, the victorious White Army and German troops captured about 80,000 Red prisoners by the end of the war on 5 May 1918. Once the White terror subsided, a few thousand including mainly small children and women, were set free, leaving 74,000–76,000 prisoners. The largest prison camps were Suomenlinna (an archipelago just offshore from the center of Helsinki), Hämeenlinna, Lahti, Viipuri, Ekenäs, Riihimäki and Tampere. The Senate made the decision to keep these prisoners detained until each person's guilt could be examined. A law for a Tribunal of Treason was enacted on 29 May after a long dispute between the White army and the Senate of the proper trial method to adopt. The start of the heavy and slow process of trials was delayed further until 18 June 1918. The Tribunal did not meet all the standards of neutral justice, due to the mental atmosphere of White Finland after the war. Approximately 70,000 Reds were convicted, mainly for complicity to treason. Most of the sentences were lenient, however, and many got out on parole. 555 persons were sentenced to death, of whom 113 were executed. The trials revealed also that some innocent persons had been imprisoned.

Combined with the severe food shortage, the mass imprisonment led to high mortality rates in the camps, and the catastrophe was compounded by a mentality of punishment, anger and indifference on the part of the victors. Many prisoners felt that they were abandoned also by their own leaders, who had fled to Russia. The condition of the prisoners had weakened rapidly during May, after food supplies had been disrupted during the Red Guards' retreat in April, and a high number of prisoners had been captured already during the first half of April in Tampere and Helsinki. As a consequence, 2,900 starved to death or died in June as a result of diseases caused by malnutrition and Spanish flu, 5,000 in July, 2,200 in August, and 1,000 in September. The mortality rate was highest in the Ekenäs camp at 34%, while in the others the rate varied between 5% and 20%. In total, between 11,000 and 13,500 Finns perished. The dead were buried in mass graves near the camps. The majority of the prisoners were paroled or pardoned by the end of 1918 after the victory of the Western powers in World War I also caused a major change in the Finnish domestic political situation. There were 6,100 Red prisoners left at the end of the year, 100 in 1921 (at the same time civil rights were given back to 40,000 prisoners) and in 1927 the last 50 prisoners were pardoned by the social democratic government led by Väinö Tanner. In 1973, the Finnish government paid reparations to 11,600 persons imprisoned in the camps after the civil war.

=== World War II (Continuation War) ===
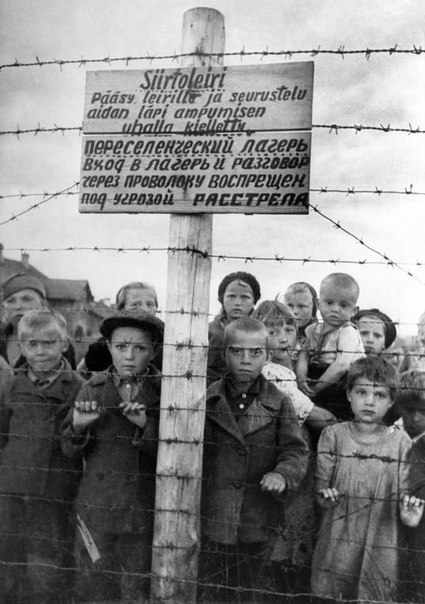
Russian children at a Finnish-run transfer camp in Petrozavodsk. The sign reads, in Finnish and Russian: "Transfer camp. Entry to the camp and conversations through the fence are forbidden under the penalty of death."

When the Finnish Army during the Second World War occupied East Karelia from 1941–1944, which was inhabited by ethnically related Finnic Karelians (although it never had been a part of Finland—or before 1809 of Swedish Finland), several concentration camps were set up for ethnically Russian civilians. The first camp was set up on 24 October 1941, in Petrozavodsk. The two largest groups were 6,000 Russian refugees and 3,000 inhabitants from the southern bank of River Svir forcibly evacuated because of the closeness of the front line. Around 4,000 of the prisoners perished due to malnourishment, 90% of them during the spring and summer 1942. The ultimate goal was to move the Russian speaking population to German-occupied Russia in exchange for any Finnish population from these areas, and also help to watch civilians.

Population in the Finnish camps:

- 13,400 – 31 December 1941
- 21,984 – 1 July 1942
- 15,241 – 1 January 1943
- 14,917 – 1 January 1944

== France ==
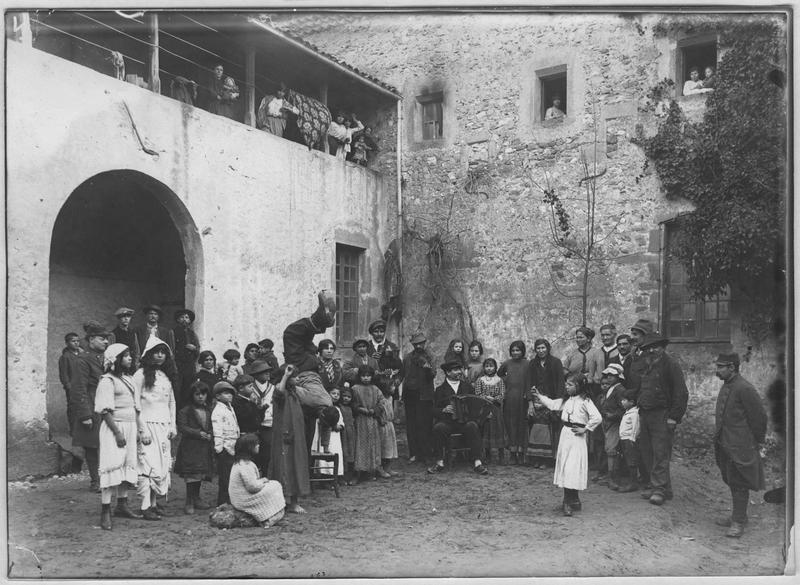
Crest concentration camp, one of the French concentration camps for Gypsies, 1916

=== Devil's Island ===
The Devil's Island was a network of prisons in French Guiana that ran from 1852 to 1953 used to intern petty criminals and political prisoners in which up to 75% of the 80,000 interned perished.

=== Algeria ===
During the French conquest of Algeria, which began in 1830 and was fully completed by 1903, the French used the camps to hold Arabs, Berbers and Turks they had forcibly removed from fertile areas of land, in order to replace them by primarily French, Spanish, and Maltese settlers. The conquest led to the deaths of between 500,000 and 1 million of an estimated 3 million Algerians from famine, disease, and war. Historian Ben Kiernan wrote on the conquest of Algeria: "By 1875, the French conquest was complete. The war killed approximately 825,000 indigenous Algerians since 1830,"

During the Algerian War of Independence (1954–1962), the French military created centres de regroupements (regrouping centres), which were built settlements for forcibly displaced civilian populations, in order to separate them from National Liberation Front (FLN) guerilla combatants. According to civil servant Michel Rocard, 1,000,000 Algerians were sent to regrouping camps (including children).

In 1959, Michel Rocard denounced the appalling conditions of many of those camps in a report, leaked and published in Le Monde. As a consequence the camps were modernized and became part of a large rural renovation program called Les Milles Villages (One Thousand Villages).

=== Spanish Republicans ===
After the end of Spanish Civil War, there were harsh reprisals against Franco's former enemies. Hundreds of thousands of Republicans fled abroad, especially to France and Mexico. On the other side of the Pyrenees, refugees were confined in internment camps of the French Third Republic, such as the Rieucros Camp, Camp de Rivesaltes, Camp Gurs or Camp Vernet, where 12,000 Republicans were housed in squalid conditions (mostly soldiers from the Durruti Column). The 17,000 refugees housed in Gurs were divided into four categories (Brigadists, pilots, Gudaris and ordinary Spaniards). The Gudaris (Basques) and the pilots easily found local backers and jobs, and were allowed to quit the camp, but the farmers and ordinary people, who could not find relations in France, were encouraged by the Third Republic, in agreement with the Francoist government, to return to Spain. The great majority did so and were turned over to the Francoist authorities in Irún. From there they were transferred to the Miranda de Ebro camp for "purification".

After the proclamation by Marshal Philippe Pétain of the Vichy regime, the refugees became political prisoners, and the French police attempted to round-up those who had been liberated from the camp. Along with other "undesirables", they were sent to the Drancy internment camp before being deported to Nazi Germany. About 5,000 Spaniards thus died in Mauthausen concentration camp

=== Vichy France ===
During World War II, The French Vichy government ran what were called "detention camps" such as the one at Drancy. Camps also existed in the Pyrenees on the border with pro-Nazi Spain, among them Camp de Rivesaltes, Camp du Récébédou, Camp Gurs and Camp Vernet. From these, the French cooperated in deporting about 73,000 Jews to Nazi Germany.

In addition, in areas which Germany formally annexed from France, such as Alsace-Lorraine, concentration camps were built, the largest being Natzweiler-Struthof.

The Vichy French also ran camps in North and West Africa, and possibly French Somaliland and Madagascar. The following are the locations of concentration camps, POW camps, and internment camps in (Vichy) West and (Vichy) North Africa:

The camps were located at:

West Africa:

- Conakry
- Timbuctoo
- Kankan
- Koulikoro, Mali
- Dakar

North Africa:

- Sfax
- El Kef
- Laghouat
- Geryville.

Also camps connected to the Laconia incident:

- Mediouna (near Casablanca)
- Qued-Zen, Morocco (near Casablanca)
- Sidi-el-Avachi, Morocco (near Azemmour)

The following camps which are under investigation:

- Taza
- Fes
- Oujda
- Sidi-bel-Abbes
- Berguent
- Settat
- Sidi-el-Ayachi
- Qued Zem
- Mecheria

The camps at Conakry, Timbuctoo, and Kankan had no running water, no electricity, no gas, no electric light, no sewers, no toilets and no baths. The prisoners (mainly British and Norwegian) were housed in native accommodation—mud huts and houses, and a tractor shed. The Vichy French authorities in West Africa called these camps "concentration camps".

== Germany ==
=== German South West Africa, 1904–1908 ===
Between 1904 and 1908, following the German suppression of the Herero and Nama in the Herero and Namaqua genocide, survivors were interned at the following locations in German South-West Africa (now Namibia):

- Shark Island Concentration Camp
- Windhoek Concentration Camp
- Okahandja Concentration Camp
- Karibib
- Swakopmund Concentration Camp
- Omaruru

=== World War I (Germany) ===
In World War I male (and some female) civilian nationals of the Allies caught by the outbreak of war on the territory of the Germany were interned. The camps (Internierungslager) included those at:

- Ruhleben, for up to 4,500 internees, on a horse race-track near Berlin.
- Holzminden in Lower Saxony, for up to 10,000 internees.
- Havelberg, in Saxony-Anhalt, for 4,500 internees, including nearly 400 British Indians.
- Celle Castle in Lower Saxony.
- Rastatt Camp, for French civilians.

=== Nazi era ===
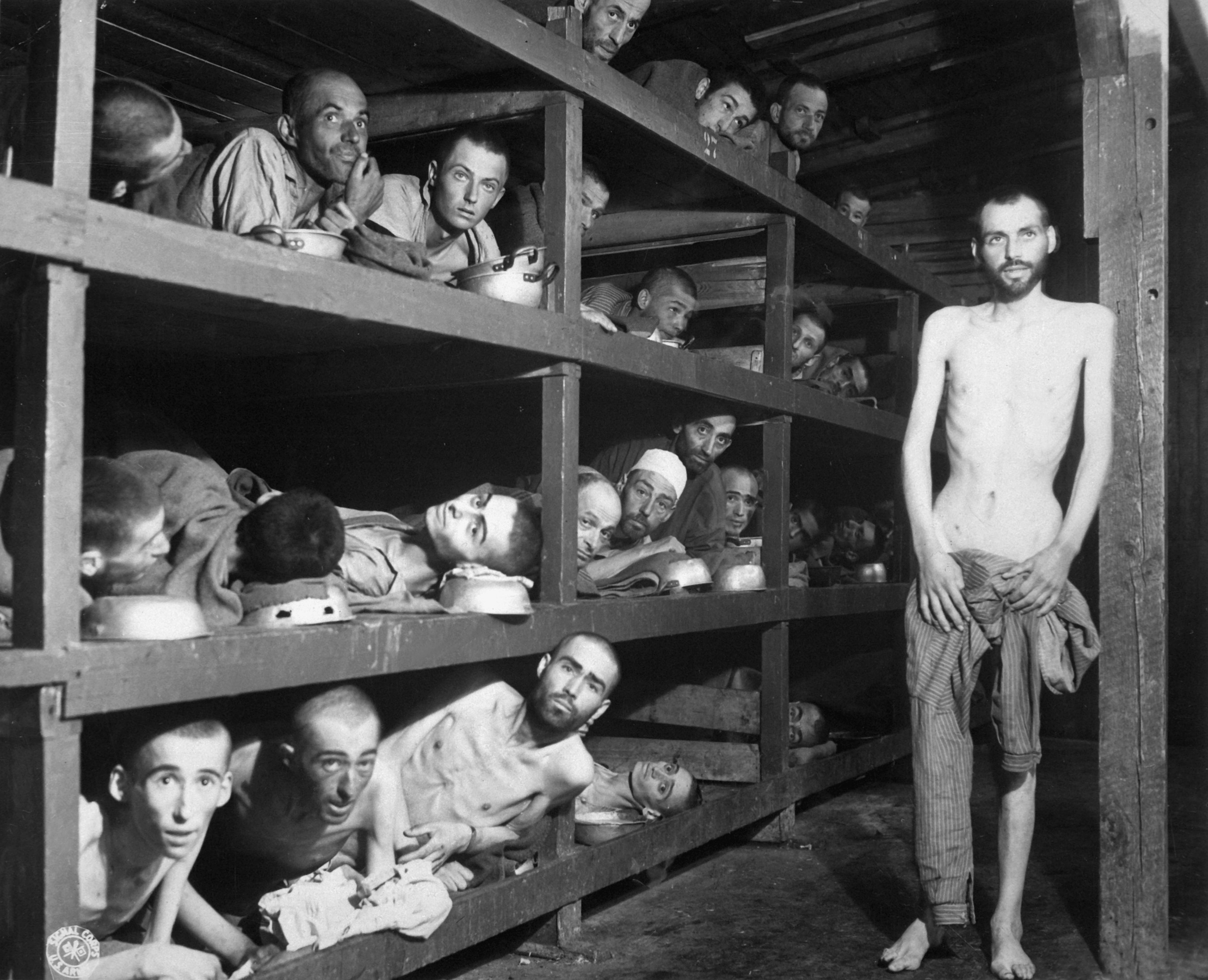
Buchenwald concentration camp, Weimar, Nazi Germany

On 30 January 1933 Adolf Hitler was appointed Chancellor of the Weimar Republic's weak coalition government. Although the Nazi party (NSDAP) was in a minority, Hitler and his associates quickly took control of the country. Within days the first concentration camp (Konzentrationslager), at Dachau, Nazi Germany, was built to hold persons considered dangerous by the Nazi administration—these included suspected communists, labor union activists, liberal politicians and even pastors. This camp became the model for all later Nazi concentration camps. It was quickly followed by Oranienburg-Sachsenhausen which became a facility for the training of SS-Death's Head officers in the operation of concentration camps.

Theodor Eicke, commandant of the Dachau camp, was appointed Inspector of Concentration Camps by Heinrich Himmler on 4 July 1934. By 1934 there were eight major institutions. This started the second phase of development. All smaller detention camps were consolidated into six major camps: Dachau, Sachsenhausen, Buchenwald, Flossenburg, and after the annexation of Austria in 1938, Mauthausen; finally in 1939 Ravensbrück (for women). The pajama type blue-striped uniforms were introduced for inmates as well as the practice of tattooing the prisoner's number on his fore-arm. Eicke started the practice of farming out prisoners as slave-labor in German industry, with sub-camps or Arbeitskommandos to house them. The use of common criminals as Kapo, to brutalize and assist in the handling of prisoners, was instituted at this time. In November 1938 the massive arrests of German Jews started, with most of them being immediately sent to the concentration camps, where they were separated from other prisoners and subjected to even harsher treatment.

The third phase started after the occupation of Poland in 1939. In the first few months Polish intellectuals were detained, including nearly the entire staff of Cracow University arrested in November 1939. Auschwitz-I and Stutthof concentration camp were built to house them and other political prisoners. Large numbers were executed or died from the brutal treatment and disease. After the occupation of Belgium, France and Netherlands in 1940, Natzweiler-Struthof, Gross Rosen and Fort Breendonk, in addition to a number of smaller camps, were set up to house intellectuals and political prisoners from those countries who had not already been executed. Many of these intellectuals were held first in Gestapo prisons, and those who were not executed immediately after interrogation were sent on to the concentration camps.

Initially, Jews in the occupied countries were interned either in other KZ, but predominantly in Ghettos that were walled off parts of cities. All the Jews in western Poland (annexed into the Reich) were transported to ghettos in the General Government. Jews were used for labour in industries, but usually transported to work then returned to the KZ or the ghetto at night. Although these ghettoes were not intended to be extermination camps, and there was no official policy to kill people, thousands died due to hunger, disease and extreme conditions. Following the Nazi advance into the Soviet Union in 1941 and 1942, camps were set up in Ukraine, Latvia, Lithuania, and Estonia, which consisted of Janowska concentration camp, Salaspils camp, Ninth Fort and Vaivara concentration camp. During this period, Jewish soldiers and civilians were systematically executed by the Einsatzgruppen of the S.S. that followed the front-line troops. At the Wannsee Conference on 20 January 1942 the "Final Solution" was decreed to exterminate all of the remaining Jews in Europe, Heydrich stated that there were still 11 million to be eliminated. To accomplish this special Vernichtungslager (extermination camps) were organized. The first was Chełmno in which 152,000, mainly from the Łódź ghetto, were killed. The method for carrying out mass murder was tested and perfected here. During 1942 and 1943 further camps Auschwitz-Birkenau II, part of Majdanek, Treblinka, Bełżec and Sobibor were built for this purpose. Jews from other concentration camps, and from the ghettos, were transported to them from all over occupied Europe. In these six camps alone, an estimated 3.1 million Jews were killed in gas chambers and the bodies burned in massive crematoria. The Nazis realized that this was a criminal act and the action was shrouded in secrecy. The extermination camps were destroyed in 1944 and early 1945 and buried. However the Soviet armies overran Auschwitz and Majdanek before the evidence could be totally destroyed.

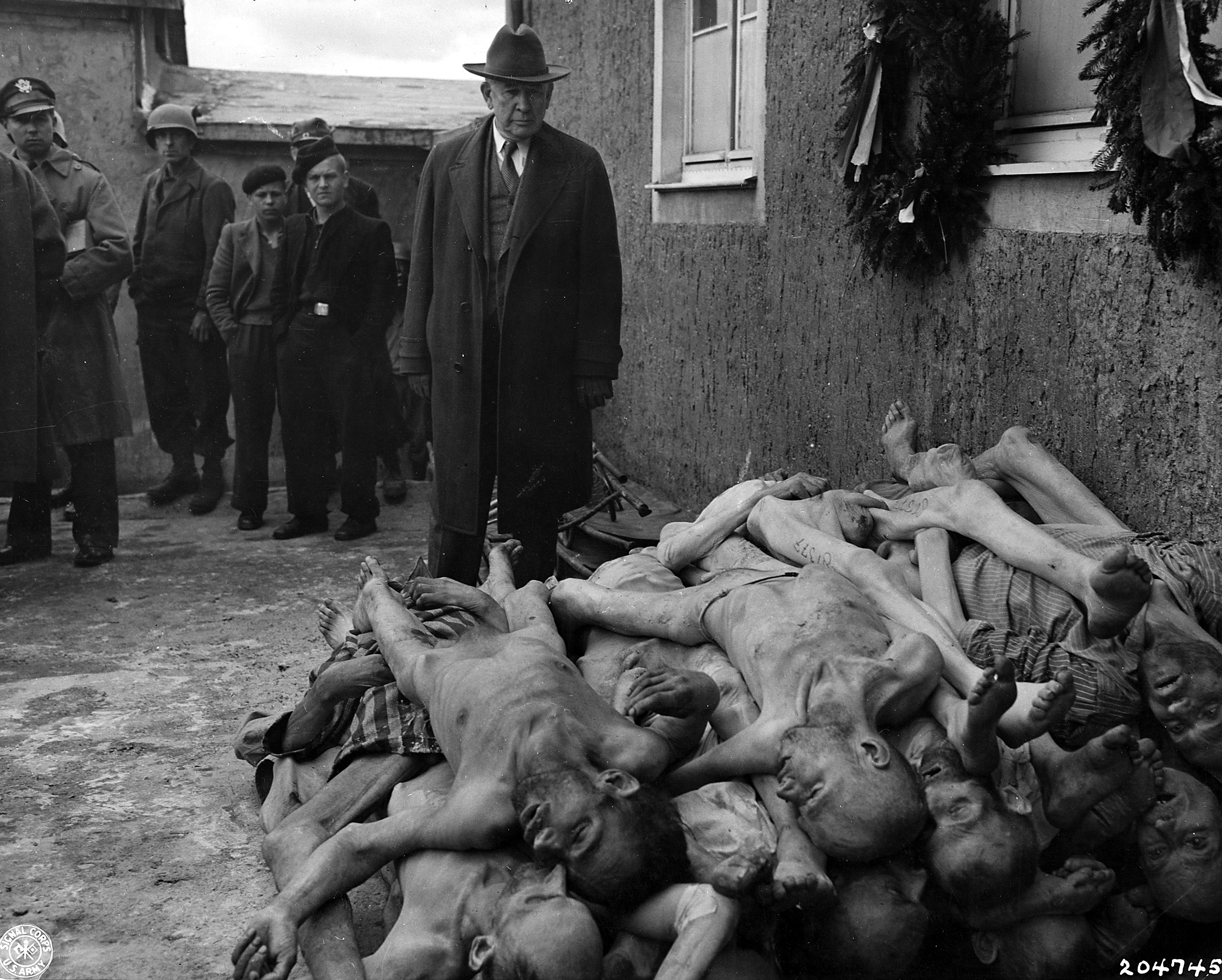
U.S. Senator Alben W. Barkley views the bodies of prisoners at a liberated Buchenwald concentration camp in April 1945

From 1935, Zigeunerlager (Gypsy camps) were constructed throughout Germany and later in occupied regions to intern Romani and Sinti people. These were municipal camps, guarded by local police and rarely SS. The first was Cologne Gypsy Camp (Schwarz-Weiß-Platz), which opened in May 1935. In occupied Czechoslovakia, the Lety concentration camp was converted from a general forced labor camp in 1942 to a Zigeunerlager holding Romani people from Bohemia and Moravia until thy were deported to their deaths at Auschwitz in late 1943.

Another category of internment camp in Nazi Germany was the labor camp (Arbeitslager). They housed civilians from the occupied countries that were being used to work in industry, on the farms, in quarries, in mines and on the railroads. Approximately 12,000,000 forced laborers, most of whom were Eastern Europeans, were enslaved in the German war economy inside the Nazi Germany. The workers were mostly young and taken from the occupied countries, predominantly eastern Europe, but also many French and Italian. They were sometimes taken willingly, more frequently as a result of lapanka in Polish, or rafle in French language, in which people were collected on the street or in their home by police drives. However, for often very minor infractions of the rules, workers were imprisoned in special Arbeitserziehungslager, German for worker re-education camp (abbreviated to AEL and sometimes referred to as Straflager). These punishment camps were operated by the Gestapo and many of the inmates were executed or died from the brutal treatment.

Finally there was one category of internment camp, called Ilag in which Allied (mainly British and American) civilians were held. These civilians had been caught behind front lines by the rapid advance of the German armies, or the sudden entry of the United States into the war. In these camps the Germans abided by the rules of the Third Geneva Convention. Deaths resulted from sickness or simply old age.

After World War II, internment camps were used by the Allied occupying forces to hold suspected Nazis, usually using the facilities of previous Nazi camps. They were all closed down by 1949. In East Germany the communist government used prison camps to hold political prisoners, opponents of the communist regime or suspected Nazi collaborators.

== Hong Kong ==
=== World War II (Japanese) ===
During the Second World War the Japanese, during their occupation of Hong Kong, interned enemy nationals (mostly British, Canadian, American and Dutch), in several internment camps in Hong Kong. Camps existed at:

- Sham Shui Po – A concentration camp was maintained here for most of the duration of the Second World War.
- Stanley Internment Camp – Located primarily on the grounds of St. Stephen's College. Shortly after surrendering, the Imperial Japanese Army broke into the St. Stephen's (which had served as a military hospital during the battle) and murdered the wounded soldiers of the Allied forces. The Japanese later merged the college with part of Stanley Prison to form the full Stanley Internment Camp.
- Stanley Prison – Located primarily in the Officer's housing blocks at the prison. During the Japanese occupation, the grounds of the prison were used as part of Stanley Internment Camp. Nearly 600 prisoners of war and civilians, killed by the Japanese during the occupation, are buried in the nearby Stanley War Cemetery (which is NOT part of the prison itself but adjacent to it).

== India ==
During both World Wars the British interned enemy nationals (mostly Germans). In 1939 this also included refugees from the Nazis as well as Germans who had acquired British citizenship, in India. Camps existed at:

=== World War I (India) ===
- Ahmednagar, also for internees from German East Africa; Sections A abysmally overcrowded with more than 1000 inmates in "medically condemned" old barracks and B for privileged (read: monied) prisoners and officers. In 1915 a parole camp was set up.
- Diyatalawa (Ceylon)
- Belgaum for women; set up late 1915; March 1917: 214 inmates
- Kataphar for families

=== World War II (India) ===
- Ahmednagar (Central Internment Camp) inmates transferred to Dehradun February 1941.
- Diyatalawa (Ceylon). Aliens from Ceylon, Hong Kong and Singapore. Many German sailors, 756 of them sent to Canada in June 1941 (Camp 33); other males to Dehradun, females to parole camps, when camp was closed 23. February 1942
- Deolali from February 1941, later also transferred to Dehradun. 11 August 1941: 604 Germans.
- Dehradun main camp for males from September 1941. Sensibly separated in Wings 1: pro-Nazi, 2: anti-Nazi, 3: Italians. From this camp the SS mountaineer Heinrich Harrer escaped to Tibet.
- Yercaud for females from Madras Presidency. Summer 1941: 98 inmates, closed late 1942.
- Ft. Williams (Calcutta), army camp, closed early 1940, males were sent to Ahmednagar, females to Katapahar parole camp.
- Camp 17 initially in Ramgarh (Bihar), from July 1942 at Deoli (Rajputana). For the surviving internees from the Dutch Indies.
- Hazaribagh: in then Bihar; now in Jharkhand
- Smaller Parole Camps at Naini Tal, Kodaikanal and Katapahar (near Darjeeling), were all closed by late 1942. Inmates transferred to (family reunions) to the camps near Poona:
  - Satara from May 1940
  - Purandhar (lower Fort), initially for Jewish refugees, later also other Germans, many missionaries with families. In August 1945 116 Germans (45 children, 19 missionaries), 26 Italians (5 children), 68 other nationals (11 children)

Most internees were deported late 1946. Germans shipped to Hamburg were sent to the former Neuengamme concentration camp for de-Nazification.

=== Sino-Indian War ===
During the Sino-Indian War in 1962, the Indian government interned and incarcerated 3000 Chinese-Indian civilians in the desert internment camp in Deoli, Rajasthan, built by the colonial authorities in 1942 as a POW camp for Japanese, German, and Italian prisoners of war during the Second World War. The Indian government has not apologised or offered compensation to the internees as of 2020.

== Ireland ==
HMS Argenta, during the 1920s, was a vessel used by the British government as a military base and prison ship to hold Irish Republicans as part of their internment strategy.

By February 1923, under the 1922 Special Powers Act the British were detaining 263 men on Argenta, which was moored in Belfast Lough. This was supplemented with internment at other land-based sites such as Larne workhouse, Belfast Prison and Derry Gaol. Together, both the ship and the workhouse held 542 men without trial at the highest internment population level, during June 1923.

Conditions on the prison ship Argenta were "unbelievable", says author Denise Kleinrichert who penned the hidden history of the 1920s "floating gulag".

Cloistered below decks in cages which held 50 internees each, the prisoners were forced to use broken toilets which overflowed frequently into their communal area. Deprived of tables, the already weakened men ate off the contaminated floor, frequently succumbing to disease as a result.

Courtesy of author Denise Kleinrichert's lobbying efforts, the files of all the internees—most of them named in an appendix to her book—are now available for viewing at the Public Record Office of Northern Ireland.

=== World War II (Ireland) ===
During World War II, known in Ireland as the "Emergency", "K-Lines" was the part of the Curragh Camp used as an internment camp. It was used to house German soldiers, mainly navy personnel stranded in neutral Ireland. A separate section was created for Allied military, mostly British soldiers, who entered Irish territory in violation of the neutrality policy. No.1 Internment camp, that had been built by the British pre-1922, held republicans who had a suspected link to the IRA.

Later in the war, Gormanston Camp, near Balbriggan, was used to house eleven Allied airmen from operational flights, but eight were released in June 1944; three Germans were kept there for a short period in 1945.

Name of the camp	Date of		Estimated number of	
Name of the camp	Establishment	Liberation	Prisoners	Deaths
HMS Argenta near Belfast Lough, Northern Ireland	1920	1925	265	Unknown. Some from hunger strikes
Curragh Camp ("No.1") near The Curragh, County Kildare, Ireland	1939	1945	-	-
Gormanston Camp near Balbriggan, Ireland	1939	1945	14	-

== Isle of Man ==
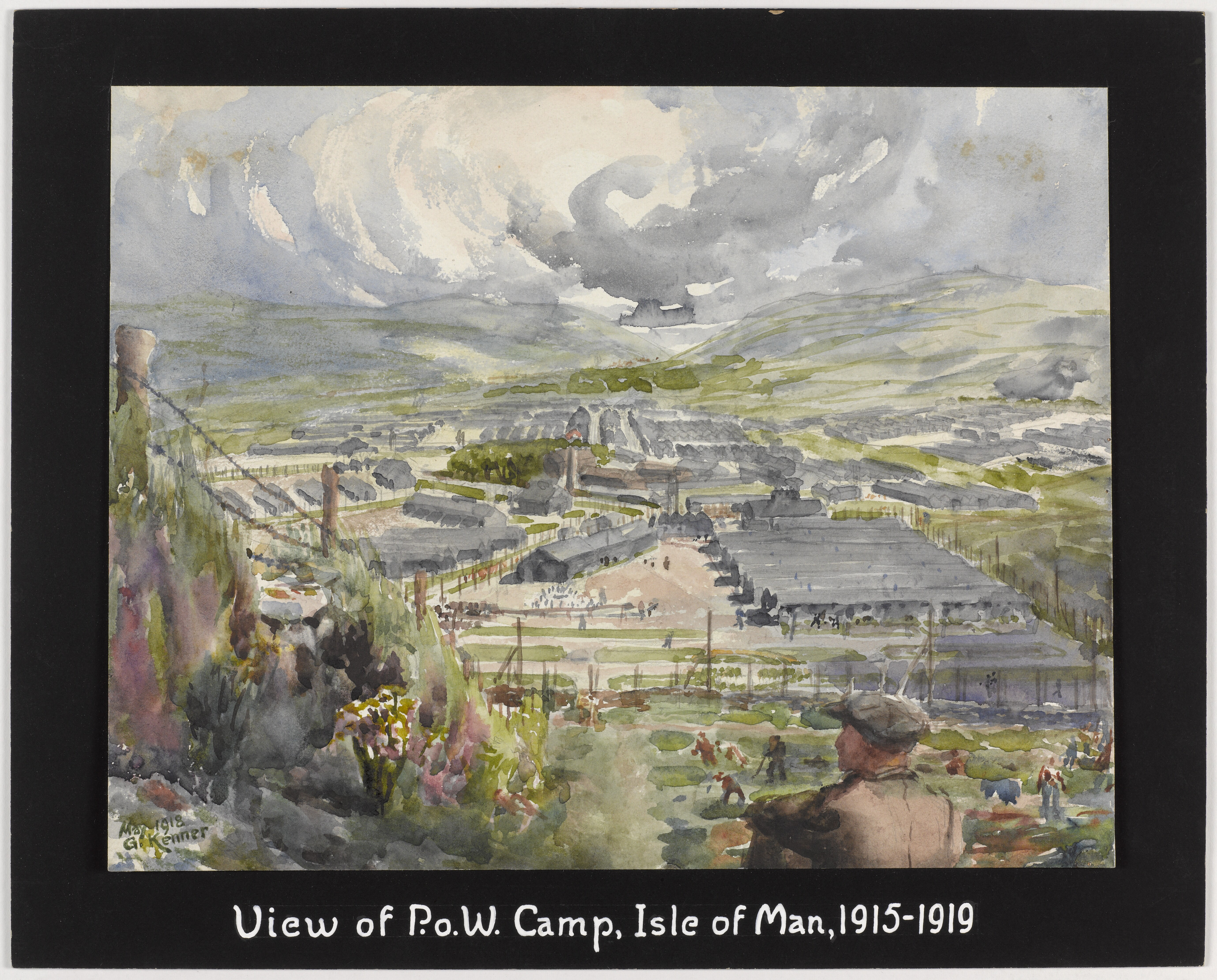
View of P.O.W. Camp, Isle of Man. The Knockaloe internment camp near Peel on the Isle of Man, May 1918, by POW George Kenner.

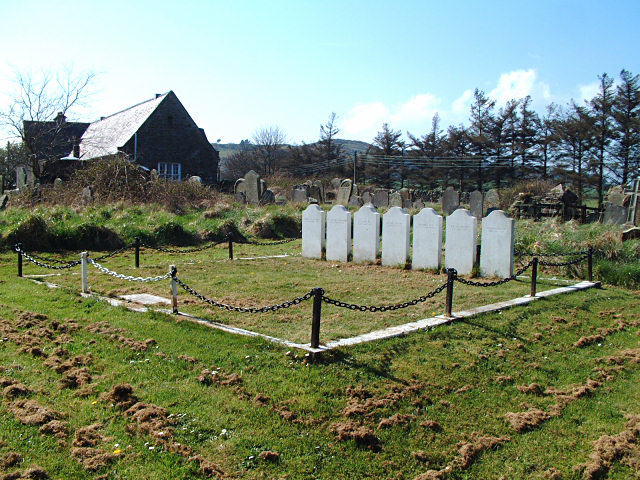
Patrick Churchyard – Isle of Man. This section of the churchyard was set aside for the graves of Turkish internees from the nearby Knockaloe internment camp, which housed over 20,000 'alien' persons during the 1914–18 war

=== World War I (Isle of Man) ===
During World War I the United Kingdom government interned male citizens of the Central Powers, principally Germany, Austria-Hungary and Ottoman Turkey in this crown dependency. They were held mainly in internment camps at Knockaloe, close to Peel, and a smaller one near Douglas.

=== World War II (Isle of Man) ===
During World War II the Isle of Man was used as the primary site for the internment of civilian enemy aliens, both male and female. The camps were predominantly in commandeered hotels and boarding houses in seaside towns on the island. Around the camps for males, barbed wire fences were erected and military guard was brought over from England. The low-risk internees were, however, allowed to work on farms on the island and to go on excursions such as for walks or to swim in the sea. The camps were in operation from 27 May 1940 to 5 September 1945. The largest recorded number of internees on the island was roughly 14,000, reached in August 1940.

There were ten camps on the island:

- Mooragh Camp, Ramsey
- Peveril Camp, Peel
- Onchan Camp, Onchan
- Rushen Camp, Port St Mary and Port Erin (for female and family internees only)
- Central Camp, Douglas
- Palace Camp, Douglas
- Metropole Camp, Douglas
- Hutchinson Camp, Douglas
- Granville Camp, Douglas
- Sefton Camp, Douglas

== Italy ==
Name of the camp	Date of establishment	Date of liberation	Estimated number of	
Name of the camp	Date of establishment	Date of liberation	Prisoners	Deaths
Baranello near Campobasso				
Campagna near Salerno	15 June 1940	19 September 1943		
Casoli near Chieti	July 1940	September 1943		
Chiesanuova near Padua	June 1942			
Cremona				
Ferramonti di Tarsia near Cosenza	Summer 1940	4 September 1943	3,800	
Finale Emila near Modena				
Giado				
Gonars near Palmanova	March 1942	8 September 1943	7,000	453; >500
Lipari				
Malo near Venice				
Molat				
Monigo near Treviso	June 1942			
Montechiarugolo near Parma				
Ponza				
Potenza				
Rab (on the island of Rab)	July 1942	11 September 1943	15,000	2,000
Renicci di Anghiari, near Arezzo	October 1942			
Risiera di San Sabba, Trieste	1943	1945		3000–5000
Sepino near Campobasso				
Treviso				
Urbisaglia				
Vestone				
Vinchiaturo, near Campobasso				
Visco, near Palmanova	Winter 1942			

== Israel ==
Israel has maintained concentration camps since its occupation of South Lebanon until the present day, holding Palestinian and Lebanese POWs, journalists, and civilians. The IDF used extreme methods of torture such as rape, electrocuting the penises of prisoners, and more, though Israel denies involvements in Khiam detention center; it has blamed its proxies in South Lebanon, SLA, for the operation of the camp. Most notably:

- Khiam detention center
- Sde Teiman detention camp

On July 7th 2025, Israeli defense minister Israel Katz has announced the creation of an enclosure within the Gaza Strip, intended for the concentration of 600 thousand Gazans at first, and eventually the entirety population of Gaza. The announced plan was described as a concentration camp by Israeli historian Amos Goldberg.

== Japan ==
=== World War II (Japan) ===
Japan conquered south-east Asia in a series of victorious campaigns over a few months from December 1941. By March 1942 many civilians, particularly westerners in the region's European colonies, found themselves behind enemy lines and were subsequently interned by the Japanese.

The nature of civilian internment varied from region to region. Some civilians were interned soon after invasion; in other areas the process occurred over many months. In total, approximately 130,000 Allied civilians were interned by the Japanese during this period of occupation. The exact number of internees will never be known as records were often lost, destroyed, or simply not kept.

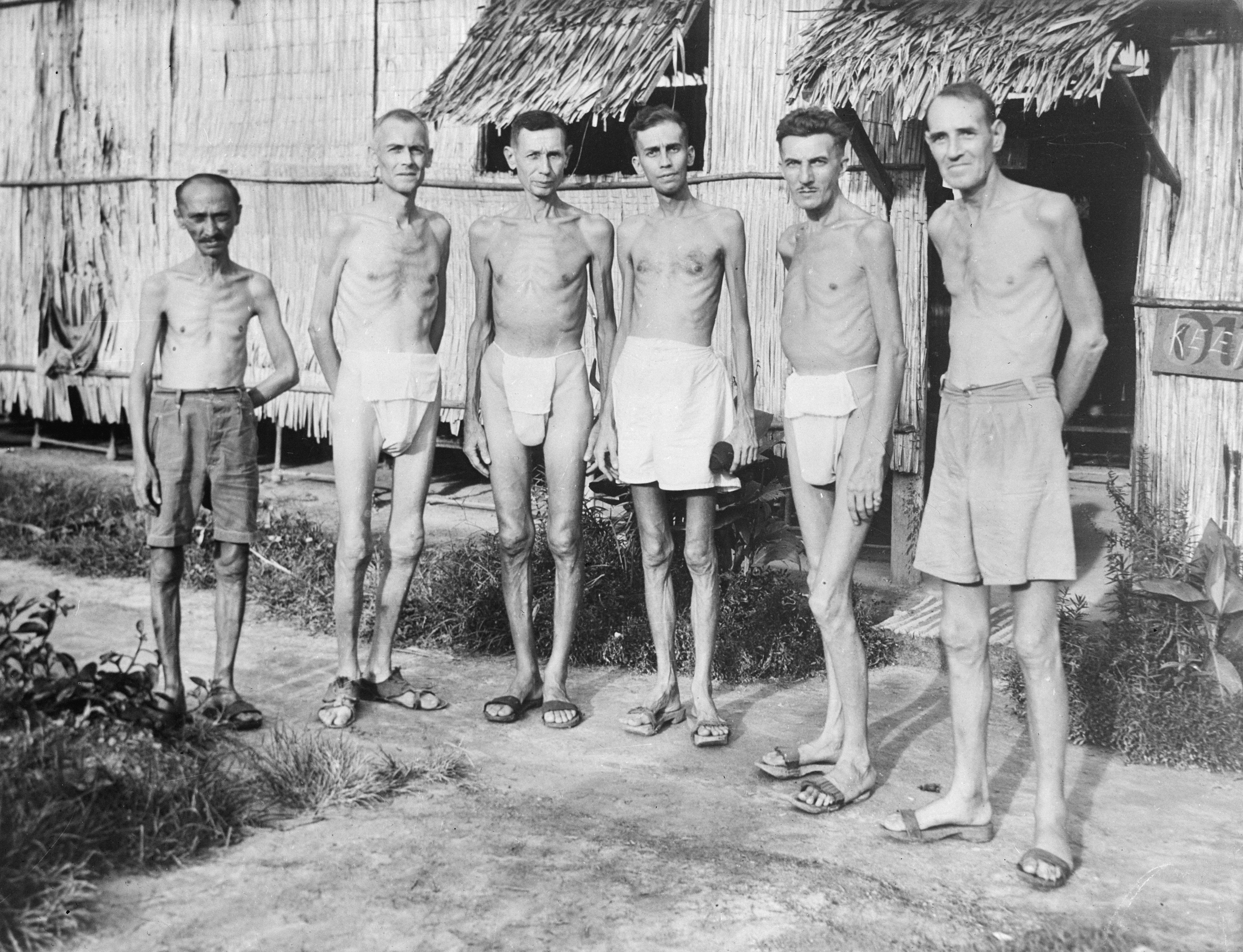
Liberated Dutch prisoners in Indonesia (Dutch East Indies) in 1945

The backgrounds of the internees were diverse. There was a large proportion of Dutch from the Dutch East Indies, but they also included Americans, British, and Australians. They included missionaries and their families, colonial administrators, and business people. Many had been living in the colonies for decades. Single women had often been nuns, missionaries, doctors, teachers and nurses.

Civilians interned by the Japanese were treated marginally better than the prisoners of war, but their death rates were the same. Although they had to work to run their own camps, few were made to labour on construction projects. The Japanese devised no consistent policies or guidelines to regulate the treatment of the civilians. Camp conditions and the treatment of internees varied from camp to camp. The general experience, however, was one of malnutrition, disease, and varying degrees of harsh discipline and brutality from the Japanese guards. Some Dutch women were forced into sexual slavery.

The camps varied in size from four people held at Pangkalpinang in Sumatra to the 14,000 held in Tjihapit in Java. Some were segregated according to gender or race, there were also many camps of mixed gender. Some internees were held at the same camp for the duration of the war, and others were moved about. The buildings used to house internees were generally whatever was available, including schools, warehouses, universities, hospitals, and prisons.

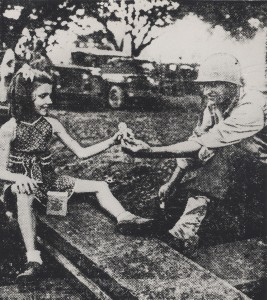
Jean-Marie Faggiano receives a doll from Private First Class Theo Tanner of the U.S. First Cavalry. Tanner had just removed the doll from a dead Japanese soldier, killed during the liberation of the Santo Tomas Internment Camp in Manila, Philippines in February 1945

Organisation of the internment camps varied by location. The Japanese administered some camps directly; others were administered by local authorities under Japanese control. Korean POWs of the Japanese were also used as camp guards. Some of the camps were left for the internees to self-govern. In the mixed and male camps, management often fell to the men who were experienced in administration before their internment. In the women's camps the leaders tended to be the women who had held a profession prior to internment. Boys over the age of ten were generally considered to be men by the Japanese and were often separated from their mothers to live and work in male camps.

One of the most famous concentration camps operated by the Japanese during World War II was at the University of Santo Tomas in Manila, the Philippines, the Santo Tomas Internment Camp. The Dominican university was expropriated by the Japanese at the beginning of the occupation, and was used to house mostly American civilians, but also British subjects, for the duration of the war. There, men, women and children suffered from malnutrition and poor sanitation. The camp was liberated in 1945.

The liberation of the camps was not a uniform process. Many camps were liberated as the forces were recapturing territory. For other internees, freedom occurred many months after the surrender of the Japanese, and in the Dutch East Indies, liberated internees faced the uncertainty of the Indonesian War of Independence.

Civilian internees were generally disregarded in official histories, and few received formal recognition. Ironically, however, civilian internees have become the subject of several influential books and films. Agnes Newton Keith's account of internment on Berhala Island in Sandakan Harbour and Batu Lintang camp, Kuching, Three Came Home (1947), was one of the first of the memoirs. More recent publications include Jeanne Tuttle and Jolanthe Zelling's "Mammie's Journal of My Childhood" (2005); Shirley Fenton-Huie's The Forgotten Ones (1992) and Jan Ruff O'Herne's Fifty Years of Silence (1997). Nevil Shute's novel A Town Like Alice was filmed in 1956, and J. G. Ballard's Empire of the Sun in 1987. Other films and television dramas have included Tenko and Paradise Road.

== Korea, Republic of ==
During the 1980s, South Korea had multiple internment camps, including the Brothers Home, which housed thousands of prisoners in Busan.

== Libya ==
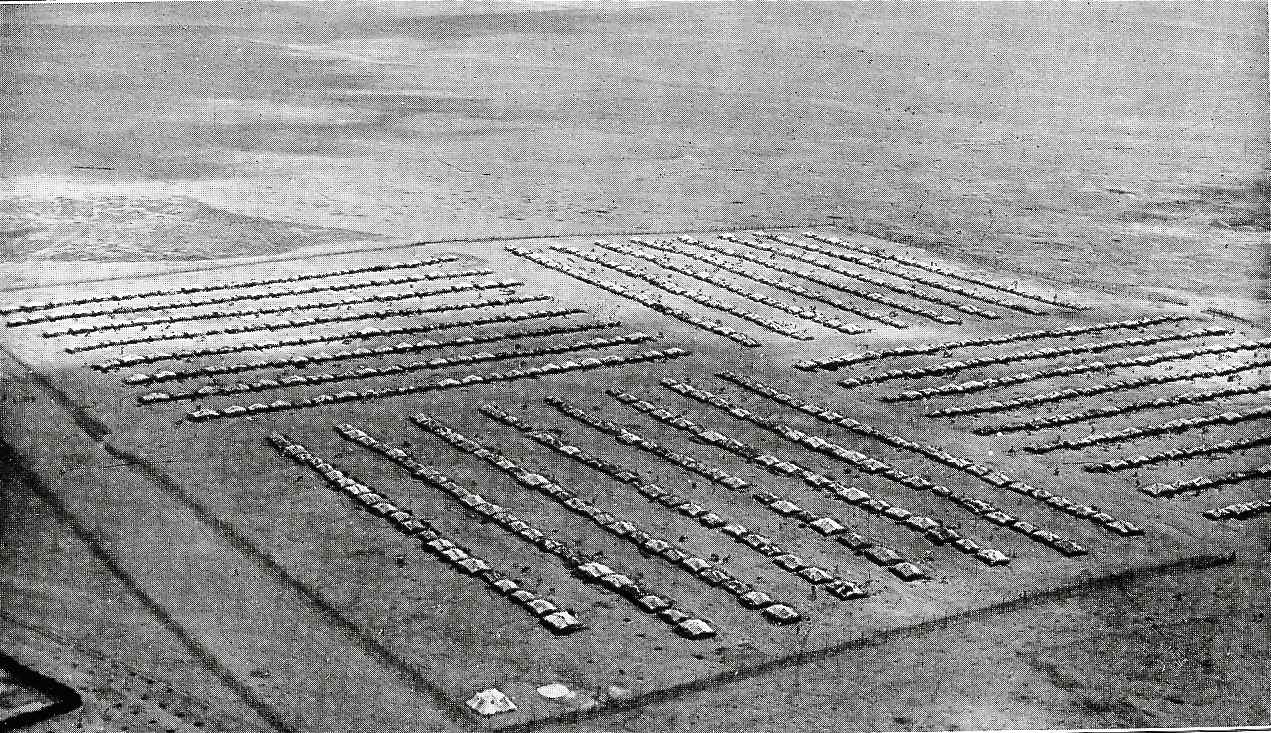
Italian concentration camp in Abyar, Libya

The history of Libya as an Italian colony started in the 1910s and it lasted until February 1947, when Italy officially lost all of the colonies of the former Italian Empire.

Fighting intensified after the accession to power in Italy of the dictator Benito Mussolini and King Idris fled Libya for the safety of Egypt in 1922. From 1922 to 1928, Italian forces under General Pietro Badoglio waged a punitive pacification campaign. Badoglio's successor in the field, Marshal Rodolfo Graziani (known as 'The Butcher of Fezzan'), accepted the commission from Mussolini on the condition that he be allowed to crush the Libyan resistance unencumbered by the restraints of either Italian or international law. Reportedly, Mussolini immediately agreed and Graziani intensified the oppression. The Libyans continued to defend themselves, with the strongest voices of dissent coming from the Cyrenaica. Omar Mukhtar, a Senussi sheikh, became the leader of the uprising.

Soon afterwards, the colonial administration began the wholesale deportation of the people of Cyrenaica to deny the rebels the support of the local population. The forced migration of more than 100,000 people ended in concentration camps in Suluq- ALa byer and Al Agheila where tens of thousands died in squalid conditions. It is estimated (by Arab historians) that the number of Libyans who died – killed either through combat or mainly through starvation, execution and disease – is at a minimum of 80,000 or even up to one third of the Cyrenaican population.

== Mexico ==
During WW2 the US pressured Mexico to deport Japanese Mexicans to the US for internment and when Mexico refused, pressured Mexico to displace and intern them. One such camp was located in Temixco, Morelos. Today it is a popular swimming resort.

In March 2025, a group looking for missing persons in Mexico found over 200 pairs of shoes and three clandestine crematoriums in a ranch just outside of Teuchitlán, Jalisco. The ranch was used by the Jalisco New Generation Cartel as a recruitment center and extermination camp.

== Montenegro ==
The fort on the island of Mamula was converted into a concentration camp by the fascist forces of Benito Mussolini's Kingdom of Italy.

During the 1991 to 1995 Croatian War of Independence, the Yugoslav People's Army organized the Morinj camp near Kotor, Montenegro.

== Netherlands ==
=== World War I (Netherlands) ===
During World War I, all foreign soldiers and ship crews that illegally entered the neutral Netherlands were interned in a specific camp based on their nationality (to avoid conflict). By far the largest camp was the one for British sailors and soldiers in Groningen. Unlike the Prisoners of War in the neighbouring countries at the time, Dutch prisoners had plenty of food, and tradesmen often came to the camp with a wide range of goods. The interned were paid a certain amount of compensation money by the Dutch authorities on top of any British aid that was channeled to them through the Dutch government. One prisoner later commented: "... we were quite well off, and the local people were very good to us."

After a revolt in 1926 in the Dutch East Indies, a concentration camp for political prisoners was set up in what then was called Netherlands New Guinea, in the very remote jungle at Boven-Digoel (Upper Digul). More camps were established for supposed German sympathizers at the start of World War II, including one at Onrust Island and one in Ngawi Regency. In Surinam, they also built camps for German nationals and German sympathizers, including one at Jodensavanne and one at Copieweg.

=== World War II (Netherlands) ===
Just before World War II engulfed the Netherlands, a camp was built in 1939 at Westerbork by the Dutch government for interning Jewish refugees who had fled Nazi Germany. During the German occupation this camp was used as a transit camp for Dutch Jews eventually deported to extermination camps in the East. Amersfoort (1941–1945) (in German: Polizeiliches Durchgangslager) was also a transit camp. The Herzogenbusch camp (1943–1944, known as Kamp Vught because of its location in that town) was a concentration camp, the only one in Western Europe outside Germany set up as well as run by the SS.

Other camps were Camp Schoorl near Schoorl, Kamp Sint-Michielsgestel and Camp Erika near Ommen. Before the Shoah began, some two dozen labor camps for Jewish men were operated fulfilling an order of the German occupiers. In the Dutch East Indies, after the occupation of the Netherlands by the Germans in Europe started on 15 May 1940, Germans living in the Indies were rounded up and interned there. Almost all camps also had field offices for forced labor. In the cases of Vught as well as Amersfoort, there were work details for Philips factories, often under relatively favourable circumstances. Also, the huge construction activities for the 30 German airfields in the Netherlands relied partly upon labour from camps.

After the war, the Dutch government launched Operation Black Tulip and started to gather the civil population of German background in concentration camps near the German border, especially Nijmegen, in order to deport them from the country. In total around 15% of the German population in the Netherlands was deported.

Numerous improvised and official camps were set up after the war, to keep Dutch who were suspected of collaboration with the Germans. Kamp Westerbork at one point housed some Jews as well as suspected collaborators and Germans. In these camps, a history of maltreatment by the guards, sometimes leading to death, has been collected.

=== Indonesian National Revolution ===
During the Indonesian National Revolution, the war between the Netherland and Indonesia after World War II, the Dutch once again set up internment camps on territory they controlled in Indonesia, to detain Indonesian nationalists and captured members of the Indonesian armed forces.

== New Zealand ==
In World War I German civilians living in New Zealand were interned in camps on Motuihe and Somes Islands. German, Italian and Japanese civilians were interned in World War II.

== Norway ==
During World War II, the Beisfjord massacre took place at the "No. 1 camp Beisfjord" (Lager I Beisfjord).

== Korea, Democratic People's Republic of ==
Concentration camps came into being in North Korea in the wake of the country's liberation from Japanese colonial rule at the end of World War II. Those persons considered "adversary class forces", such as landholders, Japanese collaborators, religious devotees and the families of people who migrated to the South, were rounded up and detained in large facilities. Additional camps were later established in the late 1950s and 1960s in order to incarcerate the political victims of power struggles along with their families as well as overseas Koreans who migrated to the North. Later, the number of camps saw a marked increase with the cementing of the Kim Il Sung dictatorship and the Kim Jong Il succession. About a dozen concentration camps were in operation until the early 1990s, but some of them were closed and merged into the remaining six camps for the purpose of maintaining better secrecy and control.

North Korea is known to operate six concentration camps, currently accommodating around 200,000 prisoners. These camps, officially called Kwan-li-so (Korean for "control and management center"), are large political penal-labor colonies in secluded mountain valleys of central and northeastern North Korea. Once condemned as political criminals in North Korea, the defendants and three generations of their families (including children and old people) are incarcerated in one of the camps without trial and cut off from all outside contact. Prisoners reportedly work 14-hour days at hard labor and they are also forced to undergo ideological re-education. Starvation, torture and disease are commonplace. Political criminals invariably receive life sentences.

Concentration camps in operation	Area	Prisoners
Kwan-li-so No. 14 Kaechon	155 km^{2} (60 mi^{2})	15,000
Kwan-li-so No. 15 Yodok	378 km^{2} (146 mi^{2})	46,500
Kwan-li-so No. 16 Hwasong	549 km^{2} (212 mi^{2})	10,000
Kwan-li-so No. 18 Pukchang	73 km^{2} (28 mi^{2})	50,000
Kwan-li-so No. 22 Hoeryong	225 km^{2} (87 mi^{2})	50,000
Kwan-li-so No. 25 Chongjin	0.25 km^{2} (0.1 mi^{2})	3,000+

Former concentration camps	Date closed
Kwan-li-so No. 11 Kyongsong	October 1989
Kwan-li-so No. 12 Onsong	May 1987
Kwan-li-so No. 13 Chongsong	December 1990
Kwan-li-so No. 26 Hwachon	January 1991
Kwan-li-so No. 27 Chonma	November 1990

Kang Chol-hwan is a former prisoner of Yodok concentration camp and has written a book (The Aquariums of Pyongyang) about his time in the camp. Shin Dong-hyuk is the only person known to have escaped from Kaechon internment camp and gave an account of his time in the camp.

== Ottoman Empire and Turkey ==
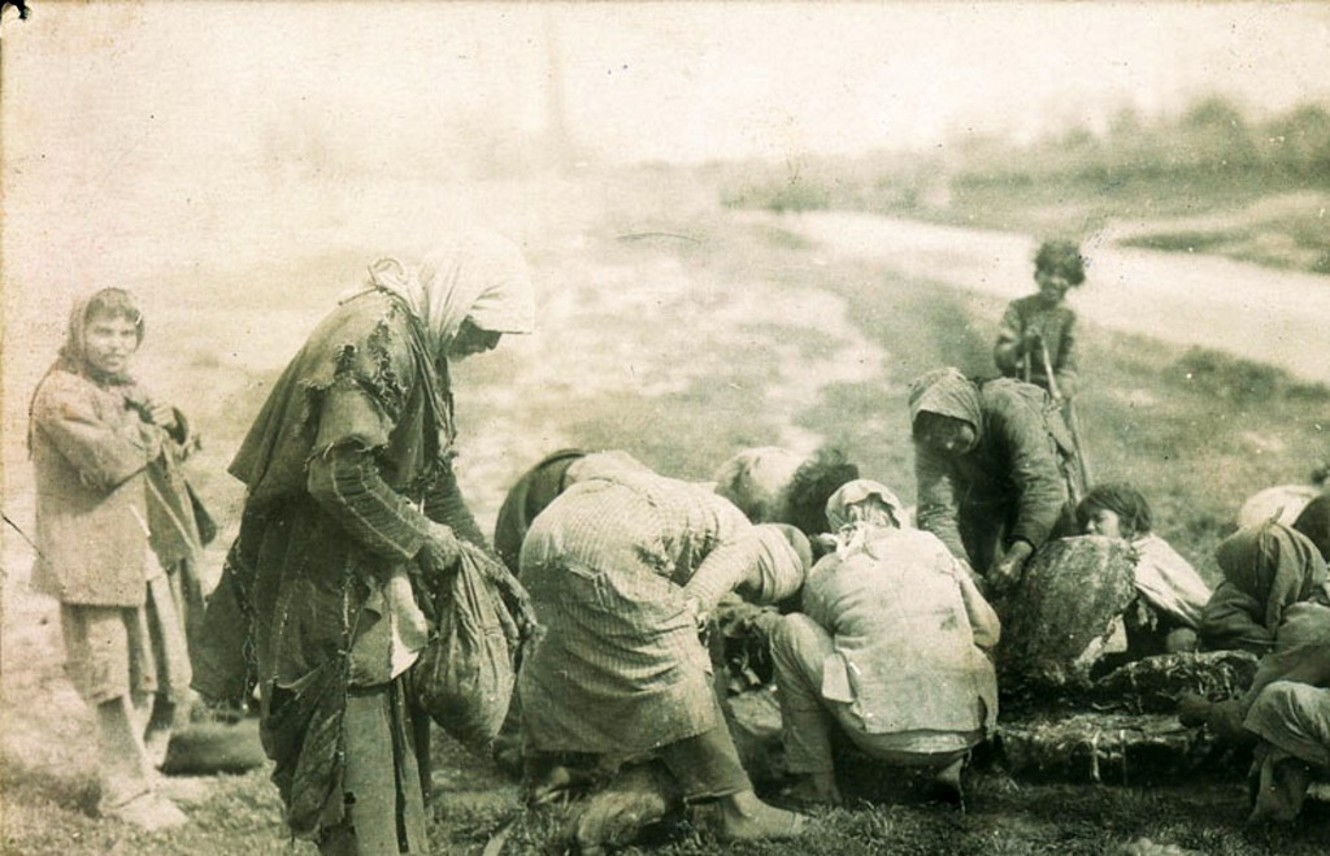
Armenian refugees collected near the body of a dead horse at Deir ez-Zor, during the Armenian genocide

Concentration camps known as Deir ez-Zor camps operated in the heart of the Syrian desert during 1915–1916, where many thousands of Armenian refugees were forced into death marches during the Armenian genocide. The United States vice-consul in Aleppo, Jesse B. Jackson, estimated that Armenian refugees, as far east as Deir ez-Zor and south of Damascus, numbered 150,000, all of whom were virtually destitute.

== Paraguay ==
Shortly before his absolute 26-year rule of Paraguay, in 1813 Dr. José Gaspar Rodríguez de Francia, then vice-consul of Paraguay, ordered the construction of the concentration camp of Tevego, situated on the Bolivian frontier bordering the Chaco to the west, and a marsh to the east. It was guarded by a squadron of mulatto lancers, but was unable to fend off constant attacks from Indians, leading to its eventual abandonment in 1823.

== Poland ==
Camps for Russian prisoners and internees in Poland existed during 1919–1924. It is estimated between 16,000 and 20,000 Soviet soldiers held in the Polish POW camps died, out of the total of 80,000 to 85,000 prisoners.

From 1934 to 1939 the government of Poland established Bereza Kartuska Prison for the internment of political opponents, Ukrainian nationalists and Communists in Bereza Kartuska (now in Belarus).

During World War II, Nazi Germany established many of its concentration camps in Occupied Poland. After World War II, the Soviet Army and the Communist government of Poland used some of the former German concentration camps as POW camps and they were later used as internment camps where Polish opponents of the Communists and the Soviets, as well as Ukrainians and ethnic Germans or their sympathizers, were imprisoned.

- Central Labour Camp Potulice
- Central Labour Camp Jaworzno
- Zgoda labour camp
- Łambinowice

Attempts were later made to bring two of the camp commandants to justice; Salomon Morel and Czesław Gęborski. Gęborski spent 22 months in prison and died during his judicial process.

== Portugal ==
- Tarrafal concentration camp, used from 1936 to 1974 in the Portuguese colony of Cape Verde.

== Romania ==
The Kingdom of Romania established the Bogdanovka concentration camp for Jews in Transnistria Governorate.

== Russia and the Soviet Union ==
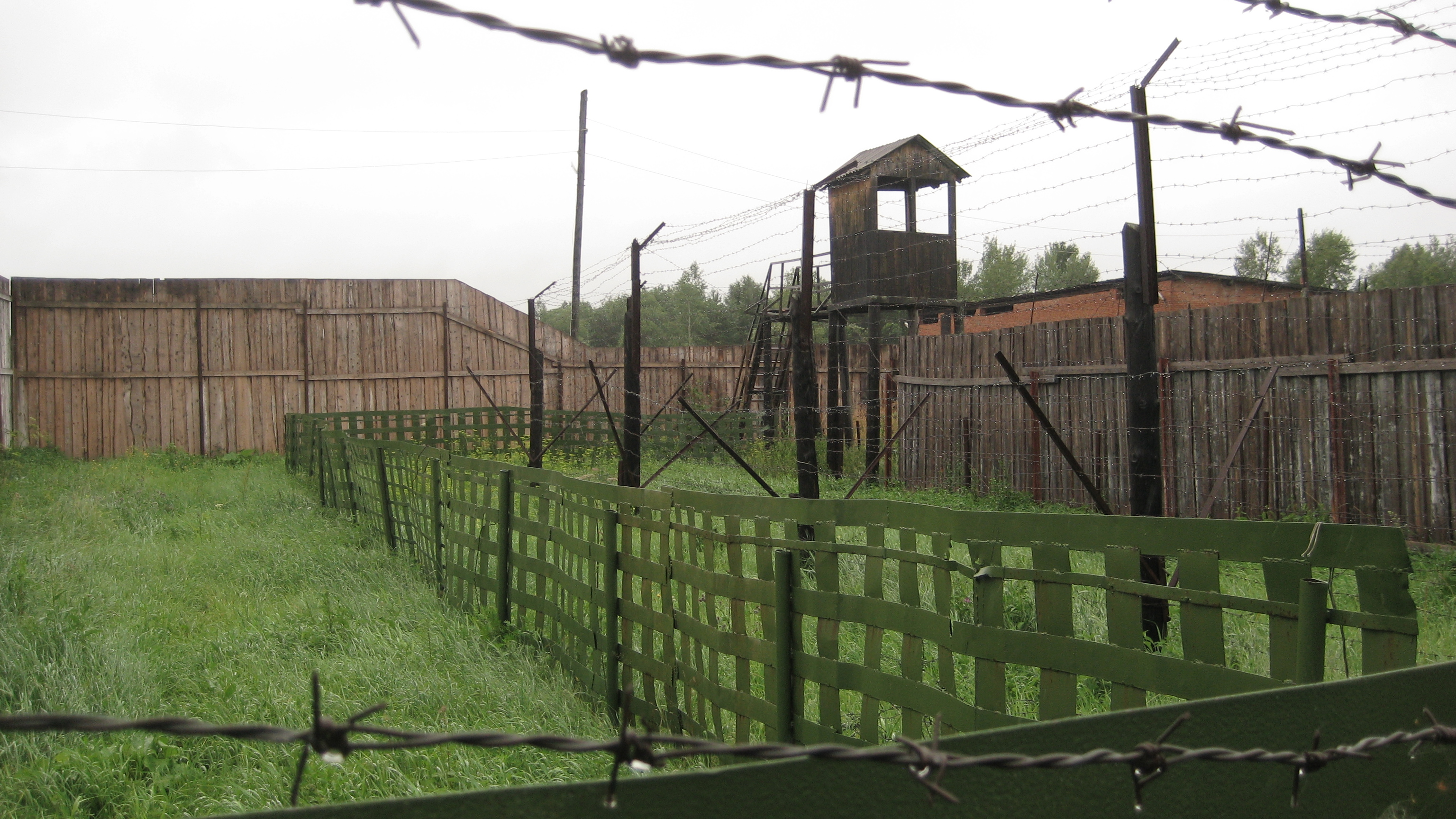
The fence at the old Gulag camp in Perm-36, founded in 1943

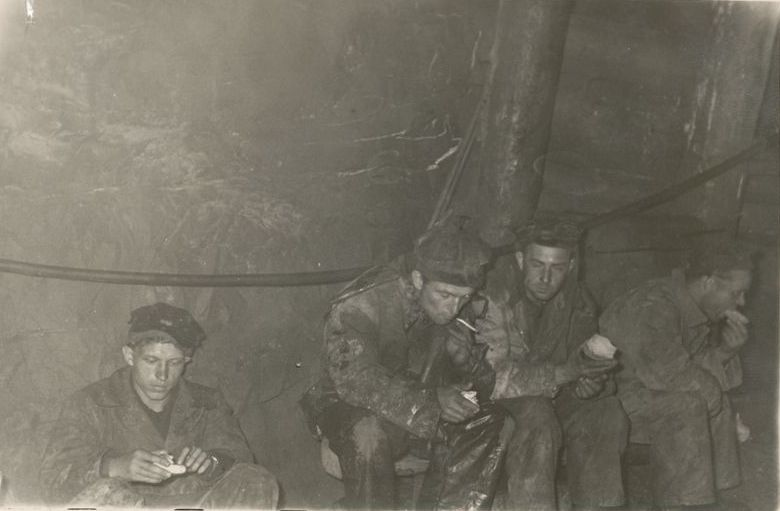
Political prisoners on a break inside a mine in Dzhezkazgan, part of the Soviet Gulag system, in 1951–1960

In Imperial Russia, penal labor camps were known by the name katorga.

The first Soviet camps were organized in June 1918 for the detention of Czechoslovak soldiers. The Solovki prison camp existed since 1923.

In the Soviet Union, labour penitentiary camps were simply called camps, almost always plural ("lagerya"). These were used as forced labor camps, and they had small percentages of political prisoners. After Aleksandr Solzhenitsyn's book titled The Gulag Archipelago was published, they became known to the rest of the world as Gulags, after the branch of the NKVD (state security service) that managed them. (In the Russian language, the term is used to denote the whole system, rather than individual camps.)

In addition to what is sometimes referred to as the Gulag proper (consisting of the "corrective labor camps") there were "corrective labor colonies", originally intended for prisoners with short sentences, and "special resettlements" of deported peasants. At its peak, the system held a combined total of 2,750,000 prisoners. In all, perhaps more than 18,000,000 people passed through the Gulag system in 1929–1953, and millions more were deported and exiled to remote areas of the Soviet Union.

Of the 5.7 million Soviet prisoners of war who were captured by the Germans, 3.5 million of them had died in German captivity by the end of the war.

After World War II, some 3,000,000 German POWs and civilians were sent to Soviet labor camps, as part of war reparations by forced labor.

=== After the 1990s ===
During the Second Chechen War, the Russian forces used the Chernokozovo internment camp as the main center of their filtration camp system in Chechnya from 1999 to 2003 to suppress Chechnya's independence movement. Tens of thousands of Chechens were arrested and detained in these camps. According to Chechen witnesses, the inmates were beaten while some women were raped by Russian soldiers.

Since early 2017, there have been reports of gay concentration camps in Ramzan Kadyrov's Chechnya, which are allegedly being used for the extrajudicial detention and torture of men who are suspected of being gay or bisexual. Around 100 men have been imprisoned and at least three people have already died. Chechnya is a predominantly Muslim, ultra-conservative society in which homophobia is widespread and homosexuality is taboo, and where having a gay relative is seen as a "stain on the entire extended family".

An extensive list of Gulag camps is being compiled based on official sources.

== Serbia ==
During World War II (operated by German Gestapo):

- Banjica concentration camp (near Belgrade)
- Sajmište concentration camp (near Belgrade)
- Topovske Šupe (in Belgrade)
- Milišić's brickyard (in Belgrade)
- Crveni krst (in Niš)
- Svilara (Pančevo)
- Paraćin

During the Yugoslav Wars:

- Begejci camp
- Sremska Mitrovica prison (in Sremska Mitrovica)
- Stajićevo camp (near Zrenjanin)

During the Kosovo War (operated by KLA):

- Lapušnik prison camp, (near Glogovac)

== Slovakia ==
During the Second World War, the Slovak government made a small number (Nováky, Sereď) of transit camps for Jewish citizens. They were transported to Auschwitz-Birkenau and Ravensbrück concentration camps. For German help with aryanization of Slovakia, the Slovak government paid a fee of 500 Reichsmark for each Jew.

== Spain ==
The Spanish army first used concentration camps called reconcentrados (reconcentration camps) during the 1868-78 Ten Years' War in Cuba. Spanish forces detained Cuban civilians in camps to more easily combat guerrilla forces. Spain used concentration camps again in Cuba with Valeriano Weyler's Reconcentration policy during the 1895-98 Cuban War of Independence where rural Cubans were relocated to concentration camps. Upwards of 200,000 Cubans died by disease and famine in these environments.

There were also Francoist concentration camps. During the 21st century, immigration detention centers known as CIEs (Centro de Internamiento de Extranjeros) are run by the Spanish Ministry of the Interior. Various civil organizations, such as (APDHA, SOS Racismo and Andalucía Acoge) have appealed to the Spanish Supreme Court to declare the regulations behind the CIEs null and void for violating eight aspects of human rights.

== Sri Lanka ==
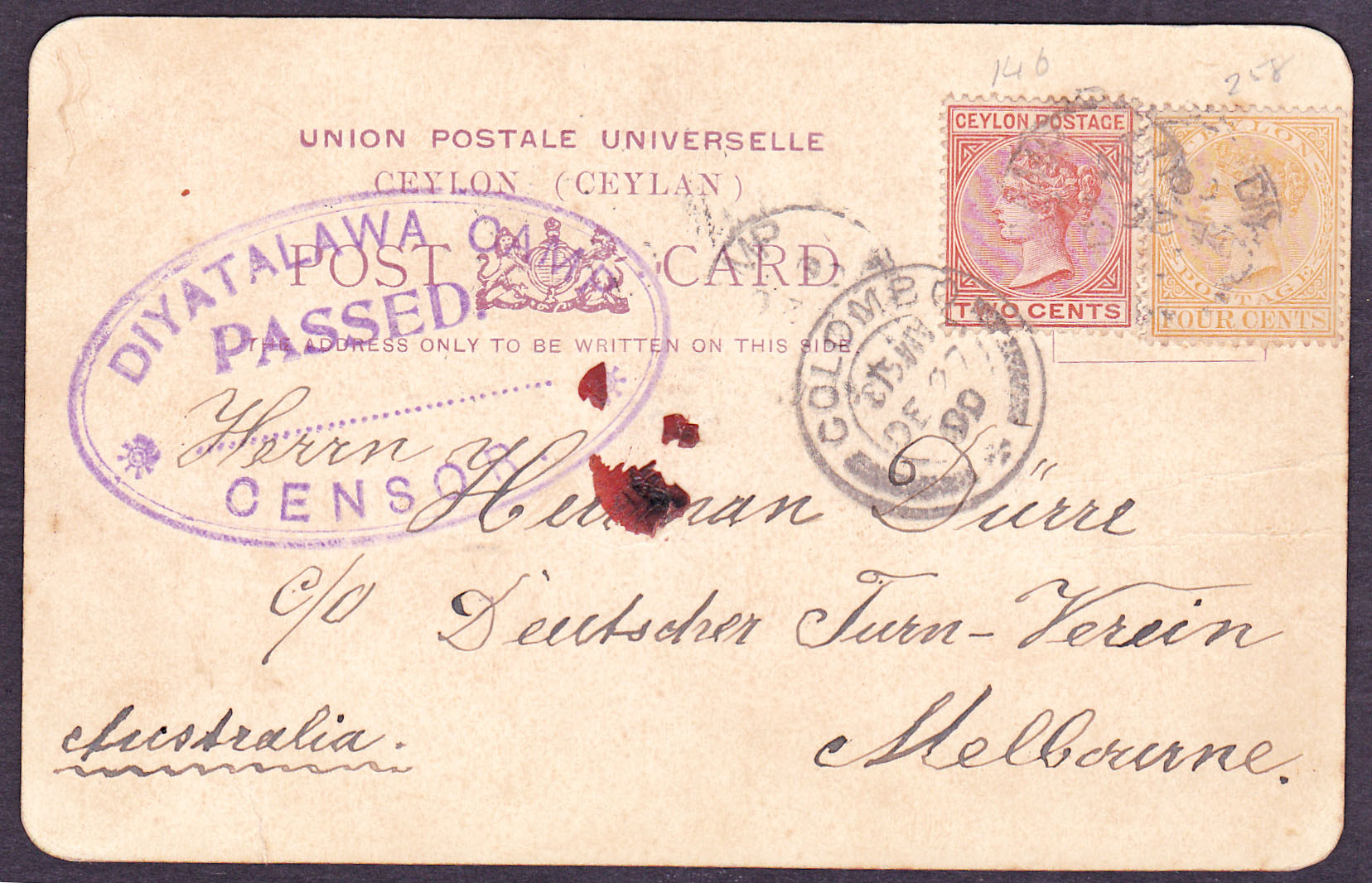
Postcard from the Boer War Prisoner-of-war Camp at Diyatalawa in 1900

In 1900, the British War Office constructed a concentration camp in Diyatalawa to house Boer prisoners captured in the Second Boer War. Initially constructed to house 2,500 prisoners and 1,000 guards and staff, the number of prisoners increased to 5,000.

In late 2008, as the Sri Lankan civil war drew to a close, the Sri Lankan Government established a number of camps to hold displaced people who managed to escape the war zone. Between October 2008 and May 2009 290,000 displaced people were moved into the camps in government controlled territory. These camps were guarded by the Sri Lankan military and surrounded by barbed wire. The displaced people were not allowed to leave the camps and aid agencies were not allowed inside the camps. The camps were described as internment camps by some NGO's, journalists and aid workers.

The conditions in the camps were below minimum humanitarian standards. There were reports of rape, torture, disappearances and arbitrary detention within the camps. In early May 2009, days before the civil war ended, the government gave assurances that over 80% of the displaced people would be resettled by the end of 2009. As the government failed to honour this commitment international concern grew over the slow pace of resettlement. The resettlement process accelerated in late 2009 but it was not until September 2012, four years after they were established, the camps were officially closed.

== Sweden ==
During the Second World War, the Swedish government operated eight internment camps.

- The most famous is probably Storsien outside Kalix in Norrbotten where about 300–370 communists, syndicalists and pacifists were kept during the winter 1939–1940.
- Naartijärvi east of Luleå
- Öxnered at Vänersborg
- Grytan outside Östersund
- Bercut, a boat for sailors outside Dalarö
- Vindeln: constructed in Västerbotten in 1943
- Stensele: constructed in Västerbotten in 1943
- Lövnäsvallen outside Sveg

In May 1941 a total of ten camps for 3,000–3,500 were planned, but towards the end of 1941 the plans were put on ice and in 1943 the last camp was closed down. All the records were burned. After the war many of those who had been put in the camps had trouble finding work as few wanted to hire "subversive elements".

The Navy had at least one special detainment ship for communists and "troublemakers".

Most of the camps were not labour camps with the exception of Vindeln and Stensele where the internees were used to build a secret airbase.

Foreign soldiers were put in camps in Långmora and Smedsbo, German refugees and deserters in Rinkaby. After the Second World War three camps were used for Baltic refugees from Lithuania, Latvia and Estonia (including 150 Baltic soldiers) at Ränneslätt, Rinkaby and Gälltofta.

== Switzerland ==
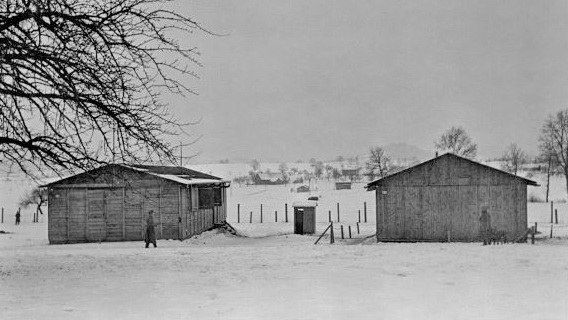
Wauwilermoos camp assumably in winter 1943/44

During World War II more than 100,000 mainly Allied soldiers were interned in Switzerland. These included internees from the UK, France, Poland and Russia, and Italians and Germans who had fled combat. The Swiss government was required to keep these soldiers interned until the end of the hostilities, in line with the Geneva Convention of 1929. The soldiers were held in barracks, and they were used as workers for agriculture and industry, except for the officers, who not were compelled to forced labour and stayed in unoccupied mountain hotels, mainly in Davos.

In contrast, civilians, for instance Jewish refugees, were usually sent back to the territories occupied by the Nazi regime.

The Swiss government operated during World War II in Switzerland at least three internment camps:

- Wauwilermoos internment camp was an internment, then later prisoner-of-war camp, situated in the municipalities of Wauwil and Egolzwil in the Canton of Luzern. Established in 1940, Wauwilermoos was a penal camp for internees, mainly Allied soldiers, among them members of the United States Army Air Forces, who were sentenced for attempting to escape from other Swiss camps for interned soldiers, or for other offenses. The intolerable conditions at the Wauwilermoos prison camp were later described by numerous former inmates, by various contemporary reports and studies; especially the imposed extremely harsh detention conditions.
- Hünenberg
- Les Diablerets

In addition, there were a number of regular internment camps.

== Syria ==
From 1986 to 2024, Ba'athist Syria operated Sednaya Prison near Damascus to house political prisoners anti-government rebels, and civilian detainees. The prison had been described as a concentration camp or a death camp, owing to systematic torture and extremely high rates of extrajudical executions, with the Syrian Observatory for Human Rights estimating 30,000 prisoners killed since the outbreak of the Syrian civil war.

== United Kingdom and colonies ==
=== Bermuda ===
During the Second Boer War, several small islands in Bermuda's Great Sound were used as natural concentration camps, despite protests by the local government. 4,619 Boers were interned on these islands, compared to Bermuda's total population of around 17,000; at least 34 Boers died in transit to Bermuda.

=== Cyprus ===
After World War II, British efforts to prevent Jewish emigration into their Palestine Mandate led to the construction of internment camps in Cyprus where up to 30,000 Holocaust survivors were held at any one time to prevent their entry into the country. They were released in February 1949 after the founding of Israel.

=== England ===
During World War I Irish republicans were imprisoned in camps in Shrewsbury and Bromyard.

During World War II, initially, refugees who had fled from Germany were also included, as were suspected British Nazi sympathisers such as British Union of Fascists leader Oswald Mosley. The British government rounded up 74,000 German, Austrian and Italian aliens. Within 6 months the 112 alien tribunals had individually summoned and examined 64,000 aliens, and the vast majority were released, having been found to be "friendly aliens" (mostly Jews); examples include Hermann Bondi and Thomas Gold and later members of the Amadeus Quartet. British nationals were detained under Defence Regulation 18B. Eventually only 2,000 of the remainder were interned. Initially they were shipped overseas, but that was halted when a German U-boat sank the SS Arandora Star in July 1940 with the loss of 800 internees, though this was not the first loss that had occurred. The last internees were released late in 1945, though many were released in 1942. In Britain, internees were housed in camps and prisons. Some camps had tents rather than buildings with internees sleeping directly on the ground. Men and women were separated and most contact with the outside world was denied. A number of prominent Britons including writer H. G. Wells campaigned against the internment of refugees.

=== Ireland: pre-1922 ===
During the Irish war of independence of 1919 to 1921, 12,000 Irish people were held without trial. During this war Ballykinlar Barracks Internment Camp, County Down held over 2,000 men from all 32 Counties of Ireland.

=== Kenya ===
During the 1954–60 Mau Mau rebellion in Kenya, camps were established to hold suspected rebels. It is unclear how many were held, but estimates range from 80,000 to 160,000 of the Kikuyu population, with 1,090 Mau Mau detainees sentenced to death and executed by hanging. Maltreatment is said to have included torture and summary executions.

=== Malaya ===
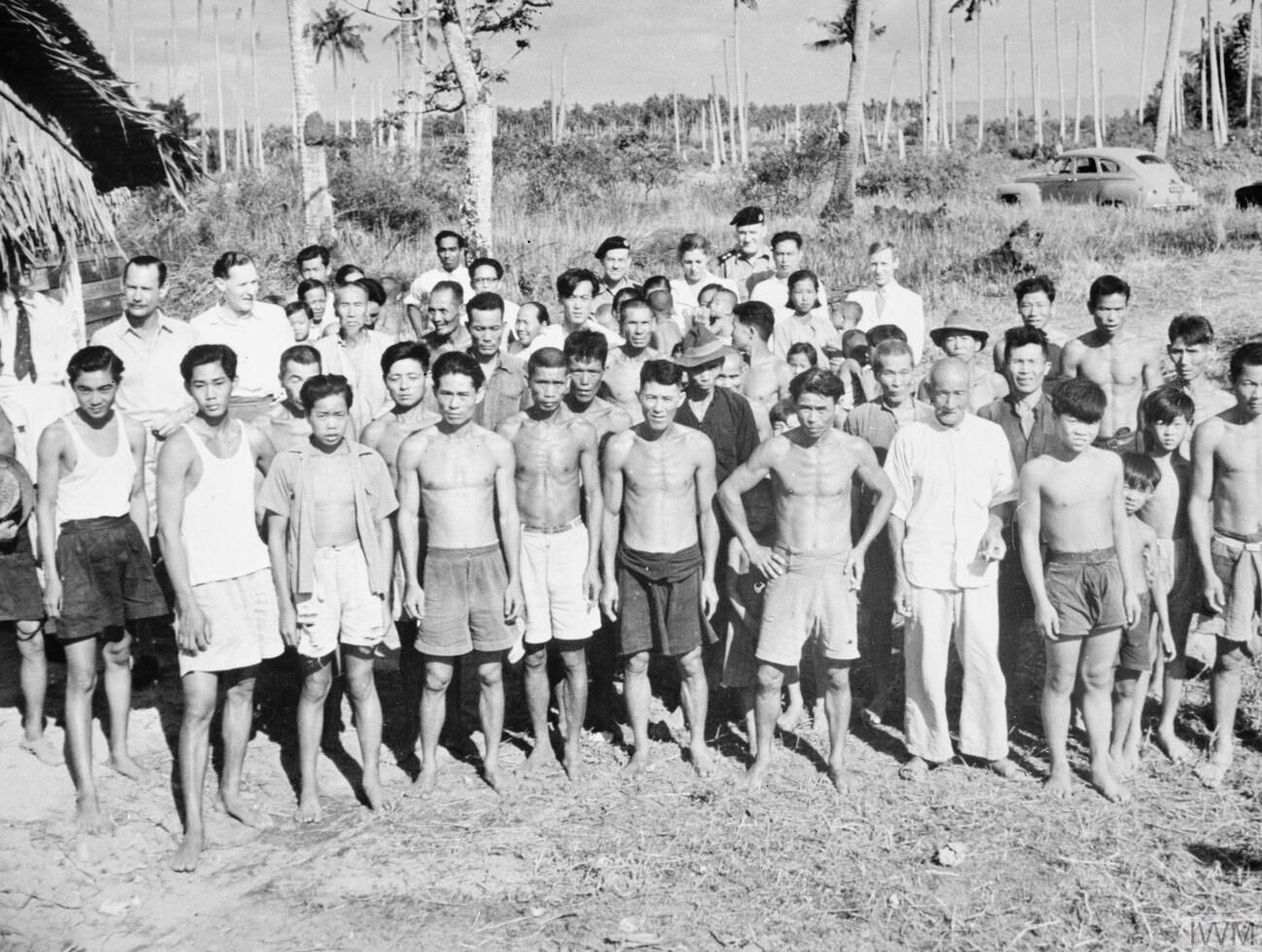
Civilians forcefully relocated by the British military as part of the Briggs Plan

Beginning in 1950, under the Briggs Plan (a response to the Malayan Emergency) Chinese squatters were relocated to hundreds of internment camps in various areas of the Malay Peninsula. Known as New Villages, these camps were intended to become permanent settlements. As attacks by the Malayan Communist Party declined, the curfews were lifted, fences removed, and the camps gradually ceased to be internment camps. To this day many villages founded in this way are known as New Villages and remain ethnically Chinese.

=== Northern Ireland ===
One of the most famous examples of modern internment (and one which made world headlines) occurred in Northern Ireland in 1971, when hundreds of nationalists and Irish Republicans were arrested by the British Army and the Royal Ulster Constabulary on the orders of then Prime Minister of Northern Ireland, Brian Faulkner, with the backing of the British government. Historians generally view that period of internment as inflaming sectarian tensions in Northern Ireland while failing in its stated aim of arresting members of the paramilitary Provisional IRA. Many of the people arrested were completely unconnected with the Provisional IRA but, through bungling and incompetence, had their names appear on the list of those to be interned, while over 100 IRA men escaped arrest. The backlash against internment and its bungled application contributed to the decision of the British government under Prime Minister Edward Heath to suspend the Stormont governmental system in Northern Ireland and replace it with Direct rule from London, under the authority of a British Secretary of State for Northern Ireland.

From 1971 internment began, beginning with the arrest of 342 suspected republican guerrillas and paramilitary members on 9 August. They were held at HM Prison Maze then called Long Kesh Detention Centre. By 1972, 924 men were interned. Serious rioting ensued, and 23 people died in three days. The British government attempted to show some balance by arresting some loyalist paramilitaries later, but out of the 1,981 men interned, only 107 were loyalists. Internment was ended in 1975, but had resulted in increased support for the IRA and created political tensions which culminated in the 1981 Irish Hunger Strike and the death of Bobby Sands, member of British Parliament (Anti H-Block/Armagh Political Prisoner Party.) His death resulted in a new surge of IRA recruitment and activity. The imprisonment of people under anti-terrorism laws specific to Northern Ireland continued until the Good Friday Agreement of 1998, but these laws required the right to a fair trial be respected. However non-jury Diplock courts tried paramilitary-related trials, to prevent jury intimidation.

Many of those interned were held in a detention facility located at RAF Long Kesh military base, later known as Long Kesh Detention Centre and eventually becoming Her Majesty's Prison Maze, outside Belfast. Internment had previously been used as a means of repressing the Irish Republican Army. It was used between 1939–1945 and 1956–1962. On all these occasions, internment has had a somewhat limited success.

Name of the camp	Date of establishment	Date of liberation	Estimated nos. of	
Name of the camp	Date of establishment	Date of liberation	Prisoners	Deaths
Long Kesh Detention Centre. Later converted to HM Prison Maze near Belfast, Northern Ireland.	First use: 1939; Second use: 1956; Third use: 1971	1945; 1962; 1975; Imprisonment of people under anti-terrorism laws specific to Northern Ireland continued until the Good Friday Agreement of 1998.	> 1,981	#? Some from hunger strikes

=== Scotland ===
During the Second World War the British government allowed the Polish Government in Exile to establish and run its own internment camps in Scotland. Locations as identified by the historian Simon Webb include Rothesay on the Isle of Bute, and Tighnabruaich on the Scottish mainland. Rothesay was used to house the political enemies of the leader of the Polish Government in Exile, Władysław Sikorski, as well as Poles considered by Sikorski's Government in Exile of being morally dubious. Tighnabruaich held criminals under the jurisdiction of the Polish Government in Exile. Webb claims the Poles were later allowed to open further camps at Kingledoors, Auchterarder and Inverkeithing near Edinburgh. Although deaths, and claims of torture and privations were made by numerous British Members of Parliament against the internment camps, the camps were treated as sovereign Polish territory and local Scottish police forces were unable to investigate what happened in them. Webb also suggests that being Jewish or a suspected Communist was often enough to lead to Polish citizens under the jurisdiction of the Polish Government in Exile being sent to one of the internment camps.

=== South Africa ===
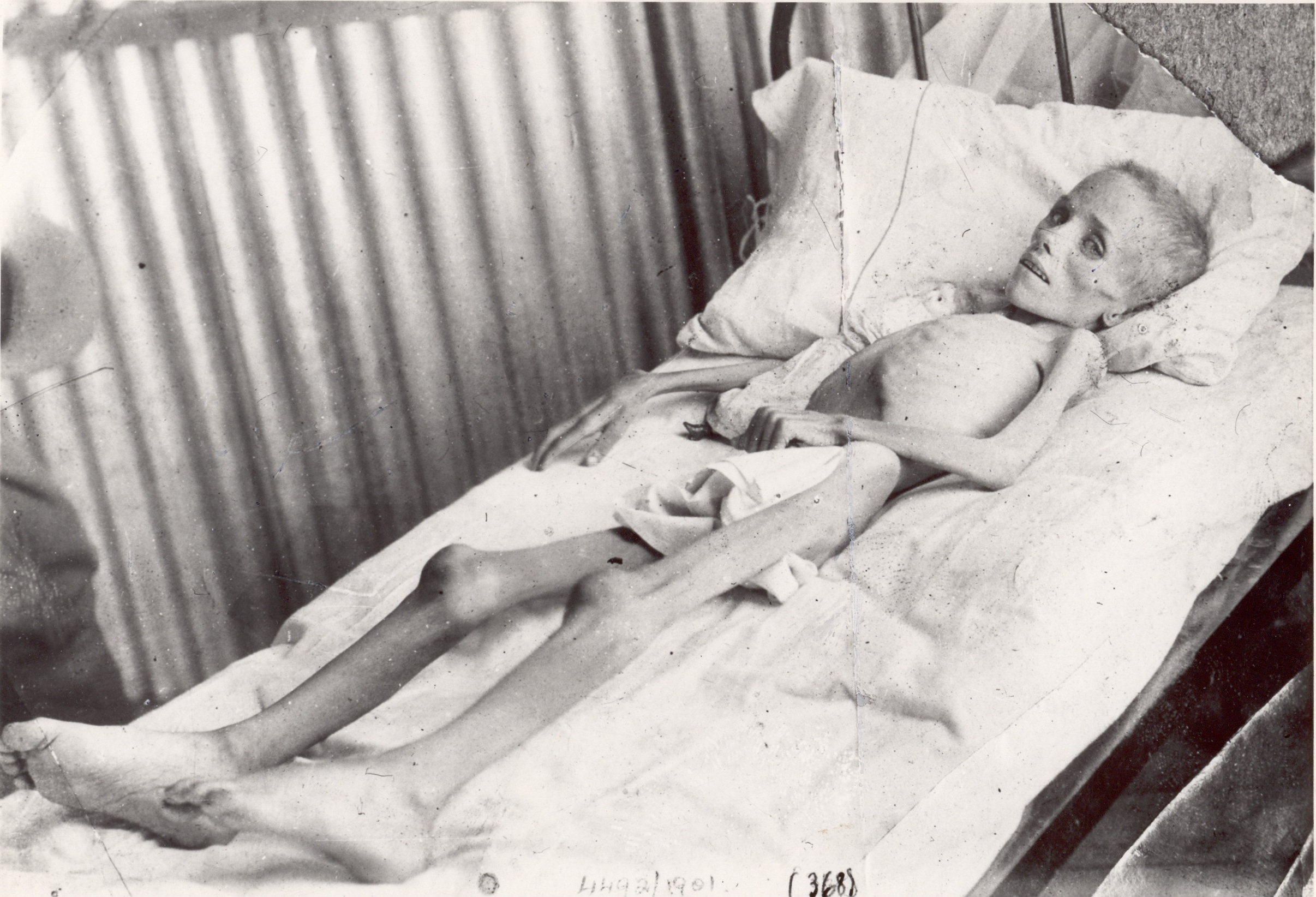
Lizzie van Zyl, shortly before her death in Bloemfontein Concentration Camp

The term concentration camp was first used by the British military during the Boer War (1899–1902). Facing attack by Boer guerrillas, British forces rounded up the Boer women and children as well as black people living on Boer land, and sent them to 34 tented camps scattered around South Africa. Altogether, 116,572 Boers were interned, roughly a quarter of the population. This was done as part of a scorched earth policy to deny the Boer guerrillas access to the supplies of food and clothing they needed to continue the war.

One such camp was situated at East London, South Africa. Though they were not extermination camps, the women and children of Boer men who were still fighting were given smaller rations. The poor diet and inadequate hygiene led to contagious diseases such as measles, typhoid and dysentery. Coupled with a shortage of medical facilities, this led to large numbers of deaths—a report after the war concluded that 27,927 Boer (of whom 22,074 were children under 16) and 14,154 black Africans had died of starvation, disease and exposure in the camps.

In contrast to these figures, during the war the British, Colonial and South African forces' casualties included 5,774 killed in action and 13,250 deaths from disease, while the Boers' casualties in the Transvaal and Orange Free State up to December 1901, included 2640 killed in action and 945 deaths from disease.

During World War I, South African troops invaded neighboring German South-West Africa. German settlers were rounded up and sent to concentration camps in Pretoria and later in Pietermaritzburg.

=== Soviet Russia ===
During its 1918 invasion of Soviet Russia, the UK built two concentration camps: Mudyug island and Iukang on Ostrovnoy island.

=== Wales ===
During World War I, there was an internement camp in Frongoch, Merionethshire. First German POWs were held here until 1916, then 1,800 Irish political prisoners were held there following the Easter Rising, including Michael Collins. The prisoners were very poorly treated and Frongoch became a breeding ground for Irish revolutionaries.

== United States ==
=== Indigenous people ===
==== Cherokee ====
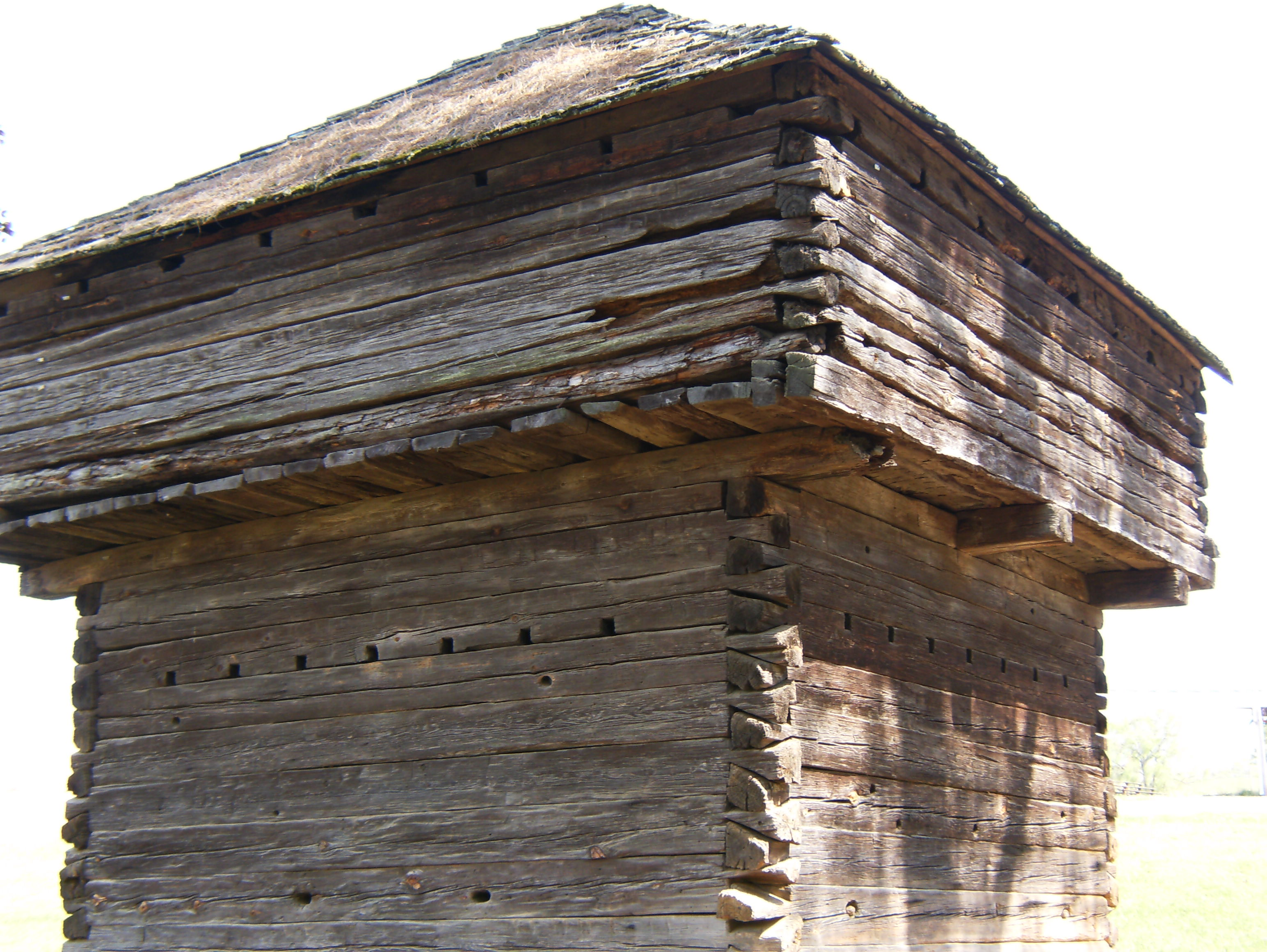
Fort Marr Benton, Tennessee, the last of American stockades used to intern the Cherokee during the months prior to the Trail of Tears

The first large-scale confinement of a specific ethnic group in detention centers began in the summer of 1838, when President Martin Van Buren ordered the U.S. Army to enforce the Treaty of New Echota (a Native American removal treaty) by rounding up the Cherokee into prison camps before relocating them. Called "emigration depots", the three main ones were located at Ross's Landing (Chattanooga, Tennessee), Fort Payne, Alabama, and Fort Cass (Charleston, Tennessee). Fort Cass was the largest, with over 4,800 Cherokee prisoners held over the summer of 1838. Many died in these camps due to disease, which spread rapidly because of the close quarters and bad sanitary conditions.

==== Nisqually (Washington) ====
In November 1855 an internment camp was set up on Fox Island in Puget Sound for non-combatant tribal members, following the killing of nine white settlers. The internees were faced with poor food and shelter, and lack of medical care. Of some 700 people held at the site, 80 died between May and September 1856. The main causes of death were respiratory conditions such as tuberculosis.

==== Dakota ====
The United States – Dakota Indian War of 1862 resulted in the loss of life, fear, suffering and hardship for early Minnesotan citizens while disproportionately harming the Dakota and other indigenous people who found themselves on either side of the conflict, much like the concurrent Civil War. Minnesota Governor Alexander Ramsey decreed on 9 September 1862 that "the Sioux Indians of Minnesota must be exterminated or driven forever beyond the borders of the state" leading to the forced removal and banishment of the indigenous people who would surrender and to the government-sanctioned bounties that would be awarded for the scalps of any fleeing or resisting indigenous person.

On 26 December 1862 thirty eight Dakota warriors, including We-Chank-Wash-ta-don-pee (often called Chaska), who was pardoned, were hanged with the label of murderers and rapists of civilians rather than 'war criminals' in the largest mass execution in United States history at the order of President Abraham Lincoln, with the remaining 361 prisoners being sent to segregated prison camps in other states just days before the Emancipation Proclamation was issued.

During the winter of 1862-63 more than 1600 Dakota non-combatants, including women, children and the elderly, as well as "mixed-blood" families and Christian and farmer Dakota who had opposed the war, were force-marched to a fenced concentration camp near the base of Fort Snelling, which was built on the Dakota sacred area of Bdóte, at the meeting point of the Minnesota River and the Mississippi River. Living conditions and sanitation were poor, and infectious diseases such as measles struck the camp, killing between an estimated 102 and 300 Dakota. Here the women were separated from the men before being exiled to reservations in neighboring states and Canada. These reservations tended to disregard Native American culture and traditions and their children were placed in boarding schools, which focused on European-based culture and religions.

==== Navajo ====
By 1862, the scorched earth tactics employed by General James Henry Carleton and his subordinate, Colonel Kit Carson against the Navajo had pushed many to the brink of starvation. Carleton then ordered some 10,000 Navajo on a 300 mi (480 km) forced march known as the Long Walk of 1864, from their homeland in the Four Corners region, to the area of Bosque Redondo in the New Mexico Territory, where they remained interned for the next four years. Conditions in the camp proved deplorable, and many died from starvation and disease, until by December 1865, their numbers had been reduced to around 6,000. The Navajo were allowed to return home in 1868, with the signing of the Treaty of Bosque Redondo, after negotiations with William Tecumseh Sherman and Samuel F. Tappan of the Indian Peace Commission.

=== Philippines ===
On 7 December 1901, during the Philippine–American War, General J. Franklin Bell began a concentration camp policy in Batangas —everything outside the "dead lines" was systematically destroyed: humans, crops, domestic animals, houses, and boats. A similar policy had been quietly initiated on the island of Marinduque some months before.

=== World War I (United States) ===
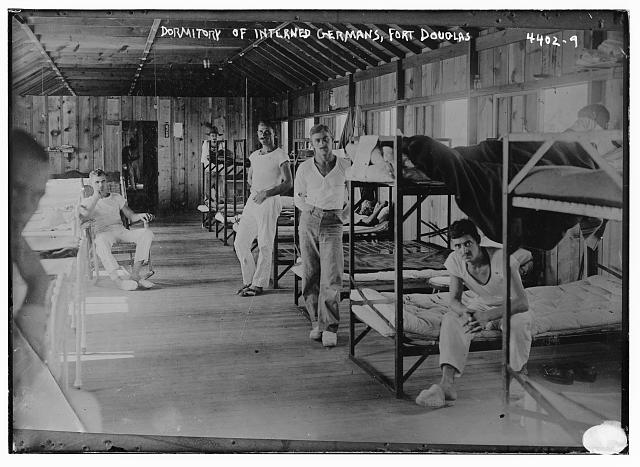
Several Germans in an internment camp at Fort Douglas during World War I

At the height of the First World War, many of German descent became the target of two regulations passed by President Woodrow Wilson. Two of the four main World War I-era internment camps were located in Hot Springs, N.C., and Fort Oglethorpe, Georgia. Attorney General A. Mitchell Palmer wrote that "All aliens interned by the government are regarded as enemies, and their property is treated accordingly."

=== World War II (United States) ===
In reaction to the bombing of Pearl Harbor by Japan in 1941, United States President Franklin D. Roosevelt issued Executive Order 9066 on 19 February 1942, which allowed military commanders to designate areas "from which any or all persons may be excluded." Under this order all Japanese and Americans of Japanese ancestry were removed from Western coastal regions to concentration camps in Arkansas, California, Oregon, Washington, Wyoming, Colorado, Arizona, Utah, and Idaho; German and Italian citizens, permanent residents, and American citizens of those respective ancestries (and American citizen family members) were removed from (among other places) the West and East Coast and relocated or interned, and roughly one-third of the US was declared an exclusionary zone.

The Fort Lincoln, North Dakota internment camp opened in April 1941 and closed in 1945. It had a peak population of 650. In 2014 it housed the United Tribes Technical College. Some CCC barracks and two brick army barracks were fenced and used to house the internees. The first internees were Italian and German seamen. 800 Italians arrived, but they were soon sent to Fort Missoula in Montana. The first Japanese American Issei arrived in 1942, but they were also transferred to other camps. The Germans were the only internees left at the camp until February 1945, when 650 more Japanese Americans were brought in. These Japanese Americans had previously renounced their U.S. citizenship and were left waiting to be deported to Japan. The brick buildings remain, but others are gone. A newspaper article from The Bismarck Tribune, 2 March 1946, stated that 200 Japanese were still being held at Fort Lincoln.

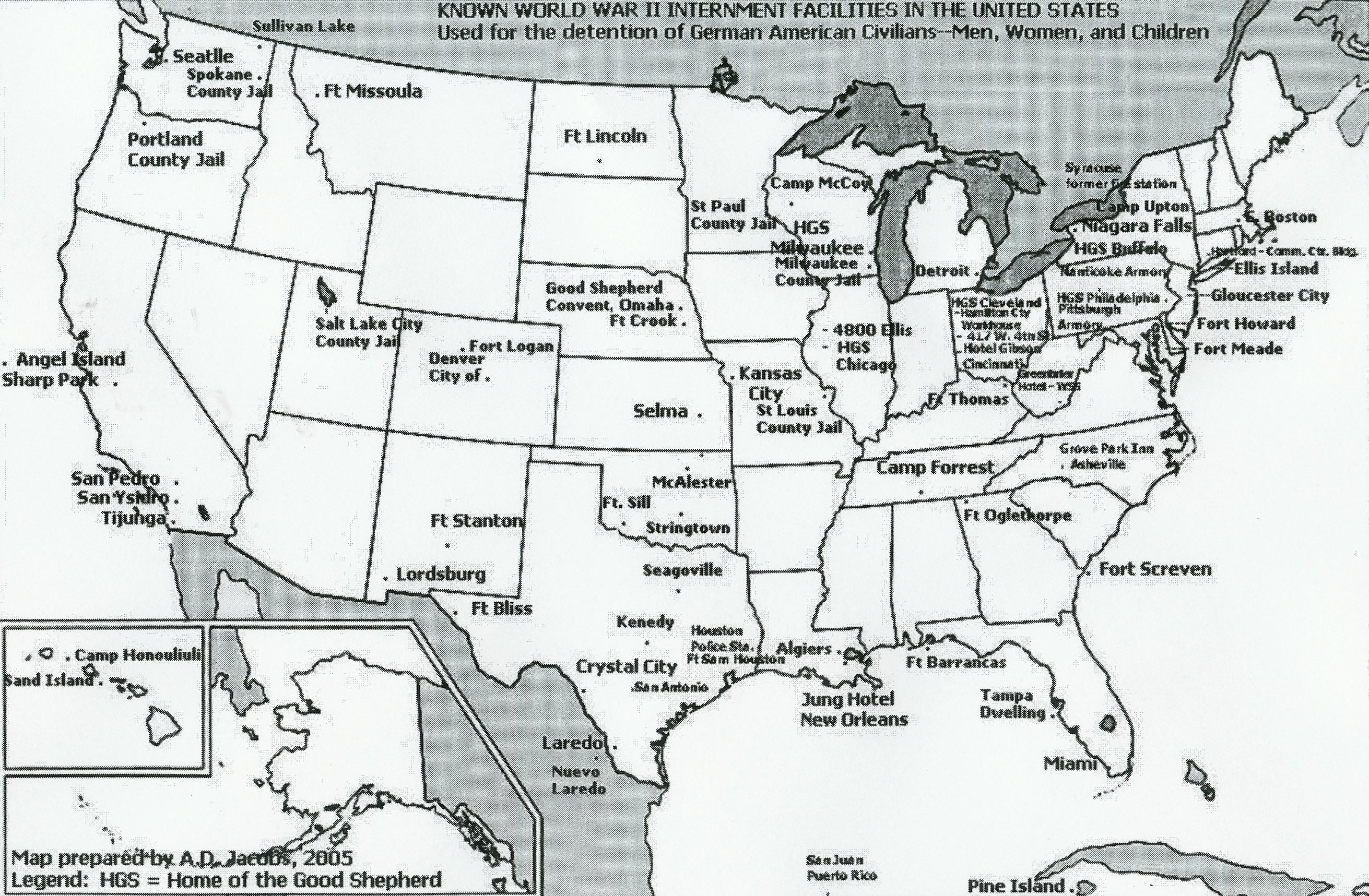
The locations of internment camps for German-Americans during World War II

Oklahoma housed German and Italian POW's at Fort Reno, located near El Reno, and Camp Gruber, near Braggs, Oklahoma.

Almost 120,000 Japanese Americans and resident Japanese aliens would eventually be removed from their homes and relocated.

About 2,200 Japanese living in South America (mostly in Peru) were transported to the United States and placed in internment camps.

Approximately 5,000 Germans living in several Latin American republics were also removed and transported to the United States and placed in internment camps. In addition, at least 10,905 German Americans were held in more than 50 internment sites throughout the United States and Hawaii.

Aleut peoples living on the Aleutian Islands were also interned during the war. Funter Bay was one such camp. Restitution was paid by the US government in 1987 and 1993.

=== Political dissidents ===
Per the Emergency Detention Act (Title II of the McCarran Internal Security Act of 1950), six concentration camps were constructed in 1952 with the expectation that they would need to be used to detain political dissidents in the event that the U.S. government was forced to declare a state of emergency. They were originally intended to hold alleged communists, anti-war activists, civil rights 'militants,' and other dissidents. They were maintained from the 1950s to the 1960s, but they were never used for their intended purpose.

=== Afghan War and the occupation of Iraq ===
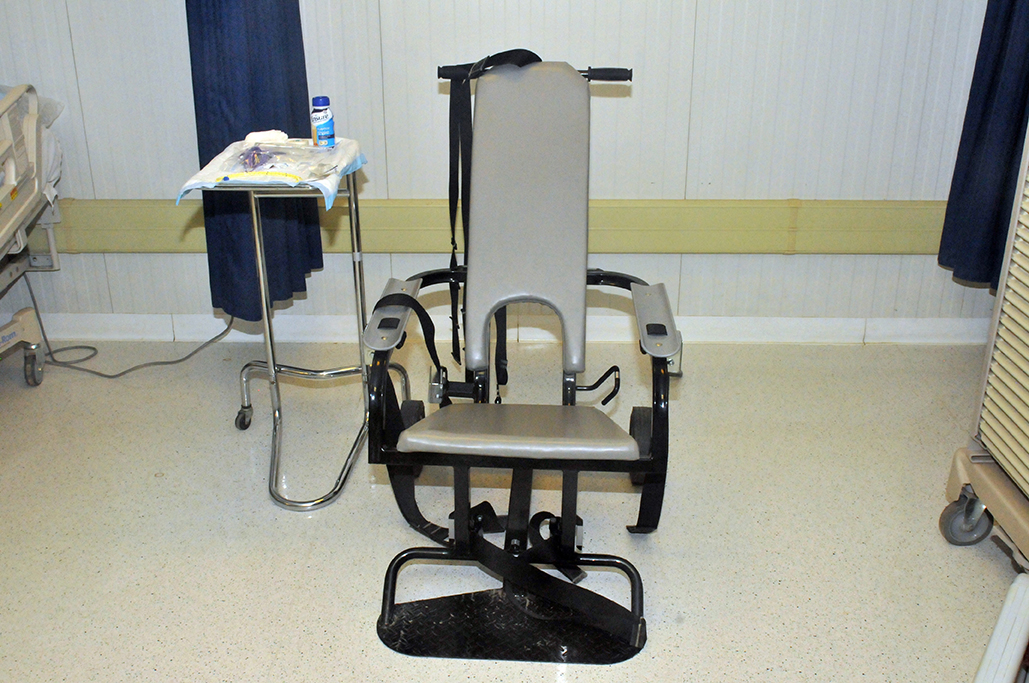
Guantánamo force-feeding restraint chair

In 2002, the United States opened the Guantanamo Bay detention camp in Cuba and the Parwan Detention Facility in Afghanistan. Both facilities were established in order to detain people captured during the Afghan War. In 2003, in order to detain people captured during the Occupation of Iraq, the United States transformed the Abu Ghraib prison into an internment and detention camp. Guantanamo Bay has been called an "Internment Camp" by The Intercept and a "Concentration Camp" by the Los Angeles Times.

Due to the American government's policy of holding detainees indefinitely, a number of captives have been held for extended periods without being legally charged, including Ayman Saeed Abdullah Batarfi who was captured in 2001 and released from the Guantanamo Bay Detention Camp in 2009. A document leaked from the International Committee of the Red Cross was published by The New York Times in November 2004, which accused the U.S. military of cruelty "tantamount to torture" against detainees held at the Guantanamo Bay facility. In May 2005, the human rights group Amnesty International referred to the Guantanamo Bay Detention Camp as "the Gulag of our times."

In September 2006, after a series of abuses including the rape and murder of prisoners was reported to the public, control of the Abu Ghraib prison was transferred to the Iraqis. Subsequent investigative reports suggest that the United States continued to directly influence and oversee a campaign of torture carried out inside Iraqi facilities even after the handover of Iraq and related facilities was finalized. In March 2013 it was revealed that American officials, under pressure from Afghan officials, reached an agreement after more than a year of negotiations to hand over control of Bagram Theater Internment Facility to the Afghan government. In the deal, Bagram Theater Internment Facility, called "the other Guantanamo," "Guantanamo's evil twin" or "Obama's Gitmo" by human rights groups after reports of systematic abuse, was renamed the Afghan National Detention Facility at Parwan. Additionally, the agreement extended authority for American officials to have say over which detainees could be released from the facility, containing guarantees from the Afghan government that certain detainees would not be released regardless of whether or not they could be tried for circumstances related to their individual detentions. The Afghans formally took over control of other day-to-day operations. Guantanamo Bay Detention Camp remains open and fully operated by Americans.

=== Migrants on the Mexico–United States border ===
In 2018, Donald Trump instituted a "zero tolerance" policy which mandated the criminal prosecution of all adults who were accused of violating immigration laws by immigration authorities. This policy directly led to the large-scale, forcible separation of children and parents arriving at the United States-Mexico border, including those who were seeking asylum from violence in their home countries, by building up former civilian detainment camp infrastructure from the past administrations. Parents were arrested and put into criminal detention, while their children were taken away, classified as unaccompanied alien minors, to be put into child immigrant detention centers.

Although Trump signed an executive order which ostensibly ended the family separation component of his administration's migrant detentions in June 2018, it continued under alternative justifications into 2019.

By the end of 2018, the number of children being held had swelled to a high of nearly 15,000, which by August 2019 had been reduced to less than 9,000. In 2019, many experts, including Andrea Pitzer, the author of One Long Night: A Global History of Concentration Camps, have acknowledged the designation of the detention centers as "concentration camps" particularly given that the centers, previously cited by Texas officials for more than 150 health violations and reported deaths in custody, reflect a record typical of the history of deliberate substandard healthcare and nutrition in concentration camps.

This family separation policy and the detention facilities again came under scrutiny following a 2021 surge in migrant arrivals.

In late June 2025, Governor Ron DeSantis of Florida began construction of the South Florida Detention Facility on a 39-square-mile (100 km^{2}) parcel in the Florida Everglades, which opened on July 1, 2025. The first group of immigrant detainees arrived on July 3, 2025, beginning the facility's operations. Some detainees have reported harsh conditions at the facility, citing limited access to water, insufficient food, and restrictions on the practice of their religion. Critics of the facility have described it as a concentration camp and have referred to it as "Alligator Auschwitz."

While some organizations have refused to label these facilities "concentration camps", an open letter addressed to the United States Holocaust Memorial Museum by hundreds of Holocaust and genocide scholars objected to this refusal.

== South and North Vietnam ==
In South Vietnam, the government of Ngo Dinh Diem countered North Vietnamese subversion (including the assassination of over 450 South Vietnamese officials in 1956) by detaining tens of thousands of suspected communists in "political re-education centers." This was a ruthless program that resulted in the incarceration of many non-communists, even though it also resulted in the successful curtailment of communist activity in the country, if only for a time. The North Vietnamese government claimed that over 65,000 individuals were incarcerated and 2,148 individuals were killed in the process by November 1957, but these estimates may be exaggerated.

The Strategic Hamlet Program was a plan to stop the spread of Communism which was implemented between 1961 and 1963 by the government of South Vietnam and US military advisors, the Strategic Hamlet Program was implemented during the Vietnam War. In an attempt to isolate the communists by preventing them from influencing the rural South Vietnamese population, the South Vietnamese government and US military advisors constructed thousands of new, tightly controlled protected villages or "strategic hamlets". In some cases, people voluntarily moved into these settlements, but in most cases, people were forcibly relocated, and as a result, these settlements have been described as internment camps. The rural peasants would be provided with protection, economic support, and aid by the government, thereby strengthening their relationship with the South Vietnamese government (GVN). It was hoped that this program would convince the peasants to become increasingly loyal to the South Vietnamese government, however, the Strategic Hamlet Program was a failure, it alienated many and after it was canceled, the Viet Cong's influence increased and rural peasants moved back to their old homes or they moved to larger cities.

In the years which followed the North Vietnamese conquest of South Vietnam, up to 300,000 South Vietnamese were sent to re-education camps, where many of them were forced to perform hard labor, tortured, starved, and exposed to diseases.

== Yugoslavia ==
=== Nazi camps ===
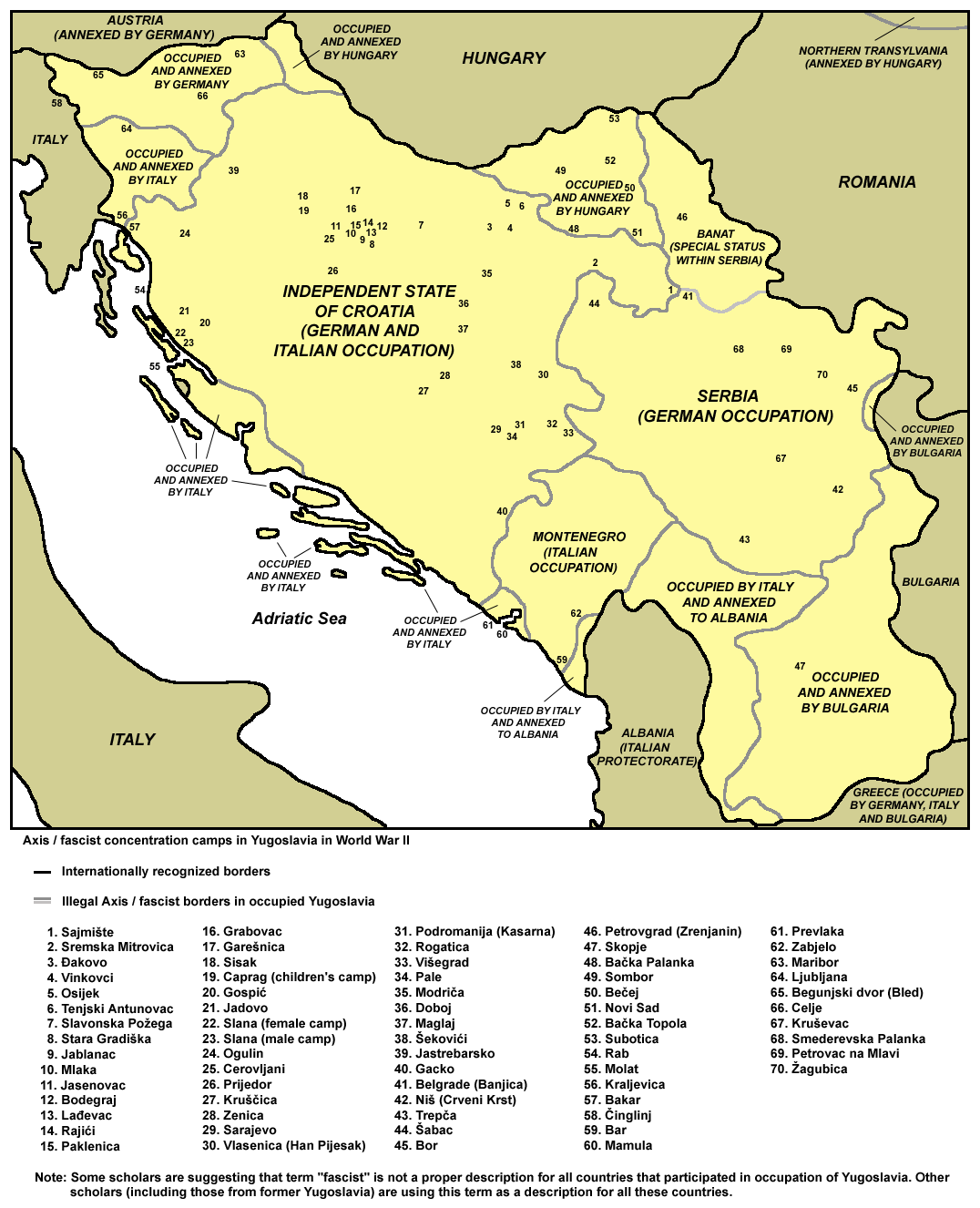
Nazi concentration camps in Yugoslavia.

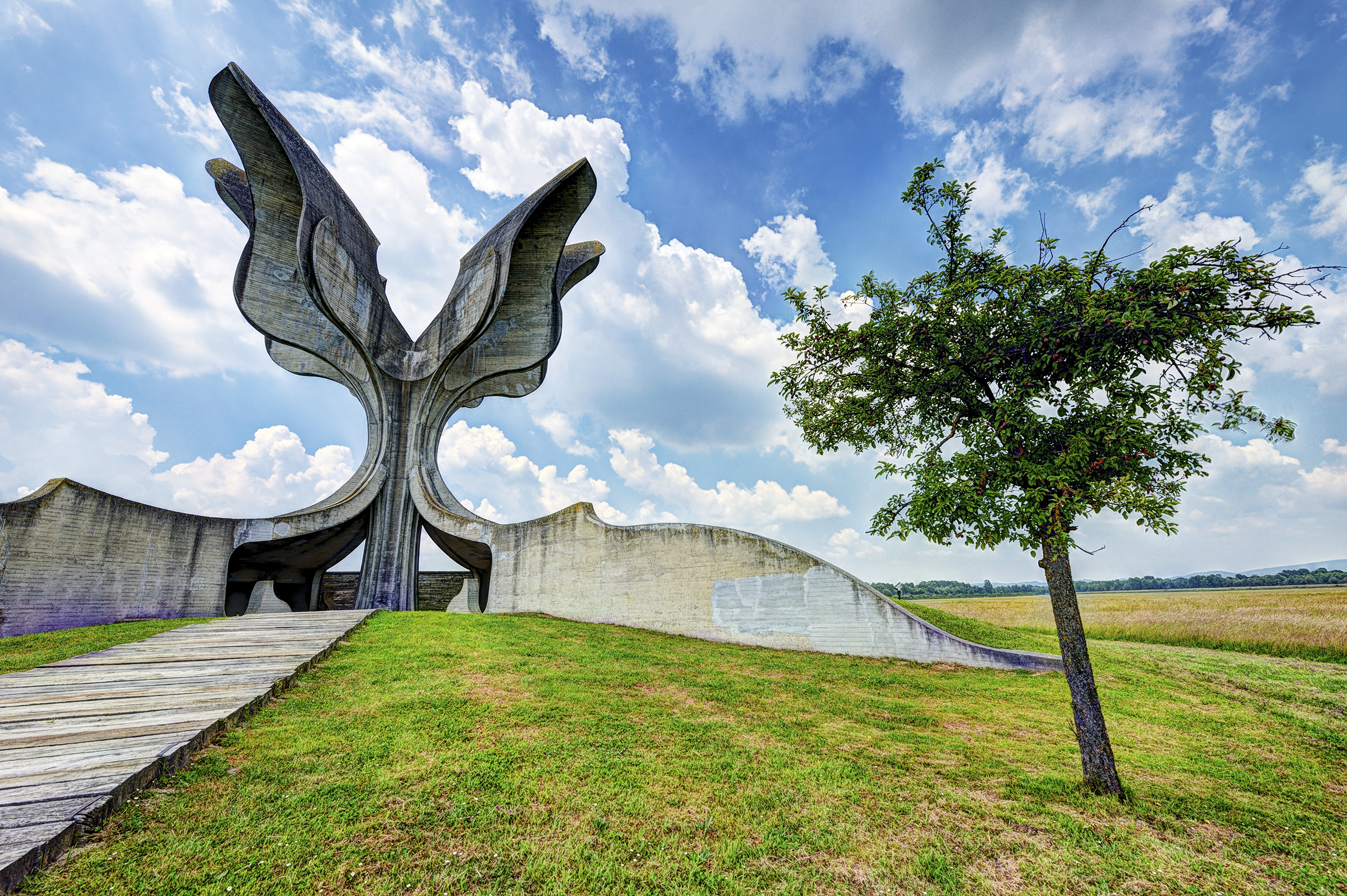
Jasenovac monument by Bogdan Bogdanović.

During the Axis occupation of Yugoslavia (1941–1944), as many as 70 Nazi concentration camps were formed in Yugoslavia. The main victims in these camps were ethnic Serbs, Jews and Roma. It is estimated that between 1 million and 1.7 million people perished as victims of the Nazi occupation of Yugoslavia.

List of the camps

- Sajmište
- Sremska Mitrovica
- Đakovo
- Vinkovci
- Osijek
- Tenjski Antunovac
- Slavonska Požega
- Stara Gradiška
- Jablanac
- Mlaka
- Jasenovac
- Bodegraj
- Lađevac
- Rajići
- Paklenica
- Grabovac
- Garešnica
- Sisak
- Caprag (camp for children)
- Gospić
- Jadovo
- Slana (camp for women)
- Slana (camp for men)
- Ogulin
- Cerovljani
- Prijedor
- Kruščica
- Zenica
- Sarajevo
- Vlasenica – Han Pijesak
- Podromanija – Kasarna
- Rogatica
- Višegrad
- Pale
- Modriča
- Doboj
- Maglaj
- Šekovići
- Jastrebarsko
- Gacko
- Belgrade – Banjica
- Niš – Crveni Krst
- Trepča
- Šabac
- Bor
- Petrovgrad (Zrenjanin)
- Skopje
- Bačka Palanka
- Sombor
- Bečej
- Novi Sad
- Bačka Topola
- Subotica
- Rab
- Molat
- Kraljevica
- Bakar
- Činglinj
- Bar
- Mamula
- Prevlaka
- Zabjelo
- Maribor
- Ljubljana
- Begunjski Dvor – Bled
- Celje
- Kruševac
- Smederevska Palanka
- Petrovac na Mlavi
- Žagubica

=== Communist camps ===
In 1931, 499,969 citizens of Yugoslavia listed their native language as German and they comprised 3.6% of population of the country. In 1944, an unknown and disputed number of the Danube Swabians left the country, together with the defeated German army. As a result of the decisions of the Anti-fascist Council of national liberation of Yugoslavia ("Antifašističko veće narodnog oslobođenja Jugoslavije" – AVNOJ) in Jajce on 21 November 1943 and on 21 November 1944 in Belgrade all legal rights and citizenship were collectively canceled for about 168,000 civilian members of the Danube Swabian minority who remained in Yugoslavia (mostly in the Bačka and Banat regions) after military defeat of the German army. Furthermore, they were fully dispossessed of all property. About 7,000 German-speaking citizens were killed by the local Yugoslav partisans in the autumn of 1944. Most of the other Danube Swabian civilians were interned and driven into numerous labor camps and at least eight additional prison camps were built for those who were unable to work: the old, the sick, and children under the age of 14 and mothers with small children under the age of 2 or 3.

These camps for the sick, the elderly, children, and those who were unable to work were:

In the Bačka:

- Bački Jarak with 7,000 deaths
- Gakovo with 8,500 deaths
- Kruševlje with 3,000 to 3,500 deaths

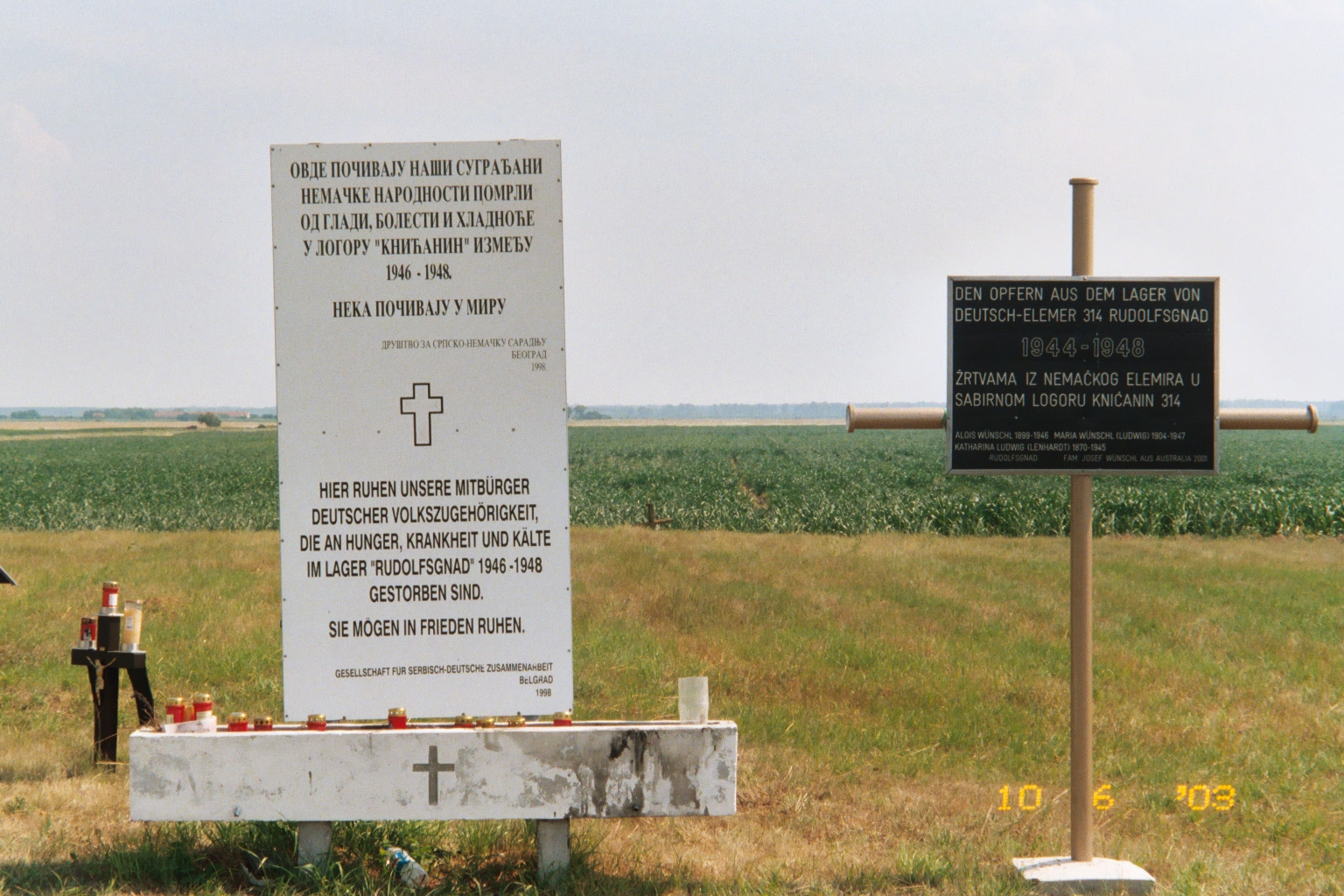
Memorial on the edge of the mass grave of Knićanin, the monument was built by members of the "society for German Serbian cooperation".

In the Banat:

- Molin with 3,000 deaths
- Knićanin with 11,000 deaths

In Syrmia:

- "Svilara", silk factory in Sremska Mitrovica with 2,000 deaths

In Slavonia:

- Valpovo with 1,000 to 2,000 deaths
- Krndija with 500 to 1,500 deaths

Over a three-year period, 48,447 of the interned Danube Swabians died in the labor and prison camps from starvation, cold, and disease. Nearly 35,000 of them succeeded in crossing the escape routes from the camps into nearby Hungary and Romania. Beginning in the summer of 1946, thousands of orphaned children were forcibly taken from the camps and placed in children's homes. Over the next decade, most of them were returned to their families by the International Red Cross ICRC. Additionally, more than 8,000 women between the ages of 18 and 35 and over 4,000 men between the ages of 16 and 45 were deported from the Bačka and Banat regions of Yugoslavia to forced labor camps in the USSR from the end of 1944 through the beginning of 1945.

The camps were disbanded in 1948 and the Yugoslav government recognized the citizenship of the remaining Danube Swabians. In 1948, 57,180 Germans lived in Yugoslavia. In the following decades, most of them emigrated to Germany.

== See also ==
- Enemy alien
- Habeas corpus
- House arrest
- Reconcentration policy
