= Natural monuments of North Korea =

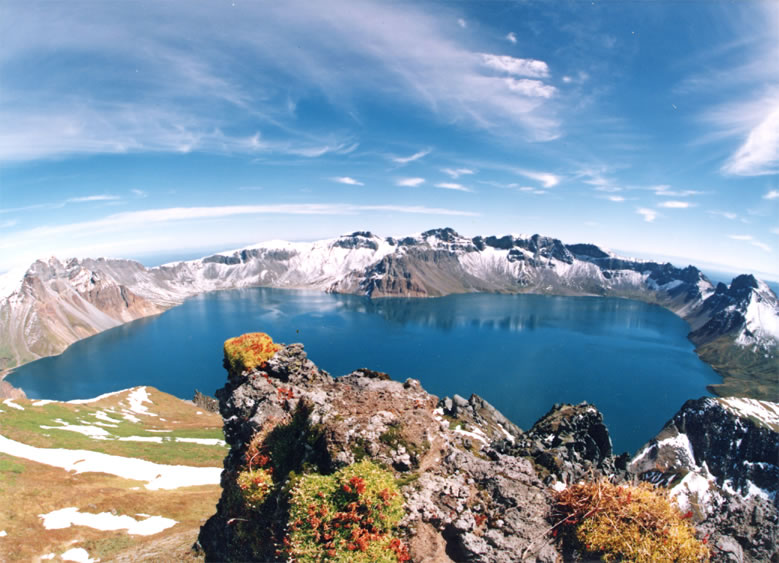
- Heaven Lake on Mt. Paektu

Korean name
- Hangul: 조선민주주의인민공화국 천연기념물
- Hanja: 朝鮮民主主義人民共和國天然記念物
- RR: Joseon minjujuui inmin gonghwaguk cheonyeonginyeommul
- MR: Chosŏn minjujuŭi inmin konghwaguk ch'ŏnyŏn'ginyŏmmul

Natural monuments of North Korea is a natural monuments system that designates natural resources that are designated as significant to the North Korean government. A total of 469 natural monument entries have been designated from no.1 to no. 935.

== History ==
North Korea first established a law made to protect natural heritage in 1946 April 29, but was abolished and was revised with new rules of administrating it in 1990.

== Designation standards ==
The designations are not only considered in an academic, aesthetic and economic perspective, but also designated based on whether it has significant revolutionary history regarding the ruling Kim family of North Korea. For plants it can be something the Kim family planted themselves, for geology it can be things that they named themselves, or important in terms of cult of personality, such as Mount Paektu and Samjiyon lake, for animals it can be things that were paid attention to by the Kim family.

== List ==
=== No. 1 - 50 ===
Missing numbers are simply numbers that are not designated with natural monuments.

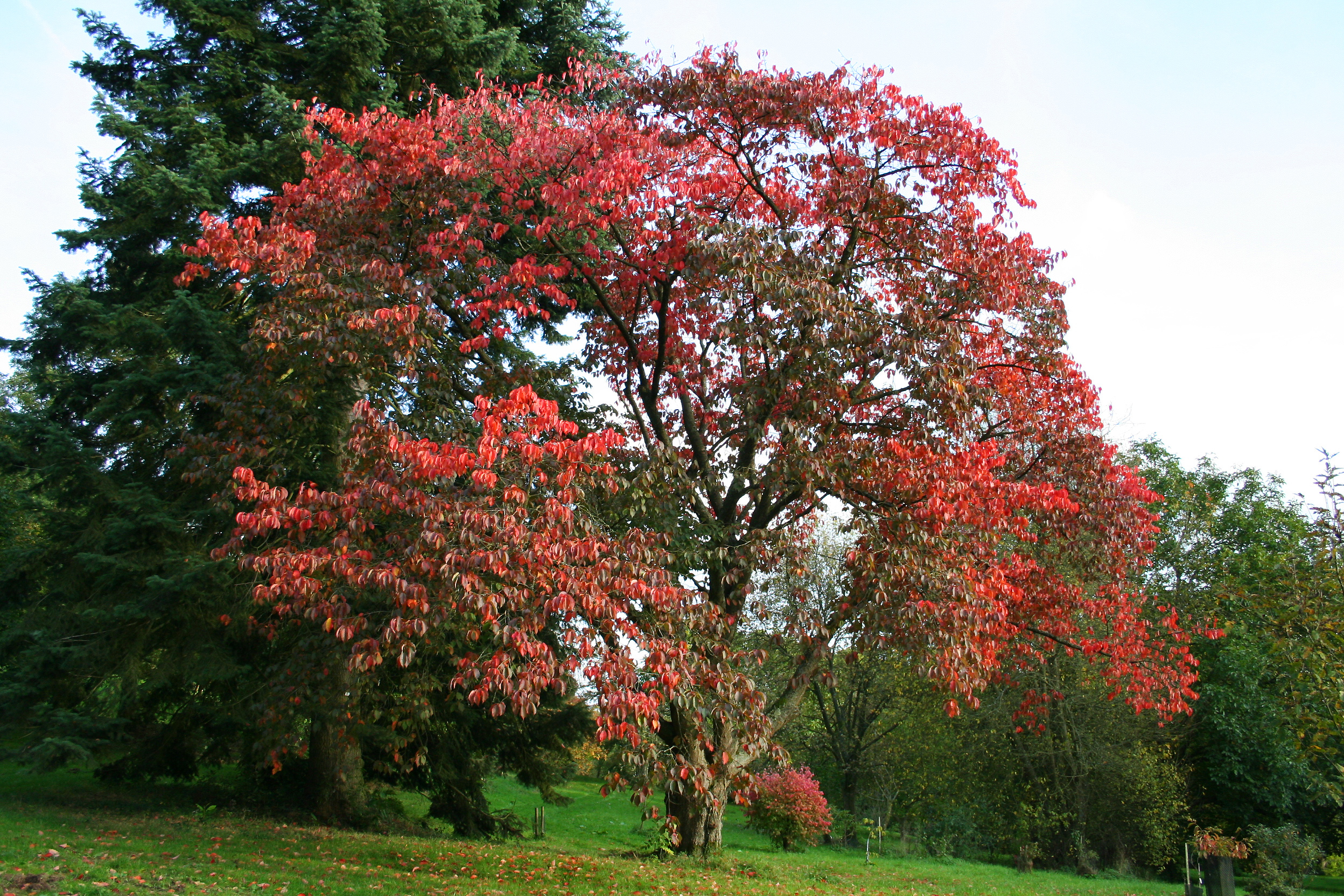
A Sargent cherry tree, Korean natural monument #1

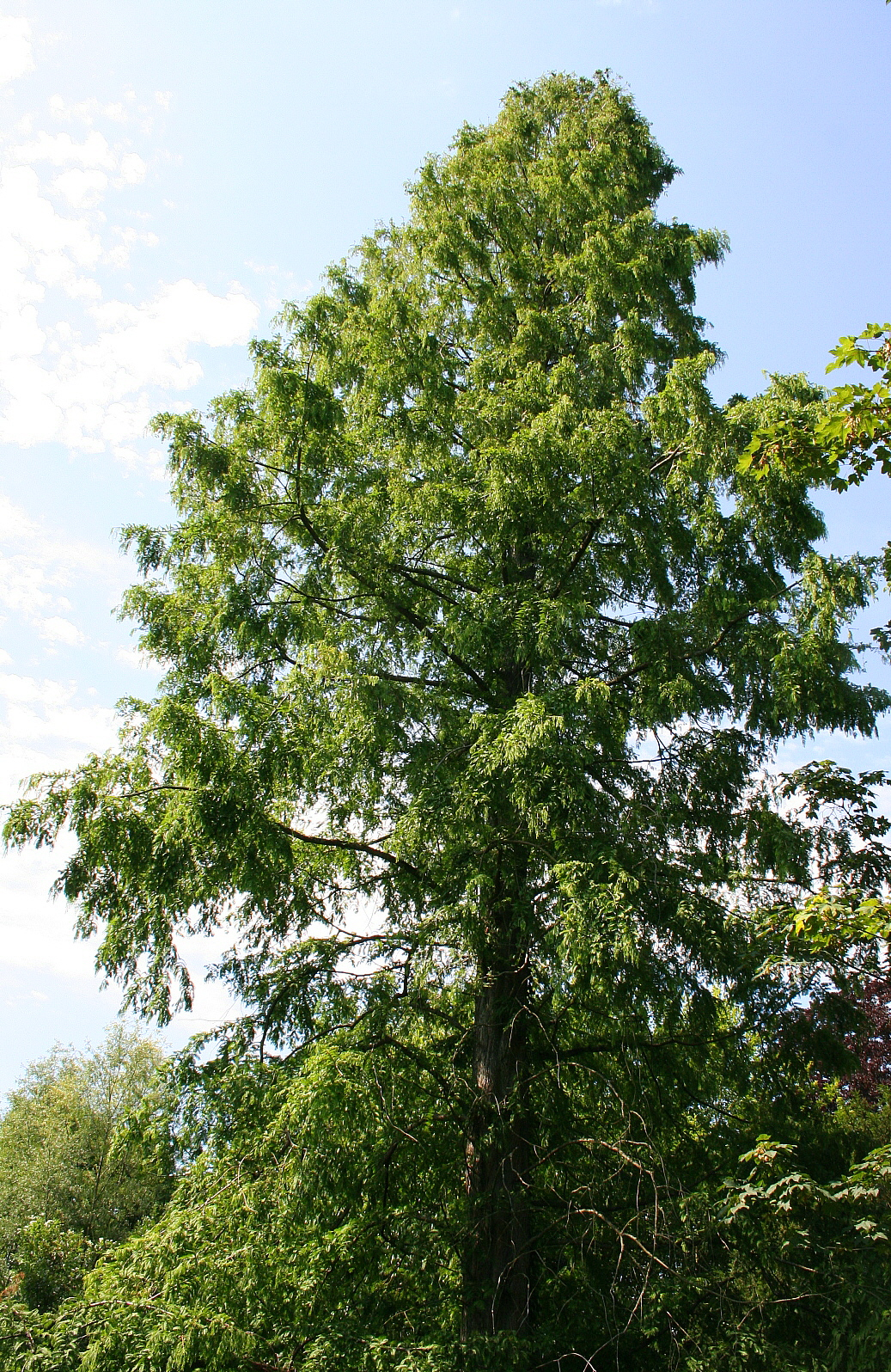
A Metasequoia tree, Korean natural monument #10

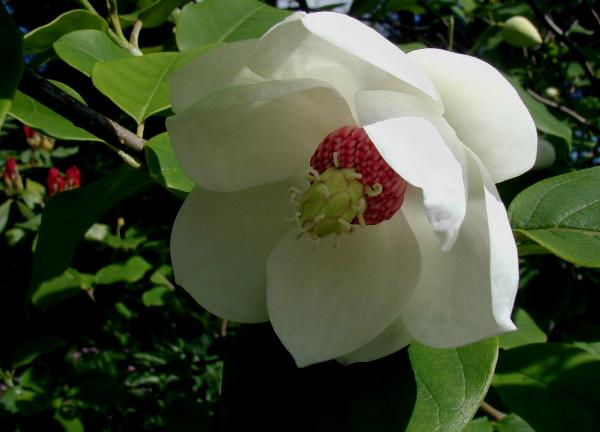
A Siebold's magnolia, Korean natural monument #11

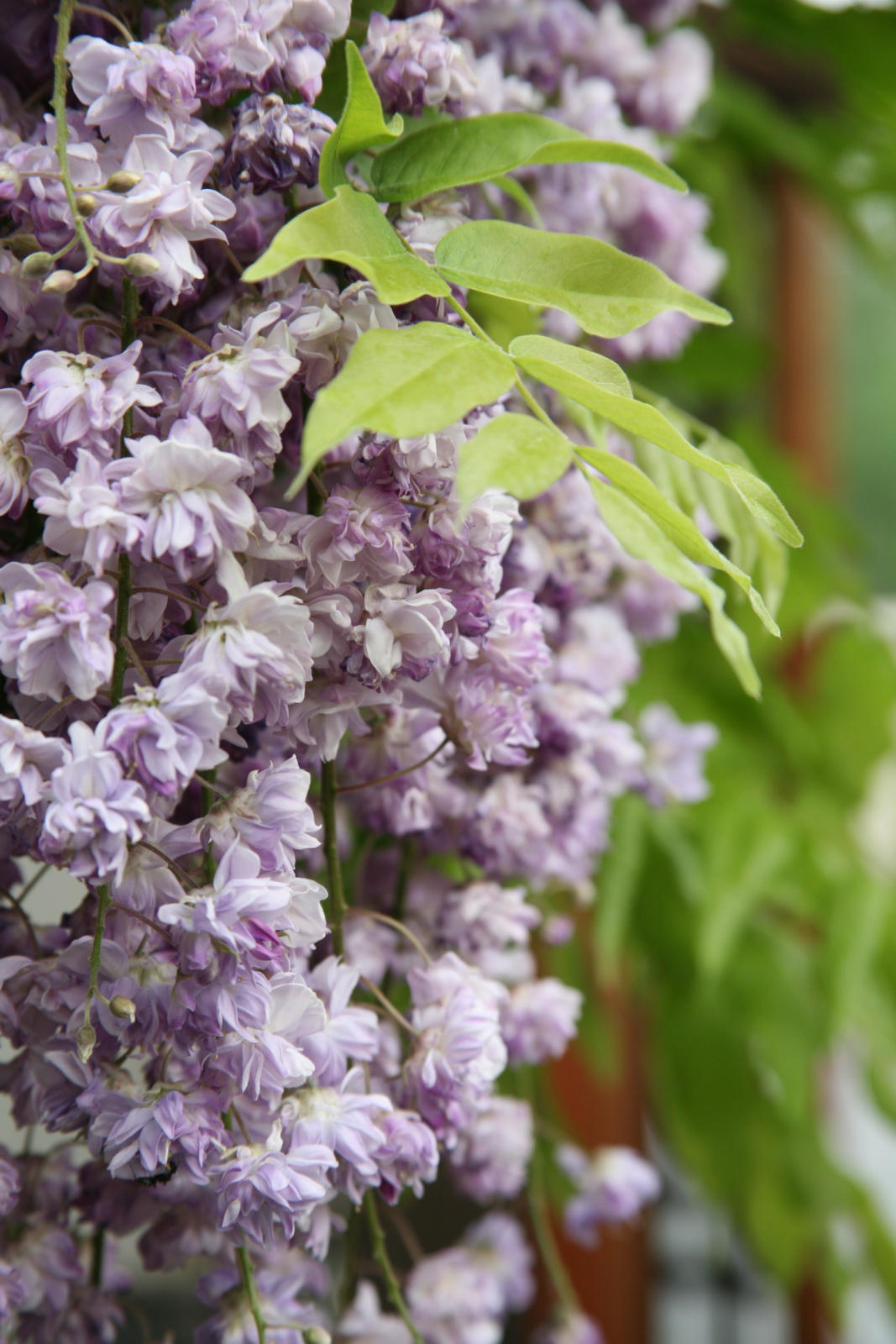
Japanese wisteria, Korean natural monument #15

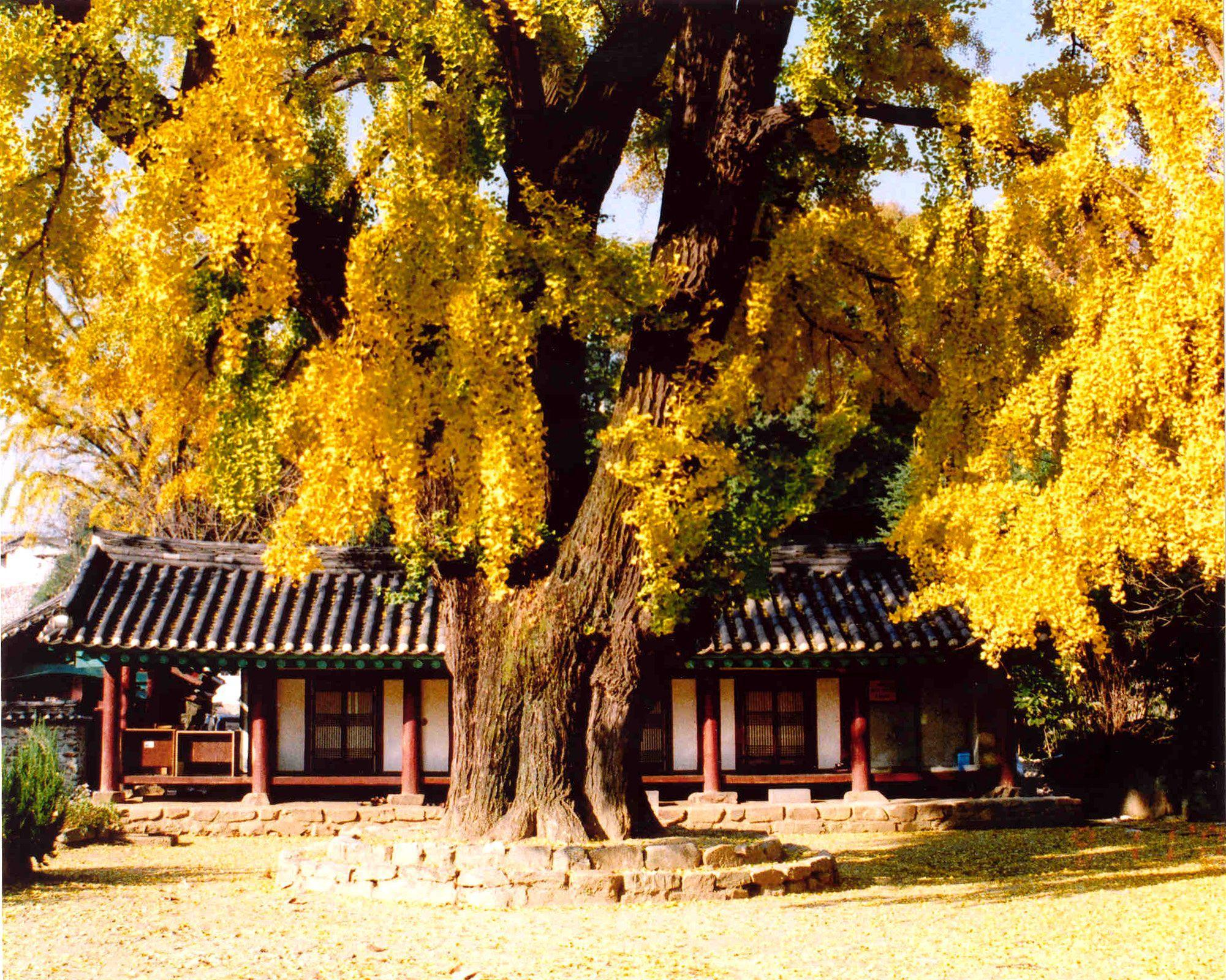
A ginkgo tree, Korean natural monument #33

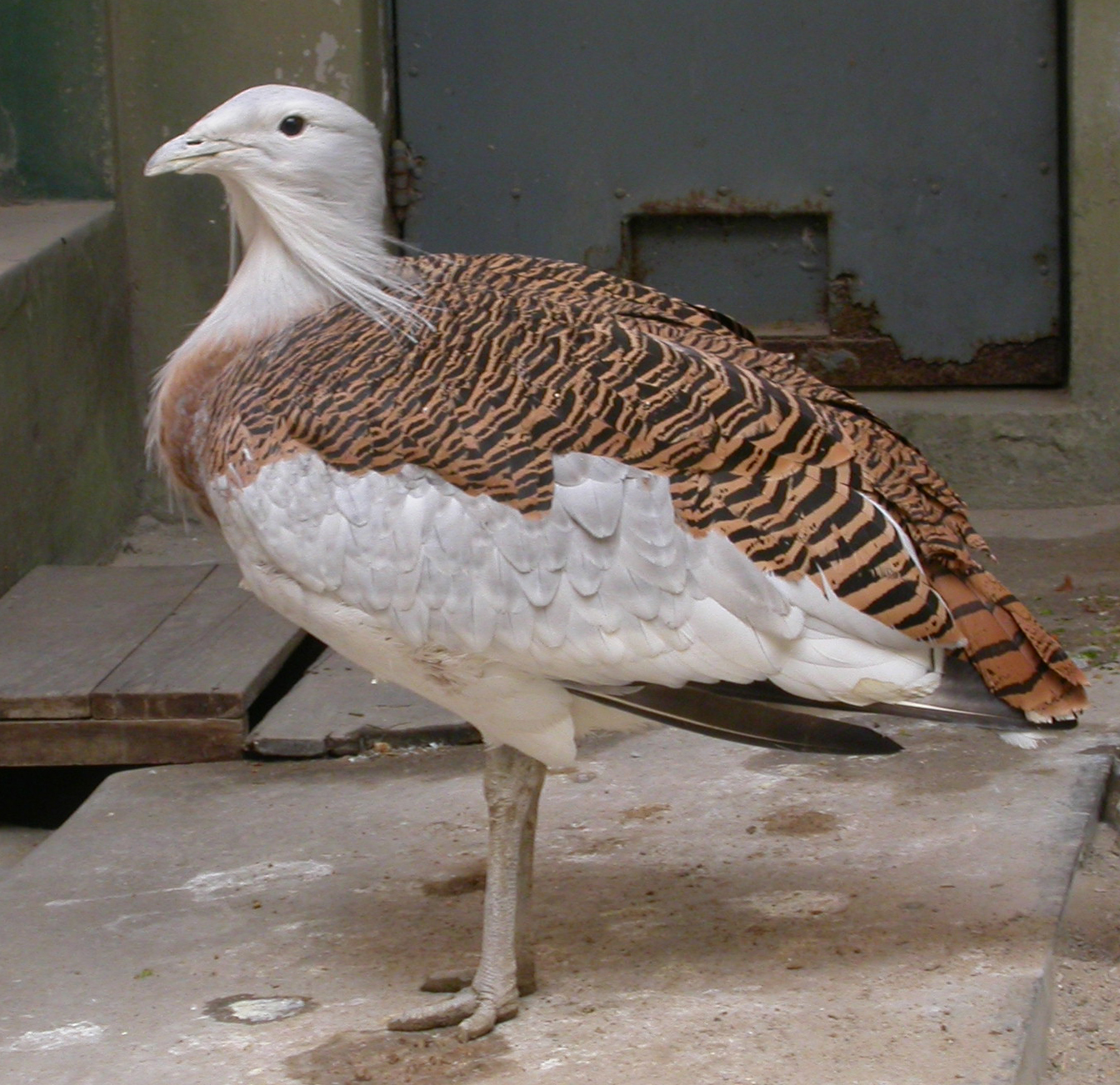
A great bustard, Korean natural monument #36

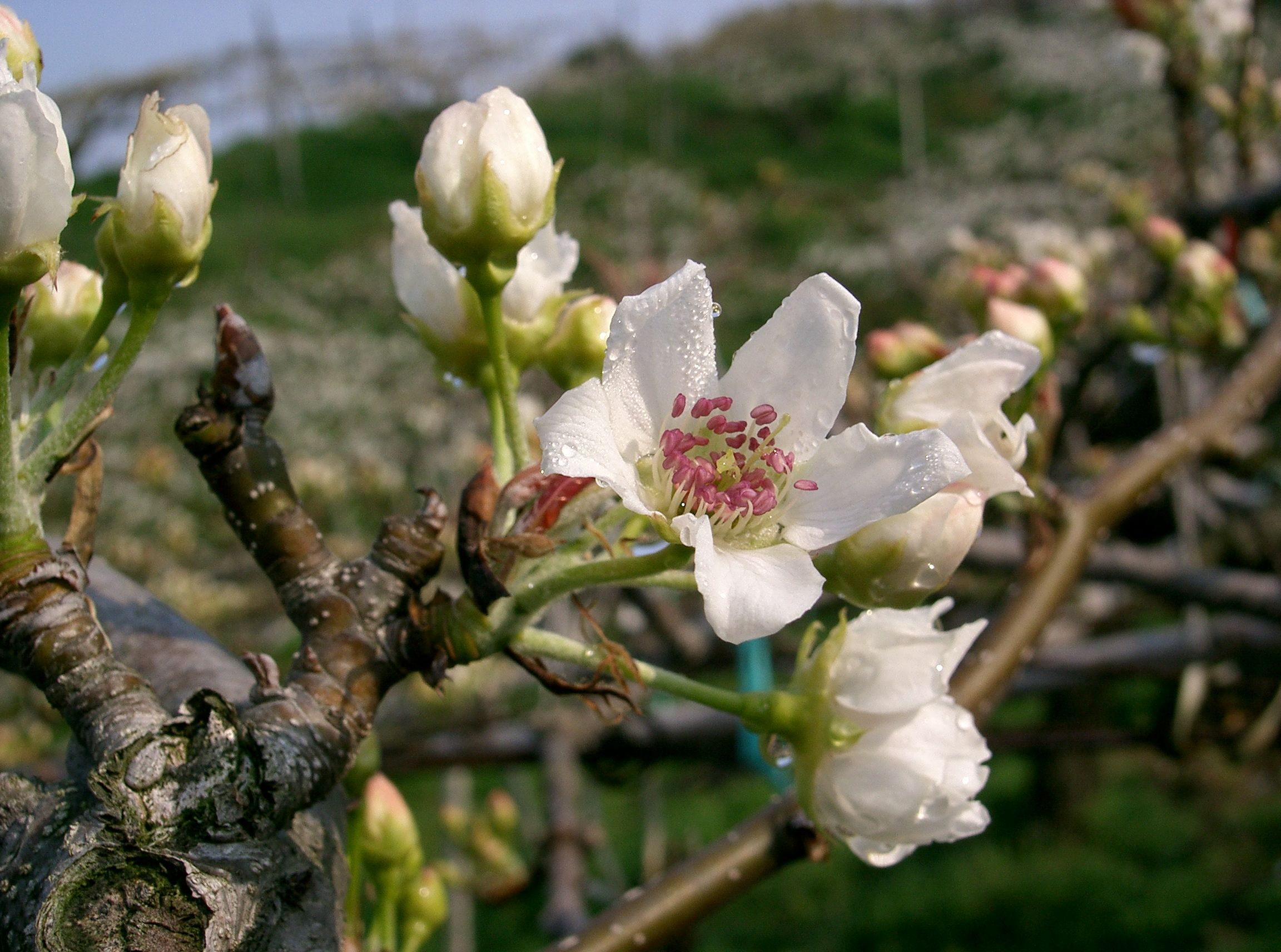
A Korean pear tree, Korean natural monument #42

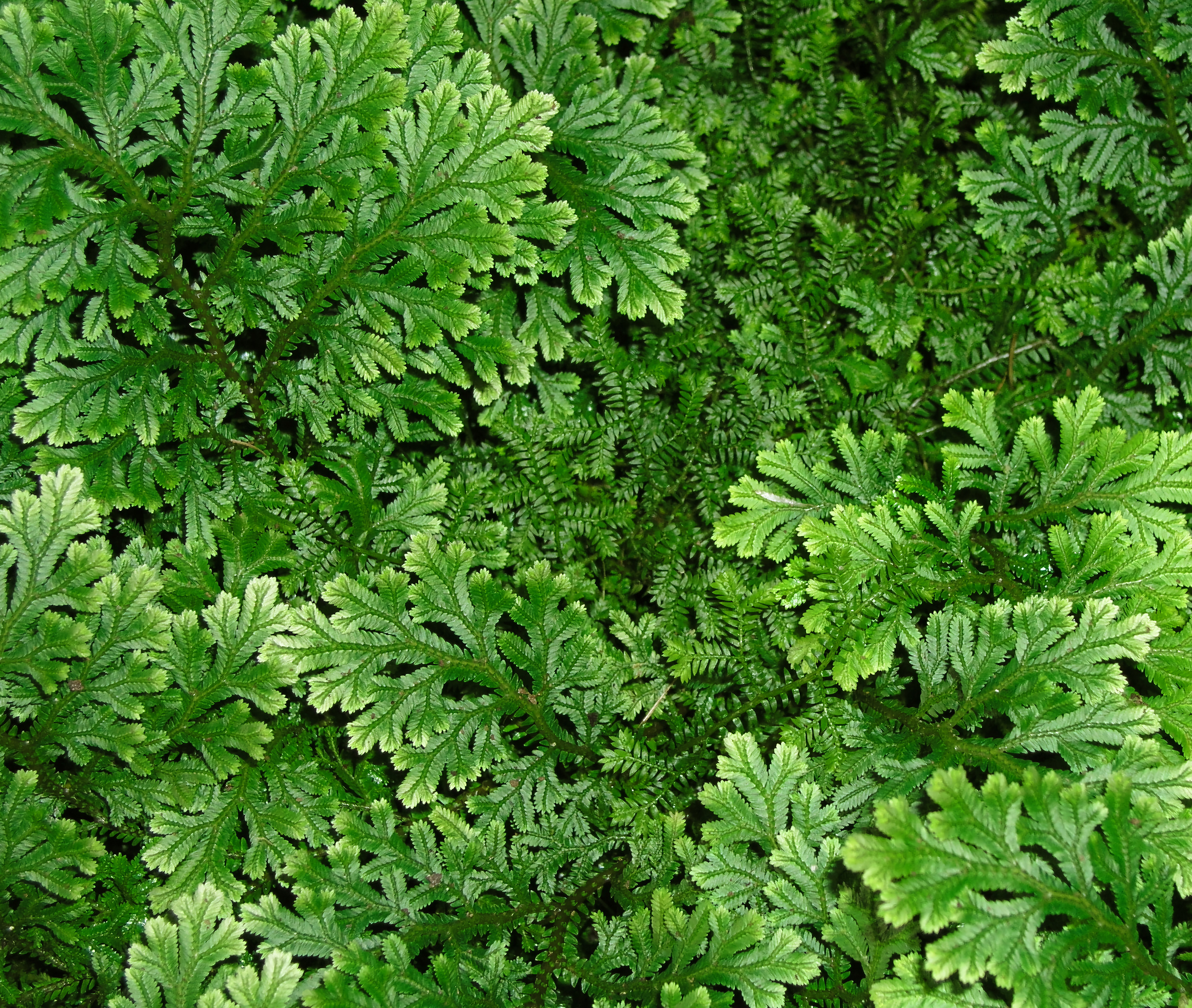
Spikemoss, Korean natural monument #46

	Name (Korean name)	Location	Description	Scientific name
1	Sargent cherry and Manchurian fir trees of Rŭngra-do island 릉라도 산벗나무와 전나무/綾羅島산벗나무와전나무	Rŭngra-do, Chung-guyŏk, Pyongyang	The place where wild cherry blossoms and fir trees in Rungrado grow is in Rungrado, Kyŏngsang-dong, Chung-guyok, Pyongyang. The trees are located next to the Rungrado Amusement Park Management Office. The soil where the Rungragdo fir tree grows is black because it is soil and sand piled up by the flow of the Daedong River. The sand layer is about 20 to 30 cm, and below it is a mixture of sand and gravel. The average root neck circumference of Rungrado wild cherry tree is 1.1m, chest height circumference 0.9m, treeshade diameter 7m, tree height 10m, and fir trees average root neck circumference 1.2m, chest height circumference 1.1m, treecap diameter 7.5m, tree height 7.5m. is about The stem of the wild cherry tree stands upright, the bark is smooth, and the color is ash or black. The leaves are alternately attached and have leaf stalks. Flowers bloom in light red around April. Fruits ripen black around June. Fir grows as a perpetual green-leaved tall tree. The bark is black ash, and the leaves are staggeredly attached to the branches. Flowers bloom at the tips of old branches in April–May, and fruits ripen in October.	Prunus sargentii/Abies holophylla
2	Korean weeping willows of Okryu 옥류능수버들/玉流능수버들	Moranbong Park, Pyongyang	The place where the Korean weeping willows of Okryu is Kyŏngsang-dong, Chung-guyok, Pyongyang. Weeping willows are beside the road going up from the bottom of the Okryu Bridge to the Okryu-gwan. The soil in which the willow grows is a piled soil carved by the flow of the Daedong River, and the mechanical composition is sandy loam, and manure and drainage are appropriate. The Korean weeping willows of Okryu were planted around 1860. The tree is 4.5m in circumference at root neck, 4.6m in circumference at breast height, 17m in diameter from east to west, 26m from north to south, and 16m in tree height. At a height of 1.5m and 2m, the tree split into three branches and slanted slightly towards the Daedonggang River. The tree cap is kite-shaped. The Korean weeping willows of Okryu, known as <Ryukyong> from old times, show the beauty of Pyongyang and enhance the scenery of the Daedonggang River, which is being transformed grandly and splendidly, so North Korean government thinks it should be actively protected.	Salix pseudolasiogyne
3	Pagoda trees of the Ch'ŏngryu Cliffs 청류벽회화나무/淸流壁회화나무	Moranbong Park, Pyongyang	The place where the Pagoda trees of the Ch'ŏngryu Cliffs grows is Kyŏngsang-dong, Chung-guyok, Pyongyang. The Pagoda tree grows in the middle of the cliff of the clear stream wall of Moranbong Peak. The soil where the Pagoda trees of the Ch'ŏngryu Cliffs grow is a barren land with a clear stream wall, and the bank of the Daedong River is a sandy land. The soil of the cliff where this tree grows is brown forest soil and hangs. The tree has grown spontaneously since around 1790. It is a tall tree whose leaves drop, and the height of the tree is 10m. This locust tree is so wedge-shaped that it is hard to tell whether it is a root or a stem. Trees are growing toward the Daedonggang River, spreading their shades like fan blades. Root neck girth was 1.8m, 1.68m, 1.4m, 1.1m, 1m. The root descended about 4m along the rock that fell vertically and went into the rock. The diameter of the root neck that has become like a stem is 1.3m, and it is 0.6m when it goes down about 3m. It has been designated as Natural Monument No. 3 and is under protection and management.	Sophora japonica
6	Poplar trees of the Pot'ong River 보통강뽀뿌라나무/普通江뽀뿌라나무	Pot'onggang-dong, Pot'onggang-guyŏk, Pyongyang	Tree	Populus sp.
8	Dahurian larch trees of Munsubong hill 문수봉이깔나무/文繡峰이깔나무	Raengch'ŏn-dong, Tongdaewŏn-guyŏk, Pyongyang	Tree	Larix gmelinii
9	Jujube trees of Tŏkdong 덕동대추나무/德洞大棗나무	Tŏkdong-ri, Sadong-guyŏk, Pyongyang	Tree	Zizyphus zizyphus
10	Metasequoia trees of Mount Taesŏng 대성산수삼나무/大城山水杉나무	Taesŏng-dong, Taesŏng-guyŏk, Pyongyang	Tree	Metasequoia glyptostroboides
11	Siebold's magnolia trees of Mount Taesŏng 대성산목란/大城山木蘭	Taesŏng-dong, Taesŏng-guyŏk, Pyongyang	Tree	Magnolia sieboldii
12	White forsythia trees of Mount Taesŏng 대성산미선나무/大城山尾扇나무	Taesŏng-dong, Taesŏng-guyŏk, Pyongyang	Tree	Abeliophyllum distichum
13	Eucommia trees of Mount Taesŏng 대성산두충나무/大城山杜仲나무	Taesŏng-dong, Taesŏng-guyŏk, Pyongyang	Tree	Eucommia ulmoides
14	Chinese catalpa of Mount Taesŏng 대성산향오동나무/大城山香梧桐나무	Taesŏng-dong, Taesŏng-guyŏk, Pyongyang	Tree	Catalpa ovata
15	Japanese wisteria of Mount Taesŏng 대성산참등나무/大城山참藤나무	Taesŏng-dong, Taesŏng-guyŏk, Pyongyang	Tree	Wisteria floribunda
16	Chinese juniper of Mount Taesŏng 대성산뚝향나무/大城山뚝香나무	Taesŏng-dong, Taesŏng-guyŏk, Pyongyang	Tree	Juniperus chinensis
17	Mesozoic fossils of Mount Taesŏng 대성산중생대화석/大城山中生代化石	Taesŏng-dong, Taesŏng-guyŏk, Pyongyang		
18	Korean aspen trees of Mangyŏngdae 만경대백양나무/萬景臺白楊나무	Mangyŏngdae-dong, Mangyŏngdae-guyŏk, Pyongyang	Tree	Populus davidiana
19	Japanese zelkova trees of Mt. Ryongak 룡악산느티나무/龍嶽山느티나무	Ryongbong-ri, Mangyŏngdae-guyŏk, Pyongyang	Tree	Zelkova serrata
20	Chinese mahogany trees of Mount Ryongak 룡악산참중나무/龍嶽山참중나무	Ryongbong-ri, Mangyŏngdae-guyŏk, Pyongyang	Tree	Cedrela sinensis
22	Pagoda trees of Mount Ryongak 룡악산회화나무/龍嶽山회화나무	Ryongbong-ri, Mangyŏngdae-guyŏk, Pyongyang	Tree	Sophora japonica
23	Fold valley of west Pyongyang 서평양습곡/西平壤褶曲	Chungdang-ri, Hyŏngjesan-guyŏk, Pyongyang		
24	Honam-ri soft-shelled turtle habitat 호남리자라살이터/湖南里자라살이터	Honam-ri, Samsŏk-guyŏk, Pyongyang	Reptile	Trionychidae sp.
25	Japanese red pine forest of Ryongsan-ri 룡산리소나무림/龍山里소나무林	Ryongsan-ri, Ryŏkp'o-guyŏk, Pyongyang	Forest	Pinus densiflora
26	Sawthorn oak trees of Sangwŏn 상원가둑나무/祥原가둑나무	Taedong-ri, Sangwŏn-gun, Pyongyang	Tree	Quercus acutissima
28	Koryŏngsan Plateau 고령산평탄면/高靈山平坦面	Rodong-ri, Sangwŏn-gun, Pyongyang		
29	Ryongsan-ri seaweed fossils 룡산리해조류화석/龍山里海藻類化石	Ryongsan-ri, Chunghwa-gun, Pyongyang		
30	River terrace of Wŏlp'o-ri 월포리하성단구/月浦里河成段丘	Wŏlp'o-ri, P'yŏngsŏng		
31	Ginkgo trees of the Anguksa Buddhist temple 안국사은행나무/安國寺銀杏나무	Ponghak-dong, P'yŏngsŏng	Tree	Ginkgo biloba
32	Japanese red pine trees of Ryulhwa 률화소나무/栗花소나무	Ryulhwa-ri, P'yŏngsŏng	Tree	Pinus densiflora
33	Ginkgos of Chasan 자산은행나무/慈山銀杏나무	Chasan-ri, P'yŏngsŏng	Tree	Ginkgo biloba
34	P'yŏngnam Hot Springs 평남온천/平南溫泉	Onch'ŏn		
36	Great bustards of South P'yŏngan 평안남도너화/平安南道너화	Chŭngsan-gun/Onch'ŏn-gun	Bird	Otis tarda
37	Sea bird habitat of Tŏk Island 덕도바다새번식지/德島바다새繁殖地	Kŭmsŏng-ri, Onch'ŏn-gun	Bird	
38	Crested ibis of South P'yŏngan 평안남도따오기/平安南道따오기	Chŭngsan-gun/Onch'ŏn-gun	Bird	Nipponia nippon
40	Japanese honey locust trees of Sukch'ŏn 숙천주염나무/肅川주염나무	Sinp'ung-ri, Sukch'ŏn-gun	Tree	Gleditsia japonica
41	Ginkgo tree of the P'yŏngwon Training Ground 평원훈련정은행나무/平原訓鍊亭銀杏나무	P'yŏngwŏn	Tree	Ginkgo biloba
42	Pear tree of Ŭnjŏng 은정배나무/은정배나무	Masan-ri, Mundŏk-gun	Tree	Pyrus pyrifolia
43	Flower Cave of Kaech'ŏn 개천꽃동굴/价川꽃洞窟	Ryongwŏn Worker's District, Kaech'ŏn		
44	Chinese egret and grey heron habitat of Ryongun-ri 룡운리백로왜가리번식지/龍雲里白鷺왜가리繁殖地	Ryongun-ri, Kaech'ŏn	Bird	Ardea cinerea/Egretta eulophotes
45	Oak trees of Kangdong 강동참나무/江東참나무	Hyangmok-ri, Kangdong-gun, Pyongyang	Tree	Quercus sp.
46	Spikemoss community of Sŏngch'ŏn 성천가지부처손군락/成川가지부처손群落	Sŏngch'ŏn	Herb	Selaginella sp.
47	Fold valley of Sŏngch'ŏn 성천습곡/成川褶曲	Ŭngok Worker's District, Sŏngch'ŏn		
48	Sŏkt'ang Hot Springs 석탕온천/石湯溫泉	Onjŏng-ri, Yangdŏk-gun		
49	Scheelite outcropping of Kŏch'a 거차회중석로두/巨次灰重石露頭	Kŏsang-ri, Yangdŏk-gun		
50	Korean stewartia of Yangdŏk 양덕금수목/陽德錦繡木	Unch'ang-ri, Yangdŏk-gun	Tree	Stewartia koreana

=== 50-100 ===
Missing numbers are simply numbers that are not designated with natural monuments.

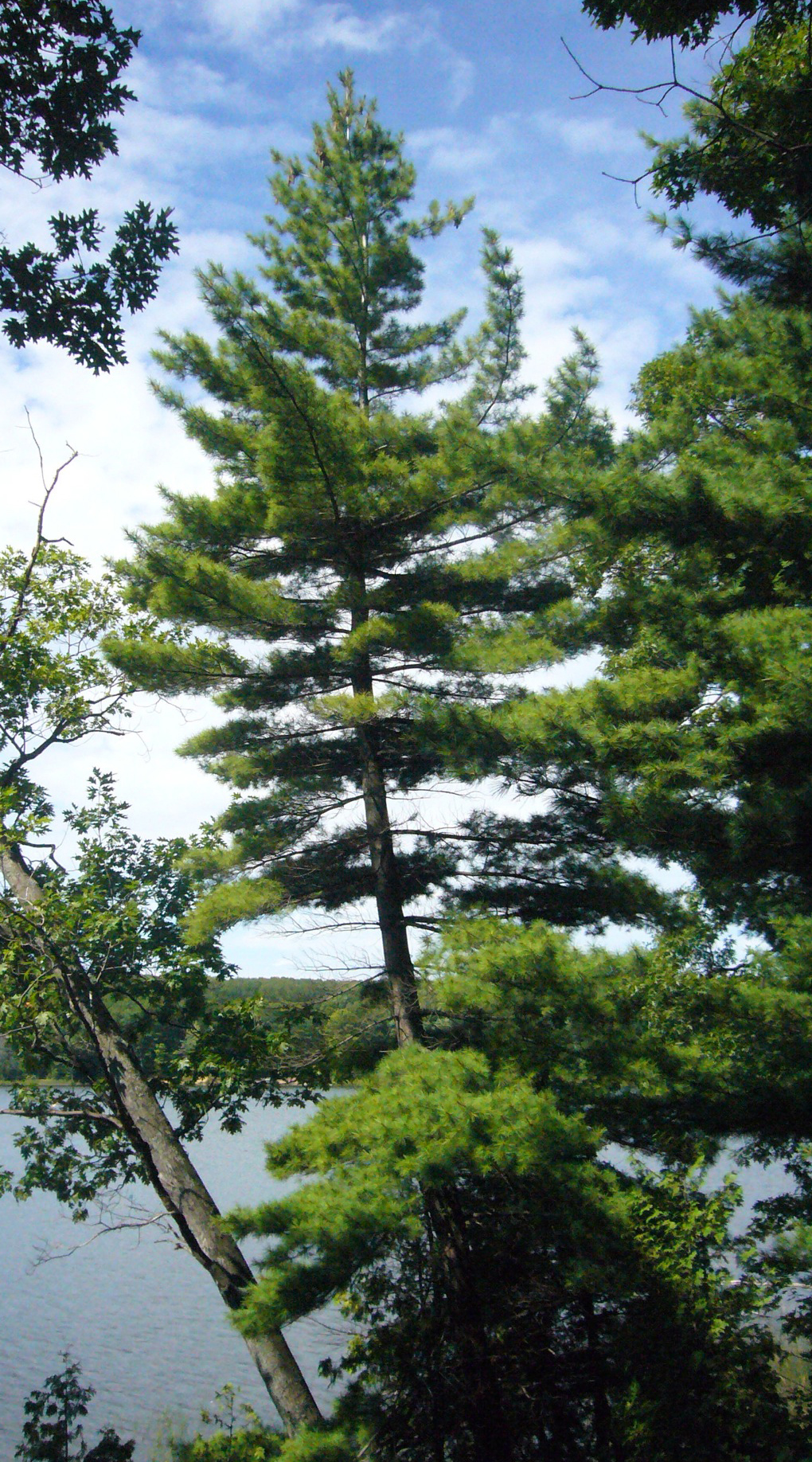
Eastern white pine trees, Korean natural monument #51.

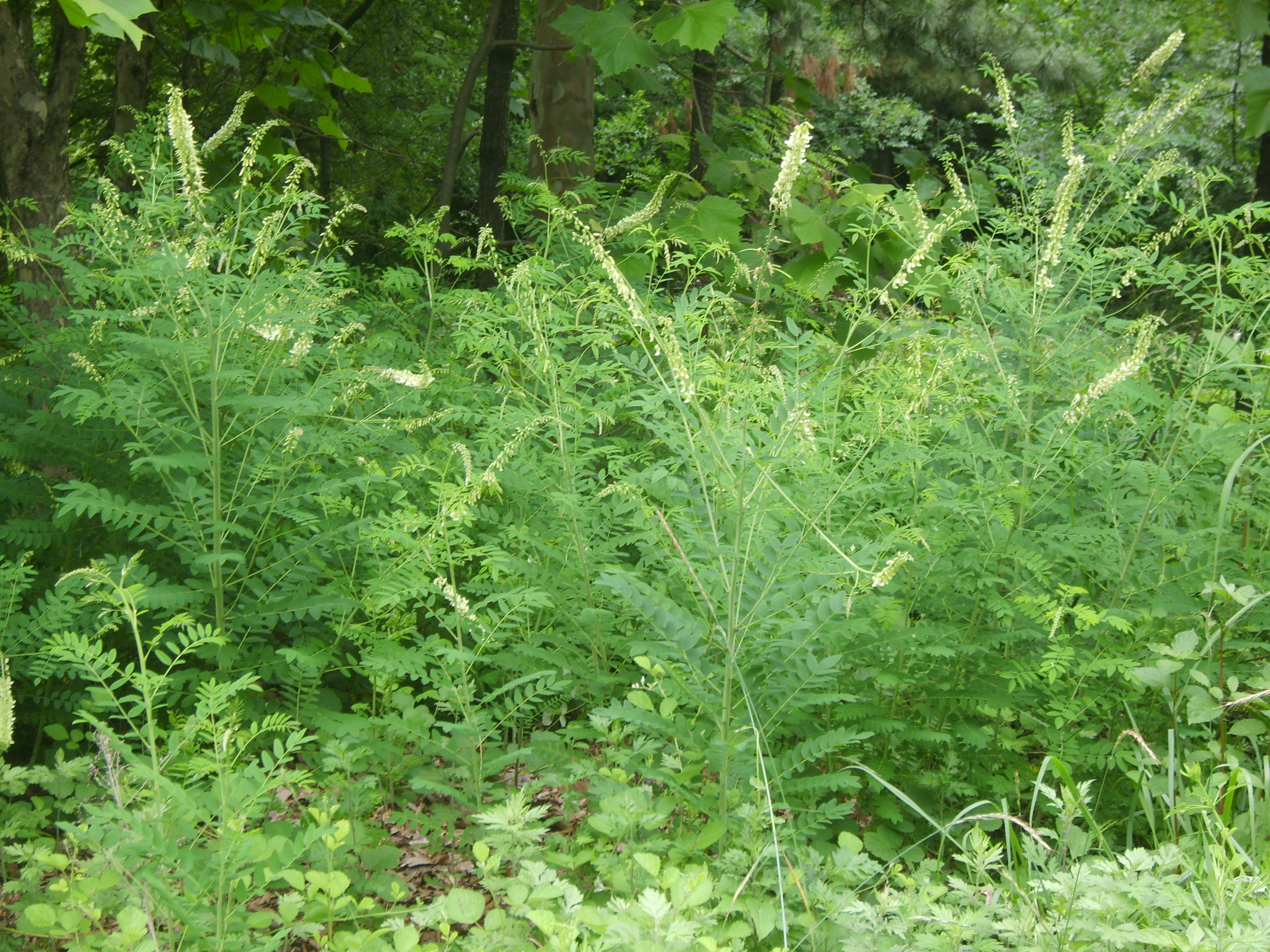
Sophora flavescens, Korean natural monument #52.

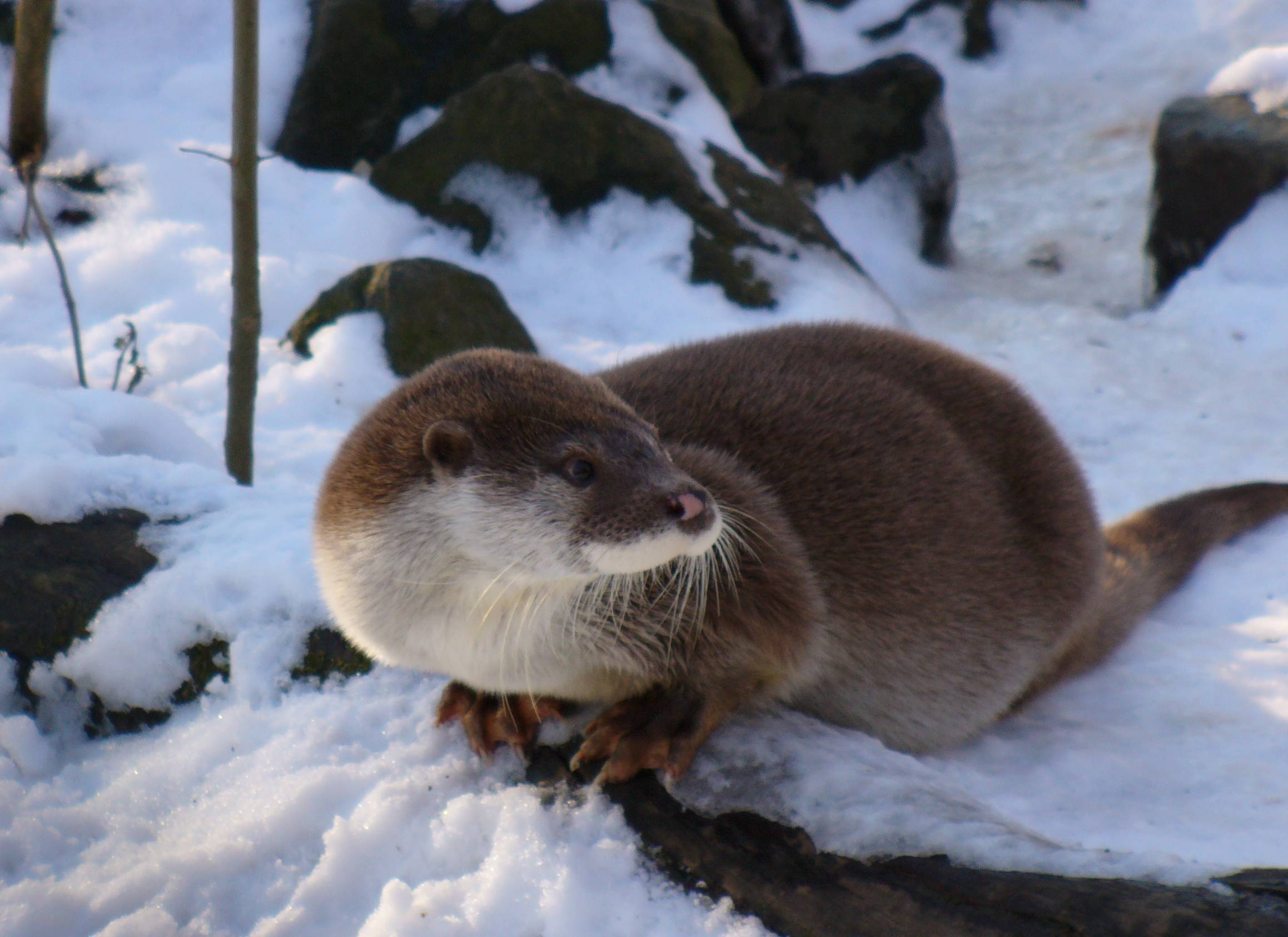
A European otter, Korean natural monument #55.

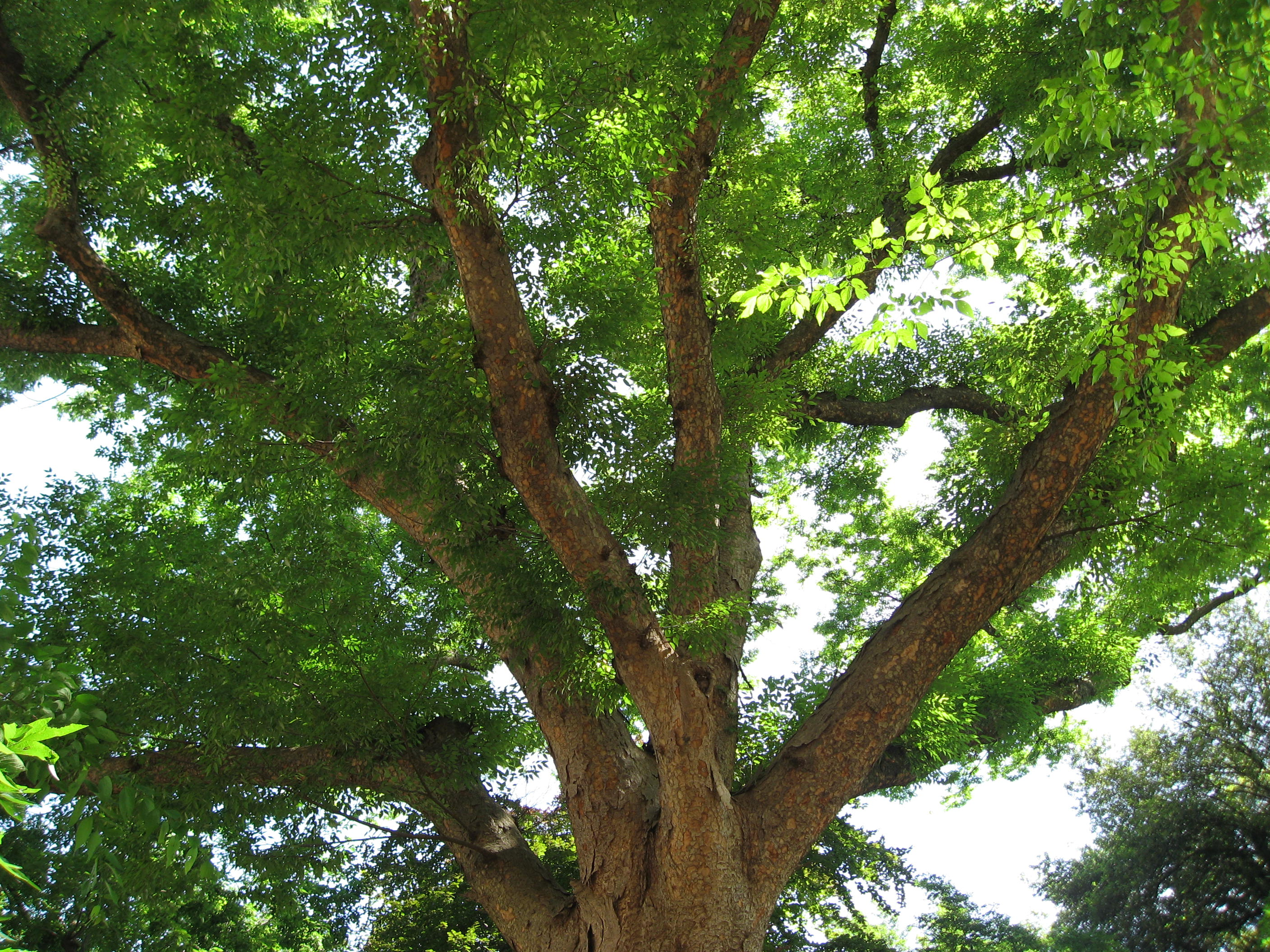
A Japanese zelkova, Korean natural monument #62.

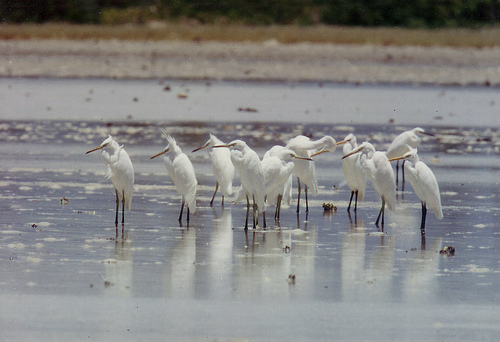
Chinese egrets, Korean natural monument #100.

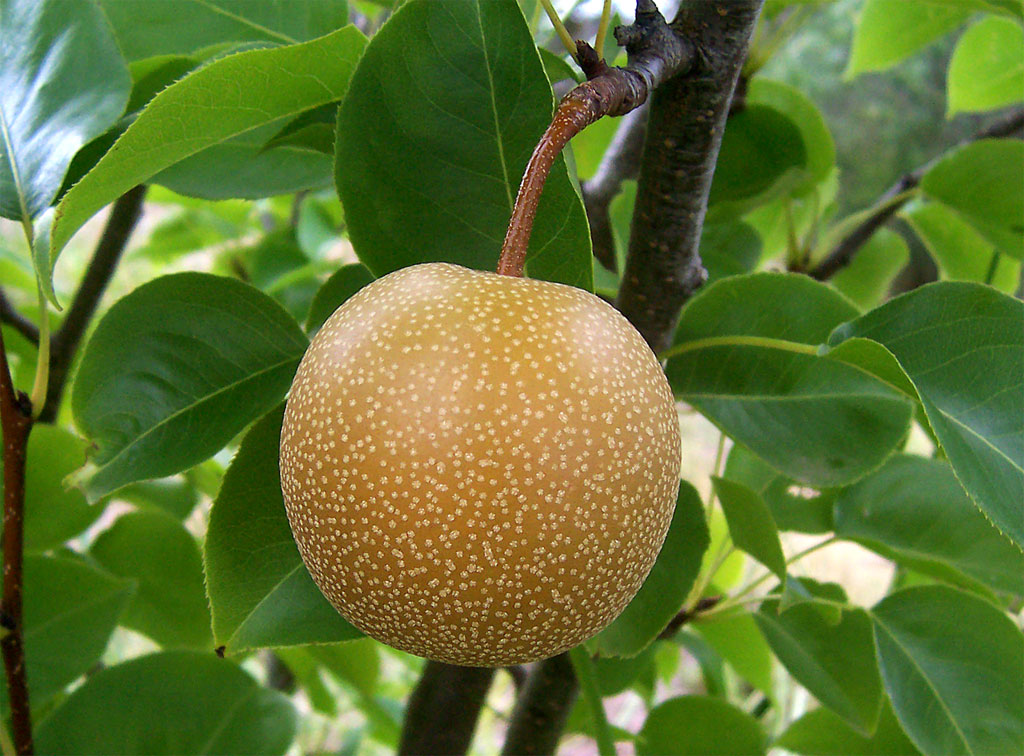
A Korean pear, Korean natural monument #74.

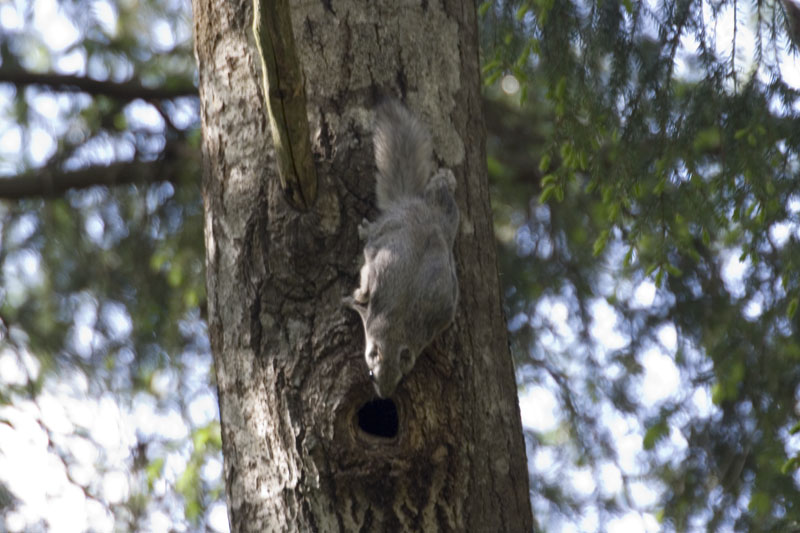
A Siberian flying squirrel, Korean natural monument #83.

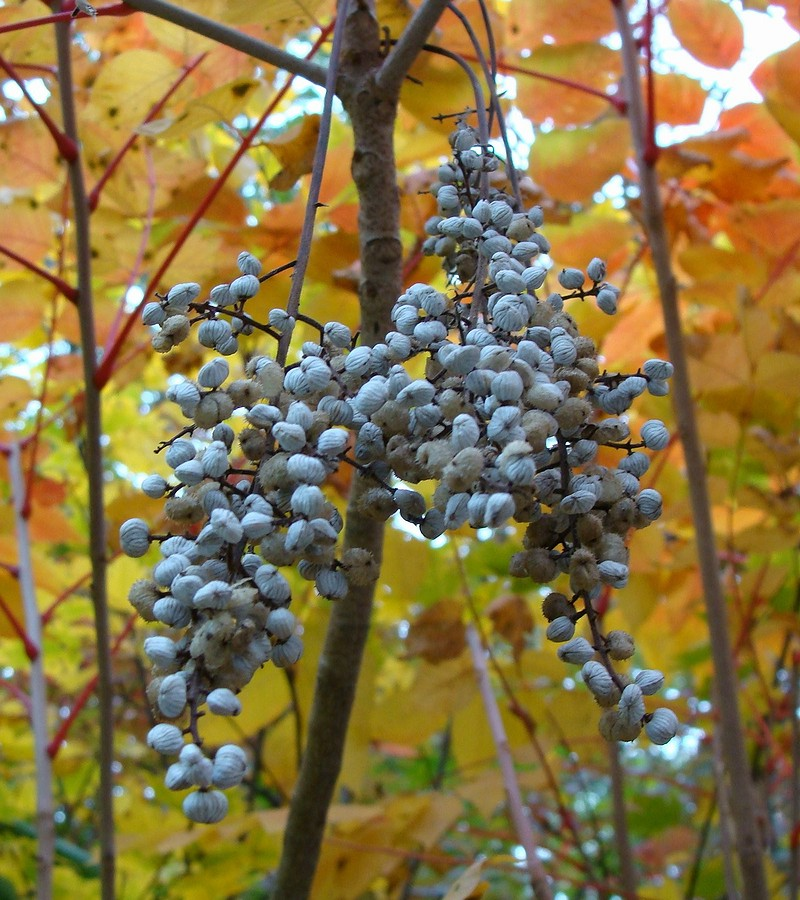
A lacquer tree, Korean natural monument #94.

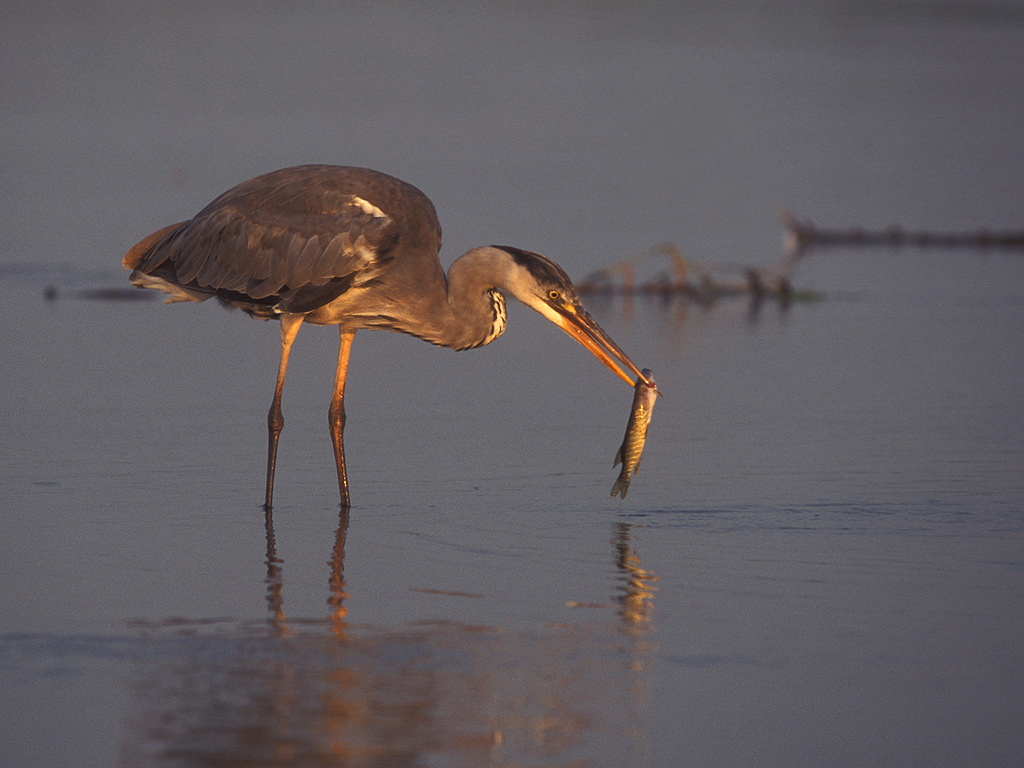
A grey heron, Korean natural monument #100.

	Name (Korean name)	Location	Description	Scientific name
51	Eastern white pine forest of Ryongp'o 룡포가는잎소나무림/龍浦가는잎소나무林	Inp'o Worker's District, Pukch'ang-gun	Tree	Pinus strobus
52	Sophora community of Pukch'ang 북창고삼나무군락/北倉苦蔘나무群落	Namyang-ri, Pukch'ang-gun	Herb	Sophora flavescens
53	Japanese black pine forest of Maengsan 맹산흑송림/孟山黑松林	Maengsan	Tree	Pinus thunbergii
55	Taehŭng European otter 대흥수달/大興水獺	Taehŭng-gun	Mammal	Lutra lutra
56	Medicinal springs of Kangsŏ 강서약수/江西藥水	Yaksu-ri, Kangsŏ-gun, Namp'o		
57	Korean aspen trees of Kangsŏn 강선백양나무/降仙白楊나무	Sangbong-dong, Ch'ŏllima-gun, Namp'o	Tree	Populus davidiana
58	Pagoda tree of Songho 송호회화나무/松湖회화나무	Kangch'ŏl-dong, Ch'ŏllima-gun, Namp'o	Tree	Styphnolobium japonicum
59	Chinese chestnut tree of Susan-ri 수산리약밤나무/水山里약밤나무	Susan-ri, Kangsŏ-gun, Namp'o	Tree	Castanea mollissima
60	Japanese zelkova tree of Usanjang 우산장느티나무/牛山莊느티나무	Usan-ri, Hyanggu-guyŏk, Namp'o	Tree	Zelkova serrata
61	Ripple marks of Kŏmsan-ri 검산리련흔/檢山里漣痕	Kŏmsan-ri, Hyanggu-guyŏk, Namp'o		
62	Japanese zelkova tree of Ryonggang 룡강느티나무/龍岡느티나무	Okdo-ri, Ryonggang-gun, Namp'o	Tree	Zelkova serrata
63	Elephant Rock of Pidansŏm 비단섬코끼리바위/緋緞島象巖	Pidan-do, Sindo-gun		
64	Makdae Rock 막대바위	Namam-ri, Yŏmju-gun		
66	Pine windbreak of Changsong 장송소나무방풍림/長松소나무防風林	Changsong Worker's District, Ch'ŏlsan-gun	Tree	Pinus sp.
67	Ch'ŏlsan mussel habitat 철산조개살이터/鐵山조개살이터	Changsong Worker's District, Ch'ŏlsan-gun	Shellfish	
68	Samch'a-do seabird breeding site 삼차도바다새번식지/蔘茶島바다새繁殖地	Changsong Worker's District, Ch'ŏlsan-gun	Bird	
69	Tongrim Waterfall 동림폭포/東林瀑布	Kogunyang-ri, Tongrim-gun		
70	Manchurian ash trees of Tongrim 동림들메나무/東林들메나무	Singok Worker's District, Tongrim-gun	Tree	Fraxinus mandschurica
71	Rap-do seabird breeding site 랍도바다새번식지/蠟島바다새繁殖地	Unjong-ri, Sŏnch'ŏn-gun	Bird	
72	Moki-do Chinese egret breeding site 묵이도노랑부리백로번식지/묵이島노랑부리白鷺繁殖地	Unjong-ri, Sŏnch'ŏn-gun	Bird	Egretta eulophotes
73	Sŏnch'ŏn Taejangji habitat 선천대장지살이터/宣川대장지살이터	Sŏkhwa-ri, Sŏnch'ŏn-gun	Reptile	
74	Korean pear tree of Posan 보산배나무/寶山배나무	Namho-ri, Chŏngju	Tree	Pyrus pyrifolia
75	Ginkgo tree of Chŏngju 정주은행나무/定州銀杏나무	Sema-ri, Chŏngju	Tree	Ginkgo biloba
76	Unmu-do seabird breeding site 운무도바다새번식지/雲霧島바다새繁殖地	Edo-dong, Chŏngju	Bird	
77	Taegam-do seabird breeding site 대감도바다새번식지/大甘島바다새繁殖地	Edo-dong, Chŏngju	Bird	
78	Tortoise Rock of Yongbyon 거북바위/龜岩	Yongbyon		
80	Ryongmun Cave 룡문대굴/龍門大窟	Ryongmun Worker's District, Kujang-gun		
81	Paekryŏng Cave 백령대굴/百嶺大窟	Taep'ung-ri, Kujang-gun		
82	Myohyangsan bluebird 묘향산청조/妙香山青鳥	Hyangam-ri, Hyangsan-gun	Bird	
83	Siberian flying squirrel of Mount Myohyang 묘향산날다라미/妙香山날다라미	Hyangam-ri, Hyangsan-gun	Mammal	Pteromys volans
84	Sanju Falls 산주폭포/散珠瀑布	Hyangam-ri, Hyangsan-gun		
85	Ryongyŏn Falls 룡연폭포/龍淵瀑布	Hyangam-ri, Hyangsan-gun		
86	Ch'ŏnju Rock 천주석/天柱石	Hyangam-ri, Hyangsan-gun		
87	Manchurian ash trees of Mount Myohyang 묘향산들메나무/妙香山들메나무	Hyangam-ri, Hyangsan-gun	Tree	Fraxinus mandschurica
88	Mulberry tree of Mount Myohyang 묘향산산뽕나무/妙香山산뽕나무	Hyangam-ri, Hyangsan-gun	Tree	Morus bombycis
89	Pine trees of Mount Myohyang 묘향산소나무/妙香山소나무	Hyangam-ri, Hyangsan-gun	Tree	Pinus sp.
90	Ch'ŏnsin Falls 천신폭포/天神瀑布	Hyangam-ri, Hyangsan-gun		
91	Korean azalea grove of Mount Myohyang 묘향산두봉화군락/妙香山두봉花群落	Hyangam-ri, Hyangsan-gun	Tree	Rhododendron yedoense
92	Ginkgo tree of Sangwŏn Hermitage 상원암은행나무/上元庵銀杏나무	Hyangam-ri, Hyangsan-gun	Tree	Ginkgo biloba
93	Siberian elm trees of Hyangsang 향상비슬나무/香上비슬나무	T'aep'yŏng-ri, Hyangsan-gun	Tree	Ulmus pumila
94	Lacquer tree grove of Hakdang 학당옻나무군락/鶴塘옻나무群落	Hakdang-ri, T'aech'ŏn-gun	Tree	Toxicodendron vernicifluum
95	Dove refuge of Ŭiju 의주재비둘기번식지/義州재비둘기繁殖地	Ŭiju	Bird	Columbidae fam.
96	Japanese bigleaf magnolia grove of Sakju 삭주황목련군락/朔州黃木蓮群落	Onch'ŏn Worker's District, Sakju-gun	Tree	Magnolia obovata
97	Manchurian fir trees of Chwa-ri 좌리전나무/佐里전나무	Chwa-ri, Sakju-gun	Tree	Abies holophylla
99	Tangasan Falls 당아산폭포/堂峨山瀑布	Haksong-ri, Tongch'ang-gun		
100	Nongol egret and grey heron breeding site 논골백로왜가리번식지/논골白鷺왜가리繁殖地	Turyong-ri, Tongch'ang-gun	Bird	

=== No. 101 - 150 ===
Missing numbers are simply numbers that are not designated with natural monuments.

	Name (Korean name)	Location	Description	Scientific name
102	Hŭngju chickens 흥주닭/興州닭	Hŭngju-dong, Kanggye	Bird	Gallus gallus
103	Japanese yew tree of Mount Oga 오가산주목/五佳山朱木	Karim-ri, Hwap'yŏng-gun	Tree	Taxus cuspidata
104	Korean pine trees of Mount Oga 오가산잣나무/五佳山잣나무	Karim-ri, Hwap'yŏng-gun	Tree	Pinus koraiensis
105	Korean pine tree of Kasan Pass 가산령잣나무/佳山嶺잣나무	Karim-ri, Hwap'yŏng-gun	Tree	Pinus koraiensis
107	Variety of Tilia tree of Mount Oga 오가산쉼터피나무/五佳山쉼터피나무	Karim-ri, Hwap'yŏng-gun	Tree	Tilia sp.
108	Linden tree of Mount Oga 오가산피나무/五佳山피나무	Karim-ri, Hwap'yŏng-gun	Tree	Tilia sp.
110	Parnassius eversmanni butterflies 노랑홍모시범나비	Mount Ryŏnhwa, Rangrim-gun	Butterfly	Parnassius eversmanni
111	Ryongsu Falls 룡수폭포/龍水瀑布	Ch'ŏnjang-ri, Sijung-gun		
112	Jezo spruce forest of Sijung 시중긴방울가문비나무림/時中긴방울가문비나무林	Ch'ŏnjang-ri, Sijung-gun	Forest	Picea jezoensis
113	Plant fossils of Chunggang 중강식물화석/中江植物化石	Chungdŏk-ri, Chunggang-gun		
114	Osudŏk Korean pine forest 오수덕잣나무림/烏首德잣나무林	Osu-ri, Chunggang-gun	Forest	Pinus koraiensis
115	Siberian elm trees of Angt'o 앙토비슬나무/央土비슬나무	Angt'o-ri, Ch'osan-gun	Tree	Ulmus pumila
116	"Manjisong" (many-branched pine tree) of Ryongdae 룡대만지송/龍大萬枝松	Ryongdae-ri, Kop'ung-gun	Tree	Pinus sp.
117	Entrenched river of Sŏngha 성하감입사행/城河嵌入蛇行	Sŏngha Worker's District, Sŏnggan-gun		
118	Poplar trees of Sŏnggan 성간뽀뿌라나무/城干뽀뿌라나무	Sŏnggan	Tree	Populus sp.
119	Chinese hawthorn tree of Sŏngha 성하왕찔광나무/城河왕찔광나무	Sŏngha Worker's District, Sŏnggan-gun	Tree	Crataegus pinnatifida
121	Bergenia community of Chŏnch'ŏn 전천돌부채군락/前川돌부채群落	Mup'yŏng-ri, Chŏnch'ŏn-gun	Flower	Bergenia pacifica
122	Manchurian fir tree of Chŏnch'ŏn 전천전나무/前川전나무	Waun-ri, Chŏnch'ŏn-gun	Tree	Abies holophylla
123	Wagalbong Korean tiger 와갈봉조선범/臥碣峰朝鮮범	Rangrim-gun/Ryongrim-gun	Mammal	Panthera tigris altaica
124	Ryongrim brown bear 룡림큰곰/龍林큰곰	Huji-ri, Ryongrim-gun	Mammal	Ursus arctos
125	Haeju rakusam 해주락우삼/海州落羽杉	Okgye-dong, Haeju	Tree	
126	Deodar cedar of Haeju 해주설송/海州雪松	Kuje-dong, Haeju	Tree	Cedrus deodara
128	Sahyŏn-ri grey heron breeding site 사현리왜가리번식지/士峴里왜가리繁殖地	Sahyŏn-ri, Pyŏksŏng-gun	Bird	Ardea cinerea
129	Japanese zelkova tree of Sŏkdam 석담느티나무/石潭느티나무	Sŏkdam-ri, Pyoksŏng-gun	Tree	Zelkova serrata
130	Kangryŏng red-crowned crane habitat 강령흰두루미살이터/康翎흰두루미살이터	Tongp'o-ri, Kangryŏng-gun	Bird	Grus japonensis
131	Neverita snail fossils of Kangryŏng 강령골뱅이화석/康翎골뱅이化石	Sikyŏ-ri, Kangryŏng-gun		
132	Charales seaweed fossils of Kangryŏng 강령차축조화석/康翎車軸藻化石	Inbong-ri, Kangryŏng-gun		
133	Ongjin white-naped crane habitat 옹진재두루미살이터/甕津재두루미살이터	Namhae Worker's District, Ongjin-gun	Bird	Grus vipor
134	Porphyra seaweed of Ongjin 옹진참김/甕津참김	Namhae Worker's District, Ongjin-gun	Algae	Porphyra tenera
135	Chinese fringetree of Ongjin 옹진이팝나무/甕津이팝나무	Rimsŏk-ri, Ongjin-gun	Tree	Chionanthus retusus
136	Ongjin Hot Springs 옹진온천/甕津溫泉	Ongjin		
138	Manchurian walnut of Ongjin 옹진쪽가래나무/甕津쪽가래나무	Songwol-ri, Ongjin	Tree	Juglans mandshurica
139	Korean cow of Jangyeon 장연조선소/長淵朝鮮소	Jangyeon county	animal	
141	Rock of Ocha 오차바위/吾叉바위	Och'ajil-li,Ryongyon County	Rock	
142	The sand dunes of Monggŭmp'o 몽금포사구/夢金浦沙丘	Monggŭmp'o-ri,Ryongyon County	Sand dune	
143	The elephant rock of Monggŭmp'o 몽금포코끼리바위/夢金浦코끼리바위	Monggŭmp'o-ri,Ryongyon County	Rock	
144	The Chinese juniper of Songhwa 송화향나무/松禾香나무	Wŏndang-ri,Songhwa County	Tree	
145	Ginko of Kwail County 과일군은행나무/과일郡銀杏나무	Kwail County	Tree	Ginkgo biloba
146	Kuwol mountain baby frog habitat 구월산애기개구리살이터/九月山개구리살이터	Unnyul County	Amphibians	Rana amurensis
147	Magnolia obovata of Unyul county(Honggol) 홍골(은률)황목련/홍골殷栗黃木蓮	Unnyul County	Flowers	
148	Water with medicinal qualities from Chojung 초정약수/椒井藥水	Unchon County	Water	
150	Japanese elm of Anak county 안악느티나무/安岳느티나무	Anak County	Tree	Zelkova serrata

=== No.151-No.200 ===
Missing numbers are simply numbers that are not designated with natural monuments.

	Name (Korean name)	Location	Description	Scientific name
151	Sinchon Hot springs 신천온천/信川溫泉	Onch'ŏl-li,Sinchon County	Hot springs	
152	12 mountain bends of Jangsu mountain 장수산열두굽이/長壽山열두굽이	Sŏrim-ri,Chaeryong County		
153	Hairy forysthias of Jangsu mountain 장수산향수꽃나무/長壽山香水꽃나무	Sŏrim-ri,Chaeryong County	Flower	Forsythia velutina Nakai
154	Geological Folds of Jangsu mountain 장수산습곡/長壽山褶曲	Pongo-ri,Chaeryong County		
155	Twin Japanese elms of Sinwon county 신원쌍둥이느티나무/新院쌍둥이느티나무	Sinwon County	Trees	Zelkova serrata
156	Ginkgo tree of Sinwon county 신원은행나무/新院銀杏나무	Sinwon County	Trees	Ginkgo biloba
157	Habitat of Tristram's woodpeckers of Pongchon County 봉천클락새살이터/峯泉클락새살이터	Pongchon County	Birds	Dryocopus javensis richardsi
158	Japanese elm of Pongchon County 봉천느티나무/峯泉느티나무	Pongchon County	Trees	Zelkova serrata
159	Paechon hot springs 배천온천/白川溫泉	Paechon County	Hot springs	
160	Ginko trees of Paechon county 배천은행나무/白川銀杏나무	Paechon County	Trees	Ginkgo biloba
161	Goldenrain trees of Kangho ri 강호염주나무/江湖念珠나무	Kangho-ri,Paechon County	Trees	Koelreuteria paniculata
162	Chinese trumpet vines of Kangho ri 강호능소화/江湖凌霄花	Kangho-ri,Paechon County	Flowers	Campsis grandiflora
163	Honghyonri Chinese egret habitat 홍현리백로살이터/紅峴里白鷺살이터	Honghyon-ri, Paechon County	Bird	Egretta eulophotes
164	Paechon White-naped crane habitat 배천재두루미살이터/白川재두루미살이터	Paechon County	Bird	Antigone vipio
165	Ginko trees of Yonan county 연안은행나무/延安銀杏나무	Yonan County	Trees	Ginkgo biloba
166	Basal layer of fossils of Songrim mountain 송림산통바닥층/松林山통바닥層	Yonan County		
167	Trilobite fossil from Heukgyori 흑교삼엽충화석/黑橋三葉蟲化石	Heukgyo-ri,Hwangju County	Fossils	
168	Lotuses from Hwangju 황주련꽃/黃州蓮꽃	Hwangju County	Flowers	Nelumbo
169	Chinese juniper of Samjonri 삼전향나무/三田香나무	Hwangju County	Tree	Juniperus chinensis
170	Japanese elms of Pongjin 봉진느티나무/鳳進느티나무	Hwangju County	Trees	Zelkova serrata
172	Seaweed fossil from Unpa 은파해조류화석/銀波海藻類化石	Unpa County	Fossils	
173	Habitat of Tristram's woodpeckers of Rinsan County 린산클락새살이터/麟山클락새살이터	Rinsan County	Birds	Dryocopus javensis richardsi
174	Juglans mandshurica of Sohung County 서흥가래나무/瑞興가래나무	Sohung County	trees	Juglans mandshurica
175	Group of Exochorda serratifolia of Dapdongsan 답동산가침박달군락/沓洞山가침朴達郡落	Sohung County	trees	Exochorda serratifolia
176	Outcrop rock of Holdong 홀동석로두/笏洞石露頭	Holdong rodongjagu,Yonsan County	rocks	
177	Twin cliffs of Namgang river 남강쌍절벽/南江雙絶壁	Daeryongri,Yonsan County	rocks	
178	Namcheon Waterfall 남천폭포/南川瀑布	Sinpyong County		
179	Talhaesanseong Cliff 달해산성절벽/達海山城	Sinpyong County	rocks	
182	Pine tree of Dongsanri 동산리소나무/東山里소나무	Koksan County	Trees	Pinus densiflora
183	Pine tree at the entrance (of Junggyedong) 입문소나무/入門소나무	Koksan County	Trees	Pinus densiflora
184	Ginkgo tree of Singye 신계은행나무/新溪銀杏나무	Singye County	Trees	Ginkgo biloba
185	Group of Magnolia obovata of Singye 신계황목련군락/新溪黃木蓮郡落	Singye County	trees	Magnolia obovata
186	Gurak-ri soft-shelled turtle habitat 구락리자라살이터/龜洛里자라살이터	Singye County	Reptile	Trionychidae sp.
187	Gurak-ri Korean doty barbel habitat and swiri spawning grounds 구락리어름치쒜리알쓸이터/龜洛里어름치쒜리알쓸이터	Singye County	Fish	Hemibarbus mylodon, Coreoleuciscus splendidus
188	Kalopanax of Pyongsan 평산엄나무/平山엄나무	Pyongsan County	Tree	Kalopanax septemlobus
189	Jujube of Pyongsan 평산엄나무/平山대추나무	Pyongsan County	Tree	Ziziphus jujuba
190	Habitat of Tristram's woodpeckers of Pyongsan County 평산클락새살이터/平山클락새살이터	Pyongsan County	Birds	Dryocopus javensis richardsi
192	Japanese elms of Tosan 토산느티나무/兎山느티나무	Tosan County	Trees	Zelkova serrata
193	Myongsasipri beach 명사십리/明沙十里	Wonsan	beach	
195	Wonsan Japanese Umbrella pine 원산금송/元山錦松	Wonsan	Trees	Sciadopitys verticillata
197	Wonsan tulip tree 원산츄립프나무/元山츄립프나무	Wonsan	Trees	Liriodendron tulipifera
198	Wonsan Korean fir 원산구상나무/元山구상나무	Wonsan	Trees	Abies koreana
199	Wonsan Japanese horse chestnut tree 원산칠엽나무/元山칠엽나무	Wonsan	Trees	Aesculus turbinata

=== No.201-250 ===
Missing numbers are simply numbers that are not designated with natural monuments.

	Name (Korean name)	Location	Description	Scientific name
201	Wonsan Oriental persimmon tree 원산감나무/元山감나무	Wonsan	Trees	Diospyros kaki
202	Group of littleleaf box of Duryusan 두류산고양나무군락/頭流山고양나무郡落	Sohung County	trees	Buxus microphylla var. kor
203	Japanese elms of Anbyon 안변느티나무/安邊느티나무	Anbyon County	Trees	Zelkova serrata
205	Korean tiger of Chooae Mountain 추애산조선범/秋愛山朝鮮범	Sepo County, Kosan County, Poptong County	Mammals	Panthera tigris tigris
206	Pine tree of Winamri 위남리소나무/衛南里소나무	Winamri,Kosan County	Trees	Pinus densiflora
207	Pine tree forest of Seokwang temple 석왕사소나무림/釋王寺소나무林	Kosan County	Trees	Pinus densiflora
208	Japanese elms of Seokwang temple 석왕사느티나무/釋王寺느티나무	Kosan County	Trees	Zelkova serrata
209	Medicinal springs of Seokwang temple 석왕사약수/釋王寺藥水	Kosan County	Water	
210	Swan habitat of Lake Chonapo 천아포고니살이터/天鵝浦고니살이터	Tongchon County	Birds	
211	Habitat of sea birds in Al island in Tongchon 통천알섬바다새번식지/通川알섬바다새繁殖地	Tongchon County	Birds	
212	Lake Sijung 시중호/侍中湖	Tongchon County	Lake	
213	Guk island 국섬/國섬	Tongchon County	Island	
214	Chongseok gazebo 총석정/叢石亭	Tongchon County	Gazebo	
215	Kumran cave 금란굴/金蘭窟	Tongchon County	Cave	
216	Chonsondae peak 천선대/天仙臺	Kosong County	Peak	
217	Chicken egg rock of Mount Kumgang 금강산닭알바위/金剛山닭알바위	Kosong County	rock	
218	Samilpo lake 삼일포/三日浦	Kosong County	lake	
219	Sangpaldam pond 상팔담/上八潭	Kosong County	lpond	
220	Samseonam rock 삼선암/三仙巖	Kosong County	rock	
221	Joyang waterfalls 조양폭포/朝陽暴布	Kumgang County	waterfalls	
222	Bibong waterfalls 비봉폭포/飛鳳暴布	Kosong County	waterfalls	
223	Twelve waterfalls 십이폭포/十二暴布	Kosong County	waterfalls	
224	Gwimyonam rocks 귀면암/鬼面巖	Kosong County	rocks	
225	Guryong waterfalls 구룡폭포/朝陽暴布	Kumgang County	waterfalls	
226	Mount Kumgang Hot Springs 금강산온천/金剛山溫泉	Kosong County	Hot springs	
227	Mount Kumgang crystals 금강수정/金剛水晶	Kosong County	crystals	
228	Haegeumgang sol seom 해금강솔섬/海金剛솔섬	Kosong County	island	
229	Haegeumgangmun 해금강문/海金剛門	Kosong County		
230	Outer Kumkang habitat of Chinese pond turtles 외금강남생이살이터/外金剛남생이살이터	Kosong County		Mauremys reevesii
231	Myeonggyeongdae peak 명경대/明鏡臺	Kumgang County		
232	Rare species of laceshrubs in Mount Kumgang 금강국수나무/金剛국수나무	Kumgang County		
233	Rare species of Hanabusaya asiatica in Mount Kumgang 금강초롱/金剛초롱	Kumgang County		
235	Changdo pine tree 창도늘어진소나무/창도늘어진소나무	Changdo County		
236	Steep valleys of Sambang 삼방협곡/삼방협곡	Sepo County		
237	Korean cows of Sepo County 세포조선소/세포조선소	Sepo County		
238	Medicinal springs of Sambang 삼방약수/삼방藥水	Sepo County	Water	
239	Viola flower of Sambang 삼방왕제비꽃/삼방왕제비꽃	Sepo County	Water	Viola websteri
240	Ginkgo trees of Dumundong 두문동은행나무/두문동銀杏나무	Chorwon County	Tree	Ginkgo biloba
241	Heroic Ginkgo trees of Ichon County 이천영웅은행나무/伊川英雄銀杏나무	Ichon County	Tree	Ginkgo biloba
242	Japanese zelkova trees of Umi-ri 우미리느티나무/우미리느티나무	Umiri,Ichon County	Tree	Zelkova serrata
243	Ginkgo trees of the village of Gajaewul 가재울은행나무/가재울銀杏나무	Chorwon County	Tree	Ginkgo biloba
244	Japanese zelkova trees of Sŏngbung-ri 성북느티나무/城北느티나무	Sŏngbung-ri,Ichon County	Tree	Zelkova serrata
245	Ryonghung-ri Chinese egret and grey heron breeding site 룡흥리백로왜가리번식지/龍興里백로왜가리繁殖地	Ryonghung-ri, Pangyo County	Bird	Ardea cinerea
246	Manchurian fir trees of Panyo 판교전나무/板橋전나무	Pangyo County	Tree	Abies holophylla
247	Pine tree of Kŭmgu-ri 금구리소나무/金龜里소나무	Kŭmgu-ri,Poptong County	Trees	Pinus densiflora
249	Popdong European otter 법동수달/法洞水獺	Poptong County	Mammal	Lutra lutra
250	Dokhung bat cave 덕흥박쥐굴/덕흥박쥐굴	Munchon	Cave	

=== No. 251 - 300 ===
	Name (Korean name)	Location	Description	Scientific name
251	Ginkgo trees of Mt. Donghung 동흥산은행나무/동흥산銀杏나무	Hamhung	Tree	Ginkgo biloba
252	Trained pine of Hamhung 함흥반송/咸興伴松	Hamhung Royal Villa, Hamhung	Tree	Pinus ???
254	Gugyeongdae- Turtle shaped cliff of Hungnam 흥남구경대/興南龜景臺	Hungnam, Hamhung	Cliff	
256	Chinese juniper of Honam 호남향나무/湖南香나무	Sinpo	Tree	Juniperus chinensis
257	Pagoda tree of Sokhu 속후회화나무/俗厚회화나무	Sinpo	Tree	Styphnolobium japonicum
258	The korean native chicken of Hamju 함주조선닭/咸洲朝鮮닭	Hamju	bird	
259	The waterfalls of Pekak 백악폭포/白岳瀑布	Yonggwang County	Natural landscape	
260	The musk deer of Mt. Chonbul 천불산사향노루/天佛山麝香노루	Yonggwang County	animal	
261	The Kalopanax tree of Sinhung 신흥엄나무/新興엄나무	Sinhung County	tree	Kalopanax septemlobus
263	The grey heron habitat in Somokri 서목리왜가리서식지/西목里왜가리棲息地	Changjin County	habitat	
264	The breeding ground of korean taimen in Changjin 장진정장어알쓸이터/長津정장어알쓸이터	Changjin County	habitat	Hucho ishikawae
265	The breeding ground of Alaska pollock(Myeongtae) in Changjin 속사강명태알쓸이터/속사강明太알쓸이터	Changjin County	habitat	
266	The Egret habitat of Changpyong 정평백로서식지/長平白鷺棲息地	Chongpyong County	habitat	
267	The "Kwangpo species" duck 광포종오리/廣浦種오리	Chongpyong County	bird	
268	Kwangpo lake 광포/廣浦	Chongpyong County	lake	
269	Sachol duck 사철오리/사철오리	Chongpyong County	invented duck variant	
270	The katsura tree of Chongpyong 정평구슬꽃잎나무/정평구슬꽃잎나무	Chongpyong County	tree	
271	The Ginko tree of Kumya 금야은행나무/금야은행나무	Kumya County	tree	
272	The big chestnut tree of Inhung 인흥왕밤나무/인흥왕밤나무	Kumya County	tree	
273	The japanese red pine trees of Kajin 가진소나무/가진소나무	Kumya County	tree	
274	Chinese juniper of Chongbaek 청백향나무/靑白香나무	Kumya County	Tree	Juniperus chinensis
275	Habitat of winter birds of Kumya County 금야겨울새살이터/金野겨울새살이터	Kumya County	Birds	
277	The japanese red pine trees of Songnam 성남소나무/성소나무	Sudong County	tree	
278	The rhyolites and perlites of Hongwon 홍원류문진주암/洪原流紋眞珠岩	Hongwon County	rocks	
279	Pine tree island of Hongwon 홍원솔섬/洪原솔섬	Hongwon County	island	
280	Ocean cave of Chongdo 청도해식굴/淸道海蝕窟	Hongwon County	cave	
283	Swarm of the bamboo species "Sasa coreana" of Taesom island 대섬신의대군락/대섬신의대군	Hongwon County	plant region	
284	Apple tree of Ryongjon 룡전사과나무/룡전사과나무	Pukchong County	plant	
285	Apple tree of Chosang 룡전사과나무/룡전사과나무	Pukchong County	plant	
286	Japanese pine trees of Chungdongri 중동리 소나무/중동리소나무	Toksong County	plant	
289	Spheric rocks of Riwon 리원구석/리원구	Riwon County	rock	
290	Haksade cliff of Riwon 리원학사대/리원학사대	Riwon County	landscape	
291	Swarm of Five-rib thyme of Kokguri 곡구리백리향군락/곡구리백리향군락	Riwon County	landscape	
292	East asian hackberry of Riwon 리원팽나무/리원팽나무	Riwon County	tree	
293	Antelope of Tanchon 단천산양/단천산	Tanchon	animal	
294	Jade rock of Poko 포거옥돌/포거옥돌	Tanchon	rock	
295	Five colored granite 오색화강암/오색화강	Tanchon	rock	
296	The bright body of Magnesite of Mt. Paekkum 백금산마그네사이트광체/백금산마그네사이트광	Tanchon	rock	
297	Lotus flowers of lake Tuyon 두연못련꽃/두연못련꽃	Tanchon	plant	
298	10,000 boughed pine trees of Tanchon 단천만지송/단천만지송	Tanchon	plant	
299	Outcrop rock of lithium rubellite of Hochon county 허천동광체로두/虛川銅鑛體露頭	Hochon County	rocks	

=== No. 301 - 350 ===
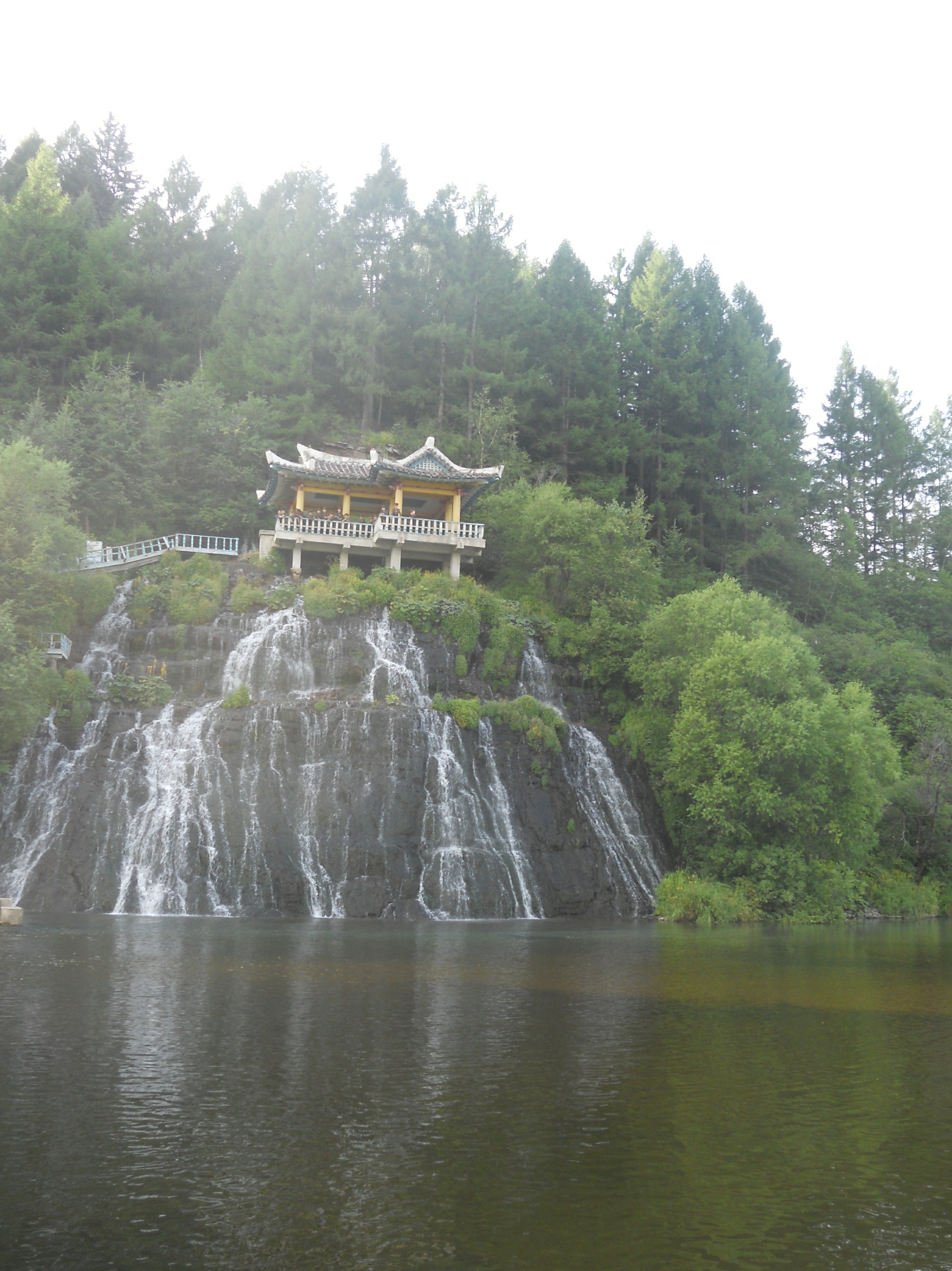
Rimyŏngsu Falls, Korean natural monument #345

	Name (Korean name)	Location	Description	Scientific name
305	Onsupyong Hot Springs 온수평온천/溫水坪溫泉	Kilju County	Hot springs	
319	savin juniper group of Myongchon 명천단천향나무/明川端川香나무	Myongchon County	Tree	Juniperus sabina
344	Naegok Hot Springs 내곡온천/內曲溫泉	Pochon County	Hot springs	
345	Rimyŏngsu Falls 리명수폭포/鯉明水瀑布	Rimyŏngsu Worker's District, Samjiyŏn-gun	Waterfall	

=== No. 351 - 400 ===
	Name (Korean name)	Location	Description	Scientific name
375	Onpo Hot Springs 온포온천/溫堡溫泉	Kyongsong County	Hot springs	
376	Kyongsong sand Hot Springs 경성모래온천/鏡城모래溫泉	Kyongsong County	Hot springs	
390	Lacebark pine of Kaesŏng 개성백송/開城白松	Yŏngang-ri, Kaep'ung-gun	Tree	Pinus bungeana

=== No.401-No.526 ===
	Name (Korean name)	Location	Description	Scientific name
401	Siberian musk deer of Taehung county 대흥사향노루/大興麝香노루	Taehung County	mammal	Moschus moschiferus
402	Onyang Hot Springs 온양온천/溫陽溫泉	Nyongwon County	Hot springs	
403	Medicinal springs of Geomheung 검흥약수/검흥藥水	Sukchon County	Water	
409	Medicinal springs of Changsung 창성약수/창성藥水	Changsong County	Water	
414	Medicinal springs of Suchon (Sopyong) 수천(서평)약수/수천(서평)藥水	Changsong County	Water	
442	Yangdok Hot Springs 양덕온천/陽德溫泉	Yangdok County	Hot springs	
453	Jongdal Hot Springs 종달온천/종달溫泉	Samchon County	Hot springs	
460	Medicinal springs of Sinjok 신적약수/신적藥水	Jinchon County	Water	
497	Sechon hot springs 세천온천/細川溫泉	Kimchaek	Hot springs	
498	Hwangjin hot springs 황진온천/黃津溫泉	Myongchon County	Hot springs	

=== No.527-No.900 ===
From 527 to 900, no natural monument is designated, and is nothing but a vacant number.

=== No.901-935 ===
	Name (Korean name)	Location	Description	Scientific name
901	Fossil of an ancestral frog 시조개구리화석/始祖개구리化石	Sinuiju	The fossil was found in Sinuiju in 1994.	
902	Swarm of plants of Songchon 성천가지주목풀군락/	Kangso County	plant	
903	Swarm of decidous camellia trees of Yangdok 양덕노각나무군락/	Kangso County	plants	
904	Habitat of winter birds of Mundok County 문덕겨울새살이터/文德겨울새살이터	Mundok County	Birds	
905	Masu salmon of Taehung 대흥산천어/	Kangso County	fish	
906	Songchon hot springs 성천온천/成川溫泉	Songchon County	Hot springs	
907	The Three flower maple tree of Ryoha 료하나도박달나무/	Taegwan County	plant	Acer triflorum
908	Habitat of winter birds of Bidansom 비단섬겨울새살이터/緋緞섬겨울새살이터	Sindo County	Birds	
909	Medicinal springs of Okhodong 옥호동약수/옥호동藥水	Sonchon County	Water	
910	Unsan hot springs 운산온천/雲山溫泉	Unsan County	Hot springs	
911	The empress tree of Haeju 해주참오동나무/	Haeju	plant	Paulownia tomentosa
912	The goldenrain tree of Kangho 강호구슬피나무/	South Hwanghae Province	plant	
913	The persimmon tree of Unchon 은천씨감나무/	Unchon County	plant	
914	The big japanese cedar tree of Ongjin 옹진왕삼나무/	Ongjin County	plant	
915	Habitat of winter birds of Yonan 연안겨울새살이터/延安겨울새살이터	Yonan County	Birds	
916	Water deer of Mt. Kuwol 구월산복작노루/	South Hwanghae Province	animal	
917	Ryongjong wonso 룡정원소/	Kangryong County		
918	Samchon hot springs 삼천온천/	Sinchon County	hot springs	
919	Korean mountain magnolia of Mount Chongbang 정방산목란/	Pongsan County	plant	
920	Chonju waterfalls of Puyon 부연리천주폭포/	Kumya County	waterfalls	
921	Swarm of Five rib thyme of Haechilbo 해칠보백리향군락/	Kyongsong County	plant	Thymus Quinquecostatus
922	Manbyeongcho(Rhododendron aureum) of Mt Paektu 백두산만병초/	Kapsan County	It is 20–50 cm high. The stem lays down and spreads many branches. The nodes are attached with scales that are formed every year. The leaves are alternate, and at the end of the branch, it looks like a pillow attached to it. The leaf body is long-round or inverted, shiny, and the edges are rolled back and dried. It is a thick thick leather. Around June–July, an even inflorescence is formed at the end of the branch, and beautiful pale yellow flowers (about 3 cm in diameter) bloom in clusters. The calyx is very small and the flower cap is bell-shaped and shallowly 5-pronged. 10 male stamens and 1 pistil. The fruit is a long round bouncing fruit and has brown hairs. Propagation is by cuttings or seeds. The leaves contain andromedotoxin, flavonoids, and ursolic acid. Manbyeongcho is planted for ornamental purposes, and the leaves are used as blood pressure lowering drugs and anti-inflammatory drugs. In the private sector, the leaves are eaten for arthritis, joint swelling, and neuralgia. The large manbyeongcho (R. fauriei), a similar species, grows up to 4 to 5 m, and its leaves are used as medicine.	
923	High mountain swamp group of Ganjangneup 간장늪고산습지군락/	Paegam County		
924	The Chongchwi plant(Carpesium abrotanoides Linné) of Taehongdan 대홍단청취/	Taehongdan County	plant	
926	The brother waterfalls of Mt Paektu 백두산형제폭포/白頭山兄弟瀑布	Paektu Mountain		
927	Volcanic rocks of Mt.Paektu 백두산화산탄/白頭山火山炭	Paektu Mountain		
928	Medicinal springs of Chonchon 전천약수/전천藥水	Chonchon County	Water	
929	Medicinal springs of wegwi 외귀약수/외귀藥水	Sijung County	Water	
930	Manchurian fir of Kumgang 금강전나무/	Kosan County	Tree	
931	Seokjeol-li egret and grey heron breeding site 석전리백로왜가리번식지/석전리白鷺왜가리繁殖地	Kosan County	Bird	
932	Asiatic Trout of Pubang and Mayang 부방마양송어/	Trouts that are grown in the Pubang reservoir in Kangwon province. The trout is originally from Mayang reservoir in Musan County, North Hamgyong province.	fish	
933	Chaenomeles speciosa of Kaesong 개성산당화/開城山棠花	Kaesong	FLower	
934	Japanese zelkova tree of Kaepung 개풍느티나무/開豊느티나무	Kaesong(Briefly was administered under Kaepung County)	Tree	Zelkova serrata
935	Habitat of winter birds of West Sea Lock Gate 서해갑문겨울새살이터/西海閘門겨울새살이터	Nampo	Birds	

== See also ==
- Natural monuments of South Korea
- Geography of North Korea
