= Mayang Reservoir =

Reservoir and Important Bird Area in North Korea

- Mayangdong-chosuji (Korean)
- Location within North Korea
- Location: North Hamgyong Province, North Korea
- Coordinates: 42°04′00″N 129°30′00″E
- Type: reservoir
- Surface area: 376 hectares (930 acres)
- Surface elevation: 720 metres (2,360 ft)

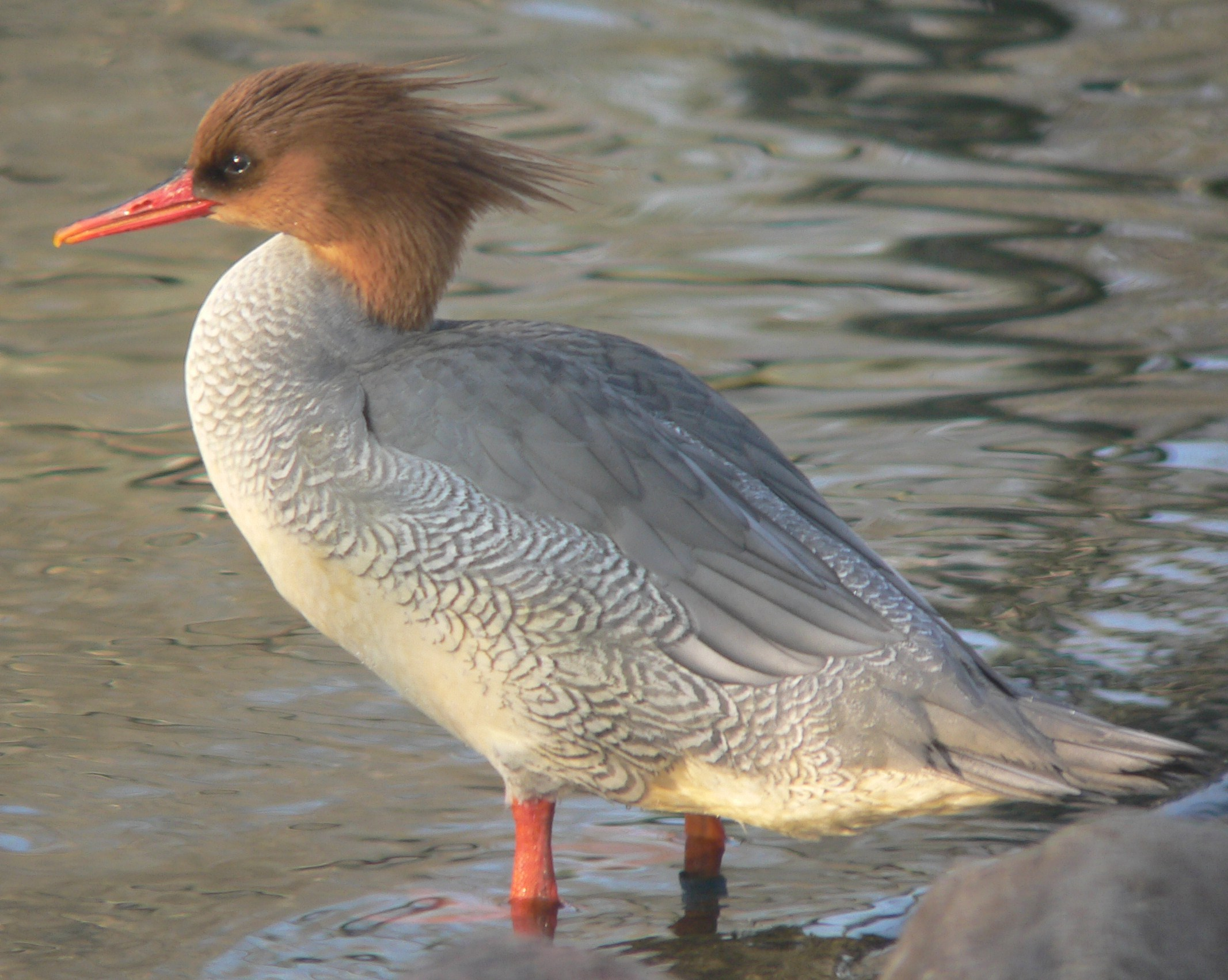
The reservoir is an important site for scaly-sided mergansers

Mayang Reservoir (Korean: 마양저수지Mayangdong-chosuji) is a 376 hectares (930 acres) artificial lake, or reservoir, lying in the mountains of North Hamgyong Province of North Korea at an altitude of 720 metres (2,360 ft) above sea level. It is one of North Korea's designated Natural Monuments and has been identified by BirdLife International as an Important Bird Area (IBA) because it supports a population of endangered scaly-sided mergansers.
