= Rab-do and Muki-do Islands Important Bird Area =

Bird area on the west coast of North Korea

Coordinates: 39°17′00″N 124°43′00″E

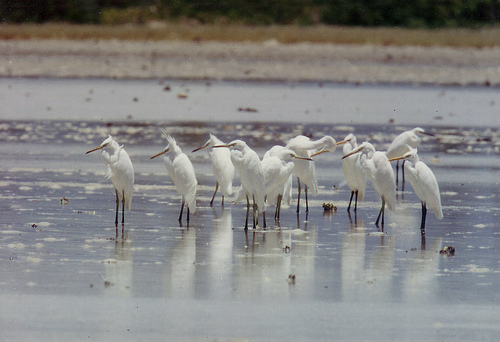
The islands are important for Chinese egrets

The Rab-do and Muki-do Islands Important Bird Area (랍도 묵이도) comprises a group of two small islands, with a collective area of 40 ha, in the north-eastern Yellow Sea, lying close to the western coast of North Korea. The site has been identified by BirdLife International as an Important Bird Area (IBA) because it supports vulnerable Chinese egrets. The site has been designated one of North Korea's Natural Monuments.
