= Sogam-do, Daegam-do, Zung-do, Ae-do and Hyengzedo Islands Important Bird Area =

Coordinates: 39°31′00″N 125°10′00″E

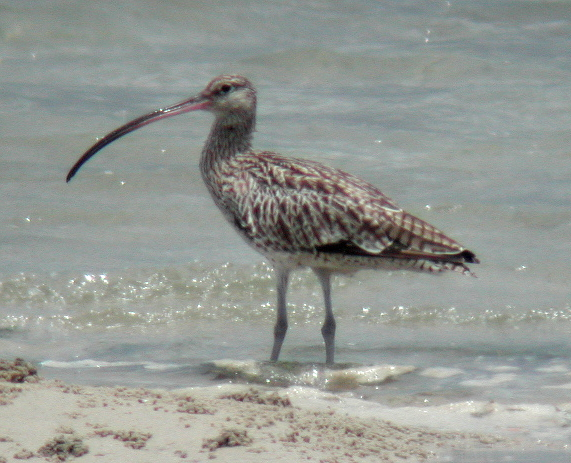
The islands are important as staging sites for vulnerable Far Eastern curlews

The Sogam-do, Daegam-do, Zung-do, Ae-do and Hyengzedo Islands Important Bird Area (소감도 대감도 중도 애도 형제도) comprises a group of small islands, with a collective area of 18 ha, in the north-eastern Yellow Sea, lying close to the western coast of North Korea. The site has been identified by BirdLife International as an Important Bird Area (IBA) because it supports breeding endangered black-faced spoonbills as well as vulnerable Chinese egrets and up to 850 Far Eastern curlews as passage migrants. The site has been designated one of North Korea's Natural Monuments.
