= Anguksa =

Buddhist temple in Pyongsong, North Korea

Coordinates: 39°18′2″N 125°49′35″E

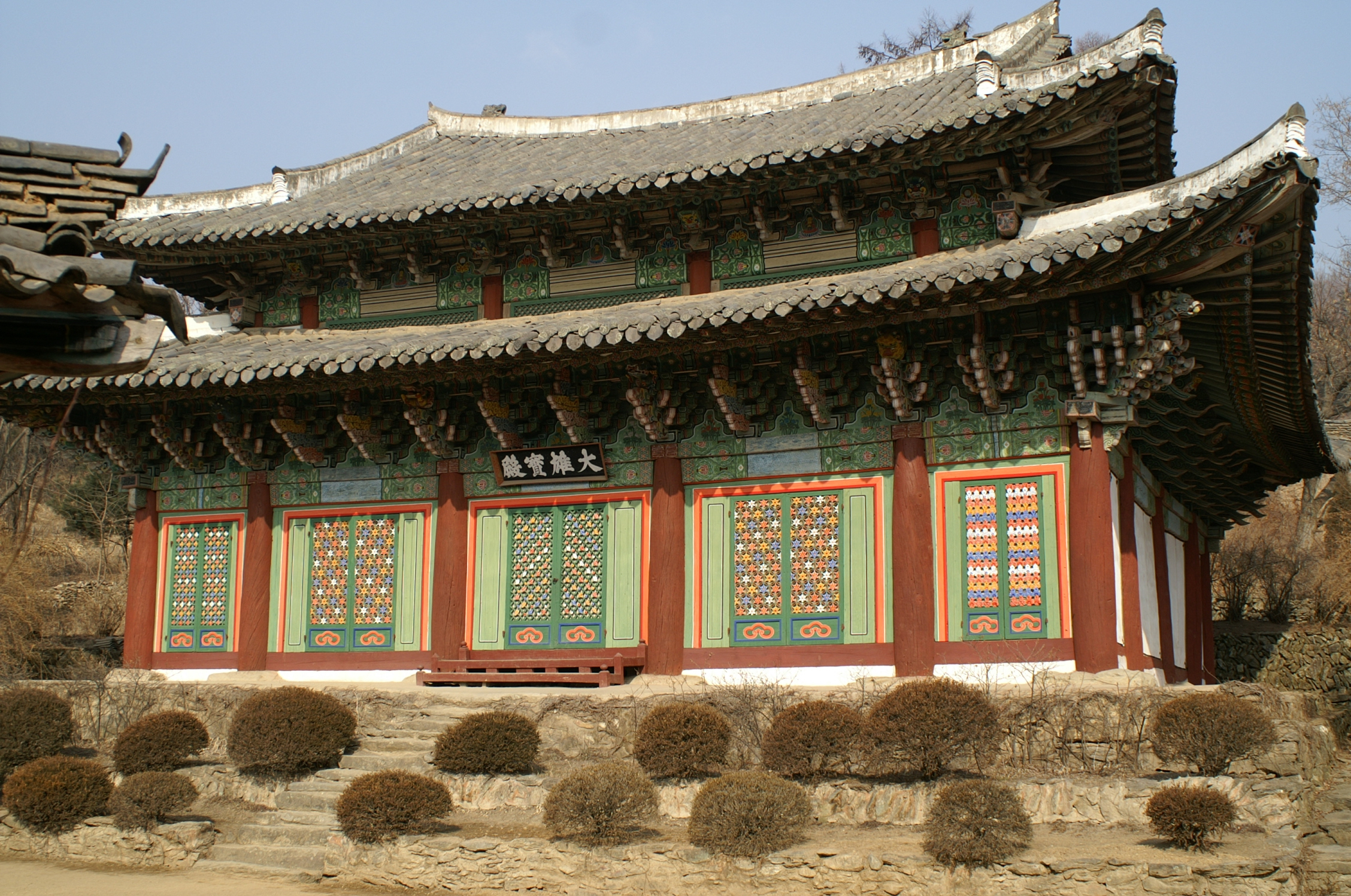
- Taeung Hall, Anguksa

Korean name
- Hangul: 안국사
- Hanja: 安國寺
- RR: Anguksa
- MR: An'guksa

Anguksa (Korean: 안국사) is a Korean Buddhist temple situated in Pyongsong, South Pyongan Province, North Korea. Built on the slopes of Mt. Pongrin, the temple dates to the Koryo dynasty, though all of the buildings date to later Joseon dynasty renovations. The building is registered as National Treasure #34.

== History ==
Anguksa was founded in 503 under Koguryo. It was later reconstructed in 1419, and again renovated in 1785 under king Chŏngjo.

== Architecture ==
The temple has a linear layout. Through the temple's front gate is the outer court, with a monument to the temple's construction and a 9-tiered pagoda dating to the original Koryo temple. The ginkgo tree located in this yard was planted around 1400, and is listed as Living Monument #31.

Access to the temple's inner court is through T'aepyŏng Pavilion (太平樓, "Pavilion of Perfect Peace"), located across from the main gate/Though very simple on the outside, it is ornately painted within. The sighboard of the hall is said to have been painted by King Sunjo of Joseon. Directly across from the pavilion is Taeung Hall (大雄寶殿 "Hall of Great Enlightenment"). As the temple's main prayer hall, Taeung Hall is by far the most impressive of the temple's structures; it is also the largest at 17 by 13 meters long. It has the curious feature of being two-storied in its construction, unlike most other Korean temples of the era, and has two gabled roofs supported by cow's tongue brackets. To the right of Taeung Hall is the temple dormitory; to the left is a library of Buddhist scriptures.
