= Poptong County =

Pŏptong County 법동군
- County

Korean transcription(s)
  - Chosŏn'gŭl: 법동군
  - Hancha: 法洞郡
  - McCune-Reischauer: Pŏptong-gun
  - Revised Romanization: Beopdong-gun
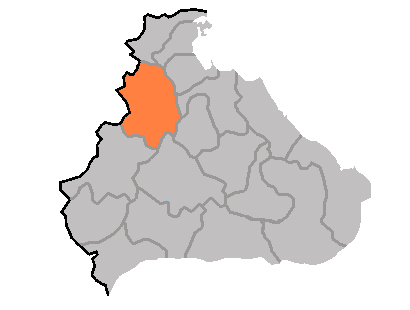
- Map of Kangwon showing the location of Poptong
- Country: North Korea
- Province: Kangwŏn Province
- Administrative divisions: 1 ŭp, 19 ri

Area
  - Total: 841.2 km^{2} (324.8 sq mi)

Population (2008)
  - Total: 35,119
  - Density: 41.75/km^{2} (108.1/sq mi)

Pŏptong County is a kun in the Kangwŏn province, North Korea.

== Geography ==
It lies between the Masingryŏng and Ahobiryŏng ranges, and 90% of the county is more than 400 meters above sea level. The highest point is Turyusan. Only 5% of this rugged county consists of ground level. The chief streams are the Rimjin River, Komitanch'ŏn, and Tongdongch'ŏn (통동천). There are abundant forests. The climate is cold and continental.

The Eurasian otters living in the county are recognized as North Korean natural monument number 249.

== Administrative divisions ==
Pŏptong county is divided into 1 ŭp (town) and 19 ri (villages):

- Pŏptong-ŭp
- Chaktong-ri
- Changal-li
- Ch'uam-ri
- Haerang-ri
- Kamdul-li
- Kŏnja-ri
- Kŭmgu-ri
- Kŭmp'yŏng-ri
- Kuryong-ri
- Majŏl-li
- Ŏyu-ri
- Paeg'il-li
- Rotal-li
- Ryŏngjŏ-ri
- Ryongp'o-ri
- Ryuldong-ri
- Sangsŏ-ri
- Toch'al-li
- Yŏhae-ri

== Economy ==
The local economy is dominated by manufacturing and mining. Goods produced include disposable goods, machines, medicine, chemicals, and paper. The matches manufactured here are sold throughout North Korea. Although only 6.5% of the county's land is arable, the county does produce some maize. Livestock are also raised in the county, which has long been known as a centre for honey production as well.

== Transportation ==
Pŏptong is served by roads, but not by rail.

== See also ==
- Geography of North Korea
- Administrative divisions of North Korea
