= Lake Tungjong and Lake Chonapo Important Bird Area =

Lake in North Korea

Coordinates: 39°07′00″N 127°45′00″E

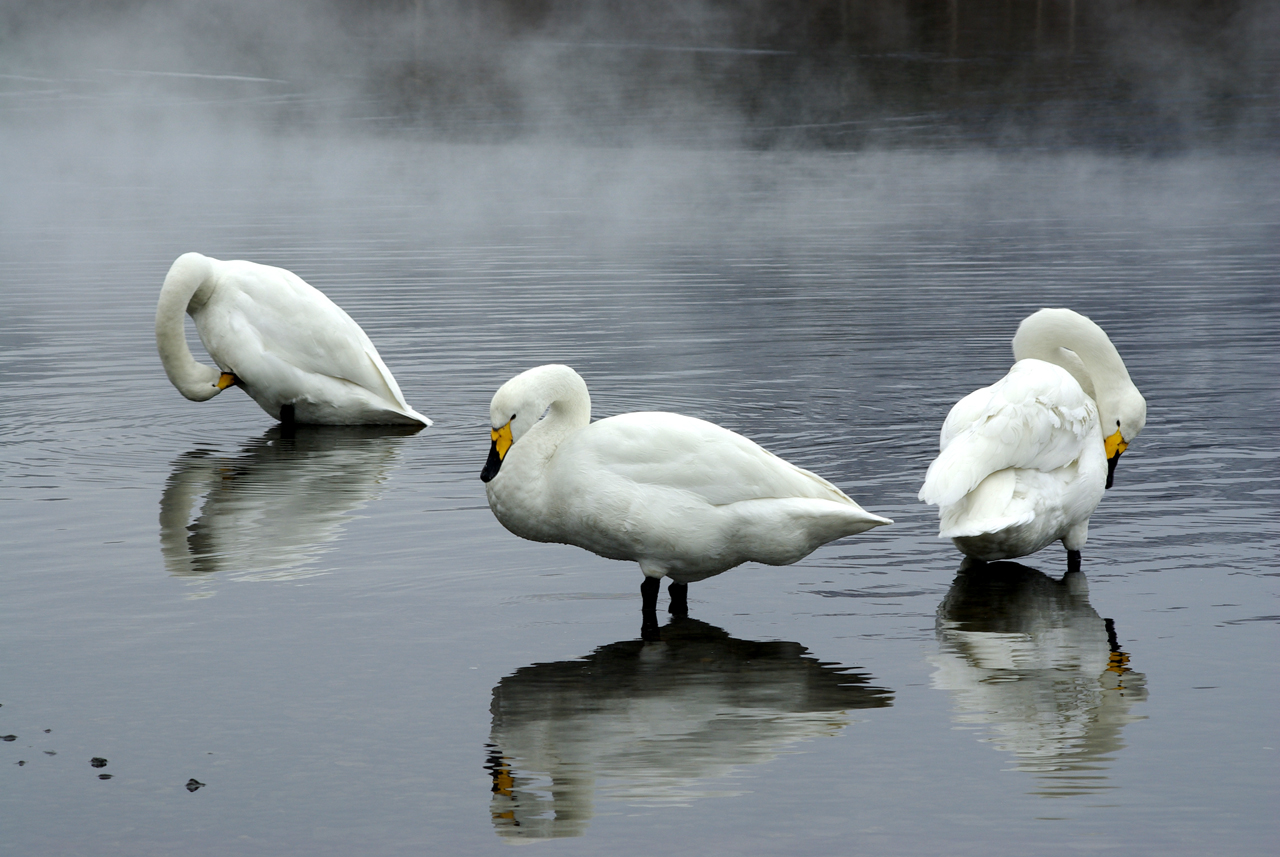
The lakes are important for wintering whooper swans

The Lake Tungjong and Lake Chonapo Important Bird Area (동정호 천아포) is a 2100 ha site lying on the western shore of the Sea of Japan, about 30 km east of the city of Wonsan in north-eastern Kangwon Province in North Korea. Part of it is protected as one of North Korea's designated Natural Monuments. It comprises two coastal lagoons and was identified by BirdLife International as an Important Bird Area (IBA), mainly because it supports populations of wintering water and wetland birds. Species using the site include swan geese, mute swans, whooper swans and red-crowned cranes.
