= Ogasan Nature Reserve =

National park in North Korea

Coordinates: 41°20′00″N 126°54′00″E

- Hangul: 오가산자연보호구
- Hanja: 五佳山自然保護區
- RR: Ogasan jayeon bohogu
- MR: Ogasan chayŏn pohogu

The Ogasan Nature Reserve is a national park located in North Korea. It is situated around Mount Oga, which straddles the borders of Hwap'yŏng county in Chagang Province and Kimhyŏngjik county in Ryanggang.

== Description ==
Rising to 1204 m above sea level, the park covers 6000 ha, including 800 ha of some of the oldest old-growth forest in North Korea, and more than 1330 species of plants and animals. The mountain hosts a diverse variety of plant and animal life, including both boreal and temperate species, which are divided into different zones of broadleaved, mixed and coniferous forests as one ascends the mountain. The site has been identified by BirdLife International as an Important Bird Area (IBA).

Among the varieties of tree found in the park are Mongolian oak, yew, linden, Manchurian fir, Jezo spruce and several varieties of pines. Many of the trees are believed to be centenarians, including a 700-year-old Mongolian oak and a 550-year-old Korean pine; the oldest tree is believed to be a yew, aged at 1100 years. The reserve contains five trees listed as living monuments. There are also many medicinal herbs on the mountain, including asiabell, barrenwort, fatsia, bracken, mountain peony, and anise.
