= Dok-do =

Island in the Yellow Sea

Coordinates: 38°44′57″N 124°58′8″E

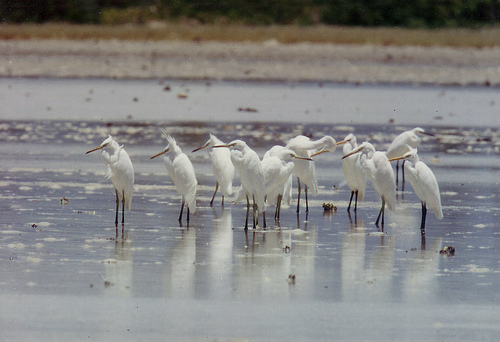
The islands are important as a breeding site for vulnerable Chinese egrets

Dok-do (덕도, 德島) is a small, rocky island in the north-eastern Yellow Sea lying about 15 km off the western coast of North Korea, administered under Onchon County. It rises to a height of 85 m and has an area of 18 ha. Based on surveys conducted in 1997 and 1998, the site has been identified by BirdLife International as an Important Bird Area (IBA) because it supports small numbers of breeding endangered black-faced spoonbills and vulnerable Chinese egrets. The island has been classified as one of the Natural monuments of North Korea, No.37. The main threat to the birds is from human disturbance.
