= Unchon County =

Ŭnch'ŏn County 은천군
- County

Korean transcription(s)
  - Hanja: 銀泉郡
  - McCune-Reischauer: Ŭnch'ŏn-gun
  - Revised Romanization: Euncheon-gun
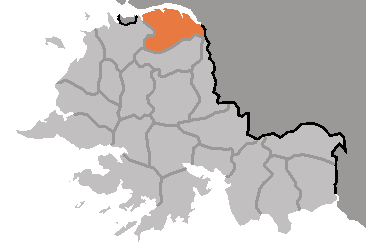
- Country: North Korea
- Province: South Hwanghae Province

Area
  - Total: 457.7 km^{2} (176.7 sq mi)

Population (2008)
  - Total: 95,597
  - Density: 208.9/km^{2} (541.0/sq mi)

Ŭnch'ŏn County is a county in South Hwanghae province, North Korea.

== History ==
The county was formed in 1952 from Unnyul County.

== Administrative divisions ==
Ŭnch'ŏn county is divided into 1 ŭp (town) and 22 ri (villages):

- Ŭnch'ŏn-ŭp
- Al-li
- Chedo-ri
- Chŏngdong-ri
- Ch'ogyo-ri
- Ch'ojŏng-ri
- Ch'ŏngdae-ri
- Hagwŏl-li
- Hakch'ŏl-li
- Madu-ri
- Maehwa-ri
- Namhae-ri
- Namsal-li
- Poktu-ri
- Ryangdam-ri
- Samsal-li
- Sinch'ang-ri
- Songbong-ri
- Tŏkch'ŏl-li
- Tŏkyang-ri
- Tongch'ang-ri
- Ŭnhye-ri
- Yangji-ri
