= Singye County =

Sin'gye County 신계군
- County

Korean transcription(s)
  - Hanja: 新溪郡
  - McCune-Reischauer: Sin’gye-kun
  - Revised Romanization: Singye-gun
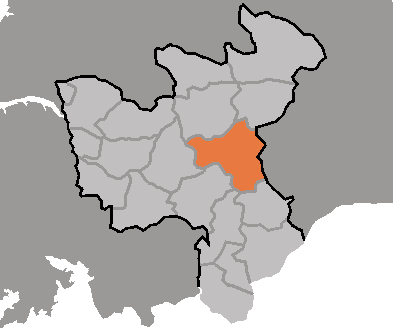
- Map of North Hwanghae showing the location of Singye
- Country: North Korea
- Province: North Hwanghae Province

Area
  - Total: 725.7 km^{2} (280.2 sq mi)

Population (2008)
  - Total: 78,573
  - Density: 108.3/km^{2} (280.4/sq mi)

Sin'gye County is a county in North Hwanghae province, North Korea. It is a mining district with abandoned molybdenum and copper mines. In August 2026 massive floods affected the county.

== Climate ==
Climate data for Singye (1991–2020)
Month	Jan	Feb	Mar	Apr	May	Jun	Jul	Aug	Sep	Oct	Nov	Dec	Year
Mean daily maximum °C (°F)	0.4 (32.7)	3.5 (38.3)	10.1 (50.2)	17.5 (63.5)	23.3 (73.9)	27.3 (81.1)	28.3 (82.9)	29.2 (84.6)	25.8 (78.4)	19.7 (67.5)	10.2 (50.4)	2.1 (35.8)	16.5 (61.7)
Daily mean °C (°F)	−5.2 (22.6)	−2.1 (28.2)	3.9 (39.0)	10.7 (51.3)	16.7 (62.1)	21.5 (70.7)	24.0 (75.2)	24.4 (75.9)	19.6 (67.3)	12.7 (54.9)	4.5 (40.1)	−3.0 (26.6)	10.6 (51.1)
Mean daily minimum °C (°F)	−10.4 (13.3)	−7.4 (18.7)	−1.7 (28.9)	4.3 (39.7)	10.7 (51.3)	16.5 (61.7)	20.5 (68.9)	20.6 (69.1)	14.5 (58.1)	6.6 (43.9)	−0.5 (31.1)	−7.4 (18.7)	5.5 (41.9)
Average precipitation mm (inches)	10.3 (0.41)	16.2 (0.64)	23.3 (0.92)	45.3 (1.78)	87.7 (3.45)	99.1 (3.90)	314.6 (12.39)	272.2 (10.72)	89.9 (3.54)	38.0 (1.50)	39.8 (1.57)	17.2 (0.68)	1,053.6 (41.48)
Average precipitation days (≥ 0.1 mm)	3.9	3.7	4.3	5.8	7.2	8.1	12.7	11.0	5.7	3.9	6.3	5.8	78.4
Average snowy days	3.9	3.0	1.3	0.2	0.0	0.0	0.0	0.0	0.0	0.0	1.3	4.2	13.9
Average relative humidity (%)	68.1	65.4	65.0	62.7	68.7	73.9	84.2	83.0	77.0	71.7	73.3	70.2	71.9
Source: Korea Meteorological Administration

== Administrative divisions ==
Sin'gye county is divided into 1 ŭp (town) and 27 ri (villages):

- Sin'gye-ŭp
- Chisŏng-ri
- Chŏngbong-ri
- Chuch'ŏl-li
- Chungsal-li
- Ch'imgyo-ri
- Ch'ŏn'gae-ri
- Ch'ŏn'gong-ri
- Haep'o-ri
- Hwasŏng-ri
- Hwaya-ri
- Kamu-ri
- Kŭmsŏng-ri
- Masal-li
- Paekkong-ri
- Puyong-ri
- Rŭngsu-ri
- Sajŏng-ri
- Sinhŭng-ri
- Sinsŏng-ri
- Taejŏng-ri
- Taep'yŏng-ri
- Taesŏng-ri
- T'aeŭl-li
- Ŭnjŏm-ri
- Wangdang-ri
- Wŏn'gyo-ri

== Transport ==
Sin'gye county is served by three stations on the Ch'ŏngnyŏn Ich'ŏn line of the Korean State Railway.
