= Unmu-do =

Island in North Korea

Coordinates: 39°24′45″N 125°07′05″E

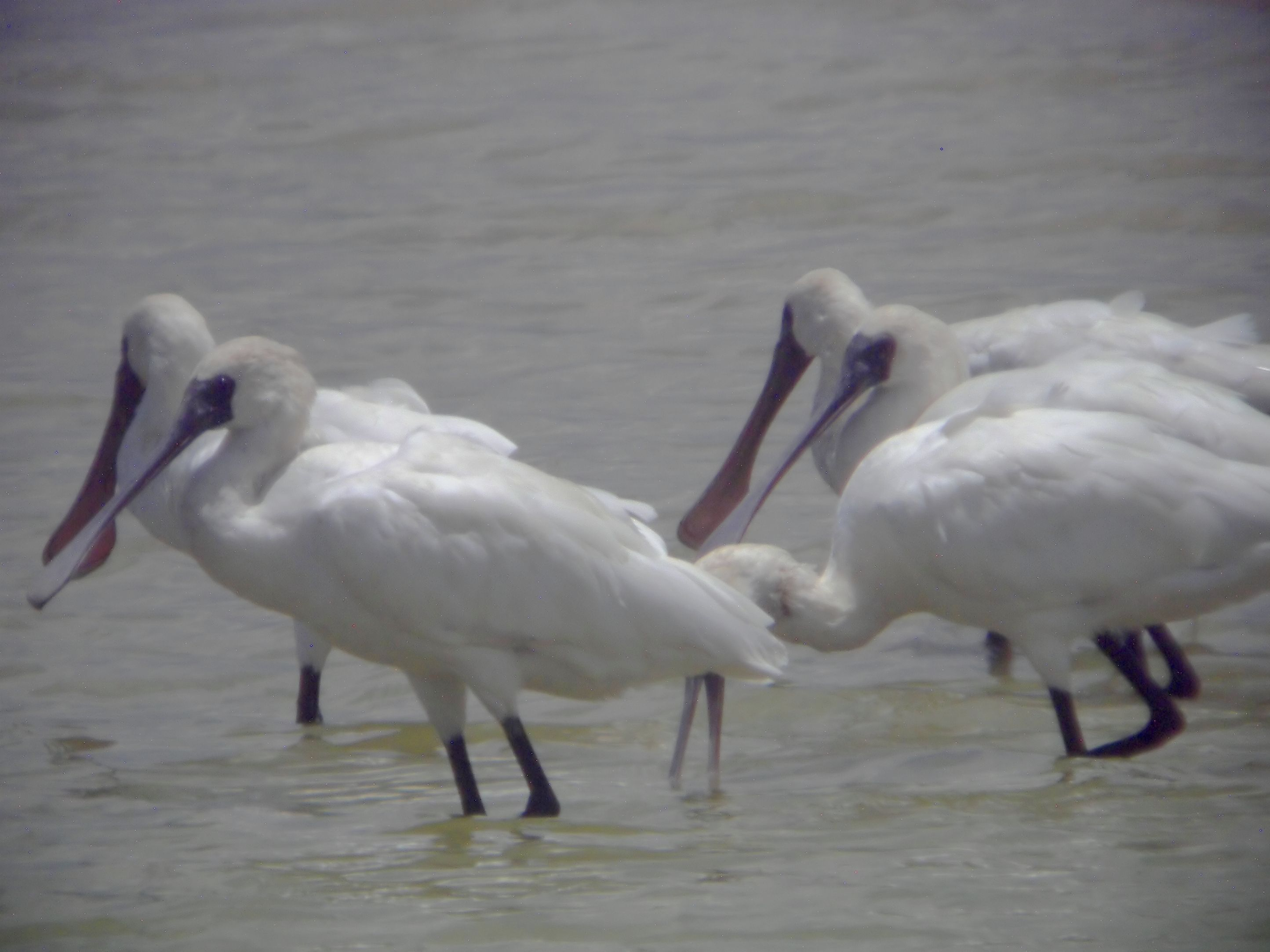
The island is important for endangered black-faced spoonbills

Unmu-do is an 80 ha island in the north-eastern Yellow Sea lying about 19 km off the western coast of North Korea. The site has been identified by BirdLife International as an Important Bird Area (IBA) because it supports endangered black-faced spoonbills.
