= Sinwon County =

Coordinates: 38°14′09″N 125°45′40″E

Sinwŏn County 신원군
- County

Korean transcription(s)
  - Hanja: 新院郡
  - McCune-Reischauer: Sinwŏn-gun
  - Revised Romanization: Sinwon-gun
- Interactive map of Sinwŏn County
- Country: North Korea
- Province: South Hwanghae Province

Area
  - Total: 492.5 km^{2} (190.2 sq mi)

Population (2008)
  - Total: 83,161
  - Density: 168.9/km^{2} (437.3/sq mi)

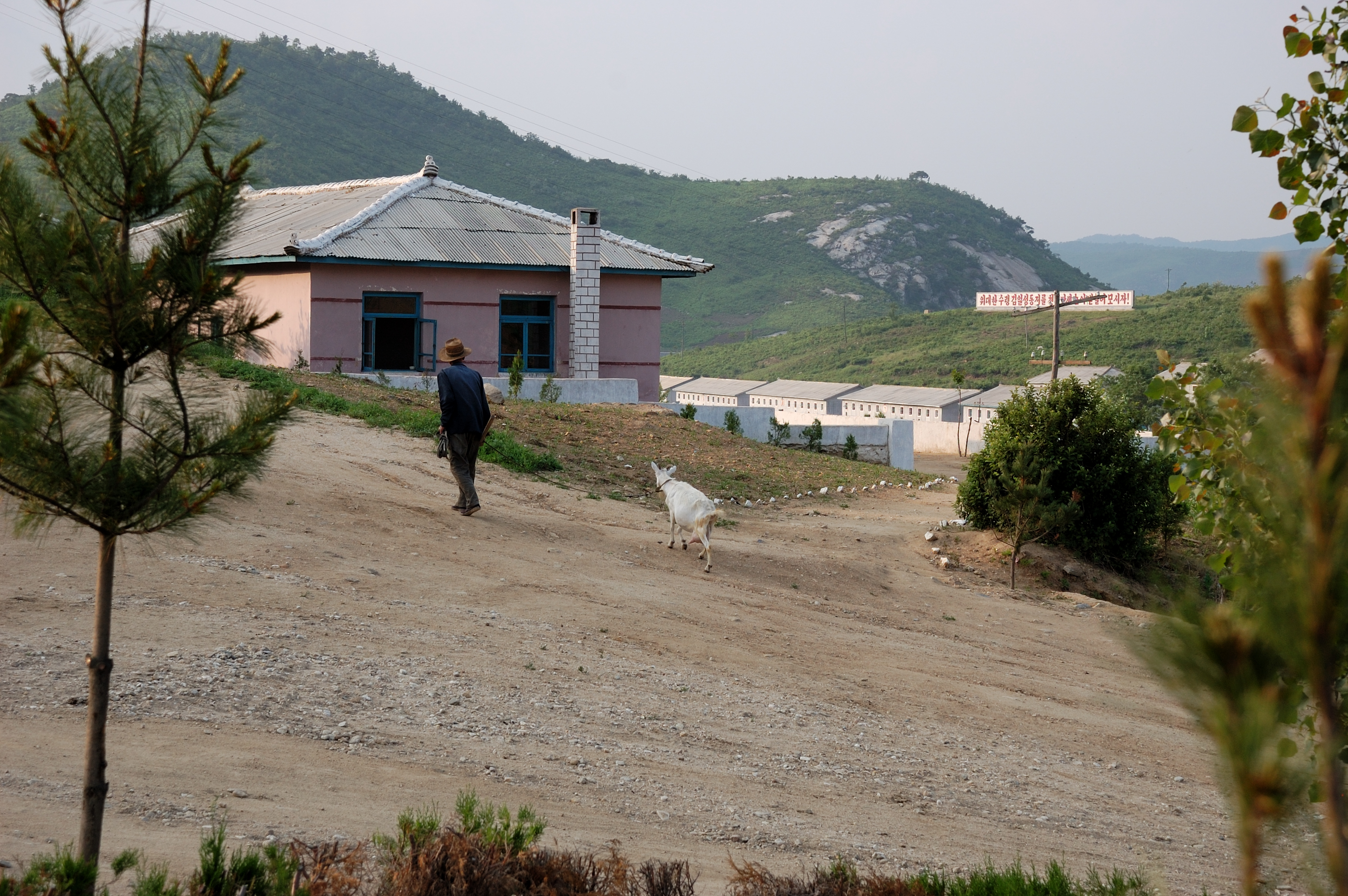
A farm in Kyenam-ri, Sinwŏn county.

Sinwŏn County is a county in South Hwanghae province, North Korea.

== Administrative divisions ==
Sinwŏn county is divided into 1 ŭp (town), 1 rodongjagu (workers' district) and 18 ri (villages):

- Sinwŏn-ŭp
- Hasŏng-rodongjagu
- Ayang-ri
- Chaha-ri
- Changgŭm-ri
- Ch'ŏngsŏktu-ri
- Hwasŏng-ri
- Karyŏ-ri
- Kŏmch'ol-li
- Kyenam-ri
- Muhang-ri
- Paeg'u-ri
- Ryŏngwŏl-li
- Ryulla-ri
- Sinch'ang-ri
- Sindŏng-ri
- Suwŏl-li
- Un'yang-ri
- Wŏldang-ri
- Yŏmt'al-li

== Transportation ==
Sinwŏn county is served by the Hwanghae Ch'ŏngnyŏn Line of the Korean State Railway.
