= Haeju rakusam =

Individual tree

The Haeju rakusam is a tree of the species Taxodium distichum, growing in Haeju, South Hwanghae Province of North Korea. The tree is believed to have been planted in 1931. It is 21.3m tall, with a crown width of 7.3m, growing straight with a red-brown bark. It was listed as living monument of North Korea No. 125 in February 1980.
