= Pongchon County =

Pongch'ŏn County 봉천군
- County

Korean transcription(s)
  - Hanja: 峯泉郡
  - McCune-Reischauer: Pongch'ŏn-gun
  - Revised Romanization: Bongcheon-gun
- Interactive map of Pongch'ŏn County
- Country: North Korea
- Province: South Hwanghae Province

Area
  - Total: 503.2 km^{2} (194.3 sq mi)

Population (2008)
  - Total: 79,740
  - Density: 158.5/km^{2} (410.4/sq mi)

Pongch'ŏn County (Pongch'ŏn-gun) is located in South Hwanghae Province, North Korea. Formerly known as P'yŏngch'ŏn County (平川郡), this county was split from P'yŏngsan County in 1952. In 1990, it was given its current name.

== Administrative divisions ==
Pongch'ŏn county is divided into 1 ŭp (town) and 22 ri (villages):

- Pongch'ŏn-ŭp
- Chudap-ri
- Chuktong-ri
- Haengjŏng-ri
- Hanch'ol-li
- Hanjŏng-ri
- Hwach'ol-li
- Hwangryong-ri
- Kadong-ri
- Kundong-ri
- Kwangam-ri
- Pongam-ri
- Ruch'ŏl-li
- Ryongch'ol-li
- Sindap-ri
- Sinmyŏng-ri
- Sŏksa-ri
- Sŏnggi-ri
- Songjŏng-ri
- Taea-ri
- Taeryong-ri
- Ŭngch'ŏl-li
- Yŏnhŭng-ri
