= Yangdok County =

Yangdŏk County 양덕군
- County

Korean transcription(s)
  - Chosŏn'gŭl: 양덕군
  - Hancha: 陽德郡
  - McCune-Reischauer: Yangdŏk-kun
  - Revised Romanization: Yangdeok-gun
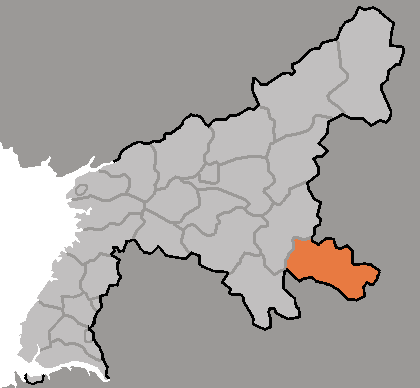
- Map of South Pyongan showing the location of Yangdok
- Country: North Korea
- Province: South P'yŏngan
- Administrative divisions: 1 ŭp, 18 ri

Area
  - Total: 772 km^{2} (298 sq mi)

Population (2008)
  - Total: 61,355
  - Density: 79.5/km^{2} (206/sq mi)

Yangdŏk County is a kun (county) in South P'yŏngan province, North Korea.

== History ==
The region is thought to be near the ancient chiefdom of dongye. Biryuguk used to be in the region. It was incorporated into Goguryeo around 40 BC.

== Climate ==
Climate data for Yangdok (1991–2020)
Month	Jan	Feb	Mar	Apr	May	Jun	Jul	Aug	Sep	Oct	Nov	Dec	Year
Mean daily maximum °C (°F)	−1.3 (29.7)	1.9 (35.4)	8.3 (46.9)	16.1 (61.0)	22.6 (72.7)	26.3 (79.3)	27.6 (81.7)	28.2 (82.8)	24.3 (75.7)	17.8 (64.0)	8.5 (47.3)	0.4 (32.7)	15.1 (59.2)
Daily mean °C (°F)	−8.1 (17.4)	−4.4 (24.1)	2.0 (35.6)	9.0 (48.2)	15.4 (59.7)	20.0 (68.0)	23.0 (73.4)	23.1 (73.6)	17.6 (63.7)	10.3 (50.5)	2.7 (36.9)	−5.1 (22.8)	8.8 (47.8)
Mean daily minimum °C (°F)	−14.2 (6.4)	−10.6 (12.9)	−3.9 (25.0)	1.9 (35.4)	8.4 (47.1)	14.4 (57.9)	19.1 (66.4)	19.1 (66.4)	12.2 (54.0)	3.9 (39.0)	−2.7 (27.1)	−10.4 (13.3)	3.1 (37.6)
Average precipitation mm (inches)	9.4 (0.37)	15.4 (0.61)	25.7 (1.01)	48.7 (1.92)	80.0 (3.15)	117.8 (4.64)	275.8 (10.86)	231.3 (9.11)	94.2 (3.71)	46.6 (1.83)	41.5 (1.63)	19.6 (0.77)	1,006 (39.61)
Average precipitation days (≥ 0.1 mm)	4.8	4.7	5.4	7.2	8.2	9.2	13.3	11.3	6.6	5.2	7.5	6.9	90.3
Average snowy days	5.5	4.1	3.2	0.9	0.0	0.0	0.0	0.0	0.0	0.1	2.1	5.9	21.8
Average relative humidity (%)	75.9	72.4	69.9	65.1	67.2	73.8	81.6	82.0	78.2	75.7	77.4	77.4	74.7
Source: Korea Meteorological Administration

== Administrative divisions ==
Yangdŏk County is divided into one ŭp (town) and 18 ri (villages):

- Yangdŏk-ŭp (양덕읍)
- Ch'uma-ri (추마리)
- Ilgam-ri (일감리)
- Kŏsang-ri (거상리)
- Kuryong-ri (구룡리)
- Onjŏng-ri (온정리)
- Ponggye-ri (봉계리)
- Ryongam-ri (룡암리)
- Ryongp'yŏng-ri (룡평리)
- Sagi-ri (사기리)
- Samgye-ri (삼계리)
- Sangsil-li (상신리)
- Sangsŏng-ri (상성리)
- Sudŏng-ri (수덕리)
- T'aehŭng-ri (태흥리)
- Tongyang-ri (동양리)
- T'ongdong-ri (통동리)
- Unch'ang-ri (운창리)
- Ŭnha-ri (은하리)

== Transportation ==
Yangdŏk county is served by Yangdŏk Station on the Korean State Railway's P'yŏngra Line.

== Yangdok Hot Springs Tourist Area ==
In 2019, Yangdok Hot Springs Tourist Area was a key construction project, built on the site of Yangdok Recreation Center which opened in 1947. It was opened by Kim Jong-un on 7 December 2019. It featured indoor and outdoor baths, a ski slope, and a horse-riding park.
