= Posan =

Posan may refer to:

- Posan Line, a railway line in North Korea
  - Posan station, terminus of the Posan Line
- László Pósán (born 1965), Hungarian historian and politician
