= Prisons in North Korea =

Prisons in North Korea have come under immense scrutiny for poor living and working conditions. A significant number of inmates perish every year, many of whom are subjected to torture and inhumane treatment. Public and secret executions of inmates, including children, especially in cases of attempted escape, are commonplace. Infanticides are also a frequent occurrence. The mortality rate is exceptionally high, because many prisoners die of starvation, illnesses, work accidents, or torture. Thus, some critics compare North Korean prison camps to historic concentration camps and Gulags.

During the height of the North Korean famine, the government's response was to set up many low-level labor camps for those who were caught crossing the North Korean-Chinese border or were repatriated from China. These labor training facilities were also used in response to the black market activity that resulted in people searching for food throughout the countryside.

In 2004, these “labor training” facilities were made a regular form of punishment under the new reforms of the criminal code which included a list of economic and social crimes. This list was increased in 2007 with the corresponding punishments growing.

The DPRK government denies all allegations of human rights violations in prison camps, claiming that this is prohibited by criminal procedure law, but former prisoners testify that there are completely different rules in the prison camps. The DPRK government has released no information on inmates or prison camps and has not allowed access to any human rights organizations. According to a North Korean defector, North Korea considered inviting a delegation of the UN Commission on Human Rights to visit the Yodok prison camp in 1996.

North Korean prison camps are of two types: large internment camps for political prisoners (Kwan-li-so) and reeducation prison camps (Kyo-hwa-so).

== Internment camps for political prisoners ==
Political prison camps in North Korea

Map of the location of political prison camps (kwanliso) and ordinary prison camps (kyohwaso) in North Korea. Map issued in 2014 by the Commission of Inquiry on Human Rights in the DPRK, under the United Nations Human Rights Council.

The internment camps for people who are accused of political offences and people who are accused of being politically unreliable are run by the State Security Department.

Reports by refugees also indicate that all religious activities are considered illegal; offenders are frequently arrested and sent to political prison camps. Refugees reported that people were subjected to arrests and disappearances for owning Bibles.

Political prisoners were historically subjected to the family responsibility principle, in which the immediate family members of convicted political criminals were also regarded as political criminals and interned. However, in 1994 the family responsibility principle was limited to cases of crimes perceived by the government to be especially severe, such as writing anti-government graffiti, which represented a substantial improvement by North Korean standards.

According to former guards who have defected from North Korea, in the event of the Kim Family Regime's collapse or in the event of another crisis in North Korea, they were ordered to kill all political prisoners. The immediate murder of approximately 120,000 North Korean political prisoners would constitute a genocide.

The internment camps are located in central and northeastern North Korea. They consist of many prison labour colonies in secluded mountain valleys, completely isolated from the outside world. The total number of prisoners who are incarcerated in the camps is estimated to range from 80,000 to 200,000. Yodok camp and Pukchang camp are separated into two sections: One section for political prisoners who are in lifelong detention, another section which is similar to re-education camps with prisoners who are sentenced to long-term imprisonment which ranges from 5 to 20 years.

The prisoners are forced to perform hard and dangerous slave work with primitive means in mining and agriculture. The food rations are very small, causing the prisoners to constantly be on the brink of starvation. Along with the hard work, the small food rations cause a huge number of the prisoners to die. It is estimated that 40% of the prisoners die from malnutrition.

Moreover, many prisoners are crippled from work accidents, frostbite or torture. Additionally, a rigid punishment regimen exists in the camps. Prisoners who work too slowly and prisoners who do not obey orders are beaten or tortured. In cases when one prisoner is accused of stealing food or attempting to escape, the other prisoners are publicly executed.

Initially, there were around twelve political prison camps, but some of them were merged or closed (e.g. Onsong prison camp, Kwan-li-so No. 12, following a suppressed riot with around 5,000 dead people in 1987). Today there are six political prison camps in North Korea, with the size determined from satellite images and the number of prisoners estimated by former prisoners and NGOs. Most of the camps are documented in testimonies of former prisoners.

Lee Soon-ok gave detailed testimony on her treatment in the North Korean prison system to the United States Senate Committee on the Judiciary in 2002. In her statement she said, "I testify that most of the 6,000 prisoners who were there when I arrived in 1987 had quietly perished under the harsh prison conditions by the time I was released in 1992." Many other former inmates, including Kang Chol-hwan and Shin Dong-hyuk, gave detailed and consistent testimonies on the human rights crimes in North Korean prison camps.

According to the testimony of former camp guard Ahn Myong-chol of Camp 22, the guards are trained to treat the detainees as subhumans. He gave an account of children in one camp who were fighting over corn retrieved from cow dung.

=== Repatriation ===
During the height of the famine in the mid to late 1990s, thousands of North Koreans crossed the border into China in search of food or jobs to support their families back home. The Chinese government, fearful of the North Korean government's response, repatriated the North Korean refugees back to their country. The North Korean border police often tortured North Koreans who were forcibly repatriated, but at the time, the government stated that the repatriated citizens would be treated fairly. If it was determined that those who fled to China had any contact with South Koreans or Protestant Christian organizations, they were sent to labor colonies or gyohwaso (felony-level penitentiaries).

=== Camps ===
Political Prison Camp	Official Name	Location	Prisoners	Comments	Current Status
Kyongsong Political Prison Camp	Kwan-li-so No. 11	Kyŏngsŏng County, North Hamgyong	20,000	Closed in order to convert the area into a villa for Kim Il Sung.	Closed since 1990
Onsong Political Prison Camp	Kwan-li-so No. 12	Onsong, North Hamgyong	15,000	Site of a prisoner riot where 5,000 prisoners rioted and either all or only a third were killed.	Closed since 1989
Chongsong Political Prison Camp	Kwan-li-so No. 13	Chongsŏng, North Hamgyong	20,000	Approximately 20,000 prisoners were relocated after fears that the camp was located too close to the Chinese border.	Closed since 1990
Kaechon Political Prison Camp	Kwan-li-so No. 14	Kaechon, South Pyongan	15,000	Shin Dong-hyuk testimony	Currently open and possibly being expanded
Yodok Political Prison Camp	Kwan-li-so No. 15	Yodok County, South Hamgyong	50,000	Kang Chol-hwan testimony	Closed since 2014
Hwasong Political Prison Camp	Kwan-li-so No. 16	Hwasong County, North Hamgyong	20,000	Close proximity to the Punggye-ri Nuclear Test Site.	Currently open
Toksong Political Prison Camp	Kwan-li-so No. 17	Toksong County, South Hamgyong	30,000-40,000	Approximately 30,000-40,000 prisoners were relocated to help develop a mine in Kwan-li-so No. 18.	Closed since 1984
Pukchang Political Prison Camp	Kwan-li-so No. 18	Pukchang County, South Pyongan	30,000	Kim Yong testimony	Either reopened with a new security perimeter or now merged with camp 14.
Tanchon concentration camp	Kwan-li-so No. 19	Tanchon, South Pyongan	10,000	Closed to decrease the amount of prison camps.	Closed since 1990
Tanchon concentration camp	Kwan-li-so No. 21	Tanchon, South Pyongan	10,000	According to a report by the National Intelligence Service (NIS) of South Korea in 2009, the camp was labeled as Camp 21 but its closure and location coincide with Camp 19, meaning they are the same camp.	Closed since 1990
Hoeryong Political Prison Camp	Kwan-li-so No. 22	Hoeryong, North Hamgyong	50,000	Ahn Myong-chol testimony	Closed since 2012
Toksong Political Prison Camp	Kwan-li-so No. 23	Toksong County, South Hamgyong	10,000	All prisoners were released in 1987, with the camp eventually becoming a prison under police control.	Closed since 1987
Tongsin Political Prison Camp	Kwan-li-so No. 24	Tongsin, Chagang Province	17,000		Closed since 1990
Chongjin Political Prison Camp	Kwan-li-so No. 25	Chongjin, North Hamgyong	5,000	Jin Gyeong-suk was abducted from China and was reportedly taken to camp 25.	Currently open
Sunghori Political Prison Camp	Kwan-li-so No. 26	Sŭngho, Pyongyang			Closed since 1991
Chonma Political Prison Camp	Kwan-li-so No. 27	Ch'ŏnma, North Hamgyong	15,000		Closed since 1991

=== Accounts ===
The South Korean journalist Kang Chol-hwan is a former prisoner of Yodok Political Prison Camp and has written a book, The Aquariums of Pyongyang, about his time in the camp. The South Korean human rights activist Shin Dong-hyuk is the only person known to have escaped from Kaechon Political Prison Camp. He gave an account of his time in the camp.

== Reeducation camps ==
Reeducation camps in North Korea
(18 out of around 30 - 35)

The reeducation camps for criminals are run by the Ministry of Social Security. There is a fluent passage between common crimes and political crimes, as people who get on the bad side of influential party members are often denounced on false accusations. They are then forced into false confessions with brutal torture in detention centers (Lee Soon-ok for example had to kneel down whilst being showered with water at icy temperatures with other prisoners, of whom six did not survive) and are then condemned in a brief show trial to a long-term prison sentence.

In North Korea, political crimes are greatly varied, from border crossing to any disturbance of the political order, and they are rigorously punished. Due to the dire prison conditions with hunger and torture, a large percentage of prisoners do not survive their sentence terms.

One account of a North Korean refugee recalls being kicked repeatedly in the stomach by her North Korean guard in an attempt to abort her 5-month-old unborn baby. After losing consciousness during the beatings, she awoke inside the camp's clinic where her baby was forcibly removed.

The reeducation camps are large prison building complexes surrounded by high walls. The situation of prisoners is quite similar to that in the political prison camps. They have to perform slave labour in prison factories and in case they do not meet the work quotas, they are tortured and (at least in Kaechon camp) confined for many days in special prison cells, which are too small for them to stand up or lie full-length in.

To be distinguished from the internment camps for political prisoners, the reeducation camp prisoners are forced to undergo ideological instruction after work and they are also forced to memorize the speeches of Kim Il Sung and Kim Jong Il and they even have to undergo self-criticism rites. Many prisoners are guilty of common crimes which are also penalized in other countries e. g. illegal border crossing, stealing food or illegal trading.

There are around 15 to 25 reeducation camps in North Korea.

In April 2025 it was reported that a new prison is built in Hwangju County at 38°39′46″N 125°43′28″E. In July 2025 it was reported that Hamhung Prison had undergone dismantlement and construction. Construction of new structures in Kyohwaso No. 11 was also documented. In addition, construction of a new structure in the form of x-shape was documented in a prison in Songgan County located at 40°48′54″N 126°31′57″E.

=== Camps ===
Reeducation Camp	Official Name	Location	Prisoners	Comments	Current Status
Kaechon Reeducation Camp	Kyo-hwa-so No. 1	Kaechon, South Pyongan	6,000	Lee Soon-ok testimony	Currently open
Tongrim Reeducation Camp	Kyo-hwa-so No. 2	Tongrim County, North Pyongan	Unknown	Was listed by the 2011 NKDB Report, and 2014 & 2016 NKDB KINU listings, but its current status of operation is currently unknown.	Currently unknown
Sinuiju Reeducation Camp	Kyo-hwa-so No. 3	Sinuiju, North Pyongan	2,500	Near Chinese border	Currently open
Kangdong Reeducation Camp	Kyo-hwa-so No. 4	Kangdong, Pyongyang	7,000	30 km (19 mi) from Pyongyang	Currently open
Kangwon Reeducation Camp	Kyo-hwa-so No. 5	Kangwon, North Korea	Unknown	Mentioned in the 2014 KINU list of prison camps. No other information is available on Kyo-hwa-so No. 5.	Currently unknown
Sariwon Reeducation camp	Kyo-hwa-so No. 6	Sariwon, North Hwanghae	4,000	Translators Ali Lameda and Jacques Sedillot were imprisoned in this camp until Amnesty International intervened on their behalf for their eventual release from the camp.	Currently open
Kanggye Reeducation camp	Kyo-hwa-so No. 7	Kanggye, Chagang	Unknown		Currently unknown
Ryongdam Reeducation Camp	Kyo-hwa-so No. 8	Wonsan, Kangwŏn	3,000		Currently open
Hamhung Reeducation Camp	Kyo-hwa-so No. 9	Hamhung, South Hamgyong	500	Former colonial prison	Currently open
Yongdam Reeducation Camp	Kyo-hwa-so No. 10	Wonsan, Kangwŏn	Unknown	The 2014 KINU listing mentions that Kyo-hwa-so No. 10 was absorbed into Kyo-hwa-so No. 8, but there is other information on this camp under this numerical designation.	Closed
Chungsan Reeducation Camp	Kyo-hwa-so No. 11	Chungsan County, South Pyongan	3,300	Many repatriated defectors	Currently open
Chongori Reeducation Camp	Kyo-hwa-so No. 12	Hoeryong, North Hamgyong	2,000	Many repatriated defectors	Currently open
Oro Reeducation Camp	Kyo-hwa-so No. 22	Yonggwang County, South Hamgyong	6,000	Said to have been closed around 2008	Most likely closed
Cheonma Reeducation Camp	Kyo-hwa-so No. 55	Ch'ŏnma, North Pyongan	Unknown	Said to have been very overcrowded and most prisoners were sent to Camp No. 77. Its current state of operation is unknown.	Currently unknown
Tanchon concentration camp	Kyo-hwa-so No. 77	Tanchon, South Hamgyong	6,000	Said to have been closed around 1997	Closed
Wonsan Reeducation Camp	Kyo-hwa-so No. 88	Wonsan, Kangwŏn	Unknown		Currently open
Hoeryong Reeducation Camp	Kyo-hwa-so	Hoeryong, North Hamgyong	1,500	This camp may have been subsequently termed by its more precise location and name, Kyo-hwa-so No. 12, or closed	Currently unknown
Sunghori Reeducation Camp	Kyo-hwa-so No. 8	Pyongyang, North Hwanghae	2,000	The original Sunghori concentration camp closed and was relocated to its new, current location	Currently open

Kyo-hwa-so Sunghori was closed in 1991 but was later reopened at a new location on an unknown date.

In April 2025 it was reported that a new prison is built in Hwangju County at 38°39′46″N 125°43′28″E.

=== Accounts ===
The South Korean human rights activist Lee Soon-ok has written a book (Eyes of the Tailless Animals: Prison Memoirs of a North Korean Woman) about her time in the camp and testified before the US Senate.

TIME magazine article, Running out of Darkness, reports on the efforts of Kim Myong-suk to escape a North Korean prison with the help of a South Korean-based charity, Helping Hands Korea.

== "Resort" prison ==
In December 2016, the South China Morning Post reported on the existence of a secret prison in Hyanghari, which is euphemistically known as a "resort", where members of the country's political elite are imprisoned.

== See also ==
- Kwanliso
- Gulag
- Year Zero
- Democratic Kampuchea (DK)
- Angkar (The Organization)
- Criticism of communist states
- History of North Korea
- Human rights in North Korea
- List of concentration and internment camps#Korea, Democratic People's Republic of
- Mass killings under communist states
