= Kangdong Residence =

Residence of Kim Jong Un

Coordinates: 39°12′05″N 126°01′14″E

- Hangul: 강동 관저
- Hanja: 江東官邸
- RR: Gangdong gwanjeo
- MR: Kangdong kwanjŏ

Location of Kangdong Residence in North Korea

Kangdong Residence is the summer residence and second residence of the North Korean leader Kim Jong Un after Ryongsong Residence.

== Location ==
The residence is located in Kangdong-gun, a suburban county of Pyongyang, around 30 km (19 mi) northeast of Kim Il Sung Square. Taedong River is just 1 km (0.62 mi) to the north. The size of the whole leadership complex is around 4 km^{2} (1.5 sq mi). According to Kim Jong Il's former bodyguard Lee Young-kuk there are at least eight North Korean leader's residences outside Pyongyang.

== Description ==
The compound was constructed in the 1980s and expanded in the 1990s under the order of Kim Jong Il. It contains buildings for Kim Jong Il, his late wife Ko Yong Hui, his sister Kim Kyong-hui and his brother-in-law Jang Sung-taek. The area is mostly used as a summer residence, to spend holidays or for parties with close officials. The estate has an elaborate garden, set around many lakes. There are numerous guest houses, and a banqueting hall. The whole compound is a maximum security area, surrounded by two armored fence lines with guards huts and checkpoints, clearly visible on satellite pictures. Kim Jong Il's former cook Kenji Fujimoto worked and lived in a guest house within the compound and provided some photographs dated 1989. Analysis of satellite pictures showed that the area changed significantly since then and even after 2006 new buildings and a new railway station were established. Defectors reported that in Hyangmok-ri, not far from the residence and from the Mausoleum of Tangun, Kim Jong Un's birthplace is being built, though he was actually born in Changsong, North Pyongan Province.

== Facilities ==
The residence has many facilities for entertainment of the residents and their families :

- Furnished entertainment facilities with bowling, shooting center and roller-skating slope
- Horse stables and a racing track
- Football field

Kangdong airfield is 4 km (2.5 mi) south.

== See also ==
- North Korean leader's residences
- Official residence
- Ryongsong Residence
- Sinuiju North Korean Leader's Residence
- North Korea Uncovered
