= Nothing to Envy =

2009 nonfiction book by Barbara Demick

- Author: Barbara Demick
- Subject: North Korea
- Publisher: Spiegel & Grau
- Publication date: December 29, 2009
- Publication place: United States
- Pages: 336pp (hardback)
- ISBN: 0385523904
- Dewey Decimal: 951.93

Nothing to Envy: Ordinary Lives in North Korea is a 2009 nonfiction book by Los Angeles Times journalist Barbara Demick, based on interviews with North Korean refugees from the city of Chongjin who had escaped North Korea. In 2010, the book was awarded the BBC Samuel Johnson Prize for Non-Fiction. It was also a nonfiction finalist for the National Book Award in 2010. The title comes from the children's theme song of the 1970 North Korean film We Have Nothing to Envy in the World (Korean: 세상에 부럼 없어라; RR: Sesang-e burom opsora).

Demick interviewed more than 100 defectors and chose to focus on Chongjin because it is likely to be more representative than the capital Pyongyang. Demick briefly discusses the examination of one of the female interviewees into a position of Kippumjo. The events covered include the famine of the 1990s, with the final chapters describing the route that the main subjects of the book took in order to reach Seoul, South Korea, followed by an epilogue describing the effects of the November 30, 2009 currency reform.

== Narrative presentation ==
Demick's writing represents a well researched body of work about lives from such a secretive country, with enough personal details of daily life in North Korea not commonly found. Facts are presented to portray an accurate image of the state and plight North Koreans have faced, but also mentions brighter moments such hardships can create. For example, the author highlights one interviewee's fond memories of courtship, in some ways only made possible by the power-outs and lack of electricity so common in the nation. Demick also had experience working as a journalist, often reporting on North Korea specifically, and the book features follow-up pieces based on the people's stories.

=== Absurdity ===
Throughout the book, Demick describes the harsh experiences her subjects faced, much of it stemming from the "Arduous March", which involved massive, chronic starvation, as well as more recent episodes of wide-scale economic plight caused by the North Korean government's currency 2009 revaluation, explained as "a trick". (p. 287) One interviewee in particular, who considered herself loyal to socialist ideals, managed to survive and feed her family by repeatedly "starting another business". (p. 148)

Facts about such contextual conditions are provided and presented in an informative and telling journalistic style. Keen insight is also provided into the personal experiences, attitudes and views about events, such as one most North Koreans remember, of what it was like for them as individuals on the day Kim Il Sung died (p. 91), and how compulsive and competitive massive weeping rallies became in the days that followed. Such depictions of a deteriorating society are contrasted and weighed against personal loyalties, with one interviewee comparing his love with liberty and life, as expressed by a Hungarian poet. (p. 279)

"Absurd" is often used as the way to portray the catalysts for such calamities in Nothing to Envy: "Along with rice and corn, soybeans have been banned from the market with the absurd explanation that they might be taken into China and resold to the enemy in South Korea." (p. 287) "The North Korean government offered a variety of explanations, from the patently absurd to the barely plausible." (p. 69) The name of the city where the featured interviewed people originate from, Chongjin, means "clear river crossing", a strictly prohibited act of treason for its residents pertaining to the border between North Korea and China, yet risked by the book's subjects.

=== Dogs and doctors ===
Dr. Kim is another featured interviewee who, through much of the book, also considers herself an ardent loyalist to North Korean socialism. As a doctor, particularly a busy one in a nation that has many people suffering from the effects of chronic starvation, lack of modern or even basic medicine, corruption and bribery (p. 218), her skills are in demand and she is relatively higher on the social class compared to other people interviewed in Nothing to Envy. "Her hospital became so strapped that it remained unheated, bandages were fashioned from cut-up bedding, and beer bottles substituted for IV pouches."

Upon escaping to China in order to avoid impending starvation, Dr. Kim experiences a stark revelation. Her experience is captured to depict both her personal, psychological perspective, as well as suddenly realizing such drastic difference in societies she is confronted with:

She still wanted to believe that her country was the best place in the world. The beliefs she had cherished for a lifetime would be vindicated. But now she couldn't deny what was staring her plainly in the face: dogs in China ate better than doctors in North Korea.

— Nothing to Envy, ~ p. 220

== Main interviewees ==
The six main interviewees in the book (using names different than their real ones to avoid any retribution to relatives left in North Korea) are:

- Mrs. Song – a pro-regime housewife with good songbun and past head of the block's inminban citizen's co-operative spying/reporting organisation reporting directly to secret police (State Security Department)
- Oak-hee – Mrs. Song's rebellious, yet eventually enterprising, daughter, who is critical of the regime and only performs good "socialist" activities to avoid suspicion and/or getting in trouble
- Mi-ran – (the main character) daughter of a kaolin miner, a South Korean POW, so with bad songbun, disqualifying her from advancement, but one that may finally be improved with work; is accepted at a teacher's college and begins teaching kindergarten classes right at the start of the country's devastating economic collapse
- Jun-sang – a student with Zainichi Korean ancestry and Mi-ran's secret boyfriend in North Korea; becomes a privileged university student in Pyongyang but still develops a critical outlook on the regime and begins listening to "subversive" South Korean radio and television
- Kim Hyuck – a kotchebi street-boy whose father commits him to an orphanage and must struggle to survive and fend for himself
- Dr. Kim – a doctor with relatives in China; goes from privilege and prestige to starvation and helplessness in treating her starving fellow citizens

== Representation in other media ==
An animated feature film based on the book and sharing the same title was planned to be directed by Andy Glynne. The project launched in 2012 and a pilot was released in 2015. Its status as of January 2018 is not clear.

== Chongjin ==
The author chose to interview defectors from the city of Chongjin, because the national capital city of Pyongyang, from where whatever little information that is available about North Korea typically emanates, is a Potemkin village. The North Korean government divides the population into many classes, and only high class elites are permitted to live in Pyongyang. Chongjin is North Korea's third largest city and an industrial center for what little the nation manufactures. Demick mentions Chongjin prisons in Nothing to Envy, including the political prison camp Kwan-li-so No. 26, Chongori reeducation camp Kyo-hwa-so No. 12, and the Nongpo Detention Center.

== Honors and awards ==
- Won the 2010 Samuel Johnson Prize for Non-Fiction
- Finalist, the National Book Award
- Finalist, National Book Critics Circle Award
