= Hamhung concentration camp =

North Korean concentration camp

Coordinates: 39°57′28″N 127°33′46″E

- Chosŏn'gŭl: 함흥 제9호 교화소
- Hancha: 咸興第九號敎化所
- Revised Romanization: Hamheung Je9ho Gyohwaso
- McCune–Reischauer: Hamhŭng Che9ho Kyohwaso
- Chosŏn'gŭl: 함흥 정치범 수용소
- Hancha: 咸興政治犯收容所
- Revised Romanization: Hamheung Jeongchibeom Suyongso
- McCune–Reischauer: Hamhŭng Chŏngch'ibŏm Suyongso

Hamhung concentration camp (also spelled Hamheung) is a re-education camp in North Korea. The official name of the camp is Kyo-hwa-so No. 9 (Re-education Camp No. 9). The sub-facility for women is sometimes called Kyo-hwa-so No. 15.

== Location ==
The camp is located in Hamhung city, South Hamgyong province. The main facility for male prisoners is situated in Hoesang-dong, about 6 km (3.7 mi) northeast of downtown Hamhung. The sub-facility for female prisoners is across the railway station near Songwon-ri, a small village about 18 km (11 mi) northeast of the city center. Smaller sub-facilities are in Chongpyong county and in Kowon county, both also in South Hamgyong province.

Location of the Hamhung camp in North Korea

== Description ==
Hamhung concentration camp consists of five departments:

- The 1st and 2nd departments are located in the main facility. Around 1,500 male prisoners have to produce Ssangma sewing machines and repair them. The building was erected as a colonial prison during the period of Japanese Occupation (1910 – 1945). It was later used as a factory and then as a prison factory since the 1990s.
- The 3rd department in Songwon-ri is a prison farm with livestock facilities, rice paddies, and vegetable patches, where 500 female prisoners have to work. It was erected in 1998 mainly for defectors.
- The 4th department in Chongpyong-gun is a gold mine. The number of prisoners there is unknown.
- The 5th department in Kowon-gun is a coal mine. The number of prisoners there is unknown.

Besides some common criminals, there are many political prisoners, especially repatriated refugees in the camp.

== Living conditions ==
Many prisoners sleep on straw and grass. In the 1st department, prisoners sleep on the factory bridges to avoid the lice-infested concrete floor. Food rations are very small, and prisoners are always hungry. They only get some steamed corn and a watery cabbage soup or some bean porridge, but no salt or protein. In order to survive, the prisoners eat raw mice, snakes, frogs, and insects they can find or grass, tree leaves, or bark. Some prisoners even eat undigested beans or corn kernels from cow dung, although they are punished when detected. Ill prisoners still have to work to avoid beatings and reduced food rations. There is just one military doctor in the prison, no medical devices, and almost no medicine. Prisoners often get infected when getting injections.

== Working conditions ==
Former prisoners said they had to work from 5:00 a. m. (except in winter) to 7:00 p. m. with only two breaks. In the 3rd department, women have to do hard farm work with poor and inadequate tools regardless of the weather. After dinner, all prisoners have to attend re-education and mutual criticism sessions, often until 10:00 p.m. If prisoners fail to memorize the teachings of Kim Il Sung, their prison term is extended. The prison is surrounded by an electric fence, and the prisoners are guarded by security officers 24 hours a day and night.

== Human rights violations ==
Former prisoners reported that inmates look like skeletons barely covered with skin or skinny sticks with big heads. In case prisoners do not meet their work quota or violate rules (e. g., if they steal food), they are severely kicked or beaten with rifle butts or wooden sticks. One of the witnesses described how she was beaten more than 30 times, though her head was injured and her ears and nose were bleeding. Another common punishment is the significant reduction of food rations. Prisoners in solitary confinement get almost no food. In 2003 a former prisoner witnessed a public execution by firing squad with all prisoners gathered to watch. Witnesses testified that in winter 1999/2000, around 500 prisoners died in six months. Many of them died in hard and dangerous work when a tunnel from the Hamhung concentration camp to the Oro concentration camp was dug. Bang Mi-sun reported that during her 18-month prison term, around 20% of prisoners in her work group and in other work groups died. Corpses are burnt in large quantities in a furnace. Female prisoners are often sexually assaulted and sometimes raped by security officers. Pregnant women are taken outside the prison to get forced abortions.

== Prisoners (witnesses) ==
- Bang Mi-sun (2000 – 2001 in Hamhung) was repatriated from China for illegal border-crossing.
- An unidentified former prisoner (female, 1998 - 2000 in Hamhung) gave testimony to Anti-Slavery International about the camp. She was repatriated from China and imprisoned for illegal border crossing.
- Eight other unidentified former prisoners (seven female, one male; between 1998 and 2007 in Hamhung) were interviewed by the Database Center for North Korean Human Rights. Most of them do not want to be identified out of fear that their relatives in North Korea might be punished.

== See also ==
- Human rights in North Korea
- Kaechon concentration camp
- North Korean defectors
- Prisons in North Korea
