= Sariwon concentration camp =

Concentration camp in North Korea

Coordinates: 38.512614°N 125.774053°E

Location of Sariwon concentration camp in North Korea

Kyo-hwa-so No. 6 Sariwon (사리원 6호 교화소) is a "reeducation camp" in Sariwon, North Hwanghae. It holds roughly 3,500-4,000 prisoners.

In January 2026 it was reported based on satellite imagery that the North Korean government had begun rebuilding the prison with the facility undergoing demolition and construction since late 2023.

== See also ==
- Human Rights in North Korea
- Prisons in North Korea
