= Tongrim concentration camp =

Reeducation camp in North Korea

Coordinates: 39.877580°N 124.729600°E

Location of Tongrim concentration camp in North Korea

Kyo-hwa-so No. 2 Tongrim (동림 제 2호 교화소) is a remote "reeducation camp" in Tongrim County, North Pyongan. Its number of prisoners and its state of operation are unknown, with no known successful escapes or survivors.

== See also ==
- Human Rights in North Korea
- Prisons in North Korea
