= Ryongsong Residence =

North Korean presidential palace

Coordinates: 39°06′59″N 125°48′21″E

- Location within Pyongyang
- Alternative names: Residence No. 55; Central Luxury Mansion

General information
- Type: Presidential palace
- Location: Ryongsong District, Pyongyang, North Korea
- Current tenants: Kim Jong Un; Ri Sol-ju
- Completed: 1983

Design and construction
- Main contractor: Korean People's Army

- Ryongsong Residence
- Chosŏn'gŭl: 룡성 관저
- Hancha: 龍城官邸
- Revised Romanization: Yongseong Gwanjeo
- McCune–Reischauer: Ryongsŏng Kwanjŏ

Ryongsong Residence (Korean: 룡성 관저), also called Residence No. 55 (55호 관저), is the main official residence of North Korean supreme leader Kim Jong Un and first lady Ri Sol-ju.

== Location ==
The residence is located in Ryongsong District in northern Pyongyang, around 12 km (7.5 mi) northeast of Kim Il Sung Square. The size of the whole leadership complex is around 12 km^{2} (4.6 mi^{2}). According to Kim Jong Il's former bodyguard Lee Young Guk, there are at least eight North Korean leaders' residences outside Pyongyang.

== Description ==
The compound was constructed by the Korean People's Army construction brigade and completed in 1983 under the rule of Kim Il Sung. It was later used by Kim Jong Il, his sister Kim Kyong Hui and his brother-in-law Jang Song Thaek. Since he succeeded his father as leader of North Korea, Kim Jong Un has used Ryongsong Residence as his main residence. The complex has an underground wartime headquarters, protected with walls with iron rods and concrete covered with lead in case of a nuclear war. There are numerous military units to protect the headquarters stationed around the complex in possession of mass scale conventional weapons. The area is surrounded by an electric fence, mine fields and many security checkpoints. The headquarters is connected with Changgyong Residence (Residence No. 26) and other residences with tunnels. A private underground train station is also inside the residence compound. Besides large houses and well-tended gardens there are man-made lakes and various recreational facilities. Witnesses have reported luxurious interiors with ornate furnishings, deep plush carpets and fancy chandeliers.

== Facilities ==
Facilities of the residence are as follows:

- Banquet halls at the lakefront
- Swimming pool 15 m (49 ft) wide and 50 m (160 ft) long with a giant waterslide
- Running track and athletic field
- Spa and sauna
- Horse stables and racing track
- Shooting range

== See also ==
- North Korean leader's residences
- Official residence
- Kangdong Residence
- Sinuiju North Korean Leader's Residence
- North Korea Uncovered
