= Kanggye concentration camp =

Concentration camp in North Korea

Coordinates: 40.954322°N 126.567864°E

Location of Kanggye concentration camp in North Korea

Kyo-hwa-so No. 7 Kanggye (강계 7호 교화소) is a "reeducation camp" in Kanggye, Chagang. Its number of prisoners and its state of operation is currently unknown.

== See also ==
- Human Rights in North Korea
- Prisons in North Korea
