= Wonsan concentration camp =

Concentration camp in North Korea

Coordinates: 39.157350°N 127.364378°E

Location of Wonsan concentration camp in North Korea

Kyo-hwa-so No. 88 Wonsan (원산 88호 교화소) is a "reeducation camp" in Wonsan, Kangwŏn. Its number of prisoners is currently unknown.

== See also ==
- Human Rights in North Korea
- Prisons in North Korea
