= We have nothing to envy in the world =

Phrase in North Korean propaganda

- Hangul: 세상에 부럼없어라
- RR: Sesange bureomeopseora
- MR: Sesange purŏmŏpsŏra

"We have nothing to envy in the world" (Korean: 세상에 부럼없어라) is a common phrase in North Korean propaganda.

== Usage of the phrase ==
The phrase was used in the gift packets the North Korean children receive during the Day of the Sun and Day of the Shining Star events since the 1970s. The phrase was also the title of a performance in North Korea commemorating the 70th anniversary of the Korean Children's Union in 2016. In a rock in Mount Kumgang the lyrics to the song with the same phrase is inscribed which was done commemorating the 25th anniversary of the Korean Children's Union in 1972. The phrase was also written on the one North Korean won.

== Works inspired from the phrase ==
=== Song ===
The song was composed in 1961 by North Korean composer Kim Hyuk. The song was commonly sung during the 1980s but were not sung for a long time due to the North Korean famine in the 1990s until it was revived at the World Children's Day event in 2016. The song received the Kim Jong Il Prize and Kim Il Sung Prize in May 2016. According to the Daily NK, the song's lyrics are reported to be parodied among the North Koreans.

=== Film ===
The film was made in 1970, and was produced by Pak Hak who directed the North Korean film The Flower Girl. The film incorporated Choi Seung-hee's version of the Buchaechum that was created in 1970 with the order of Kim Jong Il. The film is considered in North Korea as one of the greatest examples of films where the bangchang (Note: Bangchang (방창, 傍唱) is defined in the North Korean dictionary as "a song that explains and complements the mental state of the protagonist and dramatic progression" and is similar to job of Benshis that existed in the silent film era of Japan.) technique is applied.

== See also ==
- Nothing to Envy
- Strong and Prosperous Nation
