= Kangdong concentration camp =

Reeducation camp in North Korea

Coordinates: 39.00878°N 126.15369°E

- Chosŏn'gŭl: 강동 제4호교화소
- Hancha: 江東第四號敎化所
- Revised Romanization: Gangdong Je4ho Gyohwaso
- McCune–Reischauer: Kangdong Che4ho Kyohwaso
- Chosŏn'gŭl: 강동 정치범 수용소
- Hancha: 江東政治犯收容所
- Revised Romanization: Gangdong Jeongchibeom Suyongso
- McCune–Reischauer: Kangdong Chŏngch'ibŏm Suyongso

Location of Kangdong camp in North Korea

Kangdong concentration camp (also spelled Gangdong) is a reeducation camp in North Korea. The official name of the camp is Kyo-hwa-so No. 4 (Reeducation camp no. 4).

The camp consists of a large prison compound situated between Samdung-ri and the Nam River, in Kangdong-gun, in South Pyongan province of North Korea, about 30 km (19 mi) east of downtown Pyongyang.

The main section of the camp is around 250 m (820 ft) long and 200 m (660 ft) wide, surrounded by a high wall. The whole camp is roughly 2 km (1.2 mi) long by 1.5 km (0.93 mi) wide, surrounded by a barbed-wire fence. In 1997, it held approximately 7,000 prisoners. Most of the prisoners are either soldiers or residents of Pyongyang, with sentences ranging from 5 to 20 years. Working facilities include a cement factory, a coal mine, a limestone quarry, a glass factory, and some agriculture.

== Human rights situation ==
According to a former prisoner, an average of 500 prisoners die annually, mostly due to waterborne illnesses. Another former prisoner reported high death rates due to work accidents, malnutrition, and disease. Seriously ill prisoners are sent home on sick leave to reduce the apparent number of deaths in detention. In the limestone quarries, the prisoners have to do hard labor in hazardous conditions, with prisoners often receiving or sustaining chest ailments and lung diseases from limestone dust. Moreover, as the prisoners are rarely allowed to wash their faces, many suffer from skin abrasions and infections. Prisoners live in unsanitary conditions; they sleep on the floor in groups of 50 to 100 people, without bathing or changing their clothes. Food rations consist of only 50 g (2 oz) of corn and wheat and some cabbage soup per meal, and all prisoners are seriously underweight. A former prisoner witnessed eight public executions during the eight months he was held in the camp. Rule violations are punished with reduced rations, extended sentences, and detainment in very small punishment cells. There is a criticism session every week, in which the prison officials criticize prisoners in front of a large group of prisoners.

== See also ==
- Human rights in North Korea
- Kaechon concentration camp
