= Kippumjo =

Group of courtesans maintained by the leader of North Korea

- Hangul: 기쁨조
- Hanja: 기쁨組
- RR: Gippeumjo
- MR: Kippŭmjo

The Kippumjo (Korean: 기쁨조; translated as Pleasure Squad, Pleasure Brigade, or Pleasure Group), sometimes spelled Kippeumjo (also Gippumjo or Gippeumjo), is an unconfirmed collection of groups active between 1978 and the late 2010s made up by approximately 2,000 women and girls reportedly maintained by the leader of North Korea for the purpose of providing entertainment, including that of a sexual nature, for high-ranking Workers' Party of Korea (WPK) officials and their families, as well as, occasionally, distinguished guests.

== Etymology ==
The first two syllables of the name, kippum (기쁨), is a native Korean word meaning joy or happiness. The suffix jo (Korean: 조; Hanja: 組) is a Sino-Korean word which describes a group of people, roughly analogous to the terms "squad" or "team".

== History ==
=== Kim Il Sung ===
A 2015 Fox News article, citing the South Korean newspaper The Chosun Ilbo, says that "pleasure squads" have reportedly existed since the administration of North Korea's first leader, Kim Il Sung. According to a 2003 article on the South Korean news website SisaFocus, it is said that the first group was recruited in 1978 by Ri Dong-ho, the First Vice Director of the United Front Department of the Workers' Party of Korea, for the purpose of entertaining Kim at the Munsu Chodaeso (문수 초대소; Munsu Guesthouse).

Bradley K Martin's 2004 book Under the Loving Care of the Fatherly Leader is based on a combination of visits to North Korea, research and interviews with defectors carried out in the early 1990s. Martin writes that Kim Il Sung was not just interested in pleasure, but also in rejuvenating himself through absorbing a young virgin's ki, or life-force, during sex.

=== Kim Jong Il ===
There were rumors that Kim Il Sung's son and successor, Kim Jong Il, also maintained a Kippumjo, according to an unnamed North Korean defector reported in the online newspaper Daily NK in 2013. The group that used to perform for Kim Jong Il was disbanded shortly after his death in December 2011, according to The Chosun Ilbo in April 2015. The newspaper said that members of Kim Jong Il's Kippumjo were made to sign a pledge of secrecy in exchange for money and gifts. According to the paper, the women who worked as entertainers received an amount of money worth up to $4,000 before returning to their hometowns. The members of the squad were also said to have received compensation in the form of home appliances.

=== Kim Jong Un ===
In 2015, Kim Jong Un, the son and successor to Kim Jong Il, was said to be seeking new members for his own Kippumjo after his father's group of women had been disbanded, according to The Chosun Ilbo. The story also appeared in Britain's Daily Telegraph newspaper. As of 2026, no credible sources report that these squads are still active, as the main stories describing the squads revolve around the era of Kim Jong Il.

== Testimony ==
Little is known outside North Korea about the Kippumjo, and most reports are based on the accounts of North Koreans who have defected, particularly Mi-Hyang, who told the magazine Marie Claire in 2010 that she had been a Kippumjo member, and Kenji Fujimoto, who says he was a chef to Kim Jong Il. Further testimony is provided by personal bodyguard Kang Jin.

== Structure ==
According to British journalist Jasper Becker, writing for the Asia Times in 2003, a former bodyguard has said that each pleasure group was composed of three teams:

1. Manjokjo (만족조; 滿足組) – a satisfaction team (which provides sexual services)
2. Haengbokjo (행복조; 幸福組) – a happiness team (which provides massages)
3. Gamujo (가무조; 歌舞組) – a dancing and singing team

Kippumjo is briefly discussed in the 2009 book Nothing to Envy by US journalist Barbara Demick. The book is based on interviews with North Korean defectors. According to Demick, girls from throughout the country were recruited to be Kippumjo members according to government criteria. Suki Kim, a Korean American journalist who has lived undercover in North Korea, wrote in 2014 that one of the criteria was that they had to be virgins. In Bradley K. Martin's 2004 book he says that schools recommended suitable teenage girls to recruiters, with their parents receiving enhanced status and money. Once recruited, members of the Kippumjo underwent extensive training, sometimes abroad, according to Mi-Hyang.

Martin adds that women retired from Kippumjo at 22 and married members of the country's elite. In the 2014 memoir of defector Jang Jin-sung, Dear Leader: Poet, Spy, Escapee – A Look Inside North Korea, Jang writes of the Kippumjo during the time of Kim Jong Il's rule that: "Most of them go into arranged marriages with personal guards or senior cadres cleared to work in foreign affairs. Some even go on to become cadres themselves." Britain's Daily Telegraph newspaper reported in 2015 that many Kippumjo members were retired in their 20s and married military officers who were seeking wives.

== See also ==
- Amazonian Guard, the female bodyguards of the Libyan leader Muammar Gaddafi
- Comfort women
- Disinformation in media coverage of North Korea
- Kungnyŏ, women who waited on royalty in traditional Korean society
- Kisaeng, enslaved women trained as courtesans in traditional Korean society
- Prostitution in North Korea
