= Hoeryong reeducation camp =

Prison camp in North Korea

Location of Hoeryong camp in North Korea

Kyo-hwa-so Hoeryong(회령교화소) is a "reeducation camp" in Hoeryong, in North Hamgyong province of North Korea. It is not to be confused with Haengyong political prison camp (Kwan-li-so Nr. 22), which is located 10 km (6.2 mi) north-east of Hoeryong and is sometimes also called Hoeryong camp. It holds roughly 1,500 prisoners.

== See also ==
- Human rights in North Korea
- Kaechon concentration camp
