= Sinuiju concentration camp =

Concentration camp in North Korea

Coordinates: 40.06138°N 124.410145°E

Location of Sinuiju concentration camp in North Korea

Kyo-hwa-so No. 3 Sinuiju (신의주 3호 교화소) is a "reeducation camp" in North Pyongan, North Korea. It holds roughly 2,500 prisoners.

== See also ==
- Human Rights in North Korea
- Kaechon concentration camp
