= Chungsan concentration camp =

Reeducation camp in North Korea

- Chosŏn'gŭl: 증산 제11호 교화소
- Hancha: 甑山第十一號敎化所
- Revised Romanization: Jeungsan Je11ho Gyohwaso
- McCune–Reischauer: Chŭngsan Che11ho Kyohwaso
- Chosŏn'gŭl: 증산 정치범 수용소
- Hancha: 甑山政治犯收容所
- Revised Romanization: Jeungsan Jeongchibeom Suyongso
- McCune–Reischauer: Chŭngsan Chŏngch'ibŏm Suyongso

Chungsan concentration camp (also spelled Jeungsan, Jungsan or Joongsan) is a reeducation camp in North Korea. Its official name is Kyo-hwa-so No. 11 (Reeducation camp no. 11).

== Location ==
The camp is in Chungsan county, in South Pyongan province of North Korea. It is in the Yellow Sea coast, around 50 km (31 mi) west of Pyongyang.

== Description ==
Location of Chungsan camp in North Korea

Chungsan camp is a currently operational and well-maintained largely women's penitentiary as of 2020. Encompassing approximately 11.9 km^{2} (4.61 mi^{2}), preliminary imagery analysis suggests a minimum of 1,500–2,500 are detained, although the number is likely significantly higher with estimates projecting between 3,300 and 5,000 prisoners. Since 1999 the camp is used to detain female defectors, which account for 50–60% of the prisoners, while others are incarcerated for theft, prostitution, unauthorized trade, etc. The camp's primary activities are pig breeding and agriculture with a much-smaller production of sea salt. The camp is surrounded by fields, where the prisoners have to grow rice and corn for delivery to the Ministry of Public Security.

== Human rights situation ==
The food rations are very small. According to a former prisoner, one third of the prisoners died from combinations of malnutrition, disease, and forced labor within a year. This former prisoner reported that the prisoners were often beaten with iron bars, if they did not work hard enough. She got very ill, because her wounds from the beatings got infected. Dead prisoners are buried in mass shallow graves on a nearby hill referred to as “Flower Mountain,” (꽃동산) appropriately named because of its azaleas that bloom every spring. Another former prisoner estimates that 5,000 deceased have been buried at Flower Mountain.

In interviews other former prisoners reported the following:

- Solitary confinement cells,
- Hard work in farming, from 4 a.m. to 7 or 8 p.m. in the farming season,
- A strict system of control and surveillance,
- Public executions,
- Beatings in cases of rule violations.

== Camp developments ==
As of 2020, the facility consists of headquarters, at least fourteen detainee divisions, two to three miscellaneous support facilities, four Korean People's Army (KPA) bases, and the Sinsŏng-ri fishery station. A satellite imagery analysis released by the Committee for Human Rights in North Korea in December 2020 reveals no major changes to the overall physical boundaries of the camp; however, individual detainee divisions have undergone notable updates or expansion from 2002 to 2019. Most of these reconfiguration projects include the construction of additional prisoner housing, livestock sheds, security walls, and guard towers, indicating efforts to increase agricultural output and accommodate a growing prisoner population.

== Prisoners (witnesses) ==
- Kim Miran (around 2002–2004 in Chungsan) was repatriated from China for illegal border-crossing.
- An unidentified former prisoner (female, 2004–2005 in Chungsan) gave testimony to HRNK about the camp. She was repatriated from China and imprisoned without a trial for illegal border crossing.
- Ten other unidentified former prisoners (all female) were interviewed by the Database Center for North Korean Human Rights. Most of them do not want to be identified for fear that their relatives in North Korea would be punished.

== See also ==
- Human rights in North Korea
- Kaechon concentration camp
- North Korean defectors
