= Kenji Fujimoto =

Japanese chef of Kim Jong-il (born 1947)

- 藤本 健二
- Born: 1947 (age 78–79); Japan
- Occupations: Chef, writer
- Known for: Personal chef of Kim Jong Il, defector
- Notable work: Kim's Private Life, The Honorable General Who Loved Nuclear Weapons and Girls; Kim's Chef; I was Kim Jong-il's Cook (2003)

Kenji Fujimoto (藤本 健二, Fujimoto Kenji; born 1947) is a Japanese chef who was the personal sushi chef of former North Korean leader Kim Jong Il from 1988 to 2001. Fujimoto, who uses a pseudonym and whose real name is not public knowledge, published a memoir in 2003 entitled I was Kim Jong-il's Cook, detailing many of his experiences with Kim Jong Il. Fujimoto correctly predicted that Kim Jong Un (who was relatively unknown at that time) would be appointed as his father's successor as Supreme Leader instead of Kim Jong-nam or Kim Jong-chul, which was contrary to the prevailing consensus of experts on North Korean politics. Fujimoto's prediction proved true in December 2011.

A leaked U.S. diplomatic cable from Tokyo revealed that he was the best and often the sole source of North Korean information for Japan's Cabinet Intelligence and Research Office.

== Biography ==
=== Arrival in North Korea ===
Fujimoto first visited North Korea in 1982. Six years later, he became Kim's personal sushi chef on a salary of £45,000 a year (equivalent to £125,000 in 2025), and was given two Mercedes cars. Soon after, he became Kim's companion; both men, according to Kenji, went shooting, riding and water-skiing together. He confirmed a widely believed rumour that Kim had a serious fall from his horse in 1992, breaking his collar bone and lying unconscious for several hours.

=== Claims ===
Fujimoto states that Kim Jong Il had a taste for "live fish" and expensive alcohol such as French wines and brandies, particularly Hennessy cognac, while claiming that both Jong-il and his third son, Kim Jong Un, "both like shark fin soup three times a week". According to Fujimoto, he would travel the world for Kim Jong Il, all expenses paid, purchasing Chinese melons, Czech beer, Uzbek caviar, Thai papayas and Danish pork. On one occasion, an envoy was sent to China to retrieve some McDonald's hamburgers. Kim's wine cellar contains 10,000 bottles, he said, and the banquets that Kim holds have lasted for four days. Fujimoto also said there was an institute based in Pyongyang staffed by 200 individuals devoted entirely to Kim Jong Il's diet, ensuring he ate the best and most healthy foods.

He also spoke of "Kim's Pleasure Squad": young women chosen to dance for, sing for and bathe Kim; they would be instructed to undress while other guests were not allowed to touch them, with Kim saying that would amount to "theft". He said that Kim liked disco music, and preferred watching others dance, rather than dancing himself. Fujimoto said he himself later married one of the women at a drunken wedding, where he passed out on cognac and woke to find his pubic hair shaved.

He has described Kim Jong Il as having a "violent temper". In an interview on Japanese commercial television, he says that Kim Jong Un, then the heir apparent of Jong-il, "knows how to be angry and how to praise. He has the ability to lead people... also he loves basketball, roller-blading, snowboarding and skiing... I watched him play golf once and he reminded me of a top Japanese professional." Fujimoto says he was handed a photo of Jong-un when he was younger, adding they refused to share recent photos with him. He was told not to make the photo public; however, in February 2009, he released the photo. Jong-il's other son, Kim Jong-chul, was said by Jong-il to be "too feminine and unfit for leadership".

In addition to these claims, Fujimoto spoke of a nuclear accident in 1995 at an unnamed plant, where several workers became ill and lost their teeth, and that Kim Jong Il was severely affected by his father's death in 1994, and was even found with a gun at one point. He was also reported to have asked Fujimoto in 1989 what he thought about nuclear weapons.

=== Escape from North Korea ===
Fujimoto has stated that he thought about leaving for Japan permanently on several occasions while in North Korea. On a visit to Japan in 1996, he was arrested after carrying a fake Dominican Republic passport. In March 2001, shortly before he escaped via China to Japan for fear he was being spied upon, he said he presented a videotape to Kim Jong Il of a sea urchin dish from a Japanese television show which he promised he would cook for him. Fujimoto said he would travel to Hokkaido to buy some sea urchin, to which Kim replied "That's a great idea. Go for it!" On travelling to Japan, Fujimoto did not return to North Korea, and started living in hiding, after allegedly being targeted by North Korean agents. He appeared on Japanese television with his face obscured as a "Kim Jong-il expert". After publishing his memoir, I was Kim Jong-il's Cook, he wore a bullet-resistant vest.

=== Return to North Korea ===
In June 2012, Fujimoto received an invitation from North Korean leader Kim Jong Un, and on July 21, 2012, flew to Pyongyang via Beijing. He was told that his family was sent to a coal mine but were brought back to Pyongyang to welcome Fujimoto, while his son died earlier as a result of a disease from hard labor. During his visit, he reportedly visited Kim Jong Un and his wife, and mentioned that Pyongyang had changed significantly over the previous decade. In 2017, Fujimoto opened Takahashi, a Japanese restaurant in Pyongyang. In June 2019, media reports suggested Fujimoto had been arrested. However, a month later, the British ambassador to North Korea, Colin Crooks, visited Fujimoto at his restaurant. Japanese tourists are refused visits.

== Books ==
Fujimoto has written three books: Kim's Chef, Kim's Private Life and The Honorable General Who Loved Nuclear Weapons and Girls. His 2003 memoir I was Kim Jong-il's Cook (also known as Kim's Chef) was a best-seller in Japan.

== See also ==
- Residences of North Korean leaders that Kenji Fujimoto witnessed firsthand
