= Barbara Demick =

American journalist

- Education: Yale College (BA)
- Occupations: Journalist, author
- Website: https://www.barbarademick.com

Barbara Demick is an American journalist. She was the Beijing bureau chief of the Los Angeles Times. She is also known for her books Nothing to Envy: Ordinary Lives in North Korea, Eat the Buddha: Life and Death in a Tibetan Town, and Daughters of the Bamboo Grove: China’s Stolen Children and a Story of Separated Twins.

== Early life and education ==
Demick grew up in Ridgewood, New Jersey. She attended Yale University, graduating with a bachelor's degree in economic history.

== Career ==
Demick was a correspondent for The Philadelphia Inquirer in Eastern Europe from 1993 to 1997. Along with photographer John Costello, she produced a series of articles that ran 1994–1996 following life on one Sarajevo street over the course of the war in Bosnia. The series won the George Polk Award for international reporting, the Robert F. Kennedy Journalism Award for international reporting and was a finalist for the Pulitzer in the features category. She was stationed in the Middle East for the newspaper between 1997 and 2001.

In 2001, Demick moved to the Los Angeles Times and became the newspaper's first bureau chief in Korea. Demick reported extensively on human rights in North Korea, interviewing large numbers of refugees in China and South Korea. She focused on economic and social changes inside North Korea and on the situation of North Korean women sold into marriages in China. She wrote an extensive series of articles about life inside the North Korean city of Chongjin. In 2005, Demick was a co-winner of the American Academy of Diplomacy's Arthur Ross Award for Distinguished Reporting & Analysis on Foreign Affairs. In 2006, her reports about North Korea won the Overseas Press Club's Joe and Laurie Dine Award for Human Rights Reporting and the Asia Society's Osborn Elliott Prize for Excellence in Asian Journalism. That same year, Demick was also named print journalist of the year by the Los Angeles Press Club.

In 2010, she won the Samuel Johnson Prize for Non-Fiction for her work, Nothing to Envy: Ordinary Lives in North Korea. The book was also a finalist for the U.S.'s most prestigious literary prize, the National Book Award. and for the National Book Critics Circle Award. An animated feature film based on the book and sharing the same title was planned to be directed by Andy Glynne. The project launched in 2012 and a pilot was released in 2015.

Her first book, Logavina Street, was republished in an updated edition in April 2012 by Spiegel & Grau, a division of Random House. It was published in the UK by Granta under the title Besieged: Life Under Fire on a Sarajevo Street.

In 2020 Demick's third book, Eat the Buddha: Life and Death in a Tibetan Town, was published. It focuses on the life of Tibetan people in Ngawa, Sichuan, China, and was described by The Observer as "a deeply textured, densely reported and compelling" work which "captures crushing historical events through the stories of individuals."

Demick was a visiting professor at Princeton University in 2006-2007 teaching Coverage of Repressive Regimes through the Ferris Fellowship at the Council of the Humanities. She moved to Beijing for the Los Angeles Times in 2007, and is also an occasional contributor to The New Yorker.

== Books ==
- Logavina Street: Life and Death in a Sarajevo Neighborhood (Andrews & McMeel, 1996).
- Nothing to Envy: Ordinary Lives in North Korea (Spiegel & Grau/Random House, December 2009; Granta Books, 2010)
- Eat the Buddha: Life and Death in a Tibetan Town (Random House, July 2020)
- Daughters of the Bamboo Grove: China’s Stolen Children and a Story of Separated Twins (Random House, 2025)

== Awards ==
- 2026: Awarded, Cornelius Ryan Award, Daughters of the Bamboo Grove
- 2026: Longlisted, Women's Prize for Non-Fiction, Daughters of the Bamboo Grove
- 2025: Longlisted, Baillie Gifford Prize, Daughters of the Bamboo Grove: China’s Stolen Children and a Story of Separated Twins
- 2012 Shorenstein Award for Asia coverage Stanford University
- 2012 International Human Rights Book Award for German-edition of Nothing to Envy.
- 2011 Finalist, National Book Critics Circle award for non-fiction.
- 2011 Finalist, National Book Award for non-fiction
- 2010: Awarded, BBC Samuel Johnson Prize for Non-Fiction, Nothing to Envy: Ordinary Lives in North Korea
- 2006: Awarded, Overseas Press Club's Joe and Laurie Dine Award for Human Rights Reporting
- 2006: Awarded, Asia Society's Osborn Elliott Prize for Excellence in Asian Journalism
- 2006: Awarded, Los Angeles Press Club Print Journalist of the Year
- 2005: Awarded, American Academy of Diplomacy's Arthur Ross Award for Distinguished Reporting & Analysis on Foreign Affairs
- 1994: Awarded, George Polk Awards, The Philadelphia Inquirer
- 1994: Awarded, Robert F. Kennedy Journalism Award, The Philadelphia Inquirer
- 1994: Nominated, Pulitzer Prize, The Philadelphia Inquirer
