= Hyongjesan =

Mountain range in North Korea

- Hangul: 형제산
- Hanja: 兄弟山
- RR: Hyeongjesan
- MR: Hyŏngjesan

Hyŏngjesan are mountains which consist of Hyŏngsan (Pukhyŏngjesan) and Chesan (Namhyŏngjesan) in Ryongsong-guyok and Hyongjesan-guyok, Pyongyang, North Korea.
