= Ryongsong-guyok =

District of Pyongyang, North Korea

Ryongsŏng-guyŏk 룡성구역
- Guyŏk of Pyongyang

Korean transcription(s)
  - Hanja: 龍城區域
  - McCune-Reischauer: Ryongsŏng-guyŏk
  - Revised Romanization: Ryongseong-guyeok
- Location of Ryongsong-guyok within Pyongyang
- Coordinates: 39°08′35″N 125°48′22″E
- Country: North Korea
- Direct-administered city: P'yŏngyang-Chikhalsi

Area
  - Total: 131.6 km^{2} (50.8 sq mi)

Population (2008)
  - Total: 195,891
  - Density: 1,489/km^{2} (3,855/sq mi)

- Ryongsong-guyok
- Chosŏn'gŭl: 룡성구역
- Hancha: 龍城區域
- Revised Romanization: Ryongseong-guyeok
- McCune–Reischauer: Ryongsŏng-guyŏk

Ryongsŏng-guyŏk, or Ryongsŏng District (룡성구역) is one of the 19 guyok which constitute the city of Pyongyang, North Korea. Ryongsong Residence, the main residence of Kim Jong-un is located in this district.

Following a Standing Committee of the Supreme People's Assembly decision on 15 January 2023, Ryongmun-dong was renamed to Ryongmun 1-dong, and Hwasong-dong was renamed to Ryongmun 2-dong.

== Administrative divisions ==
Since 2023, it is certain that these tongs are part of Ryongsŏng-guyŏk(neighbourhoods):

- Chung'i-dong 중이동 (中二洞)
- Ch'ŏnggyŏ-dong 청계동 (淸溪洞)
- Masan-dong 마산동 (馬山洞)
- Myŏng'o-dong 명오동 (明梧洞)
- Ŏ'ŭn-dong 어은동 (御恩洞)
- Rimwŏn-dong 림원동 (林原洞)
- Ryongch'u 1-dong 룡추 1동 (龍秋 1洞)
- Ryongch'u 2-dong 룡추 2동 (龍秋 2洞)
- Ryongmun 1-dong 룡문1동 (龍門1洞)
- Ryongmun 2-dong 룡문2동 (龍門2洞)
- Ryongsŏng 1-dong 룡성 1동 (龍城 1洞)
- Ryongsŏng 2-dong 룡성 2동 (龍城 2洞)
- Taech'ŏn-dong 대천동 (大泉洞)
- Unha-dong 은하동 (銀河洞)

The following tongs are likely to be defunct as Unha dong is renamed from Ryonggungdong in 2013.

- Ryonggung 1-dong 룡궁 1동 (龍宮 1洞)
- Ryonggung 2-dong 룡궁 2동 (龍宮 2洞)

== Mountains ==
- Hyongjesan

== See also ==
- Residences of North Korean leaders
