= Tanchon concentration camp =

Concentration camp in North Korea

Location of Tanchon camp in North Korea

Kyo-hwa-so No. 77 Tanchon (77호 단천 교화소) was a "reeducation camp" with c. 6,000 prisoners near Tanchon in South Hamgyong province, North Korea.

== See also ==
- Human rights in North Korea
- Kaechon concentration camp
