= Residences of North Korean leaders =

There are more than a dozen leader's residences in North Korea, according to Kim Jong Il's former bodyguard Lee Young-guk. Many of the residences were identified on satellite images in the North Korea Uncovered project. Ryongsong Residence is the central residence of Kim Jong Un. All residences are kept secret by the North Korean government and few photographs exist.

Leader's residences in North Korea

Name	Location	Direction from city center	Coordinates
Ryongsong Residence	Ryongsong district (Pyongyang)	12 km (7.5 mi) northeast	39.116377 N, 125.805817 E
Kangdong Residence	Kangdong county (Pyongyang)	30 km (19 mi) northeast	39.201381 N, 126.020683 E
Jindallae Residence	Kangdong County (Pyongyang)	30 km (19 mi) northeast	39.11030179972335°N 125.996507273°E
Sinuiju Residence	Sinuiju (North Pyongan)	8.5 km (5.3 mi) east	40.081519 N, 124.499307 E
Ryokpo Residence	Ryokpo district (Pyongyang)	19 km (12 mi) southeast	38.911222 N, 125.922911 E
Samsok Residence	Samsok district (Pyongyang)	21 km (13 mi) northeast	39.102224 N, 125.973830 E
Pyongsong Residence	Pyongsong (South Pyongan)	11 km (6.8 mi) northwest	39.338774 N, 125.804062 E
Wonsan Residence	Wonsan (Kangwon)	5 km (3.1 mi) northeast	39.188647 N, 127.477718 E
Changsuwon Residence	Ryongsong district (Pyongyang)	15 km (9.3 mi) northeast	39.116069 N, 125.877501 E
Nampo Residence	Nampo (South Pyongan)	9 km (5.6 mi) northwest	38.777724 N, 125.321217 E
Paektusan Residence	Samjiyon County (Ryanggang)	7 km (4.3 mi) northwest	41.857656 N, 128.274726 E
Hyangsan Residence	Hyangsan county (North Pyongan)	15 km (9.3 mi) southeast	39.971916 N, 126.321648 E
Anju Residence	Anju (South Pyongan)	13 km (8.1 mi) east	39.635202 N, 125.810313 E
Changsong Residence	Changsong county (North Pyongan)	9 km (5.6 mi) west	40.440384 N, 125.118192 E
Ragwon Residence	Ragwon county (South Hamgyong)	5 km (3.1 mi) south	39.857744 N, 127.780674 E

== See also ==
- Official residence
- North Korean leaders' trains
- North Korea Uncovered
- List of leaders of North Korea
- Blue House - the southern equivalent in the Republic of Korea
