= Ryongdam concentration camp =

Prison camp in North Korea

Coordinates: 39.362°N 127.264°E

Location of Yongdam camp in North Korea

Kyo-hwa-so No. 8 Yongdam (용담 8호 교화소) is an alleged "reeducation camp" with c. 3,000 prisoners in Kangwon, North Korea.

== See also ==
- Human Rights in North Korea
- Kaechon concentration camp
