= Chongori concentration camp =

Reeducation camp in North Korea

Coordinates: 42°12′36″N 129°45′13″E

- Chosŏn'gŭl: 전거리 제12호 교화소
- Hancha: 全巨里第十二號敎化所
- Revised Romanization: Jeongeori Je12ho Gyohwaso
- McCune–Reischauer: Chŏn'gŏri Che12ho Kyohwaso
- Chosŏn'gŭl: 전거리 정치범 수용소
- Hancha: 全巨里政治犯收容所
- Revised Romanization: Jeongeori Jeongchibeom Suyongso
- McCune–Reischauer: Chŏn'gŏri Chŏngch'ibŏm Suyongso

Chongori concentration camp (also spelled Jungeori, Jongori or Jeonger-ri) is a reeducation camp in North Korea. The official name of the camp is Kyo-hwa-so No. 12 (Reeducation camp no. 12).

== Location ==
According to the United States government, Chongori is located near Chongori, a little village in Musan-ri (Korean: 무산리; RR: Musanri; MR: Musanri), Hoeryong county, at the road and railroad almost halfway between Hoeryong and Chongjin, North Hamgyong province in North Korea. Chongori camp is situated at the end of a small valley 2.5 km (1.6 mi) southeast from the main valley in Pungsan-ri (Korean: 풍산리; RR: Pungsanri; MR: P'ungsanri) and Chongori.

Location of Chongori camp in North Korea

== Description ==
Chongori concentration camp is a large prison compound, around 350 m (1,150 ft) long and 150 m (490 ft) wide. The main section is surrounded by a 8 m (26 ft) high wall, while the branch offices are surrounded by barbed wire and an electrified fence. In 2005 the camp contained around 2000 prisoners, mostly non-political criminals, but they were often forced to serve their sentences there as punishment for desperate offences such as stealing food. They are guarded by around 300 prison guards, all of whom are armed with machine guns. From 2006 onward, the number of prisoners significantly increased, because many defectors who were deported from China were arrested and imprisoned in Chongori camp. Theoretically, prisoners should be released after they have completed reeducation through labour and served their full sentences, but because their prison sentences are very long and the camp's living conditions are very harsh, many prisoners do not survive their prison sentences. A former prisoner estimates, that during his eight months of detention, around 800 prisoners died because they were forced to do hard labour and they were only given sub-subsistence level food rations.

== Purpose ==
The main purpose of Chongori camp is to punish people for usual crimes or political crimes such as illegal border crossings. The prisoners are also used as slave laborers, and as a result, they are forced to do hard and dangerous work for 14 hours a day. There is a copper ore mine, a logging section, a furniture factory and a farming section in the camp.

== Human rights situation ==
The prisoners in Chongori concentration camp live in crowded, dirty, insect-infested rooms without heating, while there is just one washing room for 1000 prisoners. Because of these bad hygienic conditions, in the summer of 2003, around 190 prisoners died of an infectious disease according to Lee Jun Ha. 70 prisoners sleep in a room which is only designed to hold 20 people, lying on the floor without pillows or blankets.

Prisoners only get 140 grams of rice three times a day, while they are being forced to do hard labour such as logging with iron chains. Often, prisoners are killed or they are crippled in work accidents, because they have to do dangerous work with primitive means. A former prisoner reported that accidental deaths occurred every few days in the furniture factory because its machines were antiquated and prisoners seldom slept more than five hours per night. Virtually every day after work and before they receive their dinner, prisoners are forced to engage in mutual criticism sessions and they receive less food as punishment for flaws or shortcomings. Because prisoners are so hungry, they even eat grass and corn which is mixed with cow feces. Lee Jun Ha estimates that around 30 to 40 people died as a result of malnutrition, work accidents or torture each month and their bodies were burnt on a nearby mountain.

Prisoners are regularly subjected to beatings, torture and inhuman treatment, all of which are arbitrarily administered at the guards' discretion. When a prisoner breaks a rule, he is tortured and confined in a solitary cell, only 1 square metre (11 sq ft) in area, where he can not stretch his legs for many days or weeks. As an additional punishment, they are only given 1/3 of their usual food rations. Several times a year, summary executions were carried out as punishment for failed escape attempts.

Kwon Hyo-jin has drawn a series of pictures which show the various forms of torture which he witnessed, such as the "pigeon torture", the "crane torture", the "aeroplane torture", and the "knee joint torture." Other human rights violations and forced labour in Chongori camp are featured in further drawings which he produced for an exhibition on political prison camps in North Korea.

The camp's staff has reportedly publicly executed inmates, without due process.

== Prisoners (witnesses) ==
- Lee Jun Ha (2000–2005 in Chongori) was imprisoned because he accidentally killed his uncle.
- Kwon Hyo-jin (~2001–2008 in Chongori) was imprisoned because he helped defectors to get to China. He is an artist in ceramics, painting and calligraphy and painted drawings of his experience in Chongori camp.

== See also ==
- Human rights in North Korea
- Kaechon concentration camp
- Kwalliso
- Prisons in North Korea
