= Hyongjesan-guyok =

District of Pyongyang, North Korea

Hyŏngjesan-guyŏk 형제산구역
- Guyŏk of Pyongyang

Korean transcription(s)
  - Hanja: 兄弟山區域
  - McCune-Reischauer: Hyŏngjesan-guyŏk
  - Revised Romanization: Hyeongjaesanguyeok
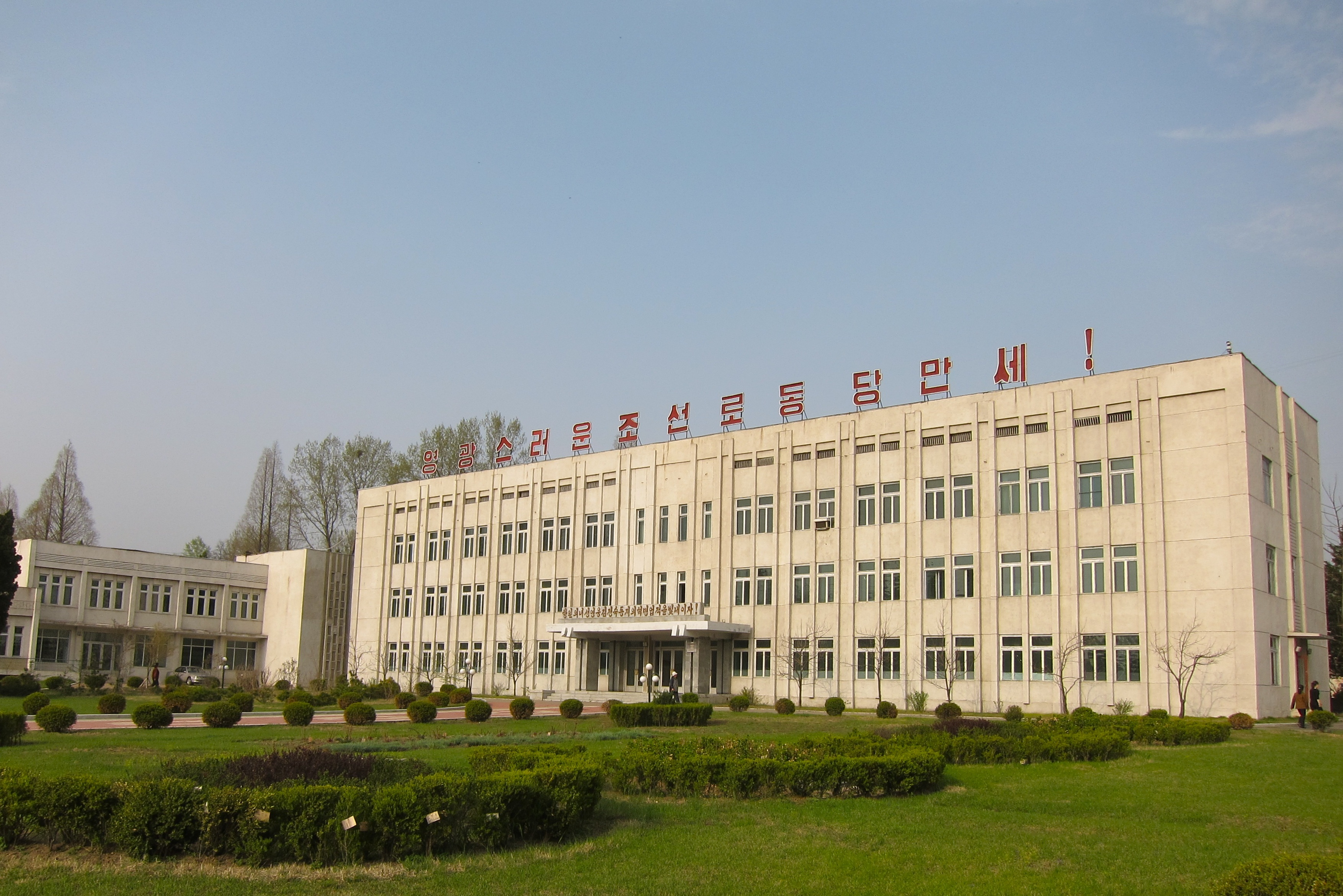
- Korean Art Film Studio

- Location of Hyeongjesan-guyok within Pyongyang
- Coordinates: 39°06′40″N 125°42′40″E
- Country: North Korea
- Direct-administered city: P'yŏngyang-Chikhalsi

Area
  - Total: 82.29 km^{2} (31.77 sq mi)

Population (2008)
  - Total: 160,032
  - Density: 1,945/km^{2} (5,037/sq mi)

- Hyongjesan-guyok
- Hangul: 형제산구역
- Hanja: 兄弟山區域
- Revised Romanization: Hyeongjaesanguyeok
- McCune–Reischauer: Hyŏngjesan-guyŏk

Hyŏngjesan-guyŏk, or Hyŏngjesan District is one of the 19 guyok which constitute the city of Pyongyang, North Korea.

== Administrative divisions ==
Hyŏngjesan-guyŏk is divided into 15 tong (neighbourhoods) and 3 ri (villages):

- Chungdan-dong 중당동 (中堂洞)
- Hadan 1-dong 하당 1동 (下堂 1洞)
- Hadan 2-dong 하당 2동 (下堂 2洞)
- Haksan-dong 학산동 (鶴山洞)
- Sangdang-dong 상당동 (上堂洞)
- Simmi-ri 신미리 (新美里)
- Sin'gan 1-dong 신간 1동 (新間 1洞)
- Sin'gan 2-dong 신간 2동 (新間 2洞)
- Sin'gan 3-dong 신간 3동 (新間 3洞)
- Sŏkchŏn-dong 석전동 (石田洞)
- Sŏp'o 1-dong 서포 1동 (西浦 1洞)
- Sŏp'o 2-dong 서포 2동 (西浦 2洞)
- Sŏp'o 3-dong 서포 3동 (西浦 3洞)
- Sŏryong-dong 서룡동 (西龍洞)
- Sŏsan-dong 서산동 (西山洞)
- Ch'ŏnnam-ri 천남리 (川南里)
- Chesal-li 제산리 (弟山里)
- Hyŏngsal-li 형산리 (兄山里)

== Mountains ==
- Hyongjesan
