= Taehung concentration camp =

Prison camp in North Korea

- Hangul: 대흥수용소
- RR: Daeheung suyongso
- MR: Taehŭng suyongso

The Taehŭng concentration camp is a North Korean prison camp for political dissidents and those who have committed economic crimes. It is located in the Kŏmdŏk district (chigu) of Tanch'ŏn-si, South Hamgyong province in eastern North Korea. It has been reported that a number of North Korean nationals who have traveled to sporting events abroad have, on their return, been imprisoned for speaking about their experiences in other countries, particularly South Korea.

== See also ==
- Human rights in North Korea
- Politics of North Korea
