= Lee Soon-ok =

North Korean activist and former political prisoner

- Hangul: 이순옥
- RR: I Sunok
- MR: I Sunok

Lee Soon-ok (born 1947 in Chongjin, North Korea) is a North Korean defector and the author of Eyes of the Tailless Animals: Prison Memoirs of a North Korean Woman, her account of being falsely accused, tortured, and imprisoned under poor conditions for crimes against the state and her subsequent release from prison and defection from the country. Since leaving North Korea, she has resided in South Korea. Lee's testimony was challenged by the North Korean Defectors' Association in Seoul and by many former North Korea citizens.

== Imprisonment ==
According to Lee, she was a manager in a North Korean government office that distributed goods and materials to the country's people when she was falsely accused of dishonesty in her job. She believes she was one of the victims of a power struggle between the Workers' Party and the public security bureau police.

She describes being severely tortured and threatened for months following her arrest while maintaining her innocence; however, a promise made by an interrogator to not take any punitive action against her husband and son if she confessed—a promise that she said she would find out to have been false—finally convinced her to plead guilty to the charges.

For six years, Lee was imprisoned in Kaechon concentration camp where she reports witnessing forced abortions, infanticide, instances of rape, public executions, testing of biological weapons on prisoners (see human experimentation in North Korea), extreme malnutrition, and other forms of inhumane conditions and depravity.

It is not clear why she was released, although Lee suspects that the officials responsible for jailing her were the subjects of investigations by higher-ranking members of North Korea's government.

== Defection ==
Following her release, Lee wrote several letters of protest to North Korean leader Kim Jong-il about her cruel treatment in the camp but never received a response and was eventually threatened with unspecified consequences if she wrote any more letters. She managed to reunite with her son and escape from North Korea soon afterward, converting to Christianity along the way. Her husband disappeared during her imprisonment and she has not heard from him since.

Since escaping with her son via China to South Korea in 1995, Lee has written Eyes of the Tailless Animals: Prison Memoirs of a North Korean Woman, a memoir of her six-year imprisonment on false charges in Kaechon concentration camp and testified before the US Congress. She estimated that in her camp alone there were at least 6,000 political prisoners. Lee says she has been partially disabled due to the physical torture she was subjected to for well over a year, including but not limited to water torture.

Along with fellow North Korean prison camp internees Kang Chol-Hwan and An Hyuk (both were in Yodok concentration camp), she received the Democracy Award from the American non-profit organization National Endowment for Democracy in July 2003.

== Reception ==
Lee's accusations of human experimentation in North Korea have been described as "very plausible" by a senior US official quoted anonymously by NBC News. The authenticity of some of Lee's accounts of North Korean prison camps have been questioned by some South Korean researchers and North Korean defectors.

== See also ==
- Shin Dong-hyuk
- Yeonmi Park
- Human rights in North Korea
- Freedom of religion in North Korea
