= Sinŭiju North Korean Leader's Residence =

Residence of Kim Jong-Un

Coordinates: 40°04′53″N 124°29′58″E

Location of Sinuiju Residence in North Korea

The Sinŭiju North Korean Leader's Residence (Korean: 신의주 관저; Hanja: 新義州 官邸), which may locally be known as the Central Luxury House or Central Luxury Residence, is one of the many official residences of North Korean leader and Workers' Party of Korea's general secretary Kim Jong-Un. He reportedly took over the residence from his father, Kim Jong Il after the elder Kim's death in 2011. The residence is located near Sinŭiju, in the North P'yŏngan province of North Korea. Public knowledge about the residence came to light through the North Korea Uncovered project.

== See also ==
- North Korean leader's residences
- Official residence
- Ryongsong Residence
