= Eyes of the Tailless Animals =

Book by Lee Soon-ok

Eyes of the Tailless Animals: Prison Memoirs of a North Korean Woman
- Author: Lee Soon-ok
- Original title: 꼬리 없는 짐승들의 눈빛
- Language: Korean
- Genre: Memoir
- Publication date: 1996

Eyes of the Tailless Animals: Prison Memoirs of a North Korean Woman (Korean: 꼬리 없는 짐승들의 눈빛) is a 1999 book that recounts the experiences of former North Korean political prison survivor and refugee Lee Soon-ok. The title reflects the author's view that she and other prisoners were treated like animals, albeit animals that had no tail.

Lee’s story was published in South Korea in 1996 in the original Korean. Her story was subsequently translated into English and published in the United States in 1999. Lee has also testified about the North Korean human rights situation before the United States Congress, and advocated for the cause of Christians in North Korea.

== Overview of the book ==
Lee relates how that at one point she was a senior member of the Korean Worker's Party in her home province of North Hamgyong, but was later detained on what she claims were false charges. For more than a year she was tortured in a prison until she at last confessed, just so she could be released from the torture. She was then tried, convicted, and transferred to Kaechon reeducation camp to serve a 13-year term.

Upon entering the prison, Lee was told she must forget she was even human if she were to survive. The memoirs graphically detail torture and human rights abuses during her incarceration, which are corroborated by Kang Chol-Hwan. Since she had been educated in accounting, she was assigned to some accounting work for the work camp. By doing her assigned work well and earning the respect of the prison administrators, after five years in the Kaechon prison, Lee was released, in 1992. She was unable to find her husband, but with her son she took the commonest route to South Korea. She clandestinely walked across the frozen Tumen River on the North Korean-Chinese border. In China, she was considered an illegal immigrant. Chinese policy is to deport illegal entrants back to North Korea, where they are usually imprisoned for leaving the country without a rarely given passport. Lee records how she eventually made her way to South Korea, where defectors from North Korea are cautiously welcomed. Since obtaining residence in South Korea, Lee converted to Christianity. She has since worked to raise awareness about the Kim regime, particularly in respect of freedom of religion.

== See also ==
- Human rights in North Korea
- Kaechon concentration camp
- Persecution of Christians in North Korea
- Human experimentation in North Korea

== Bibliography ==
- Lee, Soon Ok. Eyes of the Tailless Animals: Prison Memoirs of a North Korean Woman. Living Sacrifice Book Co, 1999, ISBN 978-0-88264-335-9
- Made in North Korea. Harper's Magazine; Nov2002, Vol. 305 Issue 1830, p20, 3p
