= Human experimentation in North Korea =

Human experimentation is an issue raised by some North Korean defectors and former prisoners. They have described suffocation of prisoners in gas chambers, testing deadly chemical weapons and surgery without anesthesia.

== Sources ==
Human experimentation in North Korea has been described by several North Korean defectors, including former prisoner Lee Soon-ok, former prison guards Kwon Hyok and Ahn Myung-chul, and others. In Lee's testimony to the U.S. Senate and in her prison memoir Eyes of the Tailless Animals (published in 1999) she recounted witnessing two instances of lethal human experimentation. An episode of the BBC television programme This World detailed some of the allegations. The accusations have been described as "very plausible" by a senior US official quoted anonymously by NBC News. Lee's accounts have been questioned by Chang In-suk, former head of the North Korean Defectors’ Association in Seoul, as well as a number of former North Korean citizens on NKnet who believed that Lee's accounts were "unlikely to be true".

== Testing of deadly poisons ==
Lee described an experiment in which 50 healthy female prisoners were selected and given poisoned cabbage leaves. All of the women were required to eat the cabbage, despite cries of distress from those who had already eaten. All 50 died after 20 minutes of vomiting blood and anal bleeding. Refusing to eat the cabbage would allegedly have meant reprisals against them and their families.

Kwon Hyok, who has stated he was a former head of security at Camp 22, described laboratories equipped with glass gas chambers for suffocation gas experiments, in which three or four people, normally a family, are the experimental subjects. After the people undergo medical checks, the chambers are sealed and poison is injected through a tube, while scientists observe from above through glass. In a report reminiscent of an earlier account of a family of seven, Kwon claims to have watched one family of two parents, a son and a daughter die from suffocating gas, with the parents trying to save the children using mouth-to-mouth resuscitation for as long as they had the strength. Dr. Kim, a chemist who led these experiments before defecting from North Korea, confirmed these reports and stated that the experiments' purposes included observing the poison gas's effects on victims' mental state and determining how much gas would be needed to kill everyone in an area.

Kwon's testimony was supported by documents from Camp 22 describing the transfer of prisoners designated for the experiments; the documents were identified as genuine by Kim Sang-hun, a London-based expert on Korea and human rights activist. Toxicologist Alastair Hay stated that Kim's testimony is detailed and scientifically accurate enough that it is likely to be true. A press conference in Pyongyang, organized by North Korean authorities, denounced the allegations and claimed that the corroborating documents had been forged. Shin Eon-sang, South Korea's Assistant Minister for Unification Policy, stated that "[t]he authenticity of the evidence is difficult to assess" because North Korean defectors' "claims are in most cases exaggerated." Kwon's account was also questioned by the Yonhap News Agency based in South Korea, which argued he had never served in a political prison and had no access to the information he claimed. Kwon and Kim claim that the South Korean National Intelligence Service told them not to talk about North Korean human experimentation to avoid harming South Korea's relations with North Korea, and harassed them and denied them passports when they refused.

== Other experiments ==
Former prison guard Ahn Myung-chul has reported that young doctors practice surgeries on prisoners without anesthesia.

== See also ==
- Illicit activities of North Korea

International

- Poison laboratory of the Soviet secret services
- Nazi human experimentation
- Project MKUltra
- Unit 731
- Unethical human experimentation
