= Chosun Journal =

Former American website on North Korea

The Chosun Journal or ChosunJournal.com was an independent, non-profit website based in New York that networked communities for human rights in North Korea. It was started in February 2001 by three Christian Korean Americans (Editor Edward Kim, Jeff Park, and Jay Lee) and purported to be North Korea's first virtual holocaust museum set in real-time.

In addition to serving as a portal to the latest news related to North Korean human rights, the journal networked rescuers, refugees, defectors, government officials, intelligentsia, and the media to bring further momentum to the North Korean human rights movement. It had been a resource for academic journals and bestselling books like Natan Sharansky’s The Case for Democracy.

The Journal was premised on the belief that the more people know about the human rights atrocities happening in North Korea, the more pressure the world will bring to bear on the Stalinist regime, resulting in less leeway for the regime to continue abusing the 21 million North Korean people with impunity. It had hosted survivors of North Korean concentration camps to share their testimonies at U.S. college campuses and churches, and was also reportedly behind the asylum of four North Korean refugees via an underground railroad.

Other journal activities involved lobbying government bodies to pass bills that assist persecuted North Korean refugees hiding in China, and petitioning officials to grant leniency to those that are caught seeking asylum.
