= Oro concentration camp =

North Korean concentration camp for political prisoners

Coordinates: 40°1′51″N 127°45′57″E

Location of Oro camp in North Korea

Kyo-hwa-so No. 22 Oro (오로22호 교화소) is a "reeducation camp" with c. 1,000 prisoners in South Hamgyong, North Korea.

== See also ==
- Human rights in North Korea
- Kaechon concentration camp
