= Kaechon concentration camp =

Kaechon concentration camp may refer to:

- Kaechon internment camp, a political prison camp (kwalliso), North Korea
- Kaechon prison camp, a 're-education' prison camp, North Korea
