= Chungsan County =

Chŭngsan County 증산군
- County

Korean transcription(s)
  - Chosŏn'gŭl: 증산군
  - Hancha: 甑山郡
  - McCune-Reischauer: Chŭngsan-gun
  - Revised Romanization: Jeungsan-gun
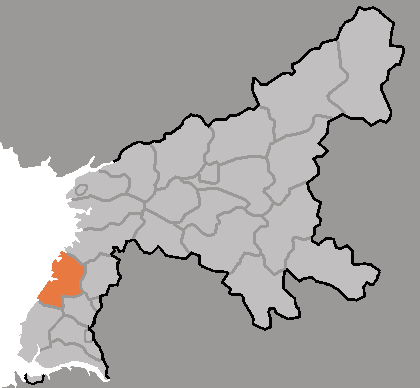
- Map of South Pyongan showing the location of Chungsan
- Country: North Korea
- Province: South P'yŏngan
- Administrative divisions: 1 ŭp, 17 ri

Area
  - Total: 346.32 km^{2} (133.71 sq mi)

Population (2008)
  - Total: 113,613
  - Density: 328.06/km^{2} (849.67/sq mi)

Chŭngsan County is a kun (county) in South Pyongan Province, North Korea.

Re-education Camp No. 11, a large prison mostly for repatriated refugees, is located in the northwestern part of Chŭngsan County.

== History ==
The region was originally known as "Sirumoe(a mountain that looks like earthen ware for steaming food)". This korean name was sinicized as jeungsan(甑山) when the subdivision of Jeungsanhyang(甑山鄕) was installed under the Kangso prefecture in 1136(before this the region was considered part of west Gyeonggi).In 1395, Jeungsanhyang became a prefecture in its own right and became Jeungsan prefecture.In 1914, the county became a myeon under Kangso county and some of the areas that were part of the county were merged into Pyongwon County. After being under Kangso County for a while, the Chungsan County was recreated in 1952.

== Administrative divisions ==
Chŭngsan county is divided into 1 ŭp (town) and 17 ri (villages):

- Chŭngsan-ŭp (증산읍/甑山邑)
- Chŏksong-ri (적송리/赤松里)
- Chŏngsal-li (청산리/靑山里)
- Hamjung-ri (함종리/咸從里)
- Iap-ri (이압리/二鴨里)
- Kŭmsong-ri (금송리/金宋里)
- Kwangje-ri (광제리/廣濟里)
- Manp'ung-ri (만풍리/万豊里)
- Mubol-li (무본리/務本里)
- Mundong-ri (문동리/文洞里)
- Palsal-li (발산리/鉢山里)
- P'ungjŏng-ri (풍정리/豊井里)
- Raksaeng-ri (락생리/樂生里)
- Rimsŏng-ri (림성리/林城里)
- Ryongdŏng-ri (룡덕리/龍德里)
- Sach'ŏl-li (사천리/沙川里)
- Sinhŭng-ri (신흥리/新興里)
- Sŏkta-ri (석다리/石多里)

== Transportation ==
Chŭngsan county is served by the Namdong Branch of the Korean State Railway's P'yŏngnam Line.
