= Kangdong County =

Kangdong County 강동군
- County

Korean transcription(s)
  - Hanja: 江東郡
  - McCune-Reischauer: Kangdong-gun
  - Revised Romanization: Gangdong-gun
- Location of Kangdong County within Pyongyang
- Coordinates: 39°05′27″N 126°08′12″E
- Country: North Korea
- Direct-administered city: P'yŏngyang-Chikhalsi

Area
  - Total: 536.1 km^{2} (207.0 sq mi)

Population (2008)
  - Total: 221,539
  - Density: 413.2/km^{2} (1,070/sq mi)

Kangdong County is one of Pyongyang's two suburban counties. In 1983 it was separated from South P'yongan Province and assumed direct governance by the Pyongyang City People's Committee. It is bordered by Sŏngch'ŏn-gun (Songchon County), South P'yongan in the north and east, Sŭngho-guyŏk (Sungho District) from the south and the Taedong River from the west.

Kangdong-gun is best known as the location of the supposed Tomb of King Tangun, the Revolutionary Site at Ponghwa-ri. Kim Jong-un's Kangdong Residence is located near the banks of Taedong River. The northeastern part of the county hosts the offices and facilities of the Second Economic Committee, which is the DPRK's weapons industry. Kyo-hwa-so No. 4 is a large reeducation camp in the south eastern part of Kangdong-gun.

== Administrative divisions ==
Kangdong County is divided into 1 ŭp (town), 6 rodongjagu (workers' districts) and 16 ri (villages):

- Kangdong-ŭp (강동읍)
- Hari-rodongjagu (하리로동자구
- Hŭngryŏng-rodongjagu (흑령로동자구)
- Kobi-rodongjagu (고비로동자구)
- Namgang-rodongjagu (남강로동자구)
- Songga-rodongjagu (송가로동자구)
- Taeri-rodongjagu (대리로동자구)
- Hwagang-ri (화강리)
- Hyangmong-ri (향목리)
- Kubil-ri (구빈리)
- Kyŏngsil-ri (경신리)
- Maekchŏl-ri (맥전리)
- Munhŭng-ri (문흥리)
- Munhwa-ri (문화리)
- Myŏngŭi-ri (명의리)
- Ponghwa-ri (봉화리)
- Ransal-ri (란산리)
- Ryonghŭng-ri (룡흥리)
- Samdŭng-ri (삼등리)
- Sonsŏng-ri (송석리)
- Sunch'ang-ri (순창리)
- Tong-ri (동리)
- T'aejang-ri (태장리)
