= Sunghori concentration camp =

Labor camp in North Korea

- Chosŏn'gŭl: 승호리
- Hancha: 勝湖里
- Revised Romanization: Seungho-ri
- McCune–Reischauer: Sŭnghori

The Sŭnghori concentration camp was a labor camp for political prisoners which was located in North Hwanghae Province, North Korea, about 70 kilometers from Pyongyang.

Little is known about it as its inmates were considered 'irredeemables' and never released. Sunghori is described by North Korean refugees and defectors as one of North Korea's most feared labor camps, where approximately 21,000 inmates live and work in terrible conditions. Kang Chol-hwan described it as a "camp of no return." Prisoners, including Kang's grandfather, who were sent there, would almost never be released. Kang did meet one prisoner who was transferred to his own camp, who described Sŭnghori prisoners being worked as coal miners. According to Kang, the camp was closed after a report by Amnesty International.

== See also ==
- Human rights in North Korea
