= Human rights in North Korea =

The human rights record of North Korea is marked by significant and repeated human rights violations. Groups such as Human Rights Watch, the United Nations and Freedom House have condemned its human rights record as one of the worst in the world. Amnesty International considers North Korea to have no contemporary parallel with respect to violations of liberty.

North Korean citizens do not have free speech, with only media providers operated by the government being legal and a lack of private media providers. According to reports from Amnesty International and the U.S. Committee for Human Rights in North Korea, by 2017 an estimated 200,000 prisoners were incarcerated in camps for political crimes, and were subjected to forced labour, physical abuse, torture, and execution.

The North Korean government strictly monitors the activities of foreign visitors. Aid workers are subjected to considerable scrutiny and are excluded from certain places and regions the government does not want them to enter. Since North Korean citizens cannot travel freely through their own country or travel abroad, the nation's human rights record has mostly been constructed from stories from refugees and defectors. The government's position, expressed through the Korean Central News Agency, is that international criticism of its human rights record is a pretext for overthrowing its Juche-based system, while the abuses of its critics go unpunished.

The General Assembly of the United Nations has since 2003 annually adopted a resolution condemning the country's human rights record. The resolution of December 19, 2011, passed by a vote of 123–16 with 51 abstentions, urged the government in Pyongyang to end its "systematic, widespread and grave violations of human rights", which included public executions and arbitrary detentions. North Korea rejected the resolution, saying it was politically motivated and based upon untrue fabrications. In February 2014, a UN special commission published a detailed, 400-page account based on first-hand testimonies documenting "unspeakable atrocities" committed by the North Korean government.

== Commission of Inquiry on Human Rights in the Democratic People's Republic of Korea ==
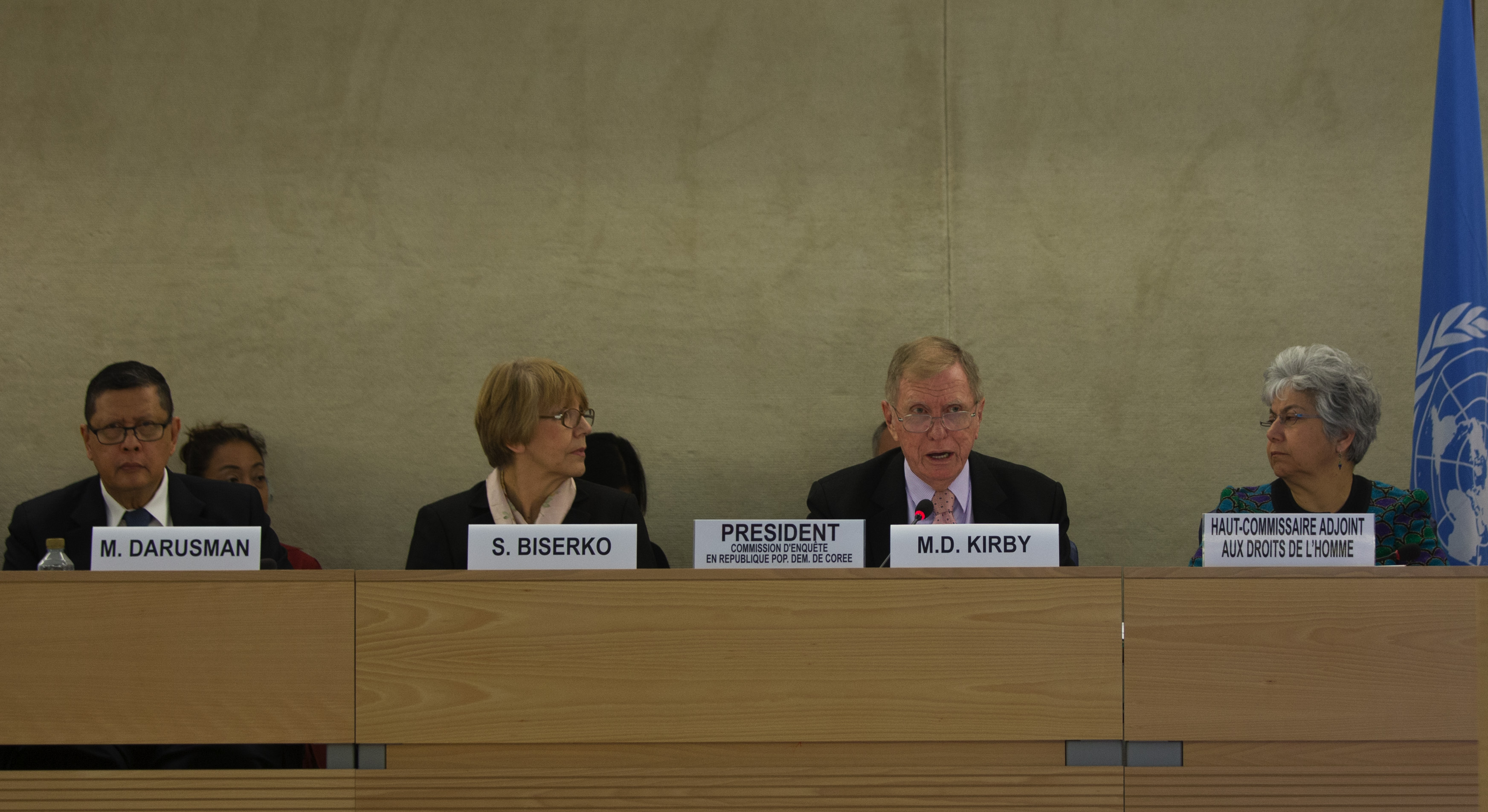
Commissioners Marzuki Darusman, Sonja Biserko, and Michael Donald Kirby (Chair) present their report to the UN Human Rights Council

On May 6, 2013, the United Nations Human Rights Council announced an appointment of Michael Kirby of Australia, Sonja Biserko of Serbia, and Marzuki Darusman of Indonesia as members of the United Nations Commission of Inquiry on Human Rights in the Democratic People's Republic of Korea.

[The] commission of inquiry will investigate the systematic, widespread and grave violations of human rights in the Democratic People's Republic of Korea ... including the violation of the right to food, the violations associated with prison camps, torture and inhumane treatment, arbitrary detention, discrimination, violations of freedom of expression, violations of the right to life, violations of freedom of movement, and enforced disappearances, including in the form of abductions of nationals of other States, with a view to ensuring full accountability, in particular where these violations may amount to crimes against humanity.

On August 20, 2013, the commission began five days of public hearings at Yonsei University in Seoul, South Korea receiving testimony from defectors, and on August 29, 2013, in Japan from relatives of Japanese citizens abducted by North Korea in the 1970s and 1980s. North Korea describes the inquiry as "a political plot" and it has not given investigators access to the country. The UN panel interviewed witnesses in South Korea, Japan, and the UK, and it also conducted hearings in the U.S. on October 30 and 31, 2013. The commission said it has consistently asked North Korean representatives to take part in the public hearings and question witnesses.

On February 17, 2014, the panel published its findings in a 400-page report. The commission accused the North Korean government of being involved in systemic, widespread and gross human rights violations. The panel chairman Michael Kirby described some acts by stating that they resembled those committed by the Nazis.

In many instances, the violations of human rights found by the commission constitute crimes against humanity. These are not mere excesses of the State; they are essential components of a political system that has moved far from the ideals on which it claims to be founded. The gravity, scale and nature of these violations revealed a State that does not have any parallel in the contemporary world.

Roberta Cohen, joint chair of the Committee for Human Rights in North Korea, said it was now up to the world community to take action to protect those persecuted and bring the perpetrators to justice. The DPRK rejected the findings. In a statement it said the commission was "a product of politicization of human rights on the part of the EU and Japan, in alliance with the US hostile policy". On November 18, 2014, the UN voted in favor of a draft resolution to refer North Korea to the International Criminal Court for crimes against humanity.

== Position of the DPRK ==
Human-rights discourse in North Korea has a history that predates the establishment of the state in 1948. Based on Marxist theory, Confucian tradition, and the Juche idea, North Korean human-rights theory regards rights as conditional rather than universal, holds that collective rights take priority over individual rights, and that welfare and subsistence rights are important.

Kim Il Sung argued that holding political prisoners and democracy are not mutually exclusive, and that he valued democracy. The punishment of actively anti-social or anti-socialist persons is instead argued as a means to protect the country's democracy from those who wish to abuse it.

Our communists are not hiding the Party's identity or class-consciousness in implementing democracy. Socialist democracy is not supra-class democracy that can provide freedom and rights to hostile elements who oppose socialism or impure elements who act against the interests of the People. The type of democracy which can guarantee freedom and rights to the People, including workers, peasants, and the working intelligentsia and at the same time which can punish a small number of class enemies, is the type of socialist democracy we have in our country.

The government of North Korea claims that the Constitution of the DPRK guarantees the human rights of its people, and that these guarantees are fully elaborated in its laws and regulations. It claims that these human-rights guarantees and laws are strictly enforced throughout the country and with respect to every individual.

Seven months after the release of the Commission of Inquiry report, North Korea released its own DPRK Association for Human Rights Studies report, which claims that North Koreans enjoy "genuine human rights". North Korea also agreed to implement 113 of the 268 recommendations to improve its human rights performance made at the UN Human Rights Council's Universal Periodic Review process. Kirby cited North Korea's participation in the Universal Periodic Review, the country's publication of their own human rights report, and Hwang Pyong-so's visit to the 2014 Asian Games a "charm offensive" and expressed skepticism about whether the North Korean government has become genuinely concerned about human rights or is simply preparing for imminent criticism in the UN. Kirby welcomed parts of the DPRK Association for Human Rights Studies report as "fair comment" but noted that it fails to discuss the issues raised in the Commission of Inquiry report.

== Civil liberties and law ==
North Korea's founder Kim Il Sung rejected the concept of civil rights for people who oppose the regime. There is an extensive system of informants throughout North Korea which monitor Koreans with respect to political and other possible infractions without reference to formal civil rights.

The Office of the United Nations High Commissioner for Human Rights (OHCHR) has officially acknowledged the widespread human rights violations that regularly occur in North Korea. United Nations' Human Rights Resolution 2005/11 referred to specific types of abuses within North Korea:

Torture and other cruel, inhuman or degrading treatment or punishment, public executions, extrajudicial and arbitrary detention, the absence of due process and the rule of law, imposition of the death penalty for political reasons, the existence of a large number of prison camps and the extensive use of forced labour;

Sanctions on citizens of the Democratic People's Republic of Korea who have been repatriated from abroad, such as treating their departure as treason leading to punishments of internment, torture, inhuman or degrading treatment, or the death penalty;

All-pervasive and severe restrictions on the freedoms of thought, conscience, religion, opinion and expression, peaceful assembly and association and on the access of everyone to information, and limitations imposed on every person who wishes to move freely within the country and travel abroad;

Continued violation of the human rights and fundamental freedoms of women, in particular the trafficking of women for prostitution or forced marriage, ethnically motivated forced abortions, including by labour-inducing injection or natural delivery, as well as infanticide of children of repatriated mothers, including in police detention centres and labour training camps.

=== Labor rights ===
North Korea is one of the few nations in the world that does not belong to the International Labour Organization (ILO). However, ILO conventions are considered international labor standards, regardless of ratification. The ruling Korean Workers' Party firmly controls the only authorized trade union organization, the General Federation of Trade Unions of Korea.

Forced labor at the behest of the government has been institutionalized. Children (some as young as 11) are forced to work on farms and construction sites at the behest of the government, and may be demanded to collect scrap metals and other materials by schools to be sold. Children are also required to do landscaping work such as cleaning riversides and planting trees. The labor can be intensive and children living in the country's kwalliso (detention camps) are also forced to engage in heavy work.

A report by the Office of the United Nations High Commissioner for Human Rights on forced labor in North Korea concluded that North Koreans are exploited by an extensive multi-layered system of forced labor directed towards the interests of the state rather than the people and which is a means for the government to control, monitor, and indoctrinate the population. The report found that the institutionalized forced labor system begins with children still in school and continues into adulthood. Military conscripts are routinely forced to work in agriculture and construction. After completing school and military service, North Koreans are assigned their jobs by the state, with no free choice of work, and may still be mobilized into "shock brigades" to carry out manual labor, often in agriculture and construction, for little or no pay. North Koreans carrying out forced labor are subjected to poor working conditions without pay, and are subjected to beatings with women also at risk of sexual violence. The report found widespread abuses in the exploitation of prisoners for labor to the extent that it could constitute slavery.

=== Freedom of speech and assembly ===
The North Korean constitution has clauses nominally guaranteeing the freedoms of speech and assembly. In practice, other clauses take precedence, including the requirement that citizens follow a socialist way of life. Criticism of the government and its leaders is strictly curtailed and making such statements can be cause for arrest and consignment to one of North Korea's "re-education" camps.

There are numerous civic organizations, but all of them appear to be operated by the government. All routinely praise the government and perpetuate the personality cults of the Kim family. Defectors indicate that the promotion of the cult of personality is one of the primary functions of almost all films, plays, and books produced within the country.

=== Freedom of information ===
Information about the outside world is strictly curtailed. All but a minuscule minority of North Korean citizens are prohibited from using the Internet. The government maintains an intranet called Kwangmyong which is disconnected from the global Internet. The government distributes all radio and television sets; citizens are forbidden to alter them to make it possible to receive broadcasts from other nations; doing so carries severe penalties. Consumption of foreign media is strictly prohibited and can even be punished by execution.

=== Freedom of religion ===
The North Korean constitution nominally protects religious freedom, as long as it is not used to harm the state or the social order. However, in practice, there is no genuine religious freedom, and the government severely restricts religious activity except if it is supervised by government organizations.

Reports from refugee, defector, missionary, and nongovernmental organizations state that individuals engaging in proselytizing, with ties to overseas evangelical groups operating in China, or who have been repatriated from China and found to have been in contact with foreigners or missionaries are likely to be arrested and harshly penalized.

Refugees and defectors allege that they witnessed the arrests and execution of members of underground Christian churches by the regime. Due to the country's inaccessibility and the inability to gain timely information, the continuation of this activity remains difficult to verify.

==== Persecution of Christians and Buddhists ====
According to the Christian organization Open Doors, North Korea is the leader of countries which are ruled by governments which persecute Christians. Christian Solidarity Worldwide has documented numerous reports of people being sent to prison camps and subjected to torture and inhuman treatment because of their faith. It is estimated that 50,000–70,000 Christians are held in North Korean prison camps. There are reports of public executions of Christians. For example, Ri Hyon-ok was allegedly publicly executed in Ryongchon on June 16, 2009 for giving out Bibles, while her husband and children were deported to the Hoeryong political prison camp. If the authorities discover that North Korean refugees who have been deported from China have converted to Christianity, they subject them to harsher ill-treatment, torture, and prolonged imprisonment. The government considers religious activities political crimes, because they could challenge the personality cult and semi-deification of Kim Il Sung and his family.

From 1949 to the mid-1950s, under the rule of Kim Il Sung, all churches were closed. According to AsiaNews, all non-foreign Catholic priests were executed, and Protestant leaders who did not renounce their faith were purged as "American spies". The martyrdom of the Benedictine monks of Tokwon Abbey was documented as the process of beatification was initiated for them. Only 60 out of 400 Buddhist temples have survived the religious persecution in the 1950s. The 1,600 monks were killed, disappeared in prison camps or were forced to recant their faith. The remaining temples are now preserved as national cultural heritage. North Korean defectors reported that government-employed "monks" are serving as caretakers and tourist guides, but they did not see genuine worship. As reported, most Buddhists are afraid to openly practice their religion in the temple areas and as a result, they only practice their religion in secret. However, on special occasions, ceremonies were permitted by the authorities.

In 2002, the North Korean government estimated that the number of religious believers was 12,000 Protestants, 10,000 Buddhists and 800 Catholics, while estimates by South Korean and international church-related groups were considerably higher. In addition, the Chondoist Chongu Party, a government-approved traditional religious movement, had approximately 15,000 practitioners.

Since 1988, four church buildings have been erected in Pyongyang with foreign donations: one Catholic, two Protestant and one Russian Orthodox. However, they are only open to foreigners, and North Korean citizens cannot attend the services. The services are used to bring in foreign currency from foreign visitors, including South Koreans.

=== Freedom of movement ===
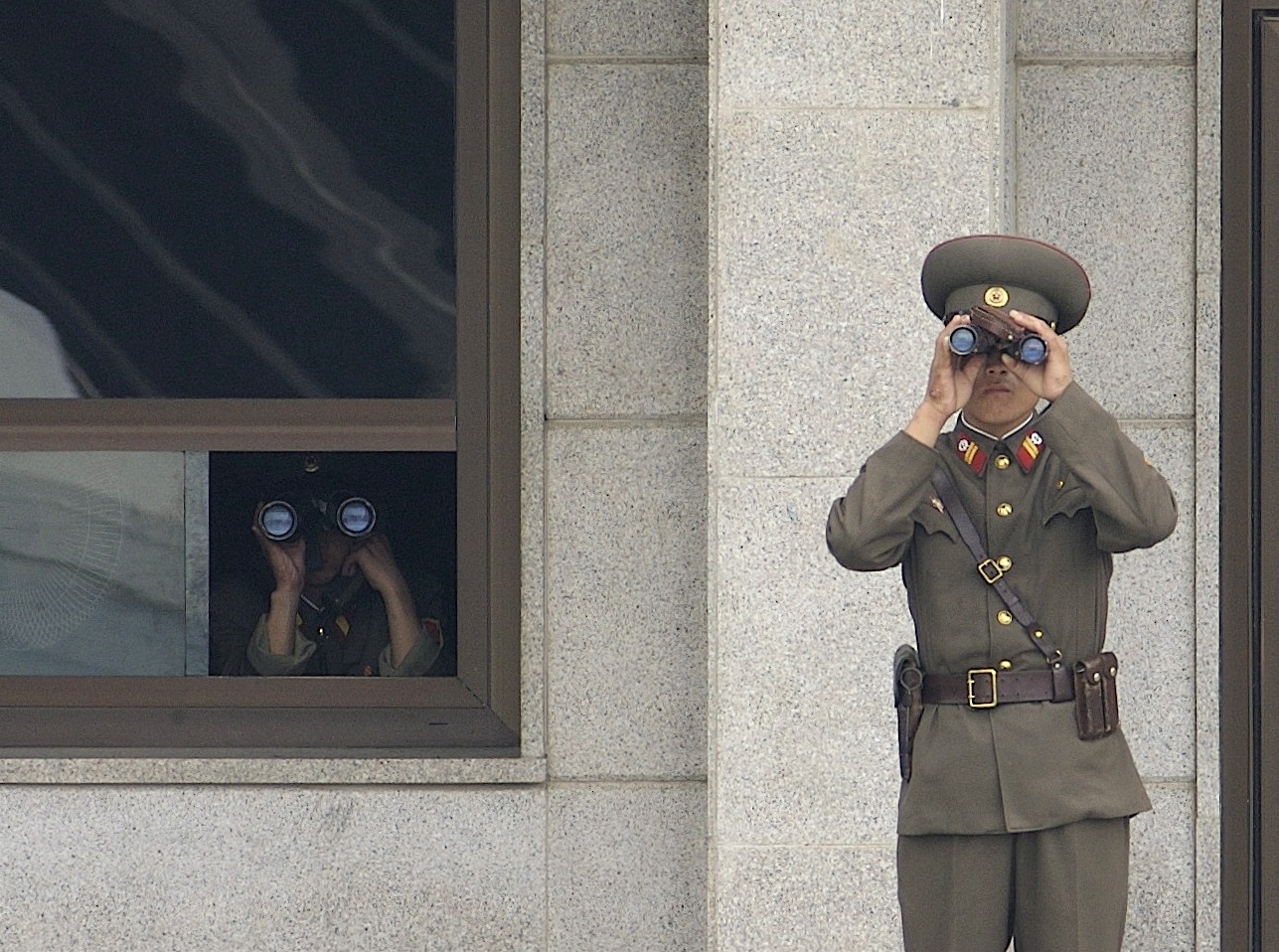
North Korean soldiers at the DMZ

North Korean citizens usually cannot freely travel within or outside the country. Emigration and immigration are strictly controlled. North Korean citizens must obtain a permit to travel outside their county of residence and upon reaching their destination report their arrival to the local authorities. According to testimony by defectors, obtaining such permits can be expedited through bribery. Forced resettlement of citizens and whole families, especially as punishment for political reasons, is said to be routine.

North Korean citizens are prohibited from leaving the country without permission, and those caught attempting to do so are harshly punished. The North Korean government treats emigrants from the country as defectors. Travel abroad is tightly controlled. The issuance of passports is heavily restricted, and those allowed to travel abroad must leave behind family members in North Korea who can be held hostage to ensure their return.

North Korean refugees who flee to China are often later forcibly repatriated back to North Korea by authorities, and are routinely beaten and sent to prison camps after repatriation. This treatment is more severe in cases where North Korean refugees have come into contact with non-governmental organizations (NGOs) that are associated with South Korea or with religions, especially Christianity. In cases where the North Korean government discovers that contact has occurred between refugees and these NGOs, the punishments for these refugees are torture and execution upon their repatriation back to North Korea.

In May 2016, Kim Jong Un temporarily banned all weddings and funerals across the country, and freedom of movement into and out of the capital, in preparation for a meeting, on 6 May, of the Workers' Party of Korea, the first gathering of its kind in 36 years.

On 28 July 2020, UN human rights reported that women detained in the Democratic People's Republic of Korea are being subjected to multiple, serious human rights violations at the hands of security and police officials. The women have been given inadequate quantity and poor quality of food, leading to extreme malnutrition.

=== Freedom of the press ===
As of 2017, North Korea occupies the last place on the Press Freedom Index published by Reporters Without Borders. The constitution of North Korea provides for freedom of the press, but in practice, all media is strictly controlled by the government. The national media is focused almost entirely on political propaganda and the promotion of the personality cults surrounding the Kim family. It emphasizes historical grievances toward the U.S. and Japan.

Reporters Without Borders claims that radio or television sets that can be bought in North Korea are preset to receive only the government frequencies and sealed with a label to prevent tampering with the equipment. It is a serious criminal offense to manipulate the sets and receive radio or television broadcasts from outside North Korea. In a party campaign in 2003, the head of each party cell in neighborhoods and villages received instructions to verify the seals on all radio sets.

As North and South Korea use different television systems (PAL and NTSC, respectively), it is not possible to view broadcasts across the border between the two countries; however, in areas bordering China, it has reportedly been possible to receive television from that country. A United Nations envoy reported that any North Korean citizen caught watching a South Korean film may be sent to a labor camp. In 2020, North Korea passed the Law on Rejecting Reactionary Ideology and Culture, which imposes penalty ranging from forced labor to death for those that want to keep or distribute cultural materials, such as TV programs, books and songs from "hostile countries," including as South Korea, Japan and the United States.

=== Minority rights ===
North Korea's population is one of the world's most ethnically homogeneous, and immigration is almost non-existent. Among the few immigrants that have willingly gone to North Korea are Japanese spouses (generally wives) of Koreans who returned from Japan from 1955 to the early 1980s. These Japanese have been forced to assimilate, and for the most part, the returnees overall are reported to have not been fully accepted into North Korean society (with a few exceptions, such as those who became part of the government), and instead ended up on the fringes. Foreigners who visit the country are generally strictly monitored by government minders and are forbidden to enter certain locations.

In 2014, after the United Nations Human Rights Council published a report on human rights in North Korea advising a referral to the International Criminal Court, the official Korean Central News Agency responded with an article that included homophobic insults against report author Michael Kirby, who is openly gay. The KCNA's article went on to state that gay marriage "can never be found in the DPRK boasting of the sound mentality and good morals, and homosexuality has become a target of public criticism even in Western countries, too. In fact, it is ridiculous for such gay [sic] to sponsor dealing with others' human rights issue."

=== Disability rights ===
As a state party to the International Covenant on Economic, Social and Cultural Rights (ICESCR) and the Convention on the Rights of the Child (CRC), North Korea has international obligations to refrain from discriminating against its people based on disability (among other criteria). Under Article 2 of the CRC, "States Parties shall respect and ensure the rights set forth in the present Convention to each child within their jurisdiction without discrimination of any kind, irrespective of the child's or their parent's or legal guardian's race, colour, sex, language, religion, political or other opinion, national, ethnic or social origin, property, disability, birth or other status".

On March 22, 2006, the Associated Press reported from South Korea that a North Korean doctor who defected, Ri Kwang-chol, has claimed that babies born with physical defects are rapidly put to death and buried. A report by the United Nations special rapporteur for human rights in North Korea highlighted reports from defectors describing how disabled people are allegedly "rounded up" and sent to "special camps".

However, the charity Handicap International reports that it has been operating in North Korea since 1999, assisting the Korean Federation for the Protection of Disabled People, including supporting orthopedic centers serving thousands of disabled people. The International Committee of the Red Cross reported in 2006 that it had assisted in setting up a rehabilitation center for disabled people in Pyongyang. The International Campaign to Ban Landmines reports that North Korea "has a comprehensive system for assisting persons with disabilities; however, this system is limited by the general economic situation of the country." North Korea participated in the Paralympic Games for the first time in 2012.

Still, the special rapporteur for human rights in the DPRK, Marzuki Darusman, stated the following in his report before the United Nations Human Rights Council's 22nd session:

As early as 2003 the Commission on Human Rights expressed deep concern at the "mistreatment of and discrimination of disabled children". Since 2006 the General Assembly has consistently decried "continuing reports of violations of human rights and fundamental freedoms of persons with disabilities, especially on the use of collective camps and coercive measures that target the rights of persons with disabilities to decide freely and responsibly on the number and spacing of their children." Whereas in 2006 the Special Rapporteur noted "to date, those with disabilities are sent away from the capital city, and particularly those with mental disabilities are detained in areas or camps known as 'Ward 49' with harsh and subhuman conditions."

According to Marked for Life: Songbun, North Korea's Social Classification System, North Korea adopted a law in 2003 to promote equal access to public services for disabled people and it claimed in its second report on compliance with the International Covenant on Economic, Social and Cultural Rights that its handicapped citizens are protected. North Korea acceded to this covenant on September 14, 1981. However, its law has not been implemented, and North Korean refugees in the South testify that the handicapped are severely discriminated against unless they are wounded soldiers who say their wounds were the result of U.S. aggression during the Korean War.

=== Right to food ===
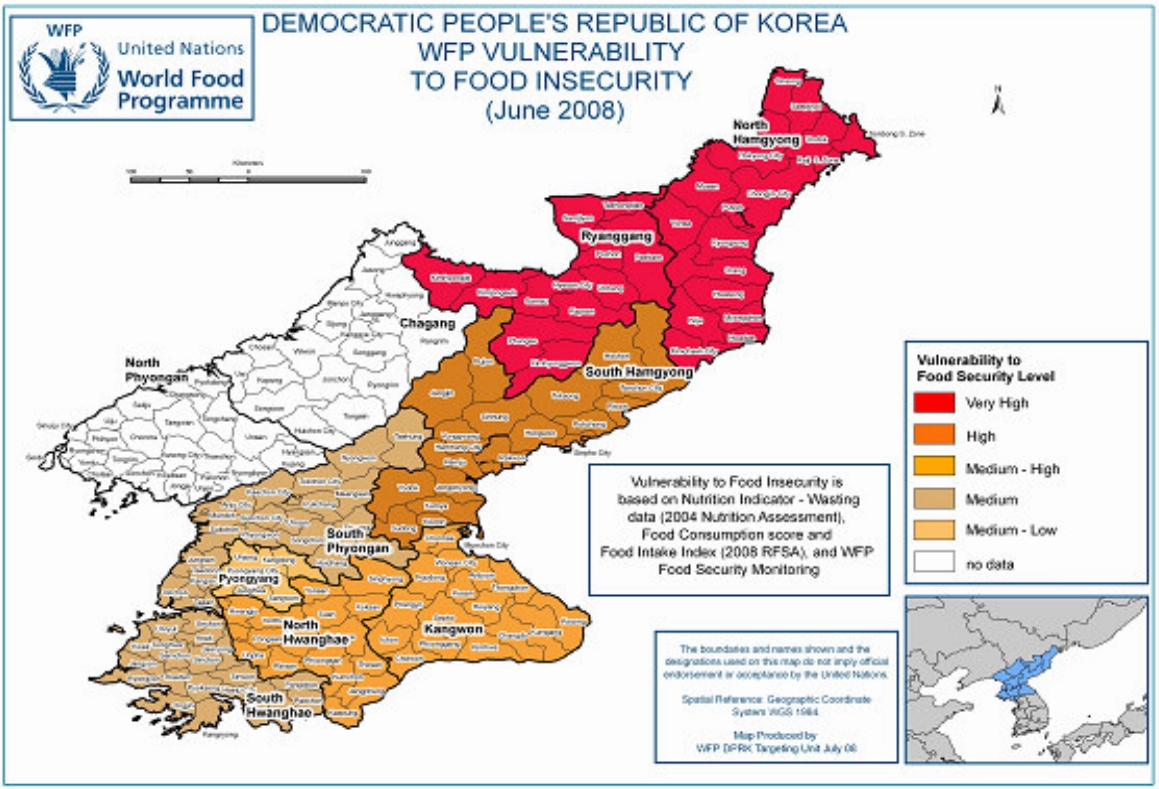
Map of DPRK Food Vulnerability and Insecurity 2008, included in the COI report

A January 2004 report by Amnesty International noted that "North Korea remains dependent on food aid to feed its people, yet government policy still prevents the swift and equitable distribution of this aid, while the population is denied the right to freedom of movement, which would enable people to go and search for food." The report found that the North Korean government had "failed in its duty to uphold and protect" the right to food and that the regime's actions "have exacerbated the effects of the famine and food crisis".

Shortly thereafter, the Committee for Human Rights in North Korea published Hunger and Human Rights: The Politics of Famine in North Korea (by Stephan Haggard and Marcus Noland, 2005), which discussed the probability that North Korean food shortages in the 1990s were a man-made (regime) phenomenon and that with plausible policy adjustments – such as maintaining food imports on commercial terms or aggressively seeking multilateral assistance – the North Korean government could have avoided famine and food shortages. Instead, in a desperate attempt to conserve resources for the Korean government, the regime blocked humanitarian aid and diverted resources to the military.

In 2016, British scholar Hazel Smith reported that health and nutrition of the population had improved greatly and was comparable to other developing countries. She disputed the view that government policies were creating a human rights crisis that was unique to North Korea.

==== Discrimination and unequal access to food ====
Economic reform abolished the old coupon system in North Korea, which had favored non-productive citizens regarding access to food. After the coupon system disappeared, an average urban family spent between 75 and 85 percent of their income on food, while state farmers were spending only a third of their income on food. These disparities show that North Korea does not have safety net mechanisms to protect the vulnerable people in society, such as housewives and the elderly.

When the food crisis began, access to food came through a public distribution system (PDS) controlled by the regime, and entitlements were partly a function of political status. As the planned economy crumbled and markets developed in response to the state's inability to fulfill its obligations under the old social compact, the character of the crisis changed. Current shortages bear a closer resemblance to food emergencies in market and transition economies, where access to food is determined by one's capacity to command resources in the marketplace. This type of emergency is no less severe, but poses different challenges to outside donors.

Food is distributed to the civilian population of North Korea through two channels. Workers on state and cooperative farms account for roughly 30 percent of the population, and most of these farmers are granted an annual allotment of grain at the time of the harvest. However, the country is highly urbanized, and the bulk of the population is fed through the PDS. The PDS distributes food as a monthly or biweekly ration. Rations, in turn, vary according to occupational status and age. For example, high-ranking party, government, and military officials are fed through separate distribution channels and receive higher rations, as do certain classes of workers.

In confronting the fundamentally non-cooperative stance of the North Korean government, the humanitarian community has pursued two basic strategies to guarantee the integrity of its assistance: the targeting of vulnerable groups, and the monitoring of food deliveries to assure that these targeted populations are being reached. At virtually every point, the North Korean government has placed roadblocks in the way of the donor community in North Korea, which succeeded to the extent that it did only through extraordinary perspicacity and flexibility. Yet, even by its own admission, this monitoring effort is a leaky sieve, and it is estimated that between 10 and 30 percent of food aid is diverted. Most concerns with diversion center on the appropriation of food by the military. Military and party elites have other sources of food; an equal if not greater problem is the diversion of food to the market or to less deserving groups.

Also, the remote regions that suffered from the most severe famine conditions were the first regions to stop receiving shipments of food supplies, and at the same time, as local industry collapsed, residents' purchasing power decreased.

Restrictions on the freedom to move caused the so-called 'hostile class' ‒ whose members were relocated to remote mountain areas ‒ to suffer from the limited access to food.

A UN human rights office report released in May 2019 highlighted the "appalling" levels of hunger that have been affecting around 10.9 million people particularly in north-eastern and rural provinces of North Korea. UN High Commissioner for Human Rights, Michelle Bachelet said, "The rights to food, health, shelter, work, freedom of movement and liberty are universal and inalienable, but in North Korea they depend primarily on the ability of individuals to bribe State officials."

==== Food shortage and malnutrition in detention ====
According to detainee testimonies, detention was most often severely overcrowded and there existed a serious lack of food. "[It] made life in Yodok very difficult. We were given corn-rice in small quantities; at times we got only salt soup with cabbage leaves. No meat was served. We were always hungry; and resorted to eating grass in spring. Three or four people died of malnutrition. When someone died, fellow prisoners delayed reporting his death to the authorities so that they could eat his allocated breakfast."

=== Women and forced prostitution ===
A group called "A Woman's Voice International" alleged that the state forcibly drafts girls as young as 14 years old to work in the so-called kippŭmjo, which includes prostitution teams. The source used is unclear as to whether only adult kippŭmjo are assigned to prostitution or whether there is prostitution of children – other kippŭmjo activities include massaging and cabaret dancing. Claims were made by representatives of "A Woman's Voice International", that they are ordered "to marry guards of Kim Jong-il or national heroes" when they are 25 years old.

=== Forced abortions ===
The People's Republic of China returns all refugees from North Korea, treated as illegal immigrants, usually imprisoning them in a short-term facility. Women who are suspected of being impregnated by Chinese men are subjected to forced abortions; babies born alive are killed. Abortions up to full term are induced by injection; live premature babies or full-term newborns are sometimes killed but more commonly simply discarded into a bucket or box and then buried. They may live several days in the disposal container.

== Criminal justice ==
The death penalty, often without judicial due process, is administered for a wide variety of political and common crimes. Attempts to escape from the country or from a prison camp within the country may result in execution on the spot. Personnel in the criminal justice system have wide discretion and are allegedly authorized to operate without regard to the formal legal rights of Koreans.

A number of members of the regime itself have disappeared or been executed after falling out of favor. The most prominent example is Jang Song-thaek, the uncle of North Korea's leader, Kim Jong Un. On December 8, 2013, Jang was publicly expelled from the ruling Workers' Party of Korea. Some of the accusations included "illicit affairs with women, obstructing the nation's economic affairs, and committing anti-party factional acts". On December 13, 2013, the state media announced that Jang had been executed.

=== Trials ===
The constitution states that courts are independent and that judicial proceedings are to take place in strict accordance to the law; however, an independent judiciary does not exist. Little information is available on formal criminal-justice procedures and practices, with outside access to the legal system limited to trials for traffic violations and other minor offenses.

The Ministry of Social Security (North Korea) (MSS) dispenses with trials in political cases and refers prisoners to the State Security Department (SSD) for punishment. According to Hidden Gulag, most inmates in prison camps arrive there without trial, without knowing the charges against them, and without having legal counsel. Witness to Transformation reported that only 13 percent of the 102 respondents who had been incarcerated in the country received a trial.

=== Public executions ===
According to the US State Department, North Korea resumed public executions in October 2007 - such executions had declined in number in the years following 2000 amidst international criticism. Prominent executed criminals include officials convicted of drug trafficking and embezzlement. Reports also tell of the executions - mostly by firing-squad - of common criminals convicted of crimes such as murder, robbery, rape, drug dealing, smuggling, piracy and vandalism. The country does not publicly release national crime statistics or reports on the levels of crimes.

In October 2007 a firing-squad executed a South Pyongan province factory-chief (convicted of making international phone calls from 13 phones he installed in his factory basement) in front of a crowd of 150,000 people in a stadium. In another instance, 15 people were publicly executed in 2008 for crossing the border into China.

In 2007 a UN General Assembly committee adopted a draft resolution, co-sponsored by more than 50 countries, expressing "very serious concern" at reports of widespread human rights violations in North Korea, including public executions. North Korea condemned the draft as inaccurate and biased, but it was still sent to the then 192-member General Assembly for a final vote.

According to Radio Free Asia, in 2011 two people were executed in front of 500 spectators for handling propaganda leaflets that had floated across the border from South Korea, apparently as part of a campaign by former North Korean leader Kim Jong Il to tighten ideological control as he groomed his youngest son Kim Jong Un as the eventual successor.

In June 2019 a Seoul-based human rights group, the Transitional Justice Working Group, claimed to have identified at least 323 sites in North Korea, where public executions took place. The group said the most common charges for execution ranged from "stealing copper and livestock" to "anti-state" activities and illegally crossing into China.

=== Prisons ===
Map of the location of political prison camps (kwanliso) and ordinary prison camps (kyohwaso) in North Korea. Map issued in 2014 by the Commission of Inquiry on Human Rights in the DPRK, under the United Nations Human Rights Council.

According to many organizations, the conditions in North Korean prisons are harsh and life-threatening. Additionally, prisoners are subjected to torture and inhumane treatment by North Korean authorities. Public and secret executions of prisoners, including children, especially in cases of escape attempts, and forced abortions and infanticides often occur. The mortality rate is very high, because many prisoners die of starvation, illnesses, work accidents, or torture.

The North Korean government flatly denies all allegations of human rights violations in prison camps, claiming that it is prohibited by criminal procedure law, but former prisoners testify that there are completely different rules in the prison camps. The North Korean government has failed to provide any information on prisoners or prison camps or even to allow access to any human rights organization.

Lee Soon-ok gave detailed testimony on her treatment in the North Korean prison system to the U.S. House of Representatives in 2002. In her statement she said, "I testify that most of the 6,000 prisoners who were there when I arrived in 1987 had quietly perished under the harsh prison conditions by the time I was released in 1992." Many other former prisoners, such as Kang Chol-hwan, have given detailed testimonies on the human rights crimes in North Korean prison camps.

According to the testimony of former camp guard Ahn Myong Chol of Camp 22, the guards are trained to treat the detainees as sub-human or slaves. He gave an account of children in one of the camps fighting over who got to eat a kernel of corn retrieved from cow dung.

The North Korean prison camp facilities can be divided into large internment camps for political prisoners (Kwan-li-so in Korean) and reeducation prison camps (Kyo-hwa-so in Korean).

On October 19, 2020, Human Rights Watch released an 88-page report "'Worth Less Than an Animal': Abuses and Due Process Violations in Pretrial Detention in North Korea", detailing the torture, abuse and unhygienic conditions of detainees in North Korea pretrial detention centers. Revealing the opaque criminal justice system, the report highlighted the "arbitrary, violent, cruel and degrading" investigation system of North Korea.

==== Internment camps for political prisoners ====
Political prison camps in North Korea

The internment camps for people accused of political offenses or denounced as politically unreliable are run by the state security department. Political prisoners were historically subjected to the family responsibility principle, which meant that the immediate family members of a convicted political criminal were also regarded as political criminals and interned. However, since 1994 there has been a near-abandonment of this family responsibility principle.

The internment camps are located in central and northeastern North Korea. They comprise many prison labor colonies in secluded mountain valleys, completely isolated from the outside world. The total number of prisoners is estimated to be 80,000 to 120,000. The Yodok and Bukchang camps are separated into two sections: one for political prisoners in lifelong detention, the other similar to re-education camps where prisoners are serving long-term sentences with the vague hope that they will eventually be released.

The prisoners are forced to perform hard and dangerous slave labor with primitive means in mining and agriculture. The food rations are very small, so the prisoners are constantly on the brink of starvation. In combination with the hard work, this leads to huge numbers of prisoners dying. An estimated 40% of prisoners die from malnutrition. Moreover, many prisoners are crippled from work accidents, frostbite, or torture. There is a rigid punishment system in the camp. Prisoners who work too slowly or do not obey an order are beaten or tortured. In cases of stealing food or attempting to escape, the prisoners are publicly executed.

Initially, there were around twelve political prison camps, but some were merged or closed (e.g. Onsong prison camp, Kwan-li-so No. 12 was closed down following an unsuccessful riot in 1987 where around 5,000 prisoners were killed). Today there are six political prison camps in North Korea (see below). Most of the camps are documented in testimonies of alleged former prisoners, and coordinates and satellite images of all are available.

English name	Official name	Size	Prisoners
Kaechon Political Prison Camp	Kwan-li-so No. 14	155 km^{2} (60 mi^{2})	15,000
Yodok Political Prison Camp	Kwan-li-so No. 15	378 km^{2} (146 mi^{2})	46,500
Hwasong Political Prison Camp	Kwan-li-so No. 16	549 km^{2} (212 mi^{2})	10,000
Bukchang Political Prison Camp	Kwan-li-so No. 18	73 km^{2} (28 mi^{2})	50,000
Hoeryong Political Prison Camp	Kwan-li-so No. 22	225 km^{2} (87 mi^{2})	50,000
Chongjin Political Prison Camp	Kwan-li-so No. 25	0,25 km^{2} (0,1 mi^{2})	3,000+

The South Korean journalist Kang Chol-hwan is a former prisoner of Yodok Political Prison Camp and has written a book, The Aquariums of Pyongyang, about his time in the camp. The International Coalition to Stop Crimes Against Humanity in North Korea (ICNK) estimates that over 10,000 people die in North Korean prison camps every year.

==== Re-education camps ====
Reeducation camps in North Korea
(10 out of around 15–20)

The re-education camps for criminals are run by the interior ministry. There is a fluent passage between common crimes and political crimes, because people who get on the bad side of influential partisans are often denounced on the basis of false accusations. They are then sent to detention centers, threatened with brutal torture and forced to make false confessions (Lee Soon-ok, for example, had to kneel down whilst being showered with water at icy temperatures with other prisoners, of whom six did not survive) and are then condemned in a brief show trial to a long-term prison sentence. In North Korea, political crimes are greatly varied, from border crossing to any disturbance of the political order, and they are rigorously punished. Due to the dire prison conditions with hunger and torture, a large percentage of prisoners do not survive their sentence term.

The re-education camps are large prison building complexes surrounded by high walls. The plight of the prisoners is quite similar to that in the political prison camps. They have to perform slave labor in prison factories. If they do not meet the work quota, they are tortured and (at least in Kaechon camp) confined for many days to special prison cells, too small to stand up or lie full-length in.

In distinction from the internment camps for political prisoners, the re-education camp prisoners are instructed ideologically after work and are forced to memorize speeches of Kim Il Sung and Kim Jong Il and to undergo self-criticism rites. Many prison inmates are guilty of common crimes penalized also in other countries, but often they were committed out of economic necessity, e.g. illegal border crossing, stealing food or illegal trading.

There are around 15–20 reeducation camps in North Korea.

Two camps are documented with coordinates, satellite images and testimonies of former prisoners.

Re-education camp	Official name	Size	Prisoners
Kaechon Reeducation Camp	Kyo-hwa-so No. 1	300 m × 300 m (980 ft × 980 ft)	6,000
Chongori Reeducation Camp	Kyo-hwa-so No. 12	150 m × 350 m (490 ft × 1,150 ft)	2,000

Other camps are documented with short testimonies of people who claim to be former prisoners.

- Kyo-hwa-so No. 3 Sinuiju (c. 2,500 prisoners) in North Pyongan
- Kyo-hwa-so No. 4 Kangdong (c. 7,000 prisoners) in South Pyongan
- Kyo-hwa-so No. 8 Yongdam (c. 3,000 prisoners) in Kangwon
- Kyo-hwa-so No. 11 Chungsan (c. 3,300 prisoners) in South Pyongan
- Kyo-hwa-so No. 15 Hamhung (c. 500 prisoners) in South Hamgyong
- Kyo-hwa-so No. 22 Oro (c. 1,000 prisoners) in South Hamgyong
- Kyo-hwa-so No. 77 Danchon (c. 6,000 prisoners) in South Hamgyong
- Kyo-hwa-so Hoeryong (c. 1,500 prisoners) in North Hamgyong

Further camps are mentioned as being in Taehŭng and Sŭnghori (already closed).

The South Korean human rights activist Lee Soon-ok has written a book (Eyes of the Tailless Animals: Prison Memoirs of a North Korean Woman) about her time in a camp and testified before the US Senate.

In October 2014, North Korea admitted for the first time that it had labor camps. Choe Myong Nam, a North Korean foreign ministry spokesperson said "Both in law and practice, we do have reform through labor detention camps – no, detention centers – where people are improved through their mentality and look on their wrongdoings".

== International abductions ==
In the decades after the Korean War, there were reports that North Korea had abducted many foreign nationals, mainly South Korean and Japanese people. There are many testimonies that nine European citizens and several U.S. citizens have also been abducted to North Korea. For years, these were dismissed as conspiracy theories even by many of the regime's critics; however, in September 2002, Kim Jong-Il partially acknowledged to Japanese Prime Minister Junichiro Koizumi the involvement of North Korean "special institutions" in the kidnapping of Japanese citizens during a period of six years from 1977 to 1983. Kim Jong Il officially admitted to abducting 13 Japanese citizens out of 17 Japanese the Japanese government accused North Korea of abducting. He stated that those responsible had been punished.

Five surviving victims were allowed to visit Japan and decided not to return to North Korea. For eight more Japanese abductees, officials claimed deaths caused by accidents or illnesses; Japan says this leaves two still unaccounted for, and says that what North Korea claimed were the ashes of Megumi Yokota were not hers.

Regardless of the admission to Prime Minister Koizumi, the North Korean government continues to deny the kidnappings of other foreign nationals and refuses any cooperation to investigate further cases of suspected abductions. In 2017, a former Japanese abductee Hasuike publicly stated that "Japan's prime minister needs to visit North Korea again", urging Prime Minister Shinzō Abe to visit North Korea to discuss the continuing abduction issues between North Korea and Japan by taking the advantage of the Pyongyang Declaration.

Officials of the South Korean government claim that 486 South Koreans, mostly fishermen, are believed to have been abducted since the end of the Korean War. Advocates and family members have accused the government of doing little or nothing to gain their freedom. South Korea officially recognized 480 South Korean abductees to be held in North Korea. Even after the Korean War, North Korea is accused of abducting South Koreans such as Kim Dong-shik, who was abducted on January 16, 2000 and Jin Gyeong-suk, a North Korean defector to South Korea who was abducted on August 8, 2004.

In November 2013, a civic group, the Korean War Abductees Family Association (KWAFA), consisting of family members of South Koreans abducted to North Korea during the Korean War (1950–53), said it will take North Korean leader Kim Jong Un to the International Criminal Court (ICC) for unlawful detention of the abductees and failure to address related abuses.

Examples of non-Korean or non-Japanese people abducted by North Korea include Doina Bumbea, from Romania, and Anocha Panjoy, from Thailand, as well as several others.

== International reaction ==
Many countries and multilateral organizations have criticized North Korea for its alleged human rights abuses. Since 2005, the United Nations General Assembly has adopted a resolution every year to condemn the human rights situation in North Korea.

Multiple countries have been critical of the allegations made against North Korea. China's delegation to the United Nations said that North Korea has "made considerable progress in protecting human rights. Sudan's government said that instead of criticizing the country, there should be support by the international community for North Korea's efforts to protect human rights." Venezuela's delegation to the United Nations asserted that the allegations made by UN observers against North Korea are "based on flawed criteria and are not credible." Cuba's delegation to the United Nations said that the body's claims made against North Korea are "politically motivated and seek to impose isolation and pressure on the country, in violation of the Human Rights Council's stated principles."

The U.S. and Japan have passed laws and created envoys in order to bring this issue to public attention. The U.S. initially passed the North Korean Human Rights Act of 2004 in October of that year, and reauthorized the law in 2008. It created an office at the State Department focused on North Korean human rights, run originally by Special Envoy Jay Lefkowitz.

The NGO Freedom House has ranked North Korea at the very bottom of its "Freedom in the World" ratings since the survey was first launched in 1973. In Freedom House's 2013 survey, North Korea was one of nine countries that earned a 7 (its lowest rating) for both political rights and civil liberties. Its current report on North Korea categorizes it as "Not Free", and states that there are virtually no organizations independent of state control. North Korea has charged that those who make allegations about human rights in the country are interfering with the country's internal affairs and trying to force down their values.

Other international NGOs have been established with the purpose of relieving the human rights abuses faced by North Koreans. The North Korea Strategy Center works to provide people living in North Korea with access to videos, music, and other external media that promotes human rights and democracy. An organization called Liberty in North Korea collects charitable donations in order to perform rescue missions for defectors attempting to escape North Korea through China. Still other organizations focus on assisting defectors after they arrive in Southeast Asia, South Korea, the United States, or other destinations. Saejowi, a Seoul-based NGO, aims to provide medical support to defectors in South Korea, because they are often unable to understand the treatment options available to them.

With the exception of the international abductions issue regarding Japanese, Americans, and South Koreans, which it says has been "fully resolved", North Korea strongly rejects all reports of human rights violations and accuses the defectors of "promoting only an anti-North agenda."

On September 9, 2020, the Office of the United Nations High Commissioner for Human Rights in Seoul published a report stating that voices of citizens of the Democratic People's Republic of Korea, including women, are being curbed. It urged the United States and South Korea to raise concerns about North Korean human rights abuses, whenever the negotiations with North Korea resumes. In July 2024, North Korea's increasing alliance with Russia underscores the importance for South Korea, as a U.N. Security Council member, to prioritize human rights in talks about North Korea's security threats. Given the Security Council's current impasse, South Korea should advocate in the U.N. General Assembly to connect North Korea's human rights violations with its weapons program, building on the April 2024 resolution that heightened scrutiny of North Korea's human rights record.

== Number of victims ==
Estimates based on the North Korean census suggest that 240,000 to 420,000 people died as a result of the North Korean famine and that excess mortality during the whole period 1993 to 2008 was between 600,000 and 850,000. The famine has been described as the result of the economic policies of the North Korean government or as deliberate "terror-starvation".

According to R.J. Rummel, forced labor, executions, and concentration camps were responsible for over one million deaths in North Korea from 1948 to 1987; others have estimated 400,000 deaths in concentration camps alone. Co-author of The Black Book of Communism Pierre Rigoulot estimates 100,000 executions, 1.5 million deaths in concentration camps and 500,000 deaths from famine, reaching a total of 2.1 million victims (not counting 1.3 million Korean soldiers and civilians killed on both sides during the Korean War). During the Korean War the DPRK "liquidated" 29,000 civilians in the first 3 months of occupying South Korea.

== Media and organizations ==
- Chosun Journal, an independent non-profit website that links communities for human rights in North Korea.
- Hanvoice, a Canada-based human rights organization that assists North Korean refugees.
- North Korea Uncovered, a comprehensive set of maps of North Korea showing thousands of buildings, monuments, missile-storage facilities, mass graves, secret labor camps, palaces, restaurants, tourist sites, and main roads.
- Seoul Train, a 2004 documentary film that deals with North Korean defectors fleeing through or to China.
- Escape from Camp 14, a book about a North Korean born child and his life under the camp conditions.
- In Order to Live, a memoir published in 2015 that talks about a North Korean girl's journey to freedom. Written by Yeonmi Park, a North Korean defector known for her speech at One Young World 2014 Summit in Dublin, Ireland, the memoir gives a detailed description of the life in North Korea and the process of defection.
- Children of the Secret State, a documentary film that focuses on showing the pitiful lives of North Korean orphans. The film consists of much visual proof of North Korea's humanitarian crisis such as prison camp, famine and malnutrition. The film was released in 2001 and movie critiques such as Allison Gorman noted that the film "shows ... the gross abuse of power and money to favor the few".

== See also ==
- List of fact-finding reports on human rights in North Korea
- Human experimentation in North Korea
- Korean War POWs detained in North Korea
- Kotjebi, a Korean term denoting North Korean homeless children and elderly.
- North Korea's illicit activities
- Human trafficking in North Korea
- History of North Korea
- Politics of North Korea
- Propaganda in North Korea
- List of foreign nationals detained in North Korea
- Criticism of communist party rule
- Mass killings under communist regimes
