= North Korea Uncovered =

Comprehensive mapping of North Korea

- Keywords: North Korea, Geography, Politics, Government
- Project type: Academic
- Objective: Comprehensive multi-dimensional Google Earth mapping of the infrastructure of North Korea
- Participants: Curtis Melvin, et al.
- Duration: ? 2007 – June 2009
- Website: www.nkeconwatch.com/north-korea-uncovered-google-earth/

North Korea Uncovered is a comprehensive set of mappings of North Korea. It includes in-depth coverage of thousands of buildings, monuments, missile-storage facilities, mass graves, secret labor camps, palaces, restaurants, tourist sites, and main roads of the country, and even includes the entrance to the country's subterranean nuclear test base, the Yongbyon Nuclear Scientific Research Center.

The mapping was the result of a two-year effort by doctoral student Curtis Melvin and other volunteers, who pored over hundreds of news reports, images, accounts, books, and maps in order to identify the geographic and political sites. The result has been called one of the most detailed maps of North Korea available to the public in 2009. It is available as a small KMZ file, viewable with Google Earth. Between April 2007 and April 2012, the data file was downloaded more than 270,000 times.

== See also ==
- North Korean leader's residences
- Sinuiju North Korean Leader's Residence
