= Kaechon prison camp =

North Korean concentration camp

Coordinates: 39°42′30″N 125°55′24″E

- Kyo-hwa-so No. 1 Kaechon
- Chosŏn'gŭl: 개천 제1호교화소
- Hancha: 价川第一號敎化所
- Revised Romanization: Gaecheon Je1ho Gyohwaso
- McCune–Reischauer: Kaechŏn Che1ho Kyohwaso

- Kaechon Political Prisoner Camp
- Hangul: 개천 정치범 수용소
- Hanja: 价川政治犯收容所
- Revised Romanization: Gaecheon Jeongchibeom Suyongso
- McCune–Reischauer: Kaechŏn Chŏngch'ibŏm Suyongso

Kyo-hwa-so (Reeducation camp) No. 1 Kaechon (Chosŏn'gŭl: 개천 제1호교화소; also spelled Kaech'ŏn or Gaecheon) is a re-education prison in North Korea with many political prisoners. It is not to be confused with the Kaechon internment camp (Kwan-li-so No. 14), which is located 20 km (12 mi) to the south-east and is a more severe, kwalliso, camp. Both are often known outside North Korea as Kaechon concentration camp (Hangul: 개천 정치범 수용소; literally ‘Kaechon Political Prisoner Camp').

== Location ==
Location of Kaechon camp in North Korea

The camp is located in Kae'chŏn county, South Pyongan Province in North Korea. It is situated on the outskirts of Kaechon city, around 2.5 km (1.6 mi) east of the city center, behind a little hill.

== Description ==
Kaechon concentration camp is a large prison compound, around 300 m (1000 feet) long and 300 m (1000 feet) wide, surrounded by a 4 m (13 feet) high wall with barbed wire on top. The prisoners, around 4000 men and 2000 women (in 1992), are political prisoners mixed with common criminals. Theoretically prisoners should be released after reeducation through labor and serving their sentence. But as the prison sentences are very long and the conditions are extremely harsh, many do not survive their prison sentences. Ji Hae-nam estimates that during her sentence of two years around 20% of the prisoners died.

== Purpose ==
The main purpose of Kaechon camp is to punish people for less-serious crimes, whereas political crimes (e. g. criticism of the government) are considered a severe offense. But the prisoners are also used as slave workers, who have to fulfill high production quotas in very difficult conditions. For this purpose there is a shoe making factory, a leather and rubber factory, a clothing factory and other factories in the camp.

== Human rights situation ==
The human rights situation in the camp is described in detail by Lee Soon-ok in her testimony to the United States Senate Committee on the Judiciary. She explains how the prisoners have no rights and how they are treated at the mercy of the guards.

=== Forced labour ===
The prisoners are forced to work around 18 hours per day at the camp's factories. If someone does not work quickly enough, they are beaten. Sometimes prisoners sleep at their workplaces to fulfill the production quota. All this involves frequent work accidents and many prisoners are crippled from the work or from torture.

=== Health and sanitation ===
Prisoners are forced to sleep in a room with 80 to 90 people in 30 square metre (322 square feet) flea-infested rooms. Prisoners are only occasionally allowed to use the toilet (one for about 300 people) and may only take a shower after several months. Diseases like paratyphus are common, resulting from the bad nutrition.

=== Malnutrition ===
Food rations are 100 grams of broken corn three times a day and a salt soup. In case of rule violations food rations are reduced. Lee Soon-ok reported that prisoners even killed rats and ate them raw in order to survive.

=== Torture ===
There are 78 punishment cells in the camp, each 60 cm (24 inches) wide and 110 cm (43 inches) high, where prisoners are locked up for several days. Afterwards many of them are unable to walk and some even die. Prisoners are often beaten, kicked or whipped. Lee Soon-ok was tortured being forced to drink a large quantity of water until she fainted (water torture) and almost died. During her sentence she witnessed many types of torture.

=== Homicides and Infanticides ===
Pregnant women are forced to have abortions by injections. Lee Soon-ok witnessed babies born alive being murdered directly after birth.

=== Executions ===
As with all the prison camps, public executions are commonplace and usually done in front of all of the prisoners.

== Prisoners (witnesses) ==
- Lee Soon-ok (1987–1992 in Kaechon) was imprisoned on alleged embezzlement of state property, when she refused to put material on the side for her superior. She was sentenced to 13 years in a prison camp, but released earlier under a surprise amnesty.
- Ji Hae-nam (1993–1995 in Kaechon) was imprisoned on disruption of the socialist order, as she sang a South Korean pop song and was denounced by a neighbor. She was sentenced to 3 years in a prison camp, but released after 2 years and 2 months.

== See also ==
- Human rights in North Korea
- Prisons in North Korea
- Yodok concentration camp
- Kaechon internment camp
- Lee Soon Ok
- Eyes of the Tailless Animals: Prison Memoirs of a North Korean Woman

== Bibliography ==
- Lee, Soon Ok. Eyes of the Tailless Animals: Prison Memoirs of a North Korean Woman. Living Sacrifice Book Co, 1999, ISBN 978-0-88264-335-9
