= Political repression in North Korea =

People in North Korea suffer political repression throughout their daily lives, including on their speech, travel, employment, and religion. The Kim dynasty has ruled North Korea for three generations and exercises absolute centralised power in the service of the political ideologies of Juche and Songun. Juche is criticised by many scholars and perceived as a totalitarian ideology. Songun refers to the "military-first policy", according to which the Korean People's Army has the highest political, economic, and resource-allocation priority, taking precedence over all other parts of society.

North Korea, as a one-party state, requires every citizen to memorise the Ten Principles for the Establishment of a Monolithic Ideological System, to ensure absolute loyalty and obedience towards the Kim family. Punishments include detention, removal to a prison camp, and execution, in private or public, if people's behaviours, actions, and consumption are not approved by the state or show disrespect to the Kim family.

== Juche ideology ==
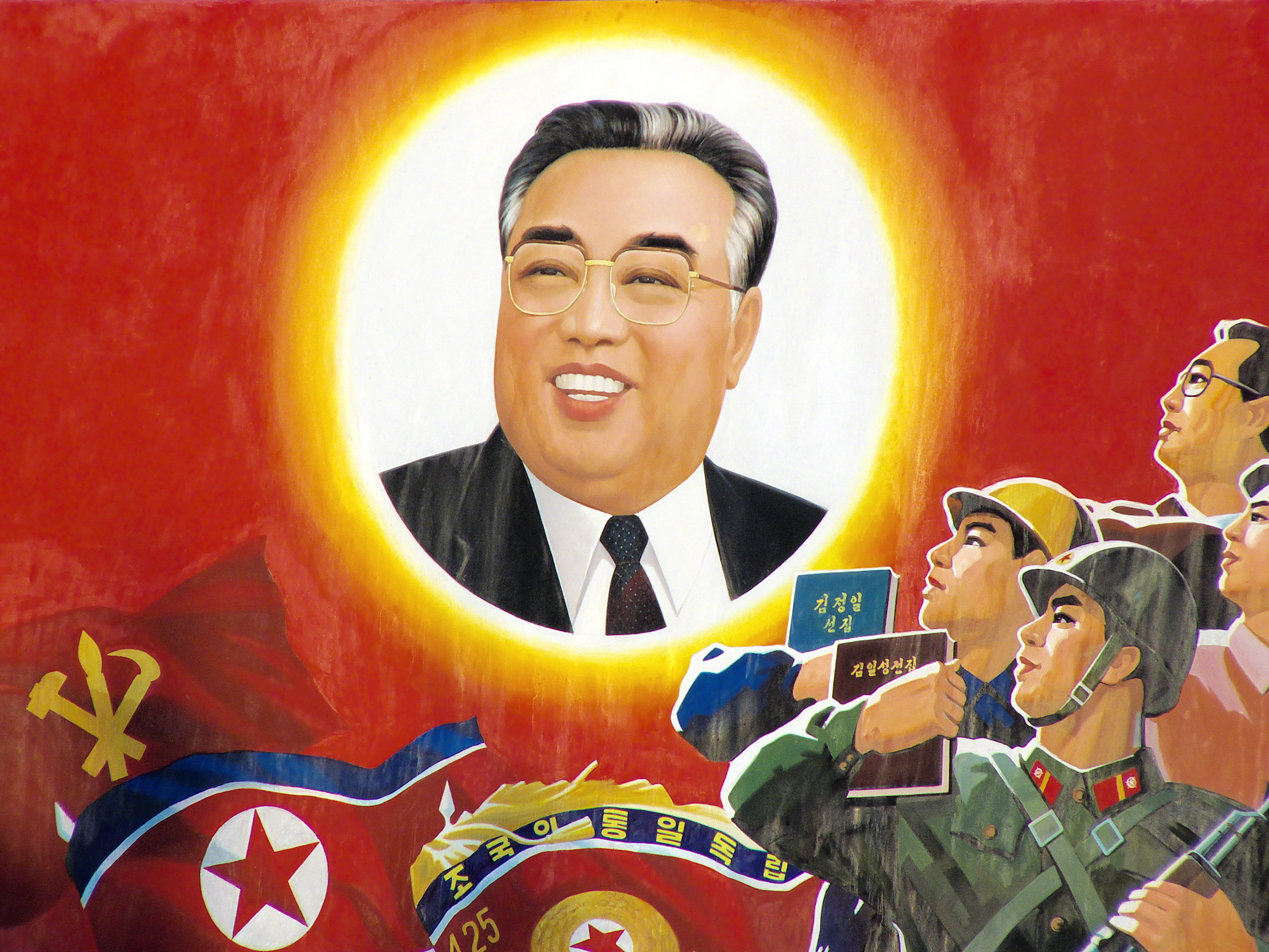
Kim Il Sung developed Juche.

Juche ideology, a variant of Marxism-Leninism, was developed by Kim Il Sung. While initially similar to Marxism-Leninism, the ideology emphasises "Political independence, Economic self-sustenance, and Self-reliance" as stated in a speech delivered by Kim Il Sung on the 14th of April 1965. Juche focuses on leadership of the masses, and, according to Juche, the only man who can lead the masses to have success is Kim Il Sung. This consolidated his supreme position over the Workers' Party and North Korea.

The theory describes the great leader as an "absolutist and supreme leader". The great leader has the highest wisdom and is also the only human being to legitimately represent to the working class. The great leader can realise class conflicts, lead people to revolutionary changes, and overcome difficult tasks. In addition, the great leader is a flawless human being who was never wrong and never commits mistakes and always has the power to rule the masses. Only the introduction of a unitary ideology system can make the great leader theory function, in North Korea the Ten Principles for a Monolithic Ideological System.

== Political parties and elections ==
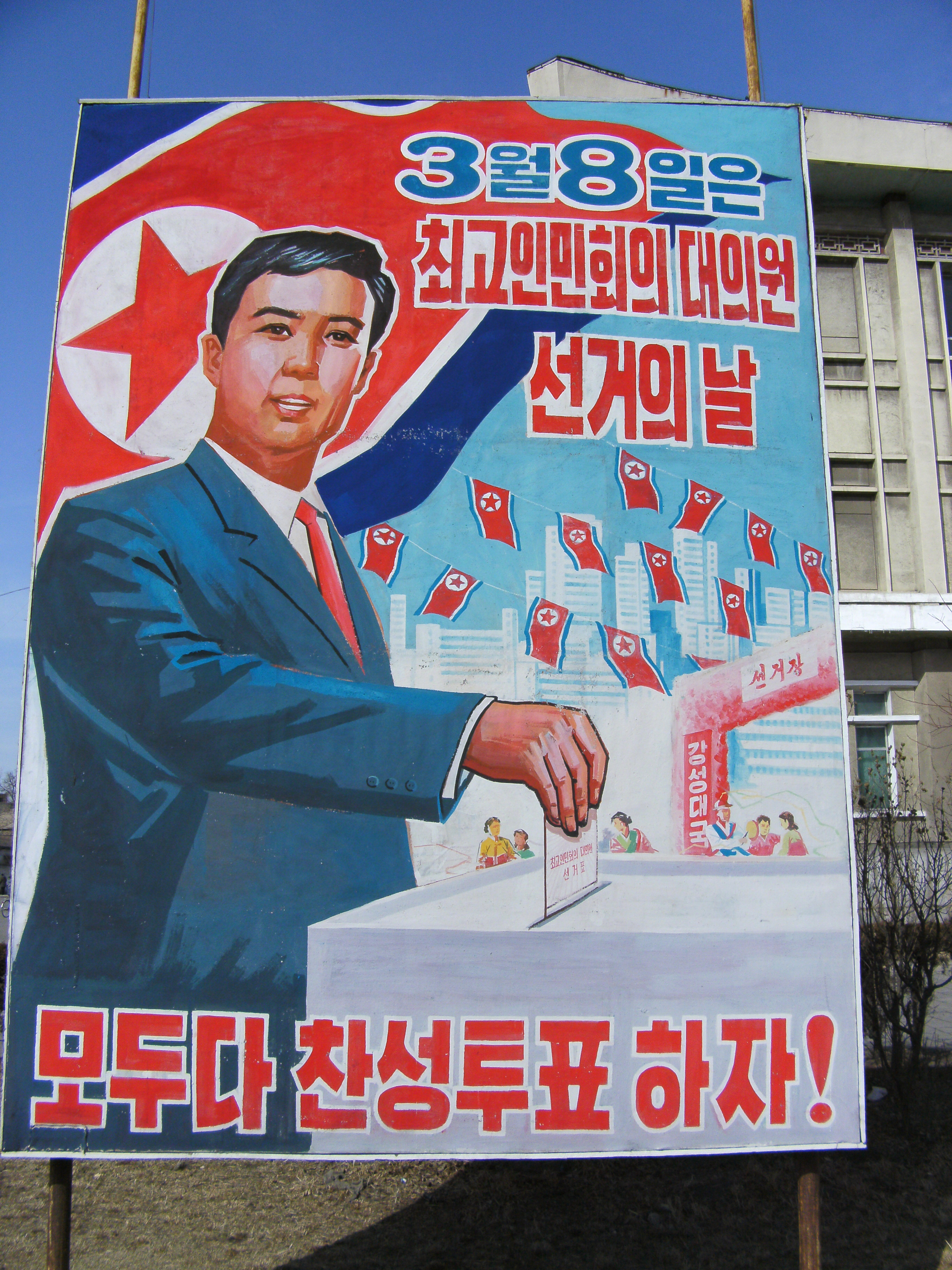
Official advertising for an Supreme People's Assembly election

The Supreme People's Assembly is the sole legislature in North Korea and holds the quinquennial elections to select the leading party and the top leader. There are three different parties, the Workers' Party of Korea, Korean Social Democratic Party and Chondoist Chongu Party, and a few deputies from other organisations. The three parties are all nominated by the Democratic Front for the Reunification of the Fatherland and the Workers' party is always expected to win. All citizens aged 17 and above have the mandatory obligation to vote. Joining and supporting groups and expressing happiness to be able to vote, thanks to the great leadership of the nation, are expected after leaving the polling station. The elections are criticised as a show, because the turnout rate is invariably around 100%. Voting against the candidate carries the risk of secret police surveillance of the voter on suspicion of disloyalty. Those who vote against the leadership are likely to lose their houses, jobs, or be declared insane as punishment. The Workers' Party hold the majority of votes in every election and the Supreme People's Assembly determines the Workers' Party dominant political power over North Korea.

== Secret police ==
The secret police agency is an autonomous and separate agency attached to the State Security Department (Thought Police) in North Korea. According to the testimony of former secret police instructor ,Kong Thak-ho, the selection process of the secret police is based on loyalty to the ruling party and Kim family, with specific skills regarding police work being the least important part. Potential secret police candidates are investigated through six generations of their family, with their employment dependent on if a relative held a position of importance. One of the main duties of the secret police is to stifle the political opposition who are disillusioned with the regime and thereby defying the Kim family. The secret police agency is authorised to go through a special tribunal and report directly to Kim Jong Un. High ranking secret police are also tasked with censoring all North Korean publications and granting state approval of publications. Another duty of the secret police is to run concentration camps in North Korea. The guards are trained to treat prisoners with contempt and may receive punishment for showing any form of sympathy to inmates.

== Religion ==
North Korea officially claims itself as atheistic. Religion in North Korea is hard to be observed by outsiders because of its extreme isolation from the world. Estimates carried out by Religious Intelligence UK, show the majority of North Koreans to not be religious. Korean shamanism and Chondoism are the main religions, Buddhism and Christianity are in the minority.

The table below illustrates the estimation of populations of religions in North Korea in the 2000s.

	Population size	Percentage
Irreligious	15,356,354	64.3
Korean shamanism	3,846,000	16
Chondoism	3,245,000	13.5
Christianity	406,000	1.7
Buddhism	1,082,888	4.5

The Chondoist Chongu Party (Party of the Young Friends of the Heavenly Way) is the political embodiment of Chondoism, which is approved as the 'national religion' by the state. Officials compliment the unique characteristics of Chondoism, comparing them with the features of communism as minjung (the mass) and revolutionary anti-imperialism. The development of Buddhist tradition in North Korea differs from that in South Korea since the division of Korea. Buddhist activities are entirely funded and authorised by the official Korea Buddhist Federation. Religious activities in North Korea are inactive, as the existing temples built in the past are protected as cultural heritage.

Previously, Christianity was widespread within the northern part of the Korean peninsula, to the point that Pyongyang was sometimes described as the "Jerusalem of the East." However, after the founding of the Democratic People's Republic of Korea, Kim Il Sung criticised and discouraged Christianity. South Korea became the new destination for those who were afraid of being persecuted and then escaped from the North.

Referring to actions in the Korean War and testimonies of defectors, some scholars argue that religion is entirely eliminated by the state, because imperialists may take advantage of it to destabilise the regime and slow down the construction of communism. For the sake of survival, the new reality compels people to abandon their former religions. In this perspective, both Buddhism and Christianity have been deracinated and the reappearance of Korea Buddhist Federation and Korean Christian Federation after 1970 has no practical implications for the existence of religions. On the other hand, based on the evidence gathered, religions, including communities of Buddhism and Christianity, still survived and reappeared. A possible reason is that the adherents also firmly believed in the value of communism in terms of Marxism–Leninism, and Kimilsungism (Juche), and showed the highest respect to the leadership.

== Food allocation ==
Since the 1990s, North Korea has not provided sufficient food for its citizens and it heavily relies on international food aid. Due to economic sanctions, North Korea is unable to import food and develop its agricultural technology. Compounding the mismanagement of resources and environment, the food yield is insufficient to feed the population. It is illegal for citizens to find food due to the limitation of movement. Those effects give rise to mass famine and starvation.

It is questioned by Stephan Haggard and Marcus Noland whether the great food shortages in the 1990s could have been avoided, but the regime did not prioritize people's safety and arbitrarily kept allocating resources to the army. Policy adjustments could have overcome great food shortages. The state refused to accept aid from international humanitarian organisations and passively conducted foreign relations.

== Media ==
Media is under the strictest control by the state and functions as political propaganda. North Korea is ranked last out of 180 countries on the World Press Freedom Index 2018. All newspapers and broadcasters are owned by the government and their main focus is to consolidate national unity and to ensure the absolute loyalty towards Kim Jong Un. The Korean Central News Agency is the main news provider and the capital city Pyongyang is home to all publishing houses of 12 major newspapers, including Rodong Sinmun, and 20 periodicals. Moreover, every native journalist is a member of the Workers' Party and native journalists regard foreign journalists as 'liars' aiming to destabilise the government.

Using phones, including mobile phones, for communication and file transmission is only allowed in the national intranet, which is entirely controlled and monitored by the government. Ordinary North Koreans cannot access foreign media legally and receiving information from foreign outlets in any form can be punished with deportation to a concentration camp.

== Official loyalty ranking of citizens ==
The government assesses citizens on the basis of songbun and classifies them into roughly 50 sub-classifications under three main categories, according to testimony by refugees and obtained documents from North Korea. Personal behaviour, family background and their relatives' background, concerning their political stance and socioeconomic status, are key elements of assessing one's loyalty to the government and the great leader. Therefore, responsibility, educational and employment opportunity, and even adequate food will be allocated to an individual only if the individual is trustworthy, as determined by their songbun. A good songbun is a fundamental qualification for any individual willing to join the Workers' Party.

According to the government, all citizens are treated equally and family background is never a basis for any discrimination.

== Internment camp ==
Internment camps in North Korea

The State Security Department is in charge of the internment camps used to imprison political offenders and people who are suspected of political unreliability. Until the near-abandonment of the principle in 1994, innocent people could be treated as political criminals and interned, if a convicted political criminal is their immediate family member. Central and northeastern North Korea become the main regions for internment camps, which contain about 80,000 to 120,000 political prisoners overall. In order to ensure extreme isolation from the outside world, the camps are situated in secluded mountain valleys. Many people die in the camps, due to torture, starvation, an unsanitary environment, and working accidents.

With the evidence given by the former prisoners and satellite images, the table below shows the six remaining internment camps in North Korea.

Location	Population	Size
Bukchang	50,000	73 km^{2}
Hoeryong	50,000	225 km^{2}
Yodok	46,500	378 km^{2}
Kaechon	15,000	155 km^{2}
Hwasong	10,000	549 km^{2}
Chongjin	3,000	0,25 km^{2}

Yodok and Bukchang internment camps have different functions. For the former, the camp is designed to imprison criminals for life imprisonment. The latter is used to imprison people with lengthy jail terms and little hope of release.

News reports about Yodok state that landlords, purged party officials and the religiously active were initially sent to a political prison and sentenced to hard labor. Once citizens are suspected of disrespect or disloyalty to the leadership, and considered guilty of political or ideological crimes, they are sent to the prisons as well. There are about 200,000 inmates in the network of political prisons and a former inmate noted that inmates are often abused, starved, and forced to watch the public execution of their fellow inmates.
