= Shin Dong-hyuk =

North Korean defector (born 1980/1982)

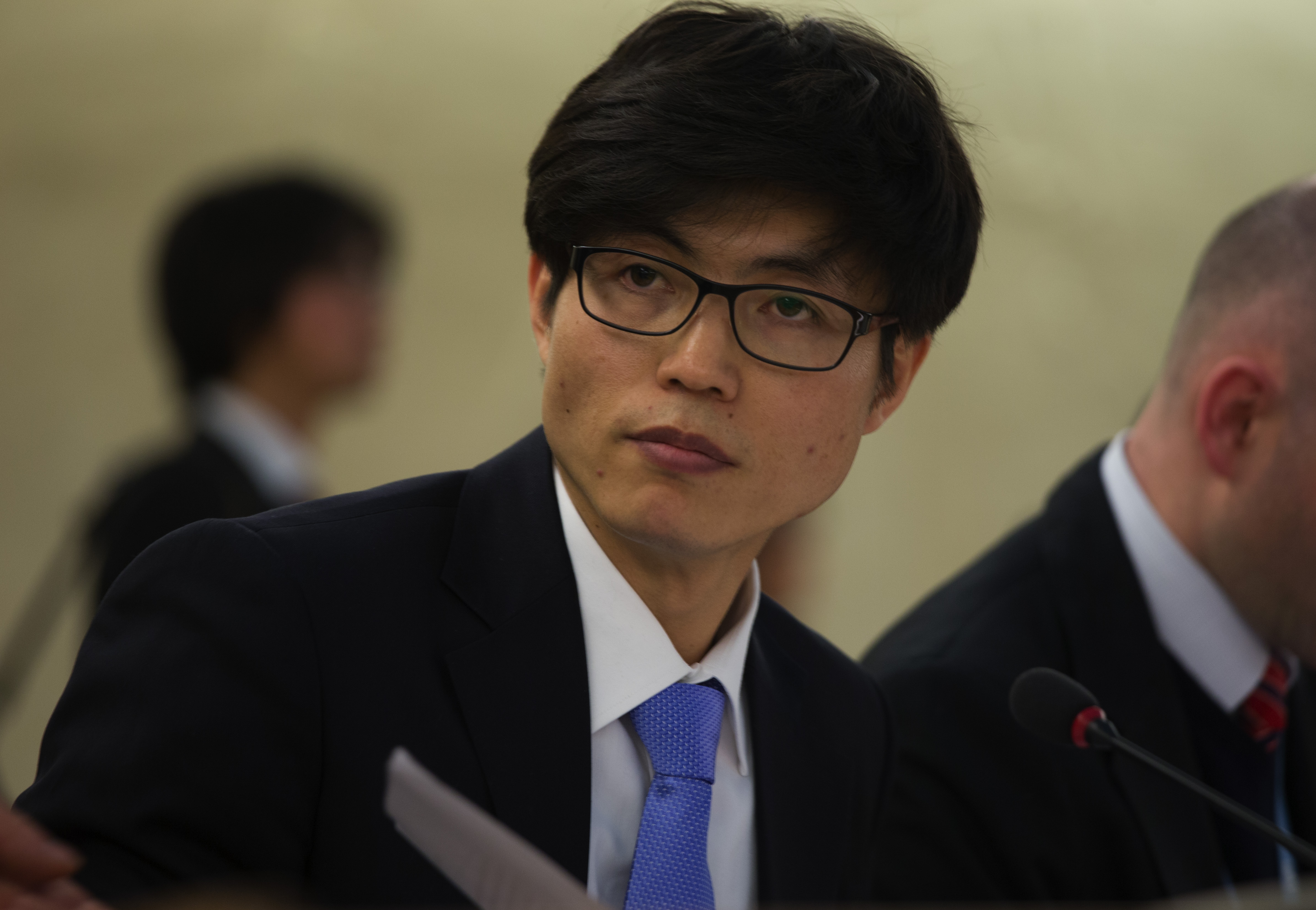
- Shin in 201 (2014)
- Born: Shin In Geun; 19 November 1982 (age 43) or 19 November 1980 (age 45); Kaechon internment camp, Kaechon or Pukchang, North Korea
- Occupations: Human rights campaigner, Witness to abuse of Human rights in North Korea

Korean name
- Hangul: 신동혁
- Hanja: 申東赫
- RR: Sin Donghyeok
- MR: Sin Tonghyŏk

Former name
- Hangul: 신인근
- RR: Sin Ingeun
- MR: Sin In'gŭn

Shin Dong-hyuk (born Shin In Geun, 19 November 1982 or 1980) is a North Korean-born human rights activist. He claims to be the only prisoner to have successfully escaped from a "total-control zone" grade internment camp in North Korea. His biography, Escape from Camp 14: One Man's Remarkable Odyssey from North Korea to Freedom in the West, was written with the assistance of former Washington Post journalist Blaine Harden.

Shin has given talks to audiences around the world about his life in North Korea's Camp 14 to raise awareness of the situation in North Korean internment and concentration camps and North Korea. Shin has been described as the world's "single strongest voice" on the atrocities inside North Korean camps by a member of the United Nations' first commission of inquiry into human rights abuses of North Korea. However, many experts on North Korean politics and fellow defectors, have expressed scepticism for Shin's stories of life in North Korea.

In January 2015, he recanted many aspects of his story of life in North Korea after a video was released showing Shin's father alive, despite Shin having previously claimed he was dead. He also admitted that he lied about being in Camp 14 for his whole life until he escaped in his early 20s, saying that he was actually transferred to a different prison when he was aged 6.

== Biography ==
The following is Shin's biography as told by him prior to 2015 which he later partially recanted.

=== Early life ===
Shin Dong-hyuk was born Shin In Geun at the Kaechon internment camp, commonly known as Camp 14. He was born to two prisoners who were allowed to marry as a reward for good work, although "neither bride nor groom had much say in deciding whom they would marry." Shin's father, Shin Gyung Sub, told Shin that the guards gave him his mother, Jang Hye-gyung, as payment for his skill in operating a metal lathe in the camp's machine shop. Shin lived with his mother until he was 12. He rarely saw his father who lived elsewhere in the camp and was allowed to visit a few times a year. According to Shin, he saw his mother as a competitor for their insufficient food rations, and consequently had no bonds of affection with his parents or his brother, Shin He Geun. The North Korean government officials and camp guards told him he was imprisoned because his parents had committed crimes against the state, and that he had to work hard and always obey the guards; otherwise he would be punished or executed.

Shin went to primary and secondary school while in the camp. The secondary school was "little more than slave quarters from which he was sent out as a rock picker, weed puller and dam laborer." At one point, a young girl was beaten to death by the teacher for hoarding a few kernels of corn. His education did not include propaganda or even basic information about North Korea. The personality cult around Kim Il Sung and Kim Jong Il was also absent; for example there were no portraits of the Kim leaders on display. The camp was near a hydroelectric dam and mines in which the prisoners were forced to labour. In one of Shin's prison cells, where he was held during an interrogation, he said he had electricity and running water. Shin's mother lived in a house with multiple rooms in a "model village" in the camp, given to women who had children.

Shin experienced considerable violence in the camp, and witnessed dozens of executions every year. Part of Shin's right middle finger was cut off by his supervisor as punishment for accidentally breaking a sewing machine. He witnessed adult prisoners and children beaten every day, and many prisoners dying of starvation, illness, torture and work accidents. He learned to survive by any means, including eating rats, frogs, and insects, and reporting fellow inmates for rewards.

=== Mother and brother plan to escape ===
When Shin was 13 years old, he overheard his mother and brother planning an escape attempt. Shin had just finished eating watery corn porridge, and was trying to sleep until he overheard that He Geun, his brother, had run from the cement factory. Shin's mother Jang was preparing rice, a symbol of wealth in North Korea, for the escape from Camp 14. Shin was jealous his brother was getting rice. Shin's teacher was already in the gated Bowiwon village, so Shin told the night guard of his school with another boy, as informing was something he was taught to do from an early age, and he hoped to be rewarded. However, the school night guard took full credit for discovering the plan, and rather than being rewarded, Shin was arrested and guards tortured him for four days to extract more information, believing him to be part of the plan to escape.

According to Shin, the guards lit a charcoal fire under his back and forced a hook into his skin so that he could not struggle which caused many large scars still visible on his body. On 29 November 1996, after approximately seven months spent in a tiny concrete prison cell, he was released and joined by his father, who had also been imprisoned. They were driven back to the main camp wearing blindfolds and their hands tied behind their backs. Camp officials then forced Shin and his father to watch the public executions of Shin's mother and brother; he then understood he had been responsible for the executions. Shin’s mother was executed by hanging while Shin’s brother was executed by firing squad.

Shin stated that at the time of the executions of his brother and mother, in his teenaged mind he felt they "deserved" their fates for both breaking prison rules and, conversely, not including him in the escape plan. Shin has since expressed remorse over his actions, saying in an interview with Anderson Cooper for the CBS television show 60 Minutes, "My mother and brother, if I could meet them through a time machine, I would like to go back and apologize".

In interviews to South Korea's National Intelligence Service and others, and in his Korean language memoir, Shin had said that he had no prior knowledge of the escape. It was only when talking to Harden that he revised his story and said that he had informed on his mother and brother.

=== Escape with Park ===
While working at a textile factory, Shin became friends with a 40-year-old political prisoner from Pyongyang (surnamed Park), who was educated and had traveled outside North Korea. Park had been to East Germany and China. Park said that he shook Kim Jong Il's hand. Park told him about the outside world, such as stories about food that Shin had not experienced before. According to Shin, nearly every meal he had eaten up to that point had been a soupy gruel of cabbage, corn, and salt, with occasional wild-caught rats and insects. He was excited by the idea of being able to eat as much food as he wanted to, which Shin considered to be the essence of freedom. "I still think of freedom as roasted chicken," he later acknowledged.

Shin decided to attempt to escape with Park. They formed a plan in which Shin would provide local information about the camp, while Park would use his knowledge once outside the camp to escape the country. On 2 January 2005, the pair was assigned to a work detail near the camp's electric fence on the top of a 1,200-foot (370 m) mountain ridge to collect firewood. Noting the long interval between the guards' patrols, the two waited until the guards were out of sight, then made their attempt to escape. Park attempted to go through first, but was fatally electrocuted climbing the high voltage fence. Shin managed to pass over the wire using Park's body as a shield to ground the current, but still suffered severe burns and permanent scars when his legs slipped onto the lowermost wire as he crawled over Park's body.

After escaping, Shin broke into a nearby farmer's barn and found an old military uniform. Wearing the uniform, he was able to masquerade as a North Korean soldier at times. He survived by scrounging and stealing food. Shin was unfamiliar with money, but within two days of his escape, he had sold a 10 lb (4.5 kg) bag of rice stolen from a house and used the money to buy cookies and cigarettes. Eventually, he reached the northern border with China along the Tumen River and bribed destitute North Korean border guards with food and cigarettes.

== Revision in 2015 ==
In January 2015, Shin contacted Blaine Harden and recanted parts of his story. Harden outlined the changes to Shin's account in a new foreword to his book, Escape from Camp 14, but did not revise every detail. He said a complete revision of the book would have taken months and he wanted to publish the new version as soon as possible.

Shin told Harden that he had changed some dates and locations and incorporated some "fictive elements" into the story. Shin said that he did not spend his entire North Korean life at Camp 14. He said that he was born there, but when he was young, his family was transferred to the less severe Camp 18, and spent several years there. He said that not only did he inform on the escape plan of his mother and brother, but also falsely implicated them in murder. He said that he twice escaped from Camp 18. The first time, in 1999, he was caught within days. The second time, in 2001, he said he crossed into China, but was caught after four months by Chinese police and sent back to North Korea. He said that he was tortured in Camp 14 in 2002, when he was 20 years old (not 13, as previously stated), as punishment for his escape. He said he was repeatedly burned and tortured in an underground prison for six months. As a result of education in Camp 18, and his previous escapes, he said he wasn't as naive about the outside world when he made his final escape from Camp 14 as he had previously described.

In Escape from Camp 14 Blaine Harden commented that, "Shin was the only available source of information about his early life." In his new foreword for the book in 2015, he described Shin as an "unreliable narrator" and commented that, "It seems prudent to expect new revisions", but also clarifying "I don’t know if that's true (that the story will change)". Harden theorized that "Shin appears to have been exposed to prolonged and repeated torture. We can expect that this would have a major impact on every aspect of who he is, on his memory, his emotional regulation, his ability to relate to others, his willingness to trust, his sense of place in the world, and the way he gives his testimony."

Korean specialist Andrei Lankov commented that "some suspicions had been confirmed when Shin suddenly admitted what many had hitherto suspected", described Harden's book as unreliable, and noted that defectors faced considerable psychological pressure to embroider their stories. Some defectors said his testimony is "completely lies". Kim Young-soon, another defector incarcerated at another camp (Camp 15), states that many defectors "embellish[ed] their stories, making things up and lying to make themselves more valuable." A former member of South Korea's National Intelligence Service said Shin had never lived in a "prison camp". The writer Simon Winchester commented that the "authority" of the UN Commission of Inquiry report was "somewhat challenged" by this revelation.

Shin explained he did not tell the full story because he wished to hide "that my mother and brother were executed because of my report," saying "the most important reason why I could not reveal all of the truth was because of my family." He went on to say "All I did until last September was discuss the camps as they were, but once the video was released [of his father], the nastiness of North Korea infuriated me. Then I realized I should not hold anything back."

== Post-North Korea life ==
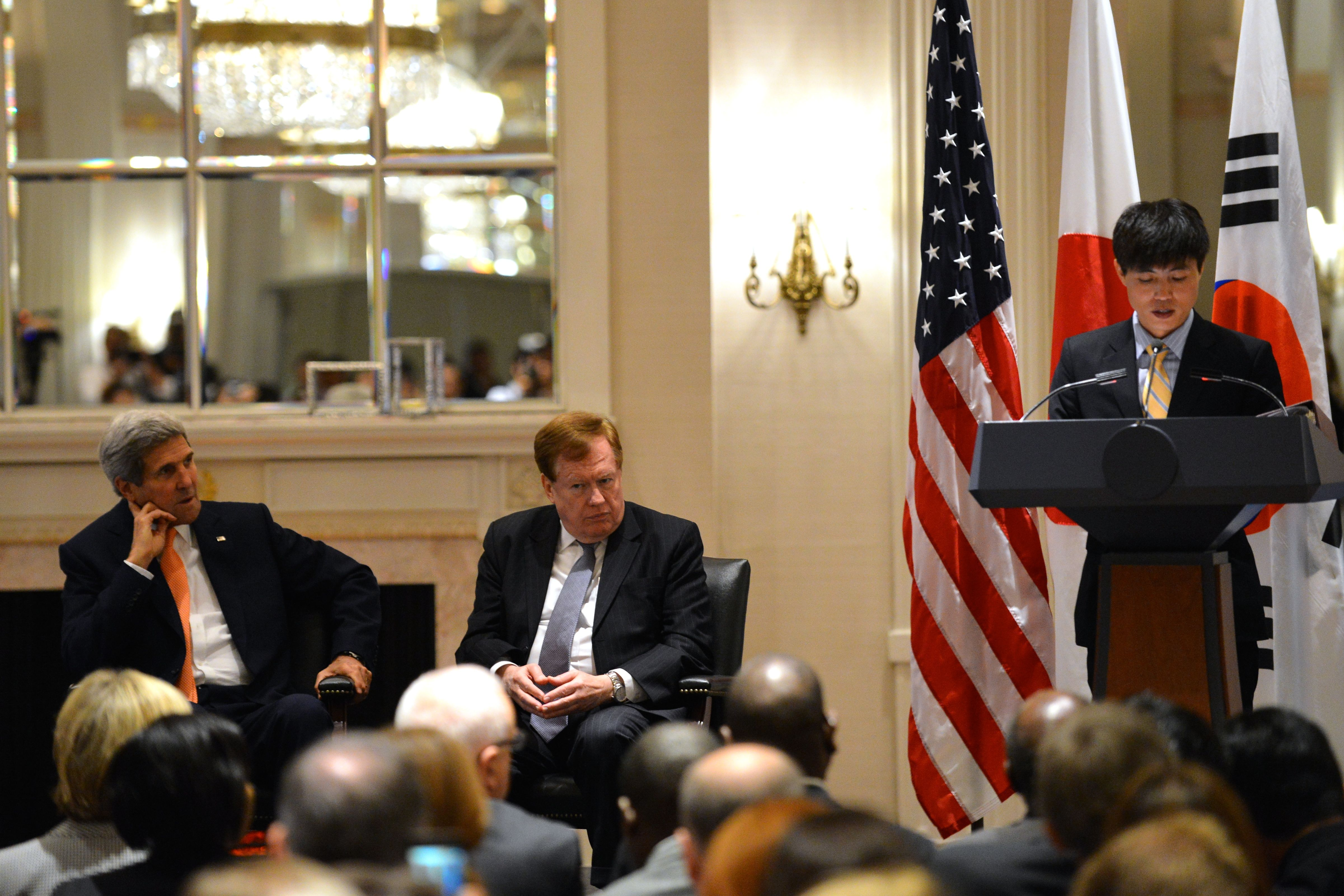
US Secretary of State John Kerry listens to Shin Dong-hyuk speak about his experiences in North Korea.

After spending some time working as a laborer in different parts of China, Shin was accidentally discovered by a journalist in a restaurant in Shanghai, and the reporter recognized the importance of his story. The journalist brought Shin to the South Korean consulate for asylum, and from there he traveled to South Korea, where he underwent extensive questioning from authorities to determine if he was a North Korean assassin or spy. Afterwards, his story was broadcast by the press and he published a Korean language memoir.

Shin later moved to Southern California, changing his name from Shin In Geun to Shin Dong-hyuk in "an attempt to reinvent himself as a free man," and worked for Liberty in North Korea (LiNK), a non-profit organization that raises awareness of human rights issues in North Korea and provides aid to North Korean refugees. Shin moved back to South Korea to campaign for the eradication of the North Korean prison camps.

In August 2013, Shin gave several hours of testimony to the United Nations' first commission of inquiry into human rights abuses of North Korea. A member of the UN commission described Shin as the world's "single strongest voice" on the atrocities inside North Korean camps.

Shin described some aspects of his personal life in South Korea in a Financial Times interview on popular culture saying that "I don't really know anything about music. I can't sing and I don't feel any emotion from it. But I do watch lots of films and the one that moves me the most is Schindler's List". On food he says "I know everything is delicious. I look at the colours and the way the food is presented on the plate but it's very difficult to choose. When I first came to South Korea, I was so greedy that I used to order too much food. Nowadays I try to order only as much as I can handle." Although Shin lives in South Korea, he was informally adopted by an American couple in Ohio during his time in the United States. He says he maintains the relationship, "I have a good relationship with my US foster parents. I contact them often. Whenever I have a holiday, I visit them. I think of them as good parents and I try to be a good son."

In December 2013, Shin wrote an open letter in the Washington Post to American basketball star Dennis Rodman who visited North Korea a number of times as a self-avowed "friend for life" of Kim Jong Un.

On June 30, 2017, Shin Dong-hyuk became a father. His wife Leeann gave birth to Lucas Yohan Shin.

== North Korean response ==
In 2012, when the United Nations Working Group on Arbitrary Detention asked the North Korean government about the status of Shin Dong-hyuk's father, they responded that there was no such person. Then in 2014, after identifying Shin Dong-hyuk as Shin In Geun, the North Korean government produced a video which attempted to discredit Shin through interviews with his father and other supposed witnesses. His father denied Shin had grown up in a prison camp. According to the video, Shin had worked in a mine and fled North Korea after being accused of raping a 13-year-old girl. It also said that Shin's mother and brother were guilty of murder. The video claimed he was now spreading "preposterous false information" about human rights. Shin confirmed the man was his father. He said that the rape allegation was a fabrication that he had heard before. He later confirmed that his mother and brother were convicted of murder, but stated they were innocent. Shin said that he believed the North Korean government was sending him a message to be quiet about human rights abuses or his father would be killed, in effect holding his father hostage. The video prompted Shin to recant parts of his story.

On September 24, 2014, the DPRK Permanent Representative Department to the United Nations issued a communique refuting the DPRK human rights report, including the "full text of the Shin Dong-hyuk information (신동혁 자료전문)." Next to the information also given in the videos, it included additional information on Shin's birthplace and his father: Shin was allegedly born in Soksan-ri, Pukchang, South Pyongan Province (평안남도 북창군 석산리) and later moved into Pongchang-ri, Pukchang, South Pyongan Province (평안남도 북창군 봉창리). He had committed an illegal border crossing to China and had been repatriated in 2002. Shin's father was born in 1944 in Ryongbuk-ri, Mundok, South Pyongan Province, not 1946. It was said that his father married Shin's mother in 1972 and was sent to prison in 1975 for theft of state property (국가재산략취행위죄).

== Books and films ==
In 2012, journalist Blaine Harden published Escape from Camp 14: One Man's Remarkable Odyssey from North Korea to Freedom in the West, based on his interviews with Shin. Harden gave a one-hour interview about the book on the C-SPAN television program Q&A.

Executive Director of the US Committee for Human Rights in North Korea, Greg Scarlatoiu, said the book played "an important role" in raising wider public awareness of the North Korean camps. Dalhousie University issued a statement averring that Shin's story, as told through the book, "has shifted the global discourse about North Korea, shining a light on the human rights abuses so prevalent within the regime."

A German documentary, Camp 14: Total Control Zone, directed by Marc Wiese, was released in 2012. It includes interviews with Shin Dong-hyuk and two former North Korean officers: the first, Kwon Hyuk, was a guard in Camp 22 and brought out amateur film footage (the only known footage of Camp 22), and the second, Oh Yang-nam, was a secret policeman who arrested people who were sent to camps. Supplementing the film are animated sequences of the camp created by Ali Soozandeh.

On 2 December 2012, Shin was featured on 60 Minutes during which he recounted to Anderson Cooper his story of his life in Camp 14 and escape. Shin said "when I see videos of the Holocaust it moves me to tears. I think I am still evolving—from an animal to a human."

== Awards and honours ==
In June 2013, Shin received the Moral Courage Award given by UN Watch, a Geneva-based NGO (non-governmental organization).

In May 2014, Shin was awarded an honorary Doctor of Laws degree from Dalhousie University (Nova Scotia, Canada). Students at the university "held a peace march and launched a social media campaign to raise awareness of human rights violations in North Korea. They then fundraised to bring Mr. Shin to Halifax, where his speech to an over-capacity crowd drew international attention."

== See also ==
- Human rights in North Korea
- Yeonmi Park
