= Kwanliso =

Concentration camps in North Korea

Kwanliso locations known to be currently in operation in North Korea (As of 2026; Pukch'ang and Kaechon camps are around 3 km (1.9 mi) apart).

Kwanliso (Korean: 관리소; Hanja: 管理所, Korean pronunciation: [kwanisʰo]) or kwalli-so in South Korean, (sometimes known as political prison camp, political labor camp, or concentration camp) is the term for political penal labor camps in North Korea. Imprisonment in them is the most severe form of punishment in the country besides capital punishment, and as a result, they have been described as concentration camps.

They constitute one of three forms of political imprisonment in the country, the other two are "short-term detention/forced-labor centers" (Note: Korean: 집결소; Hanja: 集結所; RR: jipgyeolso; MR: chipkyŏlso; lit. 'place(s) of gathering') and "long-term prison labor camps", (Note: Korean: 교화소; Hanja: 敎化所; RR: gyohwaso; MR: kyohwaso; lit. 'place(s) of reeducation') for misdemeanor and felony offenses respectively, according to the US-based Committee for Human Rights in North Korea. As of 2026 there are at least four kwanliso facilities in operation, with the largest being Hwasong.

Durations of imprisonment are variable. However, many prisoners are sentenced to hard labor for their whole lives. Forced labor duties within kwanliso typically include work in mines (known examples of such work include coal, gold, and iron ore mining), tree felling, timber cutting, or agricultural duties. Furthermore, camps contain state run prison farms and furniture manufacturing centers.

Estimates suggest that at the start of 2007, a total of six kwanliso camps were operating within the country. Despite fourteen kwanliso camps originally operating within North Korea, these later merged or were closed following the reallocation of prisoners.

== Origins and development ==
=== Historical emergence and conceptualization ===
In January 1979, a report was released by Amnesty International detailing the story of Alí Lameda, a Venezuelan poet imprisoned in North Korea. He had been arrested in 1967, held for a year without trial, placed on house arrest, then incarcerated again for six years, a portion of his twenty-year sentence. It was the first-ever report on human rights in North Korea. Yet this international awareness did not indicate something new, for long before this report was compiled, individuals had been systematically imprisoned for political crimes in North Korea for decades.

=== Stalinist and Maoist influences ===
From its inception, North Korea has maintained a complex relationship with Russia and China. Immediately after the end of the Korean War (1953), North Korea and Kim Il Sung looked to the Soviet Union and China for both economic and military support. Prior to the great split between the Soviet Union and China in the early 1960s, Kim visited both Moscow and Beijing often, but the split created enormous problems for Kim, who struggled to keep on good terms with both of them. To a large extent, he owed his career as well as his country's well-being to the Soviet Union and China, yet he was always wary of their dominant power. But the Sino-Soviet dispute also gave Kim Il Sung ample space to maneuver between the two great powers of communism, each of which was forced to tolerate his independence for fear of pushing him decisively to the opposite camp.

While according to North Korean propaganda, Kim is the sole originator of all policy, the original leader was not original in all of his ideas. Even Juche, hailed as the fundamental original Korean ideology, has been attributed to earlier Korean philosophers. In sum, the model for the prison camp system may have come from the gulags established by Joseph Stalin in the 1930s, which ironically might have come into North Korea as a reaction against a wave of de-Stalinization, led by the Soviet Union, in the 1950s. Another possibility is that Kim's departure from Soviet doctrine indicated a shift closer to Maoist China.

=== Development of the prison camp system ===
Map of the location of political prison camps (kwanliso) and ordinary prison camps (kyohwaso) in North Korea. Map issued in 2014 by the Commission of Inquiry on Human Rights in the DPRK, under the United Nations Human Rights Council.

North Korean history produced an endless wave after wave of persecuted individuals, yet there is no coherent trail showing when the political and penal mechanisms developed to systematically accommodate them. The story of persecuted groups in North Korea begins with the country's origin following Japan's defeat in WWII and the liberation of the Korean peninsula. In the North, Kim Il Sung systematically purged his political opponents, creating a highly centralized system that accorded him unlimited power and generated a formidable cult of personality. North Korea instituted a revolution that included genuinely popular reforms such as establishing an eight-hour work day, promoting literacy, and positing the formal equality of the sexes. However, it also included a purge of Koreans in the police and government bureaucracies who had collaborated with the Japanese colonization of Korea and a sweeping land reform program that expropriated the landholdings of absentee Japanese landlords and the native Korean landed aristocracy. Numerous purged police officials and disposed Korean landlords fled to the south, but their family members who remained in the north remained under suspicion, and many would end up imprisoned in the North Korean prison system. During the Korean War, North Koreans accused of collaboration with the United States, South Korea, and the United Nations Command were also imprisoned.

While Kim attempted to fuse returning Korean exiles (mostly members of the Chinese, Japanese, or Soviet Russian communist parties) into the Korean Workers Party, his plans for northern Korea were challenged by other Korean political parties affiliated with two religions: Protestant Christianity and an indigenous syncretic faith known as "Eastern Learning" (Donghak), later called "Church of the Heavenly Way" (Cheondogyo). These religious-based social movements had led the internal opposition to Japanese colonial rule in Korea and were very well organized in the northern areas of the Korean peninsula. One of these leaders was actually a first choice by the Soviets (over Kim Il Sung) to lead the newly minted North Korean state in 1945, but he turned down the invitation. Suppressing these non-communist parties led to numerous arrests and executions. And again, family members who remained in the north remained under suspicion.

Another round of purges occurred during the fallout after the attempt to overthrow Kim Il Sung in 1956. Here, the practice of "self-criticism" was introduced. People at all levels of the party, including Politburo members and government ministers, were forced to undergo these purposefully humiliating displays of dedication to the Party. These were uniquely cruel, as some victims were ousted from their jobs while a smaller number of individuals even lost their lives. This 1950s wave of persecution finally left the only faction Kim Il Sung desired: his loyal band of Manchuria-based, communist, anti-Japanese partisans who became the enduring foundation of the present North Korean regime. Yet, there are no references in the documentation to a collectivization process or a systemic means of imprisoning accused "traitors" in dedicated camps.

Today, the internment camps for people accused of political offenses or denounced as politically unreliable are reportedly run by the Ministry of State Security. Yet in practice, the distribution of roles between the respective security agencies has apparently varied over time and between provinces, influenced by political priorities, available capacity, the relative power of senior officials, and the extent to which a particular agency enjoyed the trust of the supreme leader. In many cases, the three main security agencies—State Security Department, Ministry of People's Security, and Military Security Command—competed to show their efficiency in identifying ideological opponents to gain favor with the leader. In relation to incidents or issues seen as major political threats, the leader or central-level decision-making organs required security agencies to coordinate their investigations. There are reports, for example, that semi-permanent structures were set up by secret order of Kim Jong Il and maintained under Kim Jong Un.

Such a huge prison camp system – operating in secret and completely outside the law and the reach of the law, such as is the case in North Korea – risks becoming a dumping ground for all sorts of persons. It is widely suspected that the North Korean camps, then, became the sites for un-repatriated South Korean prisoners of war from the Korean War, or for other South Korean and Japanese citizens who have been abducted by North Korean security and police operatives over the course of the last thirty to forty years of the 20th century, and into the 21st century.

== Population ==
In 2013, there were between 80,000 and 120,000 political prisoners in North Korean imprisonment camps. The number is down from 150,000–200,000 during the 1990s and early 2000s, due to releases, deaths, and also the near-abandonment of the family responsibility principle, where immediate family members of a convicted political criminal were also regarded as political criminals and imprisoned. The earliest estimates were from 1982, when the number was thought to be 105,000.

== Camp locations ==
Kwanliso locations in North Korea

North Korea's prison camps consist of a series of sprawling encampments measuring kilometers long and kilometers wide. The number of these encampments has varied over time. They are located mostly in the valleys between high mountains in the northern provinces of North Korea. There are between 5,000 and 50,000 prisoners per camp.

As typical for prisons, kwanliso are usually surrounded at their outer perimeters by barbed-wire fences punctuated with guard towers and patrolled by heavily armed guards. The encampments include self-contained, closed "village" compounds for single persons, usually the alleged wrongdoers, and other closed, fenced-in "villages" for the extended families of the wrongdoers.

The following lists former or currently operating kwanliso prisons:

- Prison camp No. 14: Kaech'ŏn, South Pyongan province
- Prison camp No. 16: Myonggan, North Hamgyong province.
- Prison camp No. 18: Pukch'ang, South Pyongan province.
- Prison camp No. 25: Ch'ŏngjin, North Hamgyong province.

== Camp closures ==
Notable kwanliso closures are listed below:

- In 1989, Camp No. 11 in Kyŏngsŏng County, North Hamgyong Province was closed to convert the area into a villa for Kim Il Sung. Approximately 20,000 family prisoners were transferred to other political penal labor camps.
- Prison camp No. 12 in Onsŏng County, North Hamgyong Province was also closed in 1989 because the camp was deemed too close to the Chinese border. The prisoners were transferred to Camp No. 22.
- At the end of 1990, Camp No. 13 in Chongsŏng, also Onsŏng County, was closed. Approximately 20,000 prisoners were relocated after fears that the camp was located too close to the Chinese border.
- Camp No. 15 in Yodok County, South Hamgyong Province was closed in 2014 to create a model prison as part of a campaign to whitewash North Korea's human rights record.
- Camp No. 17 in Toksong County, South Hamgyong Province was closed in 1984, and approximately 30,000-40,000 prisoners were relocated to help develop a mine in Camp No. 18. There has been ongoing speculation about the camp being re-opened some time in 2014, after Kim Jong-Un took power.
- Camp No. 19 in Tanchon, South Hamgyong Province was closed in 1990 to decrease the amount of political prison camps.
- Prison camp No. 22 in Hoeryong, North Hamgyong Province was closed in 2012 and approximately 3,000 remaining prisoners were relocated to Camp No. 16. The camp was closed after the warden running it and an officer defected.
- Camp No. 23 in Toksong, South Hamgyong Province was shut down in 1987 with all prisoners being released.
- Camp No. 24 in Tongsin, Chagang Province was closed in 1990.
- Camp No. 26 in Sŭngho's Hwachŏn-dong was closed in January 1991.
- Camp No. 27 at Ch'ŏnma, North Pyongan Province was closed in 1990 for unknown reasons.

== Legislative structure ==
The imprisonment camps are run by the State Security Department, North Korea's secret police agency and was nicknamed in 2023 as North Korea's Thought Police and are therefore not specifically tied to the laws and courts of North Korea. However, each camp is expected to operate in strict accordance with state Juche ideology.

=== Operating principles ===
Detainees are regularly told that they are traitors to the nation who have betrayed their leader and thus deserve execution, but whom the Workers' Party has decided, in its mercy, not to kill, but to keep alive in order to repay the nation for their treachery, through forced labor for the rest of their lives. The emphasis of these camps is very much placed upon collective responsibility where individuals ultimately take responsibility for their own class's "wrongdoing". Kwanliso guards emphasize this point by reportedly carving excerpts from Kim Il Sung's speeches into wood signs and door entrances. Work teams are given stringent work quotas, and the failure to meet them means even further reduced food rations.

=== Working conditions ===
Below-subsistence level food rations coupled with hard, forced labor results in a high level of deaths in detention not only as a result of working to death but also by rife disease caused by poor hygiene conditions. Corn rations are the usual staple diet of any prisoner but these may be supplemented by other foods found during labor such as weeds and animals. Each five-person work group has an informant, as does every prison camp "village". Survivors and commentators have compared the conditions of these camps to those operated in Central and Eastern Europe by Nazi Germany during World War II in the Holocaust calling the DPRK's network of political prison camps the North Korean Holocaust. There have also been comparisons between the North Korean network of political prison camps to the penal labor colonies of the USSR under Joseph Stalin, with many Western media outlets describing "Kwanliso" as "North Korea's Gulag".

== Internment of prisoners ==
Defector statements suggest prisoners come to the camps in two ways:

- Individuals are likely taken and escorted by the State Security Department, detained in small cells and subjected to intense and prolonged interrogation, involving beatings and severe torture, after which they are dispatched to one of the prison labor camps.
- Family members: The primary suspect in the family is firstly escorted to the prison camp, and the Bowibu officers later escort family members from their home to the encampment. Family members are usually allowed to bring their own goods with them into the camp; however, these are usually only used by prisoners as bribing commodities later on.

== Encampment outlay ==
Guard towers and barbed wire fences usually demark camp boundaries apart from where terrain is impassable. Prisoners are housed within scattered villages usually at the base of valleys and mountains. Single inhabitants are sub grouped accordingly into an assigned communal cafeterias and dormitories and families are usually placed into shack rooms and are required to feed themselves.

=== Zoning of prison camps ===
Areas of the encampments are zoned or designated accordingly for individuals or families of the wrong-doers or wrong-thinkers. Both individuals and families are further sub divided accordingly into either a "revolutionary processing zone" or "total control zone":

- The "revolutionary processing zone" (Korean: 혁명화구역; MR: hyŏngmyŏnghwa kuyŏk) accommodates prisoners having the opportunity of future release from the camp back into society. Thus these prisoners are likely ideologically re-educated in so called "revolutionizing" areas of the camp – tasks include forced memorization of speeches by Kim Il Sung and Kim Jong Il with specific emphasis placed on re-education of children. A revolutionary processing zone is thought to be operating in Pukch'ang concentration camp and also at Yodŏk concentration camp in South Hamgyong Province.
- There is no reported re-education of prisoners in "total control zones" (Korean: 완전통제구역; MR: wanjŏn t'ongje kuyŏk) presumably because these prisoners are not seen fit to be released and are deemed counter-revolutionary.

== Awareness ==
According to North Korean defectors, ordinary North Korean citizens are aware that the camps exist, if not the exact locations. Political prisoners are referred to as the "people who are sent to the mountains".

== Demand for closure ==
Amnesty International summarizes the human rights situation North Korea's kwanliso camps: "Men, women and children in the camp face forced hard labor, inadequate food, beatings, totally inadequate medical care and unhygienic living conditions. Many fall ill while in prison, and a large number die in custody or soon after release." The organization demands the immediate closure of all other political prison camps in North Korea. The demand is supported by the International Coalition to Stop Crimes against Humanity in North Korea, a coalition of over 40 human rights organizations.

== See also ==
- Human rights in North Korea
- Prisons in North Korea
- Forced labor in the Soviet Union
- Gulag
- Nazi concentration camps
- Great Leap Forward
- Year Zero (political notion)
- List of concentration and internment camps#Korea, Democratic People's Republic of
