= Chongjin concentration camp =

Concentration camp in North Korea

Coordinates: 41°50′01″N 129°43′32″E

- Kwan-li-so No. 25 Chongjin
- Hangul: 청진 제25호 관리소
- Hanja: 淸津第二十五號管理所
- RR: Cheongjin je25ho gwalliso
- MR: Ch'ŏngjin che25ho kwalliso

Chongjin concentration camp
- Hangul: 청진 정치범 수용소
- Hanja: 淸津政治犯收容所
- RR: Cheongjin jeongchibeom suyongso
- MR: Ch'ŏngjin chŏngch'ibŏm suyongso

Location of Chongjin camp in North Korea

Kwan-li-so (Penal-labour colony) No. 25 Chongjin (Korean: 청진 제25호 관리소), often known outside North Korea as Chongjin concentration camp (청진 정치범 수용소; also spelled Ch'ŏngjin), is a political labour camp (kwalliso) in North Korea located in the North Hamgyong Province. Satellite images show a major expansion of the camp after 2010.

== Location ==
The camp is located in the city of Chongjin in the North Hamgyong province of North Korea. It is situated in Suseong district (Susŏng-dong) of Songpyong-guyok, around 7 km (4.3 mi) northwest of the city center and 1 km (0.62 mi) west of Susŏng River (Susŏngch'on).

== Description ==
Chongjin camp is a lifetime prison. Like the other political prison camps it is controlled by the state security agency. But while the other camps include many vast prison-labour colonies in remote mountain valleys, Chongjin camp is only one big prison building complex similar to the reeducation camps. The camp is around 500 m (1500 ft) long and 500 m (1500 ft) wide, surrounded by high walls and fences, and equipped with guard towers. The number of prisoners is estimated to be between 3000 and 5000.

== Purpose ==
The main purpose of the camp is to isolate political prisoners from society. The prisoners are exploited for hard labour to be performed in the prison factories. Popular North Korean consumer products like Kalmaegi bicycles are manufactured by prisoners using hand tools.

== Human rights situation ==
Ahn Myung-chul (a former prison guard in Hoeryong concentration camp) described Chongjin camp as a top-level political prisoner camp, therefore harsh conditions can be assumed.

== Camp expansion ==
Detailed analysis of satellite images shows a major expansion of the camp perimeter in 2010. The size of the camp increased 72 percent, from 580 m^{2} (6,200 ft^{2}) to now 1,000 m^{2} (11,000 ft^{2}). Along the new fence line, 17 additional guard posts were erected. In the eastern part of the new perimeter, several new buildings were erected from 2011 to 2013, possibly to be used as prisoner housing.

== Prisoners (witnesses) ==
There are a few first-hand witness accounts on the camp; however, there are some reports that North Korean defectors are prisoners in Chongjin camp. Lim Kook-jae, a South Korean abducted to North Korea in 1987 aboard the Dong Jin 27, died in Chongjin camp, according to a human rights organization. Jin Gyeong-suk was also detained at Chongjin camp in 2004 and died there the following year. Many pastors and presbyters, dissident Korean-Japanese, and people expelled from Pyongyang with their families are detained in Chongjin camp, according to the 9th International Conference on North Korean Human Rights and Refugees.

== See also ==
- Human rights in North Korea
- Prisons in North Korea
- Yodok concentration camp
- Kaechon internment camp
- Camp 22
