= Sangil =

Sangil may be:

- Sangil language
- Sangil (Sangirese) people
- Sangil Station, Korea
