= Hwasong concentration camp =

Concentration camp in North Korea

Coordinates: 41°16′07″N 129°23′28″E

- Kwan-li-so No. 16 Hwasong
- Chosŏn'gŭl: 화성 제16호 관리소
- Hancha: 化城第十六號管理所
- Revised Romanization: Hwaseong Je16ho Gwalliso
- McCune–Reischauer: Hwasŏng Che16ho Kwalliso

- Hwasong concentration camp
- Hangul: 화성 정치범수용소
- Hanja: 化城政治犯收容所
- Revised Romanization: Hwaseong Jeongchibeom Suyongso
- McCune–Reischauer: Hwasŏng Chŏngch'ibŏm Suyongso

Location of Hwasong camp in North Korea

Kwan-li-so (Penal-labor Colony) No. 16 Hwasong (Chosŏn'gŭl: 화성 제16호 관리소), often known outside North Korea as the Hwasong concentration camp (Hangul: 화성 정치범수용소; also spelled Hwasŏng or Hwaseong), is the largest political labor camp (kwalliso) in North Korea. Located in rural North Hamgyong Province, Hwasong is highly secretive and isolated from the rest of the country. Prisoners, usually imprisoned for life, are subject to harsh forced labor and treatment. The estimated prisoner population size is 20,000.

The camp is located in the mountains of Myonggan County (formerly called Hwasong County), and its activities mostly consist of logging, agriculture, and some industrial production. However, the camp is also notable for its proximity to the Punggye-ri Nuclear Test Site, leading to suspicions over its connections to North Korea's development of nuclear weapons. Camp expansions in recent decades and changes in camp features indicate enhanced security measures and the need to accommodate increased prisoner populations and economic activities.

== Location ==
The camp is located in Myonggan County (Hwasong County), North Hamgyong Province in North Korea. It is situated along the upper reaches of the Hwasong River in a secluded, rural mountain valley. The western border is Mantapsan, a 2,205-metre-high (7,234 ft) mountain. On the north and east sides, the camp reaches the Orangchon River valley. The entrance gate is right on the Hwasong River and on the road from Hwasong, 8 km (5.0 mi) west of Hwasong-up (Myonggan-up). The camp is not included in maps, but the entrance gate and the ring fence with watchtowers can be recognized on satellite images. A secondary entrance exists on the camp's eastern perimeter, 7 km (4.35 mi) east of the camp's primary administrative and support area at P’aeŭidŏk.

The camp is connected to North Korea's national rail network via the station at Haryegumi, 1.75 km (1.09 mi) away from the main entrance. The closest air facility is the Korean People's Air Force Irhayang-dong Airfield, 13 km (8.08 mi) east of the main entrance. Two additional facilities of note include the P’unggye-ri nuclear test facility, which is 2.5 km (1.55 mi) to the west of Camp 16, and the Orangchon No. 2 Power Station 2.5 km east of the camp perimeter.

== Description ==
Hwasong Camp is a penal-labor colony in which detainees are imprisoned for life with no chance to be released. With around 549 km^{2} (212 sq mi) in area it is the largest prison camp in North Korea. Puhwa-ri (Chosŏn'gŭl: 부화리), 4 km (2.5 mi) north of the entrance gate, is the camp headquarters. The number of prisoners is estimated at 20,000. They are classified as "anti-revolutionary and anti-party elements" and held on charges such as opposing the succession of Kim Jong-il. Many of the prisoners are merely family members of suspected wrongdoers, who are held captive in a "guilt-by-association" punishment. It is believed that the camp was founded in the 1990s; later satellite imagery analysis of the camp dated the camp to at least 1983. Camp 16 remains operational, and is a mature and well-maintained political prison camp. Its activities are primarily focused on logging and agriculture, with smaller instances of mining, light industry, and hydroelectric power production.

Contrary to popular belief, the security perimeter of Camp 16 is not composed of a single continuous wall or fence, but instead consists of a network of security fences, patrol paths and 35 guard positions established along obvious routes of escape. Only the lower third of the camp has an actual fence, while most of the camp is patrolled by troops on foot or small vehicles, supplemented by internal roads and guard positions that may indicate distinct sections of the camp. The rugged terrain of the camp's surroundings and harsh weather conditions also likely deter escape attempts. This perimeter encompasses numerous villages within the camp area, 53 of which are named and many others unnamed, and is said to be a "total control zone" divided into three "towns" with differing levels of privileges for prisoners, depending on the severity of their crime. However, these "towns" and their zones of control are not precisely defined.

== Working conditions ==
Prisoners are exploited for hard, dangerous, and deadly labor in mining, logging, and agriculture. According to Mr. Lee, a former security officer in Hwasong camp, the inmates were overworked and had very little time to rest. Prisoners had to work all day until they fulfilled their quotas and attend self-criticism meetings afterward. Often they were allowed to sleep only four hours in the night. Mr. Lee witnessed many fatal accidents in the workplace.

== Suspected connections to nuclear weapons development ==
The North Korean nuclear tests made in 2006, 2009, 2013 and 2016 at Punggye-ri Nuclear Test Site is just 2 km (1.2 mi) to the west of the camp border. Several defectors reported that political prisoners were forced to dig tunnels and build underground facilities in areas exposed to nuclear radiation.

The existence of a 5.2-kilometre-long (3.23 mi) switchback road running from the Punggye-ri Tunnel No. 1, where underground nuclear tests are conducted, to the perimeter of Camp 16 also seems to suggest a connection between the political prison camp and North Korea's development of nuclear weapons. The road dates back to 2005, though there are no first-hand accounts of it from former guards, escapees or witnesses. Four possible explanations for the road have been put forth:

- Use for Forced Labour Transport: Camp 16 provides a readily available source of manual labour, and the sensitive nature of the nuclear program provides a plausible cause for North Korea to deploy a labour force over which it exercises total control. The design of Camp 16's perimeter allows prisoners to be walked across the boundary onto the switchback road without needing permanent guard posts or gates.
- Use for Monitoring Equipment: Images show three short paths branching off from the switchback, ending in cleared platforms plotted along the conjectured layout of Tunnel No. 1, suggesting the use of monitoring equipment to measure test results.
- Use for Geologic Testing: To determine the suitability of nuclear test sites, geologic and seismic testing is required. The switchback road predates the 2006 nuclear test and its layout across the mountainside might have provided access to drilling sites associated with Tunnel No. 1.
- Use for Nuclear Test Facility Security: The lack of a complete security fence around Camp 16 requires foot patrols along the perimeter to prevent incursions into the nuclear test facility by prisoners or other unauthorised personnel. The switchback provides access to the northernmost parts of the facility, and is also the only identified path reaching the facility's eastern boundary.

== Human rights situation ==
Information is extremely limited, as the camp has always been a maximum security camp under strict control and surveillance. An unidentified teenager reported how he was sent to the camp with his entire family at age 13. He witnessed his father being beaten cruelly and his mother and sisters being raped by security officers. Residents from nearby villages heard about the horrific conditions inside the camp but were never allowed to get near the camp.

Security officer Lee explained the methods to execute prisoners in an interview with Amnesty International. He witnessed prisoners forced to dig their own graves and being killed with hammer blows to their necks. He also witnessed prison officers strangling detainees and then beating them to death with wooden sticks. According to him, several women were raped by the officials and executed secretly thereafter.

Apart from the use of forced labor under poor conditions, there are also concerns over prisoners' health as a result of the camp's proximity to the Punggye-ri nuclear test facility. They are at risk from accidental radiation leaks, as is suspected to have occurred during the 2006 and 2013 nuclear tests.

== Camp expansion ==
Analysis of satellite images by Amnesty International in October 2013 shows that the prisoner population of Hwasong camp has slightly increased compared to 2008. In several prisoner villages, new housing structures and new administrative buildings can be identified. Some of the new prisoners may have been relocated from Hoeryong concentration camp to Hwasong. More construction since then has been identified in a 2015 image analysis report by HRNK, which pointed out the emergence of new housing and support buildings in the camp's various villages, suggesting a further significant increase in the prisoner population.

The camp's security perimeter has also changed over time. Sections of the western perimeter moved east during 2010–2015, supported by double and triple-walled guard positions, while the extreme northwest section expanded during 2006–2009 to develop logging operations. Meanwhile, segments of the eastern perimeter shifted west since 2010 to support logging and economic development along the Orangchon River.

== Former prisoners/guards (witnesses) ==
- Besides an unidentified teenager, no former prisoner was found to provide direct testimony, for fear of retribution.
- Mr. Lee (full name withheld for his safety; served between the 1980s to mid-1990s in Hwasong) was a security officer in the camp.

== See also ==
- Human rights in North Korea
- Prisons in North Korea
- Yodok concentration camp
- Kaechon internment camp
