= Political repression =

Act of state entity involving restriction on the political freedom of citizens

Political repression is the act of a state entity controlling a citizenry by force for political reasons, particularly for the purpose of restricting or preventing the citizenry's ability to take part in the political life of a society, thereby reducing their standing among their fellow citizens. Repression tactics target the citizenry who are most likely to challenge the political ideology of the state in order for the government to remain in control. In autocracies, the use of political repression is to prevent anti-regime support and mobilization. It is often manifested through policies such as human rights violations, surveillance abuse, police brutality, kangaroo courts, imprisonment, involuntary settlement, stripping of citizen's rights, lustration, and violent action or terror such as murder, summary executions, torture, forced disappearance, and other extrajudicial punishment of political activists, dissidents, or the general population. Direct repression tactics are those targeting specific actors who become aware of the harm done to them while covert tactics rely on the threat of citizenry being caught (wiretapping and monitoring). The effectiveness of the tactics differs: covert repression tactics cause dissidents to use less detectable opposition tactics while direct repression allows the citizenry to witness and react to the repression. Political repression can also be reinforced by means outside of written policy, such as by public and private media ownership and by self-censorship within the public.

Where political repression is sanctioned and organised by the state, it may constitute state terrorism, genocide, politicide or crimes against humanity. Systemic and violent political repression is a typical feature of dictatorships, totalitarian states and similar regimes. While the use of political repression varies depending on the authoritarian regime, it is argued that repression is a defining feature and the foundation of autocracies by creating a power hierarchy between the leader and citizenry, contributing to the longevity of the regime. Repressive activities have also been found within democratic contexts as well. This can even include setting up situations where the death of the target of repression is the result. If political repression is not carried out with the approval of the state, a section of government may still be responsible. Some examples are the COINTELPRO operations by the FBI from 1956 to 1971 and the Palmer Raids from 1919 to 1920.

In some states, "repression" can be an official term used in legislation or the names of government institutions. The Soviet Union had a legal policy of repression of political opposition defined in its penal code and Cuba under Fulgencio Batista had a secret police agency officially named the Bureau for the Repression of Communist Activities. According to Soviet and communist studies scholar Stephen Wheatcroft, in the case of the Soviet Union terms such as "the terror", "the purges" and "repression" are used to refer to the same events. He believes the most neutral terms are repression and mass killings, although in Russian the broad concept of repression is commonly held to include mass killings and is sometimes assumed to be synonymous with it, which is not the case in other languages.

== In political conflict ==
Political conflict strongly increases the likelihood of state repression. This is arguably the most robust finding in social science research on political repression. Civil wars are a strong predictor of repressive activity, as are other forms of challenges from non-government actors. States so often engage in repressive behaviors in times of civil conflict that the relationship between these two phenomena has been termed the "Law of Coercive Responsiveness". When their authority or legitimacy is threatened, regimes respond by overtly or covertly suppressing dissidents to eliminate the behavioral threat. State repression subsequently affects dissident mobilization, though the direction of this effect is still an open question. Some strong evidence suggests that repression suppresses dissident mobilization by reducing the capacity of challengers to organize, yet it is also feasible that challengers can leverage state repressive behavior to spur mobilization among sympathizers by framing repression as a new grievance against the state.

== Violence ==
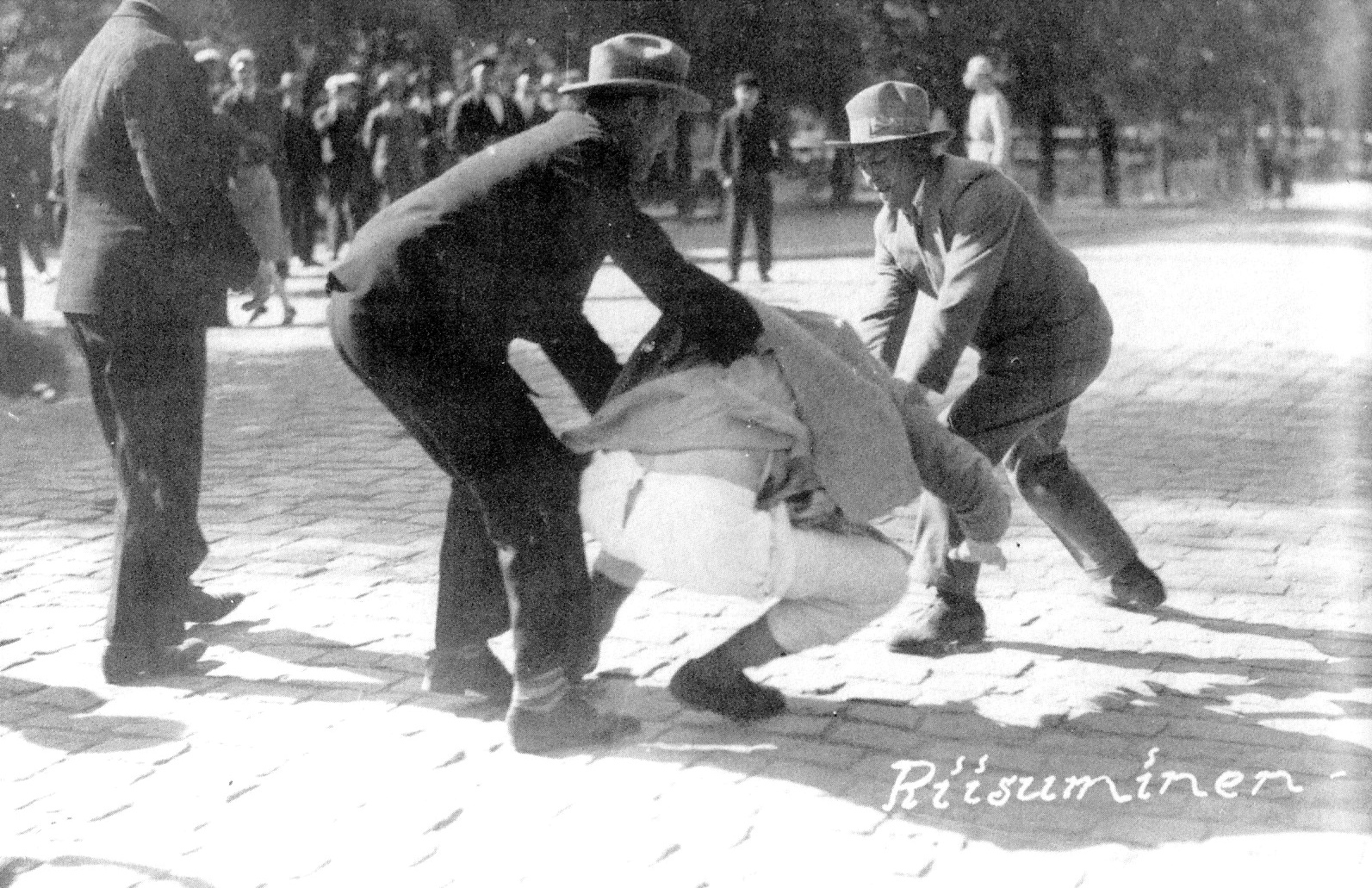
Members of the right-wing Lapua Movement assault a former Red Guard officer and the publisher of the communist newspaper at the Vaasa riot on June 4, 1930, in Vaasa, Finland.

Political repression is often accompanied by violence, which might be legal or illegal according to domestic law. Violence can both eliminate political opposition directly by killing opposition members, or indirectly by instilling fear.

== State terrorism ==
When political repression is sanctioned and organized by the state, situations of state terrorism, genocide and crimes against humanity can be reached. Systematic and violent political repression is a typical feature of dictatorships, totalitarian states and similar regimes. In these regimes, acts of political repression can be carried out by the police and secret police, the army, paramilitary groups and death squads. Sometimes regimes considered the democratic exercise political repression and state terrorism to other states as part of their security policy.

== Direct vs. indirect repression ==
Direct repression is a form of repression where the state targets an opposing political actor by obvious violent action. The target is clearly aware of the harm that is caused to their life and livelihood. Direct repression does not exclusively occur within the boundaries of a state, but also across borders. In personalist dictatorships, initiating conflicts with other states and people outside their own borders is more common because of a lack of accountability via extremely limited or no competitive elections.

Indirect repression relies on the threat of violence which constitutes harassment, intimidation, and administrative blockages. These tactics tend to be non-violent, yet still are built to control citizenry.

== Repressive success and monitoring ==
Individuals indirectly exposed to repression self-report higher trust in the leader and the ruling party. This phenomenon was observed in Zimbabwe under Robert Mugabe, where the effects of repression increased approaching elections, even with deteriorating social and economic conditions. A large signifier of whether or not repression is successful in a state is evidence of preference falsification– where the preference expressed by an individual in public diverges from their private preference. In North Korea, accused of highly repressive activity in media and public culture, 100% of citizens vote in ‘no choice’ parliamentary elections so the state can identify defectors. Citizens are required to show complete devotion to North Korea's current leader and sacrifice their safety if they choose to speak out. Repressive measures including prison camps, torture, forced labor, and threats of execution are just some of the costs of defection. The Chinese Communist Party implements extensive surveillance measures in the People's Republic of China, including Internet censorship, camera monitoring, and other forms of mass surveillance. These practices involve technologies such as AI, facial recognition, fingerprint identification, voice and iris recognition, big data analysis, DNA testing, and are closely linked to the Social Credit System in mainland China. At the same time, many domestic Chinese technology companies are also involved in the country's large-scale surveillance programs. These primarily include companies such as Hikvision, Sensetime, Huawei, ZTE, and others.

== Contemporary examples ==
Political repression often involves the use of legal, administrative, or extrajudicial measures to neutralize political opponents. In Turkey, Istanbul Mayor Ekrem İmamoğlu, a leading opposition figure, was arrested in March 2025 and subsequently indicted on 142 counts ranging from bribery to organized crime. The chief prosecutor’s 4,000-page indictment sought an aggregate prison term exceeding 2,000 years if he were convicted. İmamoğlu denied the charges and opposition leaders described the prosecution as politically motivated, with CHP spokesman Özgür Özel calling it “entirely political” and aimed at preventing İmamoğlu from running as the party’s candidate in the 2028 presidential election. The Turkish judiciary has detained other opposition politicians as well - 15 opposition mayors remain in jail.

In Russia, opposition leader Alexei Navalny, head of the Anti-Corruption Foundation, was sentenced in March 2022 to nine years in prison on fraud and contempt charges, which Reuters reported would “keep President Vladimir Putin’s most prominent opponent out of active politics.” Authorities later added 19 years to his sentence, which he and Western governments condemned as politically motivated. Similarly, Crimean Tatar leader Ilmi Ümerov was convicted of “separatism” by a Russian-controlled court in 2017 following Russia’s annexation of Crimea; his sentence of two years in a penal colony was criticized as politically motivated and disproportionately harsh given his health, and he was released later that year in a prisoner swap. In Myanmar, former de facto leader Aung San Suu Kyi was detained during the February 2021 military coup and subsequently convicted on multiple counts, receiving a total sentence of 33 years. Human rights organizations condemned the trials as sham proceedings aimed at eliminating her as a political threat.

== See also ==
- 1989 Tiananmen Square protests and massacre
- Abuse of process
- An unjust law is no law at all
- Anti-communist mass killings
- Arbitrary arrest and detention
- Censorship
- État légal
- Enforced disappearance
- Ideological repression
- Judicial persecution
- Know your customer#Political repression
- List of banned political parties
- Mass killings under communist states
- Mass surveillance
- Massacre
- Nanny state
- Persecution
- Political censorship
- Political repression in North Korea
- Political repression in the Islamic Republic of Iran
- Political repression in the Soviet Union
- Red Terror
- Religious persecution
- Restrictions on political parties
- State terrorism
- White Terror
