= Jin Gyeong-suk =

North Korean defector (1980–2004)

- 진경숙
- Born: 24 June 1980
- Died: 31 December 2004 (aged 24); Chongjin, North Korea
- Other name: Jin Kyung-sook
- Citizenship: North Korea, South Korea
- Known for: North Korean defector

Jin Gyeong-suk (Korean: 진경숙; 24 June 1980 – 31 December 2004), also known as Jin Kyung-sook, was a North Korean woman who, after successfully defecting to South Korea in 2002, was arrested in China two years later for conducting espionage and forcefully deported back to North Korea, where she was tortured and murdered.

== Kidnapping ==
In August 2004, Jin, who had acquired South Korean citizenship after her arrival there two years earlier, and her husband, Mun Jeong-hun, traveled on their honeymoon to the Jilin Province in northern China. Commissioned by a Japanese film production company, the couple had planned to make a video about the involvement of North Korea in the drug trade. In this context, they met a supposed middle-man on the Chinese side of the Tumen River, which forms a border between China and North Korea. This middle-man was supposed to smuggle a video camera into North Korea, to facilitate gathering of evidence on film of the drug production taking place there. The meeting with the middle-man turned out to be a trap. Jin and her husband were abducted by four men disguised as road construction workers, but who, it is believed, were agents of the North Korean secret service. While her husband managed to escape, Jin Gyeong-suk was forced into a sack and transported across the Tumen River into North Korea. Later investigations showed that she was deported to the Chongjin concentration camp in the northern Hamgyong Province, where she was interrogated, tortured, and eventually murdered.

=== Reactions ===
The case proved to be politically highly charged for two reasons:

1. Since Jin held a South Korean passport, the case involved the kidnapping of a South Korean national on Chinese soil. Thus both South Korea and China were also involved. As a North Korean citizen, the legal situation of Jin would have been a different one, since China maintains a practice of turning over defectors from North Korea to the North Korean authorities. Chinese authorities asserted that, at the time of kidnapping, Jin was actually located on North Korean territory to help her sister escape from North Korea.
2. The question arose whether Jin had actually been kidnapped or only arrested in accordance with North Korean law. That law stipulates a punishment for foreign nationals suspected of espionage of up to seven years imprisonment in a labor camp. Since she held a South Korean passport, such law could have applied to Jin Gyeong-suk. A South Korean government official said: "We are always telling defectors that China is a dangerous place for them, but these incidents happen. We cannot comprehend how you could claim your right to free travel and then try to sell a North Korean video identified as a North Korean defector."

=== Petitions for release ===
Jin's abduction to North Korea garnered a flurry of media attention. Various human rights organizations intervened, seeking Jin's release; they attempted as well to determine whether Jin was still alive. After hearing from a reliable source that her daughter had died by January 2005, the family petitioned to then South Korean president Roh Moo-hyun to ascertain her fate and, if alive, push for her return to South Korea, without, however, receiving a response from the president.

== Murder ==
Jin died around December 31, 2004, at the Chongjin concentration camp. The cause of death was determined to be the result of the residual effects of torture to which she had been subjected.

== See also ==
- List of kidnappings
- Lists of solved missing person cases
