= Onsong concentration camp =

Political prison camp in North Korea

- Chosŏn'gŭl: 온성 제12호 관리소
- Hancha: 穩城第十二號管理所
- Revised Romanization: Onseong Je Sipi-ho Gwalliso
- McCune–Reischauer: Onsŏng Che Sibi-ho Kwalliso
- Chosŏn'gŭl: 온성 정치범수용소
- Hancha: 穩城政治犯收容所
- Revised Romanization: Onseong Jeongchibeum Suyongso
- McCune–Reischauer: Onsŏng Chŏngch'ibŏm Suyongso

The Onsong concentration camp was an internment camp in Changpyong, Onsong County, North Hamgyong, North Korea. It housed approximately 15,000 political prisoners. The camp was officially known as Concentration Camp (Kwan-li-so) No. 12.

Although information about the camp is scarce, two defectors have alleged the forcible suppression of a large riot in May 1987 at the camp. According to the testimony of Ahn Myong-chol, a guard at a similar camp, and Mun Hyon-il, a nearby resident, the riot started when one political prisoner at the camp killed a guard in the camp's coal mine in protest of the guard's treatment of another prisoner; he was then joined by 200 others at the scene who overcame and beat to death another guard. The prisoners then attacked the guards' quarters over the hill, killing several more security forces and members of their families. At the height of the riot, some 5,000 prisoners were openly in revolt.

Reinforced from a second camp, guards proceeded to open fire on the rioters with machine guns, the defectors have stated. Reports on the number of dead vary; the defectors claim all rioters were executed, while a third defector previously involved with the North Korean security services describes being told of the execution of only a third. The bodies of the dead prisoners were burned or buried in mass graves in the surrounding hills, while the bodies of the dead guards and their families were buried in the nearby Sawol-ri cemetery.

The camp was closed in 1989, a decision thought to be because of its proximity to the border with China. The prisoners were then transferred to Hoeryong concentration camp.

== See also ==
- Hoeryong concentration camp
- Yodok concentration camp
- Human rights in North Korea
