= Marc Wiese =

German film director

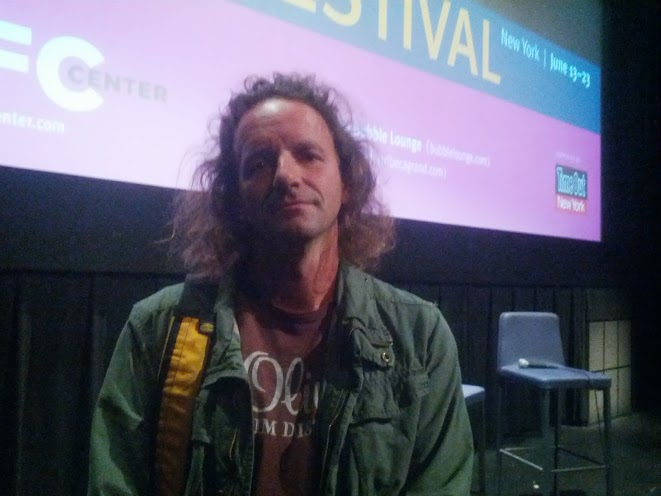
Marc Wiese at the Human Rights Watch Film Festival in New York

Marc Wiese is a Dortmund-born German documentary filmmaker, best known for Camp 14: Total Control Zone, about Shin Dong-hyuk, the only person known to have ever successfully escaped from a North Korean prison labor camp (where he was born), and to breach the borders of North Korea itself to China, arriving eventually in South Korea.

Wiese received an award from the Biarritz International Festival of Audiovisual Programming in 2009 for his television documentary, Kanun: The Law Of Honour.

== Filmography ==
- Kanun: The Law Of Honour (2009)
- Camp 14: Total Control Zone (2012)
- This Stolen Country of Mine (2022)
