= Sangil station =

Railway station in North Korea

Sangil station (Korean: 상일역) is a railway station in Ch'ŏlsan-gu, Tŏksŏng, South Hamgyŏng, North Korea. It is on located on the Tŏksŏng line of the Korean State Railway.
