= Tukchang =

Tŭkchang District 득장지구
- District

Korean transcription(s)
  - Chosŏn'gŭl: 득장지구
  - Hancha: 得將地區
  - McCune–Reischauer: Tŭkchang-jigu
  - Revised Romanization: Deukjang-jigu
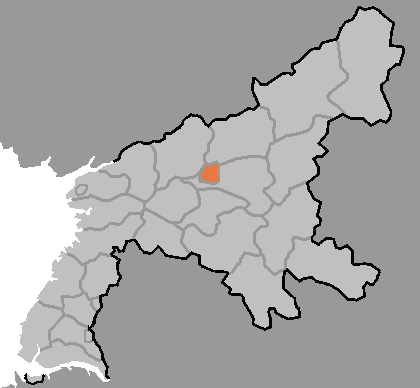
- Country: North Korea
- Province: South P'yŏngan
- Administrative divisions: 4 workers' districts

Population (2008)
  - Total: 50,033

Tŭkchang District is a chigu in South P'yŏngan province, North Korea.

Tŭkchang was established as its own administrative area after separating from Pukch'ang in 1995.

== Administrative districts ==
The district is split into four rodongjagu (workers' districts)in 1995:

- Kalgol-lodongjagu (갈골로동자구/갈골労働者区)
- Tŭkchang-rodongjagu (득장로동자구/得將労働者区)
- Myŏnghang-rodongjagu (명학로동자구/鳴鶴労働者区)
- Poŏp-rodongjagu (보업로동자구/甫業労働者区)

The district is split into nine dong (neighborhoods) in 2008.

== Transportation ==
Tŭkchang district is served by Myŏnghak Station in Myŏnghang-rodongjagu, the terminus of a branchline of the Korean State Railway's P'yŏngdŏk Line.

== Prison Camp ==
Political Prison Camp No. 18 is a large prison labour colony in Tŭkchang district and Pukch'ang County at the banks of Taedong River. In 1995, Camp 18 Tukchang part was returned to ordinary society and is called “Tukchang Coal Mine Complex”(득장지구탄광련합기업소). The camp was dismantled in 2006 and maybe reopened in 2016.
