= Pukchang concentration camp =

North Korean concentration camp

Coordinates: 39°32′46″N 126°03′48″E

- Kwan-li-so No. 18 Pukch'ang
- Chosŏn'gŭl: 북창 제18호 관리소
- Hancha: 北倉第十八號管理所
- Revised Romanization: Bukchang Je 18 ho Gwalliso
- McCune–Reischauer: Pukch'ang Che 18 ho Kwalliso

- Pukch'ang concentration camp
- Hangul: 북창 정치범 수용소
- Hanja: 北倉政治犯收容所
- Revised Romanization: Bukchang Jeongchibeom Suyongso
- McCune–Reischauer: Pukch'ang Chŏngch'ibŏm Suyongso

Location of Pukchang camp in North Korea

Kwan-li-so (Penal-labor colony) No. 18 Pukch'ang (Chosŏn'gŭl: 북창 제18호 관리소), often known outside North Korea as Pukch'ang concentration camp (Hangul: 북창 정치범 수용소; also spelled Bukchang, Dukjang, or Tŭkchang), is a political labor camp in North Korea (kwalliso). It is located in rural Pukchang County in South Pyongan Province, and is around 3 km (1.9 mi) south of the Taedong River, where another political labour camp, No. 14 Kaechon, is located.

== Location ==
The camp is in Pukchang County and Tukchang district, South Pyongan Province in North Korea. It is situated along the middle reaches of the Taedong river, which forms the northern boundary of the camp, and also includes the mountains south of the river. On the other side of the Taedong river is the Kaechon internment camp (Kwan-li-so No. 14).

== Description ==
According to Hwang Jang-yop, the former leader of the Workers’ Party of Korea, Pukchang camp is the oldest North Korean prison camp and was already erected by 1958. Like in Yodok camp there is one section for political prisoners in lifelong detention and another section functioning as a reeducation camp. Possibly these sections were completely separated earlier and therefore are named Pukchang and Tukchang respectively. While all the other political prison camps belong to the State Security Department, Pukchang camp is run by the Interior Ministry. In some cases, political prisoners were deported to the Kaechon camp, while their relatives (parents, children, siblings, grandchildren) were deported to the Pukchang camp. They are classified as politically unreliable and are imprisoned without any lawsuit or conviction solely on the basis of kinship.

The camp is around 73 km^{2} (28 sq mi) in area and is surrounded by a 4-metre-high (13 ft) fence. There are several prison labor colonies with barracks for the prisoners and housing for the guards: the 4th, 5th, and 6th divisions. Family members are often allowed to live together. Around 50,000 prisoners live in Pukchang concentration camp. Kim Yong reported the presence of foreign prisoners (7 old people he asserts to be POWs from the Korean war and a Japanese woman either a repatriate or an abductee ), but there is no other source to confirm this.

== Purpose ==
Pukchang camp isolates people from society who are deemed by the North Korean government to be politically unreliable. It was established to exploit the prisoners with hard and dangerous labor. Within the camp borders, there are at least five coal mines, where all capable prisoners have to work from early in the morning to late in the evening. Furthermore, there is a cement factory and some other factories.

== Human rights situation ==
Kim Hye-sook has described the human rights situation in detail and testified to the Canadian Parliament and the British Parliament. Rules in Pukchang camp seem to be slightly less strict compared to the human rights situation in other political prison camps. Despite this, prisoners are still shot in cases of escape attempts, thefts of food, or violations of instructions. Kim witnessed more than 100 public executions per year with prisoners being tortured and then shot or hanged as a deterrent to the other prisoners.

The most common causes of death are malnutrition, work accidents, and illnesses. Kim reported that in the 1990s her family only received 7 kg (15 lb) of corn per month and occasionally some bean paste (Doenjang), or salt. In order to survive, they had to search for edible plants, leaves, and insects. She saw bodies lying around the camp and reported cases of cannibalism. Since the prisoners have to work 16–18 hours in the mines every day without any protection, after a few years most suffer from pneumoconiosis and many die from it. Kim developed a pulmonary tumor because of the inhaled dust. Work accidents often lead to limb amputations. Many children have frostbite, because they have no shoes and have to go barefoot even in winter.

Kim reported that the prisoners have no human rights and are treated at the guards’ mercy. To humiliate the prisoners, the guards would often force them to get on their knees, and then spit into the prisoner's mouths and make them swallow the spit. If prisoners do not immediately obey, they are savagely beaten. The prisoners are monitored almost continuously by security agents and are urged to spy on each other and to denounce other prisoners.

== Reported closure and re-opening ==
According to some sources, the camp ceased operations in 2006. The satellite images, however, show that the mine inside the camp is still operating with civilian laborers. It is likely that some parts of the camp still hold political prisoners, but most of the former camp area has stopped functioning as a labor camp.

In 2016 it was reported that camp 18 had either been re-opened or merged with camp 14 on the other side of the river. Satellite images showed a new security perimeter and increased activity in the area. There also seemed to be an operational ferry between the two camps, giving the suggestion that the camps may have merged.

== Prisoners (witnesses) ==
- Kim Yong (1996–1998 in Pukchang) was at first imprisoned in Kaechon camp, when his relationship (which he covered up) to his father and brother, who both were executed as alleged US spies, was identified. Later, he was relocated to Pukchang after the intervention of his former boss.
- Kim Hye Sook (1975–2002 in Pukchang) was imprisoned at the age of 13 years, because her grandfather tried to escape to South Korea.

== See also ==
- Human rights in North Korea
- Prisons in North Korea
- Kaechon internment camp
- Yodok concentration camp
