= Blaine Harden =

American journalist and author (born 1952)

Blaine Harden (born 1952) is an American journalist and author. His 2012 book Escape from Camp 14 is an official biography of North Korean defector Shin Dong-hyuk.

== Journalism ==
Harden worked for 28 years for The Washington Post as a correspondent in Africa, Eastern Europe and Asia, as well as in New York and Seattle. Harden worked for 4 years as a local and national correspondent for The New York Times and a writer for the Times Magazine. He has also worked as a reporter for Frontline, The Economist, Foreign Policy, National Geographic and The Guardian.

== Books ==
Harden's debut book was in 1990, called Africa: Dispatches from a Fragile Continent.

His second book was in 1996, titled A River Lost about the damming of the wild Columbia river and its ecological consequences. Harden and his book are featured in the PBS American Experience program titled Grand Coulee Dam, about the Grand Coulee Dam.

His third book came out in 2012 titled Escape from Camp 14. It is an official biography of North Korean defector Shin Dong-hyuk. In January 2015, Harden announced that Shin had admitted to lying about several aspects of his story.

Harden's fourth book The Great Leader and the Fighter Pilot was released in March 2015. It is a dual biography of Kim Il Sung, the founder of North Korea and No Kum-sok, a defector who stole a MiG-15 and landed it in South Korea.

Harden's fifth book King of Spies was released in October 2017. It is a biography of Air Force Major Donald Nichols, an intelligence officer who operated for 11 years in Korea before, during, and after the Korean War.

In 2021, Harden published Murder at the Mission: A Frontier Killing, Its Legacy of Lies, and the Taking of the American West, which examines the Whitman massacre.

== Works ==
- 1990 Africa: Dispatches from a Fragile Continent
- 1996 A River Lost: The Life and Death of the Columbia
- 2012 Escape from Camp 14: One Man's Remarkable Odyssey from North Korea to Freedom in the West
- 2015 The Great Leader and the Fighter Pilot: The True Story of the Tyrant Who Created North Korea and The Young Lieutenant Who Stole His Way to Freedom
- 2017 King of Spies: The Dark Reign of America's Spymaster in Korea
- 2021 Murder at the Mission: A Frontier Killing, Its Legacy of Lies, and the Taking of the American West

== Awards and honors ==
- 1985 Livingston Awards for Young Journalists in International Reporting, for "Notes of a Famine Watcher" (series), The Washington Post.
- 1988 American Society of News Editors Awards for Non-deadline Writing (stories about Africa).
- 1992 National Journalism Awards, Human Interest Writing Ernie Pyle Award, for coverage of the siege of Sarajevo during the Bosnian War.
- 2012 Grand Prix de la Biographie Politique, Escape From Camp 14
- 2013 Dayton Literary Peace Prize, finalist, Escape From Camp 14
