= Myonggan County =

Myonggan County 명간군
- County

Korean transcription(s)
  - Hanja: 明澗郡
  - McCune-Reischauer: Myŏnggan kun
  - Revised Romanization: Myeonggan-gun
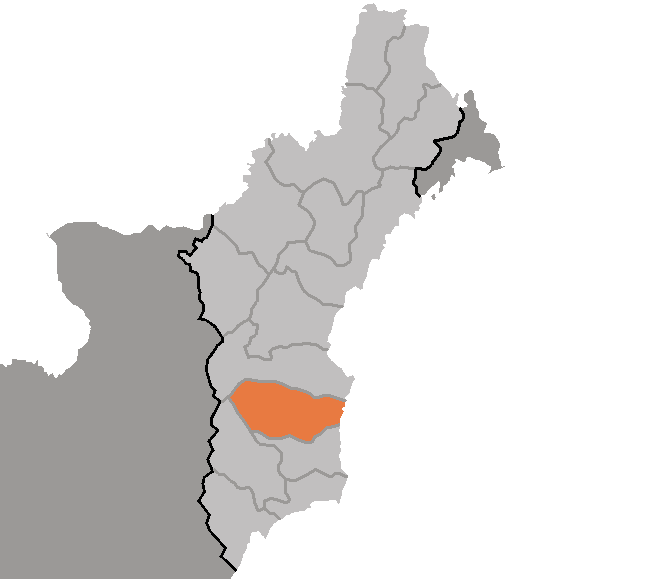
- Map of North Hamgyong showing the location of Myonggan
- Country: North Korea
- Province: North Hamgyong Province
- Administrative divisions: 1 ŭp, 3 labor districts, 22 ri

Area
  - Total: 1,140 km^{2} (440 sq mi)

Population (2008)
  - Total: 99,557
  - Density: 87.3/km^{2} (226/sq mi)

Myŏnggan County, formerly known as Hwasŏng County, is a kun, or county, in North Hamgyong province, North Korea. Unlike many Korean districts that date from the Joseon Dynasty, Hwasong was created after liberation. Yŏngan (Chosŏn'gŭl: 영안군, Hancha: 永安郡) was established in 1952, separated from Myŏngch'ŏn. In 1967 Yŏngan was renamed to Myŏnggan, in 1981 to Hwasŏng (Chosŏn'gŭl: 화성군, Hancha: 化成郡), and in 2004 to Myŏnggan.

Myŏnggan abuts the Sea of Japan (East Sea of Korea). Most of the land is rugged, with only one small plain along the Hwasongchon stream. The highest point in the county is Kiunbong. There are no ports, and the coastline is distinctively monotonous.

The chief streams of the county are the Ŏrangch'ŏn (Chosŏn'gŭl: 어랑천, Hancha: 漁郎川) and Myŏngganch'ŏn (Chosŏn'gŭl: 명간천, Hancha: 明澗川). More than 80% of the county is taken up by forestland.

Myŏnggan is known for its pear orchards. In addition, livestock are widely raised. There are also coal mines in the county.

Political Prison Camp No. 16 is a large prison labor colony in the western part of the county.

== Administrative divisions ==
Myŏnggan County is divided into 1 ŭp (town), 3 rodongjagu (workers' districts) and 22 ri (villages):

- Myŏnggan-ŭp
- Kŭktong-rodongjagu
- Pyongban-rodongjagu
- Ryanghwa-rodongjagu
- Ch'ŏngryong-ri
- Hamji-li
- Hap'yŏng-ri
- Hau-ri
- Hawŏl-li
- Honam-ri
- Hosal-li
- Hwaryong-ri
- Kosŏng-ri
- Kŭndong-ri
- Kwang'am-ri
- Myŏngnam-ri
- Paengrong-ri
- Puam-ri
- Puhwa-ri
- Ripsŏng-ri
- Ryongdong-ri
- Ryongdŏng-ri
- Samp'o-ri
- Sangjang-ri
- Sinyang-ri
- Yangch'ŏl-li
