= Toksong County =

Toksong County 덕성군
- County

Korean transcription(s)
  - Hanja: 德城郡
  - McCune-Reischauer: Tŏksŏng kun
  - Revised Romanization: Deokseong-gun
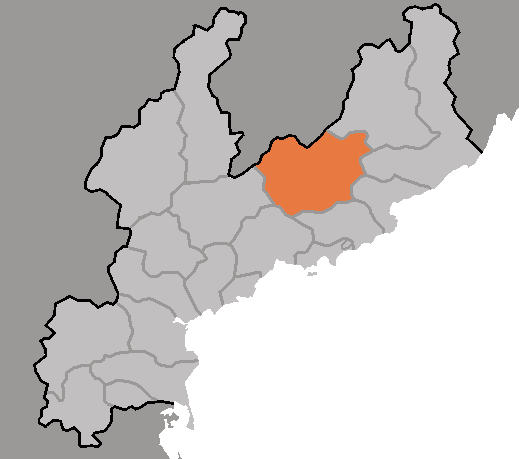
- Map of South Hamgyong showing the location of Toksong
- Country: North Korea
- Province: South Hamgyong Province
- Administrative divisions: 1 ŭp, 1 workers' district, 23 ri

Area
  - Total: 1,573 km^{2} (607 sq mi)

Population (2008)
  - Total: 97,617
  - Density: 62.06/km^{2} (160.7/sq mi)

Tŏksŏng County is a county in South Hamgyŏng province, North Korea.

== Geography ==
It is largely mountainous, but the southern area is low-lying. The Pujŏllyŏng, Taedŏk, and Kŏdubong (거두봉) ranges pass through the county. The highest point is Hŭisabong. Major streams include the Kŏsŏch'ŏn (거서천), Konp'ach'ŏn (곤파천), and Tongp'allyŏngch'ŏn (통팔령천).

Temperatures are typically quite low. About 89% of the county is forestland, of which some 70% is coniferous. Thanks to this, lumbering is an important local industry.

== Administrative divisions ==
Tŏksŏng county is divided into 1 ŭp (town), 1 rodongjagu (workers' districts) and 23 ri (villages):

- Tŏksŏng-ŭp
- Ch'ŏlsal-lodongjagu
- Ch'angsŏng 1-ri
- Ch'angsŏng 2-ri
- Changhŭng-ri
- Chiktong-ri
- Chungdol-li
- Chungdong-ri
- Chuŭidong-ri
- Imjadong-ri
- Indong-ri
- Ŏmdong-ri
- Ŏmsŏ-ri
- Posŏng-ri
- Ragwŏl-li
- Samgi-ri
- Sangdol-li
- Sinhŭng-ri
- Sint'ae-ri
- Songjung-ri
- Susŏ-ri
- Tŏg'udae-ri
- Tongjung-ri
- Yangsŭng-ri
- Wŏlgŭndae-ri

== Economy ==
The local economy is centred on manufacturing, although agriculture also plays a role. Manufacturing accounts for 90% of local production. Local crops include maize, soybeans, and potatoes; these are chiefly grown along the valleys. There are also orchards and silkworm farms. Mining is supported by deposits of iron ore, gold, fluorspar, and magnetite. Hydroelectric power stations can also be found in the county.

== Transportation ==
Tŏksŏng county is served roads and by the Tŏksŏng line of the Korean State Railway.

== See also ==
- Geography of North Korea
- Administrative divisions of North Korea
