= Pukchang County =

Pukch'ang County 북창군
- County

Korean transcription(s)
  - Chosŏn'gŭl: 북창군
  - Hancha: 北倉郡
  - McCune-Reischauer: Pukch'ang-gun
  - Revised Romanization: Bukchang-gun
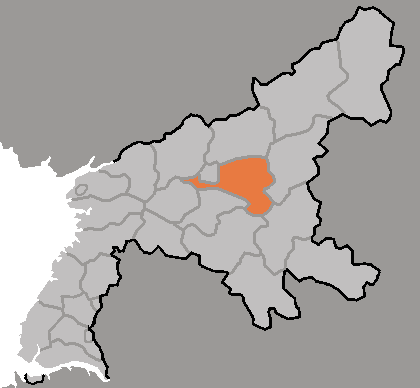
- Map of South Pyongan showing the location of Pukchang
- Country: North Korea
- Province: South P'yŏngan
- Administrative divisions: 1 ŭp, 4 workers' districts, 21 ri

Population (2008)
  - Total: 139,498

Pukch'ang County is a kun (county) in South P'yŏngan province, North Korea.

== History ==
In 1952, Pukchang County was formed from the former area of Maengsan County and Tokchon. Since then, the county has been changed multiple times by merging in or transferring out some areas.

In January 2000, Tukchang district was abolished and transferred to Pukchang County. However, the district reappeared in the 2008 North Korea Census.

== Environment ==
Pukchang County is located in a mountainous area. On the northern border with Tokchon runs the east-west Jangan mountain range. On the southern border with Unsan County, South Pyongan, the Chonsong mountain range also runs east-west. In the west of the county is the Mount Myohyang range. Around 80% of the county is forest.

The Taedong River runs through the county.

== Administrative divisions ==
The district is split into 1 ŭp (town), 4 rodongjagu (worker districts) and 21 ri (villages):

- Pukch'ang-ŭp (북창읍/北倉邑)
- Inp'o-rodongjagu (인포로동자구/仁浦勞動者區)
- Pukch'ang-rodongjagu (북창로동자구/北昌勞動者區)
- P'unggong-rodongjagu (풍곡로동자구/豊谷勞動者區)
- Songnam-rodongjagu (송남로동자구/松南勞動者區)
- Chamsang-ri (잠상리/蠶上里)
- Hwial-ri (회안리/檜安里)
- Kap'yŏng-ri (가평리/加坪里)
- Kwangro-ri (광로리/廣路里)
- Ryongsal-li (룡산리/龍山里)
- Sam-ri (삼리/三里)
- Sangha-ri (상하리/上下里)
- Sinbong-ri (신복리/新福里)
- Sinsŏng-ri (신석리/新石里)
- Soch'ang-ri (소창리/召倉里)
- Sŏksal-li (석산리/石山里)
- Songrim-ri (송림리/松林里)
- Songsa-ri (송사리/松寺里)
- Taep'yŏng-ri (대평리/大坪里)
- Wŏnp'yŏng-ri (원평리/院坪里)
- Yŏllyu-ri (연류리/淵柳里)
- Kwanha-ri (관하리/官下里)
- Maehyŏl-ri (매현리/梅峴里)
- Namsang-ri (남상리/南上里)
- Pongch'ang-ri (봉창리/鳳倉里)
- Suong-ri (수옥리/水玉里)

== Economy ==
Built in the 1960s with Soviet assistance, Pukchang has the power station with the highest generating capacity in North Korea, with the Pukchang Thermal Power Complex having a generation capacity of 1600 MW, reached in December 1984. According to official statistics in 2009, it generated on average 1100 MW throughout the year. Different estimates puts the generating capacity at only 500 MW. The power plant suffered issues due to the low quality fuel oil provided by the USA under the Agreed Framework, which had a high sulfur content and thus would cause significant damage to the boilers. While an apparent replacement power plant with a capacity of 300 MW was being built in Kangdong County starting in 2014 due to aging of Pukchang Thermal Power Complex, the project appears to have stalled. It draws water from the Taedong River.

In December 12, 2018, an extension to the Pukchang Thermal Power Complex was inaugurated, likely as a result of an order of Kim Jong-un, calling for a 'drastic increase in thermal power generation'. According to NKNews sources, various cities had a marked improvement in electricity supply in 2018, although rural areas mostly relied on solar panels. The complex manufactures its own spare parts, such as turbine blades.

The county has a large number of coal mines, producing high quality coal, which supports the thermal power complex. Various other light industry exist in the county along with a number of farms, producing vegetables and raising animals.

The Pukchang Aluminum Factory, North Korea's only aluminum smelting and alloying plant has been condemned for releasing toxic dust over neighboring communities including offices, schools, homes, and businesses. The product of filters unreplaced since its construction in 1983, residents from the nearby community report high rates of birth defects, dermatitis, and respiratory disease contributing to an average life expectancy short of mid-50s. The "Class 1"-designated factory manufactures aluminum for North Korean missiles and centrifuges.

== Transport ==
The Pyongdok Line and Its branches, the Tukchang Line and Taegon Line passes through the county.

Roads connecting Pyongsong and Hamhung, Kumya and Pukchang, Tokchon and Pukchang run through the county.
