= Kaechon internment camp =

Forced labour camp in North Korea

Coordinates: 39°34′16″N 126°03′20″E

- Kwan-li-so No. 14 Kaechon
- Chosŏn'gŭl: 개천 제14호 관리소
- Hancha: 价川第十四號管理所
- Revised Romanization: Gaecheon Je14ho Gwalliso
- McCune–Reischauer: Kaechŏn Che14ho Kwalliso

- Kaechon internment camp
- Hangul: 개천 정치범수용소
- Hanja: 价川政治犯收容所
- Revised Romanization: Gaecheon Jeongchibeom Suyongso
- McCune–Reischauer: Kaechŏn Chŏngch'ibŏm Suyongso

Location of Kaechon camp in North Korea

Kwan-li-so (Penal-labor colony) No. 14 Kaechon (Chosŏn'gŭl: 개천 제14호 관리소), often called outside North Korea as Kaechon internment camp or Camp 14 (Hangul: 개천 정치범수용소, also spelled Kae'chŏn or Gaecheon), is a North Korean political labor camp (kwalliso) in a rural area within the boundaries of Kaechon, South Pyongan Province. It is located around 3 km (1.9 mi) to the north of another political labor camp, Kwan-li-so No. 18 Pukchang. Kaechon sits on the north banks of the Taedong River.

== Description ==
The camp was established around 1959 by Kim Il Sung in rural central North Korea, near the city of Kaechon, South Pyongan Province. It is situated along the middle reaches of the Taedong river, which forms the southern boundary of the camp, and includes the mountains north of the river, including Purok-san. Bukchang, a concentration camp (Kwan-li-so No.18) adjoins the southern banks of the Taedong River. The camp is about 155 km^{2} (60 mi^{2}) in area, with farms, mines, and factories threaded through the steep mountain valleys. The camp includes overcrowded barracks that house males, females, and older children separately, a headquarters with administrative buildings, and guard housing. Altogether around 15,000 are imprisoned in Kaechon internment camp.

== Purpose ==
The main purpose of the Kaechon internment camp is to keep politically unreliable individuals classed "unredeemable" by the North Korean government isolated from society and to exploit their labour. Those sent to the camp include officials perceived to have performed poorly in their job, people who criticize the regime, their children, anyone who was born in the camp, and anyone suspected of engaging in "anti-government" activities. Prisoners have to work in one of the coal mines, in agriculture, or in one of the factories that produce textiles, paper, food, rubber, shoes, ceramics, and cement. Livestock raising is considered the occupation of choice for the prisoners as it gives them the chance to steal animal food and pick through animal droppings for undigested grains.

== Human rights situation ==
Witnesses have reported that prisoners interned in the camp are required to work for long periods, often from 5:30 to midnight. Even 11-year-old children have to work after school and thus rarely see their parents. Other reports describe prisoners being beaten and severely punished for minor infractions.

Food rations are scant, consisting of salted cabbage and corn. The prisoners are emaciated; they lose their teeth, and their gums blacken. Many die of malnourishment, illness, work accidents, and the after-effects of torture. Many prisoners resort to eating frogs, insects, rats, snakes, and even cannibalism in order to try to survive. Eating rat flesh helps prevent pellagra, a common disease in the camp resulting from the absence of protein and niacin in the diet. In order to eat anything outside of the prison-sanctioned meal, including these animals, prisoners must first get permission from the guards.

=== Imprisoned witnesses ===
==== Shin Dong-hyuk ====
In his official biography Escape from Camp 14 by Blaine Harden, Shin Dong-hyuk claimed that he was born in the camp and lived there until escaping in his early twenties. In 2015, Shin recanted some of this story. Shin told Harden that he had changed some dates and locations and incorporated some "fictive elements" into his account. Harden outlined these revisions in a new foreword but did not revise the entire book. Shin said that he did not spend his entire North Korean life at Camp 14. Though maintaining that he was born there, he stated that, when he was young, his family was transferred to the less severe Camp 18, and spent several years there. He said that he was tortured in Camp 14 in 2002, as punishment for escaping from Camp 18.

==== Kim Yong ====
Kim Yong (1995–1996 in Kaechon, then in Bukchang) was imprisoned after it was revealed that the two men who were executed as alleged US spies were his father and brother. He witnessed approximately 25 executions in his section of the camp within less than two years.

== See also ==
- Camp 14: Total Control Zone
- Human rights in North Korea
- Kaechon concentration camp
- Ministry of State Security (North Korea)
- Prisons in North Korea
- Pukchang concentration camp
- Slavery
- Yodok concentration camp
