= Hoeryong concentration camp =

Political prison camp in North Korea

Coordinates: 42°32′17″N 129°56′08″E

- Hangul: 회령 제22호 관리소
- Hanja: 會寧第二十二號管理所
- RR: Hoeryeong je22ho gwalliso
- MR: Hoeryŏng che22ho kwalliso

Alternate name
- Hangul: 회령 정치범 수용소
- Hanja: 會寧政治犯收容所
- RR: Hoeryeong jeongchibeom suyongso
- MR: Hoeryŏng chŏngch'ibŏm suyongso

Hoeryong concentration camp (Haengyong concentration camp or Camp 22) was a concentration and death camp in North Korea that was reported to have been closed in 2012. The official name was Kwalliso (penal labour colony) No. 22. The camp was a maximum security area, completely isolated from the outside world.

In 2012, satellite image analysis and reports indicated major changes including its reported closure.

== Location ==
Location of Camp 22 in North Korea

Camp 22 was located in Hoeryong County, North Hamgyong province, in northeast North Korea, near the border with China. It was situated in a large valley with many side valleys, surrounded by 400–700 m (1,300–2,300 ft) high mountains. The southwest gate of the camp was located around 7 km (4.3 mi) northeast of downtown Hoeryong, while the main gate was located around 15 km (9.3 mi) southeast of Kaishantun in China's Jilin province. The western boundary of the camp runs parallel to, and at a distance of 5–8 km (3.1–5.0 mi) from, the Tumen River, which forms the border with China. The camp was not included in maps until recently and the North Korean government has always denied its existence.

== History ==
The camp was founded around 1965 by Kim Il Sung and his son Kim Jong Il in Haengyong-ri and expanded into the areas of Chungbong-ri and Sawul-ri in the 1980s and 1990s. The number of prisoners increased sharply in the 1990s when three other prison camps in North Hamgyong province were closed and the prisoners were transferred to Camp 22. Kwan-li-so No. 11 (Kyongsong) was closed in 1989, Kwan-li-so No. 12 (Onsong) was closed in 1992 and Kwan-li-so No. 13 (Changpyong) in 1992.

== Description ==
Camp 22 was around 225 km^{2} (87 mi^{2}) in area. It was surrounded by an inner 3300 volt electric fence and an outer barbed wire fence, with traps and hidden nails between the two fences. The camp was controlled by roughly 1,000 guards and 500–600 administrative agents. The guards were equipped with automatic rifles, machine guns, hand grenades, clubs, whips, and trained dogs.

In the 1990s, there were an estimated 50,000 prisoners in the camp. Prisoners were mostly people who criticized the government, people deemed politically unreliable (such as South Korean prisoners of war, Christians, returnees from Japan) or purged senior party members. Based on the guilt-by-association principle (연좌제; yeonjwaje) they are often imprisoned together with the whole family including children and the elderly, and including any children born in the camp. All prisoners were detained until they died; they were never released.

The camp was divided into several prison labour colonies:

- Haengyong-ri was the camp headquarters with administration offices, a food factory, a garment factory, detention center, guards' quarters, and prisoner family quarters.
- Chungbong-ri was a mining section with a coal mine, loading depot, railway station, hospital, guards' quarters, and single prisoners' quarters.
- Naksaeng-ri, Sawul-ri, Kulsan-ri, and Namsok-ri were farming sections with prisoner family quarters.

There was an execution site in Sugol Valley, at the edge of the camp.

== Conditions in the camp ==
Former guard Ahn Myong-chol describes the conditions in the camp as harsh and life-threatening. He recalls the shock he felt upon his first arrival at the camp, where he likened the prisoners to walking skeletons, dwarfs, and cripples in rags. Ahn estimates that about 30% of the prisoners had deformities, such as torn off ears, smashed eyes, crooked noses, and faces covered with cuts and scars resulting from beatings and other mistreatment. Around 2,000 prisoners, he says, had missing limbs, but even prisoners who needed crutches to walk were still forced to work.

Prisoners received 180 g (6.3 oz) of corn per meal (two times a day), with almost no vegetables and no meat. The only meat in their diets was from rats, snakes, frogs, or even insects that they caught. Ahn estimated that 1,500–2,000 people died of malnutrition there every year, mostly children. Despite these deaths, the inmate population remained constant, suggesting that similar numbers of new inmates arrived each year.

Children received only very basic education. From the age of 6 onward they were assigned work, such as picking vegetables, peeling corn, or drying rice, but received very little food — only 360 g (13 oz) in all per day. Consequently, many children died before the age of ten years. Elderly prisoners had the same work requirements as other adults. Seriously ill prisoners were quarantined, abandoned, and left to die.

Single prisoners lived in bunkhouses with 100 people in one room. As a reward for good work, families were often allowed to live together in a single room inside a small house, without running water. Houses were in poor condition; walls were made from mud and typically had many cracks. All prisoners were allowed access only to dirty and crowded communal toilets.

Prisoners had to do hard physical labor in agriculture, mining, and inside factories from 5:00 a.m. to 8:00 p.m. (7:00 p.m. in winter), followed by ideological re-education and self-criticism sessions. New Year's Day was the only holiday for prisoners. The mines were not equipped with safety measures and, according to Ahn, prisoners were consequently killed almost every day. Prisoners could use only primitive tools such as shovels and picks and were forced to work to exhaustion. If a fire occurred or a tunnel collapsed, prisoners were simply abandoned inside and left to die. Kwon Hyuk, a former security officer in Camp 22, reported that corpses were loaded into cargo coaches together with the coal, to be burnt in a melting furnace. The coal was delivered to the Chongjin power plant as well as to Chongjin and Kimchaek steel mills, while the food was delivered to the State Security Agency or sold in Pyongyang and other parts of the country.

== Human rights violations ==
Ahn explained how the camp guards are taught that prisoners are factionalists and class enemies that have to be destroyed like weeds down to their roots. They are instructed to regard the prisoners as slaves and not treat them as human beings. Based on this, the guards may at any time kill any prisoner who does not obey their orders. Kwon reported that as a security officer he could decide whether or not to kill a prisoner if they violated a rule. He admitted that once he ordered the execution of 31 people from five families in a collective punishment, because one member of a family tried to escape.

In the 1980s, public executions took place approximately once a week according to Kwon. Ahn reported that in the 1990s they were replaced by secret executions, as the security guards feared riots from the assembled crowd. Kwon was required to visit the secret execution site a number of times; there, he saw disfigured and crushed bodies.

In case of serious violations of camp rules, the prisoners are subjected to a process of investigation, which produced human rights violations such as reduced meals, torture, beating, and sexual harassment. In addition, there is a detention center; many prisoners die in detention and even more leave the detention building crippled.

Ahn and Kwon reported about the following torture methods used in Haengyong-ri:

- Water torture: The prisoner must stand on his or her toes in a tank filled with water to his or her nose for 24 hours.
- Hanging torture: The prisoner is stripped and hung upside down from the ceiling to be violently beaten.
- Box room torture: The prisoner is detained in a very small solitary cell, in which there is barely enough room to sit, but not stand or lie, for three days or a week.
- Kneeling torture: The prisoner must kneel down with a wooden bar inserted near his or her knee hollows to stop blood circulation. After a week, the prisoner cannot walk and may likely die some months later.
- Pigeon torture: The prisoner is tied to the wall with both hands at a height of 60 cm (2.0 ft) and must crouch for many hours.

Prisoners are beaten every day, if, for example, they do not bow quickly or deeply enough before the guards, if they do not work hard enough, or do not obey quickly enough. It is a frequent practice for guards to use prisoners as martial arts targets. Rape and sexual violence are very common in the camp, as female prisoners know they may be easily killed if they resist the demands of the security officers.

Ahn reported about hundreds of prisoners each year being taken away for several "major construction projects", such as secret tunnels, military bases, or nuclear facilities in remote areas. None of these prisoners ever returned to the camp. Ahn is convinced that they were secretly killed after finishing the construction work to keep the secrecy of these projects.

== Human experimentation ==
Kwon reported about human experimentation carried out in Haengyong-ri. He described a sealed glass chamber, 3.5 m (11 ft) wide, 3 m (9.8 ft) long and 2.2 m (7.2 ft) high, where he witnessed a family with two children dying from being test subjects for an asphyxiant gas. Ahn explained how inexperienced medical officers of Chungbong-ri hospital practiced their surgery techniques on prisoners. He heard numerous accounts of unnecessary operations and medical flaws, killing or permanently crippling prisoners.

== Reports on mass starvation and closure ==
Satellite images from late 2012 showed the detention centre and some of the guard towers being razed, but all other structures appeared operational. It was reported that 27,000 prisoners died of starvation within a short time and the surviving 3,000 prisoners were relocated to Hwasong concentration camp between March and June 2012. It was further reported that the camp was shut down in June, security guards removed traces of detention facilities until August and then miners from Kungsim mine and farmers from Saebyol and Undok were moved into the area. According to another report the authorities decided to close the camp to cover its tracks after a warden defected.

== See also ==
- Kaechon internment camp
- Yodok concentration camp
- Kwalliso
- Prisons in North Korea
- Human rights in North Korea
- Extermination through labour
