= Committee for Human Rights in North Korea =

U.S. non-governmental organization

- Founded: October 2001
- Type: Non-profit; NGO
- Location: Washington, D.C.
- Key people: Jack David (Co-Chair, Board of Directors); Katrina Lantos Swett (Co-Chair, Board of Directors); Greg Scarlatoiu (President & CEO)
- Website: www.hrnk.org
- Formerly called: U.S. Committee for Human Rights in North Korea

The Committee for Human Rights in North Korea (HRNK) is a Washington, D.C.-based non-governmental research organization founded in 2001. It investigates and raises awareness of human rights abuses in North Korea.

HRNK produces in-depth research reports on North Korea’s human rights conditions. Its publications have documented the country’s network of political prison camps through the combined use of satellite imagery and survivor testimony, examined other internal dynamics, and investigated international dimensions such as abductions, illicit activities, terrorism links, and the use of forced labor abroad.

HRNK’s research has been cited by international bodies and governments in their assessments of human rights in North Korea. Reports documenting political prison camps were referenced by the United Nations Commission of Inquiry in its 2014 findings on crimes against humanity, and the U.S. State Department has drawn on HRNK publications in its annual human rights reporting. HRNK’s analyses have also informed policy discussions on sanctions and forced labor, with its work noted in U.S. government guidance on North Korean overseas workers and in debates over targeted measures against the regime. The organization's experts have also provided testimony before U.S. congressional hearings.

== Mission ==
HRNK’s mission is to document and raise international awareness of human rights conditions in North Korea, going beyond the broader mandates of larger human rights organizations by focusing exclusively on the DPRK.

According to its leadership, HRNK pursues seven guiding objectives: to close North Korea’s political prison camps, open the country’s borders, inform its citizens, foster sound economic principles, promote outside access, feed the hungry, and link development assistance to human rights improvements. Since its establishment, HRNK has published more than sixty reports and coordinated research with defectors, scholars, and policy experts.

HRNK has been described as a bridge-building organization with members from both liberal and conservative backgrounds, providing a bipartisan platform for research and advocacy on North Korea. Commentators have compared its in-depth reporting with the work of larger groups such as Amnesty International, noting HRNK’s focus on satellite analysis and survivor testimony as a distinguishing feature. The organization’s reports have been recognized as contributing to the evidentiary record of crimes against humanity in the DPRK and informing both scholarship and policy.

== History ==
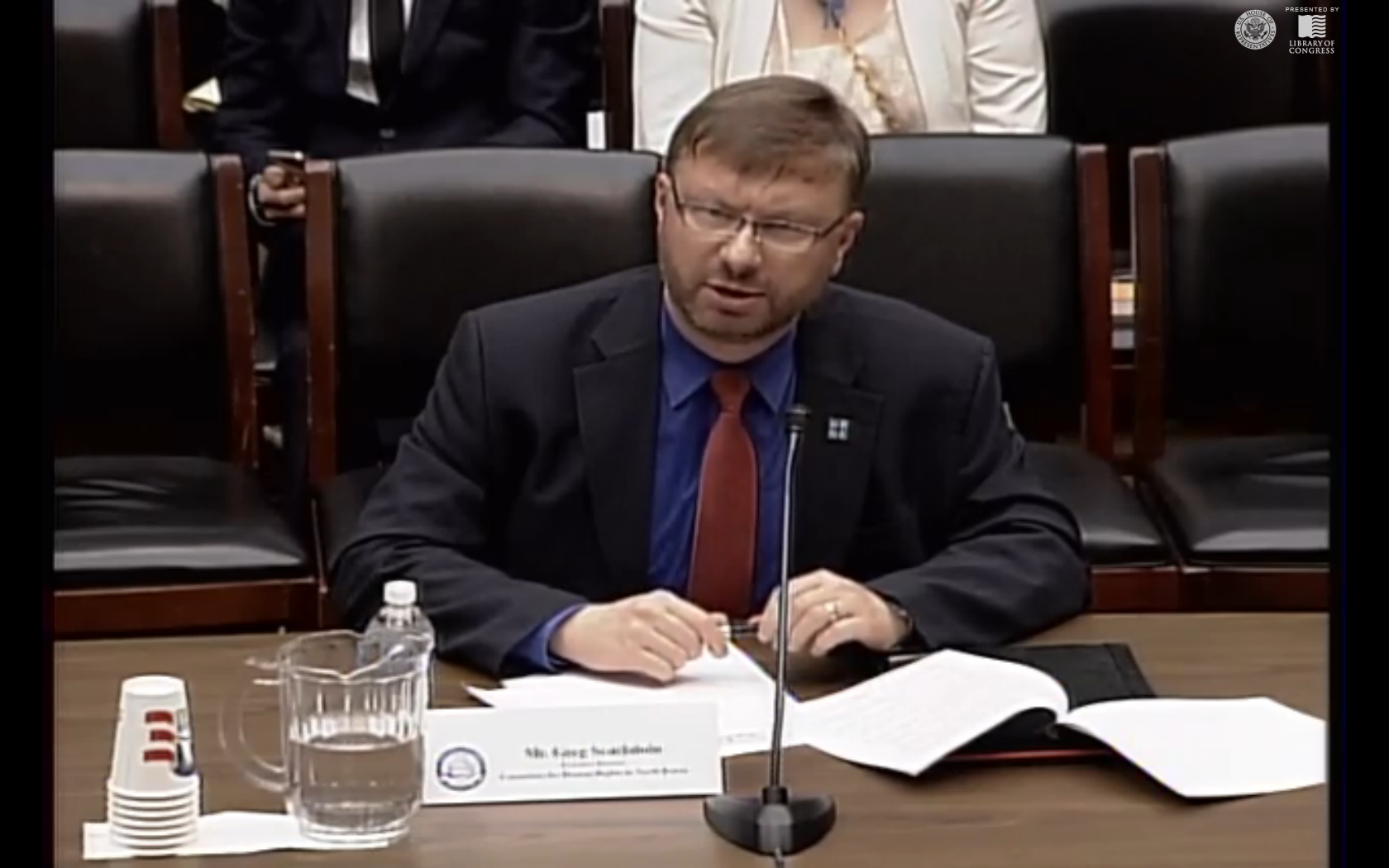
Executive Director Greg Scarlatoiu, giving testimony in April 2015, at the U.S. Congress' Tom Lantos Human Rights Commission, on the topic "North Korea's Forced Labor Enterprise: A State-Sponsored Marketplace in Human Trafficking".

HRNK was founded in 2001 as nonprofit based in Washington D.C. by a group of foreign policy and human rights specialists to fill a gap in non-governmental expertise on North Korea. Well-established organizations such as Amnesty International initially found it difficult to incorporate North Korea, about which information was often scarce, into their models of research and advocacy.

In 2003 HRNK released the first edition of The Hidden Gulag by David Hawk, the first comprehensive study of North Korea's prison camp system, which combined defector testimony with satellite imagery to document facilities the government denied existed.

Chuck Downs, a former Pentagon officer focused on North Korea, played a leading role in the early years. Since 2011 HRNK has been directed by Greg Scarlatoiu.

In 2012, HRNK as part of a group of a coalition of nonprofits, called for a more in-depth United Nations-led investigation into human rights conditions in the DPRK. The following year, the UN Human Rights Council established the Commission of Inquiry on Human Rights in the DPRK. HRNK contributed evidence and analysis to the Commission, whose 2014 report concluded that crimes against humanity had been committed in the country. In 2015, HRNK presented Service Awards to the three UN COI leaders.

=== Memberships and coalitions ===
HRNK is a member of the International Coalition to Stop Crimes Against Humanity in North Korea (ICNK), a global network of NGOs and survivor groups advocating accountability for abuses.

in 2018, after an extended process marked by opposition from some UN member states, HRNK was granted consultative status with the United Nations Economic and Social Council (ECOSOC), enabling it to participate in UN forums.

HRNK’s application for consultative status at the United Nations was for years repeatedly deferred by the UN Committee on Non-Governmental Organizations before finally being approved. During the review process, member states including Russia and China questioned HRNK’s independence, sources of funding, and asked whether it had acknowledged North Korea’s reported successes in areas such as education and healthcare. The DPRK’s UN mission welcomed the initial rejection of HRNK’s application, describing it as “due punishment” and characterizing the organization’s work as part of a U.S. “human rights racket” against North Korea.

== Activities ==
=== Research ===
HRNK is known for its research reports, particularly those documenting North Korea’s prison camps by combining satellite imagery with defector testimony. Its publications have also examined the country’s political system, social controls, the songbun social classification system, abductions of foreign nationals, state-linked illicit activities and terrorism, restrictions on access to information, famine, and gender-based repression.

=== Government engagement ===
HRNK has engaged directly with U.S., European, and UN policymakers to promote accountability for abuses in North Korea. It has been among the NGOs advocating continued U.S. participation in the UN Human Rights Council and highlighting DPRK abuses in international forums. Its findings have been used by officials in shaping policy discussions on sanctions, human rights, and refugee protection, and are cited in the U.S. State Department’s annual Country Reports on Human Rights Practices.

==== U.S. Congressional testimony ====
Experts from the Committee for Human Rights in North Korea have been invited to provide expert testimony before U.S. congressional hearings on the situation of defectors in China, the operation of political prison camps, crimes against humanity, forced labor abroad, and the relationship between human rights and security concerns on the Korean Peninsula. Testimony has been delivered among others by HRNK executive director Greg Scarlatoiu, chair Roberta Cohen, co-chair Andrew Natsios, and founding member Nicholas Eberstadt. Their statements have also emphasized the humanitarian consequences of DPRK policies, the importance of information access, and the need for legislative and international action.

=== Work with international bodies ===
HRNK contributed evidence and expertise to the United Nations Commission of Inquiry on Human Rights in the DPRK, whose 2014 report concluded that crimes against humanity had been committed in the DPRK. The organization also partnered with the International Bar Association’s War Crimes Committee to conduct the Inquiry on Crimes Against Humanity in North Korean Detention Centers, which held hearings and gathered testimony to explore legal avenues for accountability.

Since 2018, HRNK has held consultative status with the United Nations Economic and Social Council (ECOSOC). This designation allows non-governmental organizations to participate in UN processes, including attending meetings, submitting written statements, and delivering oral interventions at the Human Rights Council and other bodies. NGOs with consultative status may also organize side events, circulate documentation, and provide expert analysis to member states and UN agencies.

=== Conferences and events ===
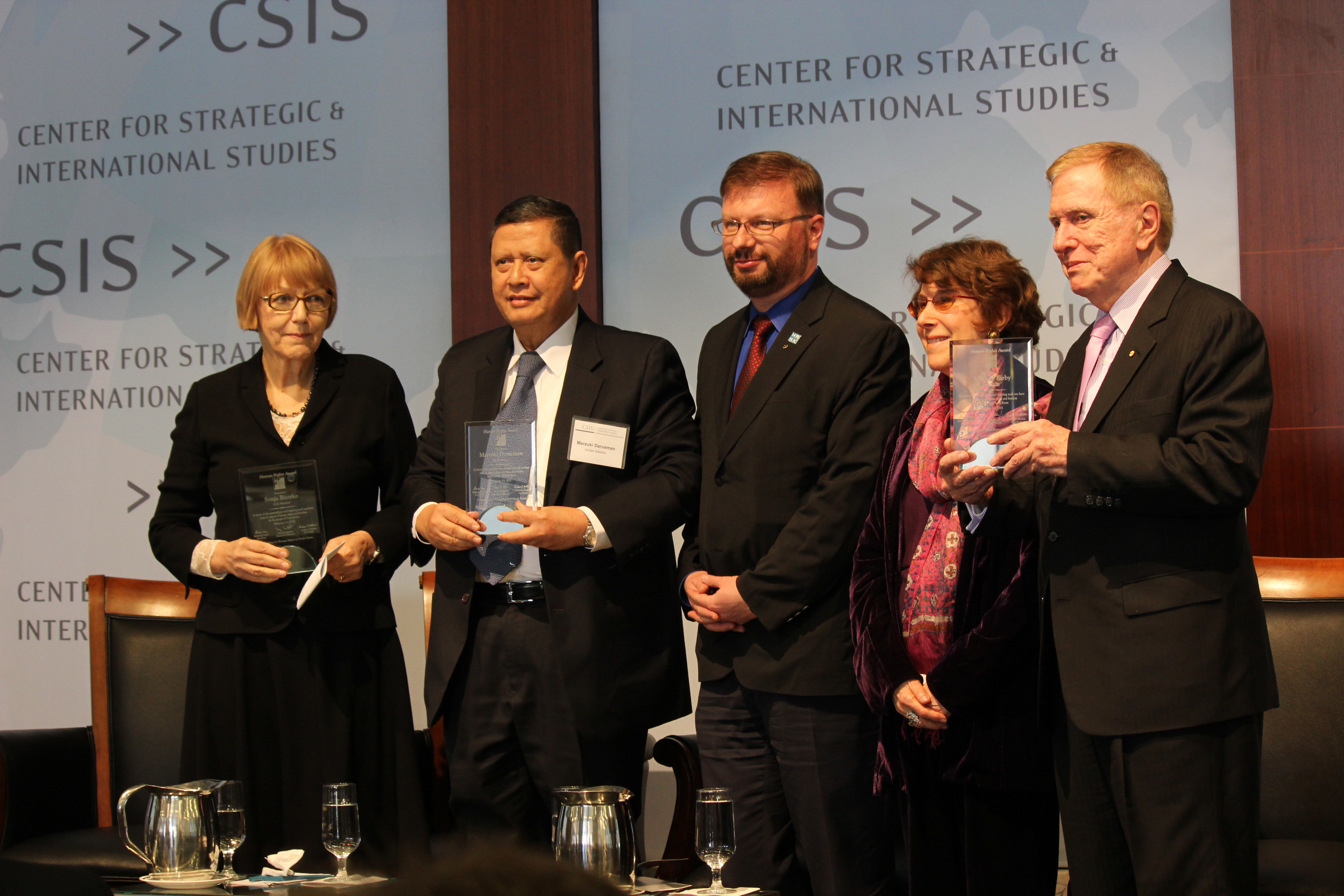
The three commissioners of the United Nations Commission of inquiry on human rights in the DPRK, receive the first Human Rights Award given by HRNK. The image shows commissioners Sonja Biserko, Marzuki Darusman, and Michael Kirby being presented the award by the organization's Co-Chair Roberta Cohen and Executive Director Greg Scarlatoiu.

HRNK has convened and participated in events in the United States and Europe. These events have addressed North Korea’s political prison camps, abductions of foreign nationals, the country’s social classification system (songbun), the humanitarian consequences of famine, and the relationship between human rights and nuclear policy. HRNK has also hosted discussions with members of the UN Commission of Inquiry on Human Rights in North Korea to consider its findings on crimes against humanity, and some of its programs have included testimony from North Korean defectors. In organizing conferneces, panel discussions, and other public events, it has partnered with institutions including the Center for Strategic and International Studies, the Brookings Institution, and Yonsei University.

== Publications ==
Since 2003, HRNK has published a series of reports that document different aspects of life and governance in North Korea. These include detailed studies of the country’s political prison camps (Kwalliso) and re-education centers (kyohwaso), analyses of the songbun social classification system, research on abductions of foreign nationals, and examinations of state-sponsored illicit activities such as drug production and proliferation networks. Other publications have addressed the impact of famine and mismanagement on children’s health, the operation of local governance and social control mechanisms, and the regime’s strategies for restricting access to outside information in the digital age. HRNK has also contributed reports on the relationship between North Korea’s human rights record and international security, including studies of terrorism, forced labor abroad, and accountability under international law. HRNK has released over 60 reports (as of 2025).

=== Prison camps ===
Among HRNK’s most notable works are those focused on the DPRK’s political prison camps and gulag system. David Hawk’s The Hidden Gulag (2003, updated 2012) was the first comprehensive study to confirm the location and operation of these camps, combining defector accounts, hand-drawn maps, and satellite imagery. Later reports such as Gulag, Inc. (2016) and The Parallel Gulag (2017) revealed how forced labor in mining, agriculture, and manufacturing formed part of the regime’s economic strategy, while confirming that conditions of malnutrition, overwork, and brutality persisted despite international scrutiny. HRNK’s camp-specific studies, including analyses of Kaechon, Jongori, and Camp 25, offered detailed evidence of prisoner populations, industrial facilities, and attempts by the authorities to camouflage camp activity.

HRNK’s methodological approach has centered on the integration of satellite imagery with defector and survivor testimony, a combination that has allowed researchers to document facilities and practices that the North Korean government continues to deny. Partnerships with commercial imagery providers such as AllSource Analysis, Airbus, and DigitalGlobe have enabled the organization to produce landmark reports that visually confirmed the location, expansion, and concealment of prison camps. Testimonies collected from escapees further corroborated evidence of starvation, torture, forced labor, and executions, while satellite imagery has revealed camp closures near the Chinese border, the expansion of inland facilities, and the use of camouflage and deception to mask operations.

Prison camp reports are presented here by camp number in ascending order. All other reports are sorted in chronological ascending order.

==== General reports ====
Cover of the 2012 edition of The Hidden Gulag - The Lives and Voices of 'Those Who are Sent to the Mountains'

- Hawk, David (2003), The Hidden Gulag, First Edition – Exposing North Korea's Prison Camps (PDF), LCCN 2004398171, OCLC 54084867, archived (PDF) from the original on 2013-03-14
- Hawk, David (2012), The Hidden Gulag Second Edition – The Lives and Voices of "Those Who are Sent to the Mountains" (PDF), U.S. Committee for Human Rights in North Korea, ISBN 9780615623672, LCCN 2012939299, OCLC 823345587, archived (PDF) from the original on 2012-10-21
- Hawk, David (2013), North Korea's Hidden Gulag – Interpreting Reports of Changes in the Prison Camps (PDF), OCLC 925483619, archived (PDF) from the original on 2014-02-22
- Hawk, David (2015), The Hidden Gulag IV – Gender Repression and Prisoner Disappearances (PDF), U.S. Committee for Human Rights in North Korea, ISBN 9780985648046, LCCN 2015947712, OCLC 953211804, archived (PDF) from the original on 2015-10-06
- Hawk, David; Mortwedt Oh, Amanda (2017), The Parallel Gulag – North Korea's "An-Jeon-Bu" Prison Camps (PDF), Committee for Human Rights in North Korea, ISBN 978-0-9995358-0-6, LCCN 2017957916, OCLC 1028009647, archived (PDF) from the original on 2017-10-26
- Collins, Robert; Mortwedt Oh, Amanda (2017), From Cradle to Grave – The Path of North Korean Innocents (PDF), Committee for Human Rights in North Korea, ISBN 978-0-9995358-1-3, LCCN 2017959301, OCLC 1048601426, archived (PDF) from the original on 2018-02-18
- War Crimes Committee of the International Bar Association; HRNK (2022), Report – Inquiry on Crimes Against Humanity in North Korean Detention Centers (PDF), archived (PDF) from the original on 2024-06-25

==== Kwan-li-so ====
According to HRNK the kwan-li-so (관리소) are political prison camps, also referred to as “total control zones.” HRNK explains that these camps are administered by the Ministry of State Security and used to confine individuals identified as disloyal to the regime, frequently together with their families, often for life without the possibility of release. HRNK has documented that conditions in these facilities include forced labor, chronic food shortages, and systematic abuse, and has reported that crimes against humanity are committed within them.

- Bermudez Jr., Joseph S.; Dinville, Andy; Eley, Mike (2015), North Korea – Imagery Analysis of Camp 14 (PDF), OCLC 1154002767, archived (PDF) from the original on 2016-03-28
- Bermudez Jr., Joseph S.; Scarlatoiu, Greg; Mortwedt Oh, Amanda (2021), North Korea's Political Prison Camp, Kwan-li-so No. 14, Update 1 (PDF), archived (PDF) from the original on 2024-06-25
- Bermudez Jr., Joseph S.; Dinville, Andy; Eley, Mike (2015), North Korea – Imagery Analysis of Camp 15 (PDF), OCLC 1152308041, archived (PDF) from the original on 2015-06-07
- Bermudez Jr., Joseph S.; Dinville, Andy; Eley, Mike (2015), Imagery Analysis of Camp 15 "Yodŏk" – Closure of the "Revolutionizing Zone" (PDF), OCLC 1152293922, archived (PDF) from the original on 2015-10-07
- Bermudez Jr., Joseph S.; Dinville, Andy; Eley, Mike (2015), North Korea – Imagery Analysis of Camp 16 (PDF), OCLC 1154003745, archived (PDF) from the original on 2015-12-16
- Bogle, Jared; Scarlatoiu, Greg; Ha, Raymond (2023), Switchback – Evidence of a Connection between Kwan-li-so No. 16 and the Punggye-ri Nuclear Test Facility? (PDF), archived (PDF) from the original on 2024-06-06
- Bermudez Jr., Joseph S.; Scarlatoiu, Greg; Ha, Raymond (2024), North Korea's Political Prison Camp, Kwan-li-so No. 18 (Pukch'ang) (PDF), archived (PDF) from the original on 2024-07-10
- Bermudez Jr., Joseph S.; Opperman, Amy; Amen, Katelyn (2012), North Korea's Camp No. 22 (PDF), OCLC 1152289727, archived (PDF) from the original on 2014-08-13
- Bermudez Jr., Joseph S.; Dinville, Andy; Amen, Katelyn (2012), North Korea's Camp No. 22 – Update (PDF), OCLC 1152228609, archived (PDF) from the original on 2013-01-17
- Bermudez Jr., Joseph S.; Farfour, Micah; Amen, Katelyn (2013), North Korea's Camp No. 25 (PDF), OCLC 1152322918, archived (PDF) from the original on 2013-07-04
- Bermudez Jr., Joseph S. (2014), North Korea's Camp No. 25 – Update (PDF), OCLC 1152312049, archived (PDF) from the original on 2014-11-22
- Bermudez Jr., Joseph S.; Dinville, Andy; Eley, Mike (2016), North Korea Camp No. 25 Update 2 (PDF), OCLC 1152261987, archived (PDF) from the original on 2016-12-13
- Bermudez Jr., Joseph S.; Scarlatoiu, Greg; Mortwedt Oh, Amanda; Tokola, Rosa (2021), North Korea's Political Prison Camp, Kwan-li-so No. 25, Update 3 (PDF), archived (PDF) from the original on 2021-10-06
- Bermudez Jr., Joseph S.; Scarlatoiu, Greg; Ha, Raymond (2024), North Korea's Political Prison Camp Kwan-li-so No. 25, Update 4 (PDF), archived (PDF) from the original on 2024-05-17

==== Kyo-hwa-so ====
HRNK identifies the kyo-hwa-so (교화소) as correctional or “re-education” centers that detain persons convicted of criminal, rather than political, offenses. These facilities are generally operated by the Ministry of People’s Security (also translated as the Ministry of Public Security). HRNK reports that despite their official designation, conditions in the kyo-hwa-so are extremely harsh, involving forced labor in industries such as mining, farming, and manufacturing, combined with inadequate food and medical care that contribute to high rates of death among prisoners.

- Bermudez Jr., Joseph S.; Scarlatoiu, Greg; Mortwedt Oh, Amanda; Park, Rosa (2020), North Korea's Long-term Prison-Labor Facility Kyo-hwa-so No. 1, Kaech'ŏn (PDF), OCLC 1152307032, archived (PDF) from the original on 2021-09-03
- Bermudez Jr., Joseph S.; Scarlatoiu, Greg; Mortwedt Oh, Amanda; Tokola, Rosa (2021), North Korea's Long-term Prison-Labor Facility, Kyo-hwa-so No.3, T'osŏng-ni (토성리) (PDF), archived (PDF) from the original on 2022-01-22
- Bermudez Jr., Joseph S.; Scarlatoiu, Greg; Mortwedt Oh, Amanda; Park, Rosa (2019), North Korea's Long-term Re-education through Labor Camp (Kyo-hwa-so) No. 4 at Kangdong (PDF), OCLC 1152224817, archived (PDF) from the original on 2019-08-24
- Bermudez Jr., Joseph S.; Scarlatoiu, Greg; Mortwedt Oh, Amanda; Park, Rosa (2019), North Korea's Long-term Re-education through Labor Camp (Kyo-hwa-so) at Pokchŏng-ni [later considered Kyo-hwa-so No. 8] (PDF), OCLC 1152285939, archived (PDF) from the original on 2021-09-03
- Bermudez Jr., Joseph S.; Scarlatoiu, Greg; Mortwedt Oh, Amanda; Park, Rosa (2021), North Korea's Long-term Prison-Labor Facility Kyo-hwa-so No. 8, Sŭngho-ri (승호리) – Update (PDF), archived (PDF) from the original on 2022-01-22
- Bermudez Jr., Joseph S.; Scarlatoiu, Greg; Mortwedt Oh, Amanda; Park, Rosa (2020), North Korea's Chŭngsan No. 11 Detention Facility (PDF), archived (PDF) from the original on 2020-12-21
- Bermudez Jr., Joseph S.; Eley, Mike (2016), North Korea – Kyo-hwa-so No. 12, Jongo-ri (PDF), OCLC 1152223376, archived (PDF) from the original on 2016-09-09
- Bermudez Jr., Joseph S.; Scarlatoiu, Greg (2016), North Korea – Flooding at Kyo-hwa-so No. 12, Jŏngŏ-ri (PDF), OCLC 1152260659, archived (PDF) from the original on 2017-05-09
- Bermudez Jr., Joseph S.; Scarlatoiu, Greg; Mortwedt Oh, Amanda; Park, Rosa (2020), North Korea's Long-term Prison-Labor Facility Kyo-hwa-so No. 12, Jŏngŏ-ri – Update 3 (PDF), archived (PDF) from the original on 2022-01-22

==== Other detention facilities ====
- Bermudez Jr., Joseph S.; Dinville, Andy; Eley, Mike (2016), North Korea – Ch'oma-bong Restricted Area (PDF), OCLC 1153998324, archived (PDF) from the original on 2016-05-07
- Bermudez Jr., Joseph S.; Scarlatoiu, Greg; Mortwedt Oh, Amanda; Park, Rosa (2021), North Korea's Potential Long-Term Prison-Labor Facility at Sŏnhwa-dong (선화동) (PDF), archived (PDF) from the original on 2022-01-22

=== North Korean state and society ===
Beyond the prison camp system, HRNK has also produced major reports on wider aspects of North Korean governance and repression inside the country. Robert Collins’s Marked for Life (2012) examined the songbun social classification system as a form of institutionalized discrimination. Lost Generation (2019) focused on the long-term health consequences for children of famine and state policy failures during the 1990s and beyond, documenting how the famine years left a “lost generation” of North Korean children suffering from stunting, wasting, and chronic trauma. These reports highlight how HRNK’s research has broadened beyond prisons to address the structural systems of discrimination, repression, and neglect that shape everyday life in North Korea.

- Haggard, Stephan; Noland, Marcus (2005), Hunger and Human Rights – The Politics of Famine in North Korea (PDF), ISBN 0-9771-1110-5, LCCN 2005931434, OCLC 647638199, archived (PDF) from the original on 2013-03-22
- Kwang-jin, Kim (2009), After Kim Jong II – Can We Hope for Better Human Rights Protection? (PDF), archived (PDF) from the original on 2013-02-03
- Kwang-jin, Kim (2011), North Korea after Kim Jong-il – Can We Hope for Change? (PDF), archived (PDF) from the original on 2013-02-03
- Collins, Robert (2012), Marked for Life – Songbun, North Korea's Social Classification System (PDF), Committee for Human Rights in North Korea, ISBN 9780985648008, LCCN 2012940892, OCLC 830708805, archived (PDF) from the original on 2012-10-30
- Gause, Ken E. (2012), Coercion, Control, Surveillance, and Punishment – An Examination of the North Korean Police State (PDF), Committee for Human Rights in North Korea, ISBN 9780985648015, LCCN 2012943393, OCLC 830706313, archived (PDF) from the original on 2012-08-13
- Gause, Ken E. (2013), Updated – The North Korea Police State – Second Edition (PDF), LCCN 2012943393, OCLC 1314898419, archived (PDF) from the original on 2013-09-18
- Chestnut Greitens, Sheena (2014), Illicit – North Korea's Evolving Operations to Earn Hard Currency (PDF), OCLC 1005847281, archived (PDF) from the original on 2014-09-04
- Scarlatoiu, Greg; Bermudez Jr., Joseph S. (2015), Unusual Activity at the Kanggon Military Training Area in North Korea – Evidence of Execution by Anti-aircraft Machine Guns? (PDF), archived (PDF) from the original on 2015-05-12
- Gause, Ken E. (2015), North Korean House of Cards – Leadership Dynamics Under Kim Jong-un (PDF), Committee for Human Rights in North Korea, ISBN 9780985648053, LCCN 2015954268, OCLC 932019384, archived (PDF) from the original on 2016-03-17
- Collins, Robert (2016), Pyongyang Republic – North Korea's Capital of Human Rights Denial (PDF), Committee for Human Rights in North Korea, ISBN 978-0-9856480-6-0, LCCN 2016932202, OCLC 945572359, archived (PDF) from the original on 2016-03-06
- Kwang-jin, Kim (2016), Gulag, Inc. The Use of Forced Labor in North Korea's Export Industries (PDF), Committee for Human Rights in North Korea, ISBN 978-0-9856480-9-1, LCCN 2016938493, OCLC 1048027048, archived (PDF) from the original on 2016-06-07
- Collins, Robert (2018), Denied from the Start – Human Rights at the Local Level in North Korea (PDF), Committee for Human Rights in North Korea, ISBN 978-0-9995358-2-0, LCCN 2018965076, OCLC 1351518311, archived (PDF) from the original on 2019-04-05
- Collins, Robert (2019), North Korea's Organization and Guidance Department – The Control Tower of Human Rights Denial (PDF), ISBN 978-0-9995358-4-4, LCCN 2019950052, OCLC 1343160720, archived (PDF) from the original on 2020-02-23
- Robinson, W. Courtland (2019), Lost Generation – The Health and Human Rights of North Korean Children, 1990–2018 (PDF), ISBN 978-0-9995358-6-8, LCCN 2019914948, OCLC 1143315464, archived (PDF) from the original on 2020-05-08
- Hutchinson, George (2022), Army of the Indoctrinated – The Suryong, the Soldier, and Information in the KPA (PDF), Committee for Human Rights in North Korea, ISBN 978-1-7356515-4-5, LCCN 2022931463, OCLC 1392167163, archived (PDF) from the original on 2023-03-11
- Stanton, Joshua (2023), The Root of All Evil – Money, Rice, Crime & Law in North Korea (PDF), ISBN 978-1-7356515-7-6, LCCN 2022947503, archived (PDF) from the original on 2024-06-26
- Collins, Robert (2023), Propaganda and Agitation Department – Kim Jong-Un Regime's Sword of Indoctrination (PDF), Committee for Human Rights in North Korea, ISBN 978-1959391005, LCCN 2023949920, archived from the original (PDF) on 2024-05-17
- Collins, Robert (2024), Slaves to the Bomb – The Role and Fate of North Korea's Nuclear Scientists (PDF), ISBN 978-1-959391-03-6, LCCN 2024937697, archived (PDF) from the original on 2024-05-23
- Collins, Robert (2025), Coronavirus and North Korean Human Rights: Regime Responses and Future Instability Scenarios (PDF), ISBN 978-1-959391-05-0, LCCN 2025940620, archived (PDF) from the original on 2025-07-25
- Park, Jaewoo (2025), The Last Heir? Kim Ju-Ae and North Korea's Succession (PDF), ISBN 978-1-959391-07-4, LCCN 2025947199, archived (PDF) from the original on 2025-09-25
- Collins, Robert (2026), The Reconnaissance General Bureau: The Kim Regime's "Precious Treasured Sword" (PDF), archived (PDF) from the original on 2026-02-27

=== International community ===
HRNK has also produced reports examining how North Korea’s conduct interacts with the international community and global security concerns. Joshua Stanton’s Arsenal of Terror (2015) argued that the DPRK’s support for international terrorism and illicit activity justified its relisting as a state sponsor of terrorism. Digital Trenches (2019) analyzed the regime’s strategies to block foreign media and suppress outside information, particularly through restrictions on digital devices and surveillance of communications. More recently, joint inquiries with the International Bar Association concluded there was a reasonable basis to investigate Kim Jong-un and other officials for crimes against humanity in detention centers.

- DLA Piper; HRNK (2006), Failure to Protect – A Call for the UN Security Council to Act in North Korea (PDF), OCLC 123081006, archived (PDF) from the original on 2016-08-20
- Haggard, Stephan; Noland, Marcus; Chang, Yoonok; Kurlantzick, Joshua; Lankov, Andrei; Mason, Jana (2006), The North Korean Refugee Crisis – Human Rights and International Response (PDF), U.S. Committee for Human Rights in North Korea, ISBN 0-9771-1111-3, LCCN 2006934326, OCLC 76955324, archived (PDF) from the original on 2012-12-08
- Cammarota, Paolo; Crace, Joe; Worly, Kim; Zaltzman, Haim (2007), Legal Strategies for Protecting Human Rights in North Korea (PDF), OCLC 190790078, archived (PDF) from the original on 2013-01-02
- Havel, Vacláv; Bondevik, Kjell Magne; Wiesell, Ellie (2008), Failure to Protect – The Ongoing Challenge of North Korea (PDF), OCLC 713270078, archived (PDF) from the original on 2013-02-03
- Young, Lee Hae (2009), Lives for Sale – Personal Accounts of Women Fleeing North Korea to China (PDF), Committee for Human Rights in North Korea, ISBN 9780985648077, OCLC 770708998, archived (PDF) from the original on 2013-02-03
- Yamamoto, Yoshi (2011), Taken! – North Korea's Criminal Abduction of Citizens of Other Countries (PDF), Committee for Human Rights in North Korea, ISBN 9780985648084, LCCN 2011907022, OCLC 803422778, archived (PDF) from the original on 2013-06-29
- Stanton, Joshua (2015), Arsenal of Terror – North Korea, State Sponsor of Terrorism (PDF), U.S. Committee for Human Rights in North Korea, ISBN 978-0-9856480-3-9, LCCN 2015937031, OCLC 936722162, archived (PDF) from the original on 2015-06-27
- Williams, Martyn (2019), Digital Trenches – North Korea's Information Counter-Offensive (PDF), ISBN 978-0-9995358-8-2, LCCN 2019919723, OCLC 1152252506, archived (PDF) from the original on 2020-03-14
- Collins, Robert (2021), South Africa's Apartheid & North Korea's Songbun – Parallels in Crimes Against Humanity (PDF), ISBN 978-1-7356515-0-7, LCCN 2020944705, OCLC 1378309409, archived (PDF) from the original on 2021-02-27
- Hawk, David (2021), Human Rights in the Democratic People's Republic of Korea – The Role of the United Nations (PDF), Committee for Human Rights in North Korea, ISBN 978-1-7356515-2-1, LCCN 2021937593, archived (PDF) from the original on 2021-07-01
- Jong-yil, Ra (2022), The Rangoon Bombing Terrorist, Kang Min-chol (PDF), ISBN 978-1-7356515-6-9, LCCN 2022944338, OCLC 1374246233, archived (PDF) from the original on 2023-07-15
- Scarlatoiu, Greg; Ha, Raymond; Lee, Hyunseung (2022), North Korean Workers Officially Dispatched to China & Russia – Human Rights Denial, Chain of Command & Control (PDF), archived (PDF) from the original on 2023-02-12
