= North Korean Human Rights Act of 2016 =

South Korean law

North Korean Human Rights Act
- Republic of Korea Emblem
- Citation: Act No. 14070
- Passed: March 3, 2016
- Effective: September 4, 2016

The North Korean Human Rights Act (NKHRA) was passed on March 3, 2016, by the Seoul National Assembly in the Republic of Korea. The act sets clear guidelines for the protection and advancement of human rights for current and former North Korean citizens in accordance with the Universal Declaration of Human Rights. The North Korean Human Rights Act became effective on September 4, 2016.

Act No. 14070 (NKHRA) outlines everything from the funding, research, and agencies to be established in order to carry out the purpose of the act. The NKHRA will create an annual plan to remedy alleged human rights abuses in North Korea and provide humanitarian assistance to North Korean citizens. It calls for the formation of an advisory committee that addresses problems faced by prisoners of war and separated families in the North. With the large number of afflicted individuals targeted by the NKHRA in mind, the act gives preference to the most vulnerable social groups such as children when assistance is to be provided. The act also aims to secure the physical safety of defectors and increases the flow of information to them by providing appropriate financial assistance to South Korean civil groups vis a vis specifically created bodies such as the North Korea Human Rights Foundation and the North Korean Human Rights Archive.

== Background ==
Since the mid-2000s, the Seoul National Assembly has promulgated legislation that seeks to foster a more informed relationship between the Republic of Korea (ROK) and the Democratic People's Republic of Korea (DPRK). The most notable new enactments include the Inter-Korea Exchange & Cooperation Act, the Inter- Korean Cooperation Fund Act, the Development of Inter-Korea Relations Act, and most recently the North Korean Human Rights Act. (Note: The NKHRA is to supersede all existing legislation with reference to human rights, except where expressly stated otherwise. However, Article 15 of the Inter-Korean Relations Act is mentioned will "apply mutatis mutandis to the matters necessary to appoint the representatives for North-South dialogue on human rights.") Over this period, some NGOs have been openly critical of governmental commitment to addressing issues of human rights in North Korea. These groups have argued that attention given to humanitarian issues in North Korea tapered off following the Great Famine or "Arduous March." Historically, consistent aid-focused campaigns were positively correlated to the amount of aid provided to the DPRK after 1995. From 2004 to 2012, bilateral and multilateral aid expressed a steep downward trend before eventually returning to its pre-1995 levels, as the broad network of NGOS campaigning for North Korean aid became limited to a few strategic advocacy groups. Organizations like Good Friends (Choŭn pŏddŭl) continued to bring awareness to North Korean human rights abuses by distributing photographs of famished North Korean children as one method for generating funding.

Such scrutiny came after various iterations of what ultimately became the NKHRA spent eleven years working its way toward approval from the National Assembly. During this time, both the United States and Japan passed legislation addressing North Korean human rights in 2004 and 2006, respectively. A 2014 UN Commission of Inquiry Report did little to assuage the concerns of human rights advocacy groups after the commission identified clear examples of the afflictions of North Korean citizens. In response, the Human Rights Foundation (HRF) later developed a Global Coalition for the North Korean Human Rights Act in September 2015 as a part of its continued Disrupt North Korea Project upon voicing its frustration with the National Assembly. The group consists of policymakers, activists and former heads of state. Prominent members include: Jimmy Wales, Larry Diamond, Viktor Yushchenko, Steven Pinker, Emil Constantinescu, Nurul Izzah Anwar, and Srdja Popovic. Seeking to bring awareness to alleged North Korean human rights abuses and to pressure the South Korean government to be more proactive, the Human Rights Foundation, among others - including Amnesty International and Human Rights Watch - continue to advocate for human rights in North Korea following the enactment of the NKHRA.

== Notable provisions ==
=== Human Rights Advisory Committee ===
The NKHRA calls for a North Korean Human Rights Advisory Committee to be established within the Ministry of Unification. Detailed in Articles 5–6, selection of one half of the ten member advisory committee is dictated by the National Assembly to the Ministry of Unification on the basis of recommendations made by the political party to whom the President belongs. The advisory committee maintains a consultative role with the Minister of Unification. Under the Act, the Ministry will develop a long-term (three year) "master-plan" to promote human rights dialogue and provide humanitarian assistance after receiving advice and information gathered by the advisory committee, which will allow the Ministry to be more effective on a yearly basis under its dynamic short-term action plan.

=== Human Rights Foundation ===
Per Articles 10-12 of the act, a Human Rights Foundation will be established as a corporation once it has filed for incorporation. Selection of one half of the twelve-member board of the foundation is dictated by the National Assembly to the Ministry of Unification on the basis of recommendations made by the political party to whom the President belongs, with a chief director selected by the Minister of Unification. The foundation is given the authority to conduct policy research and development in order to prevent human rights abuses and promote dialogue between North and South Korea. The act gives the foundation authority to delegate responsibility (while providing financial assistance) for researching human rights and humanitarian issues to NGOs and local agencies. Articles 16-17 canonize Foundation members as public officials and outline applicable provisions of the Criminal Act to which they are held accountable. Members found to be in receipt of any subsidy of the NKHRA are subject to a fine of ₩30 million and up to three years in prison.

=== Human Rights Archive ===
Article 13 calls for the establishment of a Human Rights Archive tasked with collecting and recording information pertaining to human rights and humanitarian assistance. The Minister of Unification gives express permission for the Archive to delegate any of the functions with which it is tasked to outside institutions while providing them with subsidies to cover any expenses incurred. All data collected and stored by the Archive is required to be transferred to the Ministry of Justice on a quarterly basis, which would allow cases to be systematically built against North Korean policymakers.

=== Reporting and Cooperation ===
Under the act, the Minister of Unification is required to annually report to the National Assembly updates on the current status of human rights and any improvements accounted for by the act. Article 9 §2 expressly calls for the appointment of an Ambassador for Human Rights in North Korea to the Ministry of Foreign Affairs. This provision is intended to facilitate cooperation with international organizations, international bodies and foreign governments in information exchange and promoting awareness of human rights concerns in North Korea, internationally.

- All Foundation and Archive activities are under the purview of the Minister of Unification. By proxy, those delegated to local agencies would be as well.
- Article 14 gives the Minister of Unification the power to "request cooperation from other administrative agencies, public organizations, and relevant persons to submit materials, state opinions, or provide cooperation for other matters necessary for policy implementation." In the event of such a request, the head of the organization is required to comply with the request.

== See also ==
- Inter-Korean Relations
- Human rights in North Korea
- Report of the Commission of Inquiry on Human Rights in the Democratic People's Republic of Korea
