= Fact-finding =

Fact-finding may refer to:

- Trier of fact, also called a finder of facts, one or more people who determines facts in a legal proceeding
- United Nations fact-finding mission, a mission carried out by the United Nations to discover facts

== See also ==
- Fact-checking
