= David Kirby (judge) =

Australian judge

The Honourable David Kirby AM KC

Judge of the Supreme Court of New South Wales
- In office 12 August 1998 – 14 October 2011
- Succeeded by: Christine Adamson SC

Personal details
- Born: 22 June 1943 (age 83) Sydney, Australia
- Education: University of Sydney (BA, LLB)
- Occupation: Judge; Jurist; Lecturer; Barrister; Solicitor

David Kirby AM KC (born 22 June 1943) is a former judge of the Supreme Court of New South Wales, and brother of former High Court judge Michael Kirby.

== Early life and education ==
Born in Sydney, David Kirby was the fourth son and child of Donald (Don) Kirby and Jean Langmore Kirby (née Knowles). Elder brother David Charles died at the age of 18 months.

Following in the footsteps of elder brother Michael, David attended state schools, commencing at North Strathfield Public School, followed by Summer Hill Public School for Opportunity Classes, and then Fort Street High School (then Fort Street Boys High School) in Sydney.

After graduating from high school, again like elder brother Michael, David later attended the University of Sydney, where he earned a Bachelor of Arts and a Bachelor of Laws.

== Career ==
Kirby was appointed Queen's Counsel in 1985. He served as an Associate Judge of the District Court of New South Wales from 1988 to 1989. Kirby was appointed as a judge of the NSW Supreme Court in 1998.

From 1972 to 1975, Kirby lectured at the University of Sydney. He has also served as a part-time Commissioner of the NSW Law Reform Commission (2002–06), Trustee of the Centennial Park Trust (1984–88), and Secretary of the Council for Civil Liberties (1973).

Kirby has also served in several inquiries, including:

- Counsel Assisting in the Gretley Mine Disaster (1997–98)
- Counsel Assisting in the Seaview CAA Inquiry (1995–96)
- Counsel Assisting the Inquiry by the Independent Commission Against Corruption into Waverley Council (1989)
- Counsel Assisting the TAB Inquiry (1983)
- Commissioner in the Inquiry into Warringah Expressway (1982)
- Commissioner in the Kyeemagh/Chullora Road Inquiry (1979–81)

Kirby was appointed a Member of the Order of Australia in the 2026 Australia Day Honours for "significant service to the judiciary, and to the law".

== Personal life ==
Unlike his extroverted brother Michael, David has stated that, as a schoolboy, he was shy and more interested in sports.

=== Family ===
Kirby self-effacingly stated that he went to the Bar to impress his then girlfriend, Marie-Line France Hervic, a Jewish girl who later decided to become a barrister herself. They later married and had Nicolas and Elisabeth. Nicolas and Elisabeth were raised Jewish and, with their mother, attended the Emanuel Synagogue. Hervic died on 30 September 1986.

After her death, Kirby married Judith (Judy), with whom he has son Patrick.

David's father, Donald, was the only child of Alma Caroline (Norma) Grey, a single working mother of English—Irish descent. Norma became pregnant at 15 with Donald Kirby while in a relationship with a then-17-year-old Victor Kirby, a Catholic who had arrived after the Great Famine. Norma' parents were John Emmanuel Gray, an English brick- and boiler- maker and Annie Lyons. Annie's father Harry Lyons, had emigrated from Dublin to Sydney in the 1850s, following the Great Famine and her mother's name was Mary.

His mother, Jean Langmore Knowles, was born in Berwick, Victoria to William Knowles, an Ulster Scot from Ballymena, and Margaret, as one of four daughters. Jean was a graduate of Sydney Girls High School, leaving with a Leaving Certificate, a rarity for that time, and worked in numerous paid jobs by virtue of her own successes and ability. Donald Kirby, aged 16, and Jean Knowles first met at Saint Martin's Anglican Church, Kensington. Donald attended Sydney Technical School in Ultimo, and then worked as a general assistant, then tool and machinery salesman at a hardware firm. The two were engaged on Jean's 21st birthday, and were married in March 1937, a month after Donald turned 21, and resided in their first home at Bloomfield Street, South Coogee.

Kirby's brothers are also lawyers; Michael was a judge of the Supreme Court of New South Wales and of the High Court of Australia, whilst Donald was a solicitor.

Sister Diana was a nurse in the Colorectal Unit of the Royal Prince Alfred Hospital. She died, aged 67, in early February 2014 at her home, Pendey Street, Willoughby.
