= Sonja Biserko =

Serbian human rights activist (born 1948)

Sonja Biserko Соња Бисерко
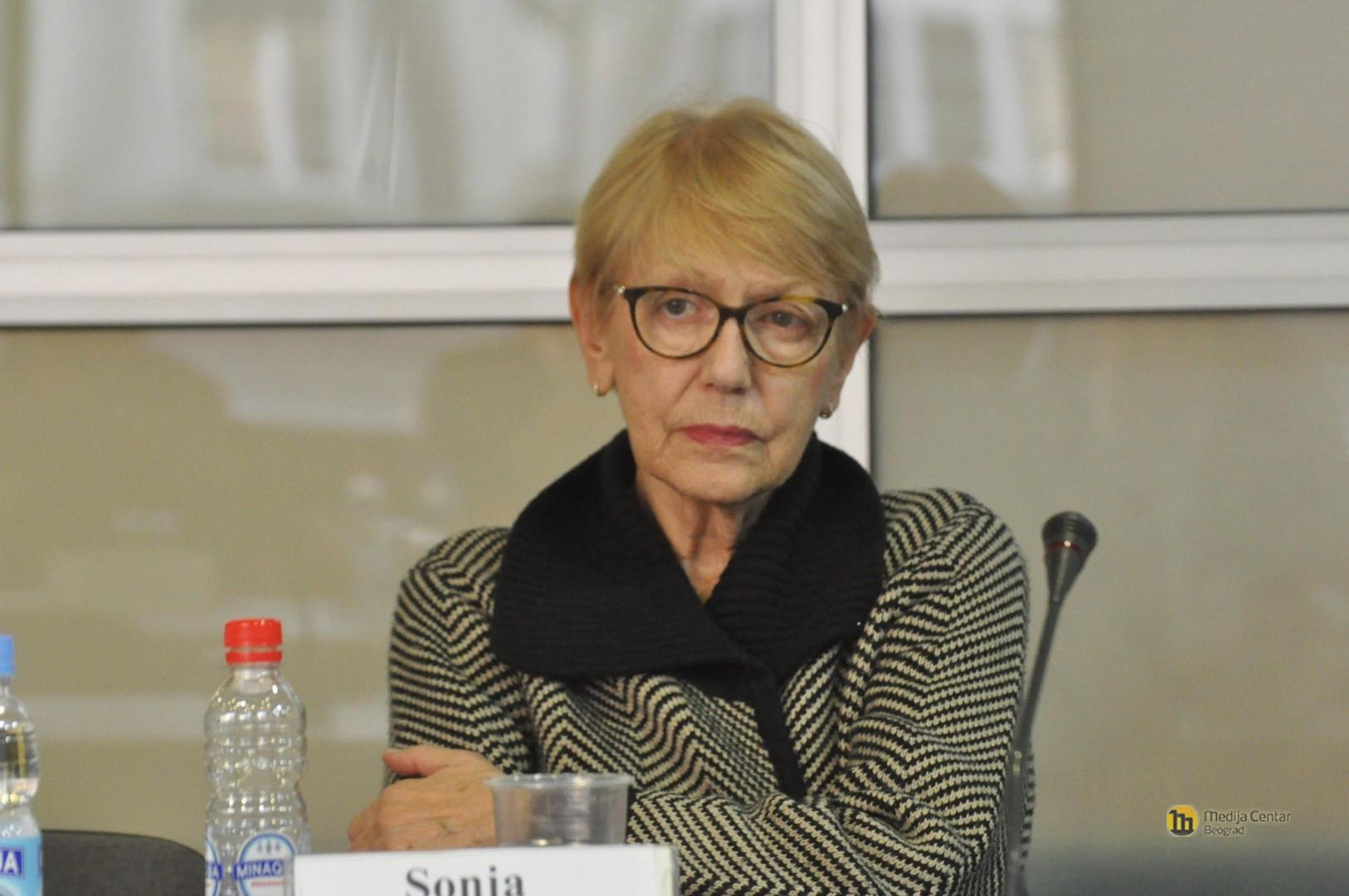
- Sonja Biserko in 2023
- Born: 14 February 1948 (age 78); Belgrade, Yugoslavia
- Education: University of Belgrade
- Occupation: Human rights activist
- Organization: Helsinki Committee for Human Rights in Serbia (1994–)

Sonja Biserko (Serbo-Croatian Cyrillic: Соња Бисерко; born 14 February 1948) is a Serbian activist for human rights. She is the founder and president of the Helsinki Committee for Human Rights in Serbia.

On 8 May 2013, she was appointed as a member of the United Nations human rights investigation into North Korea, with Michael Kirby and Marzuki Darusman. On 18 February 2014, they published a report which received worldwide attention.

== Biography ==
Sonja Biserko was born in Belgrade, FPR Yugoslavia (today Serbia) to a Serb father and a Croat mother. She holds a degree from the University of Belgrade Faculty of Economics. She served as a diplomat for the former Yugoslavia in London and at the United Nations in Geneva for over 20 years until 1991 when she resigned her diplomatic position in protest over the policies of Slobodan Milošević amid rising nationalism throughout Yugoslavia. In Geneva in 1991 she organised one of the first meetings of the Yugoslav opposition to Milosevic. In 1994 she founded the Helsinki Committee for Human Rights in Serbia (HCHRS) and she is the organisation's current President. HCHRS, a member of the European network of Helsinki Committees for Human Rights and formerly part of the dissolved International Helsinki Federation for Human Rights, is a professional organisation working to promote the rule of law and protection of human rights in Serbia, challenging nationalist dogma, documenting war crimes and acting as advocate for the victimised and disenfranchised.

Biserko's ongoing work for human rights has included documenting the resurgence of nationalist sentiment that followed the war in Kosovo, the continuing threats to minorities, attempts to falsify or deny the historical record and efforts to undermine multi-ethnic society in the former Yugoslavia. Through active support for minority and refugee communities within Serbia and Kosovo she has sought in particular to promote dialogue between Serbs and Albanians in Kosovo.

As a dissident voice of conscience criticising the nationalist agenda, she has been a controversial figure. In April 1997 she addressed the Conference on Genocide, Crimes against Humanity, and War sponsored by the University of California at Berkeley Human Rights Center on the role of the Serb media in preparing the way for genocide in former Yugoslavia, in a speech "Reporting from the Killing Fields".

In her 2009 speech accepting the City of Weimar's Human Rights Prize, she affirmed her belief that Serbia's recent past and the traumas associated with it can only be transcended by knowing and understanding that past. HCHRS's work sought to cast light on the suppression or falsification of the past. Orchestrated amnesia and reinterpretation of both the historical and recent past had resulted in failure to confront the truth and abandon the legacy of expansionist nationalist aspirations. Change could only be achieved in Serbia and the region as a whole if the truth was told.

She argued that the persistence of nationalist aspirations had fostered a climate hostile to all non-nationalistic values, including human rights, and pointed to the need for strategic change, calling for the establishment of a ‘moral minimum’ in society and in politics as the basis of Serbian statehood, opening the way for the consolidation of democracy and regional co-operation. This "moral minimum" would involve sincere co-operation with the International Criminal Tribunal for the former Yugoslavia in The Hague and recognition of the work of the Tribunal as a moral reference point.

Biserko and the staff of HCHRS have experienced threats and intimidation. Physical assaults on Biserko and break-ins at her home in 2005 and 2006 were reportedly linked to government officials who had launched a campaign of harassment and intimidation directed against the women directors of a number of Serbian human rights NGOs. In 2008 a large group of protesters, including members of Movement 1389 and Protest, gathered in front of HCHRS's office shouting abusive threats, many aimed specifically at Sonja Biserko, leaving a large cardboard swastika outside the building.

HCHRS received many threatening letters, some containing explicit death threats against Sonja Biserko, who was given no police protection. A newspaper article called her a “traitor to homogeneous Serbianhood”, disclosing her home address and information about her family. Personal information about her was also published on the newspaper's website. These media attacks and acts of aggressive intimidation were believed to be linked to the publication of the HCHRS's Annual Report for 2007, which addressed crimes against humanity of the Serbian administration in the Balkan region during the 1990s.

Sonja Biserko is the author of Srbija na Orijentu (Serbia in the East) and Yugoslavia's Implosion: The Fatal Attraction of Serbian Nationalism. Among some 140 other publications she has written about the Srebrenica genocide, the fall of Vukovar, the wars in the former Yugoslavia and war crimes and accounts of the trials of Slobodan Milošević and Vojislav Šešelj. Her works have documented the role of Serb institutions including the Serbian Orthodox Church and the Serbian Academy of Sciences and Arts in encouraging Serbian extremism and have contributed to the work of the International Criminal Tribunal for the Former Yugoslavia.

Sonja Biserko was a founding member of a European movement in Yugoslavia, the Center for Anti-War Action in the Belgrade Forum for International Relations. She is senior fellow in the United States Institute of Peace.

== Awards ==
In 1994 she received the Human Rights Award of the Lawyers Committee for Human Rights in New York. In 2005 she was one of 1000 women in the group 1000 Women for Peace nominated for the Nobel Peace Prize. In 2009 she was awarded the 2009 Human Rights Prize of the City of Weimar (Germany) jointly with Jestina Mukoko. In 2010 she was awarded the Human Rights Award of the University of Oslo.

== See also ==
- Helsinki Committee for Human Rights in Serbia
- Nataša Kandić
- Edvin Kanka Ćudić
