= United Nations fact-finding mission =

A United Nations process for investigating conflict areas

A United Nations fact-finding mission, also called a United Nations commission of inquiry, is a United Nations mission carried out with the intention to discover facts. Fact-finding missions have been sent by the UN to a number of conflict areas over the past 50 years, on a case-by-case basis. There are legal and political parameters for fact-finding, which provide a basis for a more comprehensive use of this tool, particularly by the Secretary-General.

== History ==
Fact-finding was first established during the Hague Convention of 1907, which dealt with international commissions of inquiry.

=== Declaration ===
The draft declaration, was adopted without a vote by a Special United Nations Committee at the end of a three-week sessions in New York held 4–22 February 1991. On 9 December 1991, the General Assembly adopted resolution 46/59; Declaration on Fact-finding by the United Nations in the Field of the Maintenance of International Peace and Security. The resolution emphasized "...that the ability of the United Nations to maintain international peace and security depends to a large extent on its acquiring detailed knowledge about the factual circumstances of any dispute or situation" and "...to encourage States to bear in mind the role that competent organs of the United Nations can play in ascertaining the facts in relation to disputes or situations."

== Characteristics ==
The declaration that defines and institutionalizes the use of such missions states that it is not only a tool to gather information, but also to signal concern over a potentially explosive situation. It states that fact-finding should be comprehensive, objective, impartial, and timely. It should be used at the earliest possible stage to prevent disputes. Fact-finding missions may be undertaken by the Security Council, the General Assembly and the Secretary-General, with the consent of the "receiving State". Nations, however, are asked to receive and cooperate with these missions. Refusals to do so should be explained.

== Role of the Secretary-General ==
The Secretary-General should monitor conflicts which may threaten international peace and security, and bring relevant information to the attention of the Council. He should be able to mount an emergency mission in case of need. The Secretariat's early warning capability should be enhanced.

The Secretary General's Mechanism for Investigation of Alleged Use of Chemical and Biological Weapons, requests the Secretary-General to carry out investigations in response to reports that may be brought to his attention by any member state concerning the possible use of chemical, biological or toxin weapons. The Security Council encourages the Secretary-General to carry out promptly investigations in response to these allegations brought to his attention by any Member State.

== Relation to the International Criminal Court ==
There is also a range of fact-finding procedures in the United Nations relating to serious violations of human rights and International humanitarian law, as well as fact-finding on the crimes of aggression, genocide, war crimes and crimes against humanity which is carried out by the International Criminal Court. Professor Lyal S. Sunga discusses how UN human rights special procedures fact-finding can help the International Criminal Court find facts and how the two should be made complementary.

== See also ==
- Report of the Commission of Inquiry on Human Rights in the Democratic People's Republic of Korea
