= Report of the Commission of Inquiry on Human Rights in the Democratic People's Republic of Korea =

2014 United Nations report

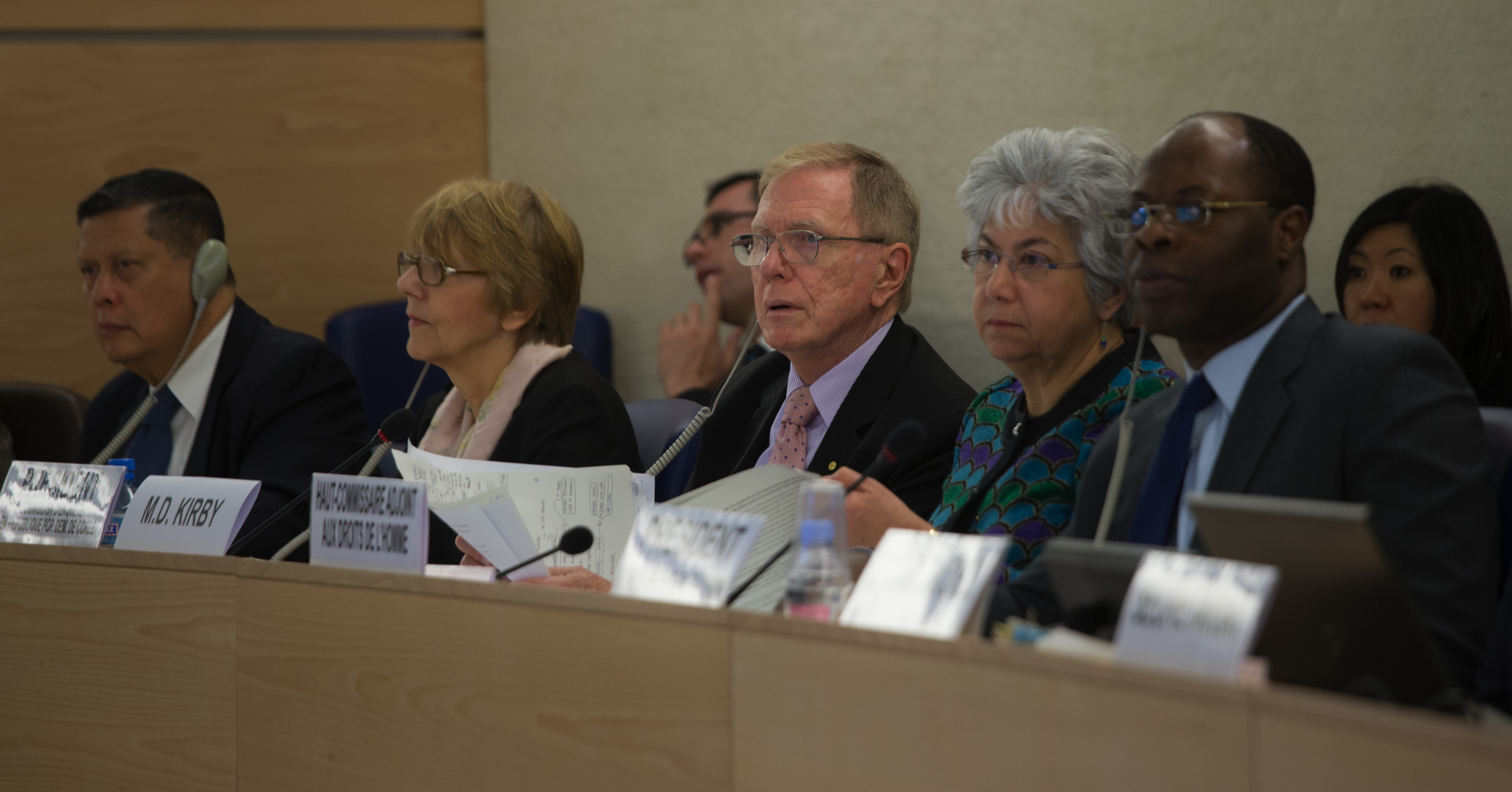
- Commissioners Marzuki Darusman, Sonja Biserko, and Michael Kirby (from left to center) presenting their report at the United Nations in 2014.

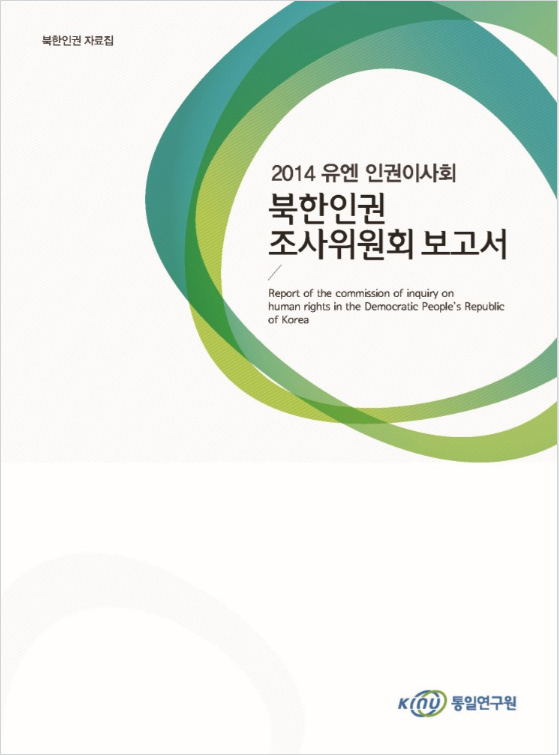
- Cover of the Korean version of the Report
- Presented: 7 February 2014 (general distribution)
- Location: Geneva, Switzerland, United Nations Human Rights Council; Also available online
- Author(s): (Australia) Michael Donald Kirby (Chair) (Serbia) Sonja Biserko (Indonesia) Marzuki Darusman (Special Rapporteur)
- Purpose: Investigate the grave, systematic and widespread violations of human rights in North Korea

The Report of the Commission of Inquiry on Human Rights in the Democratic People's Republic of Korea is the landmark document resulting from the investigations on human rights in North Korea commissioned by the United Nations Human Rights Council in 2013 and concluded in 2014.

The report unequivocally concluded that the North Korean government systematically violated human rights including freedom of thought, expression and religion; freedom from discrimination; freedom of movement and residence; and the right to food. The Commission further determined that North Korea had committed crimes against humanity and manifestly failed to uphold its responsibility to protect. These crimes entail "extermination, murder, enslavement, torture, imprisonment, rape, forced abortions and other sexual violence, persecution on political, religious, racial and gender grounds, the forcible transfer of populations, the enforced disappearance of persons and the inhumane act of knowingly causing prolonged starvation".

Based on the findings in the report, the UN General Assembly passed resolution 69/188 in 2014 condemning human rights abuses and urging the UN Security Council to refer the situation to the International Criminal Court (ICC). That same year, and for the first time, the Security Council convened to address human rights in North Korea, but no resolution was adopted. In 2024, commemorating its 10th anniversary, authors and experts continued to deem the report the most exhaustive published, with its findings remaining relevant and most of its recommendations remaining unheeded.

== History ==
=== Background ===
With mounting evidence of human rights abuses in North Korea documented by NGOs and governments during the preceding three decades, since 2003 the UN General Assembly and the UN Human Rights Council (HRC) have repeatedly passed resolutions expressing their concerns about the violations of human rights in North Korea.

The UN Commission on Human Rights (the predecessor of the HRC) established the mandate for the Special Rapporteur on the situation of human rights in North Korea in 2004, issuing reports annually. North Korea did not cooperate with this mandate. In addition, in 2009, the North Korean government was the first state to not accept any of the 167 recommendations received from the adoption of its first Universal Periodic Review (a review on human rights conducted by the HRC on all UN members). Both the Special Rapporteur and the UN human rights commissioner denounced grave violations, with the latter saying that the situation in the DPRK was "the worst in the whole world".

Before the HRC established the commission of inquiry, the Security Council unanimously approved resolution 2094 reinforcing sanctions against the North Korean regime in retaliation for having conducted a third nuclear test a month earlier.

=== Need for a full-fledged inquiry ===
The special rapporteurs, working with one single assistant, had conveyed in their annual reports "the need for the establishment of an inquiry mechanism with adequate resources" that "could produce a more complete picture, quantify and qualify the violations in terms of international law, attribute responsibility to particular actors or perpetrators of these violations and suggest effective courses of international action."

This need was echoed in 2012 by 179 North Korean defectors who wrote to foreign ministers of many countries urging them to establish a commission of inquiry. Over 40 human rights organizations (under the banner of the International Coalition to Stop Crimes Against Humanity in North Korea) and legislators around the world backed the idea. The intent was to broaden the international spotlight on North Korea's nuclear program to human rights.

== The Commission ==
=== Mandate ===
On 21 March 2013, the UN's 47-nation Human Rights Council established the Commission of Inquiry (COI) on Human Rights in the DPRK with resolution 22/13. No HRC member required the decision be submitted to a vote, making it the first time a resolution to create a commission was adopted without any opposition. The resolution was sponsored by the European Union and Japan and backed by the United States. With no Chinese or Russian vote on the Council at the time, North Korea lacked an ally willing to oppose the inquiry.

The COI was made up of a panel of three unpaid experts: Michael Kirby (Chair; Australia), Marzuki Darusman (the existing Special Rapporteur on the situation of human rights in the DPRK; Indonesia), and Sonja Biserko (Serbia). The panel was supported by a secretariat of nine human rights officials provided by the High Commissioner for Human Rights.

The Commission's mandate was to investigate the "systematic, widespread and grave violations of human rights in the DPRK" including, in particular, violations in nine specific substantive areas: 1) right to food; 2) prison camps; 3) torture and inhuman treatment; 4) arbitrary arrest and detention; 5) discrimination in basic human rights and fundamental freedoms; 6) freedom of expression; 7) right to life; 8) freedom of individual movement; and 9) enforced disappearances and abductions of nationals of other states.

The mandate indicated the inquiry should pursue three inter-linked objectives: investigate in depth human rights violations; document witness accounts; and ensure accountability especially for crimes against humanity.

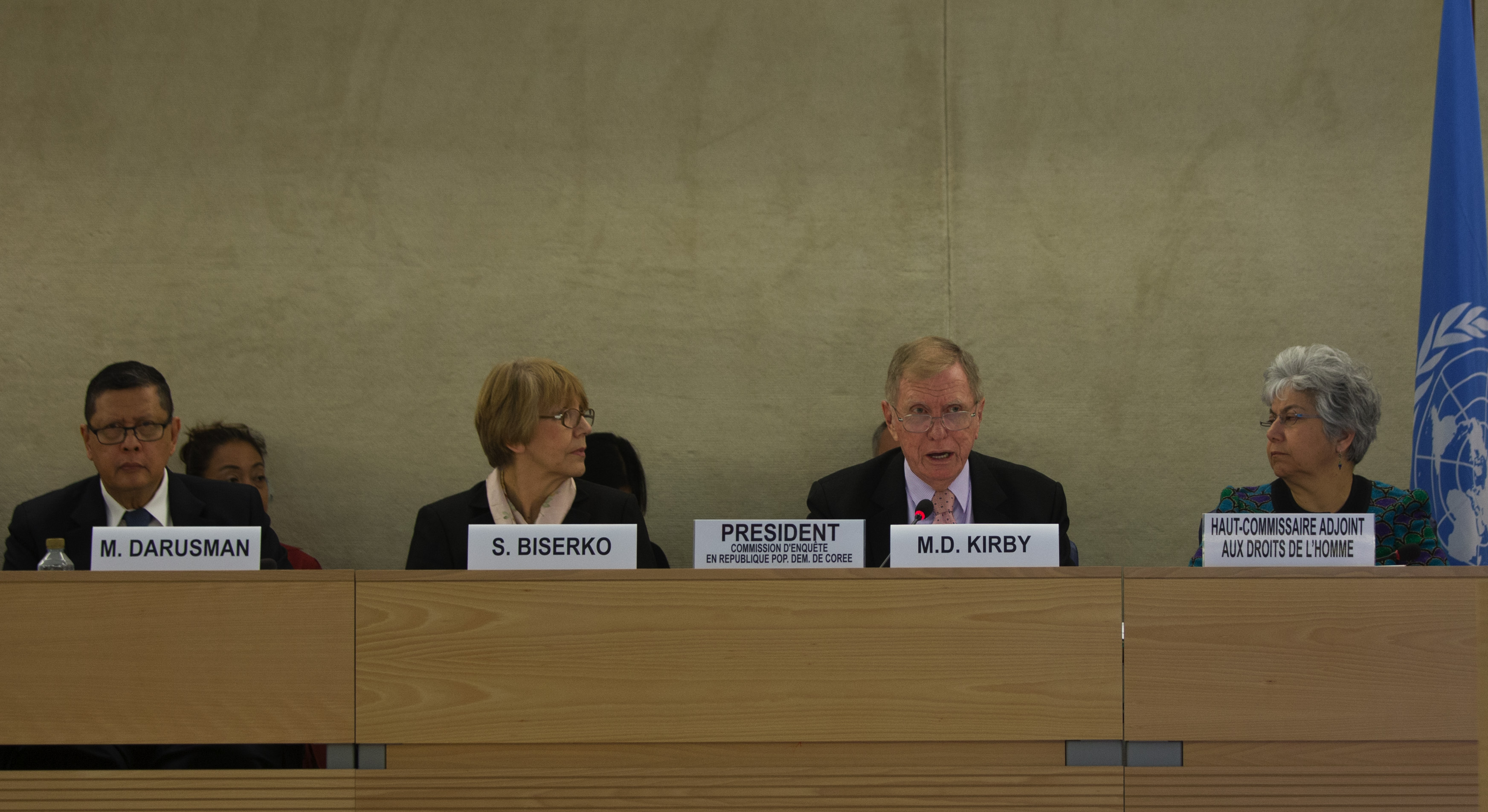
Commissioners Marzuki Darusman, Sonja Biserko, and Michael Donald Kirby (Chair) present their report to the UN Human Rights Council

=== Outcome ===
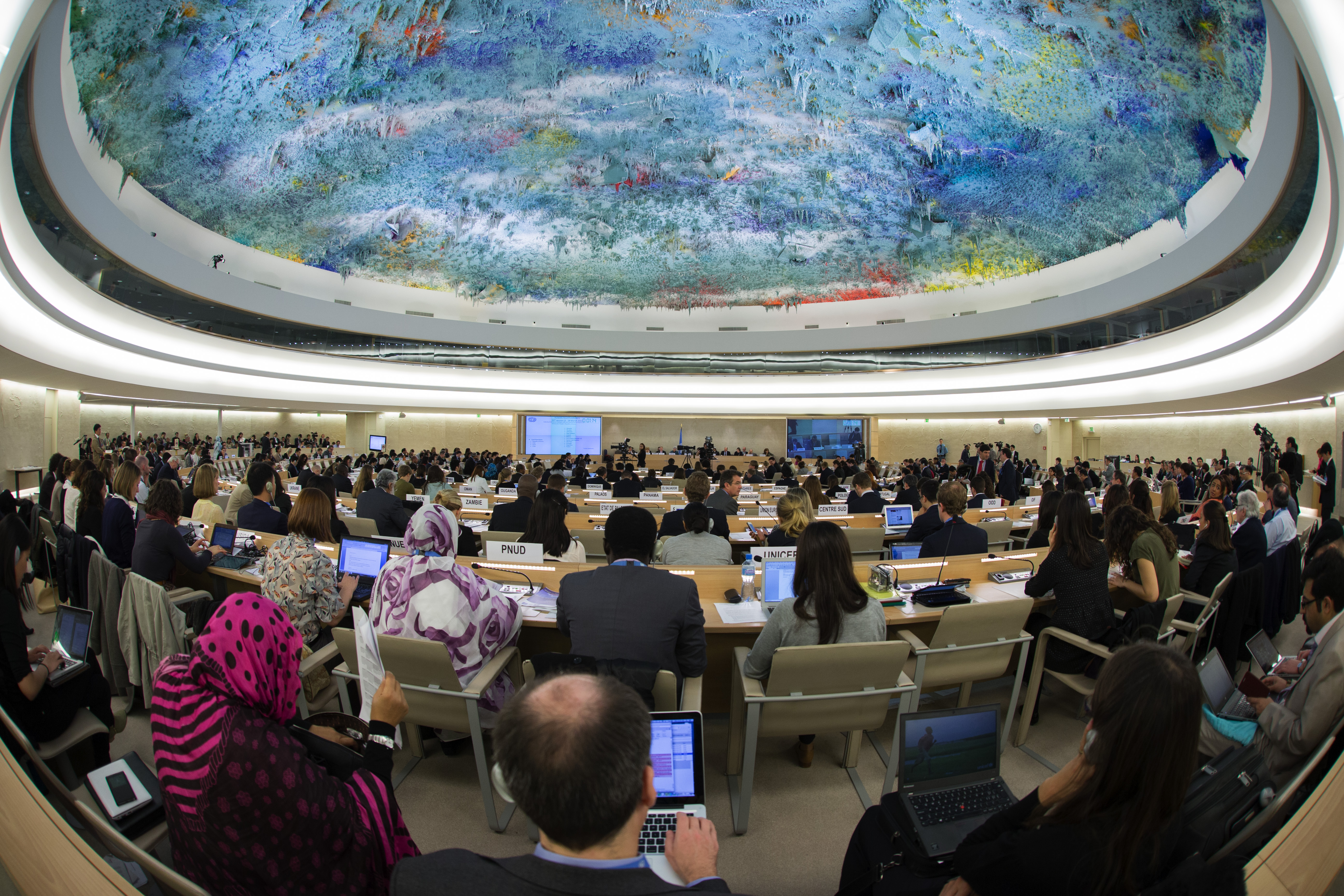
Presentation of COI Report on North Korea at the Human Rights Council

The Commission's report was made public on 7 February 2014. It was described as the most authoritative assessment of human rights in North Korea, and said to shift international focus on North Korea from nuclear issues to human rights.

The Commission concluded that the North Korean government was perpetrating "unspeakable atrocities" against its own people on a vast scale and committing "widespread, systematic and gross" violations of human rights that amounted to crimes against humanity. The Chair of the Commission called these atrocities "strikingly similar" to crimes committed by Nazi Germany in World War II. Crimes included execution, enslavement, starvation, rape and forced abortion.

Based on the COI findings, on 26 March 2014 the HRC passed a resolution (30 in favor, 6 against, 11 abstentions) urging the General Assembly to refer the findings to the Security Council and for the Security Council to take action, including referral to the International Criminal Court (ICC).

On 17 April 2014 members of the Security Council convened an informal meeting to hear the panel's views on what should be done next. This was an unusually expeditious gathering and the first one to address human rights in North Korea. China and Russia did not attend.

UN General Assembly Resolution 69/188 vote on 18 December 2014 condemning the human rights abuses in North Korea and urging the Security Council to refer the report to the ICC. In favour Against Abstained Absent Non-member

On 18 December 2014 the General Assembly passed several resolutions (including 69/188; 116 in favor, 20 against, 53 abstentions) condemning the state-sponsored human rights abuses in the country and urging the Security Council to refer the report to the ICC.

On 22 December 2014, the Security Council held a meeting to evaluate the commission's report, its first official meeting to discuss human rights in DPRK. China objected to the meeting, which led to an unusual procedural vote, the first in eight years, on whether the meeting should be held. Only Russia agreed with China. Despite these objections, the meeting was held, because procedural votes do not allow for vetoes. However, China would be able to use its veto power to block a decision to refer the report to the ICC, making it very unlikely that such a resolution would pass.

In December 2015, the U.S. added "human rights abuses in North Korea" to the permanent UNSC agenda, making the subject a recurring item of discussion from that point forward. China again protested (along with Angola, Russia, and Venezuela) the proposal, asserting that human rights is not a topic to be discussed at the UNSC, called for a procedure vote but lost it.

Also in December 2015, the UN High Commissioner for Human Rights Zeid Ra'ad Al Hussein called on the UNSC to refer DPRK to the ICC.

In 2017, UN Human Rights Council adopted a resolution to authorize the use of criminal justice experts to devise legal strategies for eventual prosecutions of violations by North Korea. It also authorized the creation of a central repository for evidence to be used in such prosecutions. Actual prosecution remains uncertain.

== Summary of report findings ==
=== Violations ===
==== Thought, expression, religion ====
Overview: The DPRK seeks the absolute brainwashing of its population. It carries a thorough life-long indoctrination; exerts total control over the flow of domestic and foreign information; prevents any social or ideological challenges by prohibiting any other ideologies, religions or independent civil society organizations; and enforces its monopoly of thought through harsh punishments including torture and death.

- State's monopoly of thought: From birth, citizens since undergo all-encompassing indoctrination, ubiquitous propaganda, and tough enforcement to propagate the official personality cult of the Kim dynasty and enforce absolute obedience. Citizens of all ages are mandated to participate in strenuous indoctrination-driven activities, including self-criticism sessions. All education directly or indirectly reinforces the State doctrine. State surveillance permeates the private lives of all citizens to ensure virtually no expression of dissent; several State departments, as well as ordinary citizens police and report on each other.
- No competing ideas or organizations: All social activities are controlled by the Workers' Party of Korea; there are no truly independent civil society organizations. Only the censored state-controlled media is legal. Access to outside information and media is actively persecuted. Foreign journalists have virtually no access, only visiting pre-approved sites and receiving scripted answers during interviews. Religion is prohibited, as it is seen as a competing ideology and social organizing platform.
- Harsh enforcement: Any departures from State policy (even a journalist's misspelling of the leader's name or the unintentional tarnishing of a framed image of the leader) may be met with discrimination, violence, incarceration, torture, and executions. Often the punishments extend to the family of the accused.
- Changes – Seepage of foreign media: Despite harsh crackdowns, foreign information and media is increasingly flowing into the DPRK due to advancements in market forces and information technology. While historically public protests are rare and punished, in the late 2000s there were sporadic group demonstrations demanding better economic conditions.

==== Discrimination ====
Overview: Residency, occupation, intensity of criminal punishment, and access to food, housing, health care, education have been contingent on a State-assigned inheritable social class (Songbun) system. This system is deflating with 1990s post-famine marketization; women earn more through entrepreneurship than males in the State employment system. Women suffer from pervasive bribery, sexual assault, and gender violence as the male-controlled State grows corrupt, poor, and resentful.

- State policy of social classes: The State enforces a rigidly stratified society with entrenched patterns of official discrimination. A citizen's potential success in life and the level of services provided by the State are predetermined by a State-assigned social class (songbun). Each individual's and family's designation is decided according to the apparatus' perception of their ideological loyalty to the regime. Discrimination applies to geographic segregation, occupation, criminal punishment, and access to food, housing, health care, and education. Applying intergenerational responsibility and collective punishment, a family's social class (songbun) is passed down to its children and grandchildren. Each individual's status is recorded in a registration system, inaccessible to him or her. The lowest songbun was given to groups including former wealthy industrialists, alleged spies, Catholics, Buddhists, and South Korean prisoners of war.
- Discrimination of women: The complete denial of the freedoms of expression and association has exacerbated the generally unequal status of women. Food shortage and gender discrimination makes some women especially vulnerable. The male-dominated State preys on both economically advancing women and marginalized women who suffer bribery, sexual assault, and gender violence. Victims are not afforded protection by the State or recourse to justice. Structural problems are also major contributing factors to the high levels of trafficking in women and girls who escape from North Korea to China.
- Changes – Emergence of rudimentary markets: Before the 1990s famine, relative wealth and success exclusively flowed from the center of political power onto the privileged classes. Despite the State's stringent restrictions, with 1990s economic collapse, a rudimentary market economy emerged, enhanced by some use of information technology. These markets are transformative socioeconomic forces, diminishing the importance of the State-assigned social class (songbun) for a part of the population. Many women pushed out of the State's workforce are now earning more through market entrepreneurship than males employed by the State. Privately generated wealth is the source of survival for many families, also leading to widespread corruption. Some women's access to greater wealth is subject to fines, bribery, and violent resentment from males. At the very top and very bottom ends of the North Korean hierarchy, songbun still matters.

==== Movement and residence ====
Overview: The State imposes on citizens where they must live and work according to their social class (songbun), limits their internal movement, and generally prohibits international travel. China frequently forcibly repatriates North Korean refugees, who will be subject to harsh punishments upon their return, especially if they have been in contact with other ideologies.

- Residence: The State has created a socioeconomically and physically segregated society where people considered politically loyal to the leadership can live and work in favorable locations, while families considered politically suspect are relegated to marginalized areas. The State systematically banishes entire families from the capital city if one family member commits what is deemed a serious political crime.
- North-South family reunions: The State places severe impediments to family reunions that have been long-separated between North and South Korea. The Commission calls these restrictions arbitrary, cruel, and inhuman.
- Domestic and international travel: Citizens are not allowed to leave their province temporarily without official authorization, and there is a virtually absolute ban on ordinary citizens traveling abroad. This isolates citizens, who have little contact between local communities and no contact with the outside world. China apprehends and forcibly repatriates North Koreans (impinging on the prohibition of refoulement under international refugee law), who then experience persecution, torture, prolonged arbitrary detention, and even execution upon their return. The DPRK security apparatus interrogates (at times using torture) and evaluates each repatriated individual. For individuals deemed to only be seeking food, they are sent to short term labor camps; those that had intended to go to the ROK, are sent to an ordinary prison camps for re-education; and those escapees who in addition had been in contact with Christian groups or the ROK's intelligence network, are sent to harsher political prison camps.
- Trafficking of women and violence against children: Women who attempt to leave the country become extremely vulnerable to trafficking in persons, potentially being forced to marry or into prostitution. Women who give birth to children in China cannot register them with the Chinese state and remain stateless and unprotected. Repatriated women in prison who are pregnant are regularly subjected to forced abortions, and babies born to repatriated women are often killed. These practices are driven by racist attitudes towards interracial children of Koreans.

==== Food ====
Overview: The State exerts a monopoly over food distribution. It has prioritized feeding those whom the authorities believe to be crucial in maintaining the regime over those deemed expendable. Beyond shortages outside the control of the State, decisions, actions and omissions by the State caused the death of at least hundreds of thousands of people during 1990s famine. Those who survived were inflicted permanent physical and psychological injuries, becoming a stunted generation.

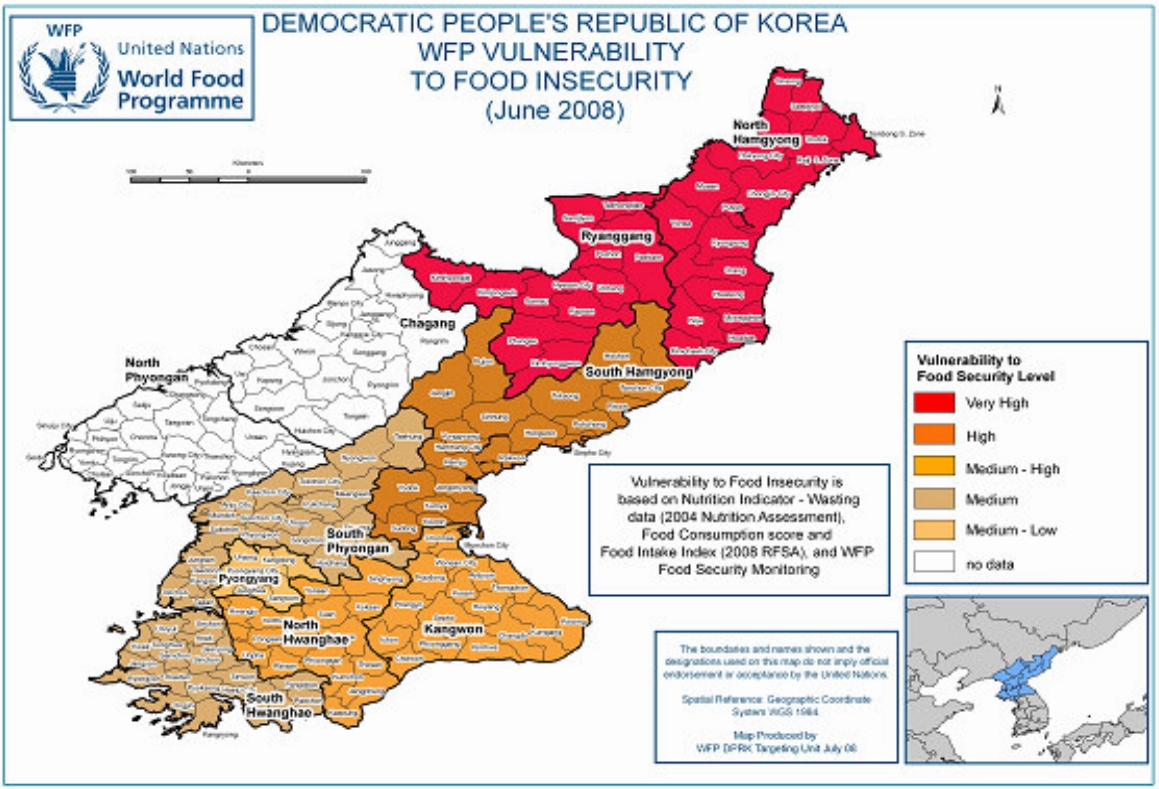
Map of DPR Korea Food Vulnerability and Insecurity 2008, included in the COI report

- State-controlled food leading to starvation: The communist state seeks complete control over food distribution as a means to sustain its supremacy over the population. Since the late 1980s there has been scarcity, leading to chronic malnutrition and episodes of heightened mass starvation and death. The many children who grew up seriously malnourished have suffered from stunted growth, undermining their physical and intellectual development for life. The government has chosen to undersupply and starve large swathes of the population by diverting resources towards the favorable treatment of the higher social classes, maintaining bloated propaganda and military apparatuses, and the luxury life of the top leadership. The State has also used deliberate starvation as a means of control and punishment in detention facilities. The state continues to neglect the most vulnerable.
- Structural deficiencies: The adoption of optimal economic solutions over those in accordance with Party directives has been prevented by structural deficiencies. These include the lack of transparency, accountability, and democratic institutions, as well as restrictions on freedom of expression, information and association. The State has evaded structural reforms to the economy and agriculture for fear of losing its control over the population. Despite the State's inability to provide its people with adequate food, it maintained laws and controls effectively criminalizing people's use of key survival mechanisms, particularly moving within or outside the country in search of food and trading or working in informal markets. During the period of famine, ideological indoctrination was used in order to maintain the regime at the cost of seriously aggravating hunger and starvation. This structure and these policies remain in place, which will lead to recurrence of mass starvation.
- Obstruction of humanitarian aid during 1990s famine: During the worst period of mass starvation, the State impeded the delivery of food aid by imposing conditions that were not based on humanitarian considerations. Concealment of information prevented the population from finding alternatives to the collapsing public distribution system. It also delayed international assistance that, provided earlier, could have saved many lives.
- Persistence of hunger and starvation after 2000: After the 1990s famine, food and basic supplies have continued to be in short supply. The government has curtailed market-based efforts for private citizens to find the food they need. These efforts included a botched currency reform aimed at undermining private enterprise and restoring the centrally planned economic system. This effectively resulted in eliminating the savings of many families and creating further starvation. At the same time, the Public Distribution System has failed to regain the level of subsidized services provided before 1990s collapse. Inflation has spiked making food unaffordable; in 20 years the price of rice has risen by a factor of 500. Poor government policy has been exacerbated by periodical floods that reduce agricultural yields. Deaths from starvation seem to have fallen since 2000, but they continue to occur and spike periodically. The Commission noted that organizations like the World Food Programme and World Health Organization report that large swathes of the population continue to suffer from critical food security; between 36% and 40% of the population suffer from malnutrition, with stunting among children remaining widespread.

==== Arbitrary detention, torture, executions, and prison camps ====
Overview: The State has established a highly centralized policy for the extreme persecution of political crimes, instilling fear to maintain the status quo. Torture is used to force confessions. Detainees are imprisoned without fair trial. The families of the political prison inmates never know again of the fate of the detained relative. Atrocities take place in prison camps, including intentional starvation, forced labor, executions, torture, and rape. Hundreds of thousands have died in these camps through the deliberate and systematic policy of the State. There currently are between 80,000 and 120,000 political prisoners.

Illustrations made by an escapee and published in the report. The author explains how the so-called 'pigeon torture' works. [Y]our hands are handcuffed behind your back. And then they hang you so you would not be able to stand or sit. (...)you can't stand, you can't sleep. If you are hung like that for three days, four days, you urinate, you defecate, you are totally dehydrated. … [the pigeon torture] was the most painful of all tortures… [it] was so painful that I felt it was better to die.

- Torture: Torture is an established feature of the interrogation process by State agencies, including the State Security Department (SSD), and the Ministry of People's Security (MPS). Suspects are systematically degraded, intimidated and tortured. The treatment of suspects is particularly brutal and inhumane in the interrogation detention centers of the SSD, the primary agency tasked with suppressing "anti-state and anti-people crimes". Many suspects die at interrogation detention centres as a result of torture, deliberate starvation or illnesses developed or aggravated by the terrible living conditions. After a suspect "confesses" to a serious political crime, the SSD tends to bypass the judiciary and send a person to a political prison camp. The reverse applies to the MPS; the more serious cases are disposed of through the judiciary, while the courts are often bypassed in less serious cases.

Map of the location of political prison camps (kwanliso) and ordinary prison camps (kyohwaso) in North Korea, issued by the Commission of Inquiry.

- Political prisoners: Political prisons are the harshest long-term punishment that can be inflicted to an individual in the DPRK, and are used as the means to remove from society those individuals and families that are seen as an irredeemable threat to the regime. As such, these inmates cease to be considered citizens with any rights. Persons accused of major political crimes become victims of enforced disappearance; they are detained and, if not executed immediately, brought without trial to political prison camps (kwanliso) and held incommunicado. Their families are never informed of their fate. The State uses this system to instill fear in the population. The inmate population has been gradually eliminated through deliberate starvation, forced labor, executions, torture, rape and the denial of reproductive rights. The Commission estimates that hundreds of thousands of political prisoners have perished in these camps over the past five decades, with atrocities that resemble the horrors of camps that totalitarian states established during the twentieth century. Between 80,000 and 120,000 people are believed to remain incarcerated. The DPRK has always denied the existence of this prison network.
- Ordinary prisons: These prisons (kyohwaso) are also referred to as reeducation camps, and are used for those people that the State deems could be reeducated and released back into society. These prisons include common criminals, but also many political prisoners. The vast majority of inmates are victims of arbitrary detention and imprisonment without due process and fair trial guarantees. Torture, rape, excessive forced labor, and other arbitrary cruelties at the hands of guards and fellow prisoners are widespread and committed with impunity. Prisoners are still recognized as citizens and retain some rights. Their incarceration terms are typically not for life, and family visits are possible.
- Executions: As a matter of State policy, the authorities carry out executions with or without trial. Often executions are performed publicly in central places, where the local population is mandated to attend. Almost every citizen of the DPRK has become a witness to an execution. During 1990s famine many victims were executed for economic crimes such as stealing food in order to survive. In many cases, the accused were summarily executed without trial. It was common that the victim's body was left at the execution site for a time, as a warning. The famine was a time of much arbitrary punishment in the DPRK. From 2000, after the social situation had somewhat improved and the state could ease the level of repression, fewer public executions were reported. Inmates of political and ordinary prison camps are particularly vulnerable to secret executions. Recent reports of executions included politically-motivated ones, as well as smugglers of escapees out of the country, and smugglers of foreign media into the country.
- Changes – Diminishing guilt by association: In the past, it was common for the authorities to send entire families to political prison camps for political crimes committed by close relatives (including forebears, to the third generation) on the basis of the principle of guilt by association. Such cases still occur but appear to be less frequent now than in past decades.

==== Abductions and enforced disappearances from other countries ====
Overview: Since 1950 the DPRK has engaged in the systematic abduction, denial of repatriation, and subsequent enforced disappearance of potentially over 200,000 persons from other countries. Most have been subject to the harshest living conditions in the country. Forceful abductions include ROK civilians who were used as laborers during and after the Korean War, followed for decades by selective continued abductions of Japanese, Koreans, and other foreign nationals to provide training to spy agents. The State has also retained by force ROK prisoners of war and ethnic Koreans from Japan who voluntarily migrated to the DPRK.

The detailed report exhibits a stamp which includes a secret message from a returnee from Japan to North Korea, warning other family members still in Japan to refrain from moving to North Korea. The author had written "We cannot leave the village. Older brother do not come. Mother says she wishes to see you. Tell our sister in Toyama also not to come. What Bunto's father said is correct."

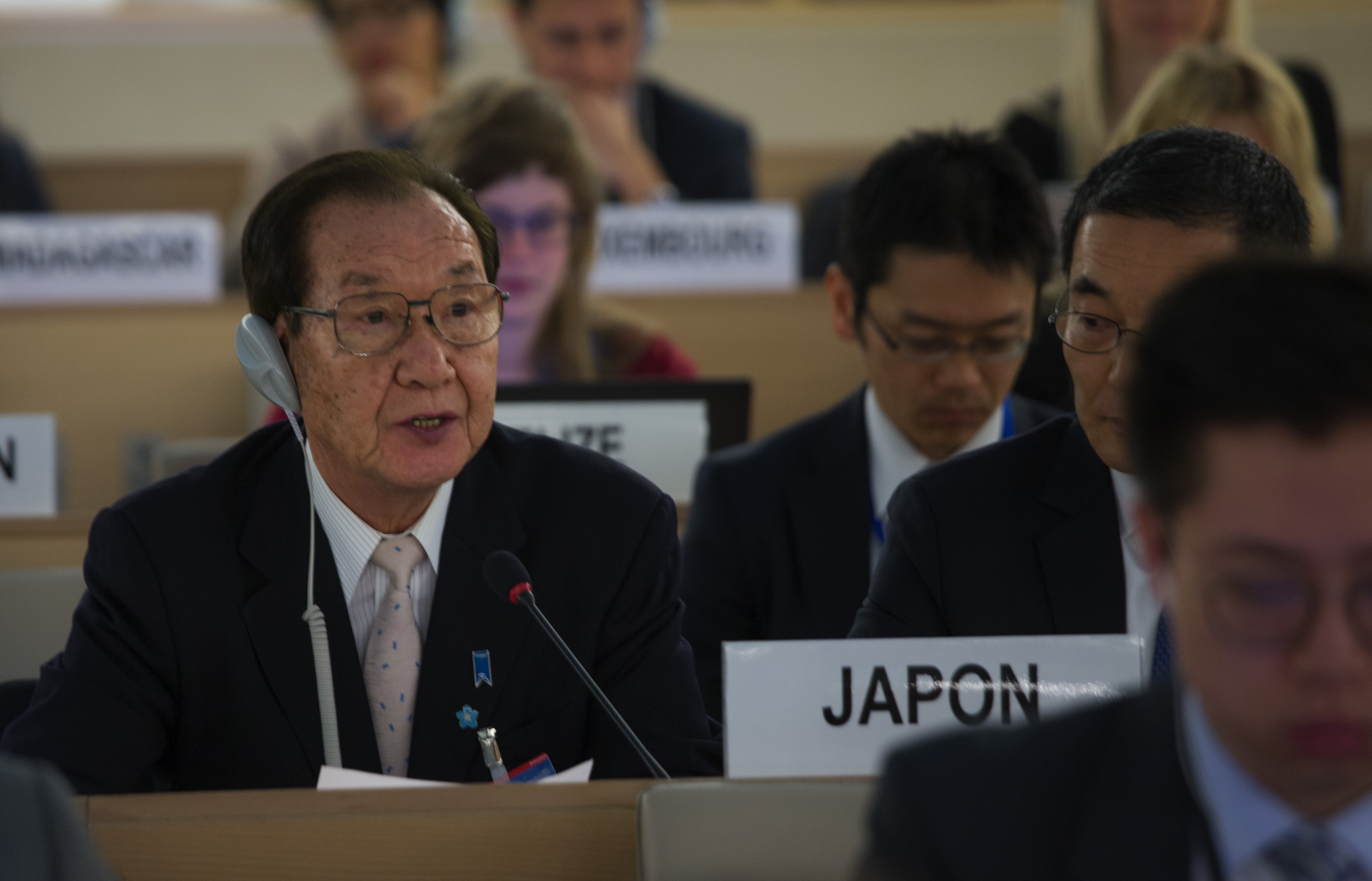
Shigeo Iizuka, Chairman of the Association of Families of Victims Kidnapped by North Korea gives his testimony at the UN.

- Korean War abductees: The DPRK experienced a loss of population and labor before the Korean War when landowners, intellectuals and religious people who felt threatened fled the country. During the war, more people were lost due to casualties. The government sought to resupply its labor force by systematically abducting 96,000 civilians from the South. The Korean Armistice required both sides to facilitate their return home. The North kept most of those abductees, assigning them to the lower social class (songbun), forcing upon them the worst kind of labor and life, and permanently severing any contact with their relatives in the South.
- Denial of repatriation to prisoners of war from the Korean War: At least 50,000 POWs from the ROK were not repatriated after the Armistice; 500 may still be alive as of 2014. The two sides had committed to repatriate their POWs, but the DPRK falsified its numbers, covertly retaining most of them. They were used as forced labor, typically in coal mines, with frequent dangerous incidents such as explosions tearing off limbs or flesh, collapses in the mines engulfing workers, and deaths resulting from crushing or cutting by machinery.
- 1955–1992: Post-war abduction and enforced disappearance of ROK citizens: Approximately 3,835 ROK citizens have been abducted by the DPRK since the end of the Korean War. Most were returned to the ROK within one and a half years, but 516 remain disappeared. Abductees were selected to be trained as spies or to be ideologically trained and later work in factories. The abductions were typically carried out by fishing boats but also through other means like the hijacking of an airplane.
  - The ROK has not been willing to raise the issue with the DPRK, thinking of the abductions in political rather than humanitarian terms. During the years of authoritarian rule in the ROK (1963–1988), relatives of abductees were suspected to be deserters and were subjected to surveillance, discrimination, and instances of torture. Democratic reforms in the ROK allowed for moral and economic restitution to these citizens.
- 1959–1984: Enforced disappearance of voluntary migrants to the DPRK: 93,340 (mostly ethnic Koreans) living abroad (primarily in Japan) decided to establish themselves in the DPRK, attracted by a "Paradise on Earth" or the "Return to Paradise" propaganda campaign. Upon arrival, they encountered a far worse reality. Decisions of where to live and work, what to eat, and whom to speak to and how were dictated to them. They were placed under strict surveillance and assigned to the lower social classes. Secret correspondence to relatives still in Japan warned them to refrain from relocating to the DPRK.
- 1970s–1980s: abduction of Japanese and other nationals: Dozens or even hundreds of Japanese and other foreigners are suspected to have been abducted by the DPRK. The DPRK has acknowledged the abduction of 14 persons and returned 5. Abductions were typically carried out by disguised fishermen boats. The abductees were taken to further espionage and terrorist activities by, for example, giving language training to agents who would later bomb an airliner. Some abductions were carried out to provide wives to other foreigners (usually other abductees). No Korean wives were given in order to avoid mixed-race offspring that would tarnish the purity of the Korean race.
- 1990s–present (2014): abductions from China: In reaction to the movement of large numbers of citizens to China that started in the 1990s, operatives of the DPRK's State Security Department have carried out highly organized abductions in China. Victims include escapees who might reveal sensitive information and nationals of China and the ROK who help DPRK escapees.

=== Crimes against humanity ===
The report stated that crimes against humanity in North Korea do "not have any parallel in the contemporary world" and arise directly out of "policies established at the highest level of State."

These crimes against humanity entail extermination, murder, enslavement, torture, imprisonment, rape, forced abortions and other sexual violence, persecution on political, religious, racial and gender grounds, the forcible transfer of populations, the enforced disappearance of persons and the inhumane act of knowingly causing prolonged starvation. The Commission further found that crimes against humanity are ongoing in the DPRK because the policies, institutions and patterns of impunity that lie at their heart remain in place.

— Report of the commission of inquiry on human rights in the Democratic People's Republic of Korea, paragraph 76.

The report was the first one by the United Nations to determine that crimes against humanity were perpetrated in the DPRK. Talking about these crimes, the Chair of the COI stated: "Unlike earlier totalitarian states and oppressive conduct, the world cannot now lament, 'if only we had known...' Now, the world does know. And the question is whether the world will respond effectively and take the necessary action."

==== The question of genocide ====
According to the Commission's findings, hundreds of thousands of inmates have been exterminated in political prison camps and other places over a span of more than five decades. In the course of three generations, entire groups of people, including families with their children, have perished in the prison camps because of who they were and not for what they had personally done.

The Commission noted that the notion of the DPRK eliminating an entire class of people by deliberately creating the conditions that lead to massive deaths can be seen as akin to genocide.

However, extermination on the sole basis of political affiliations is not included in the contemporary definition of genocide under international law. The Commission decided instead to emphasize that crimes against humanity, in their own right, are crimes of such gravity that they trigger not only the responsibility of the state concerned, but also that of the international community to protect the population of the DPRK.

==== Accountability ====
The prohibition of crimes against humanity forms part of the body of peremptory norms (jus cogens) that bind the entire international community as a matter of customary international law. Individuals who commit crimes against humanity in the DPRK may, therefore, be held responsible, even though the DPRK has not yet included crimes against humanity in its domestic criminal law and is not a State party to the Rome Statute of the International Criminal Court. The fact that perpetrators of these crimes have acted on superior orders does not relieve them of criminal responsibility.

The Commission's report identified individuals and institutions that must be held accountable, including the Supreme Leader, State Security Department, Ministry of People's Security, Office of the Prosecutor and the court system, Korean People's Army, Workers' Party of Korea, and the National Defence Commission.

The COI recommended the international community act, outlining three main options:

- The Security Council could refer the situation to the International Criminal Court
- The Security Council could set up an ad hoc international tribunal (akin to the tribunals for Yugoslavia and Rwanda)
- If the UNSC failed to pass a resolution, then the General Assembly could establish a tribunal, relying on its residual powers recognized inter alia in the Uniting for Peace resolution.

== Methodology and challenges ==
External videos
- Excerpts from the Public Hearings of the Commission of Inquiry (23mins) Testimony on human rights violations, from hearings in Seoul, Tokyo, London and Washington (UN Web TV)

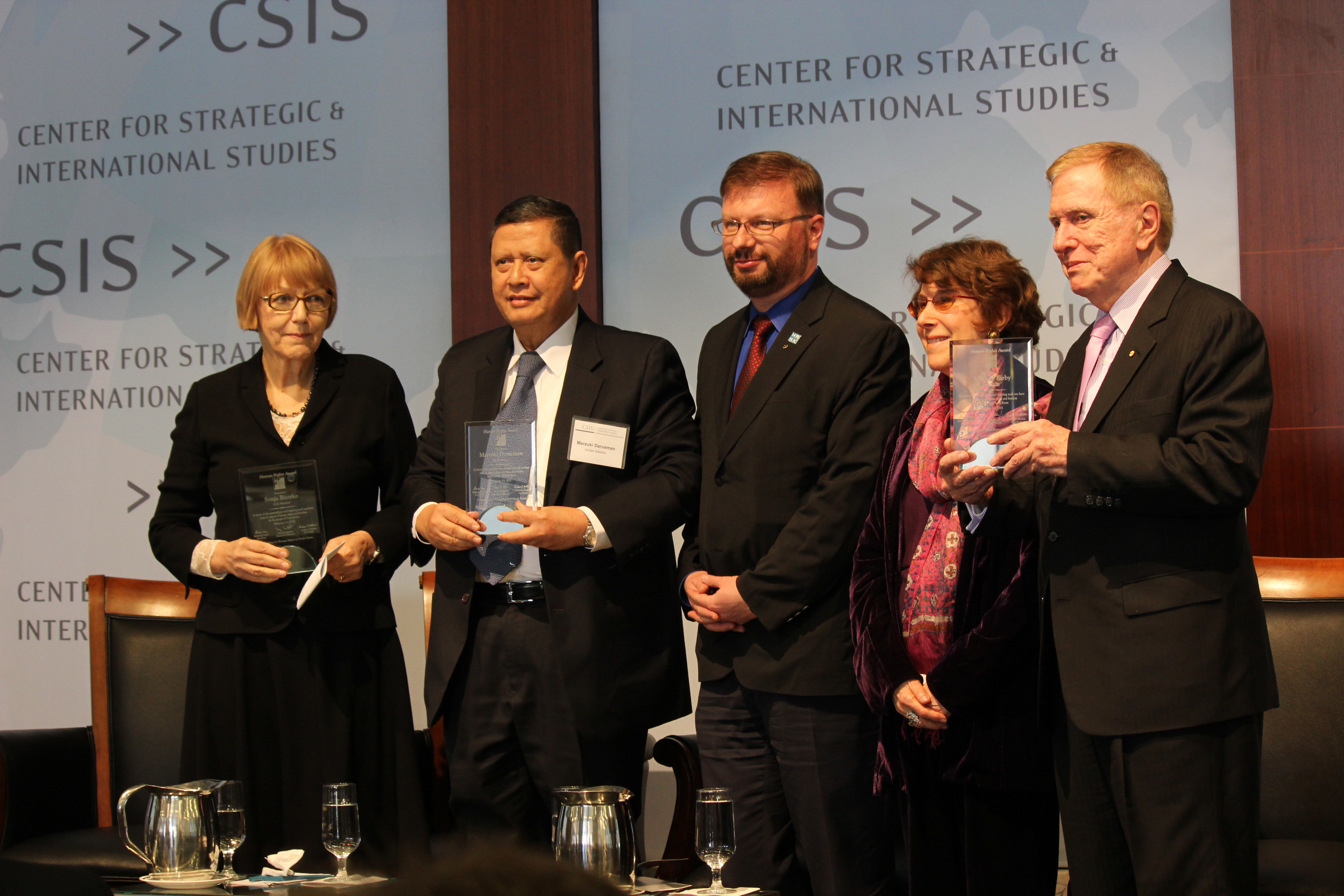
The three UN COI commissioners receive a Human Rights Award from the U.S. Committee for Human Rights in North Korea, presented by the organization's Co-Chair Roberta Cohen and Executive Director Greg Scarlatoiu

The panel conducted its investigations throughout several months, relying on first-hand witnesses and victims as the primary source of information. Eighty escapees, refugees, and abductees publicly testified, and 240 more were interviewed confidentially to protect them or their families from retaliation by North Korea. Interviews were conducted during visits to Seoul, Tokyo, Bangkok, London, and Washington, D.C., and through videoconferences and telephone calls. A wealth of other reports and written materials prepared by the UN, NGOs, governments, research institutes, and academics were used for context and corroboration. Historical official documents released from former Soviet countries (including archival records from the USSR) and leaked records from China and DPRK also fed into the commission's research. The Commission also relied on commercially available satellite images of prison camps, as well as clandestinely recorded videos and photographs with confirmed authenticity.

The Commission stated in its report its awareness that most victims and witnesses cooperating with the Commission had an overall unfavorable opinion of the DPRK's authorities. To ensure balance, the Commission repeatedly invited the DPRK to provide information, but it always refused. In the absence of direct input by the DPRK, the commission reviewed documentation previously published by the DPRK. The report also noted that Chinese leaders refused to let the commission visit China's border provinces with North Korea and opposed the Commission's inquiry from the start. The Commission sent a letter to the Chinese government suggesting that they were "aiding and abetting crimes against humanity."

The determination of facts was based on the "reasonable grounds" standard of proof, with all facts independently corroborated by at least one other credible source of information.

The Commission relied chiefly on the binding legal obligations that the country voluntarily assumed as a State party to the: International Covenant on Civil and Political Rights; International Covenant on Economic, Social and Cultural Rights; Convention on the Rights of the Child; and Convention on the Elimination of All Forms of Discrimination against Women. The Commission also relied on other international and customary law, including international humanitarian law.

== North Korea's reactions ==
After the adoption of HRC resolution 22/13, the DPRK publicly stated that it would "totally reject and disregard" the resolution, which it considered to be a "product of political confrontation and conspiracy". Immediately after the Commission was created, the North Korean Ambassador to the UN, So Se Pyong, denounced the Commission as "an instrument that serves the political purposes of the hostile forces in their attempt to discredit the image" of North Korea, while denying that any human rights abuses existed in his country.

The panel submitted several requests seeking the cooperation of North Korea. The Commission invited the government to scrutinize its work, share information, and provide proof to support its claim that human rights are protected. One request included sending a letter to the country's leader Kim Jong Un. All requests were denied or went unanswered. North Korea's blanket rejection also included denying access to the country (since 2004 the Special Rapporteur had also been denied entry).

Throughout the process, North Korean officials dismissed the Commission, describing it and its results as "a political conspiracy by the United States and hostile forces," with its participating witnesses being criminals and "human scum." The DPRK asserted that the evidence cited by the panel had been "fabricated and invented," and dismissed the Commission as "a hotbed of confrontation and distrust."

North Korean officials stated that there were "no prison camps" operating in North Korea but that there were "detention centres where people are improved through their mentality and look on their wrongdoings." Officials also stated that North Korea was a "transition society" and as such "there might be some problems, for example in the economic and other areas, we may need to establish more houses and social facilities in order to provide people with better living conditions."

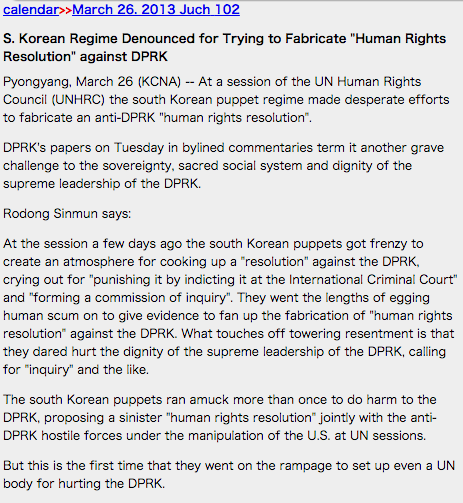
A fragment of another news piece published by the Korean Central News Agency protesting the Commission of Inquiry

Several months after the release of the panel's report, North Korea released its own human rights report. The five-chapter report was prepared by the DPRK's Association for Human Rights Studies "to lay bare the false and reactionary nature of the reckless anti-North Korean human rights racket and to wipe out the prejudice and misunderstanding." The report claims that North Koreans enjoy robust human rights, including freedom of speech and religion and protection from slavery and torture. The report did not mention the prison gulags, which witnesses to the Commission had described in detail.

North Korea also countered accusation of wrongdoing by issuing its own analysis on the human rights situation in the United States and South Korea.

Shortly after the publication of the COI report, the pressure on the DPRK mounted. The UN General Assembly considered passing a resolution that threatened to bring the leadership of the DPRK to an international tribunal. Also, several governments were reassessing their relationships to the country given the findings of the report and reduced their shipments of aid.

This pressure during mid and late 2014 led North Korea to change its stance, with its Foreign Minister going to the General Assembly for the first time in 15 years. There he announced the DPRK's readiness to hold a "human rights dialogue with countries not hostile to it." Also following the publication of the COI report, in May 2014, on the eve of the second Universal Periodic Review report on human rights in North Korea, the DPRK published (three years behind the UN scheduled deadline) a detailed response to the 167 first cycle recommendations. The government changed its previous stance of complete rejection of external critique on its human rights, accepting a large part of the recommendations and claiming they were being implemented. Shortly after, during the second cycle of the UPR, 268 recommendations were issued to advance the DPRK's human rights. The DPRK again accepted some of them. However, in both instances, it excluded from consideration or redress the most serious violations, including those deemed by the COI to have crossed "the high threshold of crimes against humanity."

Despite the DPRK's claims of progress, in June 2014, Special Rapporteur Darusman noted that no recommendations were being implemented.

After the UN General Assembly in December 2014 referred the Commission's findings to the Security Council, Pyongyang renounced any further cooperation with UN human rights mechanisms.

== Other subsequent events ==
The UN Human Rights Council renewed the mandate of the Special Rapporteur in 2014. The vote allowed Darusman to pick up where the Commission left off a month prior. It also called on the Office of the High Commissioner for Human Rights to establish a "field presence" in the country by assigning permanent staff to monitor human rights developments. The office was opened on 23 June 2015. The DPRK reacted by strongly protesting the establishment of such office, and threatening the UN staff there to be "ruthlessly punished".

In January 2015, Shin Dong-hyuk, a vocal and prominent defector, recanted key parts of a life story that had made him the best-known symbol of torture and other rights violations by North Korea. His retractions came amid mounting pressure from fellow North Korean escapees and the South Korean news media to clarify suspicions about his background. The UN and human rights advocates maintained that the report remained solid, even without Shin's account as the report drew from interviews with hundreds of other defectors and experts on human rights in North Korea. Before Shin's recantation, in 2013, The New York Times had noted that Shin's accounts were "dramatic, but not particularly new; over the years, defectors from North Korea, including a handful of survivors of its prison camps like Mr. Shin, have told similar stories."

In 2016, British scholar, Hazel Smith, called the report's description of ongoing malnutrition in North Korea as "erroneous". She stated that the situation had greatly improved since the 1990s and was far from being unique around the world. Despite Hazel's characterization that the report concluded that "nothing much has changed since the famine years", the report made emphasis on the 1990's famine and deaths caused by it, but considered it to have ended, noting that the conditions had changed since then. (Note: The COI report in paragraph 692 says "While conditions have changed since the 1990s, hunger and malnutrition continue to be widespread. Deaths from starvation continue to be reported. The Commission is concerned that structural issues, including laws and policies that violate the right to adequate food and freedom from hunger remain in place which could lead to the recurrence of mass starvation." And paragraph 675 says "The Commission is concerned that, although a number of factors have evolved since the 1990s, other elements aggravating or creating starvation, which are within state control, remain in place. These elements may cause the recurrence of famine and mass starvation in the country.") It also warned that malnutrition remained a significant concern, especially for the disfavored social classes and children. It also said that the authoritarian nature of the regime could lead to another famine in the future. Other scholars and observers including Sung-Yoon Lee, Bradley Martin, and Andrei Lankov, came to conclusions more comparable to those found in the COI report.

In 2023 and 2024 authors, experts, and governments commemorated the 10th anniversary of beginning of the commission of inquiry, and the publication of its report. The report continued to be regarded as a landmark document, the most exhaustive to date, with its findings remaining relevant and most of its recommendations remaining unheeded.

== UN documents ==
Commission's report

The COI issued two versions of the report: a summary one of 36 pages and a detailed one of 372 pages.

- Human Rights Council Session 25 Agenda item 4. Report of the commission of inquiry on human rights in the Democratic People's Republic of Korea A/HRC/25/63 7 February 2014.
- Human Rights Council Session 25 Conference room paper 1. Report of the detailed findings of the commission of inquiry on human rights in the Democratic People’s Republic of Korea A/HRC/25/CRP.1 7 February 2014..

Related resolutions

- Human Rights Council Session 22 Resolution 13. 48. Situation of human rights in the Democratic People's Republic of Korea A/HRC/RES/22/13 21 March 2013. (The Human Rights Council resolution on the DPRK establishing a commission of inquiry for one year)
- Human Rights Council Session 25 Limited distribution 17. Situation of human rights in the Democratic People's Republic of Korea A/HRC/25/L.17 26 March 2014. (Recommends that the General Assembly submit the report of the commission of inquiry to the Security Council for its consideration, including consideration of referral to the appropriate international criminal justice mechanism)
- United Nations General Assembly Session 69 Resolution 188. 73. Situation of human rights in the Democratic People's Republic of Korea A/RES/69/188 18 December 2014. (The General Assembly called on the Security Council to consider the recommendations of the Commission of Inquiry established by the Human Rights Council, including an ICC referral.)

Security Council Meetings

- United Nations Security Council Session 7353 Meeting The situation in the Democratic People's Republic of Korea S/PV.7353 22 December 2014.
- United Nations Security Council Session 7575 Meeting The situation in the Democratic People's Republic of Korea S/PV.7575 10 December 2015.
- United Nations Security Council Session 7830 Meeting The situation in the Democratic People's Republic of Korea S/PV.7830 9 December 2016.
- United Nations Security Council Session 8130 Meeting The situation in the Democratic People's Republic of Korea S/PV.8130 11 December 2017.

The United Nations has issued, and continues to issue other (less in-depth) periodical reports on the human rights situation in the DPRK. Below are listed the reports that preceded or were contemporaneous to the Commission's report. These include the Universal Periodic Review (every 3 or 4 years) and annual reports by the Special Rapporteur, issued in detail to the Human Rights Council, and in a more condensed form to the General Assembly:

Universal Periodic Review reports by the Human Rights Council
- Human Rights Council Session 13th Document Report of the Working Group on the Universal Periodic Review – Democratic People's Republic of Korea A/HRC/13/13 4 January 2010.
- Human Rights Council Session 27th Document Report of the Working Group on the Universal Periodic Review – Democratic People's Republic of Korea A/HRC/27/10 2 July 2014.
Special Rapporteur annual reports to the Human Rights Council
- Human Rights Council Session 4th Document Report of the Special Rapporteur on the situation of human rightsin the Democratic People's Republic of Korea, Vitit Muntarbhorn A/HRC/4/15 7 February 2007.
- Human Rights Council Session 7th Document Report of the Special Rapporteur on the situation of human rightsin the Democratic People's Republic of Korea, Vitit Muntarbhorn A/HRC/7/20 15 February 2008.
- Human Rights Council Session 10th Document Report of the Special Rapporteur on the situation of human rights in the Democratic People's Republic of Korea, Marzuki Darusman A/HRC/10/18 24 February 2009.
- Human Rights Council Session 16th Document Report of the Special Rapporteur on the situation of human rights in the Democratic People's Republic of Korea A/HRC/16/58 21 February 2011.
- Human Rights Council Session 19th Document Report of the Special Rapporteur on the situation of human rights in the Democratic People's Republic of Korea A/HRC/19/65 13 February 2012.
- Human Rights Council Session 22nd Document Report of the Special Rapporteur on the situation of human rights in the Democratic People's Republic of Korea, Marzuki Darusman A/HRC/22/57 1 February 2013.
- Human Rights Council Session 26th Document Report of the Special Rapporteur on the situation of human rights in the Democratic People's Republic of Korea, Marzuki Darusman A/HRC/26/43 13 June 2014.
Special Rapporteur annual reports to the General Assembly
- United Nations General Assembly Session 60th Document Situation of human rights in the Democratic People's Republic of Korea A/60/306 29 August 2005.
- United Nations General Assembly Session 61st Document Situation of human rights in the Democratic People's Republic of Korea A/61/349 15 September 2006.
- United Nations General Assembly Session 62nd Document Situation of human rights in the Democratic People's Republic of Korea A/62/264 15 August 2007.
- United Nations General Assembly Session 64th Document Situation of human rights in the Democratic People's Republic of Korea A/64/224 4 August 2009.
- United Nations General Assembly Session 65th Document Situation of human rights in the Democratic People's Republic of Korea A/65/364 14 September 2010.
- United Nations General Assembly Session 66th Document Situation of human rights in the Democratic People's Republic of Korea A/66/322 24 August 2011.
- United Nations General Assembly Session 68th Document Situation of human rights in the Democratic People's Republic of Korea A/68/319 14 August 2013.

== See also ==
- United Nations fact-finding mission
