= Michael Kirby (judge) =

Australian jurist and academic

The Honourable Michael Kirby AC CMG
- Michael Kirby in September 2026

Justice of the High Court of Australia
- In office 6 February 1996 – 2 February 2009
- Appointed by: Bill Hayden on the advice of Paul Keating
- Preceded by: Sir William Deane
- Succeeded by: Virginia Bell

Chancellor of Macquarie University
- In office 1984–1993
- Preceded by: Percy Partridge
- Succeeded by: Tim Besley

President of the University of Sydney Students' Representative Council
- In office 1962–1963
- Preceded by: John Boyd
- Succeeded by: Bob McDonald

Personal details
- Born: Michael Donald Kirby; 18 March 1939 (age 87) Sydney, New South Wales, Australia
- Spouse: Johan van Vloten (m. 2019)
- Education: University of Sydney
- Occupation: Arbitrator, Mediator, UN Official

Michael Donald Kirby (born 18 March 1939) is an Australian jurist and academic who is a former Justice of the High Court of Australia, serving from 1996 to 2009. He has remained active in retirement; in May 2013 he was appointed by the United Nations Human Rights Council to lead an inquiry into human rights abuses in North Korea, which reported in February 2014.

== Early life and education ==
Michael Donald Kirby was born on 18 March 1939 at Crown Street Women's Hospital to Donald and Jean Langmore (née Knowles) Kirby. He was the eldest of five siblings, followed by twins Donald William and David Charles (the latter died at 18 months from pneumonia), David, and Diana Margaret. In 1943 his grandmother, Norma Gray, remarried and her second husband was Jack Simpson, National Treasurer of the Australian Communist Party. Although Kirby came to admire Simpson, neither he nor his immediate family embraced the ideology. His father supported the Australian Labor Party but never became a member. His mother, it is believed, voted for Robert Menzies (Liberal Party).

Kirby attended state schools, commencing at North Strathfield Public School, followed by Summer Hill Public School for Opportunity Classes, and then Fort Street High School (at that time Fort Street Boys High School) in Sydney.

After graduating from high school, Kirby later attended the University of Sydney, where he earned a Bachelor of Arts (1959), Bachelor of Laws (1962), Bachelor of Economics (1965), and Master of Laws (First-Class Honours) (1967). At university, Kirby was elected President of the University of Sydney Students' Representative Council (1962–1963) and President of the University of Sydney Union (1965).

== Career ==
Kirby commenced his legal career as an articled clerk for Ramon Burke at the small Sydney firm M. A. Simon and Co., assisting with Compensation Commission cases for plaintiffs. The firm had two principals, Maurice Arthur Simon and Ramon Burke, later a judge of the Compensation Court of New South Wales. After graduation, he moved to Hickson, Lakeman and Holcombe (now Hicksons Lawyers) as a solicitor, practising in insurance litigation and property disputes. He was a partner of the firm from 1963 to 1967.

Kirby was admitted to the New South Wales Bar in 1967.

=== Judicial appointment ===
Kirby became the youngest man appointed to federal judicial office in 1975, when he was appointed Deputy President of the Australian Conciliation and Arbitration Commission, a tribunal which adjudicated labour disputes. In 1983, Kirby was appointed a judge in the Federal Court of Australia, before an appointment as President of the New South Wales Court of Appeal, a superior court in that state's legal system, in 1984. During that period, he was also the President of the Court of Appeal of Solomon Islands from 1995 to 1996. In February 1996, Kirby was appointed to the High Court of Australia.

Kirby retired from the High Court on 2 February 2009, shortly before reaching the constitutionally mandatory retirement age of 70, and was succeeded by Virginia Bell.

=== High Court dissent rate ===
Kirby was often at odds with his colleagues in the Gleeson High Court, and sometimes as the sole dissenter. In 2004, he delivered a dissenting opinion on nearly 40% of the matters in which he participated, almost twice as many as any of his High Court colleagues; in constitutional cases, his rate of dissent was more than 50%. His notable dissent rate earned him the nickname the "Great Dissenter". Later High Court Justices with significant dissent rates include Dyson Heydon and Patrick Keane, though neither had dissent rates as high as Kirby's.

Legal researchers Andrew Lynch and George Williams observe that "even allowing for 2004 as a year in which Kirby had a particularly high level of explicit disagreement with a majority of his colleagues, it is neither premature nor unfair to say that in the frequency of his dissent, his Honour has long since eclipsed any other Justice in the history of the Court... [Kirby] has broken away to claim a position of outsider on the Court which seems unlikely to pass with future years".

Kirby has responded, stating that "on their own, statistics tell little"; to understand Kirby's rate of dissent, it is necessary to examine what his disagreements have been about and consider whom he has dissented from. Kirby explains "there have always been divisions, reflecting the different philosophies and perspectives of the office-holders", and that, throughout the High Court's history, many dissenting opinions have ultimately been adopted as good law. Further, Kirby argues that the rate of dissent, if seen within its context, is relatively small. Cases heard before the full bench of the High Court have proceeded through a series of lower courts and special leave hearings. They are thus likely to test the boundaries of the existing law, and raise opposing, though no less valid, views of the law.

== Jurisprudence ==
In November 2003, at the University of Exeter, Kirby delivered the Hamlyn Lectures on the subject of judicial activism. Rejecting the doctrine of strict constructionism, Kirby declared that:

Clearly it would be wrong for a judge to set out in pursuit of a personal policy agenda and hang the law. Yet it would also be wrong, and futile, for a judge to pretend that the solutions to all of the complex problems of the law today, unresolved by incontestably clear and applicable texts, can be answered by the application of nothing more than purely verbal reasoning and strict logic to words written by judges in earlier times about the problems they then faced... contrary to myth, judges do more than simply apply law. They have a role in making it and always have.

These lectures sparked a debate in the Australian media, echoing an ongoing debate in the United States, as to whether judges have the right to interpret the law in the light of its intent and considerations of natural law or whether judges should (or can) simply follow the letter of the law, leaving questions of its intent and underlying principles to elected representatives.

Following increasing public scrutiny into, and characterisations of, High Court judgments as 'activist' in the late 1990s, a number of members of the Court agreed to give interviews in the 1998 documentary film The Highest Court. Kirby was one of the few members of the Court who did not take part. An insight into Kirby's jurisprudence and judicial style can be found in his engagement with Gavin Griffith QC in Kruger v Commonwealth, which is featured in the documentary.

He had also addressed this topic in a 1997 speech to the Bar Association of India, in which he spoke approvingly of "a kind of 'judicial activism' that is often in tune with the deeply felt emotions of ordinary citizens". Nonetheless, Kirby is critical of the term "judicial activism" when it is used as "code language", applied chiefly by conservative commentators to views and to people with which they disagree.

== UN Report into North Korean Human Rights Abuses ==
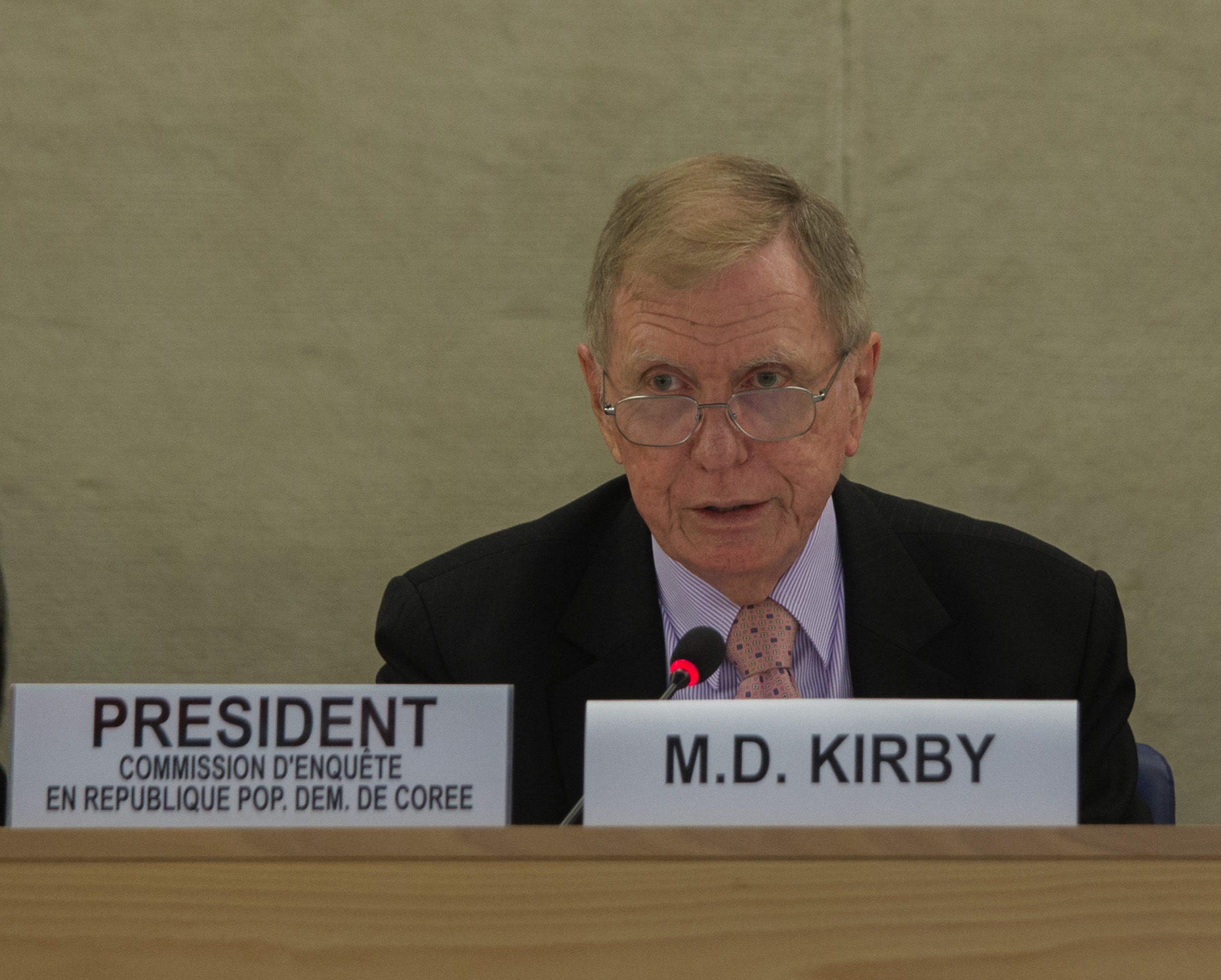
The commission of inquiry presided over by Kirby recommended that North Korean leadership be prosecuted for human rights violations.

In May 2013, the United Nations Human Rights Council appointed Kirby to lead a commission of inquiry into human rights abuses in North Korea, with Sonja Biserko and Marzuki Darusman. The report is dated 7 February 2014. It identifies "[s]ystematic, widespread and gross human rights violations" by a "totalitarian state", including "unspeakable atrocities" in the political prison camps. It makes many recommendations for internal reform and international action, including prosecution of the North Korean leadership in the International Criminal Court or before an ad hoc international tribunal. North Korea refused all co-operation with the inquiry and, just before the report was launched, issued a statement claiming that it was based upon "faked" material.

As the report was being finalised, on 20 January 2014 Kirby wrote to North Korea's Supreme Leader, Kim Jong-un, informing him that he would be advising the United Nations to formally refer the situation in North Korea to the International Criminal Court, where Kim could be tried for his personal culpability as head of state and leader of the military, but proposing that the commission come to Pyongyang to discuss the issues with the North Korean government. At a press conference to launch the report, on 17 February 2014, Kirby said that there were "many parallels" between the evidence he had heard and crimes committed by the Nazis and their allies in the Second World War. On 22 April 2014 the official news agency of North Korea, KCNA, claimed that the "fabrications" are meant to "undermine the ideology and social system of the DPRK". The KCNA also criticised Kirby for being gay: "it is ridiculous for such gay [sic] to sponsor dealing with others' human rights issue".

Kirby remained involved in advocacy on issues of human rights in North Korea and the abduction of Japanese citizens, participating in symposia organised by the Japanese government in Geneva (September 2014) with a UN Human Rights Council Panel and in Tokyo (December 2015). In May 2017, he was awarded the Order of the Rising Sun, Gold and Silver Star, "in recognition of his contribution to promoting understanding of the situation of Human Rights in North Korea in the international society including the issue of the abductions of Japanese nationals". The honour was presented by Japanese Prime Minister Shinzō Abe and Kirby received the additional honour of an audience with Akihito, the Emperor of Japan, at the Imperial Palace in Tokyo. Kirby described the awarding of the honour to himself and former United Nations special rapporteur Marzuki Darusman as "a clear signal that the Japanese Government has not abandoned its determination to pursue the crime against humanity involved in the abductions in the international community and other crimes revealed in our report".

In January 2015, one of the key witnesses to Kirby's inquiry, Shin Dong Hyuk, admitted that he had given false testimony. Having sworn that he had spent his childhood entirely in the notorious Camp 14, he changed his story to say that he had been transferred at the age of six to the nearby Camp 18. He said that he had changed his story after seeing his father (whom he had thought to be dead) on television. Shin apologised but gave few details.

== Public life ==
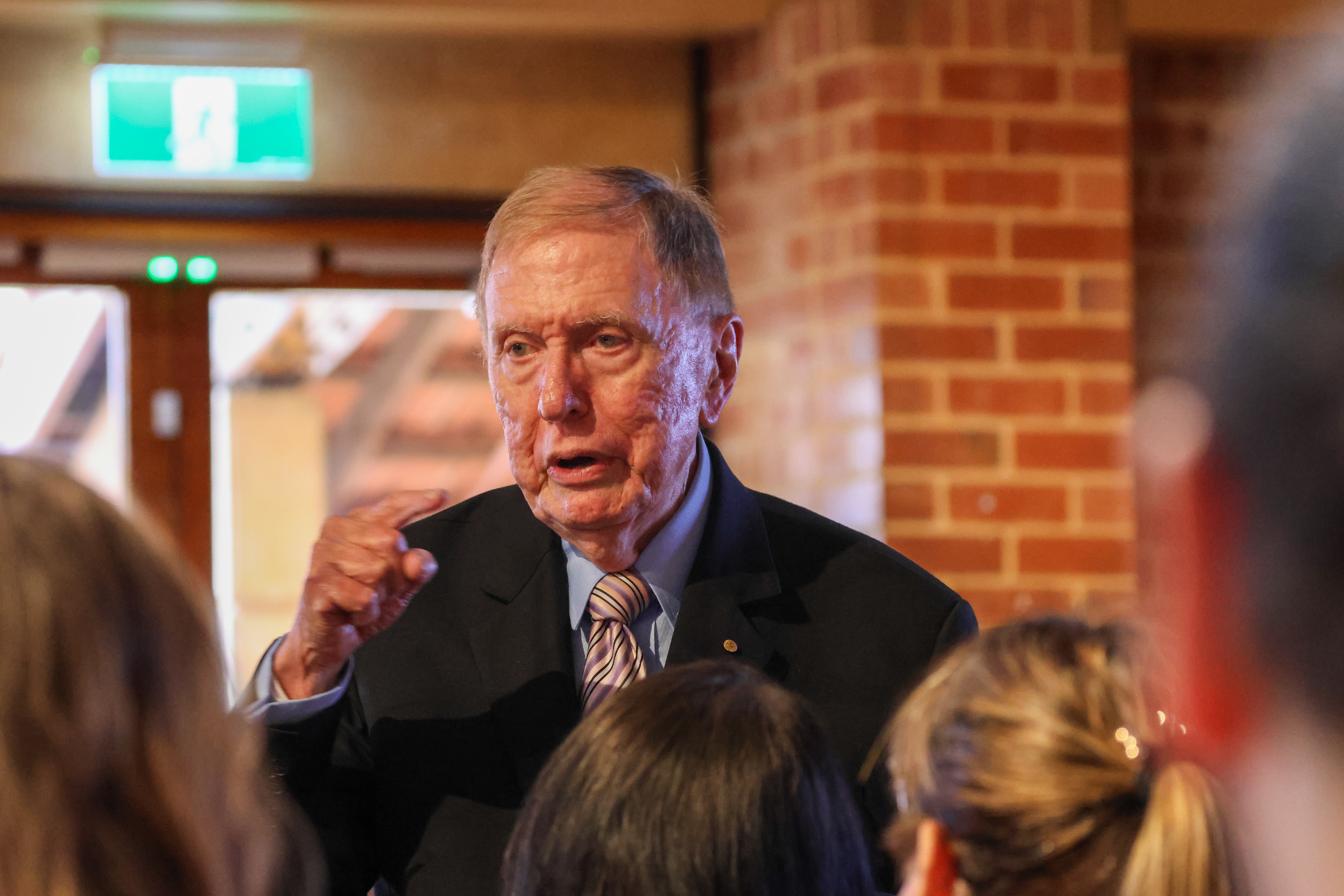
Kirby delivering a lecture at Union House at the Adelaide University, on 22 May 2026

From 1984 until 1993, Kirby held the position of Chancellor at Macquarie University.

He has served on many other boards and committees, notably the Australian Law Reform Commission (ALRC) and the CSIRO. He is Patron of the Friends of Libraries Australia (FOLA) and many other bodies.

After his retirement from the High Court, Kirby was appointed to several honorary academic roles at Australian universities. These included appointments to: the Australian National University (ANU) in Canberra, as distinguished visiting fellow in February 2009; the University of New South Wales Faculty of Law as visiting professorial fellow in March 2009; the University of Tasmania Faculty of Law as adjunct professor in July 2009; and Victoria University as an adjunct professor. He has been appointed honorary visiting professor by 12 universities.

Kirby was among the founders of Australians for Constitutional Monarchy, an organisation which played a prominent part in the 1999 republic referendum.

Kirby has a reputation as an eloquent and powerful orator, having given a vast number of speeches over his career on a diverse range of topics.

The annual Michael Kirby Lecture and Dinner has been conducted by the Faculty of Law and Justice, Southern Cross University, since 2007.

Kirby is a fellow of the Hastings Center, an independent bioethics research institution in the United States. In 2006, he was elected an Honorary Bencher of the Inner Temple in London. In the same year, the Australian Academy of the Humanities elected him an Honorary Fellow.

In July 2009, Kirby accepted a position as adjunct professor in law at the University of Tasmania Faculty of Law. He is also the (founding) Chairman of the Editorial Board of the Journal of Law, Information & Science, which is published by that faculty; a position he has held since 1981.

Since 2010, Kirby has been one of the 11 members of the Eminent Persons Group set up to advise on reform of the Commonwealth of Nations.

In 2011, Kirby suggested that "There is nothing so powerful in the world as an idea whose time has come, and animal protection is just such an idea", becoming a patron of Voiceless, an animal protection institute.

Kirby is an avid supporter of the arts. He has appeared in the University of Queensland Law Revue twice since 2004. In May 2007, he appeared in Melbourne alongside hip-hop impresario Elf Tranzporter at the launch of Victorian Arts Law Week, performing a rap of W. B. Yeats's poetry.

== Personal life ==
Kirby has been openly gay since around 1984. He has lived since 1969 with Johan van Vloten, who migrated to Australia from the Netherlands in 1963, and in 1999 Kirby listed him as his long-term partner in Who's Who in Australia. Van Vloten helped people living with HIV and Kirby became involved in the issue both within Australia and internationally. Kirby has often spoken publicly in support of gay rights. While President of the International Commission of Jurists he encouraged that organisation to give more consideration to human sexuality as an aspect of human rights, and as an Anglican he has expressed disappointment at his church's stance on gay rights. In 2002, at the Sydney Gay Games VI, Kirby was the keynote speaker at the opening ceremony. "The movement for equality is unstoppable. Its message will eventually reach the four corners of the world," he told a crowd of 35,000. In 2006, he attended the International Conference on LGBT Human Rights in Montreal, presiding over the Asia-Pacific Plenary.

Kirby is religious, describing himself as a "Protestant Anglican Christian" and criticising clerical opposition to homosexuality: "I don't want any old gent in frocks to take my religion from me and to me it is still an important aspect of my life". In November 2007, he accused the Anglican and Catholic archbishops of Sydney—Peter Jensen and George Pell, respectively—of hindering the acceptance of gay people in Australian society, stating that homophobia was "reinforced even to this day by religious instruction, and it has to be said, religious instruction from the two archbishops of Sydney". Kirby also expressed disappointment in his "minority of one" status among his High Court of Australia colleagues, and conceded that "some of the justices perhaps have less liberal views than I have".

Kirby was selected by readers of samesame.com.au as one of the 25 most influential gay or lesbian Australians in every year that this list was published, from 2007 to 2010.

Kirby's memoir, A Private Life, subtitled "fragments, memories, friends", was published by Allen & Unwin in 2011. About the memoir in The Sydney Morning Herald, Michael Kirby's brother David Kirby AM, in the context of the 2017 Australian Marriage Law Postal Survey, noted that "the message he received from his early teens was that his secret should be the source of deep shame"... "He abandoned any thought of politics".

Kirby and van Vloten married on 11 February 2019, the 50th anniversary of their first meeting.

=== Family ===
Kirby's father, Donald, was the only child of Alma Caroline (Norma) Grey, a single working mother of English–Irish descent. Norma became pregnant at 15 with Donald Kirby while in a relationship with a then-17-year-old Victor Kirby, a Catholic who had arrived after the Great Famine. Norma's parents were John Emmanuel Gray, an English brick- and boiler- maker and Annie Lyons. Annie's father, Harry Lyons, had emigrated from Dublin to Sydney in the 1850s, following the Great Famine and her mother's name was Mary.

His mother, Jean Langmore Knowles, was born in Berwick, Victoria, to William Knowles, an Ulster Scot from Ballymena, and Margaret, as one of four daughters. Jean was a graduate of Sydney Girls High School, obtaining a Leaving Certificate, a rarity for a woman at that time, and worked in numerous paid jobs by virtue of her own successes and ability. Donald Kirby, aged 16, and Jean Knowles first met at Saint Martin's Anglican Church, Kensington. Donald attended Sydney Technical School in Ultimo, and afterwards worked as a general assistant, then tool and machinery salesman, at a hardware firm. The two became engaged on Jean's 21st birthday and were married in March 1937, a month after Donald turned 21; their first home was in Bloomfield Street, South Coogee.

Michael Kirby's brothers have also been lawyers: David Kirby AM was a judge of the Supreme Court of New South Wales, retiring in 2011; Donald was a solicitor until retiring in 2006. Sister Diana was a nurse in the Colorectal Unit of the Royal Prince Alfred Hospital in Sydney, retiring in 2011.

== Recognition, honours, and awards ==
=== Australian national honours ===
- 1977: Queen Elizabeth II Silver Jubilee Medal
- 1991: Companion of the Order of Australia (AC) in 1991, "For Service to the Law, Law Reform, to Learning and to the Community"
- 1982: Companion of the Order of St Michael and St George (CMG), for "Services to the law"
- 2001: Centenary Medal

=== Other honours and awards ===
- 1991: Human Rights Medal, bestowed by the Australian Human Rights Commission
- 1997: National Trust Australian Living Treasure
- 2008: Inaugural Australian Privacy Medal, awarded by Senator John Faulkner and Karen Curtis, the Australian Privacy Commissioner
- 2010: Gruber Prize for Justice
- 2017: Order of the Rising Sun, 2nd Class, Gold and Silver Star, a Japanese award, "In recognition of his contribution to promoting understanding of the situation of Human Rights in North Korea in the international society including the issue of the abductions of Japanese nationals" (awarded to former UN special rapporteur Marzuki Darusman at the same time)
- 2018: UN Day Honour
- 2022: Michael Kirby Building, a new Law School building at Macquarie University

=== Honorary degrees ===
- (New South Wales) University of Newcastle (DLitt) in 1987
- (New South Wales) Macquarie University (LL.D.) in 1994
- (New South Wales) University of Sydney (LL.D.) in 1996
- National Law School of India University (LL.D.) in 1997
- (United Kingdom) University of Ulster (D.Litt.) in 1998
- (United Kingdom) University of Buckingham (LL.D.) in 2000
- University of South Australia (D.Univ.) in 2001
- (Queensland) James Cook University (D.Litt.) in 2003
- (Australian Capital Territory) Australian National University (LL.D.) in 2004
- (New South Wales) Southern Cross University (D.Univ.) in 2007
- University of New South Wales (LL.D.) in 2008
- (Queensland) Griffith University (D.Univ.) in 2008
- (Western Australia) Murdoch University (LL.D.) in 2009
- (Queensland) Bond University (LL.D.) in 2009
- (Victoria (state)) University of Melbourne (LL.D.) in 2009
- (New South Wales) University of Technology, Sydney (LL.D.) in 2009
- (United States) Indiana University (LL.D.) in 2009
- (Sri Lanka) University of Colombo (LL.D.) in 2010
- (Victoria (state)) La Trobe University (D.Univ.) in 2011
- (Victoria (state)) Victoria University (LL.D.) in 2011
- (Victoria (state)) Deakin University (LL.D.) in 2011
- Central Queensland University (D.Univ.) in 2011
- (Victoria (state)) Monash University (LL.D.) in 2015
- (Canada) Queen's University at Kingston (LLD) in 2015.
- (Western Australia) Curtin University (D.Litt.) in 2016
- (New South Wales) University of Wollongong (LL.D.) in 2016
- University of Southern Queensland (LL.D.) in 2017
- (South Australia) University of Adelaide (D.Univ.) in 2017
- University of Tasmania (LL.D.) in 2017
- (India) National Law University Odisha (D.Univ.) in 2019
- (New South Wales) Charles Sturt University (D.Univ.) in 2024
- (New South Wales) University of New England (D.Litt.) in 2026

Legal offices
New title	Chairman of the Australian Law Reform Commission; 1975–1984	Succeeded by Murray Wilcox
Preceded by Robert Ellicott	Judge of the Federal Court of Australia; 1983–1984	Succeeded by Bill Pincus
Preceded by Athol Moffitt	President of the New South Wales Court of Appeal; 1984–1996	Succeeded by Dennis Mahoney
Preceded by Sir William Deane	Puisne Justice of the High Court of Australia; 1996–2009	Succeeded by Virginia Bell
Academic offices
Preceded by Percy Partridge	Chancellor of Macquarie University; 1984–1993	Succeeded by Tim Besley
