= List of fact-finding reports on human rights in North Korea =

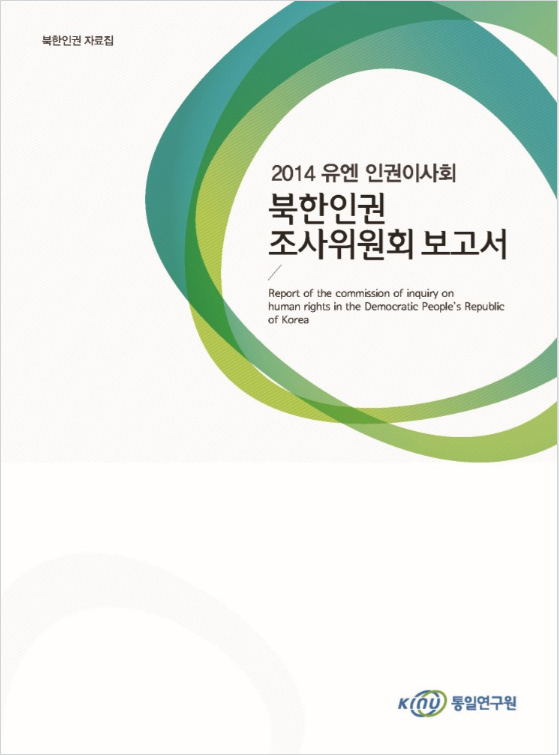
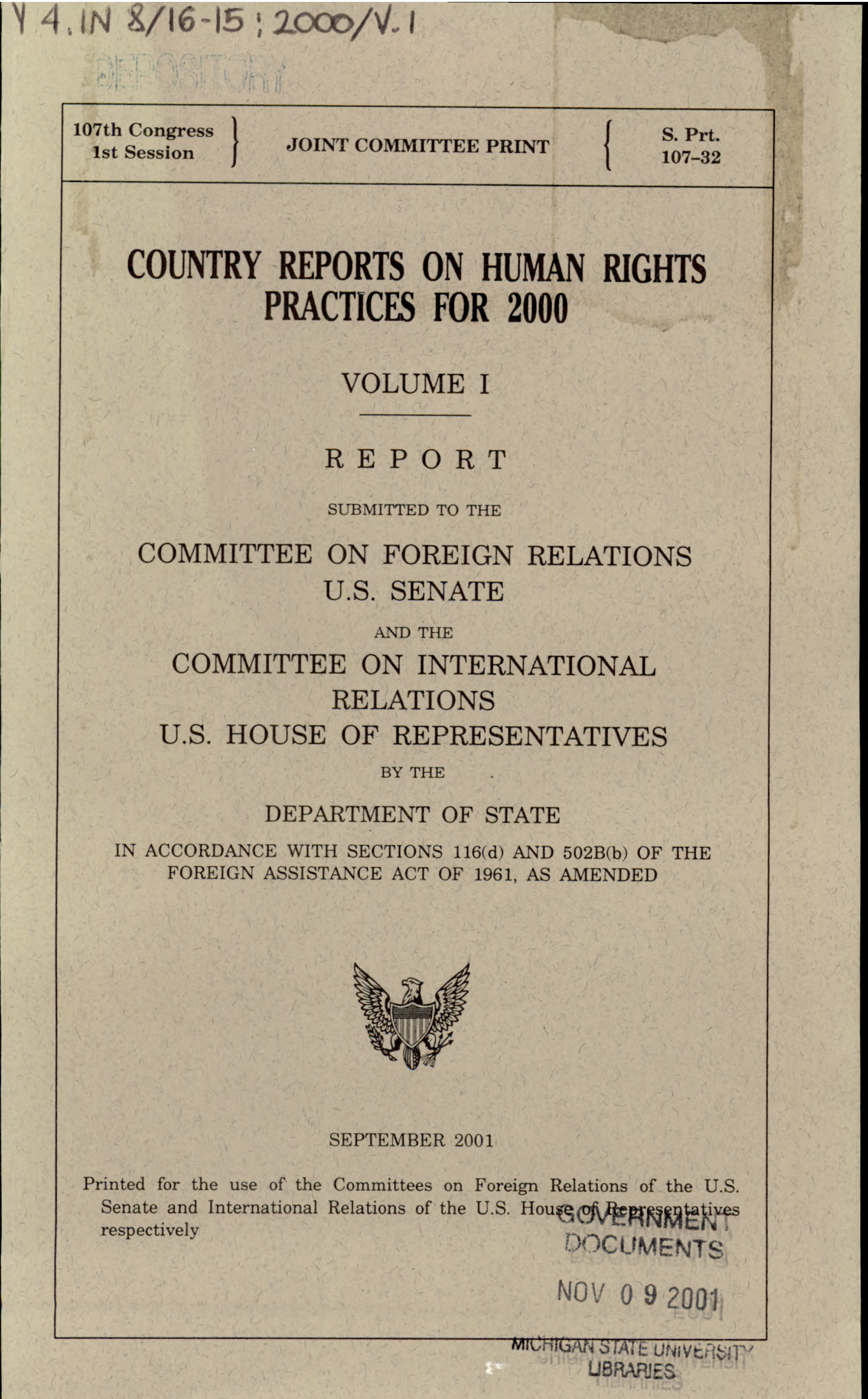
- General type: Publications
- Items listed: Fact-finding reports
- Topic: Human rights
- Period: 1977-present
- Geographical focus: North Korea (DPRK)
- Inclusion criteria: Fact-focused reports published by notable institutions in the inquiry and deliberations on the situation of H.R. in the DPRK
- Sorting criteria: Reports are generally first grouped by publishing entity type and entity, then by thematic type, then listed chronologically

Publications reporting the factual situation of human rights in North Korea (DPRK) are the basis upon which policies are shaped and society mobilized. This article includes those fact-finding publications issued by the United Nations, governments, and non-governmental organizations (NGOs)/ civil society entities.

This article focuses on listing fact-finding reports, which distinguish themselves from other publications such as pamphlets, news articles, books, or journal articles, in that they are meant to aggregate information from multiple sources and provide a balanced, overall view of the topic covered for the non-commercial purpose of informing the general public and policy makers. These reports tend to rely more on the credibility of their publishing institutions than on their individual authors. Fact-finding reports are also distinct from policy briefs as the latter ground their analysis and recommendations on the facts laid out in the former. The inclusion is based on the notability (and not the concurrence to any particular view) of the publishing institutions to the inquiry and deliberations on the situation in North Korea.

This list lays out the evolution of the reporting efforts, with a first wave of reports by human rights NGOs just describing the general characteristics of the regime, followed by another wave of civil society and governmental reports with some more details, then prompting the United Nations to also exercise greater scrutiny and pursue its own investigations.

The vast majority of reports (except those published by the DPRK itself, also included in this article) point to a very grave situation, with human rights systematically violated by the North Korean government.

Efforts to continue to investigate and document the situation of human rights in the DPRK are on-going, given that there are no indications of substantial improvements in the regime's policies, and despite the continued isolation of the regime that limits outside investigators' access to the country and to its general population.

== Introduction and overview ==
=== Historical context ===
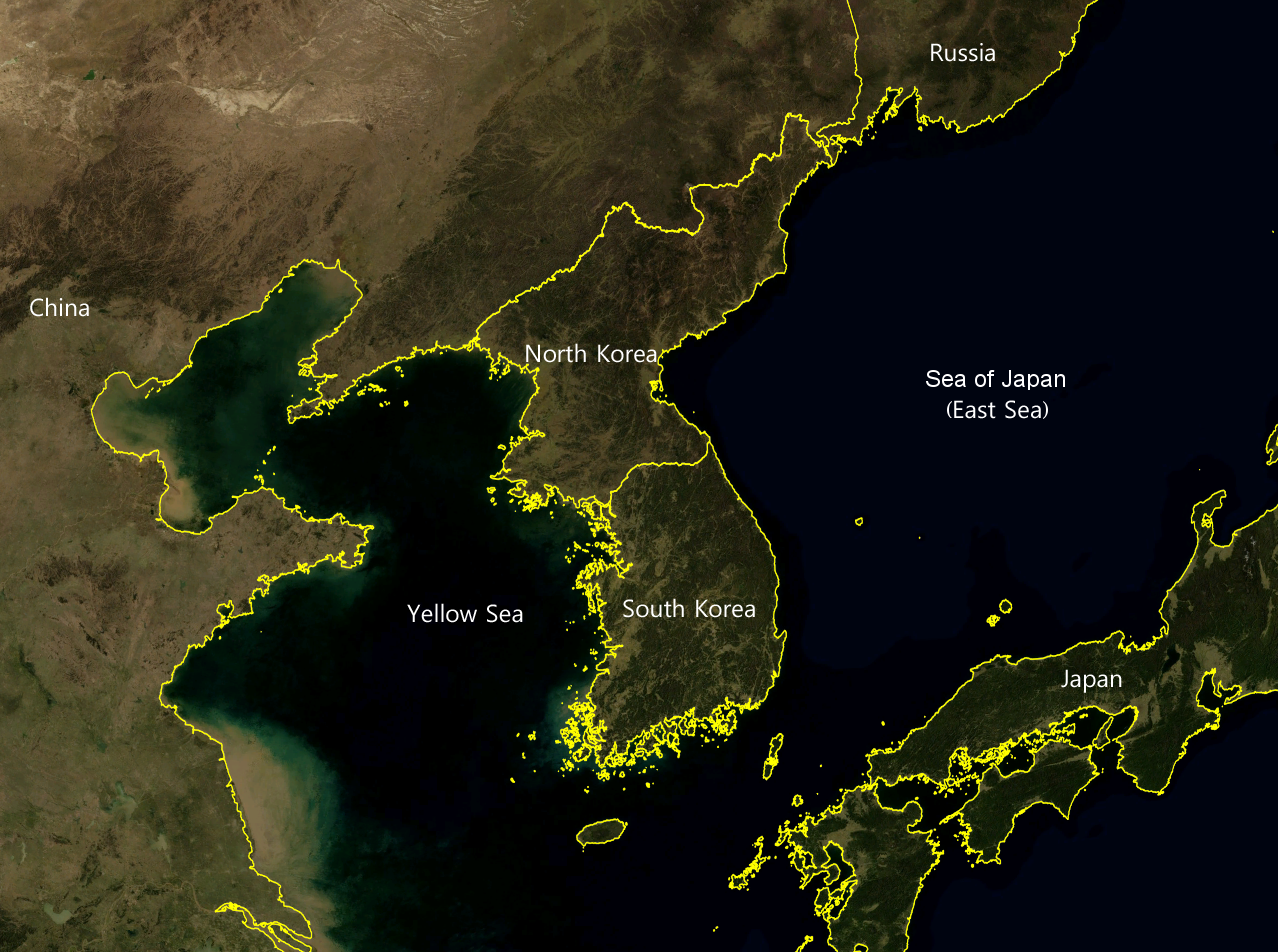
The Korean Peninsula, with China and Russia as its Northern neighbors, and Japan to the East and South

Korea had for centuries been a high-ranking tributary state within the Imperial Chinese tributary system, (Note: Kang, David C. (2010). East Asia Before the West: Five Centuries of Trade and Tribute, p. 59., p. 59, at Google Books) until in the late 19th century Japan began to assert greater control over the Korean peninsula, culminating in its annexation in 1910. It remained a colony of Japan, until Japan lost World War II in 1945. (Note: The Abacus and the Sword; Duus, Peter; Univ of California Press, 1995; pp. 18–24)

At the end of WWII, with Japan stripped of its colonial territories, the Korean Peninsula became a United Nations trusteeship, with the northern half administered by the Soviet Union, and the southern half administered by the United States. The ultimate stated plan was to allow Korea as a whole to become again a united and independent country. Disagreements among the parties on how and when to implement the united self-rule led to the two territories establishing their own separate and rival governments. The Korean War (1950–1953) was the last attempt to reunify the peninsula by force, but it ended in stalemate and it entrenched two very different regimes.

Within the Soviet and American spheres respectively, the North became a Stalinist totalitarian regime uninterruptedly led by the Kim family, and the South became a capitalist society that until 1987 included short periods of unstable democracy as well as longer periods of authoritarian rule, including over 25 years of right-wing military rule.

Propped by their allies, North and South experienced rapid economic growth after the Korean War, but in the 1970s the North's growth faltered while the South's accelerated.

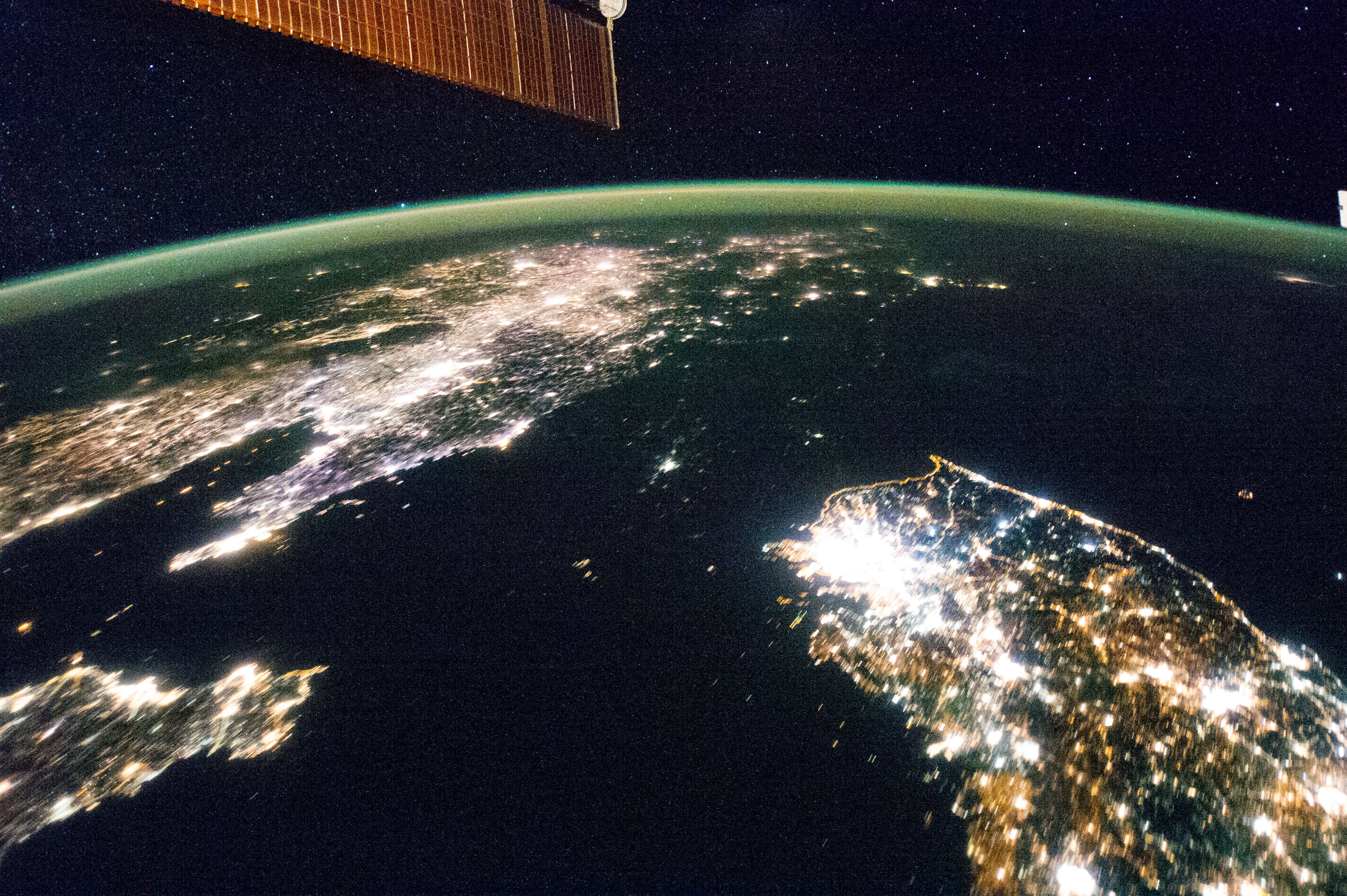
2014 Night satellite photograph of the Korean Peninsula; showing the bordering territories of China and Russia at the top, North Korea in the center, and South Korea in the bottom-right

While South Korea had a period of military autocracy, mass mobilizations of its citizens forced its end in 1987. This led to the modern South Korea being a young, more stable democracy with a prosperous free market economy. Meanwhile, North Korea's totalitarian regime kept a stronger grip on its society, which was never able to mobilize to demand reforms. Its command economy stagnated in the 1970s, and after the disintegration of the Soviet Union it spiralled into crisis in the 1990s, leading to a massive famine. North Korea remains to this day as one of the most isolated countries in the world, with a struggling economy, within an isolationist, militaristic, and totalitarian regime.

=== Chronology and major themes ===
The reporting of human rights in the DPRK follows the progression of the modern movement of human rights, which from the 1970s civil society and governmental efforts made violations more visible to the general public and in international politics.

Given the opacity of the DPRK's regime, especially before the 1990s, little was known about the situation of human rights. The few reports that were issued at that time made note of the lack of concrete information, mostly only being able to describe the general characteristics of the country's political system. Amnesty International, founded in 1961, began to issue some basic reports on the DPRK in 1977. In 1979 the US's Department of State also began to cover the DPRK in its Country Reports on Human Rights Practices.

With the dissolution of the Soviet Union, and the subsequent North Korean famine of the 1990s, a higher number of individuals began to flee the country, and more first-person accounts began to be collected by human rights organizations. That was also followed in the early 2000s by greater availability of satellite imagery. South Korea, having itself transitioned from a military dictatorship to a democracy in the late 1980s, began to publish reports in 1996 through its governmental think tank Korea Institute for National Unification. In the late 1990s and 2000s several NGOs specialized on North Korea emerged and began to publish their own research: Citizens' Alliance for North Korean Human Rights (1996), Committee for Human Rights in North Korea (2001), Database Center for North Korean Human Rights (2003), People for Successful Corean Reunification (2006). Around the same time some other world-wide human rights organizations such as Human Rights Watch and Christian Solidarity Worldwide also began to publish reports on the DPRK.

As reports from NGOs and governments began to reveal more details on the human rights situation in the DPRK during the 1990s and 2000s, these concerns were elevated to the United Nations, where various UN bodies and parties also began to express a growing concern on the situation and opacity of the regime. The mounting evidence being collected and published by governments and civil society led in 2004 to the establishment of the mandate for the Special Rapporteur on the situation of human rights in the DPRK, issuing reports annually.

The growing amount of information, and the grave situation it increasingly revealed, led the United Nations General Assembly and the UN Human Rights Council (HRC) to repeatedly pass resolutions officially expressing their concerns and urging the DPRK's government to change its ways.

Ten years later, further joint efforts by the UN Special Rapporteur, governments, and NGOs led to the establishment of a special one-time investigation unprecedented in depth and breadth commissioned by the Human Rights Council, with a landmark report published in 2014. It was deemed the most authoritative report up to that point. The report unequivocally concluded that the DPRK regime committed gross and systematic violations of human rights including freedom of thought, expression and religion; freedom from discrimination; freedom of movement and residence; and the right to food, as well as crimes against humanity entailing "extermination, murder, enslavement, torture, imprisonment, rape, forced abortions and other sexual violence, persecution on political, religious, racial and gender grounds, the forcible transfer of populations, the enforced disappearance of persons and the inhumane act of knowingly causing prolonged starvation".

The UN's fact-finding process continues to yield periodical reports, which greatly rely on and are underpinned by the also on-going research and publishing conducted by NGOs and governmental agencies.

Increased awareness of human rights abuses has led to efforts in shaping policy and pressuring the North Korean regime. However the pursuit for the improvement of human rights in the DPRK has had to contend with the efforts of preventing a nuclear weapons escalation. Further, the isolationist and totalitarian nature of the regime has also meant that information and freedom of movement of its population as well as that of foreigners is still tightly controlled, making extremely challenging to document abuses on the ground, including having access to imagery (other than satellite imagery) that could inspire greater action.

== United Nations ==
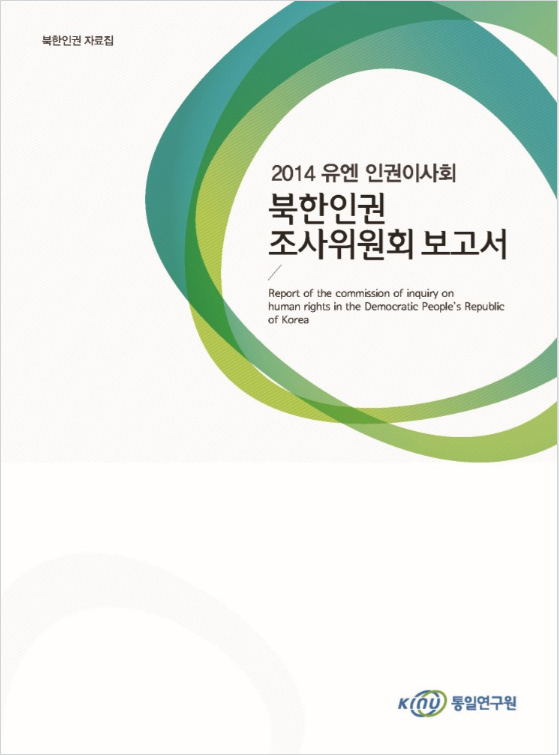
Cover of the Korean version of the UN's Report of the commission of inquiry on human rights in the DPRK

The United Nations has issued four main kinds of reports on the human rights of North Korea.

The first are a series of documents intended to be recommendations from Treaty-based bodies, which are issued by those bodies to each country that is party to it (in contrast to charter-based bodies, which all UN members are part of). These treaty-based bodies that North Korea has decided to be a party to include the Convention on the Elimination of All Forms of Discrimination Against Women, Committee on the Rights of the Child, and International Covenant on Civil and Political Rights. The first document of this kind was issued in 1998 (Convention on the Rights of the Child); the second was in 2001 (International Covenant on Civil and Political Rights), after a 17-year delay in North Korea submitting the required information to the committee.

Prompted by growing evidence provided by human rights NGOs, during the 1990s and 2000s various UN bodies and parties expressed greater concern on the situation of human rights in North Korea and the opacity of the country's government. That led to another series of reports that were started by the UN Commission on Human Rights (the predecessor of the UN Human Rights Council), which established the mandate for the Special Rapporteur on the situation of human rights in the DPRK in 2004, issuing reports annually. They are issued in detail to the Human Rights Council, and in a more condensed form to the General Assembly.

The United Nations also conducts a Universal Periodic Review (every 3 or 4 years, in which all UN members are subject to a review on their human rights practices), with the first report on North Korea issued in 2010.

Finally, the most notable one was the 2014 Report of the Commission of Inquiry on Human Rights in the DPRK, considered a landmark document resulting from a special in-depth, one-time investigation commissioned by the Human Rights Council, It was deemed the most authoritative report up to that point.

=== 2014 Commission of inquiry ===
- United Nations Human Rights Council Session 25 Summary record Report of the commission of inquiry on human rights in the Democratic People's Republic of Korea A/HRC/25/63 7 February 2014. (Archived here)
- United Nations Human Rights Council Session 25 Report of the detailed findings of the commission of inquiry on human rights in the Democratic People's Republic of Korea A/HRC/25/CRP.1 7 February 2014. (Archived here)

=== Universal Periodic Review ===
- Human Rights Council Session 13th Document Report of the Working Group on the Universal Periodic Review – Democratic People's Republic of Korea A/HRC/13/13 4 January 2010.
- Human Rights Council Session 27th Document Report of the Working Group on the Universal Periodic Review – Democratic People's Republic of Korea A/HRC/27/10 2 July 2014.

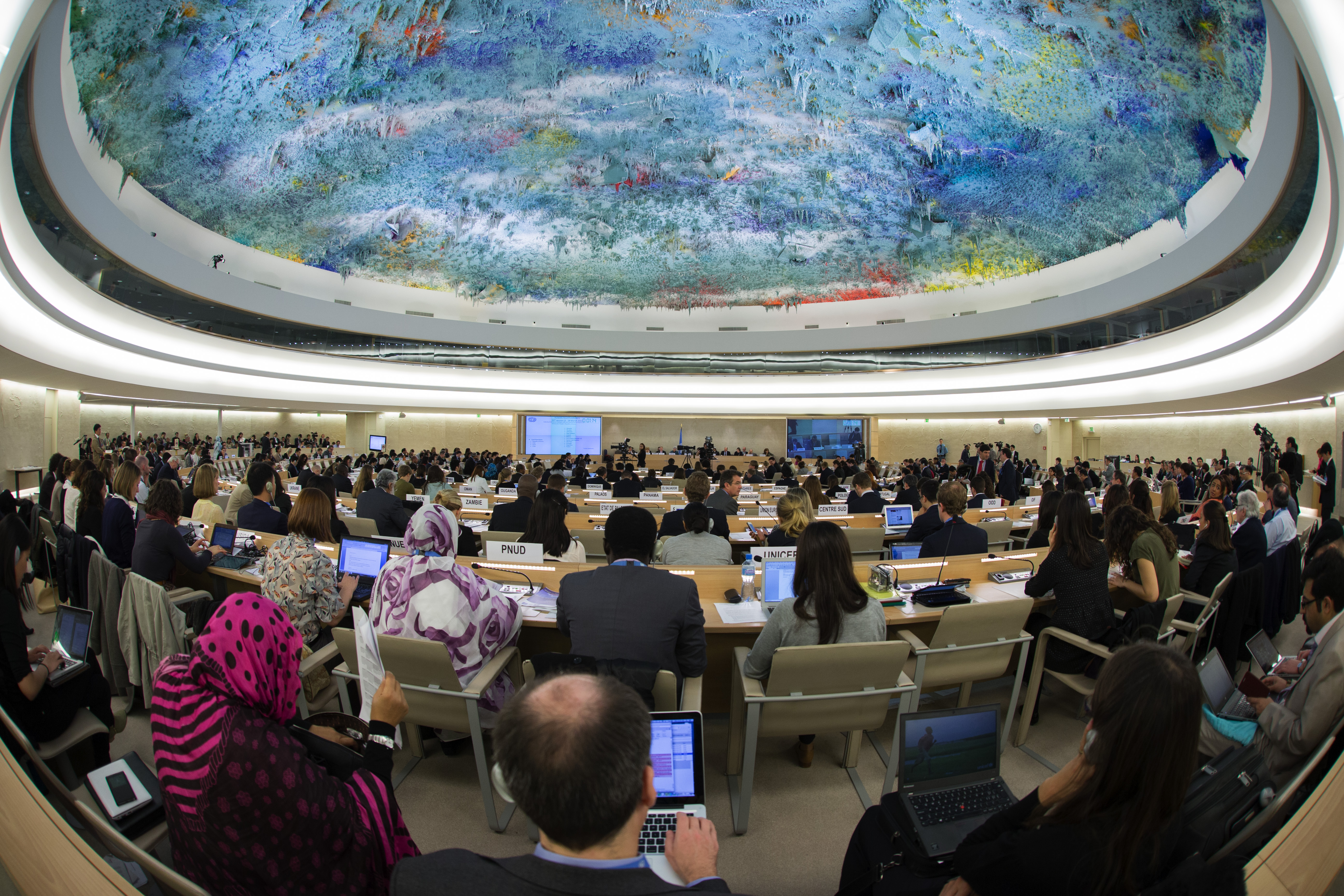
Presentation of the 2014 Commission of Inquiry Report on North Korea at the UN Human Rights Council

=== Special Rapporteur ===
Special Rapporteur annual reports to the Human Rights Council

- Human Rights Council Session 4th Document Report of the Special Rapporteur on the situation of human rights in the Democratic People's Republic of Korea, Vitit Muntarbhorn A/HRC/4/15 7 February 2007.
- Human Rights Council Session 7th Document Report of the Special Rapporteur on the situation of human rights in the Democratic People's Republic of Korea, Vitit Muntarbhorn A/HRC/7/20 15 February 2008.
- Human Rights Council Session 10th Document Report of the Special Rapporteur on the situation of human rights in the Democratic People's Republic of Korea, Marzuki Darusman A/HRC/10/18 24 February 2009.
- Human Rights Council Session 16th Document Report of the Special Rapporteur on the situation of human rights in the Democratic People's Republic of Korea A/HRC/16/58 21 February 2011.
- Human Rights Council Session 19th Document Report of the Special Rapporteur on the situation of human rights in the Democratic People's Republic of Korea A/HRC/19/65 13 February 2012.
- Human Rights Council Session 22nd Document Report of the Special Rapporteur on the situation of human rights in the Democratic People's Republic of Korea, Marzuki Darusman A/HRC/22/57 1 February 2013.
- Human Rights Council Session 26th Document Report of the Special Rapporteur on the situation of human rights in the Democratic People's Republic of Korea, Marzuki Darusman A/HRC/26/43 13 June 2014.
- Human Rights Council Session 28th Document Report of the Special Rapporteur on the situation of human rights in the Democratic People's Republic of Korea, Marzuki Darusman A/HRC/28/71 18 March 2015.
- Human Rights Council Session 31th Document Report of the Special Rapporteur on the situation of human rights in the Democratic People's Republic of Korea A/HRC/31/70 19 January 2016.
- Human Rights Council Session 34th Document Report of the Special Rapporteur on the situation of human rights in the Democratic People's Republic of Korea A/HRC/34/66 22 February 2017.
- Human Rights Council Session 37th Document Report of the Special Rapporteur on the situation of human rights in the Democratic People's Republic of Korea A/HRC/37/69 9 March 2018.
- Human Rights Council Session 40th Document Report of the Special Rapporteur on the situation of human rights in the Democratic People's Republic of Korea A/HRC/40/66 30 May 2019.
- Human Rights Council Session 43th Document Report of the Special Rapporteur on the situation of human rights in the Democratic People's Republic of Korea A/HRC/43/58 1 May 2020.
- Human Rights Council Session 46th Document Report of the Special Rapporteur on the situation of human rights in the Democratic People's Republic of Korea A/HRC/46/51 2 July 2021.
- Human Rights Council Session 49th Document Report of the Special Rapporteur on the situation of human rights in the Democratic People's Republic of Korea A/HRC/49/74 30 August 2022.
- Human Rights Council Session 52th Document Report of the Special Rapporteur on the situation of human rights in the Democratic People's Republic of Korea A/HRC/52/65 3 April 2023.
- Human Rights Council Session 55th Document Report of the Special Rapporteur on the situation of human rights in the Democratic People's Republic of Korea A/HRC/55/63 26 March 2024.
- Human Rights Council Session 58th Document Report of the Special Rapporteur on the situation of human rights in the Democratic People's Republic of Korea, Elizabeth Salmón A/HRC/58/65 5 February 2025.
Special Rapporteur annual reports to the General Assembly
- United Nations General Assembly Session 60th Document Situation of human rights in the Democratic People's Republic of Korea A/60/306 29 August 2005.
- United Nations General Assembly Session 61st Document Situation of human rights in the Democratic People's Republic of Korea A/61/349 15 September 2006.
- United Nations General Assembly Session 62nd Document Situation of human rights in the Democratic People's Republic of Korea A/62/264 15 August 2007.
- United Nations General Assembly Session 64th Document Situation of human rights in the Democratic People's Republic of Korea A/64/224 4 August 2009.
- United Nations General Assembly Session 65th Document Situation of human rights in the Democratic People's Republic of Korea A/65/364 14 September 2010.
- United Nations General Assembly Session 66th Document Situation of human rights in the Democratic People's Republic of Korea A/66/322 24 August 2011.
- United Nations General Assembly Session 68th Document Situation of human rights in the Democratic People's Republic of Korea A/68/319 14 August 2013.
- United Nations General Assembly Session 69th Document Situation of human rights in the Democratic People's Republic of Korea A/69/639 5 December 2014.
- United Nations General Assembly Session 72nd Document Situation of human rights in the Democratic People's Republic of Korea A/72/394 18 September 2017.
- United Nations General Assembly Session 73rd Document Situation of human rights in the Democratic People's Republic of Korea A/73/308 6 August 2018.

=== Other reports ===
Other reports - UN Treaty Bodies
- United Nations Convention on the Rights of the Child Document Convention on the Rights of the Child - COMMITTEE ON THE RIGHTS OF THE CHILD Eighteenth session CONSIDERATION OF REPORTS SUBMITTED BY STATES PARTIES UNDER ARTICLE 44 OF THE CONVENTION Concluding observations of the Committee on the Rights of the Child: Democratic People's Republic of Korea CRC/C/15/Add.88 24 Jun 1998.
- United Nations International Covenant on Civil and Political Rights Document - CONSIDERATION OF REPORTS SUBMITTED BY STATES PARTIES UNDER ARTICLE 40 OF THE COVENANT Concluding observations of the Human Rights Committee DEMOCRATIC PEOPLE’S REPUBLIC OF KOREA CCPR/CO/72/PRK 27 Aug 2001.
- United Nations Economic and Social Council Session 31st Document Concluding observations of the Committee on Economic, Social and Cultural Rights DEMOCRATIC PEOPLE’S REPUBLIC OF KOREA E/C.12/1/Add.95 12 December 2003.
- United Nations Convention on the Rights of the Child Document COMMITTEE ON THE RIGHTS OF THE CHILD Thirty-sixth session CONSIDERATION OF REPORTS SUBMITTED BY STATES PARTIES UNDER ARTICLE 44 OF THE CONVENTION Concluding Observations of the Committee on the Rights of the Child: Democratic People's Republic of Korea CRC/C/15/Add.239 01 Jul 2004.
- United Nations Convention on the Elimination of All Forms of Discrimination against Women Document Concluding comments: Democratic People's Republic of Korea CEDAW/C/PRK/CO/1 03 Aug 2005.
- United Nations Convention on the Rights of the Child Document COMMITTEE ON THE RIGHTS OF THE CHILD Fiftieth session CONSIDERATION OF REPORTS SUBMITTED BY STATES PARTIES UNDER ARTICLE 44 OF THE CONVENTION Concluding Observations: Democratic People's Republic of Korea CRC/C/PRK/CO/4 27 March 2009.
- Human Rights Council Session 31st Document Role and achievements of the Office of the United Nations High Commissioner for Human Rights with regard to the situation of human rights in the Democratic People's Republic of Korea A/HRC/31/38 1 February 2016.
- United Nations Convention on the Rights of the Child Document Committee on the Rights of the Child Concluding observations on the fifth periodic report of the Democratic People's Republic of Korea CRC/C/PRK/CO/5 23 October 2017.
- United Nations Convention on the Elimination of All Forms of Discrimination against Women Document Committee on the Elimination of Discrimination against Women Concluding observations on the combined second to fourth periodic reports of the Democratic People's Republic of Korea CEDAW/C/PRK/CO/2/4 22 November 2017.
Other reports - UN Charter-based Bodies
- Torn Apart - The Human Rights Dimension of the Involuntary Separation of Korean Families (PDF) (Report). UN Office of the High Commissioner for Human Rights (OHCHR). December 2016. Archived (PDF) from the original on 2017-02-13.
- Human Rights Council Session 34 Document Report of the group of independent experts on accountability A/HRC/34/66/Add.1 24 February 2017.

== Governmental reports ==
=== North Korea ===
North Korea published a report on its own human rights situation, as a rebuttal to the 2014 United Nations report. It has also submitted reports to the United Nations.

- DPRK's Association for Human Rights Studies (September 13, 2014). Report of the DPRK Association for Human Rights Studies (PDF) (Report). Korean Central News Agency. Archived from the original (PDF) on June 29, 2015. (also archived here, and here)

==== Reports to the United Nations ====
- United Nations Economic and Social Council Document IMPLEMENTATION OF THE INTERNATIONAL COVENANT ON ECONOMIC, SOCIAL AND CULTURAL RIGHTS Initial reports submitted by States Parties to the Covenant concerning rights covered by articles 6 to 9, in accordance with the first stage of the programme established by the Economic and Social Council in its resolution 1988 (LX) ~~ Addendum DEMOCRATIC PEOPLE'S REPUBLIC OF KOREA E/1984/6/Add.7 5 February 1985.
- United Nations Economic and Social Council Document IMPLEMENTATION OF THE INTERNATIONAL COVENANT ON ECONOMIC SOCIAL AND CULTURAL RIGHTS Initial reports submitted by States parties to the covenant, in accordance with Council resolution 1988 (LX), concerning rights covered by articles 10 to 12 DEMOCRATIC PEOPLE'S REPUBLIC OF KOREA E/1986/3/Add.5 5 November 1986.
- United Nations Economic and Social Council Document IMPLEMENTATION OF THE INTERNATIONAL COVENANT ON ECONOMIC, SOCIAL AND CULTURAL RIGHTS Initial reports submitted by States Parties to the Covenant concerning rights covered by articles 13-15, in accordance with the third stage of the programme established by the Economic and Social Council in its resolution 1988 (LX) -- Adendum E/1988/5/Add.6 14 April 1989.
- Human Rights Council Document CORE DOCUMENT FORMING PART OF THE REPORTS OF STATES PARTIES DEMOCRATIC PEOPLE’S REPUBLIC OF KOREA HRI/CORE/1/Add.108 15 May 2000.
- United Nations Economic and Social Council Document IMPLEMENTATION OF THE INTERNATIONAL COVENANT ON ECONOMIC, SOCIAL AND CULTURAL RIGHTS Second periodic reports submitted by States parties under articles 16 and 17 of the Covenant - Addendum -DEMOCRATIC PEOPLE’S REPUBLIC OF KOREA E/1990/6/Add.35 15 May 2002.

=== South Korea ===
Cover of the White Paper on Human Rights in North Korea 2017

The Korea Institute for National Unification (KINU; formerly the Research Institute for National Unification) opened the Center for North Korean Human Rights in 1994 to collect and manage systematically all source materials and objective data concerning North Korean human rights; and from 1996, KINU has been publishing every year the ‘White Paper on Human Rights in North Korea’ in Korean and in English. Other reports, including reports by the U.S. government, use South Korea KINU's reports as part of their sources. Another South Korean governmental institution publishing research on human rights in the DPRK is the National Human Rights Commission of Korea (NHRCK).

==== Annual general reports (Korea Institute for National Unification) ====
- Ok, Tae Hwan; et al. White Paper on Human Rights in North Korea 1996 (Report). ISSN 1225-6072.
- Kim, Philo; et al. White Paper on Human Rights in North Korea 1997 (Report). ISBN 89-87509-01-X.
- White Paper on Human Rights in North Korea 1998 (Report). ISBN 89-87509-38-9.
- Choi, Euichul; et al. White Paper on Human Rights in North Korea 1999 (Report). ISBN 89-8479-187-3.
- Jhe, Seongho; et al. White Paper on Human Rights in North Korea 2000 (Report).
- Suh, Jaejean; et al. White Paper on Human Rights in North Korea 2001 (Report).
- Suh, Jae Jean; et al. White Paper on Human Rights in North Korea 2002 (Report).
- Suh, Jae Jean; et al. White Paper on Human Rights in North Korea 2003 (Report). ISBN 89-8479-187-3.
- Lee, Keum-Soon; et al. White Paper on Human Rights in North Korea 2004 (Report). ISBN 89-8479-187-3.
- Lee, Keum-Soon; et al. White Paper on Human Rights in North Korea 2005 (Report). ISBN 89-8479-293-4.
- Kim, Soo-am; et al. White Paper on Human Rights in North Korea 2007 (Report). ISBN 978-89-8479-406-1.
- Lee, Keum-Soon; et al. White Paper on Human Rights in North Korea 2008 (Report). ISBN 978-89-8479-462-7.
- Lee, Keum-Soon; et al. White Paper on Human Rights in North Korea 2009 (Report). ISBN 978-89-8479-497-9.
- Park, Young-ho; et al. White Paper on Human Rights in North Korea 2010 (Report). ISBN 978-89-8479-553-2.
- Kim, Kook-shin; et al. White Paper on Human Rights in North Korea 2011 (Report). ISBN 978-89-8479-603-4.
- Kim, Soo-am; et al. White Paper on Human Rights in North Korea 2012 (Report). ISBN 978-89-8479-656-0.
- White Paper on Human Rights in North Korea 2013 (Report). ISBN 978-89-8479-714-7.
- White Paper on Human Rights in North Korea 2014 (Report). ISBN 978-89-8479-766-6.
- Do, Kyung-ok; et al. White Paper on Human Rights in North Korea 2015 (Report). ISBN 978-89-8479-802-1.
- Do, Kyung-ok; et al. White Paper on Human Rights in North Korea 2016 (Report). ISBN 978-89-8479-839-7.
- Do, Kyung-ok; et al. White Paper on Human Rights in North Korea 2017 (Report). ISBN 978-89-8479-875-5.

==== Thematic reports and other (KINU and NHRCK) ====
- Survey on North Korean Human Rights Conditions (PDF) (Report). National Human Rights Commission of Korea. 2009-09-17.
- Survey Report on Political Prisoners' Camps in North Korea (PDF) (Report). National Human Rights Commission of Korea. 2010-09-30. ISBN 978-89-6114-206-9.
- Relations between Corruption and Human Rights in North Korea (Report). Korea Institute for National Unification. 2013.
- Human Rights Situation of Women and Children in North Korea (Report). Korea Institute for National Unification. 2016.
- Torture and Inhumane Treatment in North Korea (Report). Korea Institute for National Unification. 2016.
- Study on Changing Trends of Human Rights Institution and Situation in North Korea (Report). Korea Institute for National Unification. 2017.

=== United States ===
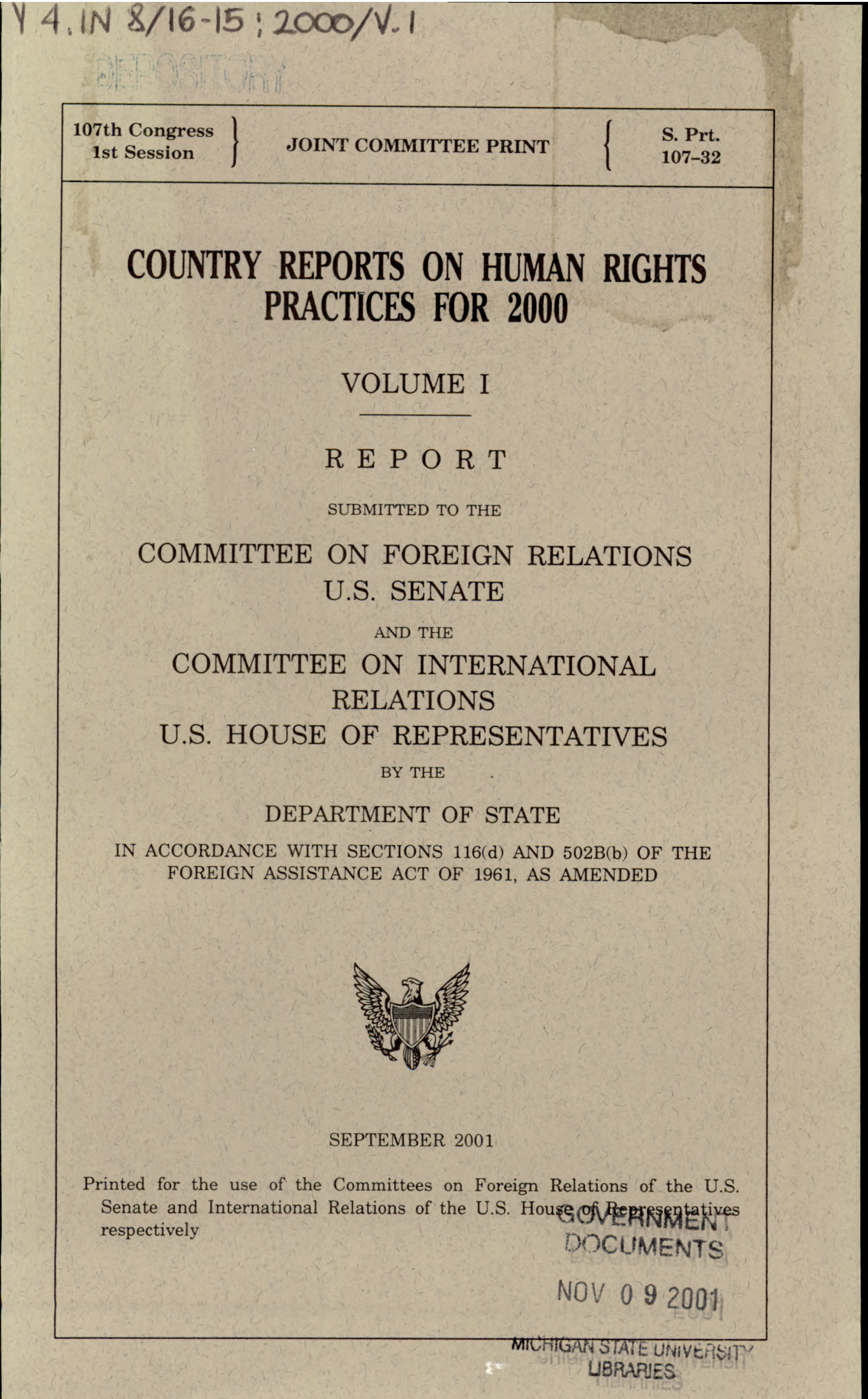
Country Reports on Human Rights Practices for 2000 report cover

The United States government, through its Department of State's (DOS) Bureau of Democracy, Human Rights, and Labor has published annually Country Reports on Human Rights Practices, that beginning in 1979 included North Korea. Also, two different bodies within the U.S. government have published reports on religious freedom: the Department of State (since 2001), and U.S. Commission on International Religious Freedom (USCRIF; since 2003). Finally, the DOS' Office to Monitor and Combat Trafficking in Persons also publishes Trafficking in Persons Reports (TIP) that include some coverage of North Korea. The TIP reports series began in 2001, following the passing of the Victims of Trafficking and Violence Protection Act of 2000, with North Korea beginning to be briefly covered starting in the 2003 report, and more fully covered beginning in 2005.

The Country Reports on Human Rights Practices issued by the DOS noted every year the difficulty of having detailed an up-to-date information, and instead relying on sparse information collected over several years. This was especially the case in the during the 1970s and 80s, and began to change in the 1990s with more witness accounts, while continuing to note a lack of more detailed and more timely information. As more reports became available, the DOS and USCRIF reports have frequently cited reports from the United Nations, South Korea's Korea Institute for National Unification (starting in 1996), nonprofits (especially the Committee for Human Rights in North Korea and Data Center for North Korean Human Rights, since their establishment in the 2000s), and from the press.

==== Annual general reports ====
Annual general reports 1980-1999
- 1979 Country Reports on Human Rights Practices (Report). February 4, 1980. pp. 467–472.
- 1980 Country Reports on Human Rights Practices (Report). February 2, 1981. pp. 631–638.
- 1981 Country Reports on Human Rights Practices (Report). February 1982. pp. 619–625.
- 1982 Country Reports on Human Rights Practices (Report). February 1983. pp. 735–741.
- 1983 Country Reports on Human Rights Practices (Report). February 1984. pp. 804–811.
- 1984 Country Reports on Human Rights Practices (Report). February 1985. pp. 789–797.
- 1985 Country Reports on Human Rights Practices (Report). 1986. pp. 791–797.
- 1986 Country Reports on Human Rights Practices (Report). February 1987. pp. 737–743.
- 1987 Country Reports on Human Rights Practices (Report). 1988. pp. 721–727.
- 1988 Country Reports on Human Rights Practices (Report). February 1989. pp. 834–841.
- 1989 Country Reports on Human Rights Practices (Report). February 1990. pp. 877–884.
- 1990 Country Reports on Human Rights Practices (Report). February 1991. pp. 921–928.
- 1991 Country Reports on Human Rights Practices (Report). February 1992. pp. 887–894. ISBN 0-16-037393-X.
- 1992 Country Reports on Human Rights Practices (Report). February 1993. pp. 588–591. ISBN 0-16-040072-4.
- 1993 Country Reports on Human Rights Practices (Report).
- 1994 Country Reports on Human Rights Practices (Report).
- 1995 Country Reports on Human Rights Practices (Report). April 1996. pp. 639–644. ISBN 0-16-052480-6.
- 1996 Country Reports on Human Rights Practices (Report). February 1997. pp. 690–698. ISBN 0-16-054190-5.
- 1997 Country Reports on Human Rights Practices (Report). March 1998. pp. 813–822.
- 1998 Country Reports on Human Rights Practices (Report). April 1999. pp. 952–962.
- 1998 Country Reports on Human Rights Practices (Report). April 1999. pp. 952–962. ISBN 0-16-058293-8.
- 1999 Country Reports on Human Rights Practices:DPRK (Report). 2000.

Annual general reports 2000–present

- 2000 Country Reports on Human Rights Practices (Report). 2001. pp. 914–927.
- 2001 Country Reports on Human Rights Practices (Report). 2002.
- 2002 Country Reports on Human Rights Practices (Report). 2003.
- 2003 Country Reports on Human Rights Practices (Report). 2004.
- 2004 Country Reports on Human Rights Practices (Report). 2005.
- 2005 Country Reports on Human Rights Practices (Report). 2006.
- 2006 Country Reports on Human Rights Practices (Report). 2007.
- 2007 Country Reports on Human Rights Practices (Report). 2008.
- 2008 Country Reports on Human Rights Practices (Report). 2009.
- 2009 Country Reports on Human Rights Practices (Report). 2010.
- 2010 Country Reports on Human Rights Practices (Report). 2011.
- 2011 Human Rights Reports: Democratic People's Republic of Korea (PDF) (Report). May 24, 2012.
- 2012 Human Rights Reports: Democratic People's Republic of Korea (PDF) (Report). April 19, 2013.
- Democratic People's Republic of Korea 2014 Human Rights Report (PDF) (Report). June 25, 2015.
- 2016 Human Rights Reports: Democratic People's Republic of Korea (PDF) (Report). 2016. Archived from the original (PDF) on 2018-03-06.
- Report on Human Rights Abuses or Censorship in North Korea (Report). January 11, 2017.
- Report on Serious Human Rights Abuses and Censorship in North Korea (Report). October 26, 2017. Archived from the original on 2018-05-21.

==== Religious freedom reports (Department of State) ====
- 2001 International Religious Freedom Reports: Democratic People's Republic of Korea (Report).
- 2002 International Religious Freedom Reports: Democratic People's Republic of Korea (Report).
- 2003 International Religious Freedom Reports: Democratic People's Republic of Korea (Report).
- 2004 International Religious Freedom Reports: Democratic People's Republic of Korea (Report).
- 2005 International Religious Freedom Reports: Democratic People's Republic of Korea (Report).
- 2006 International Religious Freedom Reports: Democratic People's Republic of Korea (Report).
- 2007 International Religious Freedom Reports: Democratic People's Republic of Korea (Report).
- 2008 International Religious Freedom Reports: Democratic People's Republic of Korea (Report).
- 2009 International Religious Freedom Reports: Democratic People's Republic of Korea (Report).
- 2010 International Religious Freedom Reports: Democratic People's Republic of Korea (PDF) (Report).
- 2011 International Religious Freedom Reports: Democratic People's Republic of Korea (PDF) (Report).
- 2012 International Religious Freedom Reports: Democratic People's Republic of Korea (PDF) (Report).
- 2013 International Religious Freedom Reports: Democratic People's Republic of Korea (PDF) (Report).
- 2014 International Religious Freedom Reports: Democratic People's Republic of Korea (PDF) (Report). October 14, 2015.
- 2015 International Religious Freedom Reports: Democratic People's Republic of Korea (PDF) (Report). August 10, 2016.
- 2016 International Religious Freedom Reports: Democratic People's Republic of Korea (PDF) (Report). August 15, 2017. Archived from the original (PDF) on 2017-12-06.

==== Religious freedom reports (Commission on International Religious Freedom) ====
- Hawk, David; et al. (2005). Thank You Father Kim Il Sung: Eyewitness Accounts of Severe Violations of Freedom of Thought, Conscience, and Religion in North Korea (PDF) (Report). Archived (PDF) from the original on 2017-07-09.
- 2006 Annual Report of the United States Commission on International Religious Freedom: DPRK (PDF) (Report). Archived (PDF) from the original on 2017-08-01.
- 2007 Annual Report of the United States Commission on International Religious Freedom: DPRK (PDF) (Report). Archived (PDF) from the original on 2017-08-01.
- A prison without bars - Refugee and Defector Testimonies of Severe Violations of Freedom of Religion or Belief in North Korea (PDF) (Report). March 2008. Archived from the original (PDF) on 2009-01-14.
- 2008 Annual Report of the United States Commission on International Religious Freedom: DPRK (PDF) (Report). May 2008. Archived (PDF) from the original on 2017-08-01.
- 2009 Annual Report of the United States Commission on International Religious Freedom: DPRK (PDF) (Report). 2009. Archived (PDF) from the original on 2017-08-01.
- 2010 Annual Report of the United States Commission on International Religious Freedom: DPRK (PDF) (Report). 2010. Archived (PDF) from the original on 2017-08-01.
- 2011 Annual Report of the United States Commission on International Religious Freedom: DPRK (PDF) (Report). 2011. Archived (PDF) from the original on 2017-08-01.
- 2012 Annual Report of the United States Commission on International Religious Freedom: DPRK (PDF) (Report). 2012. Archived (PDF) from the original on 2017-06-03.
- 2013 Annual Report of the United States Commission on International Religious Freedom: DPRK (PDF) (Report). 2013. Archived (PDF) from the original on 2017-06-03.
- 2014 Annual Report of the United States Commission on International Religious Freedom: DPRK (PDF) (Report). 2014. Archived (PDF) from the original on 2017-06-03.
- 2015 Annual Report of the United States Commission on International Religious Freedom: DPRK (PDF) (Report). 2015. Archived (PDF) from the original on 2017-06-03.
- 2016 Annual Report of the United States Commission on International Religious Freedom: DPRK (PDF) (Report). 2016. Archived (PDF) from the original on 2017-08-01.

==== Trafficking in Persons Reports ====
- 2003 Trafficking in Persons Report (PDF) (Report). p. 116.
- 2004 Trafficking in Persons Report (PDF) (Report). p. 104.
- 2005 Trafficking in Persons Report (PDF) (Report). p. 170.
- 2006 Trafficking in Persons Report (PDF) (Report). pp. 194–195.
- 2007 Trafficking in Persons Report (PDF) (Report). pp. 17, 161–162.
- 2008 Trafficking in Persons Report (PDF) (Report). pp. 7, 24, 198–200.
- 2009 Trafficking in Persons Report (PDF) (Report). pp. 227–229.
- 2010 Trafficking in Persons Report (PDF) (Report). pp. 198–199.
- 2011 Trafficking in Persons Report (PDF) (Report). pp. 215–216.
- 2012 Trafficking in Persons Report (PDF) (Report). pp. 208–210.
- 2013 Trafficking in Persons Report - Korea, Democratic People's Republic of (Report).
- 2014 Trafficking in Persons Report - Korea, Democratic People's Republic of (Report).
- 2015 Trafficking in Persons Report - Korea, Democratic People's Republic of (Report).
- 2016 Trafficking in Persons Report - Korea, Democratic People's Republic of (Report).
- 2017 Trafficking in Persons Report - Korea, Democratic People's Republic of (Report). Archived from the original on 2018-03-23.
- 2018 Trafficking in Persons Report - Korea, Democratic People's Republic of (Report). Archived from the original on 2018-07-29.

== Human rights organizations specialized on North Korea (based in South Korea) ==
=== Citizens' Alliance for North Korean Human Rights ===
The Citizens' Alliance for North Korean Human Rights (NKHR; South Korea-based nonprofit founded in 1996) works in researching and disseminating information about the human rights violations in North Korea. It also runs assistance programs for North Korean defectors.

- Voice From The North Korean Gulag (Report). 1998.
- Hosaniak, Joanna (2004). Prisoners of Their Own Country :North Korea in the eyes of the Witnesses (PDF) (Report). Archived (PDF) from the original on 2018-08-25.
- Heo, Man-ho, ed. (2005). Class and Gender Discrimination in North Korea (Report).
- Lee, Young-Hwan; et al. (2008). North Korea: Republic of Torture (PDF) (Report). Archived (PDF) from the original on 2018-03-18.
- Lee, Young-Hwan; et al. (2009). Child is King of the Country (PDF) (Report). ISBN 9788988378151. Archived (PDF) from the original on 2018-08-25.
- Heo, Man-Ho (2009). The Last Outposts of Slavery of the Past XX Century (PDF) (Report). ISBN 978-89-88378-13-7. Archived (PDF) from the original on 2018-08-25.
- Bang, Sanghee; et al. (2009). Survival under Torture (PDF) (Report). ISBN 978-89-88378-14-4. Archived (PDF) from the original on 2018-08-25.
- Hosaniak, Joanna; et al. (2009). Flowers, Guns and Women on Bikes (PDF) (Report). ISBN 978-89-88378-16-8.
- Hosaniak, Joanna; et al. (2015). Status of Women's Rights in the Context of Socio-Economic Changes in the DPRK (Report). ISBN 978-89-88378-33-5. Archived from the original on 2018-03-15.
- Bang, Sanghee; et al. (2015). The Battered Wheel of the Revolution (PDF) (Report). ISBN 978-89-88378-28-1. Archived (PDF) from the original on 2018-03-15.

=== Database Center for North Korean Human Rights ===
The Database Center for North Korean Human Rights (NKDB; South Korea-based nonprofit founded in 2003) specializes in collecting and analyzing and maintaining a database of human rights abuses, which as of 2017 included the accounts of over 40,000 individuals and 60,000 cases of human rights violations.

==== Annual general reports ====
- 2007 White Paper on North Korean Human Rights (Report). 2007.
- 2008 White Paper on North Korean Human Rights (Report). Jul 22, 2008.
- 2009 White Paper on North Korean Human Rights (Report). Sep 11, 2009.
- 2010 White Paper on North Korean Human Rights (Report). Aug 5, 2010.
- 2011 White Paper on North Korean Human Rights (Report). Aug 31, 2011.
- 2012 White Paper on North Korean Human Rights (Report). Aug 31, 2012.
- 2013 White Paper on North Korean Human Rights (Report). Dec 20, 2013.
- 2014 White Paper on North Korean Human Rights (Report). Nov 30, 2014.
- 2014 White Paper on North Korean Human Rights (Report). Dec 22, 2014.
- 2015 White Paper on North Korean Human Rights (Report). Dec 16, 2015.

==== Religious freedom ====
- 2008 White Paper on Religious Freedom in North Korea (Report).
- 2009 White Paper on Religious Freedom in North Korea (Report).
- 2010 White Paper on Religious Freedom in North Korea (Report).
- 2011 White Paper on Religious Freedom in North Korea (Report).
- 2012 White Paper on Religious Freedom in North Korea (Report).
- 2013 White Paper on Religious Freedom in North Korea (Report).
- 2014 White Paper on Religious Freedom in North Korea (Report).
- 2015 White Paper on Religious Freedom in North Korea (Report).
- 2016 White Paper on Religious Freedom in North Korea (Report).

==== Other thematic reports ====
- Political Prison Camps in North Korea Today (Report). Jul 20, 2011.
- North Korean Defectors in China – Forced Repatriation and Human Rights Violations (Report). Jan 28, 2014.
- North Korean Human Rights Case Report: Victims' Voices Vol. 1, Vol. 2 (Report). Oct 10, 2013.
- An Evaluation Report of the North Korean Human Rights Situation after the 2014 UN Commission of Inquiry Report -Based on an Analysis of NKDB's Database- (Report). Mar 2016.
- North Korean Political Prison Camps: A Catalogue of Political Prison Camp Staff, Detainees, and Victims of Enforced Disappearance (Report). Aug 2016.
- Conditions of Labor and Human Rights: North Korean Overseas Laborers in Russia (Report). Dec 2016.
- The UN Universal Periodic Review and the DPRK: Monitoring of North Korea's Implementation of Its Recommendations (Report). Jul 2017.

=== Other ===
- Human Rights Violations In North Korea (PSCORE's Human Rights Report 2013) (PDF) (Report). South Korea: People for Successful Corean Reunification. April 18, 2014. Archived (PDF) from the original on 2018-08-26.
- Nam, Bada; et al. (2014). PSCORE's Submission To The United Nations Universal Periodic Review (UPR) – 2014 (PDF) (Report). South Korea: People for Successful Corean Reunification. Archived (PDF) from the original on 2018-08-26.
- North Korean workers overseas: State-sponsored slavery (PDF) (Report). South Korea: People for Successful Corean Reunification. 2015. Archived (PDF) from the original on 2018-08-26.
- Child Labor in the DPRK, Education and Indoctrination UNCRC Alternative Report to the 5th Periodic Report for the Democratic People's Republic of Korea (DPRK) (PDF) (Report). South Korea: People for Successful Corean Reunification. February 2017. Archived (PDF) from the original on 2018-08-26.
- Mapping Crimes Against Humanity in North Korea: Mass Graves, Killing Sites and Documentary Evidence (PDF) (Report). South Korea: Transitional Justice Working Group. July 2017. Archived (PDF) from the original on 2017-09-20.

== Human rights organizations specialized on North Korea (based outside South Korea) ==
=== Committee for Human Rights in North Korea (U.S.-based) ===
Cover of the 2012 edition of The Hidden Gulag - The Lives and Voices of 'Those Who are Sent to the Mountains'

The Committee for Human Rights in North Korea (HRNK; U.S.-based non-profit established in 2001) is known for its original research based on its adept use of satellite imagery, defector accounts, and even information coming directly from inside the country. Its published research has been relied upon as sources in reports issued by the United Nations and governments. HRNK has issued three types of reports: reports analyzing the situation on prison camps, reports on other human rights issues in the country, and reports on North Korea's leadership and institutions, as well as policy briefings addressed at the international community. The first two types of reports are listed here.

==== Reports on prison camps ====
- Hawk, David (2003). The Hidden Gulag, First Edition (PDF) (Report). Archived (PDF) from the original on 2018-06-12.
- Hawk, David (2012). The Hidden Gulag, Second Edition (PDF) (Report). Archived (PDF) from the original on 2014-07-02.
- Bermudez, Joseph S. Jr.; et al. (2012). North Korea's Camp No. 22 (PDF) (Report). Archived (PDF) from the original on 2016-10-19.
- Hawk, David (2013). North Korea's Hidden Gulag: Interpreting Reports of Changes in the Prison Camps (PDF) (Report). Archived (PDF) from the original on 2018-08-03.
- Farfour, Micah; et al. (2013). North Korea's Camp No. 25 (PDF) (Report). Archived (PDF) from the original on 2016-04-02.
- Bermudez Jr, Joseph S. (2014). North Korea's Camp No. 25, Update (PDF) (Report). Archived (PDF) from the original on 2015-06-07.
- Bermudez, Joseph S. Jr.; et al. (2015). North Korea - Imagery Analysis of Camp 15 (PDF) (Report). Archived (PDF) from the original on 2015-06-07.
- Scarlatoiu, Greg; Bermudez S. Jr, Joseph (2015). Unusual Activity at the Kanggon Military Training Area in North Korea: Evidence of Execution by Anti-aircraft Machine Guns? (PDF) (Report). Archived (PDF) from the original on 2017-07-11.
- Bermudez, Joseph S. Jr.; et al. (2015). Imagery Analysis of Camp 15 "Yodok" Closure of the "Revolutionizing Zone (PDF) (Report). Archived (PDF) from the original on 2017-06-11.
- Hawk, David (2015). The Hidden Gulag IV: Gender Repression and Prison Disappearances (PDF) (Report). Archived (PDF) from the original on 2018-03-18.
- Bermudez, Joseph S. Jr.; et al. (2015). North Korea Imagery Analysis of Camp 16 (PDF) (Report). Archived (PDF) from the original on 2016-09-14.
- Bermudez, Joseph S. Jr.; et al. (2015). North Korea Imagery Analysis of Camp 14 (PDF) (Report). Archived (PDF) from the original on 2016-09-14.
- Bermudez, Joseph S. Jr.; et al. (2016). North Korea: Ch'oma-bong Restricted Area (PDF) (Report). Archived (PDF) from the original on 2016-05-07.
- Kim, Kwang-jin (2016). Gulag, Inc.: The Use of Forced Labor in North Korea's Export Industries (PDF) (Report). Archived (PDF) from the original on 2018-03-18.
- Bermudez, Joseph S. Jr.; Eley, Mike (2016). North Korea: Kyo-hwa-so No. 12 (PDF) (Report). Archived (PDF) from the original on 2016-09-09.
- Bermudez, Joseph S. Jr.; Scarlatoiu, Greg (2016). North Korea: Flooding at Kyo-hwa-so No. 12 (PDF) (Report). Archived (PDF) from the original on 2018-03-18.
- Bermudez, Joseph S. Jr.; et al. (2016). North Korea Camp No. 25 Update 2 (PDF) (Report). Archived (PDF) from the original on 2017-11-20.
- Hawk, David; Mortwedt Oh, Amanda (2017). The Parallel Gulag: North Korea's 'An-jeon-bu' Prison Camps (PDF) (Report). Archived (PDF) from the original on 2018-02-15.
- Collins, Robert; et al. (2017). From Cradle to Grave: The Path of North Korean Innocents (PDF) (Report). Archived (PDF) from the original on 2018-02-18.

==== Thematic reports ====
- Haggard, Stephan; Noland, Marcus (2005). Hunger and Human Rights: The Politics of Famine in North Korea (PDF) (Report). ISBN 0-9771-1110-5. Archived (PDF) from the original on 2013-11-07.
- Kim, Kwang Jin (2009). After Kim Jong-il: Can We Hope for Better Human Rights Protection? (PDF) (Report). Archived (PDF) from the original on 2016-03-23.
- Lives for Sale: Personal Accounts of Women Fleeing North Korea to China (PDF) (Report). 2009. Archived (PDF) from the original on 2016-06-07.
- Yamamoto, Yoshi; et al. (2011). Taken! North Korea's Criminal Abduction of Citizens in Other Countries (PDF) (Report). ISBN 978-0-9771111-3-8. Archived (PDF) from the original on 2015-07-18.
- Gause, Ken E. (2012). Coercion, Control, Surveillance, and Punishment: An Examination of the North Korean Police State (PDF) (Report). ISBN 978-0985648015. Archived (PDF) from the original on 2016-05-26.
- Collins, Robert (2012). Marked For Life: Songbun, North Korea's Social Classification System (PDF) (Report). ISBN 978-0985648008. Archived (PDF) from the original on 2018-08-04.
- Coercion, Control, Surveillance, and Punishment: An Examination of the North Korean Police State (updated) (PDF) (Report). 2013. ISBN 978-0985648015. Archived (PDF) from the original on 2016-06-03.
- Stanton, Joshua (2015). Arsenal of Terror - North Korea, State Sponsor of Terrorism (PDF) (Report). ISBN 978-0-9856480-3-9. Archived (PDF) from the original on 2015-06-27.
- Collins, Robert (2016). Pyongyang Republic: North Korea's Capital of Human Rights Denial (PDF) (Report). ISBN 978-0985648060. Archived (PDF) from the original on 2017-02-02.

=== Other ===
- Kagan, Richard; Oh, Matthew; Weissbrodt, David (1988). Human Rights in the Democratic People's Republic of Korea (PDF) (Report). United States: Minnesota Lawyers International Human Rights Committee (later renamed to The Advocates for Human Rights), and Asia Watch. ISBN 0-929293-03-7. Archived from the original on 2018-07-18.(, part 2, appendices)
- Illicit Drugs and Human Rights (Report). United States: North Korea Strategy Center. 2016.
- United Nations Universal Period Review (UPR) - Joint Submission by NKSC and Free the North Korean Gulag (FNKG) (PDF) (Report). United States: North Korea Strategy Center. 2013. Archived from the original (PDF) on 2015-06-24.
- The Conditions of North Korean Overseas Labor (PDF) (Report). United States: North Korea Strategy Center. 2013. Archived from the original (PDF) on 2015-06-24.
- Burt, James; et al. (2018). Us Too: Sexual Violence Against North Korean Women and Girls (PDF) (Report). United Kingdom: Korea Future Initiative. Archived from the original (PDF) on 2018-09-10.

== Human rights organizations ==
=== Amnesty International ===
Amnesty International (AI; based in the United Kingdom, established in 1961) annual report The state of the world's human rights initially included a brief mention of most countries, growing in later years to devoting 1-2 pages to the analysis of the situation of human rights in each country, including North Korea in 1977. Through the 1970s, 1980s the organization noted that its ability to report on human rights in the country was severely hampered by the opacity of the regime, and only being able to recount some scant reports. This began to change in the 1990s when some more information became available. Also since that point AI has also issued other stand-alone reports specific to human rights issues in North Korea.

==== Annual general reports ====
Annual general reports 1977-1999
- 1977 Amnesty International Report (PDF) (Report). p. 192. Archived from the original (PDF) on 2018-08-25.
- 1978 Amnesty International Report (PDF) (Report). p. 170. Archived from the original (PDF) on 2018-08-25.
- 1979 Amnesty International Report (PDF) (Report). p. 95. Archived (PDF) from the original on 2018-04-26.
- 1980 Amnesty International Report (PDF) (Report). p. 206. Archived (PDF) from the original on 2018-08-25.
- 1981 Amnesty International Report (PDF) (Report). p. 228. Archived from the original (PDF) on 2018-08-25.
- 1982 Amnesty International Report (PDF) (Report). p. 208. Archived (PDF) from the original on 2018-03-11.
- 1983 Amnesty International Report (PDF) (Report). p. 206. Archived (PDF) from the original on 2017-11-07.
- 1984 Amnesty International Report (PDF) (Report). p. 232. Archived (PDF) from the original on 2018-08-25.
- 1985 Amnesty International Report (PDF) (Report). p. 233. Archived (PDF) from the original on 2018-08-25.
- 1986 Amnesty International Report (PDF) (Report). p. 233. Archived (PDF) from the original on 2018-08-25.
- 1987 Amnesty International Report (PDF) (Report). p. 243. Archived (PDF) from the original on 2018-08-25.
- 1988 Amnesty International Report (PDF) (Report). p. 164. Archived (PDF) from the original on 2018-08-25.
- 1989 Amnesty International Report (PDF) (Report). p. 181. Archived (PDF) from the original on 2018-08-25.
- 1990 Amnesty International Report (PDF) (Report). p. 141. Archived (PDF) from the original on 2018-08-25.
- 1991 Amnesty International Report (PDF) (Report). p. 137. Archived (PDF) from the original on 2018-08-25.
- 1992 Amnesty International Report (PDF) (Report). p. 161. Archived (PDF) from the original on 2018-08-25.
- 1993 Amnesty International Report (PDF) (Report). p. 180. Archived (PDF) from the original on 2018-08-25.
- 1994 Amnesty International Report (PDF) (Report). p. 184.
- 1995 Amnesty International Report (PDF) (Report). p. 183. Archived (PDF) from the original on 2018-08-25.
- 1996 Amnesty International Report (PDF) (Report). p. 198. Archived (PDF) from the original on 2018-08-25.
- 1997 Amnesty International Report (PDF) (Report). pp. 205–206. Archived (PDF) from the original on 2018-08-25.
- 1998 Amnesty International Report (PDF) (Report). pp. 223–224. Archived (PDF) from the original on 2017-10-06.
- 1999 Amnesty International Report (PDF) (Report). pp. 223–225. Archived (PDF) from the original on 2018-08-25.

Annual general reports 2000–present

- 2000 Amnesty International Report (PDF) (Report). p. 148. Archived (PDF) from the original on 2018-08-25.
- 2001 Amnesty International Report (PDF) (Report). p. 148. Archived (PDF) from the original on 2018-08-25.
- 2002 Amnesty International Report (PDF) (Report). p. 146. Archived (PDF) from the original on 2018-08-25.
- 2003 Amnesty International Report (PDF) (Report). p. 150. Archived (PDF) from the original on 2018-08-25.
- 2004 Amnesty International Report (PDF) (Report). pp. 166–167. Archived (PDF) from the original on 2018-08-25.
- 2005 Amnesty International Report (PDF) (Report). pp. 151–152.
- 2006 Amnesty International Report (PDF) (Report). p. 160. Archived (PDF) from the original on 2018-04-22.
- 2007 Amnesty International Report - The State of the World's Human Rights (PDF) (Report). pp. 159–160. Archived (PDF) from the original on 2018-08-25.
- 2008 Amnesty International Report - The State of the World's Human Rights (PDF) (Report). p. 180. Archived (PDF) from the original on 2018-08-25.
- 2009 Amnesty International Report - The State of the World's Human Rights (PDF) (Report). p. 199. Archived (PDF) from the original on 2015-03-13.
- 2010 Amnesty International Report - The State of the World's Human Rights (PDF) (Report). pp. 198–199. Archived (PDF) from the original on 2015-03-10.
- 2011 Amnesty International Report - The State of the World's Human Rights (PDF) (Report). p. 197. Archived (PDF) from the original on 2015-09-12.
- 2012 Amnesty International Report - The State of the World's Human Rights (PDF) (Report). pp. 204–205. Archived (PDF) from the original on 2015-09-12.
- 2013 Amnesty International Report - The State of the World's Human Rights (PDF) (Report). p. 149. Archived (PDF) from the original on 2016-01-06.
- Amnesty International Report 2014/15 - The State of the World's Human Rights (PDF) (Report). pp. 216–217. Archived (PDF) from the original on 2017-10-10.
- Amnesty International Report 2015/16 - The State of the World's Human Rights (PDF) (Report). pp. 217–219. Archived (PDF) from the original on 2018-01-24.
- Amnesty International Report 2016/17- The State of the World's Human Rights (PDF) (Report). pp. 219–220. Archived (PDF) from the original on 2017-10-24.
- Amnesty International Report 2017/18 - The State of the World's Human Rights (PDF) (Report). pp. 225–226. Archived (PDF) from the original on 2018-04-19.

==== Thematic reports ====
- North Korea: Summary of Amnesty International's Concerns (ASA 24/003/1993) (PDF) (Report). 13 October 1993. Archived (PDF) from the original on 2018-08-25.
- North Korea: the Death Penalty (ASA 24/001/1994) (PDF) (Report). 31 March 1994. Archived (PDF) from the original on 2018-08-26.
- North Korea: New Information About Political Prisoners (ASA 24/005/1994) (PDF) (Report). 31 May 1994. Archived (PDF) from the original on 2018-08-26.
- Democratic People's Republic of Korea (North Korea): Human Rights Violations Behind Closed Doors (ASA 24/012/1995) (PDF) (Report). 20 December 1995.
- Democratic People's Republic of Korea/Russian Federation: Pursuit, Intimidation and Abuse of North Korean Refugees and Workers (ASA 24/006/1996) (PDF) (Report). 8 September 1996.
- Democratic People's Republic of Korea (North Korea): Public Executions: Converging Testimonies (ASA 24/001/1997) (PDF) (Report). 22 January 1997.
- Democratic People's Republic of Korea (North Korea): Conditions of Detention (ASA 24/003/1999) (PDF) (Report). 31 May 1999.
- Democratic People's Republic of Korea: Persecuting the Starving: the Plight of North Koreans Fleeing to China (ASA 24/003/2000) (PDF) (Report). 15 December 2000.
- North Korea: Starved of Rights: Human Rights and the Food Crisis in the Democratic People's Republic of Korea (North Korea) (ASA 24/003/2004) (PDF) (Report). 17 January 2004. Archived (PDF) from the original on 2016-06-23.
- Democratic People's Republic of Korea: Submission to the UN Universal Periodic Review: Sixth Session of the UPR Working Group of the Human Rights Council, November - December 2009 (ASA 24/008/2009) (PDF) (Report). 20 April 2009. Archived (PDF) from the original on 2018-08-25.
- North Korea: the Crumbling State of Health Care in North Korea (ASA 24/001/2010) (PDF) (Report). 15 July 2010. Archived (PDF) from the original on 2018-08-25.
- North Korea: New Satellite Images Show Blurring of Political Prison Camp and Villages in North Korea (ASA 24/004/2013) (PDF) (Report). 7 March 2013. Archived (PDF) from the original on 2015-03-14.
- Democratic People's Republic of Korea: New Leadership but Human Rights Crisis Continues: Amnesty International Submission to the UN Universal Periodic Review, April-may 2014 (ASA 24/009/2013) (PDF) (Report). 1 October 2013. Archived (PDF) from the original on 2015-03-12.
- North Korea: New Satellite Images Show Continued Investment in the Infrastructure of Repression (Index number: ASA 24/010/2013) (PDF) (Report). 5 December 2013. Archived (PDF) from the original on 2015-03-12.
- North Korea: Connection Denied: Restrictions on Mobile Phones and Outside Information in North Korea (ASA 24/3373/2016) (PDF) (Report). 9 March 2016. Archived (PDF) from the original on 2016-03-11.
- North Korea 2017/2018 (Report). Archived from the original on 2017-02-22.

==== Submissions to the United Nations ====
- Democratic People's Republic of Korea: Submission to the UN Universal Periodic Review: Sixth Session of the UPR Working Group of the Human Rights Council, November - December 2009 (ASA 24/008/2009) (PDF) (Report). Amnesty International. 20 April 2009. Archived (PDF) from the original on 2018-08-25.
- Democratic People's Republic of Korea: New Leadership but Human Rights Crisis Continues: Amnesty International Submission to the UN Universal Periodic Review, April-may 2014 (ASA 24/009/2013) (PDF) (Report). Amnesty International. 1 October 2013. Archived (PDF) from the original on 2015-03-12.
- North Korea: Amnesty International's submission to the United Nations Committee on the Rights of the Child (Index number: ASA 24/6500/2017) (PDF) (Report). Amnesty International. 15 August 2017. Archived (PDF) from the original on 2018-03-11.
- North Korea: Amnesty International's submission to the United Nations Committee on the Rights of the Child (Index number: ASA 24/6500/2017) (PDF) (Report). 15 August 2017. Archived (PDF) from the original on 2018-03-11.

=== Human Rights Watch ===
Human Rights Watch publishes annually a World Report. Below are listed the sections of those annual reports that focus on the situation in North Korea. HRW has produced world reports since 1989 covering a limited number of countries, and it began to devote a section to the DPRK in 2004.

==== Annual general reports ====
- Human Rights in North Korea (DPRK: The Democratic People's Republic of Korea) (Report). 2004. Archived from the original on 2018-01-11.
- World Report 2005: North Korea events of 2005 (Report). 2006. Archived from the original on 2016-11-12.
- World Report 2006: North Korea events of 2006 (Report). 2007. Archived from the original on 2016-10-18.
- World Report 2007: North Korea events of 2007 (Report). 2008. Archived from the original on 2018-08-25.
- World Report 2008: North Korea events of 2008 (Report). 2009. Archived from the original on 2018-04-24.
- World Report 2009: North Korea events of 2009 (Report). 2010. Archived from the original on 2018-01-21.
- World Report 2010: North Korea events of 2010 (Report). 2011. Archived from the original on 2018-06-09.
- World Report 2011: North Korea events of 2011 (Report). 2012. Archived from the original on 2018-01-20.
- World Report 2012: North Korea events of 2012 (Report). 2013. Archived from the original on 2018-03-23.
- World Report 2013: North Korea events of 2013 (Report). 2014. Archived from the original on 2014-07-07.
- World Report 2014: North Korea events of 2014 (Report). 2015. Archived from the original on 2018-05-16.
- World Report 2016: North Korea events of 2016 (Report). 2017. Archived from the original on 2018-04-07.
- World Report 2017: North Korea events of 2017 (Report). 2018. Archived from the original on 2018-02-23.

==== Thematic reports ====
- The invisible exodus: North Koreans in the People's Republic of China (PDF) (Report). November 2002. Archived (PDF) from the original on 2013-07-23.
- North Korea: Harsher Policies against Border-Crossers (Report). March 5, 2007. Archived from the original on 2018-06-27.
- North Korea: Workers' Rights at the Kaesong Industrial Complex (PDF) (Report). 2006. Archived (PDF) from the original on 2018-08-25.
- A Matter of Survival - The North Korean Government's Control of Food and the Risk of Hunger (PDF) (Report). 2006. Archived (PDF) from the original on 2017-09-16.

=== Other ===
- North Korea - Case to Answer - A Call to Act (PDF) (Report). Christian Solidarity Worldwide. 2007. Archived (PDF) from the original on 2017-03-26.
- Kang Muico, Norma (2007). Forced Labor in North Korean Prison Camps (PDF) (Report). Anti-Slavery International. Archived (PDF) from the original on 2017-06-27.
- The death penalty in North Korea - In the machinery of a totalitarian State (PDF) (Report). International Federation for Human Rights. May 20, 2013. Archived (PDF) from the original on 2016-09-21.
- Total Denial: Violations of Freedom of Religion or Belief in North Korea (PDF) (Report). Christian Solidarity Worldwide. 2016. Archived (PDF) from the original on 2018-08-25.
- Breuker, Remco E.; van Gardingen, Imke (2017). Pervasive, punitive and predetermined: understanding modern slavery in North Korea (PDF) (Report). Walk Free Foundation and Leiden University. Archived (PDF) from the original on 2018-08-25.
- Movies, markets and mass surveillance: human rights North Korea after a decade of change (PDF) (Report). Christian Solidarity Worldwide. 2017. Archived (PDF) from the original on 2018-08-25.

== Reports by other kinds of organizations ==
=== Bar associations ===
- White Paper on Human Rights in North Korea (Report). Korean Bar Association. 2010.
- Report on Human Rights in North Korea (Report). Korean Bar Association, International Bar Association . 2014. Archived from the original on 2018-05-15.
- Inquiry on Crimes Against Humanity in North Korean Political Prisons (Report). International Bar Association . 2017. Archived from the original on 2018-06-12.
- The NGO Report of the Korean Bar Association for the 68th session of CEDAW Pre-Sessional Working Group (PDF) (Report). Korean Bar Association. 2017. Archived (PDF) from the original on 2018-08-25.

== See also ==
- Human rights in North Korea
- Report of the Commission of Inquiry on Human Rights in the Democratic People's Republic of Korea
- North Korean studies
- Media coverage of North Korea
- Books about North Korea (category)
