= Capital punishment in North Korea =

Capital punishment is a legal penalty in North Korea. It is used for many offenses, such as grand theft, murder, rape, drug smuggling, treason, espionage, political dissent, defection, piracy, distribution of media not approved by the government and proselytizing religious beliefs that contradict the practiced Juche ideology. Owing to the secrecy of the North Korean government, working knowledge of the topic depends heavily on anonymous sources, accounts of defectors (both relatives of victims, and former members of the government) and reports by Radio Free Asia, a United States government-funded news service that operates in East Asia. The country allegedly carries out public executions, which, if true, makes North Korea one of the few countries that still performs public executions, alongside Iran, Afghanistan, and Somalia but this has been disputed by some defector accounts.

== Reported executions ==
The South-Korean-based Database Center for North Korean Human Rights has collected unverified testimony on 1,193 historic executions in North Korea through 2009. Amnesty International reported that there were 105 executions between 2007 and 2012. The Foreign Policy periodical estimated there were 60 executions in 2010. In October 2001, the North Korean government told the UN Human Rights Committee that "only 13" executions had occurred since 1998 and that no public execution had occurred since 1992.

On December 13, 2013, North Korean state media announced the execution of Jang Sung-taek, the uncle by marriage of North Korea's leader Kim Jong Un. The South Korean National Intelligence Service believes that two of Jang Sung-taek closest aides, Lee Yong-ha and Jang Soo-keel, were executed in mid-November 2013.

In 2014, the United Nations Human Rights Council created a Commission of inquiry on human rights in the Democratic People's Republic of Korea, investigating and documenting alleged instances of executions carried out with or without trial, publicly or secretly, in response to political and other crimes that are often not among the most serious. The Commission determined that these systematic acts, if true, rise to the level of crimes against humanity.

=== List of reported executions ===
Date of execution	Convict	Crime	Method	Source
May 2026	Two unnamed men	Distributing South Korean media	Public execution; method unspecified	Daily NK
February 2025	Kim brothers and Ri	Escape attempt	Public execution by machine gun fire	Radio Free Asia
January 10, 2025	Two nuclear power plant researchers	Failing to meet technical targets set by the Central Committee	Unspecified	Daily NK
August 31, 2024	Ri (39F) and Kang (43F)	Aiding an escape attempt	Public execution	NDTV
August 2024	20–30 party officials	Corruption and dereliction of duty in failure to prevent the Yalu river flooding, which killed 5,000 people	Unspecified	Newsweek
December 19, 2023	Unnamed 23-year-old man	Murder–robbery	Public execution by firing squad	Radio Free Asia
September 25, 2023	Unnamed 40-year-old man	Stealing medicine	Public execution by firing squad	Radio Free Asia
August 30, 2023	Nine unnamed people	Smuggling beef	Public execution by firing squad	Radio Free Asia
March 2023	Unnamed pregnant woman	Political dissent	Unspecified	Hindustan Times
March 2023	Six unnamed teenagers	Watching South Korean movies and using drugs	Execution by shooting	Hindustan Times
October 2022	Two unnamed teenagers	Distributing South Korean movies	Public execution by firing squad	Radio Free Asia
October 2022	Unnamed teenager	Murder of stepmother	Public execution by firing squad	Radio Free Asia
April 2022	Unnamed 22-year-old man	Distributing South Korean media	Public execution by firing squad	South Korea's Unification Ministry, BBC
January 2022	Unnamed man and woman	Distributing South Korean movies	Public execution by firing squad	Daily NK
March 2, 2021	Three unnamed men and one unnamed woman	Distributing South Korean movies	Public execution by firing squad	Daily NK
July 20, 2020	Six unnamed men	Sex trafficking	Public execution by shooting	Radio Free Asia
May 2020	Unnamed woman and man	Escape attempt	Execution by shooting	Radio Free Asia
April 2020	Three unnamed men	Theft	Execution by shooting	Radio Free Asia
February 2020	Unnamed man	Quarantine violation	Execution by shooting	
March 2019	Two unnamed women	Fortune-telling	Public execution by shooting	
January 10, 2019	Unnamed man	Murder of prison guard	Execution by shooting	
December 2018	Unnamed man	Corruption	Public execution by shooting	
December 2018	Unnamed person	Fortune telling	Public execution; method unspecified	
November 17, 2018	Unnamed woman	Fortune telling	Execution by shooting	Daily NK
2018	Male military officer	Embezzlement	Unspecified	
2018	Two unnamed people	Unspecified	Public execution by shooting	KINU
2018	Unnamed woman	Unspecified	Public execution by shooting	KINU
February or March 2018	Unnamed man	Unspecified	Public execution by shooting	KINU
January 2018	Unnamed woman	Unspecified	Public execution by shooting	KINU
January 2018	Unnamed woman in her 30s	Drug-related murder	Public execution by shooting	KINU
2017	Unnamed man	Distributing South Korean movies	Public execution by shooting	KINU
December 2017	Unnamed woman	Unspecified	Public execution by shooting	KINU
April 2017	One man	Extortion, murder, theft	Secret execution; method unspecified	Daily NK
February 27, 2017	Five unnamed men	Making false report	Execution by shooting	
February 2017	20 unnamed people	Watching South Korean movies and drug trading	Public execution by shooting	KINU
July 2016	Kim Yong-jin	Having bad posture and sleeping during meetings	Execution by shooting	
2016	Unnamed man	Human trafficking	Public execution by shooting	KINU
May 2015	Choe Yong-gon	Treason	Unspecified	BBC
March 2015	Five men in their 30s and 40s	Watching South Korean movies and drug trade	Public execution by shooting	KINU
2015	Six people	Conducting Christian worship	Execution by shooting	
October 2014	Three unnamed men	Distributing South Korean movies	Public execution by shooting	KINU
2014	Two unnamed men	Distributing South Korean movies and procuring prostitution	Execution by shooting	KINU
2014	Unnamed man	Distributing South Korean movies and drug trading	Public execution by shooting	KINU
2014	Unspecified	Conducting Shamanism	Unspecified	USCIRF
2014	49-year-old man	Calling relative in South Korea	Unspecified	
2013	Two university students	Watching South Korean adult videos	Execution by shooting	KINU
December 12, 2013	Jang Song-thaek and 7 unnamed men	Treason	Execution by shooting	KCNA
November 2013	30-year-old man	Drugs, illegal video recordings, and rape	Public execution by shooting	KINU
October 2013	Three people (including one man and one woman)	Selling drugs	Public execution by shooting	KINU
January 2013	Two men	South Korean video recordings	Unspecified	KINU
December 4, 2011	Three men and one woman	Selling drugs	Public execution by shooting	KINU
September 2011	A lesbian couple	Corruption of public morals	Unspecified	
July 2011	45-year-old man	Selling drugs	Public execution by shooting	KINU
April 2011	Child and Grandmother	Conducting Christian worship	Execution by firing squad	
January 3, 2011	Unnamed man and unnamed woman	Treason	Execution by shooting	
October 2010	Two men and two women	Human trafficking	Public execution by shooting	KINU
July 2010	Two men and four women	Human trafficking	Public execution by shooting	KINU
May 2010	Unnamed man	Selling South Korean compact discs	Public execution by shooting	KINU
March 17, 2010	Pak Nam-gi	Treason	Execution by shooting	YNA
February 2010	Unnamed man	Rape of a minor	Public execution by shooting	KINU
November 2009	Four people	Human trafficking	Public execution by shooting	KINU
September 2009	Four people	Human trafficking	Public execution by shooting	KINU
July 2009	34-year-old man	Rape and murder	Public execution by shooting	KINU
June 2009	Unnamed man	Rape	Public execution by shooting	KINU
May 2009	Two men in their 20s and one woman in her 40s	Aiding escape attempt	Public execution by shooting	KINU
October 2008	Unnamed woman	Selling South Korean compact discs	Public execution	KINU
September 2008	50-year-old man	Selling drugs	Public execution	KINU
Summer 2008	Four men and one woman	Selling drugs	Public execution by shooting	KINU
May 2008	26-year-old man	Human trafficking	Public execution by firing squad	KINU
March 2008	Three women	Human trafficking	Public execution	KINU
30 January 2008	Seven people	Selling drugs	Public execution	KINU
January 2008	Unnamed man	Murdering a four-year-old child	Public execution	KINU
2007	Seven people	Stealing and selling rice and gasoline	Public execution	KINU
2007	Man and woman	Smuggling protected trees to China	Public execution	KINU
December 2007	Kim Young-man	Selling drugs	Public execution	KINU
26 December 2007	59-year-old man and another man	Selling sex videotapes and a South Korean movie DVD	Public execution	KINU
25 December 2007	Three men, including a 45-year-old and a woman	Selling drugs	Public execution	KINU
22 December 2007	Four unnamed men	Smuggling	Public execution (2), secret execution (2)	KINU
November 2007	Unnamed official	Taking bribes	Public execution	KINU
5 October 2007	75-year-old man	Converting phone lines to facilitate calls with outside world	Public execution	KINU
Early September 2007	Unnamed man	Smuggling lumber	Public execution by firing squad	KINU
September 2007	Army sergeant	Murder-robbery	Public execution by firing squad	KINU
August 2007 or later	Mak-kong (50M)	Gambling	Public execution	KINU
July 2007	41-year-old man	Receiving money from South Korea	Public execution	KINU
July 2007	College student	Murdering his pregnant girlfriend	Public execution	KINU
July 2007	Unnamed man	Selling drugs	Public execution	KINU
25 July 2007	Man and woman	Gambling, drug selling, selling sex magazines and videotapes, as well as embezzlement	Public execution	KINU
July 10, 2007	Unnamed woman	Stealing and murder of a 12-year-old girl	Execution by shooting	
15 June 2007	Two women	Human trafficking	Public execution	KINU
May 17, 2007	Two guards	Selling drugs and theft	Public execution	
February 2007	40-year-old man	Human trafficking	Secret execution	KINU
2006	26-year-old man	Human trafficking and collecting gold	Public execution	KINU
19 May 2006	Ex-soldier	Stealing copper lines	Public execution	KINU
17 May 2006	Two unnamed people	Selling drugs and CDs	Public execution	KINU
2005	Unnamed man	Butchering a cow	Public execution	KINU
November 2005	Unnamed woman	Human trafficking	Public execution	KINU
August 2005	Company president (45M)	Selling copper lines	Public execution	KINU
15 April 2005	23-year-old man	Smuggling in a Bible	Public execution	KINU
April 2005	College student	Murder	Public execution	KINU
April 2005	Leader of a security platoon	Aiding escape	Public execution	KINU
March 2, 2005	Han Bok Nam	Illegal border crossing and human trafficking	Public execution by shooting	
March 1, 2005	Choi Jae Gon and Park Myung Gil	Transgression of the national border and human trafficking	Public execution by shooting	
February 28- March 1, 2005	Three men	Human trafficking	Public execution by shooting	
January 2005	32-year-old man	Listening to South Korean radio programs and singing South Korean songs	Public execution	KINU
2004	Unnamed man	Illegal sale of gold	Public execution	KINU
2004	Army cadet	Accidental killing	Public execution	KINU
2004	Unnamed man	Murder-robbery	Public execution	KINU
2004	Man and woman	Human trafficking	Public execution	KINU
2004	Unnamed woman	Human trafficking	Public execution	KINU
2004	Unnamed man	Corn theft	Public execution	KINU
November 2004	Teacher	Human trafficking of 13 students	Public execution	KINU
November 2004	Unnamed man	Selling and circulating South Korean videos	Public execution	KINU
September 2004	19-year-old man	Stealing a pig	Public execution	KINU
April 2004	Unnamed man	Fistfighting with a Safety Agent	Public execution by firing squad	KINU
March 2004	Unnamed woman	Human trafficking	Public execution	KINU
January 2004	Man and woman	Acting as stringers for the South Korea	Public execution	KINU
2003	51-year-old man	Escape attempt	Public execution by firing squad	KINU
July 2003	40-year-old man	Smuggling and selling copper products and jewelry	Public execution by firing squad	KINU
11 February 2003	Unnamed man	Practicing Christianity	Public execution	KINU
January 2003	Unnamed man	Killing his grandmother	Public execution	KINU
2002	Entire family (might refer to Lee Min Park case listed below)	Anti-state crimes	Unspecified	KINU
March 2002	Three members of the Lee Min Park family	Conducting Christian worship	Unspecified	
2000	12 people	Grain theft	Public execution	KINU
May 2000	Kim XX	Human trafficking	Public execution	KINU
1999	23-year-old woman	Crossing into China and engaging in illegal religious activities	Public execution	KINU
1999	Unnamed man	Butchering a cow	Public execution	KINU
Before October 1999	60-year old married couple	Escape attempt	Public execution	KINU
May 1999	Unnamed woman	Slave trade	Public execution	KINU
January 1999	Two women and a man	Singing decadent songs	Public execution	KINU
1998	Seven unnamed men	Banditry	Public execution	KINU
November 1998	Lim Chol-san and nine others	Butchering an animal	Public execution	KINU
November 1998	Lee Bom-jae	Trying to sell mushrooms in China	Public execution	KINU
April 1998	13 cadres from the Social Safety Agency	Unknown	Public execution by shooting	KINU
15 March 1998	Wife and husband	Assaulting an agent of the People's Security Agency	Public execution by shooting	KINU
February 1998	Six people	Slave trade	Public execution	KINU
1997	So Kwan-hui	Sabotage	Public execution by shooting	
1997	Kim Man-kum and another unnamed official	Espionage	Public execution by shooting	KINU
October 1997	Four unnamed teenagers	Streaking	Public execution	KINU
April 1997	Family of four	Selling human meat	Public execution	KINU
Early 1997	Choi Jong-gil and eight others	Theft	Public execution by shooting	KINU
1996	Hyun Chul-nam	Resisting arrest	Unknown	KINU
29 November 1996	Jang Hye-kyung (mother) and Shin Hee-keun (son)	Escape attempt	Public execution	KINU
December 1995	Family of five	Selling human meat	Public execution	KINU
September 1994	Suh Chol	Stealing copper	Public execution	KINU
November 1992	Chu Su Man (30)	Murder	Public execution by shooting	Amnesty International
Early 1990s	Unnamed man	Murder and rape	Public execution by shooting	Amnesty International
October 1991	Park Myung-sik	Twelve murders	Execution by firing squad	
1990	Suh Yong-soon (23F)	Trying to hide damaged products	Firing squad	KINU
1989	Kang Won-sook (21)	Desertion	Firing squad	KINU
August 1988	Ju Song Il	Murder	Public execution by shooting	Amnesty International
1988	Unnamed man	Embezzlement	Public execution by hanging	Amnesty International
1988	45-year-old man	Attempted murder	Public execution by hanging	Amnesty International
1987	Unnamed man	Murder or rape	Public execution by shooting	Amnesty International
1986	Unnamed man	Murder or rape	Public execution by shooting	Amnesty International
1985	Three unnamed man	Murder	Public execution by shooting	Amnesty International
1983 or 1982	One or two unnamed men	Rape and theft	Public execution	Amnesty International
1983 or 1982	Two brothers	Stealing rice from a train	Public execution	Amnesty International
1981	Woo In-hee	Affair with a man as Mistress of Kim Jong Il	Public execution by shooting	
Early 1980s	Two unnamed men	Unknown	Public execution by hanging	Amnesty International
1980	25 and 65-year-old man	Assault and rape	Public execution by shooting	Amnesty International
1975 or 1976	Unnamed man	Beating and crippling his wife	Public execution by shooting	Amnesty International
1974 or 1975	Two unnamed men	Banditry	Public execution by shooting	Amnesty International
1970	Two unnamed men	Banditry	Public execution by shooting	Amnesty International
1970	Unnamed man	Murder or rape	Public execution by shooting	Amnesty International

== Public executions ==
North Korea was alleged to have resumed public executions in October 2007 after they had declined in the years following 2000 amidst international criticism. Prominent supposedly executed criminals include officials convicted of drug trafficking and embezzlement. Common criminals convicted of crimes such as murder, robbery, rape, drug dealing, smuggling, piracy, vandalism, etc. have also been reported to be executed, mostly by firing squad. The country does not publicly release national crime statistics or reports on the levels of crimes. As of 2012, North Korea is allegedly one of four countries carrying out executions in public, the other three being Iran, Saudi Arabia and Somalia. However, according to defectors interviewed by The Diplomat in 2014, the practice of such activities had not occurred, at least in Hyesan since 2000.

In October 2007, a South Pyongan province factory chief convicted of making international phone calls from 13 phones he installed in his factory basement was supposedly executed by firing squad in front of a crowd of 150,000 people in a stadium, according to an unverified report from a South Korean aid agency called Good Friends. Good Friends also reported that six were killed in the rush as spectators left. In another unverified instance, 15 people were allegedly publicly executed for crossing the border into China.

A U.N. General Assembly committee has adopted a draft resolution, co-sponsored by more than 50 countries, expressing "very serious concern" at reports of widespread human rights violations in North Korea, including public executions. North Korea has condemned the draft, saying it is inaccurate and biased. The report was sent to the then 192-member General Assembly for a final vote.

In 2011, two people were allegedly executed in front of 500 spectators for handling propaganda leaflets floated across the border from South Korea, reportedly as part of an unverified campaign by former North Korean leader Kim Jong Il to tighten ideological control as he groomed his youngest son, Kim Jong Un, as the eventual successor.

In June 2019, a South Korean NGO the Transitional Justice Working Group released an unverified report "Mapping the Fate of the Dead" that suggested 318 sites in North Korea supposedly used by the government for public executions. According to the NGO, public executions have taken place near rivers, fields, markets, schools, and sports grounds. The report alleges that family members and children of those sentenced to death were forced to watch their executions.

== Capital punishment in prison camps ==
Amnesty International has alleged that torture and executions are widespread in political prisons in North Korea. Unverified testimonies describe secret and public executions in North Korean prisons by firing squad, decapitation or by hanging. Executions are allegedly used as a means of deterrence, often accompanied by torture.

== See also ==
- Human rights in North Korea
- Prisons in North Korea
- Persecution of Christians in North Korea
