= Hanawon =

South Korean resettlement facility

The Settlement Support Center for North Korean Refugees (Korean: 북한이탈주민정착지원사무소; Hanja: 北韓離脫住民定着支援事務所), commonly known as Hanawon (Korean: 하나원; "House of Unity"), is a South Korean facility for the "training for social adaptation" of North Korean defectors, preparing them for life in the South. Three months' stay in this facility is mandatory for all North Koreans arriving in the south, with residents unable to leave of their own free will.

== History ==
Hanawon opened on 8 July 1999, and is located about an hour south of Seoul in the countryside of Anseong, Gyeonggi Province. In her book Nothing To Envy: Ordinary Lives in North Korea, journalist Barbara Demick describes Hanawon as a cross between a trade school and a halfway house, and describes its purpose as teaching North Koreans how to live on their own in South Korea.

Originally built to accommodate around 200 people for a three-month resettlement program, in 2002 the facility's capacity was doubled to 400. In 2004, to mark the fifth anniversary of the program, a second facility opened south of Seoul.

== Operation ==
At Hanawon, a three-month curriculum is focused on three main goals: easing the socioeconomic and psychological anxiety of North Korean defectors; overcoming the barriers of cultural heterogeneity; and practical training for earning a livelihood in the South. Refugees relearn the peninsula's history (for example, the refugees are taught that the North started the Korean War), and take classes on human rights and the mechanics of democracy. They receive sex education, learn how to use an ATM, pay bills, drive a car, read the Latin alphabet and speak the South Korean dialect. They are taken on field trips to buy clothes, get haircuts, and eat at a food court.

Many refugees have poor teeth from malnutrition. Many also have depression and other psychological problems when they arrive at Hanawon. Thirty percent of female defectors in particular show signs of depression, which analysts attribute to, among other things, having experienced sexual abuse in North Korea, or as refugees in China.

Hanawon imposes heavy restrictions on the travel of North Korean defectors, because of security concerns, with barbed wire, security guards, and cameras. A defector who requested anonymity told The Korea Herald that Hanawon felt somewhat like a jail, since she could not freely go outside.

Upon completion of the Hanawon program, defectors find their own homes with a government subsidy. When Hanawon first opened, North Koreans were offered ₩36 million per person to resettle with ₩540,000 monthly afterward. As of 2018, they receive ₩7–32 million to resettle and ₩13–20 million for housing, both amounts depending on the conditions and size of the household. Following their completion of the Hanawon program, many defectors find additional assistance through civil society organizations, such as Liberty in North Korea, Database Center for North Korean Human Rights, and Saejowi.

== Incidents ==
On April 28, 2011, the South Korean Supreme Court upheld the original sentence of three and a half years in prison for a 64-year-old man named Mr. Han who was recruited by a North Korean spy agency and charged with extracting information on defectors. Han was accused of investigating Hanawon, a North Korean defector resettlement support organization, and North Korean military defector groups under the direction of the North Korean Reconnaissance Bureau and the Defense Security Command from 1996. Han was arrested after infiltrating the coast of Gochang County, North Jeolla Province in 1969 as a member of an armed spy ring, but was later re-recruited by the North Korean Reconnaissance Bureau while attempting to reunite with his family in North Korea.
