= Park Myung-sik =

Executed North Korean serial killer

- Born: 1951; Sinpo, North Korea
- Died: October 1991 (aged 39–40); Sinpo, North Korea
- Cause of death: Execution by firing squad
- Other name: The Organ Harvester
- Conviction: Murder (12 counts)
- Penalty: Death

Details
- Victims: 12
- Span of crimes: April – October 1990
- Country: North Korea
- State: South Hamgyong
- Date apprehended: October 15, 1990
- Imprisoned at: October 15, 1990 – May 1991

Park Myung-sik (Korean: 박명식; 1951 – October 1991), nicknamed The Organ Harvester, was a purported North Korean serial killer who was convicted of killing twelve teenagers in the port city of Sinpo from April to October 1990, in order to eat their livers to cure his cirrhosis. He was sentenced to death and executed in 1991.

== Background ==
Due to the heavy censorship in North Korea, nothing concrete is known about Park's background, and confirmation of the story's veracity is hard to achieve. At the time of his crimes, he worked as a factory worker in Sinpo, where he was described as timid by his colleagues.

For some years prior to the murders, Park had been suffering from cirrhosis, for which he had to be treated by a famous doctor at a large hospital in Hamhung. The treatment apparently had no effect, and while continuing to suffer from pains, Park overheard a co-worker say that a fortune teller could help him with his issues. As religious practises are forbidden in the country, the co-worker agreed to introduce him in secret, and when he met the fortune teller, Park begged him for answers to cure his illness.

While he initially rejected his pleas, the fortune teller eventually felt pity for him and told Park that the only way to cure his illness was to consume human livers. Frightened by the prospect of killing a human, he returned home, but as his condition grew worse and worse over time, Park supposedly decided that it would be better to try than to die in agony.

== Murders ==
Park's modus operandi was to scour communal farms in rural villages, searching for students aged 14 to 17 who were dispatched to work there. On one occasion, he broke into a dormitory and latched himself onto a sleeping 15-year-old, putting his hand over her mouth and then stabbing her with a knife. As he was carrying the bleeding girl out of the building, Park was frightened off by barking dogs and was forced to flee, leaving the student behind. She died of her injuries the following day.

A few days later, a farmer at a nearby farm found the severely mutilated body of another student, whose injuries were so severe that he fainted. The Sinpo City Police Department was alerted to the discovery, but despite investigations, they were unable to identify or catch the criminal; instead, some suggested that it might be the work of a ghost. A few days after this incident, the body of a woman in her 20s was found in downtown Sinpo, bearing the same injuries as the previous victim.

Due to police incompetence and a lack of the necessary investigative technology, the perpetrator continued to kill in Sinpo and its surroundings, claiming an additional nine victims. The killings caused panic among residents, who refused to go out at night.

== Arrest, trial, and execution ==
One day in October 1990, Park attempted to abduct his thirteenth victim, a student travelling for work at the communal farm. He was unsuccessful and fled, but on the way, he was noticed by vigilant citizens who immediately apprehended him and brought him to the police station. Following his confessions, the fortune teller was also arrested and charged with an unknown offence.

Park's trial was held in mid-October 1991 before the People's Court in Sinpo. He pleaded guilty to the charges, and was convicted and sentenced to death. Sometime that same month, he was executed by firing squad. As punishment for giving the advice that led Park to start his murder spree, the fortune teller was sentenced to 15 years in a penal colony, which he served out in full and was released in 2006. As per the North Korean criminal code, he was then deported to another province, and his further fate remains unknown.

== Aftermath ==
In 2006, the case of Park Myung-sik was reported in Daily NK, a South Korean online newspaper that primarily relays information about current affairs in North Korea. The article criticized the North Korean government and its Juche ideology, explicitly focusing on North Korean censorship and denial of religious freedom.

== See also ==
- List of incidents of cannibalism
- List of serial killers by country
