= Database Center for North Korean Human Rights =

Seoul-based North Korean human rights organization

- Founded: May 2003; 23 years ago South Korea
- Type: Nonprofit; NGO
- Headquarters: 4th Floor, 393, Samil-daero, Jongno-gu, Seoul, Junggu, Seoul; South Korea
- Fields: Recording human rights violations in North Korea, human rights advancement in North Korea, transitional justice, transitional justice, North Korean defectors settlement support
- Executive Director: Hanna Song
- Website: en.nkdb.org

The Database Center for North Korean Human Rights (commonly referred to as NKDB) (Korean: 북한인권정부센터) is a nonprofit, non-governmental organization, headquartered in Seoul, South Korea, that conducts data collection, analysis, and monitoring of human rights violations experienced in the Democratic People’s Republic of Korea (DPRK, or North Korea). NKDB not only offers resettlement support, psychological counseling, and educational opportunities, but also advocates for human rights advancement and transitional justice of past human rights violations in the DPRK.

NKDB’s Unified Human Rights Database contains over 84,000 cases of human rights infractions and details of over 54,000 involved persons. Along with regularly releasing books and reports, the organization hosts as well as participates in seminars that analyze and contextualize such incidents of human rights violation.

== History ==
=== 2000s ===
NKDB was officially established on 12 May 2003 in an effort to highlight the human rights situation inside North Korea. The organization was recognized as a legal entity by the South Korean Ministry of Unification in 2004. Furthermore, the organization expanded through the establishment of NK Social Research and the Resettlement Assistance Headquarters, and through research on different facets of North Korean defectors such as separated families, South Korean abductees, young female defectors, and those suffering from post-traumatic stress disorder.

=== 2010s ===
NKDB placed a greater focus on bringing greater international awareness of the North Korean human rights situation to the international community in the 2010s. NKDB also enhanced its role in the education of relevant North Korean issues, beginning with the North Korean Human Rights Academy in 2011. These regular sessions are led by leading academics, civil servants, and human rights advocates. There are now five different academies, focusing on issues ranging from human rights in North Korea, reunification of the Korean peninsula through a diplomatic approach, and counselling support for North Korean defectors.

=== 2020s ===
In 2020, NKDB entered into an agreement to jointly operate the Hana Center in the western region of Gyeonggi Province, in conjunction with the Korea Hana Foundation, a public organization founded by the Ministry of Unification. The purpose of the Hana Centers is to provide continued assistance to North Korean defectors after their initial education at the government-run Settlement Support Center for North Korean Refugees, known as Hanawon. Concurrently, NKDB re-launched the Visual Atlas, a web-based platform to publicize the data recorded in the NKDB Unified Human Rights Database that enables visualization of incidents of North Korean human rights violations through an interactive map. In 2020, NKDB launched the North Korean Human Rights Larchiveum, a web-based platform that aggregates available information on North Korean human rights through a consortium of civil society organizations working on the issue. In early 2022, NKDB launched the NKDB Center for Human Rights Legal Support in order to provide direct relief to victims of North Korean human rights violations through legal pursuits. Concurrently, NKDB launched the North Korea SDG Data Portal to share the progress that North Korea has made in achieving the Sustainable Development Goals and their connection to the human rights situation inside the country.

In April 2020, the South Korean Ministry of Unification refused to renew an annual contract which gave NKDB access into Hanawon. NKDB conducted research of North Korean Defectors since 2003, with interviews from the Hanawon serving as the core of its annual White Paper. There are now no independent civil society organizations that are permitted to enter Hanawon.

=== Work Related to the UN ===
NKDB has also been involved in UN developments as it relates to North Korea. Included are monitoring reports drafted by NKDB that were submitted to the land UN Commission of Inquiry on North Korean Human Rights in 2014, reports on North Korea’s implementation of Universal Periodic Reviews issued by the UN through the North Korea Implementation of UN Recommendations Watch Group, and publications on North Korea’s status of implementation of the UN Sustainable Development Goals. Since 2015, NKDB has received grants from the United Nations Voluntary Fund for Victims of Torture (UNVFVT), which supports the organization’s counselling programs for North Korean defectors that have experienced torture prior to arrival in South Korea. NKDB is one of two organizations in South Korea to receive support from the UNVFVT.

== Profile/ Affiliated Organizations ==
=== North Korean Human Rights Archives ===
With records of over 84,000 cases of human rights infractions and over 54,000 individuals involved in these cases, the North Korean Human Rights Archives’ NKDB Unified Human Rights Database is the largest of its kind in the world. With human rights violations not being systematically documented within North Korea, a function of the Archives is to serve as evidence for any future opportunities of transitional justice. Publications based on the Archives contribute to the list of fact-finding reports on human rights in North Korea.

=== The North Korean Human Rights Watch Functions ===
There are 8 working groups within the North Korean Human Rights Watch Functions, based on areas recognized by NKDB as needing further research and policy recommendations.

1. North Korea Implementation of UN Recommendations Watch Group
2. North Korean Religious (Persecution) Watch Group
3. North Korea Detention Facility Watch Group
4. Human Rights of Members of the North Korean Armed Forces Watch Group
5. Overseas North Korean Human Rights Watch Group
6. North Korea Death Penalty Watch Group
7. North Korea Drugs Watch Group
8. North Korea Nuclear/Biological/Chemical Weapons (ABC) and North Korean Human Rights Watch Group

=== Resettlement Assistance Headquarters (Counseling Team) ===
The Resettlement Assistance Headquarters provides adjustment education, psychological counselling, monetary support, and advocacy support for former prisoners of war, those abducted to North Korea, victims of human rights violations or torture in North Korea, human trafficking, and those who lost or were never granted governmental monetary support.

=== Education Center for Korean Integration ===
The Education Center for Korean Integration provides educational opportunities in an effort to increase civil society’s awareness of issues surrounding North Korea and human rights conditions there. These opportunities include academies - a series of lectures by distinguished guests - and forums to encourage discourses within the broader society.

Current list of academies (offered in the Fall and Spring):

- North Korean Human Rights Academy
- Unification Diplomacy Academy
- Together for Unification Academy
- Psychological Counseling for North Korean Defectors Academy
- Unification Social Welfare Academy
- Unification Law Academy
- Inter-Korean Integration Academy
- NKDB also conducts an ongoing Together for Unification Forum for those who have completed at least one of NKDB's academies. Participants in the Forum meet once a month to discuss inter-Korean issues more deeply, followed by debate on how best to approach the issues in the future.

Current list of seasonal courses (offered in Summer and Winter):

- North Korean Education
- Religion in North Korea
- Psychological Understanding

NKDB also conducts the Dream Plus Forum for youth to learn about inter-Korean issues. The Dream Plus Forum is held once per year.

=== NK Social Research Center ===
An affiliated organization of NKDB, the NK Social Research Center conducts research and surveys on the testimonies of North Korean defectors, as well as the defectors’ resettlement process in South Korea and macro-level trends in North Korea. The organization also provides consulting services on North Korean issues.

== Notable Individuals ==
- Yeosang Yoon, Adjunct Professor of Kookmin University Graduate School of Legal Affairs; former Visiting Scholar at the Paul H. Nitze School of Advanced International Studies of Johns Hopkins University; current Chief Director
- Young Ho Shin, former Dean of Korea University School of Law; current chairman of the Board
- Jaiho Chung, Former Defense Attache at the South Korean Defense Intelligence Agency in Germany, current head of NKDB's Resettlement Assistance Headquarters
- Sang Hun Kim, former Educational Advisor at the Embassy of the United Kingdom in Seoul; former UN World Food Programme Representative for Guyana; former Director of the South Korean branch of Amnesty International; first chairman of the Board
- Jai Chun Lee, former South Korean ambassador to Russia, the EU, and Bangladesh; third chairman of the Board
- Jong Hun Park, Professor at the Department of Orthopedic Surgery at Korea University; Co-Representative of the Medical Association for North Korean Human Rights; second chairman of the Board
- Woong Ki Kim, board member of Saejowi (Organization for One Korea); member of Human Rights Commission of Seoul Bar Association; former member of Deliberating Committee on Compensation and Support for South Korean abductees (under the Office of the Prime Minister); former Chief Director and current Member of the Board

== Select English Publications ==
- Kim, Insung, Hyun-min Ah, Hanna Song, Seungju Lee. Prisoners in Military Uniform: Human Rights in the North Korean Military. Seoul: Database Center for North Korean Human Rights, 2022.
- An, Hyun-min, Gayoung Kim, Min-ju Kim, Seonhyeong Kim, Seongnam Kim, Sowon Kim, Seunghye Kim, Bo Bae Su, Hanna Song, Hyo-sun Shin, Hayoung Ahn, Yeo-sang Yoon, Soon-hee Lim, Seonyeong Choi, and Teodora Gyupchanova. White Paper on North Korean Human Rights 2020. Seoul: NKDB North Korean Human Rights Archives, 2021.
- An, Hyun-min, Yeo-sang Yoon, and Jaiho Chung. White Paper on Religious Freedom in North Korea 2018. Seoul: Database Center for North Korean Human Rights, 2019.
- Lim, Soon-hee, and Seokchang Kim. 2018 Social and Economic Integration of North Korean Defectors in South Korea. Seoul: Database Center for North Korean Human Rights, 2019.
- Song, Hanna. A Second Chance: North Korea’s Implementations of its Recommendations During its Second Universal Periodic Review. Seoul: Database Center for North Korean Human Rights, 2019.
- Choi, Sun-young, Jina Yang, Hanna Song, and Na-kyeong Lee. The UN Universal Periodic Review and the DPRK: Monitoring of North Korea’s Implementation of Its Recommendations. Seoul: Database Center for North Korean Human Rights, 2017.
- Park, Chan Hong. Conditions of Labor and Human Rights: North Korean Overseas Laborers in Russia. Seoul: Database Center for North Korean Human Rights, 2016.
- North Korean Human Rights Case Report: Victims’ Voices. 2 vols. Seoul: Database Center for North Korean Human Rights, 2013.
