= People for Successful Corean Reunification =

South Korean non-profit

People for Successful Corean Reunification (PSCORE)
- Founded: 2006
- Type: NGO
- Headquarters: Seoul, South Korea
- Key people: Kim Tae-hun, President Kim Young-Il, Founder, Director (Seoul) Nam Bada, Secretary General
- Website: pscore.org/home (English)

People for Successful Corean Reunification (PSCORE) is a non-governmental organization based in Seoul, South Korea, and Washington D.C. in the United States. PSCORE addresses potential barriers to Korea reunification, suggests alternatives, and works to improve the situation of North Korean defectors in South Korea and China to bridge the gap between South Korea, North Korea, and the international community. The organization is made up of North and South Korean staff, interns and volunteers from South Korea and abroad, and North Korean defectors. While PSCORE provides news coverage on North Korea and helps defectors become South Korean citizens, a unique aspect is that educational programs are offered for North Korean defectors.

== History ==
In October 2006, PSCORE was established by young North Korean defectors, South Korean university students, and foreigners in Korea interested in improving human rights in North Korea and the reunification of the Korean Peninsula. The organization uses ‘C’ in the acronym ‘PSCORE’ to represent the pre-20th-century spelling "Corea", when the two countries were one.

== Objectives ==
The organization encourages harmony and understanding between the two Koreas through educational programs, awareness campaigns, and discussion panels. To address the possible obstacles to reunification of North and South Korea, the organization suggests solutions to resolve such obstacles by creating space for discussing issues related to reunification, human rights, and North Korean democratization. It also seeks to fill gaps in the existent assimilation aid for North Korean defectors. The organization is composed of those who share a common interest and passion for Korean reunification, human rights in North Korea, and to see North Korean defectors become self-supporting.

== PSCORE's Work ==
=== Human Rights Data Collection and Analysis ===
Detailed evidence of human rights abuses in North Korea is collected through interviews with North Korean defectors living in South Korea. The data is used for written and visual depictions of the human rights crisis in North Korea to be accessible for the public. Here is a list of PSCORE's publications:

Title	Year of publication	Content
Digital rights in North Korea. The new frontier of human rights	2021	The report focuses on digital rights abuses by the North Korean government. With the development of new technologies, the North Korean government has tightened control on all aspects of life. North Koreans are now under constant extensive control of the government when using the Internet and individual digital devices, which is unimaginable for most people as in this new digital world the Internet has become a part of people’s daily lives.
Guide to Communication for Social Integration Between North and South Koreans	2019	The report is focusing on the ways South Koreans can communicate with the rising numbers of North Korean refugees that seek asylum in the country. As the chances of meeting a North Korean are high it becomes crucial to learn and be capable of communicating with them with no problems.
Inescapable violence. Child abuse within the North Korea	2019	This report deeply focuses on the omnipresent forms of abuse (physical, sexual, psychological) and neglect perpetrated on children in North Korea and how it affects their future.
Social Integration between North and South Koreans	2019	The report is shedding a light on how North and South Koreans view one another and the efforts and hardships encountered by both to reach an understanding of each other. The booklet is hoped to become a small step towards making the world a happier place with North and South Koreans together.
Cases of sexual violence against North Korean Woman and ways to improve	2019	The paper is a collection of testimonies by North Korean women and North Korean scholars. Report intended to uncover problems of sexual violence and how it has risen in importance as a social issue.
Forgotten abductees: 50 years in North Korea	2019	Report that intends to shed light on the abduction of South Koreans and foreign nationals by the DPRK, focusing on the case of the hijacked airplane KAL YS-11 in 1969.
Violation of children's rights in North Korea	2018	Report about North Korea's education system, child labor and child abuse.
Forced to hate	2018	Report that broaches North Korea's education system, how it violates human rights and how to approach changes.
Unending oil: child labor within North Korea	2017	Report that focuses on the different types of arduous labor children must face within and outside the education system.
The faceless ones	2016	Compilation of testimonies covering a wide range of the daily life in North Korea such as school, prison camps through collective farms and military services.
PSCORE 1Oth anniversary white paper	2016	Paper is a review of Pscore's ten-year journey since its founding by Mr. Kim Young II in 2006.
Transnational abuse & exploitation	2016	Report about the violation of human rights for workers who leave North Korea to work abroad.
Human rights violations in North Korea	2013	Report that covers human rights abuses committed by the North Korean authorities in the territory of the Democratic People Republic of Korea over the course of the last decade.
Only the freedom to breathe	2013	Book that discusses the human rights violations that occur in North Korea, a nation widely known for its nuclear tests, hereditary dictatorship, and communism. It features testimonies which were obtained through direct interviews from North Korean defectors of the human rights abuses they saw and experienced before escaping to South Korea. Each case is recorded onto a Google Maps page which displays the time, location, violation type, violation organ, account of incident and offender and victim information.
North Korea	2013	Report about North Korea's customs and human rights violations concerning; education, food, labour, economy, media, culture, people politics as well as crime and punishment.

=== UN ECOSOC Consultative Status ===
In 2012, PSCORE received United Nations Economic and Social Council Consultative status. Consultative status enables an NGO to submit written statements to the United Nations Human Rights Council, speak at the sessions, attend UNHRC meetings and hold parallel events in the boundaries of the UN during UNHRC sessions. PSCORE partakes in the Universal Periodic Review (UPR) organized by the Human Rights Council and cooperate with the Special Rapporteur and the Commission of Inquiry for Human Rights in North Korea. Furthermore, they participate at the Third Committee of the General Assembly, the Social Humanitarian and Cultural Committee as well.

=== International conferences and seminars ===
In Seoul there has been an International Youth Conference on North Korean Human Rights, and another human rights conference every April during North Korea Freedom Week. The conferences and seminars hosted by PSCORE aim to raise awareness and educate people on topics related to reunification of the Korean Peninsula and human rights in North Korea.

=== Educational Programs ===
In Seoul, PSCORE supports North Korean defectors through education as a response to the North Korean situation where English is not taught or encouraged. Through one-on-one English tutoring and weekly English classes, North Korean defectors have resources and support to learn English for the educational standard in South Korea is increasingly adopting English as a requirement. Volunteers tutor also in essay writing, science, and math. Some North Korean defectors, when enrolled in college, are surprised at the amount of English required in their studies. Seventy-percent of PSCORE students seek help mostly in English as it is increasingly being used in South Koreans’ daily lives and workplaces. PSCORE also organizes monthly excursions for South Koreans, North Korean defectors and foreigners to meet and participate in cultural activities together.

=== Helping Refugees in China ===
PSCORE provides basic necessities for North Korean women defectors in China such as food, medical supplies, and warm winter clothes. Orphaned children escaping from North Korea live in constant fear of being sent back. Without any legal rights, they cannot receive citizenship and cannot receive medical attention or education. PSCORE supports such children to acquire legal status to attend school and the basic necessities of housing, clothing, and financial support. There are also safety houses run by PSCORE to protect escapees from the PRC government. These houses have food, water, and electricity and are protected locations monitored by PSCORE staff.

=== Online Campaigns ===
Through online campaigning, PSCORE has held contests for university students to creatively address the issue of democratization in North Korea. South Korean students have submitted original videos and essays reflecting their views of North Korea.

=== Street Campaigns ===
In 2013, PSCORE began campaigns around Seoul to educate the public on the human rights abuses occurring within North Korea. The campaigns usually feature 20 different information boards which outline different issues. PSCORE volunteers also talk with interested people in order to give them a greater understanding of the current situation. So far campaigns have taken place at Gimpo International Airport, Dongdaemun History and Culture Park Station, Yongsan Station, Itaewon Station, Hongik University and Seoul National University of Education.

== Past actions ==
=== Fundraising Concerts ===
Every 2–3 months from 2011 to 2015, PSCORE was hosting fundraising rock concerts entitled 'Rock out for a Good Cause' at Club Freebird in the Hongdae area of Seoul. The concerts featured both Korean and expat bands and have been very successful in helping PSCORE gain local recognition for its work, raise funds for various PSCORE programs and giving local talent a stage to play in front of up to 160 people.

=== PSCORE & Model UNSF 2022 ===
The Model United Nations Strategic framework Conference 2022 (Model UNSF) is organised by human rights advocacy group People for Successful COrean REunification. Model UNSF ultimately targets those who are currently enrolled in Universities, international organisations, institutions or companies to discuss issues surrounding North Korea in reference to the Sustainable Development Goals
