= Korean Bar Association =

South Korean bar association

- Formation: July 28, 1952
- Type: Unified bar
- Headquarters: 3F, 20, Seocho-daero 45-gil,, Seocho-gu, Seoul
- Location: South Korea
- President: YOUNG HOON KIM. (since February, 2023)
- Website: koreanbar.or.kr

The Korean Bar Association (KBA) is an organization established in 1952. It has criticized country policies if it feels wrong and contributed to the establishment of fundamental democratic order and the accomplishment of social justice through formation of public opinions and provision of opinions.

Furthermore, in order to ensure firm establishment of the correct legal system and consistent enforcement thereof, the KBA is active in presenting its opinions regarding development of policies, and legislation, amendment and abolition of laws. In an attempt to contribute to the creation of the legal culture that lays the foundation for a democratic society and the realization of the rule of law principle, the KBA holds an annual event called “Lawyers Conference for Rule of Law” around the KBA foundation day (July 28), and presents “Korean Legal Culture Award” to those who have displayed remarkable achievement in the development of legal culture.

The KBA conducts strict review with respect to registration and declaration of lawyers and refusal or cancellation of lawyer registration. At the same time, the KBA provides training regarding legal theories and practical training for its individual members to response to specialized and varied legal demand and enhance the required quality for job performance.

To properly handle international legal affairs in the face of the increasing economic and cultural exchanges in the international arena, the KBA has organized a variety of committees that are conducting survey and research activities to refine the legal system and strengthen the competitiveness of lawyers, and is involved in dynamic exchanges with foreign legal organizations in the form of dispatching its members overseas and inviting foreign guests.
