= North Korea Strategy Center =

South Korean non-profit

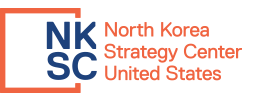
- Founded: 2007
- Founder: Kang Chol-Hwan
- Purpose: Media dissemination, defector empowerment, education
- Headquarters: Seoul, South Korea
- Region served: North Korea
- Website: nksc.us

North Korean Strategy Center (NKSC) is a defector-led NGO that was established in Seoul, South Korea in 2007 to raise awareness on North Korea's human rights conditions, and advocate of freedom and unification in Korea. Understanding the power of media and information to open minds and bring change, NKSC seeks to bring free press and media into North Korea by working with North and South Koreans, as well as the international community, raising awareness, with emphasis on the need for freedom of information and expression in North Korea. Since its inception, NKSC has worked with over 150 North Korean defectors, and sent over 40,000 DVDs, 400 radio sets, and 4,000 USBs into North Korea.

== Organization ==
The North Korea Strategy Center was established in the summer of 2007 by North Korean defector, and former Yodok Prison Camp inmate, Kang Chol-Hwan. It is a non-partisan think-tank that undertakes research and promotes action on North Korean issues based on principles of freedom of expression and freedom of information. It envisions a free, open and unified Korea that upholds the fundamental human rights of all its people in a healthy democracy.

NKSC has carried out extensive research on the effects and impacts of external media on the North Korean people, and has carried out many seminars on information dissemination and control in North Korea. NKSC works closely with the defector community, providing various training programs and workshops. The organization also trains young North Korean defector journalists and facilitates connections between defectors and media outlets.

In 2015, NKSC US was established in New York as the first international office of the organization.

== Research and Seminars ==
NKSC specializes in research on North Korea issues carried out amongst the defector community collaborating with experts and international organizations. It operates with a firm commitment to a deeper understanding of the particular conditions in North Korea, especially those impacting human rights, that is necessary for dispelling misconceptions and stereotypes while informing sound decision-making towards North Korea.

Previous NKSC research projects and seminars include:

'Illicit Drugs and Human Rights' (to be published in 2016) – a report investigating the human rights impacts of illicit drug production, distribution and use in North Korea.

‘Examining North Korean Government’s Response to the Inflow of External Information Based on Documents from The Korean People’s Internal Affairs’ – an analysis of North Korean criminal law and Kim Jong Un's orders and countermeasures against state-defined crime.

‘North Korea – Media and IT Infrastructure’ – a survey of the ICT landscape in North Korea, assessing North Koreans' use of cell phones, computers, external storage devices and other ICT devices to communicate with each other under the current information controls imposed by the government. 2014.

‘An Interpretation of Jang Song Taek’s Execution and Human Rights Abuses in North Korea from a Legalistic Human Rights Perspective’ - a seminar by Professor Hong Song Pil, 2014.

‘History of Purges in North Korea and Prospects for the Kim Jong Un Regime’ – a seminar following Jang Song Taek's purge and execution by Dr. Kwak In-Su, NKSC Seoul Board member, 2014.

‘The Conditions of North Korean Overseas Labor’ – an investigation into the use and abuse of North Korean laborers dispatched for overseas work assignments, working under exploitative conditions.

United Nations Human Rights Council Universal Period Review (UPR) Joint Submission by NKSC and Free the North Korean Gulag (FNKG).
