= Korea Institute for National Unification =

South Korean think tank

Korea Institute for National Unification (KINU)
- 통일연구원
- Predecessor: Research Institute for National Unification
- Formation: 1990 (founded under the Ministry of Unification); since 2005, under the auspices of NRC (National Research Council of Economics, Humanities and Social Sciences)
- Type: Think tank
- Headquarters: 217, Banpo-daero, Seocho-gu, (Banpo-dong)
- Location: Seoul, South Korea
- President of the Institute: Kim Chun-sik
- Website: www.kinu.or.kr/main/eng

The Korea Institute for National Unification is a think tank funded by the South Korean government focusing on issues related to Korean reunification.

It is one of the 25 institutes under the auspices of the National Research Council for Economic, Human and Social Sciences (NRC); it is an organization to depend of "Public Institutions under the Prime Minister" (affiliated with the Office for the Coordination of State Affairs)

Since July 2023, Kim Chun-sik is the head of the Korean Institute for National Unification.

== History ==
In 1990, the institute was established as a hub of research on North Korea.

It was established as a state-funded research institute under the authority of the Prime Minister with the aim of systematically researching and analyzing all issues related to peace and reunification in the Korean Peninsula and contributing to the reunification of the countries and the establishment of the northern Korean.

In 2010, the institute carried out an interview with 33 defectors from North Korea and found out that the spread of Hallyu, or the Korean Wave, was one of the main factors encouraging some North Koreans to risk their lives to escape to South Korea.

== Publications ==
=== White Paper on Human Rights in North Korea ===
The Korea Institute for National Unification (KINU) opened the Center for North Korean Human Rights, in December 1994, to collect and manage professionally and systematically all source materials and objective data concerning North Korean human rights; and from 1996, KINU has been publishing every year the ‘White Paper on Human Rights in North Korea’ in Korean and in English.

- White Paper on Human Rights in North Korea 2014
- White Paper on Human Rights in North Korea 2013
- White Paper on Human Rights in North Korea 2012

=== Reports and analyses ===
- Law and Policy on Korean Unification: Analysis and Implications
- Improving Human Rights in North Korea
- 2nd KINU-ASPI 1.5 Track Streategic Dialogue
- The Road to a ‘Happy Unification’
- The Trust-building Process and Korean unification

=== International Journal of Korean Unification Studies ===
- vol. 24, no. 1
- 23, no. 2
- vol. 23, no. 1
