= List of North Korean terrorist attacks =

After the Korean War, North Korea had bad relations with South Korea, threatening them or attacking them for the protection of theirs (state terrorism). The government of North Korea banned everything in relation to South Korea or the United States.

== List ==
Attack Title	Date:	Deaths:	Survivors:	Suspect(s)
Korean Air Lines YS-11 hijacking	11 December 1969	0	51	North Korean agent Cho Ch'ang-hŭi (조창희).
Rangoon Bombing	9 October 1983	21	46	Kang Min Chul, 2 others
Gimpo International Airport bombing	14 September 1986	5	30–36	North Korea
Korean Air flight 858	29 November 1987	115	0	Kim Il Sung, Kim Hyon Hui
Assassination of Kim Jong Nam	13 February 2017	1	0	Siti Aisyah, Đoàn Thị Hương (rumored to be sent there by Kim Jong Un)
