= Mayumi (name) =

- Pronunciation: Mayumi
- Gender: Female

Origin
- Origin: Japanese
- Meaning: different meanings depending on the kanji used
- Region of origin: Japanese

Other names
- Related names: Yumi

Mayumi (まゆみ, マユミ) is a common Japanese given name for females.

== Written forms ==
Mayumi can be written using different kanji characters and can mean:

- 檀, "spindle tree"
- 麻弓, "linen, bow"
- 真弓 or 眞弓, "truth, bow" or "spindle tree"
- 雅弓, "elegant, bow"
- 真由美 or 眞由美, "truth, reason, beauty"
- 麻由美, "linen, reason, beauty"
- 真有美, "truth, exist, beauty"
- 真優美, "truth, gentle, beauty"

The name can also be written in hiragana as まゆみ or katakana as マユミ.

== People ==
=== Given name ===
- Mayumi Aoki (青木 まゆみ; born 1953), Japanese swimmer
- Mayumi Asaka (朝加 真由美; born 1955), Japanese actress
- Mayumi Asano (浅野 まゆみ; born 1969), Japanese voice actress
- Mayumi Asano (archer) (浅野 真弓; born 1976), Japanese archer
- Mayumi Azuma (東 まゆみ; born 1975), Japanese manga artist
- Mayumi Gojo (五條 真由美; born 1972), Japanese singer
- Mayumi Hachiya (真由美), Kim Hyon-hui's Japanese cover name
- Mayumi Heene, see Balloon boy hoax
- Mayumi Hirase (平瀬 真由美; born 1969), Japanese professional golfer
- Mayumi Horikawa (堀川 まゆみ; born 1958), Japanese model and singer-songwriter
- Mayumi Ichikawa (市河 麻由美; born 1976), Japanese long-distance runner
- Mayumi Iizuka (飯塚 雅弓; born 1977), Japanese voice actress and J-pop singer
- Mayumi Inaba (稲葉 真弓; 1950–2014), Japanese writer and poet
- Mayumi Inoue (井上 真由美; born 1970), Japanese softball player
- Mayumi Itsuwa (五輪 真弓; born 1951), Japanese vocalist, composer, lyricist, and keyboardist
- Mayumi Kaji (加治 真弓; born 1964), Japanese football player
- Mayumi Kameda (亀田 真弓; born 1957), Japanese pianist
- Mayumi Kawasaki (川崎 真裕美; born 1980), Japanese race walker
- Mayumi Kawasaki (basketball) (川﨑 真由美; born 1972), Japanese basketball player
- Mayumi Kimura (木村 昌由美), Japanese biologist and the administrative director
- Mayumi Kojima (小島 麻由美; born 1972), Japanese Shibuya-kei musician
- Mayumi Miyata (宮田 まゆみ; born 1954), Japanese player of the shō
- Mayumi Morinaga (森永 真由美; born 1981), Japanese singer
- Mayumi Moriyama (森山 眞弓; 1927–2021), Japanese politician
- Mayumi Muroyama (室山 まゆみ), the pen name of Japanese manga artists Mayumi Muroyama and Mariko Muroyama
- Mayumi Nagisa (渚 まゆみ; born 1944), Japanese actress and singer
- Mayumi Narita (成田 真由美; 1970–2025), Japanese swimmer
- Mayumi Ogawa (小川 眞由美; born 1939), Japanese actress
- Mayumi Ohkutsu (大久津 真由美; born 1968), Japanese curler
- Mayumi Oiwa (大岩 真由美; born 1972), Japanese football referee
- Mayumi Omatsu (大松 真由美; born 1970), Japanese football player
- Mayumi Ono (actress) (小野 真弓; born 1981), Japanese actress, entertainer, gravure idol, and singer
- Mayumi Ono (field hockey) (小野 真由美; born 1984), Japanese former field hockey player
- Mayumi Ouchi (大内 麻由美; born 1979), Japanese professional darts player
- Mayumi Ozaki (尾崎 魔弓; born 1968), Japanese professional wrestler
- Mayumi Pejo, US Olympian in taekwondo from Binghamton NY
- Mayumi Raheem (born 1991), Sri Lankan swimmer
- Mayumi Roller (born 1991) actress from the United States Virgin Islands
- Mayumi Sada (佐田 真由美; born 1977), Japanese model and actress
- Mayumi Sako (佐古 真弓; born 1978), Japanese actress and voice actress
- Mayumi Seiler (born 1963) Canadian-Austrian violinist
- Mayumi Shintani (新谷 真弓; born 1975), Japanese actress and voice actress
- Mayumi Shiraishi (白石 まゆみ; born 2000), Japanese idol of idol group Sweet Steady
- Mayumi Shō (荘 真由美; born 1965), Japanese voice actress
- Mayumi Someya (染谷 真有美; born 1993), Japanese karateka
- Mayumi Suzuki (すずき まゆみ; born 1970), Japanese voice actress
- Mayumi Suzuki (すずき真弓), Japanese manga artist, illustrator of Wandering Sun
- Mayumi Tanaka (田中 真弓; born 1955), Japanese actress, voice actress and narrator
- Mayumi Wakamura (若村 麻由美; born 1967), Japanese actress
- Mayumi Watanabe (渡辺 真弓; born 1983), Japanese sprinter
- Mayumi Yamaguchi (山口 眞弓; born 1975), Japanese voice actress
- Mayumi Yamamoto (actress) (山本 真由美; born 1984), Japanese actress
- Mayumi Yamamoto (singer) (山本 真裕美; 1958–2001), Japanese singer, lyricist, and composer
- Mayumi Yamamoto (speed skater) (山本 真弓; born 1971), Japanese speed skater
- Mayumi Yamashita (山下 まゆみ; born 1975), Japanese judoka
- Mayumi Yoshida (吉田 真弓; born 1982), Japanese voice actress

=== Surname ===
- Akinobu Mayumi (真弓 明信; born 1953), Japanese former manager for the Hanshin Tigers baseball team

== Fictional characters ==
- Mayumi (マユミ), a character in the Psychiatrist Irabu series of short stories
- Mayumi, a character in the film Urduja
- Mayumi Kino (真弓), a character in the manga and OVA Blue Submarine No. 6
- Mayumi Kisumi (まゆみ), a character in the anime Smile PreCure!
- Mayumi Kubota (真弓), a character in the Nickelodeon/Netflix series Glitch Techs
- Mayumi Kinniku (真弓), a male character in the comic Kinnikuman and its sequel Ultimate Muscle
- Mayumi Tendo (真弓), a character in the novel, comic and film Battle Royale
- Mayumi Thyme (真弓), a character in the visual novel SHUFFLE!
- Mayumi Saegusa (真由美), a character in the light novel series The Irregular at Magic High School
- Mayumi Joutouguu (磨弓), a character in Wily Beast and Weakest Creature from the video game series Touhou Project
- Mayumi Nishikino (麻弓), a character in the manga and anime series The Kawai Complex Guide to Manors and Hostel Behavior

== See also ==
- Mayumi (disambiguation)
