= Sora Jung =

South Korean actress (born 1968)

- Born: 29 January 1968 (age 58); Seoul, South Korea
- Agent: Family Actors Entertainment
- Height: 166 cm (5 ft 5 1/2 in)

Korean name
- Hangul: 김영림
- Hanja: 金榮林
- RR: Gim Yeongrim
- MR: Kim Yŏngnim

Stage name
- Hangul: 김서라
- Hanja: 金曙曪
- RR: Gim Seora
- MR: Kim Sŏra

Sora Jung (born as Kim Seo-ra on 29 January 1968) is a South Korean television actress. Her first appearance was the role of Kim Hyon-hui in the film Mayumi directed by Shin Sang-ok based on the bombing of Korean Air Flight 858. She appeared in the sixth episode of the first season of Lost, entitled House of the Rising Sun, portraying an "interior decorator", which is actually a guise — instead, she helps Sun-Hwa Kwon flee the country. She has an MBA degree in acting/theater.

== Filmography ==
=== Television ===
- The Elegant Empire (KBS2, 2023–2024)
- How Are U Bread (TV Naver Cast, 2020)
- VIP (SBS, 2019)
- Different Dreams (MBC, 2019)
- Best Chicken (Dramax/MBN, 2019)
- Left-Handed Wife (KBS2, 2019)
- Partners for Justice (MBC, 2018)
- Switch (SBS, 2018)
- Unknown Woman (KBS2, 2017)
- My Father Is Strange (KBS, 2017)
- Whisper (SBS, 2017)
- Saimdang, Memoir of Colors (SBS, 2017)
- Another Miss Oh (tvN, 2016)
- Best Lover (Youku / Netflix, 2016)
- Secrets of Women (KBS2, 2016)
- Under the Black Moonlight (Sohu TV, SBS, 2016)
- Angry Mom (MBC, 2015)
- The Dearest Lady (MBC, 2015)
- Love on a Rooftop (KBS2, 2015)
- What Happens to My Family? (KBS2, 2014)
- Secret Love (DRAMAcube, 2014)
- A Cat! Meow (KBS1, 2014)
- Bride of the Century (TV Chosun, 2014)
- Angel's Revenge (KBS2, 2014)
- Ruby Ring (KBS2, 2013)
- Jang Ok-jung, Living by Love (SBS, 2013)
- The Innocent Man (KBS2, 2012)
- Big (KBS2, 2012)
- God of War (MBC, 2012)
- The Princess' Man (KBS2, 2011)
- The Scale of Providence (SBS, 2008)
- Lobbyist (SBS, 2007)
- Lost (ABC, 2004)
- Kuk-hee (MBC, 1999)
- Blushing with Love (MBC, 1998)
- Sibling Relations (MBC, 1996)
- General Hospital (MBC, 1994)

=== Film ===
- Missing You (2016)
- Happiness for Sale (2013)
- Late Autumn (2010)
- The Story of Two Women (1994)
- Mayumi: Virgin Terrorist (1990)
