= Lee Beom-seok =

Lee Beom-seok (sometimes transliterated in other ways such as Yi Pom-Sok) was the name of two important 20th century politicians in South Korea:

- Lee Beom-seok (prime minister) (1900–1972), Korean independence activist and later the first Prime Minister of South Korea from 1948 until 1950
- Lee Beom-seok (foreign minister) (1925–1983), Foreign Minister of South Korea from 1982 until his death in the Rangoon bombing in 1983
