= Shoot the Women First =

1991 non-fiction book

- Author: Eileen MacDonald
- Language: English
- Subject: Terrorism
- Publisher: Random House
- Publication date: 1991
- Publication place: United States
- Pages: 241
- ISBN: 0-679-41596-3
- OCLC: 25315480
- Dewey Decimal: 303.6/25/019 20
- LC Class: HV6431 .M332 1992

Shoot the Women First is a 1991 book by Eileen MacDonald, based on the author's encounters with female terrorists. Through a collection of interviews, MacDonald analyzes the subjects, their reasons, and their modus operandi. Named after advice supposedly given to the sharpshooters in Germany's GSG 9 anti-terrorist squad, Shoot the Women First is based on some of the world's most notorious female terrorists (Leila Khaled and Kim Hyon Hui). It sets out to destroy what the author sees as stereotypical myth and male fantasy surrounding such women, that they are either gun-toting lesbian feminists or misguided pawns.

== Background ==
Eileen MacDonald is a British journalist who was intrigued by the question of whether women terrorists are more ruthless than their male counterparts. According to MacDonald, members of a German counterterrorism unit were told to shoot female terrorists first. A senior government security official explains, "Women terrorists have much stronger characters, more power, and more energy than men. There are several examples where men who have been cornered have waited a moment before they fired, but the women shot at once." MacDonald interviewed a total of twenty women terrorists from predominantly leftist terrorist groups, including members of Germany's Red Army Faction, Irish Republican Army, Italy's Red Brigades, and the Popular Front for the Liberation of Palestine (PFLP). All of these terrorist groups can be categorized under the third or "New Left" wave of terrorism. This wave was stimulated by the Vietnam War, and many of these third wave groups saw themselves as vanguards for the Third World masses. When the Vietnam War ended in 1975, the Palestine Liberation Organization (PLO) replaced the Viet Cong as the heroic model. Groups purposefully went after targets with international significance, thrusting local conflicts on to the global stage.

== Summary ==
=== Introduction/Main Argument ===
MacDonald states in the introduction that she "had always been interested in how women succeeded in what were considered to be male-dominated environments." This question of whether or not women are more lethal than their male-counterparts forms the basis of her book's main argument. Her purpose is not to blame or exonerate any one particular group or action, but to point out that there are value judgments involved in such matters. As a result, she refrains from using the word "terrorist" throughout her book. She claims, "It is just too vague a word to be applied wholesale to such a broad diversity of people and causes."

=== Chapter 1: Among the Women of ETA ===
The first chapter includes interviews with Euskadi Ta Askatasuna (ETA) women. ETA is an armed Basque nationalist and separatist movement and "Europe's most venerable urban guerrilla movement". These women were involved in the struggle for a Basque homeland and speak of a special camaraderie born out of joint suffering. Many of these women recount stories of being tortured. MacDonald, however, finds it fascinating that these women who have chosen to participate in violence used the same terms of condemnation raised against them in describing women interrogators. One ETA woman states, "I cannot comprehend how they can live with themselves," in regards to women torturers.

=== Chapter 2: Kim Hyon-hui ===
The second chapter highlights a specific female terrorist, Kim Hyon-hui, rather than a movement. Kim was the only woman interviewed who considered herself a terrorist, since she was acting on the orders of North Korea and explains a lifetime of brainwashing. Kim boarded Korean Air Flight 858 with an older man who appeared to be her father. Above their seats in the overhead compartment, was a plastic bag that contained a radio bomb. The plane landed at Abu Dhabi and Kim and the older man left the plane. However, the bomb remained in the overhead compartment for the second leg of the journey to Bangkok. At 2:05 pm Korean time, the plane exploded and there were no survivors. MacDonald describes Kim as a unique case. She states, "There was not an ounce of rebel in her…She was not interested in feminism; she was not driven by a sense of injustice; nor did she want to overthrow the society in which she lived." MacDonald characterizes Kim as robot-like but also ambitious and emphasizes her beauty. Throughout the chapter, MacDonald wonders if Kim would have received the attention she did if she were not beautiful.

=== Chapter 3: The Women of the West Bank ===
Chapter three features women of the West Bank set against the backdrop of the First Intifada or popular uprising in 1987. Women of all ages operated a highly effective intelligence network and their traditional clothing hid a wide variety of weapons. Israeli soldiers were well aware of this, yet there was still some reluctance in the army ranks to manhandle women. Many Palestinian women that MacDonald interviewed described the effects of the Intifada on their children and referenced the Intifada in similar maternalistic terms. MacDonald states, "It was as if they had transferred their maternal feelings to the fight."

=== Chapter 4: Leila Khaled ===
The fourth chapter emphasizes a particular Palestinian woman, Leila Khaled. Leila is credited with being the first woman hijacker (Note: Khaled is only sometimes described as the first woman to hijack a plane. However, in 1966 Maria Cristina Verrier, an Argentine woman, participated in the hijack of Aerolíneas Argentinas Flight 648. Amina Dahbour, another PFLP member, had participated in the attack on El Al Flight 432 in February 1969, but this was not a hijack: the attackers did not board the plane, but instead attacked it from outside.) and achieved in a few hours what the lives of hundreds of Palestinian fighters failed to do since: "she grabbed the attention of the world's media and held it enthralled." Leila became a sex symbol for her violence and is known by the iconic image of her wearing a kuffiyah and holding an AK-47. Following the Dawson's Field hijackings, Britain capitulated to the PFLP's demands and Leila was released from prison. After her release from prison, Leila faded from the public’s view. MacDonald caught up with her in Yarmouk refugee camp in Damascus, Syria. Leila recounts the first moments of her political awareness when her family was exiled from Haifa during the 1948 Arab-Israeli War. She then discusses her involvement with the PFLP and her hunger to return to her homeland. Leila states, "My work as a freedom fighter has given me happiness; you identify yourself with the struggle. It is the difference between a freedom fighter and an ordinary person." In the end, MacDonald comes to the conclusion that Leila was not a cruel or heartless woman but "almost childlike in her single-mindedness."

=== Chapter 5: The Women of the Irish Republican Movement ===
Chapter five examines women of the Irish Republican Movement. The conflict in Northern Ireland has been going on for hundreds of years, and women have always been involved. However, MacDonald argues that the women interviewed in this chapter have been involved in the most bloody stage in their fight against the British Army. According to MacDonald, these interviews were the most difficult since she was more afraid of the IRA than any other organization. She felt as if she was their enemy by birth.

=== Chapter 6: Susanna Ronconi ===
The sixth chapter looks at Susanna Ronconi, member of Italy's Red Brigades. According to Ronconi, "She did not believe that the ability to commit violence had anything to do with gender; it was far more connected to one's own makeup, background, and experience."

=== Chapter 7: German Women and Violence ===
The final chapter highlights women in Germany's Red Army Faction and violence. In this chapter, MacDonald explains that there were so many women to choose from that the difficulty was in selecting a few to concentrate on. She claims that women form about 50 percent of the RAF's membership and around 80 percent of the group's supporters. The main question MacDonald attempts to answer in this chapter is why German women in particular are drawn to violence and wonders, "Is it a part of the national psyche? Or have they got more to be angry about?" Head of Germany's anti-terrorist squad attributed it to the advanced state of Germany.

=== Conclusion ===
MacDonald concludes the book by describing the varied motivations of these women terrorists. All these women have broken the taboo. She argues that most of these women "have no intention of being relegated to the kitchen sink or being put back on the pedestal of the mother Madonna." The reasons for why these women turned to violence rests in the combination of their circumstances. She states, "They see themselves as victims not only of what their male comrades would call 'political oppression' but also of male oppression." MacDonald also connects themes of motherhood and maternal instinct across interviews, citing that many women feel guilty about neglecting their children for their cause. Susanna states, "It is the woman who gives life; it is the woman who also takes life." Also, MacDonald returns to her main question of whether women are more ruthless and argues, "It seems then that women, familiar with pain but unfamiliar with violence, and fearful of internal criticism, may overstep the mark in a determined effort to prove themselves." And that a woman may be more motivated than a man because "if her sacrifice is greater, her will to make that sacrifice worthwhile will be stronger. If expectations of her ability are lower, she will have a great deal more to prove."

== Analysis ==
Terrorism scholar Bruce Hoffman commends MacDonald on her attempt to fill an important gap in the terrorism literature, since many scholars are separated from the subjects of their research. Overall, he argues that MacDonald succeeds in revealing the motivations, thought processes, mindsets, and historical consciousness of terrorists. Yet, Hoffman claims that she is less successful in presenting the empirical evidence and systematic analysis needed to prove the book's thesis, "linking gender to a proclivity for greater lethality." The book is methodologically flawed as well, since the "sample" of women is based primarily on accessibility rather than a representative cross-section.

== Reception ==
An LA Times article reviewing MacDonald's book emphasizes that her book is the first to deal exclusively with women terrorists. However, the article finds that "MacDonald turns out to be guilty of the same anti-feminist thinking she criticizes: the stereotype that a woman doesn't get angry on behalf of a cause."

A Chicago Tribune article finds that the book cites little secondary reporting, making it hard to know how reliable or typical the experiences of these women terrorists are.

A Publishers Weekly review states that the book is "thought-provoking and controversial, but disappointingly inconclusive."
