= Mayumi =

Mayumi may refer to:

- Mayumi (name)
- Mayumi (film) (真由美), a 1990 South Korean film directed by Shin Sang-ok
- 9418 Mayumi, a minor planet
