= Kim Hyun-hee =

Kim Hyun-hee may refer to:

- Kim Hyon-hui (table tennis)
- Kim Hyon-hui (Korean: 김현희, born 27 January 1962), North Korean agent; responsible for the Korean Air Flight 858 bombing in 1987.
- Kim Hyun-hee (taekwondo) (born 14 July 1967), South Korean taekwondo practitioner
