= Suh Sang-chul =

South Korean politician (1935–1983)

- Hangul: 서상철
- Hanja: 徐相喆
- RR: Seo Sangcheol
- MR: Sŏ Sangch'ŏl

Suh Sang-chul (Korean: 서상철; 1935–1983) was a South Korean economist, educator and administrator who died in the Rangoon bombing incident.

== Biography ==
Suh Sang-chul was born in Hongseong, Chūseinan Province, Korea, Empire of Japan in 1935. His father, Suh Chang-sun ran a brewery business and his mother was Gwak Bok-sun. Suh graduated from Seoul High School in 1954, and entered the College of Commerce at Seoul National University. In 1955, he went to the United States to study, and finished his undergraduate and graduate studies at the Economics Department of Clark University in Worcester, Massachusetts in 1958 and the following year respectively. Suh studied economic development at Harvard University under the economist and statistician Simon Kuznets, and received his doctorate degree in 1964.

As Suh worked as a professor at Clark University, and at the World Bank, experiencing the international economy and gaining educational experience in economics. In 1972, he returned to South Korea and worked as a professor at the Department of Economy, Korea University. Suh also actively participated in developing economic policies, so he served as a member of the Foreign Economic Committee in 1973, Tax System Audit Committee, and as a director representative of the South Korean branch of the World Bank.

He served as Vice-Minister of Construction and in 1982 was appointed as Minister of Power Resource. Suh died in 1983 in the Rangoon bombing incident in Burma while performing his duties during an unofficial tour by South Korean President Chun Doo-hwan to Southwest Asia and Oceania. Suh was posthumously awarded an honorary Doctor of Laws by his alma mater Clark University in 1984.

== Works ==
- Papers
  - 경제성장에 관한 한국모형 (trans. Korea Model on Economic Growth), (1975) (in Korean)
  - 남북한의 공업화유형비교 (trans. Comparison of North and South Korea's Industrialization type) (1976) (in Korean)
- Books
  - A Study of Regional Development in Korea, (1978), Asiatic Research Center, Korea University Press
  - Growth and Structural Changes in the Korean Economy, 1910–1940 (1976), Cambridge: Council on East Asian Studies, Harvard University

== Awards ==
- Economist Award by Maeil Gyeongje Sinmun in 1975
- Blue Stripes, Order of Service Merit posthumously awarded in 1983

== See also ==
- Chung Un-chan
- Hyun Song Shin
