= Gimpo International Airport bombing =

1986 attack in Seoul, South Korea

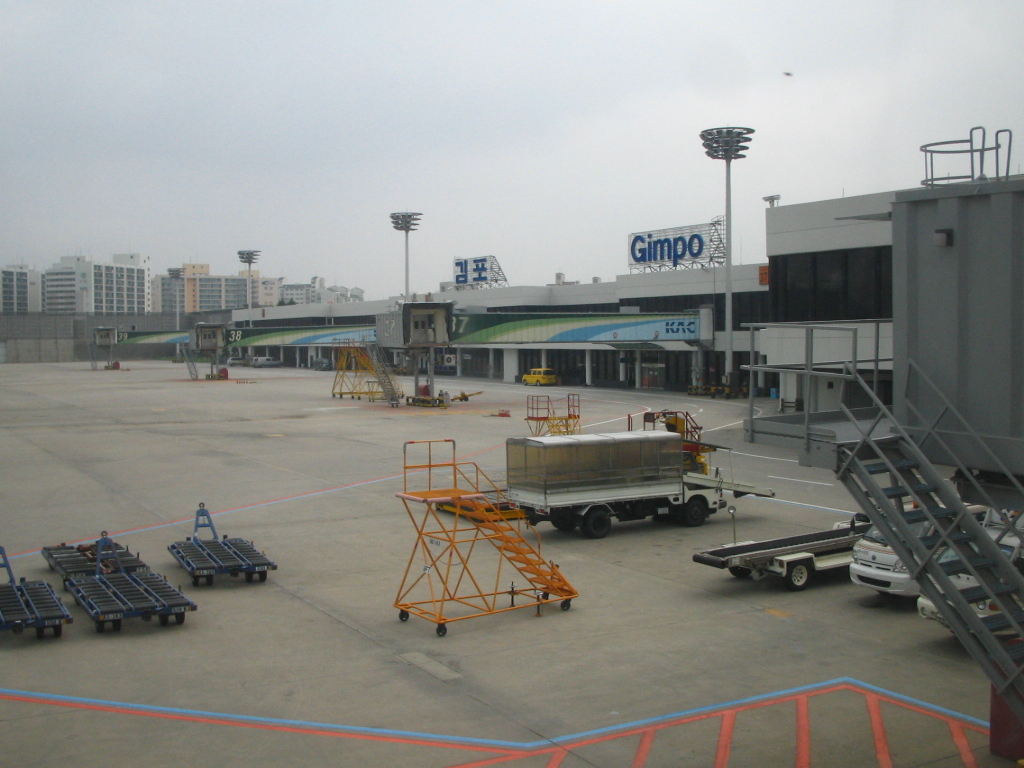
- Terminal in the Gimpo International Airport
- Location: 37.566°N 126.800°E
- Date: 14 September 1986; 3:12 pm (UTC+9)
- Attack type: State terrorism
- Deaths: 5
- Injuries: 30–36
- Perpetrator: North Korea

On 14 September 1986, a bomb blast at Gimpo International Airport, the then-main airport serving Seoul in South Korea, killed five people and injured around 30 others. All the victims were South Koreans.

Officials blamed agents acting on behalf of the government of North Korea for the attack. It took place just six days before the start of the 1986 Asian Games hosted by Seoul. National Police Director Kang Min Chang said North Korea performed the terrorist attack in an attempt to disrupt the Asian Games. He also said the attack was similar to the Rangoon bombing in 1983 when dozens of South Koreans lost their lives.

These bombings, including that of Korean Air Flight 858 in 1987, caused the South Korean government to apply massive security measures for the 1988 Summer Olympics in Seoul.
