= Darr Sann Ye =

Burmese woman who captured Rangoon bombing assassin

Darr Sann Ye (Burmese: ဓားစန်းရီ; lit. 'Knife Sann Yee'; born Sann Ye; 1933) is a Burmese woman who captured Major Zin Bo (also known as Kim Jin-su), a North Korean military officer who was involved in the Rangoon bombing of 9 October 1983. The bombing was an assassination attempt on South Korean President Chun Doo-hwan.

== Life ==
Darr Sann Ye was born in 1933 in Phaungdawthi village, Daik-U, Bago Division, Burma. Growing up during the colonial era, she was not educated. At age 14, she married Nyo Gyi, a train conductor. The couple divorced after having two daughters. She and her eldest daughter Thein Myint moved to Rangoon. She survived by selling smuggled cinema tickets there. She ran a tavern and liquor shop near Pazundaung Creek and often carried a knife for protection. She married Soe Tint, and they had a son. Three years before her husband's death, Sann Ye went to Taunggyi, Shan State in 2000, where her eldest daughter lived. She served as a nun for 16 years.

On 10 October 1983, at 21:00, she saw a strange man diving in Nyaungtan harbour. She suspected the man was Zin Bo. She promptly jumped into the stream and captured him. She and four men, including Bo Gyi and Shwe Min Thar, propelled her to fame overnight for their heroic actions. She was honoured by the Burmese government for her hard work. As she got older, she became homeless and survived by begging on the Hledan flyover. Following the 2021 Myanmar coup d'état, she participated in anti-coup movements.

== Popular culture ==
She was portrayed by Moht Moht Myint Aung in 2009 film Darr Sann Ye. She is the subject of a documentary film by Nyein Nyein Aung which depicted her life and the capture of Zin Bo.

After learning about Darr Sann Ye's life on Facebook in 2017, Ma Nyein Nyein Aung went in search of the 90-year-old, who was living in a thatched hut in Shwe Pyi Thar.
