= The Tears of My Soul =

1993 book by Kim Hyon Hui

- Author: Kim Hyon-hui
- Subject: Autobiography
- Publisher: William Morrow and Co.
- ISBN: 0-688-12833-5

The Tears of My Soul (Korean: 이제 여자가 되고 싶어요 – 내영혼의 눈물; lit. 'Now, I wish to become a woman – My soul's tears') is the memoir of Kim Hyon-hui, a former North Korean agent known for planting the bomb on board Korean Air Flight 858. This book recounts one of North Korea's state-sponsored acts of terror.

Kim tells the story of how she was trained as a spy and assigned a mission given by Kim Jong-il to blow up a South Korean airliner. The book details her early training and life as a party member in Macau, Hainan, and across Europe; her terrorist act; and her consequent trial, reprieve, and integration into South Korean society.

The book has been translated into a number of languages, including German.

On page 3 of the book Kim writes:

This book is dedicated to the families of the victims of Flight 858. All proceeds deriving from the book will be donated to them.

Rémi Kauffer, in The Black Book of Communism, has some reservations about the truthfulness of The Tears of My Soul, writing in 1997, "It is still too soon to determine how much of the book is fabrication".
