= Capital punishment in Myanmar =

Capital punishment in Myanmar is a legal penalty. Myanmar is classified as a "retentionist" state. Before 25 July 2022, Myanmar was considered "abolitionist in practice," meaning it had not executed anyone in the past ten years or more and was believed to have had an established practice or policy against carrying out executions.

Between 1988 and 2022, no legal executions were carried out in the country. Between 1989 and the installation of Myanmar's military junta government in 2021, there were also no death sentences handed down; in the wake of the coup, the junta sentenced hundreds of citizens to death for what Voice of America called "political activity". In July 2022, four pro-democracy activists, including Zayar Thaw and Kyaw Min Yu, were executed, ending a 33-year moratorium.

In September 2024, military junta authorities announced their plans to execute five more pro-democracy activists – Myat Phyo Pwint, Kaung Pyae Sone Oo, San Min Aung, Kyaw Win Soe, and Zayyar Phyo – who had been sentenced to die for their involvement in the murder of a police officer. Their death sentences had been handed down in August 2021. By September 2024, the plans to execute them were well underway, given that the inmates were weighed and measured in preparation for their hangings, the gallows had been prepared for their executions, and the five condemned inmates were allowed family visits; activists estimated the military junta would execute the five by 24 September 2024.

There have been at least 25,000 extrajudicial killings since the start of the Rohingya genocide on 9 October 2016. Also, two de facto autonomous states, Wa State and Mong La, are reported to carry out executions.

Myanmar abstained from voting regarding the 2020 United Nations moratorium on the death penalty.

There were at least 86 new death sentences in Myanmar in 2021. This was a significant increase on previous years; Amnesty International has attributed this to the 2021 Myanmar coup d'état, and the subsequent martial law since February of that year.

Myanmar is one of only three countries that was believed to have people on death row for crimes committed as juveniles as of 24 May 2022; Myanmar is believed to have at least two juveniles on death row, along with 80 in Iran, and five in the Maldives. Myanmar also sentenced people to death in absentia in 2021, as well as sentenced people to death in trials considered unfair, according to Amnesty International.

== Methods, practices, and laws ==
Yan-aung Maung Maung, a former prison warden who oversaw seven executions during his tenure at a Myanmar prison, wrote in his autobiography that Myanmar's execution method was long-drop hanging, adopted from the time Myanmar was a British territory then known as Burma. The executions he oversaw took place in the mid-1980s, and his autobiography details how Myanmar's method of hanging borrows several tenets of the British long-drop hanging method, including the use of a rope with a metal eyelet rather than a coiled noose, and the utilization of a gallows that permitted a very lengthy drop, as well as the practice of calculating condemned inmates' weights and neck diameters and subsequently consulting an official table recommending drop distances. The hanging method in Myanmar is intended to break the condemned inmate's neck and effect instant, deep unconsciousness and death.

Myanmar has multiple gallows located at different prisons throughout the country. In early 2022, the State Administration Council, Myanmar's military junta that governed the country from 2021 to 2025, ordered the country's gallows to be refurbished in preparation for the country to start carrying out executions again. The refurbishment of Insein Prison's gallows involved installing a new roof over the structure, which non-death sentenced inmates at the prison alleged was built to prevent overhead surveillance of any executions. Yan-aung Maung Maung also wrote in his autobiography that every jail's gallows structures in Myanmar's gallows were all modeled after the gallows at Alipore Central Jail in Kolkata, in India, with a near ground-level platform with two hinged trap doors concealing a large and deep concrete space that could accommodate a long drop; the gallows had a large trap door that could accommodate two simultaneous hangings.

In the July 2022 executions of Zayar Thaw, Kyaw Min Yu, and two other pro-democracy activists, Myanmar used hanging as their method of carrying out the sentences. Those executions took place in Insein Prison near Yangon. The prison's Deputy Chief sent confirmation to the men's families notifying them of the completed executions, but the confirmation included no information regarding the exact times of the executions. The men's families went to the prison after the executions with the hopes of seeing their bodies, as the prison's regulations stipulated that the families of executed inmates would be allowed to claim the bodies of their dead loved ones "unless there is a special reason" otherwise.

In April 2023, the State Administration Council commuted 38 active death sentences to life imprisonment in a gesture of "amnesty". After the commutations, there were still over 100 other political prisoners on the country's death row.

In July 2026, with the passage of the "Anti-Online Scam Bill," Myanmar's parliament added participation in cyberscams as another death penalty-eligible offense. The law was the first passed by Myanmar's new government under President Min Aung Hlaing, a former junta chief. This was despite the fact that in April 2026, Min Aung Hlaing commuted all the country's remaining death sentences to life imprisonment.
