= Rangoon bombing =

1983 attempted killing of the South Korean president

- Part of the Korean conflict
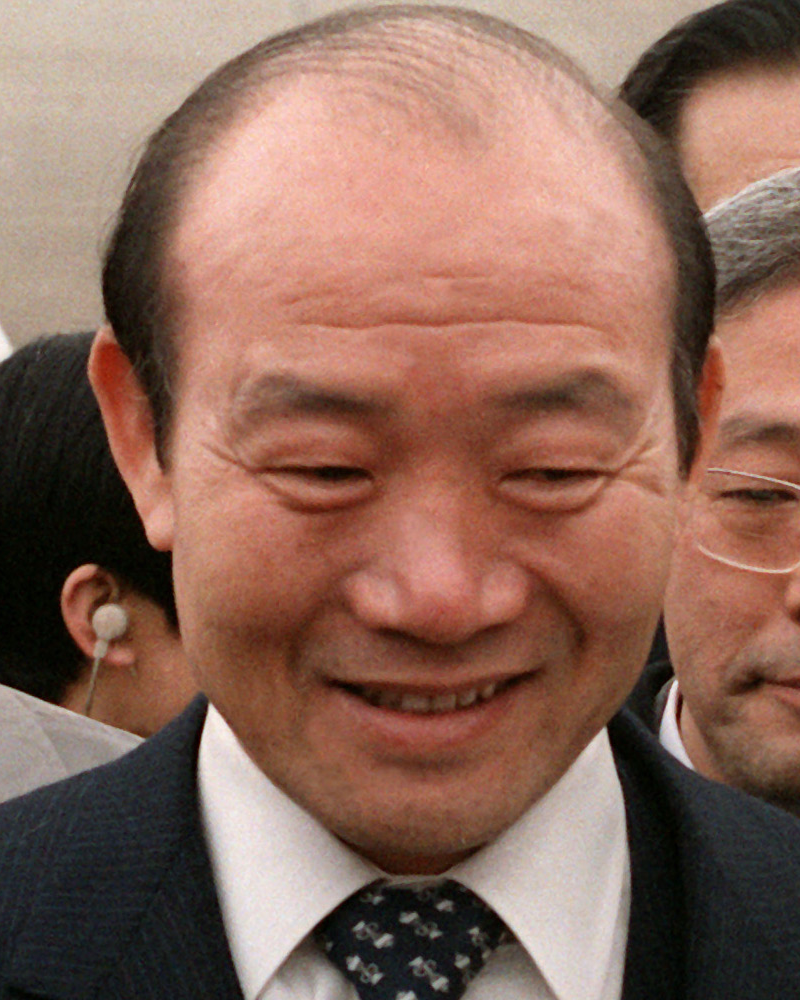
- Chun Doo-hwan, the intended target, in 1981
- Date: 9 October 1983
- Time: 10:25 a.m. (UTC+6:30)
- Location: Martyrs' Mausoleum, Rangoon, Burma; 16.802536°N 96.147658°E
- Also known as: Rangoon incident
- Target: Chun Doo-hwan
- Perpetrator: North Korea
- Deaths: 21
- Injuries: 46
- Suspects: 3 North Koreans (Kang Min-chul and 2 others)
- Convictions: Kang Min-chul: life imprisonment Others: death sentence

The Rangoon bombing of 9 October 1983 was an assassination attempt orchestrated by North Korea against Chun Doo-hwan, the fifth president of South Korea, in Rangoon, Burma. Although Chun survived, 21 people died in the attack and 46 were injured. One suspect was later killed, and the two other suspected bombers were captured, one of whom confessed to being a North Korean military officer.

== Bombing ==
On 9 October 1983, President Chun Doo-hwan flew to the Burmese capital, Rangoon, on an official visit. He had planned to lay a wreath at the Martyrs' Mausoleum to commemorate Aung San, one of the founders of independent Burma who was assassinated in 1947. As some of the president's staff began assembling at the mausoleum, one of three bombs concealed in the roof exploded. The huge blast ripped through the crowd below, killing 21 people and wounding 46 others. Four senior South Korean politicians were killed: foreign minister Lee Bum Suk; minister of power resource Suh Sang-chul; economic planning minister and deputy prime minister Suh Suk-joon; and minister for commerce and industry Kim Dong-hwi. Fourteen South Korean presidential advisers, journalists, and security officials were killed; four Burmese nationals, including three journalists, were also among the dead. President Chun's car was delayed in traffic and he was only minutes from arriving at the memorial. The bomb was reportedly detonated early because the presidential bugle signalling Chun's arrival mistakenly rang out a few minutes ahead of schedule.

== Perpetrators ==
Burmese police identified three suspects: a Korean People's Army major and two captains. A police investigation revealed that they had slipped off a ship docked in Rangoon port, and had received explosives in a North Korean diplomatic mission. Suspect Kang Min-chul and another attacker attempted to commit suicide by blowing themselves up with a hand grenade that same day, but survived and were arrested, although Kang lost his right arm while the other man, Kim Jin-su, lost both an eye and an arm. Kim Jin-su was captured by a woman named Darr Sann Ye and four men, including Bo Gyi and Shwe Min Thar. A third suspect, Shin Ki-chul, went missing. He managed to kill three soldiers before being shot dead. Kang Min-chul confessed his mission and links to North Korea, an action by which he was able to avoid a death sentence and instead received life imprisonment. His colleague Kim Jin-su refused to confess or cooperate with investigations and was executed by hanging. North Korea denied any links to Kang, who was sent to Insein Prison, north of Rangoon.

== Aftermath ==
The United States quietly provided military and logistics support to ensure that the surviving delegates and bodies of the deceased were safely returned to Korea. According to Victor Cha, an academic and former Director for Asian Affairs in the National Security Council, a South Korean official recounted to him the sentiment that "this is what only a true ally like the United States was capable of doing, in ways that would never become public but would be remembered."

As a result of the bombing, Burma suspended diplomatic relations with North Korea. China, which had passed on a diplomatic note requesting trilateral talks between North and South Korea and the US on North Korea's behalf just prior to the bombing, reprimanded North Korea in the state media. Chinese officials refused to meet or talk with North Korean officials for months afterward.

In 1994, the representative of South Korea to the United Nations General Assembly linked this incident with the downing of Korean Air Flight 858, which he alleged was sponsored by the same government acting with impunity. As a result, North Korea has been listed as a state sponsor of terrorism by the United States ever since (except between 2008 and November 2017).

== Kang's fate ==
An undated photo of Kang Min-chul taken in 1983.

One of the suspects, Kang Min-chul was Myanmar's longest-serving prisoner. He learned to speak the Burmese language fluently according to one of his fellow prisoners. He also learned to climb mango trees with one arm and converted to Christianity. Kang received the biblical name "Matthew" after an inmate baptized him. Myanmar's moves towards resuming relations with North Korea led to speculation about what would happen to Kang. Because North Korea denied that he was a North Korean citizen, he may have been considered a stateless person. Kang reportedly did not want to go to North Korea, which he believed considered him a traitor (because of his having revealed its criminal operations); or to South Korea, which might have tried him for his role in the assassination attempt. He also worried for the safety of his mother and sister back in North Korea.

In 2006, Chung Hyung-keun, a member of South Korea's Grand National Party and a former employee of South Korean intelligence, sponsored a bill to bring Kang to South Korea. Kang died of liver cancer on 18 May 2008 at the age of 53 while being transferred to the hospital from Insein Prison of Rangoon. It is not known what happened to Kang's remains.

== List of victims ==
- Suh Seok-jun (서석준, 1938–1983), Deputy Prime Minister
- Lee Bum Suk (이범석, 1925–1983), Minister of Foreign Affairs
- Kim Dong-hwi (김동휘), Minister of Commerce
- Suh Sang-chul (서상철), Minister of Power Resources
- Ham Byeong-chun (함병춘), Chief Presidential Secretary
- Lee Gye-cheol (이계철), Ambassador to Burma
- Kim Jae-ik (김재익, 1938–1983), Senior Presidential Secretary for Economic Affairs
- Ha Dong-seon (하동선), Planning Director of International Cooperation Committee
- Lee Gi-uk (이기욱), Vice Minister of Finance
- Gang In-hui (강인희), Vice Minister of Agriculture, Forest, Fishery
- Kim Yong-hwan (김용환), Vice Minister of Science and Technology
- Sim Sang-u (심상우, 1938–1983), a member of the National Assembly
- Min Byeong-seok (민병석), physician in attendance on the President
- Lee Jae-gwan (이재관), presidential press secretary
- Han Gyeong-hui (한경희), a presidential guard
- Jeong Tae-jin (정태진), a presidential guard
- Lee Jung-hyeon (이중현), reporter of The Dong-A Ilbo

== See also ==
- Illicit activities of North Korea
- Blue House Raid
- Sejong Institute
