= Mayumi (film) =

1990 film by Shin Sang-ok

- Theatrical release poster
- Directed by: Shin Sang-ok
- Written by: Shin Bong-seung
- Produced by: Sin Myeong-gil
- Starring: Kim Sora
- Cinematography: Koo Joong-mo
- Edited by: Kim Hyeon
- Music by: Kang In-goo
- Distributed by: Kil Films Co., Ltd.
- Release date: June 9, 1990
- Running time: 110 minutes
- Country: South Korea
- Language: Korean

Mayumi (Korean: 마유미) also known as Mayumi: Virgin Terrorist is a 1990 South Korean drama thriller film directed by Shin Sang-ok based on the bombing of Korean Air Flight 858. The film was selected as the South Korean entry for the Best Foreign Language Film at the 63rd Academy Awards, but it was not accepted as a nominee.

== Plot ==
Two North Korean agents, carrying Japanese passports bearing the names "Shinichi" and "Mayumi", plan to blow up a Seoul-bound plane in mid-air. They are diverted to another plane after they have planted the bomb. When the plane crashes, killing all on board, the two plan to commit suicide. The man succeeds, but the woman is saved through medical intervention. When she witnesses the suffering of the surviving families of the bombing victims, she begs to be executed, believing it is the only fitting punishment for her actions.

The film is based on the life of Kim Hyon Hui, a North Korean agent whose Japanese teacher was Yaeko Taguchi, a Japanese abductee; she was paroled in 1998, and 12 years later she met Yaeko's son Kochi and told him that his mother was still alive.

== Cast ==
- Kim Sora (Kim Seo-ra) as Mayumi
- Lee Hak-jae: Shin'ichi
- Shin Seong-il
- George Kennedy as Ian Henderson
- Reiko Oshida as Yaeko Taguchi
- Yoon Il-bong
- Yoon Yang-ha
- Choi Jong-won
- Lee Ho-seong
- Choi Yun-seok

== See also ==
- List of submissions to the 63rd Academy Awards for Best Foreign Language Film
- List of South Korean submissions for the Academy Award for Best Foreign Language Film

== Bibliography ==
- "Mayumi Virgin Terrorist". The Complete Index to World Film. Archived from the original on 2012-08-29.
- 마유미. Cine21 (in Korean).
