= List of terrorist incidents in 1987 =

This is a timeline of incidents in 1987 that have been labelled as "terrorism" and are not believed to have been carried out by a government or its forces (see state terrorism and state-sponsored terrorism).

== Guidelines ==
- To be included, entries must be notable (have a stand-alone article) and described by a consensus of reliable sources as "terrorism".
- List entries must comply with the guidelines outlined in the manual of style under MOS:TERRORIST.
- Casualty figures in this list are the total casualties of the incident including immediate casualties and later casualties (such as people who succumbed to their wounds long after the attacks occurred).
- Casualties listed are the victims. Perpetrator casualties are listed separately (e.g. x (+y) indicate that x victims and y perpetrators were killed/injured).
- Casualty totals may be underestimated or unavailable due to a lack of information. A figure with a plus (+) sign indicates that at least that many people have died (e.g. 10+ indicates that at least 10 people have died) – the actual toll could be considerably higher. A figure with a plus (+) sign may also indicate that over that number of people are victims.
- If casualty figures are 20 or more, they will be shown in **bold**. In addition, figures for casualties more than 50 will also be **underlined**.
- Incidents are limited to one per location per day. If multiple attacks occur in the same place on the same day, they will be merged into a single incident.
- In addition to the guidelines above, the table also includes the following categories:

0 people were killed/injured by the incident.
1–19 people were killed/injured by the incident.
20–49 people were killed/injured by the incident.
50–99 people were killed/injured by the incident.
100+ people were killed/injured by the incident.

== List ==
Date	Type	Dead	Injured	Location	Article	Details	Perpetrator	Part of
April 17	Massacre	127	64	North Central Province, Sri Lanka	Aluth Oya massacre	127 Sinhalese civilians, who were travelling in 3 buses and 2 trucks to Trincomalee were killed by cadres of Liberation Tigers of Tamil Eelam organization, commonly known as LTTE. The cadres clad in military uniforms stopped the vehicles and dragged out the passengers and shot them to death with automatic weapons after brutally assaulting them with clubs. The near the village of Aluth Oya, on the Habarana Trincomalle road in North Central Province of Sri Lanka.	LTTE	Sri Lankan Civil War
April 21	Car bombing	110	Unknown	Colombo, Sri Lanka	Colombo Central Bus Station bombing	Car bomb at bus terminal kills 110 people. This attack was carried by LTTE.	LTTE	Sri Lankan Civil War
June 2	Massacre	34	4	Ampara District, Sri Lanka		A bus carrying Buddhist monks was stopped and 30 Buddhist monks and four civilians were killed by LTTE.	LTTE	Sri Lankan Civil War
June 19	Car bombing	21	45	Barcelona, Spain	1987 Hipercor bombing	A car bomb at the Hipercor shopping centre placed by Basque separatist group ETA kills 21 people and injures 45 more.	ETA	Basque conflict
June 20	Massacre	32		Ömerli, Mardin, Turkey	Pınarcık massacre	The Pınarcık massacre was the killing of 24 Kurdish women and children and eight village guards in the village of Pınarcık, by units of the Kurdistan Workers' Party (PKK). The dead consisted of 16 children, eight village guards, and eight women	Kurdistan Workers' Party	Kurdish–Turkish conflict (1978–present)
July 7	Massacre	34	30+	Haryana, India	1987 Punjab killings	Sikh militants from the Khalistan Commando Force massacre 34 Hindu bus passengers after setting up a fake road block.	Khalistan Commando Force	Punjab insurgency
August 18	Grenade attack	2	16	Sri Jayawardenepura Kotte, Sri Lanka	1987 grenade attack in the Sri Lankan Parliament	A member of the communist Janatha Vimukthi Peramuna (People's Liberation Front) threw two hand grenades into the Parliament of Sri Lanka, narrowly missing president J. R. Jayewardene and prime minister Ranasinghe Premadasa and killing an MP and a Ministry secretary.	Janatha Vimukthi Peramuna	JVP insurgency
November 8	Bombing	12	63	Enniskillen, Northern Ireland	Remembrance Day bombing	PIRA Bombing targeting a group of Ulster Defence Regiment soldiers at a remembrance service for those lost in conflict. Most of the deaths were civilians.	PIRA	The Troubles
December 11	Car bombing	11	88	Zaragoza, Spain	1987 Zaragoza Barracks bombing	ETA car bombing targeting a Civil Guard barracks. 11 people, five of them children, were killed and 88 people, mostly civilians, wounded.	ETA	Basque conflict
