= Lee Bum Suk (foreign minister) =

South Korean politician (1925–1983)

Minister of Foreign Affairs
- In office June 2, 1982 – October 9, 1983
- Preceded by: Lho Shin-yong
- Succeeded by: Lee Won-kyung

Personal details
- Born: September 14, 1925 Keijō, Korea, Empire of Japan
- Died: October 9, 1983 (aged 58) Rangoon, Burma
- Resting place: Seoul National Cemetery
- Spouse: Lee Jeong-suk
- Children: 5

Korean name
- Hangul: 이범석
- Hanja: 李範錫
- RR: I Beomseok
- MR: I Pŏmsŏk

Lee Bum Suk (Korean: 이범석; 1925–1983) was the Foreign Minister of South Korea from 1982 until his death in 1983. He was among the victims of the Rangoon bombing in Myanmar.

== Early life ==
Lee was born in 1925 in Keijō. He and his family later moved to Heijō, where he graduated from the Second Middle School in 1942. Following his graduation, he went to Japan for his higher studies and completed the preparatory course at Hosei University in 1944. In September 1945, immediately after the independence of Korea from Japanese rule, he graduated from Korea University in 1946 with degree in economics. He later attended University of Maryland in 1961 and George Washington University in 1963.

Lee served as Head of the Korean Junior Red Cross and later served as advisor to the Korean Red Cross.

== Diplomatic career ==
Lee was appointed a diplomat during the regime of South Korean President Park Chung Hee. In 1961, He was appointed Director of the International Organizations Department of the Ministry of Foreign Affairs. In 1963, he continued to serve as Assistant to the Ambassador at the UN and the United States. In 1965, Lee was appointed research fellow at Korea National Diplomatic Academy and in 1966, he became the Head of Protocols at the Ministry of Foreign Affairs.

In 1970, Lee was appointed the South Korean ambassador to Tunisia. In 1971, following the end of his tenure as ambassador to Tunisia, he was appointed the Vice President of the Korean Red Cross. In 1976, he was assigned as the South Korean ambassador to India. During his time as ambassador to India, he made considerable achievements in establishing diplomatic relations with India, which was one of the leading countries in the Non-Aligned Movement. This was possible due to close friendship with then Prime Minister of India Indira Gandhi.

From 1980 to 1982, he served as the head of the Center for Reunification, Secretary-General for the Committee for Peaceful Reunification Policies, and Head Secretary for the President, before being appointed Foreign Minister in 1983.

On June 29, 1983, one year after taking office as Foreign Minister, he gave a speech at the National Defense University, saying:

"Normalization of relations with the Soviet Union and China is an important task for Korean diplomacy."

During the speech, he used the term Nordpolitik and presented it as a goal of normalized relations with the closest allies to North Korea, China and the Soviet Union. When President Roh Tae-woo took office in 1988, he used Nordpolitik as a foreign policy toward the communist bloc.

== Death ==
In 1983, ahead of a trip to six countries in Southwest Asia and Oceania by President Chun Doo-hwan and First Lady Lee Soon-ja, he opposed going to Burma before India. However, the suggestion was ignored. In the end, Lee Beom-seok went to Burma with Chun Doo-hwan. On October 9, Lee was part of the presidential staff who assembled early at Martyrs' Mausoleum, when one of three bombs concealed in the roof by North Korean agents exploded. The huge blast ripped through the crowd below, killing 21 people and wounding 46 others. Fourteen South Korean ministers including Lee, presidential advisers, journalists, and security officials were killed. Four Burmese nationals, including three journalists, were also among the dead. President Chun was saved because his car had been delayed in traffic and was only minutes from arriving at the memorial.

Lee is buried at Seoul National Cemetery.

== Personal life ==
Lee was married to Lee Jeong-suk, with whom he had four daughters and one son.
