= Mayumi Kimura =

Japanese biologist

Mayumi Kimura is a Japanese biologist and the administrative director of the International Institute for Integrative Sleep Medicine at the University of Tsukaba in Tsukaba, Japan. Her work focuses on the biological mechanisms of sleep-wake regulation.

== Education and career ==
Kimura earned her Master's of Science in biology from Kanazawa University and her Ph.D. in physiology at Tokyo Medical and Dental University. She served as a research group leader at the Max Planck Institute of Psychiatry from 2003 to 2018.

== Selected publications ==
- Yu, W. H., et al. "Role of leptin in hypothalamic–pituitary function." Proceedings of the National Academy of Sciences 94.3 (1997): 1023-1028.
- Steiger, Axel, and Mayumi Kimura. "Wake and sleep EEG provide biomarkers in depression." Journal of psychiatric research 44.4 (2010): 242-252.
- McCann, Samuel M., et al. "The mechanism of action of cytokines to control the release of hypothalamic and pituitary hormones in infection." Annals of the New York Academy of Sciences 917.1 (2000): 4-18.
