= Korean Air Flight 858 =

1987 aircraft bombing over the Andaman Sea

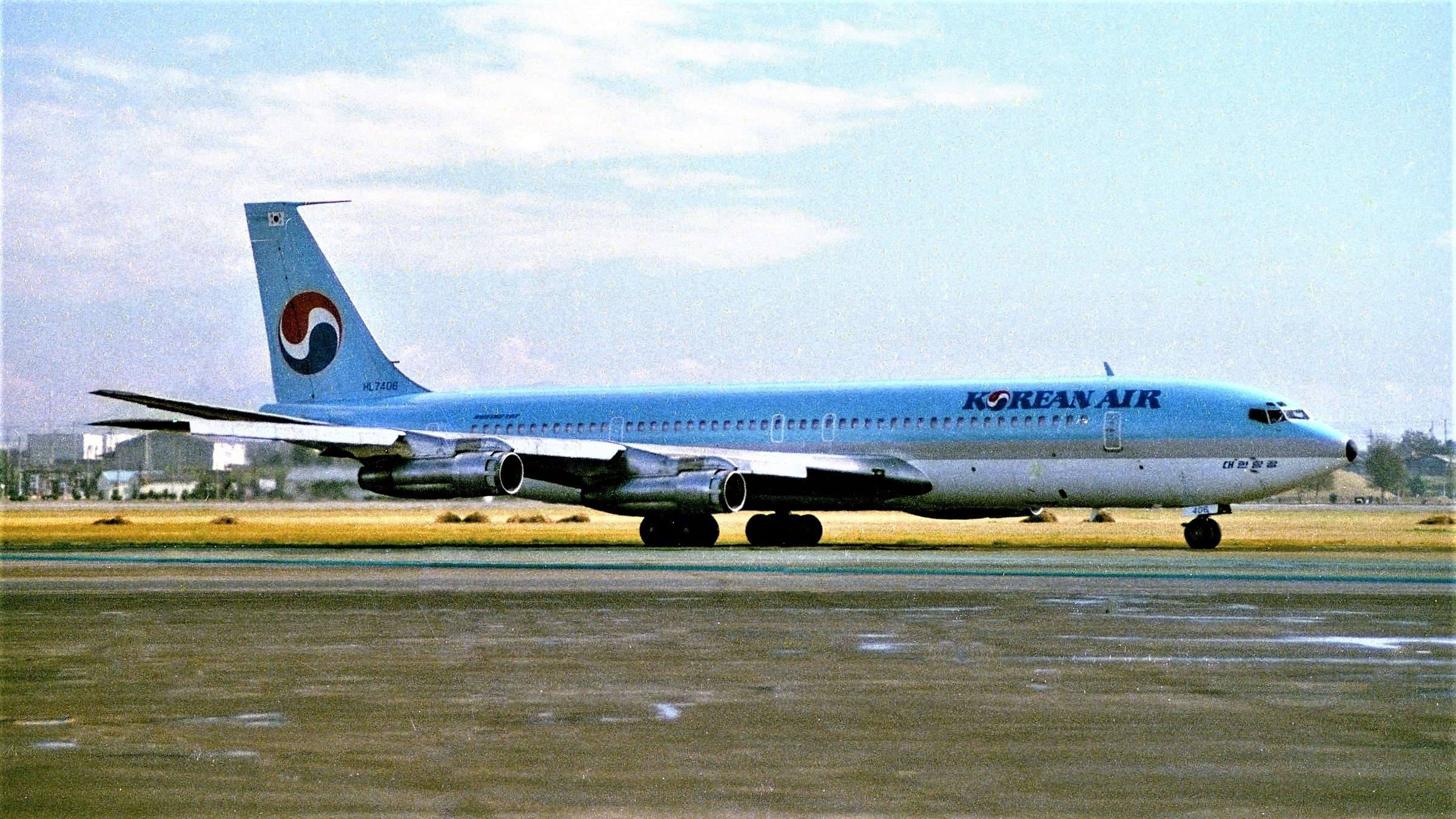
- HL7406, the aircraft involved, pictured months before the bombing

Bombing
- Date: 29 November 1987
- Summary: Terrorist bombing orchestrated by North Korean government
- Site: Near Moscos Islands, Andaman Sea; 14.55°N 97.38°E

Aircraft
- Aircraft type: Boeing 707-3B5C
- Operator: Korean Air
- IATA flight No.: KE858
- ICAO flight No.: KAL858
- Call sign: KOREAN AIR 858
- Registration: HL7406
- Flight origin: Saddam International Airport, Baghdad, Iraq
- 1st stopover: Abu Dhabi International Airport, Abu Dhabi, United Arab Emirates
- 2nd stopover: Don Mueang International Airport, Bangkok, Thailand
- Destination: Gimpo International Airport, Seoul, South Korea
- Occupants: 115
- Passengers: 104
- Crew: 11
- Fatalities: 115
- Survivors: 0

Korean Air Flight 858 was a scheduled international passenger flight between Baghdad, Iraq, and Seoul, South Korea. On 29 November 1987, the Boeing 707 flying the route exploded in mid-air upon the detonation of a bomb planted inside an overhead storage bin in the airplane's passenger cabin by two North Korean agents.

The agents, acting upon orders from the North Korean government, planted the device before disembarking from the aircraft during the first stop-over, in Abu Dhabi, United Arab Emirates. While the aircraft was flying over the Andaman Sea to its second stop-over, in Bangkok, Thailand, the bomb detonated and destroyed the Korean Air Boeing 707-3B5C. Everyone aboard the airliner was killed, a total of 104 passengers and 11 crew members, almost all of whom were South Korean. The attack occurred 34 years after the Korean Armistice Agreement that ended the hostilities of the Korean War on 27 July 1953.

The two bombers were traced to Bahrain, where they both took ampules of cyanide hidden in cigarettes when they realized they were about to be taken into custody. The man died, but the woman, Kim Hyon-hui, survived and later confessed to the bombing. She was sentenced to death after being put on trial for the attack, but was later pardoned by the President of South Korea, Roh Tae-woo because it was deemed that she had been brainwashed in North Korea. Kim's testimony implicated Kim Jong Il, who at that time was the future supreme leader of North Korea, as the person ultimately responsible for the incident. The United States Department of State specifically refers to the bombing of KAL 858 as a "terrorist act" and, except between 2008 and 2017, has since included North Korea on its State Sponsors of Terrorism list. Since the attack, diplomatic relations between North Korea and South Korea have not significantly improved, although some progress has been made in the form of four Inter-Korean summits. Kim Hyon-hui later released a book, The Tears of My Soul, in which she recalled being trained in an espionage school run by the Korean People's Army, and being told by her superiors that Kim Jong Il personally gave the order for the attack. She was branded a traitor by North Korea and became a critic of North Korea after seeing South Korea. Kim now resides in exile, and under constant tight security, fearing that the North Korean government wants to kill her. "Being a culprit, I do have a sense of agony with which I must fight", she said at a press conference in 1990. "In that sense I must still be a prisoner or a captive—of a sense of guilt."

== Background ==
On 12 November 1987, two North Korean agents, Kim Sung-Il (김승일; 金勝一) and Kim Hyon-hui, traveled from Pyongyang, North Korea, on an airliner to Moscow, the capital of the Soviet Union. From there, the agents left for Budapest, Hungary, the following morning, where they stayed in the house of a North Korean agent for six days. On 18 November, the pair traveled to Vienna, Austria, by car. After crossing the Austrian border, the guidance officer with whom they had stayed in Budapest gave the pair two forged Japanese passports, posing as tourists, father Shinichi Hachiya (蜂谷 眞一 Hachiya Shin'ichi) and daughter Mayumi Hachiya (蜂谷 眞由美 Hachiya Mayumi) staying in the Am Parkring Hotel in Vienna, The two purchased tickets from Austrian Airlines for flights that would take them from Vienna to Belgrade, Yugoslavia (now Serbia), then on to Baghdad, Abu Dhabi, and finally Bahrain. They also purchased tickets from Abu Dhabi to Rome, Italy, for use in escaping after planting the bomb on the KAL flight.

On 27 November, two guidance officers who had arrived in Yugoslavia by train from Vienna gave them the time bomb, a Panasonic transistor radio made in Japan, which contained explosives, a detonator, and a bottle of liquid explosive intended to intensify the blast, disguised as a liquor bottle. The next day, they left Belgrade for Saddam International Airport, Baghdad, Iraq, on an Iraqi Airways flight. At the airport, they waited three hours and 30 minutes for the arrival of KAL 858—the target of their operation—which took off at around 11:30 p.m. The two bombers planted the improvised explosive device above their seats, 7B and 7C, and disembarked the aircraft at Abu Dhabi International Airport.

After the attack, the bombers attempted to fly from Abu Dhabi to Amman, Jordan—the first leg of their planned escape route—but there were complications with airport authorities regarding their travel visas; therefore, they were forced to fly to Bahrain, where they agreed they would travel to Rome. However, the authorities there became suspicious about their travel movements and the bombers' passports were identified as forgeries at the airport in Bahrain. Realising that they were about to be taken into custody, they both attempted suicide by ingesting cyanide hidden inside cigarettes. Kim Sung-il (as Shinichi Hachiya) was rushed to the hospital where he was pronounced dead, but the female, 25-year-old Kim Hyon-hui (as Mayumi Hachiya), survived. The body of Kim Sung-il was sent to South Korea and subsequently buried in the Cemetery for North Korean and Chinese Soldiers.

== Aircraft ==
The aircraft operating as Flight 858 was a Boeing 707-3B5C, registered HL7406. It made its first flight in 1971 and was the only 707 purchased by the airline. At the time of its destruction, the aircraft was 16 years old and had accumulated 36,000 flying hours. Around a month before the attack, it had been recently repainted in the new Korean Air livery with an official airline sticker for the upcoming 1988 Summer Olympics in Seoul.

== Flight and explosion ==
The aircraft took off from Saddam International Airport (later renamed Baghdad International Airport) in Baghdad, Iraq around 11:30 p.m. (20:30 UTC), flying to Gimpo International Airport in Gangseo District, Seoul, South Korea, with stops at Abu Dhabi International Airport in Abu Dhabi, United Arab Emirates, and Don Mueang International Airport in Bangkok, Thailand.

On the second leg of the flight, from Abu Dhabi to Thailand, KAL 858 was carrying 104 passengers and 11 crew members. At around 2:05 p.m. Korean Standard Time (05:05 UTC), nine hours after the bomb had been planted and near the end of the flight, the bomb detonated and the aircraft crashed into the Andaman Sea (14.55°N 97.3833°E) twenty-nine kilometres (18 mi; 16 nmi) west of the Burmese coast, killing all 115 on board. The pilot transmitted his final radio message shortly before the explosion: "We expect to arrive in Bangkok on time. Time and location normal."

One hundred thirteen of the people aboard were South Korean nationals, along with an Indian national and a Lebanese national. Many of the 113 South Korean nationals were young workers who were returning to their home country after working for several years in the construction industry in the Middle East. A South Korean diplomat, who worked at the embassy in Baghdad, and his wife, were also aboard the flight, though it is not known if they were the prime targets of the attack. Wreckage from the flight was found inland in Thailand around 140 kilometres (87 mi; 76 nmi) from where the detonation is thought to have occurred. The flight data recorder and cockpit voice recorder were not located.

== Investigation ==
According to testimony at a United Nations Security Council meeting, on 15 December 1987, Kim was transferred to Seoul, South Korea, where she recovered from the poison and, initially, said she was a Chinese orphan who grew up in Japan and said that she was not connected to the attack. Authorities grew more suspicious when, while being questioned in Bahrain, she attacked a police officer and attempted to grab his firearm, before being apprehended. At the hearing, the main evidence against Kim was the cigarettes, which, analysis showed, were the type used by a number of other North Korean agents apprehended in South Korea. Another notable evidence against Kim was the teeth of her comrade Kim Sung Il, who had cavities which had been filled with soldered lead, a common method of cavity treatment in dentistry in North Korea.

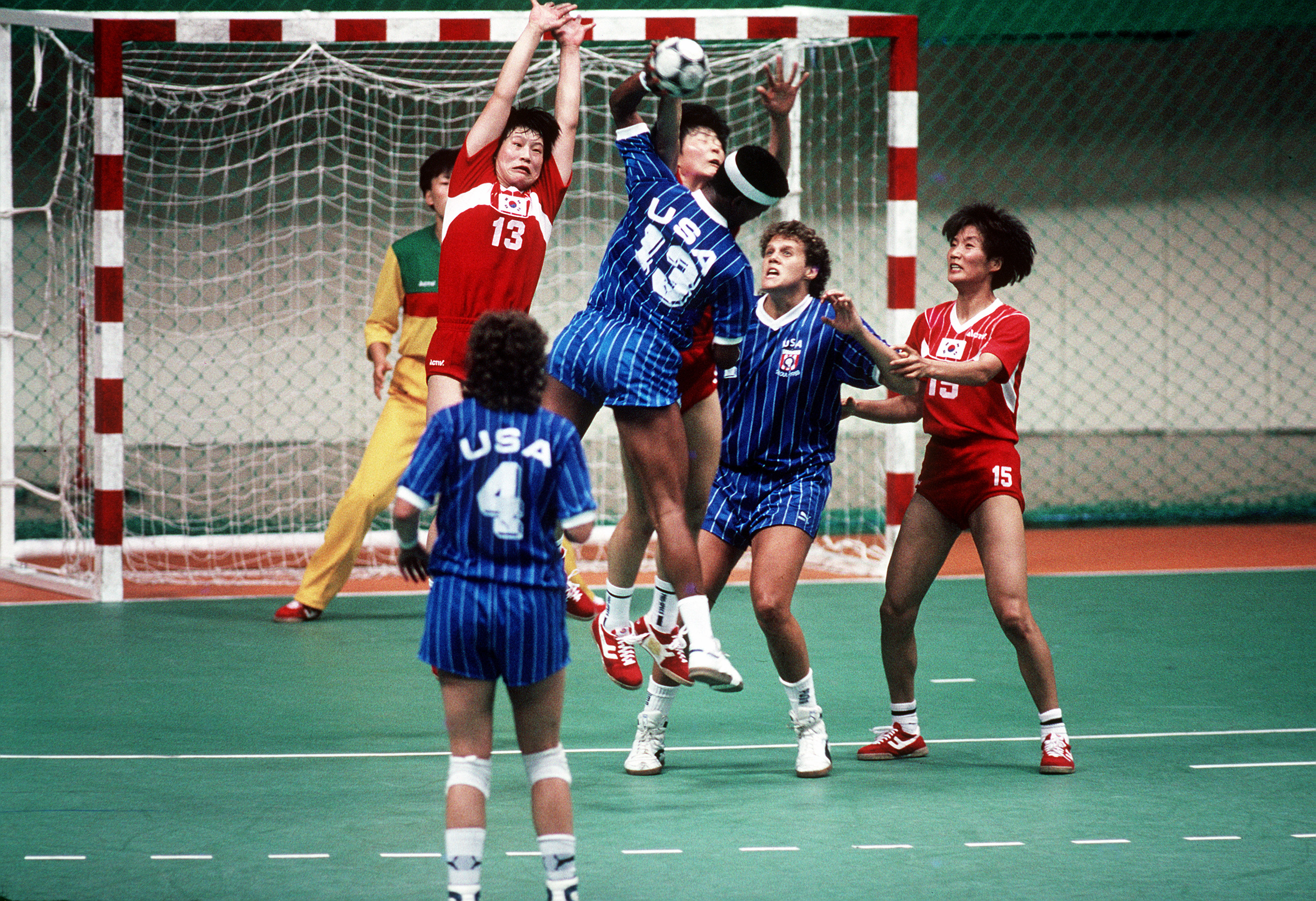
In January 1988, Kim said at a press conference that the Government of North Korea ordered the attack to frighten teams from attending the 1988 Seoul Olympics.

Speaking at the United Nations Security Council, Choi Young-jin, representing South Korea, said that after eight days of interrogation in South Korea, she was permitted to see a film of life in the country on a television screen, and realized that "life ... on the streets of Seoul was entirely different from what she had been led to believe." She had been taught that South Korea was an American puppet state that was fraught with poverty and corruption. However, when she saw how South Koreans actually lived, Choi said, "she began to realize that what she had been told while living in the North was totally untrue." Kim then "threw herself into the arms of a female investigator" and confessed to the bombing. In Korean, she said, "Forgive me. I am sorry. I will tell you everything," and said that she had been "exploited as a tool for North Korean terrorist activities", and made a detailed and voluntary confession.

Workers and businessmen alike, government officials and diplomats, all stake their lives on the wings of civil airliners ... Therefore, any State-directed terrorist threat ... is naturally fraught with dangers for world stability and peace.

— Choi Young-jin, representing South Korea, speaking at the United Nations Security Council inquest into the attacks

The escape route, she said, was to be from Abu Dhabi via Amman to Rome, but the pair were diverted to Bahrain due to visa complications. She added that she had been travelling undercover for three years, preparing for the attack. Kim told investigators that when she was sixteen, she was chosen by the Workers' Party of Korea and trained in a number of languages. Three years later, she was educated at a secret and elite espionage school run by the North Korean Army, where she was trained to kill with her hands and feet and to use rifles and grenades. Training at the school involved enduring several years of gruelling physical and psychological conditioning. In 1987, aged 25, Kim was ordered to detonate a bomb aboard a South Korean jetliner, an attack that she was told would reunify her divided country forever.

In January 1988, Kim announced at a press conference held by the Agency for National Security Planning, the South Korean secret services agency, that both she and her partner were North Korean operatives. She said that they had left a radio containing 350 grams of C-4 explosive and a liquor bottle containing approximately 700 ml of PLX explosive, with a timer set to go off for nine hours after departure from Baghdad, in an overhead rack in the passenger cabin of the aircraft. Kim expressed remorse for her actions and asked for the forgiveness of the families of those who had died. She also said that the order for the bombing had been "personally penned" by Kim Jong Il, the son of North Korean supreme leader Kim Il Sung, who had wanted to destabilize the South Korean government, disrupt its upcoming 1988 parliamentary elections, and frighten international teams from attending the 1988 Summer Olympics in Seoul later that year. "It is natural that I should be punished and killed a hundred times for my sin," she said. Writing in The Washington Post on 15 January 1988, journalist Peter Maass stated that it was not clear to him if Kim was coerced in her remarks or was motivated by remorse for her actions. Kim was subsequently sentenced to execution for the bombing of KAL 858, but she was later pardoned by the President of South Korea, Roh Tae-woo. "The persons who ought to be on trial here are the leaders of North Korea," he said. "This child is as much a victim of this evil regime as the passengers aboard KAL 858."

=== Possible discovery of aircraft wreckage ===
In January 2020, a South Korean television news team from Munhwa Broadcasting Corporation reported that they may have found the main wreckage at a depth of 52 metres (170 ft) under the Andaman Sea. Tipped off by local fishing crews, they conducted sonar scans which found a wing-shaped object 10 metres (33 ft) long and a 27 metres (90 ft) long section believed to be fuselage. Grainy images from underwater cameras were shown on South Korean TV and, although there was no official confirmation that this was KAL 858 or its location, some families of the victims held a news conference demanding the fuselage be salvaged.

== Aftermath ==
=== North Korea ===
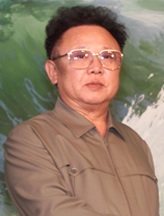
Kim Hyon-hui's testimony implicated Kim Jong Il, the son of North Korean supreme leader Kim Il Sung, to be ultimately responsible for the bombing

The United States State Department specifically refers to the bombing of KAL 858 as a "terrorist act" and, except between 2008 and 2017, has included North Korea on its State Sponsors of Terrorism list based on the results of the South Korean investigation. Charles E. Redman, Assistant Secretary of State for Public Affairs, said in January 1988 that the incident was an "act of mass murder," adding that the administration had "concluded that the evidence of North Korean culpability is compelling. We call on all nations to condemn North Korea for this terrorist act." The action was discussed at length in at least two United Nations Security Council meetings, where the allegations and evidence was aired by all sides, but no resolution was passed. North Korea continues to deny involvement in the attack on KAL 858, saying that the incident was a "fabrication" by South Korea and other countries.

Kim Jong Il became the leader of North Korea in 1994, succeeding his father. In 2001, right-wing activists and relatives of the victims killed in the attack demanded that Kim Jong Il be arrested for terrorism offences when he visited Seoul later in the year. Two petitions were filed against him, with the activists and relatives stating that there was strong evidence—namely Kim's testimony—to suggest he was ultimately responsible for the bombing. They also called for him to make a public apology for the incident and formally compensate the victims' families. The leader of a right-wing South Korean group, lawyer Lee Chul-sung, said, "Kim Jong Il must be arrested and punished if he comes to Seoul without admitting his criminal acts and offering an apology and compensation." Kim Jong Il was not arrested, however. He died in December 2011, and was succeeded by his son, Kim Jong Un.

=== Kim Hyon-hui ===
I am guilty of a heinous crime. How do I dare to think of marriage? Being a culprit, I do have a sense of agony with which I must fight. In that sense, I must still be a prisoner or a captive—of a sense of guilt.

— Kim Hyon-hui, asked about marriage

In 1993, William Morrow and Company published The Tears of My Soul, Kim's account of how she was trained as a North Korean espionage agent and carried out the bombing of KAL 858. As a gesture of contrition for her crime, she donated all of the proceeds from this book to the families of the victims of KAL 858. The book details her early training and life in China, Macao, and across Europe, carrying out the bombing, her consequent trial, reprieve, and integration into South Korea. In the book, Kim states that Kim Jong Il masterminded the bombing, and gave the order to carry out the attack. It is also believed that Kim Jong Il masterminded the Rangoon bombing of 1983, in which North Korea attempted to assassinate South Korean president, Chun Doo-hwan. Her story has also been turned into a motion picture, Mayumi, directed by Shin Sang-ok in 1990.

In 2010, Kim Hyon-hui visited Japan, where she met the families of Japanese people abducted by North Korea during the 1970s and 1980s who were forced to teach North Korean spies to disguise themselves as Japanese—who, it was reported, may have trained Kim Hyon-hui. The Japanese government waived immigration rules in order for the visit to take place since Kim is regarded as a criminal in the country for her use of the false Japanese passport in the attack. The Japanese press, however, criticized the visit, for which security was tight over fears that she might be attacked. Kim arrived in the country on a private jet chartered by the Japanese government and was ushered into a car shielded by large umbrellas. During the visit, she stayed in a holiday home owned by Yukio Hatoyama, prime Minister of Japan. Kim today resides in an undisclosed location and remains under constant protection for fear of reprisals, from either victims' families or the North Korean government, which has described her as a traitor to their cause.

=== In South Korean politics ===
In 2007, an association of families of victims released their suspicions on the official version of the events. The Truth and Reconciliation Commission investigated the matter and found out that the bombing was "not a manipulation" by the South Korean National Intelligence Service (NIS). In 2016, Kim Kwang-jin, a member of the National Assembly raised the suspicion that the bombing was done by the NIS during the unsuccessful filibuster of the anti-terrorism bill.

=== Continuing tension ===
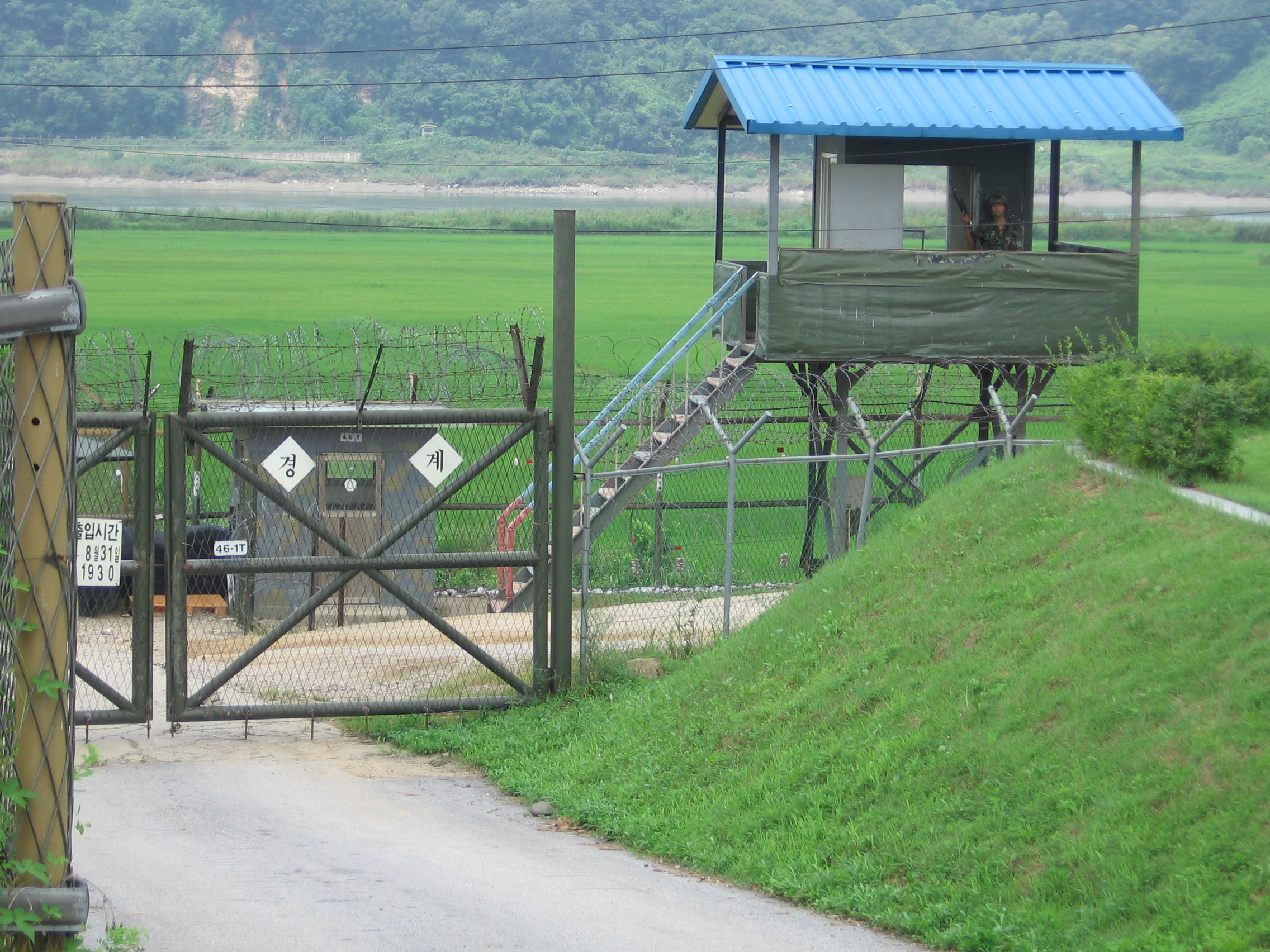
A South Korean checkpoint at the Korean Demilitarized Zone in August 2005. Tension between North Korea and South Korea has not improved since the signing of the Korean War armistice in 1953.

The tension between North Korea and South Korea has not subsided since the signing of the armistice in 1953, and no formal peace treaty permanently ending the conflict has been signed. In 2000, however, both countries held the first Inter-Korean summit, in which the leaders of both countries signed a joint declaration, stating that they would hold a second summit, in 2007. Furthermore, both countries were involved in military and ministerial discussions in Pyongyang, Seoul and Jeju Island in that year. On 2 October 2007, South Korean president, Roh Moo-hyun, walked across the Korean Demilitarized Zone in travelling to Pyongyang for talks with Kim Jong Il. Both leaders reaffirmed the spirit of the 2000 joint declaration and had discussions on various issues related to realizing the advancement of south–north relations, peace on the Korean Peninsula, common prosperity of the Korean people, and the reunification of Korea. On 4 October 2007, South Korean president, Roh Moo-hyun, and North Korean leader, Kim Jong Il, signed the peace declaration. The document called for international talks to replace the 1953 armistice, which ended most active hostilities but did not formally end the Korean War, with a permanent peace treaty.

== In popular culture ==
A movie titled Mayumi was released in 1990, focusing on the bombing and its aftermath mostly from Kim Hyon-Hui's perspective.

The bombing of Korean Air Flight 858 was covered in 2020 in "What Caused The 1987 Korean Air Flight 858 Explosion? | One Day That Changed Asia", a documentary by CNA Insider.

== See also ==
External images
- Photograph of HL7406 prior to the bombing
- Image of Kim Hyon Hui, one of the two North Korean agents responsible for planting the bomb, in 2009
- Panasonic transistor radio c. 1987, likely similar to the model used to conceal the bomb

- 1987 in aviation
- Aftermath of the Korean War
- Gimpo International Airport bombing
- List of terrorist incidents in 1987
- Timeline of airliner bombing attacks

=== North Korea ===
- Foreign relations of North Korea
- Liberty in North Korea
- North Korea and weapons of mass destruction
- Politics of North Korea

=== Similar incidents ===
- Middle East Airlines Flight 438
- Air India Flight 182
- Pan Am Flight 103
- Philippine Airlines Flight 434
- China Airlines Flight 825
- Metrojet Flight 9268
