= Kim Hyon-hui =

South Korean citizen and former North Korean agent (born 1962)

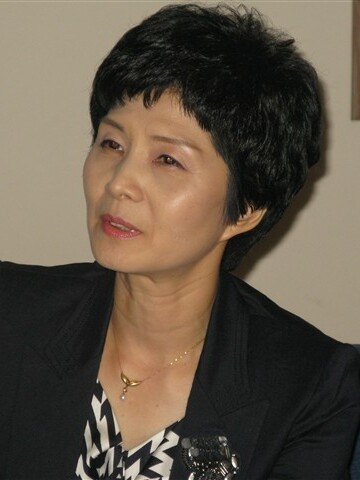
- Kim Hyon-hui in 2010
- Born: 27 January 1962 (age 64); Kaesong, North Korea
- Other names: Kim Okhwa, Mayumi Hachiya, Kim Hyun Hee
- Known for: Bombing of Korean Air Flight 858
- Notable work: The Tears of My Soul
- Children: 2
- Status: Pardoned
- Conviction: Murder (115 counts)
- Penalty: Death
- Accomplice: Kim Seung-il

Details
- Date: 29 November 1987
- Locations: Near Moscos Islands, Andaman Sea
- Target: Korean Air Flight 858
- Killed: 115
- Weapon: IED

- Kim Hyon-hui
- Hangul: 김현희
- Hanja: 金賢姬
- RR: Gim Hyeonhui
- MR: Kim Hyŏnhŭi

Japanese cover name

Mayumi Hachiya
- Kanji: 蜂谷 真由美
Transcriptions
- Romanization: Hachiya Mayumi

Kim Hyon-hui (Korean: 김현희, born 27 January 1962), also known as Okhwa, is a South Korean citizen, former North Korean agent and mass murderer, responsible for the Korean Air Flight 858 bombing in 1987, which killed 115 people. She was arrested in Bahrain following the bombing and extradited to South Korea, where she was sentenced to death but later pardoned shortly after being convicted and sentenced.

After leaving North Korea, Kim has publicly expressed regret about the bombing and has since provided information about the state of affairs in North Korea, as well as the possible state of abductees.

== Early life ==
Kim, the eldest child of two girls and two boys, was born in Kaesong on 27 January 1962, but her family later settled in the country's capital, Pyongyang. Her father was a career diplomat and, as a result, she and her family lived in Cuba for five years. Kim excelled as a student and in after-school activities.

She was originally trained as an actress, starring in North Korea's first Technicolor film, though her father, disapproving of her being an actress, refused to let her act again after her appearing in two films. In 1972, Kim was selected to present flowers to the senior South Korean delegate at the north–south talks in Pyongyang. After graduating from high school, she initially enrolled at Kim Il Sung University to study biology, before transferring to the Pyongyang University of Foreign Studies, where she studied Japanese. However, she had barely begun her studies there when she was recruited for work.

== Espionage training ==
Soon after joining the North Korean intelligence agency in 1980, Kim was given a new name, Ok Hwa, and sent to live in a compound outside of Pyongyang. The compound was mentioned by Kim as "Keumsung Military College", yet the name wasn't mentioned by anyone else before or since. There, Kim spent seven years learning spycraft. Her training included martial arts, physical fitness, and three years of Japanese. Kim's Japanese instructor was Yaeko Taguchi, one of many Japanese people kidnapped by North Korea. Later, Kim testified that Taguchi was known to her as Lee Un-hae (李恩惠, 리은혜). Additionally, students at this facility were shown propaganda films. At the end of her training, Kim was rigorously tested. Part of her final exam required her to infiltrate and memorise a document from a mock embassy.

She was sent to Macau to learn Cantonese, so that she would be able to pose as Chinese when sent on overseas missions. They were also trained to shop in supermarkets, use credit cards and visit disco clubs, amenities that did not exist in their homeland.

Kim was then allowed to travel through Europe with an older man, known to her as Kim Seung-il (金勝一). This was part of her extensive preparation to complete a mission that was of great importance to the ruling Kim family. In 1984, they flew first from Pyongyang to Moscow, from where they travelled to Budapest, where they were given fake Japanese passports and identities, and began posing as a father and daughter touring Europe together. Then, they visited Vienna, Copenhagen, Frankfurt, Zurich, Geneva and Paris before going separate ways, the younger Kim returning to Pyongyang via Macau, Guangzhou and Beijing and the older Kim going to Seoul to complete a separate mission. There, the older Kim's contact was discovered by South Korean agents and police, and, according to the younger Kim, the older Kim barely managed to escape South Korea with his life.

== Korean Air Flight 858 ==
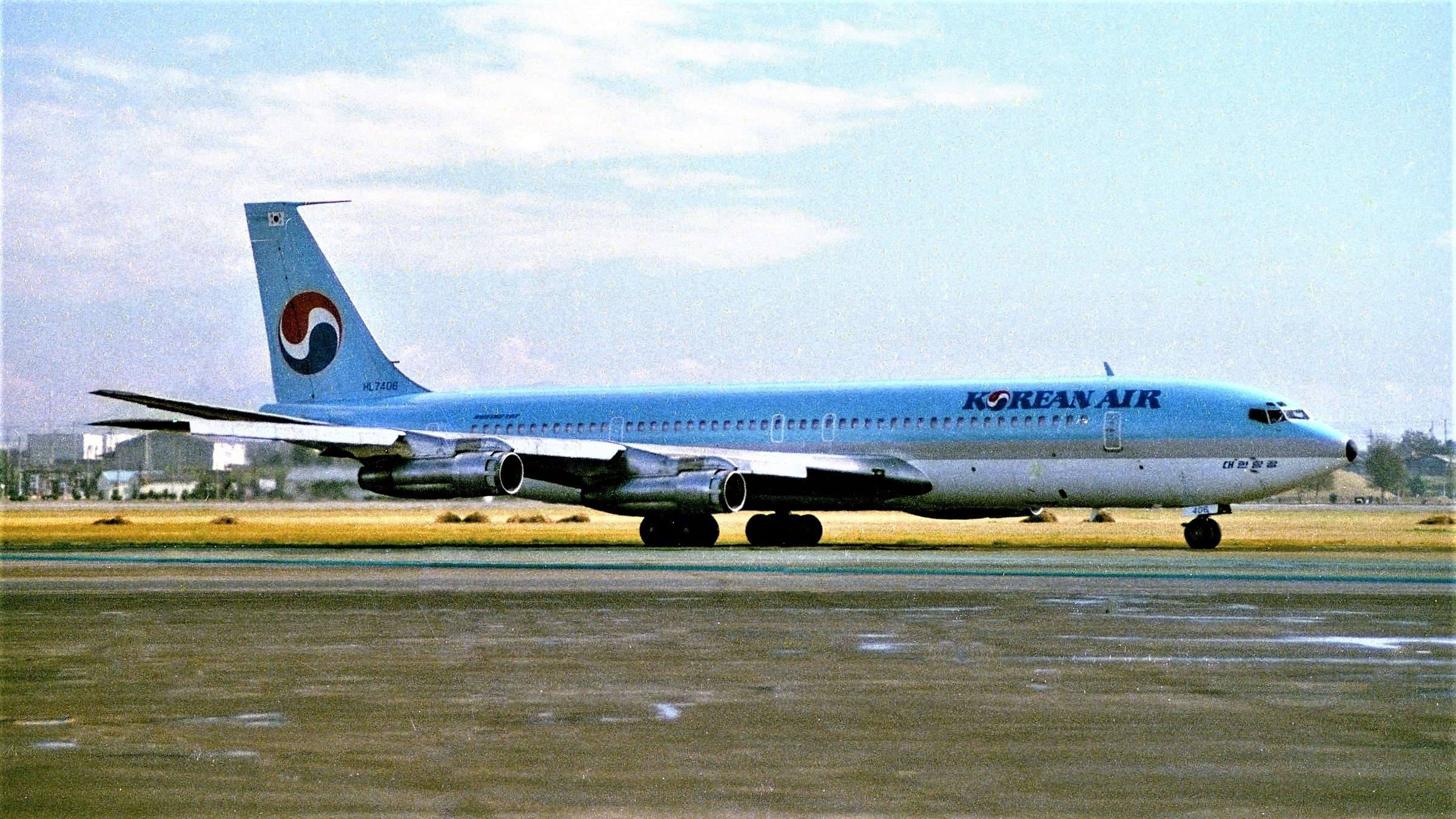
The aircraft destroyed in Flight 858 at Nagoya Airport one month before the bombing

In 1987, Kim was given an assignment to plant bombs on KAL 858. She was told that the order came directly from Kim Jong Il, and was handwritten. She was told that if she were successful, she would be able to return and live with her family and would not have to work as an agent afterward. She was once again paired with Kim Seung-il, who was recovering from a stomach operation.

She was travelling with a fake Japanese passport under the name of Mayumi Hachiya (蜂谷 真由美, Hachiya Mayumi) along with Kim Seung-il, who posed as her father and used the name Shinichi Hachiya (蜂谷 真一, Hachiya Shin'ichi). The two travelled through Moscow, Budapest and Vienna, and eventually met other North Korean agents in Belgrade who provided them with the materials to complete their mission. Once they had left the timer bomb behind (disguised as a portable Panasonic radio, amplified by liquid explosives in a liquor bottle) in the luggage rack of KAL 858, Kim Hyon-hui and Kim Seung-il disembarked in Abu Dhabi and travelled to Bahrain. The two terrorists were apprehended in Bahrain after the authorities there became suspicious of their travel movements and investigators discovered that their passports were fake. Kim Seung-il bit a cyanide pill that was hidden in a cigarette and died. Kim Hyon-hui attempted to do the same, but a Bahraini police officer snatched the cigarette out of her mouth before she could fully ingest the poison. She was hospitalised and then later interrogated.

After Bahraini authorities were convinced she was actually a North Korean, she was flown to Seoul, South Korea under heavy guard, bound and gagged. At first, she insisted that her name was Pai Chui Hui, an orphan from northern China, who had met an elderly Japanese man with whom she was travelling. She denied any sexual involvement with her partner Kim Seung-il. However, the fact that the only form of Chinese that she spoke, Cantonese, is only spoken in southern China, was inconsistent with her claimed northern Chinese origin.

According to testimony at a United Nations Security Council meeting, Kim was taken on several occasions outside of her prison cell to see the prosperity of Seoul. The prison authorities also showed her TV shows and news reports showing the affluent lifestyle of South Koreans and the freedom for South Koreans to speak dissent and criticise their government. In North Korea, she had been taught that South Korea was a corruption-riddled fiefdom of the United States and that poverty was widespread.

After eight days, Kim broke down, admitted that she was in fact a North Korean and confessed the details of her role in the bombing of Flight 858, as well as Kim Il Sung's personal involvement in the scheme.

== Aftermath ==
For her role in the bombing of KAL 858, Kim was sentenced to death in March 1989. However, South Korean president Roh Tae-woo pardoned her later that year, saying that she was merely a brainwashed victim of the real culprit, the North Korean government. Although Kim was given an option to return to North Korea, she opted to stay in the South and defected.

She later wrote an autobiography titled The Tears of My Soul, and donated the proceeds to the families of the victims of Flight 858, writing the autobiography under the South Korean-style spelling of her name, Kim Hyun Hee.

Publishers Weekly, in its 1992 review of the book Shoot the Women First by Eileen MacDonald, described Kim as "robot-like" and "wholly submissive to male authority".

In an interview with Washington Post correspondent Don Oberdorfer, Kim said that she'd been led to believe the bombing was necessary to aid the cause of reuniting the peninsula. She repeated this on a 2018 National Geographic documentary about the Kim family. However, the sight of Seoul's prosperity made her realise she'd "committed the crime of killing compatriots."

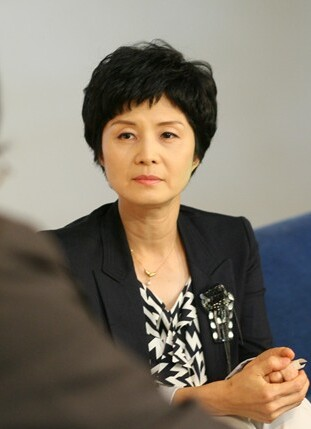
Kim Hyon-hui in 2010

In March 2009, when meeting family members of Yaeko Taguchi, she mentioned that Taguchi may still be alive, and in connection with this she visited Japan in July 2010. After the 2011 Tōhoku earthquake and tsunami in Japan, she donated ¥1,000,000 (equivalent to about ¥1,150,000 in 2024) to the victims, out of gratitude for the preferential treatment she had received in Japan during her previous visit. She was also featured by a Japanese television documentary that dramatised her life and revealed how Taguchi used to sing lullabies to her children, from whom she had been separated after being abducted.

Kim has also offered analysis to news organisations about current affairs in North Korea. During the 2013 Korean crisis, Kim suggested on Australian television that North Korean leader Kim Jong Un was too young and inexperienced, was "struggling to gain complete control over the military and to win their loyalty." She also commented that he was "using the nuclear programme as a bargaining chip for aid, to keep the public behind him."

In an interview with Mainichi Shimbun in February 2017, Kim argued that the assassination of Kim Jong-nam was a murder by hiring two Southeast Asian women, not by trained spies, and this was intended to make the victim let down his guard.

In an interview with BBC, Kim said that North Korea just pretended to be friendly on the issue of the 2018 Winter Olympics, and its priority still is the nuclear programme.

North Korea denies that Kim was born in the North, and regards her entire biography to be a fabrication of the South. Some North Korean-run schools in Japan have falsely claimed that Kim was a South Korean agent.

== Personal life ==
Kim married a former South Korean agent handling her case in 1997 and has two children. Kim currently lives in an undisclosed location in South Korea, and remains under constant protection for fear of reprisals from the North Korean government. According to a BBC interview in 2013, her family left behind in North Korea were arrested and sent to a labour camp.

Kim converted to Baptist Christianity.

== Works ==
- Kim, Hyun Hee. The Tears of My Soul. William Morrow & Co, 1993, ISBN 978-0-688-12833-3

== See also ==
- Mayumi
- North Korea's illicit activities
