= National Association for the Rescue of Japanese Kidnapped by North Korea =

Japanese organization

The National Association for the Rescue of Japanese Kidnapped by North Korea or NARKN (北朝鮮に拉致された日本人を救出するための全国協議会 or simply 救う会全国協議会) was established in 1998. The purpose of NARKN is to help the families of Japanese victims kidnapped by North Korea, who campaign for the return of their loved ones in North Korea between the 1970s and 1980s.

The chairman of NARKN is Tsutomu Nishioka, a professor of Tokyo Christian University.

== People ==
- Yokota family
  - Sakie and Shiguru Yokota (parents of Megumi Yokota)
  - Takyua and Tatsuya Yokota (brothers of Megumi Yokota)
- Shingo Izuka (brother of Yaeko Taguchi)
