= Tsutomu Nishioka =

Japanese academic

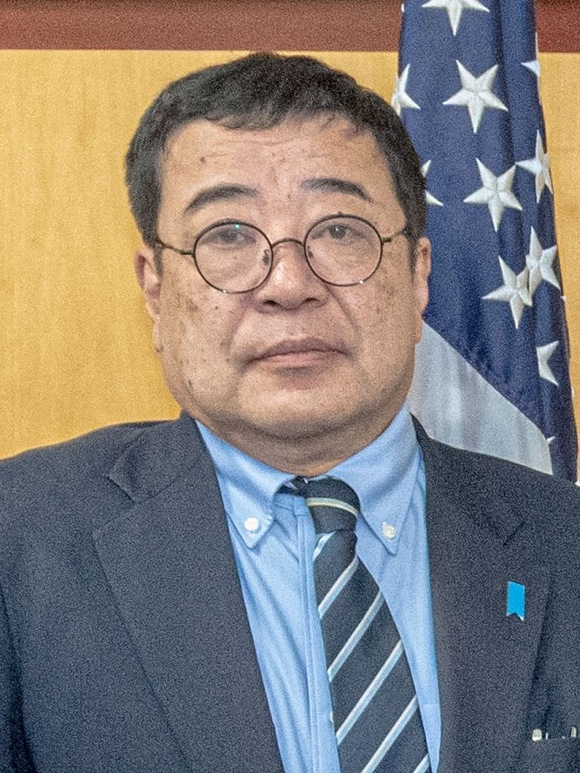
Tsutomu Nishioka in Washington, D.C. on 3 May 2023

Tsutomu Nishioka (西岡 力, Nishioka Tsutomu, born 1956 in Tokyo) is a professor of International Christian Studies at Tokyo Christian University. He specializes in Japan-Korean relations, South Korea/North Korea Studies. His research focuses on the Comfort women and the North Korean abductions of Japanese citizens. He is a chairman of the National Association for the Rescue of Japanese Kidnapped by North Korea (NARKN).

== Academic career ==
He graduated from Tokyo Christian University in 1979 and earned a master's degree in International Area Studies from the graduate school of University of Tsukuba in 1983. He studied at the International Division in Yonsei University from 1977 to 1978. He worked at the Embassy of Japan in South Korea as a special researcher for the Ministry of Foreign Affairs from 1982 to 1984. He was an Editor in Chief of the Gendai Korea (Today's Korea) journal from 1990 to 2002.

In 2016, he started working as a guest professor for Reitaku University.

== Works ==
=== Publications ===
- Nikkan Gokai No Shin’en (日韓誤解の深淵, The Abyss of Japan-South Korean Misunderstanding), Akishobo, (1992) ISBN 4750592129
- Koria Tabū O Toku (コリア・タブーを解く, Solving the Korea Taboo), Akishobo, (1997) ISBN 4750597031
- Yami Ni Idomu: Rachi, Kiga, Ianfu, Han-Nichi O Dō Haaku Suru Ka (闇に挑む!―拉致、飢餓、慰安婦、反日をどう把握するか, Deciphering the Darkness: Abductions, Starvation, Comfort Women and the Anti-Japan Movement), Tokuma Shoten, (1998) ISBN 4198909709
- Boso suru kokka, Kita-Chosen (暴走する国家・北朝鮮――核ミサイルは防げるのか), Tokuma Shoten, (1999) ISBN 4198911444
- Kin Sei-nichi ga shikaketa "Tainichi daiboryaku" Rachi no Shinjitu (金正日が仕掛けた「対日大謀略」拉致の真実), Tokuma Shoten, (2002) ISBN 4198615977
- KinSei-nichi to Kin Dai-chu (金正日と金大中――南北融和に騙されるな!), PHP Institute, (2000) ISBN 4569612687
- Tero kokka, Kita-Chosen ni damasareruna (テロ国家・北朝鮮に騙されるな, PHP Institute, (2002) ISBN 4569624413
- Kita-Chosen ni torikomareru Kankoku (北朝鮮に取り込まれる韓国――いま"隣国"で何が起こっているか), PHP Institute, (2004) ISBN 4569634680
- Nikkan “Rekishi Mondai” no Shinjitsu (日韓「歴史問題」の真実――「朝鮮人強制連行」「慰安婦問題」を捏造したのは誰か. The Truth About the Japan-South Korea History Issue), PHP Institute, (2005) ISBN 4569643167
- Kita-Chosen no "Kaku", "Rachi" ha kaiketsudekiru (北朝鮮の「核」「拉致」は解決できる), PHP Institute, (2006) ISBN 4569656315
- Rachi kazoku tono rokunen senso (拉致家族との6年戦争――敵は日本にもいた!), Fusosha Publishing, (2002) ISBN 4594038190
- Kankoku bunretsu (韓国分裂――親北左派vs韓米日同盟派の戦い), Fusosha Publishing, (2005) ISBN 4594050166
- Kiga to misairu (飢餓とミサイル――北朝鮮はこれからどうなるのか), Sōshisha, (1998) ISBN 479420857X
- Yoku Wakaru Ianfu Mondai (よくわかる慰安婦問題, Comfort-women Problem, You Understand Well.), Sōshisha Publishing, (2007) ISBN 9784794216014
  Yoku Wakaru Ianfu Mondai :Zōho Shimpan (文庫よくわかる慰安婦問題増補新版, Comfort-women Problem, You Understand Well., Revised Edition), Sōshisha Publishing, (2012) ISBN 4794219423
- Asahi shinbun "Nihonjin eno taizai" "Ianfu netsuzou houdou" tettei tsuikyuu (朝日新聞「日本人への大罪」 「慰安婦捏造報道」徹底追及), Goku books, (2014) ISBN 978-4908117022
- Yokota Megumi-san wo torimodosunoha imashikanai (横田めぐみさんたちを取り戻すのは今しかない), PHP Institute, (2015) ISBN 978-4569824277
- Yusuri, takari-no kokka (ゆすり、たかりの国家), Wac, (2017) ISBN 978-4898317631
- Rekishi wo netsuzosuru hannichi kokka - Kankoku (歴史を捏造する反日国家・韓国), Wac, (2019) ISBN 978-4-89831-792-1
- Dechiage no chhoyokō mondai (でっちあげの徴用工問題), Sōshisha Publishing, (2019) ISBN 978-4-7942-2388-3

=== Web articles ===
- Tsutomu Nishioka (October 26, 2020). "Dissolve SCJ and Normalize Academia in Japan". Japan Forward.
- Tsutomu Nishioka (December 26, 2020). "Today's South Korea Not Qualified to Be Invited to G7 Summit". Center for Security Policy. Archived from the original on January 22, 2021.
- Tsutomu Nishioka (January 19, 2021). "Unjust South Korean Court Ruling on Comfort Women". Japan Forward.
- Tsutomu Nishioka (January 27, 2021). "Behind the Demotion of North Korean Dictator's Sister". Japan Forward.
- Tsutomu Nishioka (March 19, 2021). "New Trends in Fighting Lies in the Comfort Women Issue". Japan Forward.

== Lawsuit ==
He was accused of defamation on January 9, 2015, by a former Asahi Shimbun reporter Takashi Uemura who wrote a series of articles on the comfort women issue, the first of which in 1991. Nishioka accused Uemura of "fabricating" his stories on comfort women. Takashi Uemura demanded that Bungeishunju Ltd. and Tsutomu Nishioka pay ¥27.5 million in damages and issue apologies. The Tokyo District Court in 2019 rejected his claims for damages, the ruling determined that Nishioka's claims about two articles written by Uemura “did not deviate from the scope of regular reviews.”.

Uemura appealed to the Supreme Court in Tokyo, which issued its ruling on the case on March 11, 2021, rejecting Uemura's appeal. The court concluded that: “An important part of the articles and claims [of fabrication] moved by Mr. Nishioka were based on the truth.”
