= Nishi-Arai Incident =

The Nishi-Arai Incident (Japanese: 西新井事件, Nishi-Arai jiken) was a North Korean espionage case that came to light in Japan in 1985. The case involved agents from the Workers' Party of Korea's External Information and Investigation Department, who illegally entered Japan and, with the cooperation of collaborators known as todai-jin, assumed the identities of Japanese citizens for more than a decade. The agents engaged in passport fraud and participated in abductions of Japanese citizens by North Korea. The incident is regarded as one of the most significant spy cases in Japan's postwar history, and it has prompted calls from abductees' families for the enactment of an anti-espionage law.

== Overview of the Incident ==
The principal agent in this case, known by the alias "Pak" (real name: Choi Seung-chol), illegally entered Japan in August 1970 via Hane Coast in the Noto Peninsula, Ishikawa Prefecture (Noto Town). After his arrival, he recruited a Japan-resident Korean living in Osaka, Eguchi Satoshi (real name: Kim Seok-du), as a todai-jin (a collaborator who provides support or a base of operations for North Korean agents). Pak then settled in Nishi-Arai, Adachi Ward, Tokyo, assumed the false identity of "Tadao Matsuda," and began working at a rubber manufacturing company in the city.He subsequently persuaded Kim Seok-du to relocate with his family to Nishi-Arai.

Pak worked at the rubber factory for about a year. During this time, he approached a 38-year-old female colleague, a widow raising three children while working part-time, and soon began a romantic relationship with her. A few months later, he started living with her.

Having integrated himself into the single-mother household, Pak organized "family trips" to coastal areas along the Sea of Japan, Atami, and the shores of Shikoku and Kyushu, photographing and filming coastlines on each visit.

In July 1972, Pak met O, a 34-year-old Japanese man from Fukushima Prefecture, in the San'ya district of Tokyo. O was in a near-collapsed state and in poor health. Pak approached him under the guise of offering care and arranged for his immediate hospitalization. By the tenth day of O's stay, O—grateful for the kindness—fully trusted Pak. Pretending to be the president of a shipping company, Pak told O that he would hire him upon discharge and offered to pay all hospitalization costs if O accepted. O consented. Together with Kim Seok-du, Pak then visited O's family home, again posing as a company president, and persuaded O's parents to transfer O's family register from Fukushima to Tokyo, claiming it would be more convenient.

Pak then assumed O's identity, fraudulently obtaining a Japanese passport and driver's license under O's name. Until O's death in July 1976, Pak traveled abroad three times under O's identity, visiting Japan, Frankfurt, Paris, Hong Kong, and Seoul, working to expand a spy network spanning Japan and South Korea. In May 1974, Pak arranged for Kim Seok-du to be smuggled out of Noto Town, Fugeshi District, Ishikawa Prefecture, to North Korea, where Kim underwent six months of spy training before being sent back to Japan to handle fundraising and recruit additional operatives. In December of that year, fearing discovery, Pak ordered Kim to abduct O and bring him to North Korea. However, according to later testimony, Kim abandoned the plan when O died of illness in July 1976.

On July 31, 1978, Pak (Choi Seung-chol), together with Han Kum-ryong and Kim Nam-jin, abducted Kaoru Hasuike and Yukiko Okudo, a couple in Kashiwazaki, Niigata Prefecture, taking them to North Korea (the "Niigata Abduction of a Couple").

Pak later assumed the identity of K, a 41-year-old man from Hokkaido. Around 1980, he arranged to have K's family register transferred to Tokyo, then fraudulently obtained a passport and driver's license in K's name. Suspicious of the family register transfer, K's relatives called him. However, Pak, posing as K's housemate, answered the phone with excuses such as "he went out to play mahjong," repeating this several times. During this period, Pak established a trading company and traveled abroad six times using K's passport, visiting Southeast Asia and Europe. The real K had been listed as missing since 1961, and his whereabouts remain unknown. According to analyst Jeon Bu-ok, based on the methods of North Korean spy agencies, it is highly likely that K was either abducted to North Korea or murdered. Pak continued espionage activities until he apparently departed Japan for Malaysia on February 4, 1983.

On March 1, 1985, the Public Security Division II of the Tokyo Metropolitan Police Department arrested Japan-resident Korean Kim Seok-du (aged 49 at the time), exposing the case. Pak (Choi Seung-chol), however, has never been arrested, and his current whereabouts remain unknown.

== Espionage and abductions in Japan ==
One of the North Korean auxiliary agents of Korean descent in Japan believed to have been involved in the case was Ri Kyong-u. He is considered to have assisted in the production of a forged passport for Kim Seung-il, the male agent who committed suicide during the Korean Air Flight 858 bombing. Ri was one of the perpetrators of the abduction of Kaoru Hasuike and Yukiko Okudo, and was deeply involved in the abductions of Japanese citizens. Testimonies from returnees indicated that Ri had frequently met with the victims prior to the abductions.
