= Megumi (manga) =

Japanese manga series

めぐみ
- Genre: Drama, Biography, Historical, Crime
- Manga
- Written by: Souichi Moto; Sakie Yokota; Shigeru Yokota
- Published by: Futabasha
- Magazine: Weekly Manga Action
- Original run: December 2004 – July 2005
- Volumes: 2
- Original net animation
- Directed by: Hidetoshi Ōmori
- Produced by: Hajime Hashimoto; Kōji Tsunematsu; Shigeyuki Koresawa
- Written by: Hideki Mitsui
- Studio: Trans Arts
- Released: 2008
- Related works
- Dakkan

Megumi (めぐみ) is a manga based on the life of Megumi Yokota, a Japanese girl who was abducted when she was 13 years old by North Korean spies in 1977. The manga concept was conceived by her mother and father and was penned by Souichi Moto under their supervision.

== Plot ==
The manga follows Megumi's final days in her home town before her abduction.

== Anime ==
As of 2008, the Government of Japan announced an anime adaptation will be created from the manga. The anime is dubbed in Japanese, Korean, Chinese, English and Russian. In addition, there are Japanese dubbed versions with subtitles in French, German, Italian, and Spanish. The government authorized a free downloadable version, as well as a DVD release.

=== Cast ===
All Japanese cast members were asked by Kouichi Yamadera for participation through the Japan Actors Union (Nippairen). Yamadera said, "The abduction is an act of disregarding human rights, not accepted. We Japanese people should emphasize our anger."

Megumi cast
Role	Japanese	English	Korean	Mandarin	Russian
Narrator	Michio Hazama	Walter Roberts	Kyong-wan Park	Zhongling Qi	Grigory Apukhtin
Megumi Yokota	Minami Takayama	Soness Stevens	Dal-rae Jin	Liang Li	Marina Artyushenko
Shigeru Yokota	Kouichi Yamadera	Walter Roberts	Kyong-wan Park	Zhongling Qi	Grigory Apukhtin
Sakie Yokota	Rika Fukami	Sally Koshinaka	Mi-sung Lee	Zhenlin Piao	Marina Belova
Takuya Yokota (child)	Megumi Tano	Stacy Powell	Eui-jung Kim	Xiangning Li	Anastasia Boldyreva
Takuya Yokota (adult)	Bin Shimada	David Schaufele	Kui-uk Cheon	Wanzhou Wang	Fedor Solntsev
Tetsuya Yokota		Thomas Melesky			
Colleague	Shin-ichiro Miki	David Schaufele	Sung-hee Chang	Yuxing Chang	Anatoly Krasnov
Nurse	Yumiko Akaike	Stacy Powell	Eui-jung Kim	Gyomei Ri	Anastasia Boldyreva
Clerk	Masahito Kawanago	David Schaufele	Sung-hee Chang	Gyosei Jo	Anatoly Krasnov
Administration official	Aruno Tahara	David Schaufele	Sung-hee Chang	Gyosei Jo	Anatoly Krasnov
Tsubo	Junko Shimakata	Stacy Powell	Eui-jung Kim	Gyomei Ri	Anastasia Boldyreva

== See also ==
- North Korea Kidnapped My Daughter
- Abduction: The Megumi Yokota Story
- North Korean abductions of Japanese citizens
