= Chris Sheridan (director) =

Canadian filmmaker

Chris Sheridan is a Canadian filmmaker and co-founder, with wife Patty Kim, of Safari Media. With his wife he co-directed the 2006 documentary Abduction: The Megumi Yokota Story and the 2004 documentary Destiny, which won a top award at the New York International Independent Video and Film Festival. He now lives and works in Washington, D.C., USA with his wife.
