= Abduction: The Megumi Yokota Story =

2006 American documentary

- Directed by: Patty Kim; Chris Sheridan
- Written by: Patty Kim; Chris Sheridan
- Produced by: Jane Campion; Patty Kim; Chris Sheridan
- Starring: Shigeru Yokota; Sakie Yokota; Teruaki Masumoto
- Music by: Shoji Kameda
- Production company: Safari Media
- Distributed by: Sagewood Cinema Ventures
- Release date: January 2006 (Slamdance)
- Running time: 85 minutes
- Countries: Japan; United States
- Language: English

Abduction: The Megumi Yokota Story is an American documentary about Megumi Yokota, a Japanese student who was abducted by a North Korean agent in 1977.

The film made its world premiere at the 2006 Slamdance Film Festival and has won numerous awards. It was made by Canadian journalists Chris Sheridan and Patty Kim made and released in 37 theaters in Tokyo and 17 other prefectures, including Hokkaido, Kanagawa, Osaka, Hiroshima and Fukuoka. It was also released in theaters in the United States, opening on August 18, 2006, at the Hollywood Arc Light Cinema in Los Angeles.

Among its honors, this film was named best documentary at the San Francisco International Asian American Film Festival, the Austin Film Festival, the Asian Film Festival of Dallas and won the audience award at the Omaha and Slamdance Film Festivals in 2006. The film has been shown at some of the largest festivals all over the world including the Sydney Film Festival in Australia, the International Documentary Festival of Amsterdam in The Netherlands and the Hot Docs Film Festival in Canada. In January 2009, the film was honored with the prestigious Alfred I. duPont Award, one of the highest distinctions in American journalism.

The film has also been broadcast on TV, and featured in theaters in Hong Kong, Canada, Belgium, Denmark, the United Kingdom, Israel, France, Australia, Germany, Switzerland, France, Singapore and many others.

== Premise ==
The documentary is told from the eyes of Megumi's mother and father as they spend nearly thirty years searching for the grave truth about their daughter's abduction.

== Awards ==
At a ceremony at Columbia University in New York on January 22, 2009, the filmmakers were awarded the Alfred I. duPont Silver Baton, one of the highest distinctions in American journalism.

- Best Documentary, Audience Award: 2006 Slamdance Film Festival
- Best Documentary, Audience Award: 2006 Omaha Film Festival
- Jury Prize, Best Documentary: 2006 San Francisco International Asian American Film Festival
- Top Ten Audience Favorite: 2006 Hot Docs
- Best Documentary: 2006 Asian Film Festival of Dallas
- Best Documentary: 2006 Austin Film Festival
- Top Five Audience Favorite: 2006 Sydney Film Festival
- Nominee, Best Feature Documentary, United Nations International Film Festival on Human Rights 2007
- Nominee, Best Feature Documentary: 2006 Atlanta Film Festival
- Nominee, Best Feature Documentary: 2006 Starz Denver Film Festival
- Nominee, Best Feature Documentary: 2006 Independent Film Festival of Boston
- Official Selection: 2006 IDA Docuweek Theatrical Showcase
- Official Selection: 2006 International Documentary Festival of Amsterdam
- Official Selection: 2007 Docaviv International Film Festival
- Official Selection: 2007 Thessaloniki International Film Festival

== See also ==
- North Korean abductions of Japanese citizens
- Megumi Yokota
- Megumi (manga), a manga and anime adaptation of Yokota's story
