= Takashi Uemura =

Takashi Uemura may refer to:

- Takashi Uemura (footballer) a Japanese association football forward
- Takashi Uemura (academic) former journalist and lecturer
