= Souichi Moto =

Japanese manga artist

Souichi Moto (本 そういち, Moto Sōichi) is a Japanese manga artist who turned the real-life stories of North Korean kidnappings of Japanese citizens into manga. He also supervised the film Megumi, based on one of his manga.

== Works ==
- Dakkan
- Megumi
- Mugen Senkan Yamato (Fantastic Battleship Yamato)
- R (Reverse) Shitei
- When My Mother Was Kidnapped I Was One
