= Teruaki Masumoto =

Japanese activist (born 1955)

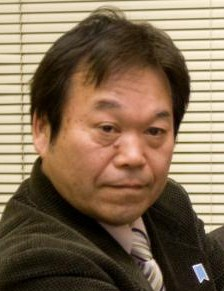
Teruaki Masumoto (2009)

Teruaki Masumoto (増元照明; born October 5, 1955, in Kagoshima Prefecture) is the secretary general of the Japanese Association of the Families of Victims Kidnapped by North Korea, which advocates for the return of Japanese citizens kidnapped by North Korea and calls for the Japanese government to impose sanctions on the country. His older sister Rumiko is one of the victims. On February 1, 2007, he married actress Yuuko Wakamiya. in May 2012 he testified at North Korean human rights in European Parliament about his sister and other abductees including Megumi Yokota and Yaeko Taguchi.

== See also ==
- North Korean abductions of Japanese
- Abduction: The Megumi Yokota Story
