= North Korean abductions of South Koreans =

An estimated 84,532 South Koreans were taken to North Korea during the Korean War. In addition, South Korean statistics estimate that, since the Korean Armistice Agreement in 1953, about 3,800 people have been abducted by North Korea, the vast majority in the late 1970s, with 489 of them reportedly still detained as of 2006.

== Terminology ==
South Korean abductees by North Korea are categorized into two groups, wartime abductees and post-war abductees.

=== Wartime abductees ===
Koreans from the south who were kidnapped to the north against their wishes during the 1950–53 Korean War and died there or are still being detained in North Korea are called wartime abductees or Korean War abductees. Most of them were already educated or skilled, such as politicians, government officials, scholars, educators, doctors, judicial officials, journalists, or businessmen. According to testimonies by remaining family members, most abductions were carried out by North Korean soldiers who had specific names and identification in hand when they showed up at people's homes. This is an indication that the abductions were carried out intentionally and in an organized manner.

=== Post-war abductees ===
South Koreans who were kidnapped by North Korean agents in the South Korean territory or foreign countries after the armistice was signed in 1953 are known as post-war abductees. Most of them were captured while fishing near the Korean Demilitarized Zone (DMZ), but some were abducted by North Korean agents in South Korea. North Korea continued to abduct South Koreans into the 2000s, as is shown by the cases of the Reverend Kim Dong-shik (Korean: 김동식), who was abducted on January 16, 2000, and Jin Gyeong-suk (Korean: 진경숙), a North Korean defector to South Korea who was abducted on August 8, 2004, when she had returned to the China-North Korea border region using her South Korean passport.

== Background ==
During wartime, North Korea kidnapped South Koreans to increase its human capacity for rehabilitation after the war. It recruited intelligentsia who were exhausted in North Korea and kidnapped those needed for post-war rehabilitation, technical specialists, and laborers. There was an intention to drain the intelligentsia of South Korean society, exacerbate societal confusion, and promote communization of South Korea by making post-war rehabilitation difficult due to the shortage of technical specialists and youth. They also had the intention to guise the abductions as voluntary entry for the advancement of their political system.

In his Complete Works, Volume IV, dated July 31, 1946, North Korean leader Kim Il Sung wrote: "In regards to bringing Southern Chosun's intelligentsia, not only do we need to search out all Northern Chosun's intelligentsia in order to solve the issue of a shortage of intelligentsia, but we also have to bring Southern Chosun's intelligentsia."

In the case of post-war abductees, Yoichi Shimada, a Fukui University professor in Japan, states that North Korea appeared to abduct foreign citizens to:

1. eliminate witnesses who happened to run into North Korean agents in action
2. steal victims’ identities and infiltrate agents back into the countries concerned
3. force abductees to teach their local language and customs to North Korean agents
4. brainwash them into secret agents; the fishermen hardly had access to valuable intelligence, but they still could be trained as spies and sent back to the South
5. use abductees' expertise or special skills
6. use abductees as spouses for unusual residents in North Korea, especially lone foreigners such as defectors or other abductees

These six patterns are not mutually exclusive. Especially numbers 2, 3, and 4 derive from Kim Jong Il's secret order of 1976 to use foreign nationals more systematically and thereby improve the quality of North Korean spy activities, contributing to his "localization of spy education."

Further, better-educated people could be employed by the institutions responsible for waging propaganda campaigns against the South in, say, their broadcast facilities.

== North Korea's position about the abduction issue ==
North Korea has shown different positions on the abduction issue.

Regarding the alleged abduction of Japanese nationals, on September 17, 2002, the North Korean Government officially admitted to the kidnapping of 13 Japanese citizens at a meeting between North Korean leader Kim Jong Il and Japanese Prime Minister Junichiro Koizumi.

As for the South Korean abduction issue, North Korea has consistently claimed that there are no South Korean abductees in North Korea. After the Armistice in 1953, North Korea refused the release of South Korean wartime abductees despite a provision allowing civilian abductees to return home in Article III of the Korean War Armistice Agreement, a document signed by representatives from the United States, North Korea, and China. Instead, North Korea only returned 19 foreigners to the South.

In regards to the post-war abductees, North Korea insists that the South Koreans defected to North Korea, and remain there of their own free will, but refuses to allow South Korean relatives to communicate with them. Despite the testimonies of former abductees who have escaped from the North on their own, North Korea has held fast to the existing position: "There are no South Korean abductees and we cannot confirm their existence." The former husband of Japanese abductee Megumi Yokota, himself a suspected abductee from the South, was allowed to meet his South Korean mother in 2006, but Yokota's parents called the meeting a publicity stunt by North Korea, meant to isolate his daughter from her Japanese family, as the man has now remarried a native North Korean and has a son with her.

== Inter-Korean talks held ==
The Seoul government has clarified that resolving the Korean War POW and abductee issue is not only part of the Korean government's basic responsibility for protecting its citizens but one of the highest priorities. But despite the South Korean government's official urging for the North Korean government to deal with the abduction issue, there have been no substantial results so far. Since the inter-Korean Summit held in 2000, the South and the North dealt with the abduction issue at the talks; the second South–North Summit, inter-Korean Prime Minister talk, and rounds of ministerial-level or inter-Korean Red Cross talks.

- On June 15, 2000, at the first South–North Summit, South Korean President Kim Dae-jung and his North Korean counterpart, Kim Jong Il, agreed to settle humanitarian issues as early as possible, including the exchange of visiting groups of separated families and relatives. But from the words and phrases of their agreement, or June 15th North–South Joint Declaration, there were no references to the abductee issue.
  - In the same year, South Korea repatriated 63 convicted Communist spies and thereafter provided billions of dollars' worth of aid and trade to the North. But it has been reluctant to challenge North Korea's denials that it had abducted any South Koreans — even though Kim Jong Il admitted in 2002 that North Korea had kidnapped thirteen Japanese citizens and released five.
- On June 24, 2005, at the fifteenth round of Inter-Korean Ministerial Talks held in Seoul, the South and the North agreed to hold the sixth round of inter-Korean Red Cross talks to consult about humanitarian issues including confirmation of the fates and whereabouts of the missing people during Korean War.
  - During the sixth round of inter-Korean Red Cross talks held in August 2005, the South and the North discussed the issue of confirming the fates and whereabouts of missing people during the Korean War but produced no concrete results.
- During the eighth round of inter-Korean Red Cross talks held in April 2007, both Koreas agreed on "the framework of family reunion meetings", cooperating and addressing the issue regarding those who have been missing "during or after" the Korean War. It seemed to be a more realistic approach but also showed that North Korea was still refusing to admit any cases of abduction of South Koreans.
- At the second South–North Summit, on October 4, 2007, Roh Moo-hyun raised the prisoners of war (POW) and abduction issue to Kim Jong Il, but he failed to achieve a settlement because Kim Jong Il did not respond.
- First inter-Korean PM talks in November 2007 and ninth round of inter-Korean Red Cross talks (in November 2007) reconfirmed the agreement of 8th round of Red Cross talks.

== Substitution way: including the category of separated families ==
Because North Korea has been denying the existence of abductees and POWs on its territory, since November 2000, the South Korean government has been trying to resolve the issue through a more realistic approach of including the abductees and POWs in the category of separated families. By doing so, families of POWs or abductees also could participate in the normal reunion events that were organized for families separated by the war. As a result of these efforts, a total of 38 families of abductees and POWs were able to meet their family members in North Korea, and the fates of 88 people were confirmed.

In contrast with the official policies, the 2014 United Nations Report of the commission of inquiry on human rights in the DPRK states that the South Korean government has not been willing to raise the issue with North Korea, thinking of the abductions in political rather than humanitarian terms. Further, the report says that "Well over 200,000 persons who were taken from other countries to the DPRK may have potentially become victims of enforced disappearance, as defined in the Declaration for the Protection of All Persons from Enforced Disappearance" and "Most post-war abductee family members that have applied to attend a separated family reunion have received notification at the life status verification stage of the process, that their loved one has since deceased or their life status cannot be verified. Given the high level of surveillance on those of South Korean origin, and the nature of DPRK monitoring in society in general, from the Inmin-wiwon-oei (regional level) down to the Inminban (Neighbourhood Watch), the Commission finds it difficult to believe that life status verification is not possible in the DPRK."

== The law concerning abductees ==
Separately from talks with North Korea, the South Korean government enacted on April 2, 2007, the "Law for the Victims of Abduction to the North in the Post-War Years (or, the law concerning the assistance and compensation for the abducted persons since the Korean War Armistice Agreement)". Based on this law, the abducted persons, upon return to South Korea, will be entitled to receive assistance and, together with their family members, will be entitled to compensation for the human rights infringements sustained during the period. By this law, on October 16, 2007, the South Korean government formed the "Committee for the Compensation of the Victims of Abduction to the North."

== Number of abductees ==
=== Wartime abduction ===
Owing to the special situation of wartime, the exact number of Korean War abductees is difficult to determine. There are considerable differences in the numbers cited in various published documents and statistics. Overall range of the numbers is from 2,438 to 84,532. When the Korean National Red Cross set a special re-registration period to compile a list of missing people or the so-called "displaced people" in 1956, a total of 7,031 people registered. On February 26, 1957, the South delivered the list of 7,034 people to the North through the International Federation of Red Cross (IFRC). But according to the survey of "Korean War Abductees' Family Union" in March 2002, its number amounts to 94,700.

=== Post-war abduction ===
After the Korean War or during the Cold War period, a total of 3,795 people have been abducted and taken to North Korea. Subsequently, through the South Korean government's protests and various efforts via the Korean National Red Cross, 3,309 people have returned to South Korea. And six persons have recently escaped from the North and returned to South Korea on their own. A total of 480 South Korean abductees remain in North Korea against their will (as of December 2007). Below chart shows status of abducted persons by year.

Year	Number Abducted	Total	Year	Number Abducted	Total
1955	10	10	1973	8	392
1957	2	12	1974	30	422
1958	23	35	1975	31	453
1964	16	51	1977	3	456
1965	19	70	1978	4	460
1966	4	74	1980	1	461
1967	42	116	1985	3	464
1968	127	243	1987	13	477
1969	19	262	1995	1	478
1970	36	298	1999	1	479
1971	20	318	2000	1	480
1972	66	384			

== Major abduction cases ==
=== Status of abducted and detained persons ===
Division	Total	Fishermen	Korean Air	1-2 boat	Others
Abduction	3,796	3,696	50	24	26
Detention	480	427	11	24	18

=== Fishermen ===
On May 28, 1955, a South Korean fishing boat, the Daesung-ho, with a crew of ten fishermen, was hijacked by North Korean authorities. Since then, North Korean agents have hijacked numerous South Korean ships and kidnapped the seamen and fishermen aboard the vessels. In total, 3,696 fishermen and 120-plus fishing boats were seized by North Korea.

After strong protests from South Korean government, North Korea has repatriated 3,262 fishermen. An additional six fishermen have returned home to South Korea on their own between 2000 and 2007. A total of 427 fishermen are still held in North Korea.

=== High school students ===
Five South Korean high school students disappeared in 1977 and 1978. They had been regarded as missing people. But in the late 1990s, through the testimonies of North Korean spies in South Korea, it was discovered that they were working in North Korea as instructors, teaching the basics of South Korean lifestyle to would-be undercover Northern operatives. It has been known that among them was the husband of Japanese abductee Yokota Megumi, Kim Young-nam.

=== South Korean Navy personnel ===
On June 5, 1970, North Korean patrol boats seized a South Korean broadcast vessel with 20 crew on board off the west coast near the military demarcation line. The vessel was standing guard for South Korean fishing boats.

=== Korean Air Lines airplane hijacking ===
In December 1969, North Korean agents hijacked a South Korean airliner YS-11 to Wonsan en route from Kangnung to Seoul with 51 persons aboard; in February 1970, 39 of the crew and passengers were released. The remaining 11 were still detained in North Korea. Eventually, two stewardesses became announcers of the North Korean propaganda broadcasts that target South Korean audiences.

=== Abductions abroad ===
In February 1978, South Korean actress Choi Eun-hee and her film director husband Shin Sang-ok were kidnapped in Hong Kong and taken to Pyongyang. They were abducted on the orders of Kim Jong Il, the son of North Korean President Kim Il Sung, who wanted to use them to improve the North Korean film industry. Shin attempted to escape and spent five years in a re-education camp, before being reunited with his wife. While living in North Korea, Shin made the monster movie Pulgasari. In April 1984, South Korean government officials stated that the kidnappees were working in North Korea producing propaganda films that glorified Kim Il Sung and Kim Jong Il. The couple escaped to the United States in 1986 while on a filming assignment in Vienna.

In the 1990s most abductions of this sort took place in China, and their victims were political activists, missionaries, and real or suspected South Korean spies. All these abductions occurred in the Chinese North-East, near the borders of North Korea.

- In January 2000, South Korean, Reverend Kim Dong-shik, a legal resident of the United States, was reported missing in Yanji, northeastern China. Kim is reported to have been actively involved since 1995 in evangelical work among North Korean escapees/refugees in Yanji, Jilin Province, China. In October 2000, South Korea's National Intelligence Service reportedly confirmed that Kim was kidnapped by North Koreans in Yanbian, China, on February 1, 2000. In April 2005, the Seoul Central District Court convicted Chinese citizen Ryu Young-hwa of assisting North Korean agents in the abduction of Kim.
- In July 1995, a team of three North Korean agents and their two Korean-Chinese collaborators in Jilin abducted a South Korean pastor, Reverend Ahn Seung-woon, in southern Manchuria. Pyongyang claimed that Ahn defected voluntarily. But a Chinese court convicted a North Korean citizen of masterminding the abduction of Ahn and deported the agent to North Korea in July 1997 following a two-year prison term.

North Korean abductions have not been limited to northeast Asia and many documented abductees have been kidnapped while abroad, making the issue of serious concern to the international community.

- On April 5, 1971, Yu Sung-gun, a South Korean diplomat stationed at the South Korean embassy in West Germany, was abducted by North Koreans while in West Berlin.
- In June 1979, North Korean agents abducted South Korean teacher Ko Sang-moon in Norway, who had taken a taxi and stated his destination was "Embassy of Korea" but the driver took him to the embassy of the wrong country.
- In August 1987, Lee Chae-hwan, a South Korean student enrolled in the United States at the Massachusetts Institute of Technology was abducted by North Koreans while on a visit to Austria.

== See also ==
- Abduction of Shin Sang-ok and Choi Eun-hee
- Human rights in North Korea
- Korean War POWs detained in North Korea
- North Korea–South Korea relations
- North Korean abductions of Japanese citizens
