= Yaeko Taguchi =

Japanese citizen kidnapped by North Korea (born 1955)

- Taguchi in 1977
- Born: August 10, 1955 (would be 70); Japan
- Disappeared: June 12, 1978 (age 22); Niigata Prefecture, Japan (disputed)
- Status: Missing for 47 years, 11 months and 18 days
- Other name: Lee Un-hae
- Occupation: Hostess
- Known for: Victim of kidnapping
- Children: Koichiro Izuka (son)
- Family: Shigeo Izuka (brother)

Yaeko Taguchi (田口 八重子, Taguchi Yaeko; born August 10, 1955) is a Japanese citizen, one of several kidnapped by North Korea in the late 1970s and early 1980s.

== Abduction ==
Taguchi worked as a bar hostess in Tokyo, Japan, to raise her two children, a one-year-old son and three-year-old daughter, after divorcing her husband. She disappeared on June 12, 1978, at the age of 22, after dropping her children off at a day care centre.

She was forced to help teach Japanese to North Korean spy Kim Hyon-hui, who was the only surviving bomber of Korean Air Flight 858. In 2002, North Korea admitted that she and others had been abducted, but claimed that she had died on July 30, 1986, more than a year before the KAL 858 incident. Kim Hyon Hui testified Taguchi was given the Korean name Lee Un-hae (Korean: 리은혜; Hanja: 李恩恵) in North Korea. Kim said Taguchi often wept when telling her how much she missed her children.

== Children's life in Japan ==
Her children were raised by her siblings in Japan. Her son Koichiro was raised by her brother Shigeo Izuka and his wife, while her daughter was adopted by her older sister after her ex-husband was banned from visiting. When they were adults, Shigeo told them that they were Taguchi's children. Her son, an engineer at an information technology company in Tokyo, went public in 2004 claiming that claims of her death were "nonsense", and he wanted her returned. Shigeo became Chair of the Association of NARKN along with the Yokota family.

In 2008, Taguchi's son Koichiro Izuka said:

I was separated from my mother just 30 years ago when I was one year and four months old. Therefore I don't remember my mother's warmth, voice, or smell. We want to return to being an ordinary family, and regain a part of the time lost over the last 30 years.

In March 2009, Kim Hyon-hui met Yaeko Taguchi's son Koichiro Izuka in Busan, South Korea. Kim told Izuka she believes Taguchi is still alive. Izuka said, "I received evidence that my mother is certainly alive. I have new hope for our rescue efforts." In October 2011, South Korean intelligence agencies reported they believed dozens of South Korean and Japanese abduction victims were moved to Wonhwa-ri in South Pyongan Province; this group may have included Taguchi, Megumi Yokota, and Tadaaki Hara.

In 2014 Taguchi's brother, too, testified about her kidnapping.

== In media and culture ==
Taguchi was played by Mayumi Sada in the 2006 NTV television film Saikai ~Yokota Megumi-san no Negai~. A Japanese documentary about Kim Hyun-hui's life featured her meeting Yaeko and how she sings lullabies to her children. Her son Koichiro Izuka wrote his book When My Mother was Kidnapped I was One about how he was adopted by his uncle as a baby and struggled for 20 years to see his mother again. It was adapted as a manga authored by Souichi Mato, who wrote about Kaoru Hasuike's and Megumi Yokota's lives in North Korea.

== See also ==
- List of kidnappings
- List of people who disappeared mysteriously: post-1970
- North Korean abductions of Japanese citizens
