= Yang Sun-im =

Korean activist (born 1900)

- Hangul: 양순임
- Hanja: 梁順任
- RR: Yang Sunim
- MR: Yang Sunim

Yang Sun-im (Korean: 양순임; Hanja: 梁順任) is a Korean activist who heads the Association for the Pacific War Victims (태평양전쟁희생자유족회, 太平洋戰爭犧牲者遺族會) and plaintiff groups for lawsuits by former comfort women. She is the mother-in-law of Takashi Uemura, a former reporter of Asahi Shimbun.

In 2010, she formed the "Civilian Claims Tribunal Against Japan," and was indicted for defrauding about 30,000 people of 1.5 billion won in the name of legal fees and other expenses by 2011 by recruiting members, claiming that the families of those born between 1900 and 1930 would receive compensation. However, the Seoul High Court acquitted him on the grounds that he "did not try to deceive the bereaved families (but) rather encouraged those in charge of recruiting (members) to conduct legitimate recruitment activities targeting only actual victims.
