= Yokota family =

Family known for human rights activism

- Born: Shigeru Yokota; November 14, 1932 Sakie Yokota; February 4, 1936 (age 90)
- Died: Shigeru Yokota; June 5, 2020 (aged 87)
- Occupation: Human rights activists
- Known for: Founders of the National Association for the Rescue of Japanese Kidnapped by North Korea

The Yokota family, husband Shigeru (November 14, 1932 – June 5, 2020) and wife Sakie (born February 4, 1936) along with their twin sons Takuya and Tetsuya founded the Japanese National Association for the Rescue of Japanese Kidnapped by North Korea in 1997. The Association supports the victims of North Korea's abductions of Japanese citizens in the late 1970s and early 1980s. The Yokotas' daughter Megumi was kidnapped in 1977 by North Korean spies; her current whereabouts are unknown.

Sakie Yokota once met with U.S. President George W. Bush to talk about demanding sanctions on North Korea and in 2013 she testified about her daughter's abduction.

In 2014, the Yokotas met Megumi's Korean daughter. Also in 2014, Sakie Yokota met U.S. President Barack Obama to discuss the case of her daughter and other abductees. The meeting came after a press conference Obama held with then Prime Minister Shinzo Abe. During the meeting, Obama said he was "moved by their tragic experiences."

On September 19, 2017, President of the United States Donald Trump, in a speech to the United Nations General Assembly, included Yokota in a series of accusations against the North Korean government, saying, "We know it kidnapped a sweet 13-year-old Japanese girl from a beach in her own country to enslave her as a language tutor for North Korea's spies."

On June 5, 2020, Shigeru Yokota died at age 87. He had been hospitalized in Kawasaki for more than two years. On October 24, 2020, former Prime Minister Abe and Prime Minister Yoshihide Suga attended a memorial service for Shigeru, where Suga praised him and said he would "take the lead in making a breakthrough (on the abductees issue), without missing any opportunity."

Sakie Yokota wrote a book, North Korea Kidnapped My Daughter, about the issue.

== See also ==
- North Korean abductions of Japanese
- Abduction: The Megumi Yokota Story
- Megumi (manga)
