= Megumi Yokota =

Japanese citizen kidnapped by North Korea (born 1964)

- Megumi Yokota in a 1977 photo taken in North Korea after her abduction from her hometown in Japan
- Born: 5 October 1964 (would be 62); Nagoya, Japan
- Disappeared: 15 November 1977 (aged 13); Niigata Prefecture
- Status: Missing for 48 years, 10 months and 26 days
- Occupation: Student

Megumi Yokota (横田 めぐみ, Yokota Megumi; born 5 October 1964) is a Japanese citizen who was abducted by a North Korean agent in 1977 when she was a thirteen-year-old junior high school student. She was one of at least seventeen Japanese citizens kidnapped by North Korea in the late 1970s and early 1980s. The North Korean government has admitted to kidnapping Yokota, but has said that she died in captivity. Yokota's parents and others in Japan have publicly expressed the belief that she is still alive in North Korea and have waged a public campaign seeking her return to Japan.

== History ==
Megumi Yokota was abducted on 15 November 1977 at the age of thirteen while walking home from school in her seaside village in Niigata Prefecture. It's believed that she was abducted because she happened to witness activities of North Korean agents in Japan and so the agents wanted to silence her. North Korean agents reportedly dragged her into a boat and took her straight to North Korea to a facility, where she was taught the Korean language. She was eventually assigned to a university where North Korean spies were taught foreign languages, customs and practices. Here she taught Japanese to would-be spies, who were being trained to infiltrate Japan. Also at the earlier facility were two South Korean high school students, aged 18 and 16, who had been abducted from South Korea in August 1977 and in August the next year, three more 16-year-old South Korean students were abducted and taken to the same facility. These included Kim Young-nam, who would reportedly later marry Yokota.

After many years of speculation and no new leads, in January 1997, information about Megumi's abduction was disclosed to Yokota's parents by Tatsukichi Hyomoto, a secretary to Diet member Atsushi Hashimoto, by a phone call. In 2002, North Korea admitted that she and others had been abducted, but claimed that she had committed suicide on 13 March 1994, and returned what it said were her cremated remains. Japan stated that a DNA test showed they could not have been her remains (although it was later discovered that a junior faculty member with no previous analysis of cremated specimens had tested the remains and may have accidentally contaminated them), and her family does not believe that she would have committed suicide. She is believed to have been abducted by Sin Gwang-su.

In the North in 1986, Yokota married a South Korean national, Kim Young-nam (김영남; 金英男), likely also abducted, and the couple had a daughter in 1987, Kim Hye-gyong (김혜경, whose real name was later revealed to be Kim Eun-gyong, 김은경). In June 2006, Kim Young-nam, who has since remarried, was allowed to have his family from the South visit him, and during the reunion he confirmed Yokota had committed suicide in 1994 after suffering from mental illness, and had several attempts at suicide before. He also claimed the remains returned in 2004 are genuine. His comments were however widely dismissed as repeating the official Pyongyang line, with Megumi's father claiming that Young-nam was not allowed to speak freely during his interview in Pyongyang, stating that "he was likely restricted in terms of what he can say" and that "it looked as if he was reading a script". In June 2012, Choi Sung-ryong, head of a support group for relatives of South Koreans abducted to the North, claimed that he had obtained North Korean government documents which stated that Yokota had died from "depression" on 14 December 2004. However, his claim has been dismissed by many as he refused to release the documents to the public.

It is widely believed, especially in Japan, that Yokota is still alive. In November 2011 a South Korean magazine, Weekly Chosun, stated that a 2005 directory of Pyongyang residents listed a woman, named Kim Eun-gong, with the same birth date as Yokota. The directory gave Kim's spouse's name as "Kim Yong Nam". Japanese government sources verified on 18 November 2011 that they had reviewed the directory but had yet to draw a conclusion on the identity of the woman listed. Sources later indicated that Kim Eun-gong was actually Yokota's 24-year-old daughter. In 2012, it was reported that North Korean authorities were keeping Kim under strict surveillance. In August 2012, Choi Seong-ryong stated that sources in North Korea had told him that Kim Eun-gong had been placed under the supervision of Kim Jong Un's sister, Kim Yo Jong, and that the North Korean government may be planning on using Yokota's daughter as a "card" in future negotiations with Japan. Reportedly, in 2010 the North Korean government offered to allow Yokota's parents to visit Kim Eun-gyong in a country "other than Japan" but the Japanese government and Yokota's parents were wary about the offer, suspecting it as a ploy by the North Korean government to seek an advantage in ongoing diplomatic negotiations. In March 2014, the parents of Megumi Yokota met their granddaughter Kim Eun-gyong for the first time in Mongolia, along with her own baby daughter. While early reports did not publicly identify the child’s father, multiple accounts noted that Kim’s husband accompanied her to the meeting, though his personal history wasn't disclosed at the time. Sakie Yokota later said she couldn't discuss Kim in detail, but emphasized that they promised to meet again if Megumi and the other abductees ever return to Japan.

=== Thae Yong-ho's revelations ===
Thae Yong-ho, North Korea's former Deputy Ambassador to the United Kingdom who defected to the South, claimed in his book Passcode to the Third Floor Secretariat that the controversy regarding the return of Yokota's remains was unexpected by Kim Jong Il and caused significant infighting between the ministry and Kim Jong Il's staff, leading Vice-Minister for Foreign Affairs Kang Sok-ju to demand an explanation. The Japanese Affairs Department of the Foreign Ministry internally published a report:

Yokota Megumi died of a mental illness at the No. 49 Hospital [A special type of Psychiatric Institutions located in remote areas reserved for severe illnesses]. When the abduction issue became part of Japanese-DPRK talks, the party ordered her remains to be found. There were no accurate records kept about Megumi at the No. 49 Hospital, however. She died at a time when those who died at the hospital were buried in a mountain behind the hospital without even a funeral. The hospital authorities were put in a difficult spot. The authorities relied simply on the memory of a staff member to find the spot where they thought Megumi's remains were buried, and after looking around there they found some remains. Certain that the remains were Megumi's, the body was sent to Japan but a DNA test revealed that it was not the case.

Thae believed that Kim Jong Il, desperately wanting normalization of relations and economic aid, had not deliberately sent fake remains and was genuinely surprised by the resultant outrage from the Japanese press and the Koizumi government. When the Japanese offer of normalization was rescinded, contingent on further progress over the abductions issue, Kim allegedly told Kang, "As expected, the Japs can't be trusted. The American bastards are better."

== DNA controversy ==
Yokota was alleged to have died at the age of 29. However, the death certificate provided in support of this assertion appears to have been falsified, and DNA tests on the remains said to be hers were not a positive match.

An interview in the 3 February 2005 issue of Nature revealed that the DNA analysis on Megumi's supposed remains had been performed by a member of the medical department of Teikyo University, Yoshii Tomio. Yoshii, it later transpired, was a relatively junior faculty member, of lecturer status, in a forensic department that had neither a professor nor even an assistant professor. He said that he had no previous experience in the analysis of cremated specimens, described his tests as inconclusive, and remarked that such samples were very easily contaminated by anyone coming in contact with them, like "stiff sponges that can absorb anything". The five tiny samples he had been given to work on (the largest of them 1.5 grams) had anyway been used up in his laboratory, so independent verification was thereafter impossible.

When the Japanese government's Chief Cabinet Secretary, Hiroyuki Hosoda, referred to this article as inadequate and a misrepresentation of the government-commissioned analysis, Nature responded in an editorial (17 March), saying that:

Japan is right to doubt North Korea's every statement. But its interpretation of the DNA tests has crossed the boundary of science's freedom from political interference. Nature's interview with the scientist who carried out the tests raised the possibility that the remains were merely contaminated, making the DNA tests inconclusive. This suggestion is uncomfortable for a Japanese government that wants to have North Korea seen as unambiguously fraudulent. ...

The inescapable fact is that the bones may have been contaminated. ... It is also entirely possible that North Korea is lying. But the DNA tests that Japan is counting on won't resolve the issue. The problem is not in the science but in the fact that the government is meddling in scientific matters at all. Science runs on the premise that experiments, and all the uncertainty involved in them, should be open for scrutiny. Arguments made by other Japanese scientists that the tests should have been carried out by a larger team are convincing. Why did Japan entrust them to one scientist working alone, one who no longer seems to be free to talk about them?

Japan's policy seems a desperate effort to make up for what has been a diplomatic failure ... Part of the burden for Japan's political and diplomatic failure is being shifted to a scientist for doing his job—deriving conclusions from experiments and presenting reasonable doubts about them. But the friction between North Korea and Japan will not be decided by a DNA test. Likewise, the interpretation of DNA test results cannot be decided by the government of either country. Dealing with North Korea is no fun, but it doesn't justify breaking the rules of separation between science and politics.

== Media attention ==
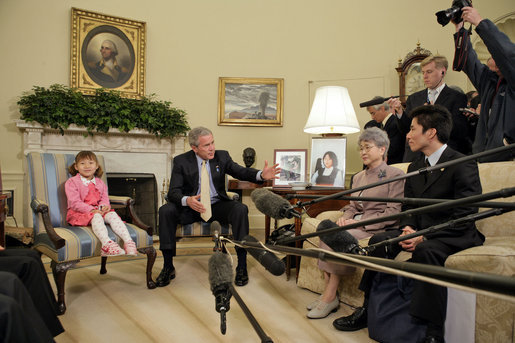
Megumi's mother Sakie Yokota (on the right near the lamp) with then-US president George W. Bush

Documentaries made about Megumi and the other kidnapping cases include: KIDNAPPED! The Japan-North Korea Abduction Cases (2005), Abduction: The Megumi Yokota Story (2006), Megumi (2007), and Megumi (2008). In October 2006 a special aired on Japan television titled Reunion ~ Megumi Yokota's Wish (Saikai ~Yokota Megumi-san no Negai~; 再会～横田めぐみさんの願い). It starred Mayuko Fukuda as a young Yokota, and Nana Katase as grown Yokota.

Yokota's parents supervised the creation of a serial manga, one titled Megumi (めぐみ) detailing her last days in Japan before her abduction, and another titled Dakkan about returned victim Kaoru Hasuike. The Japanese government produced an anime adaption of the manga.

In 2010, the Shinjuku Theater has performed a stage adaptation of Megumi's life called "The Pledge to Megumi" (めぐみへの誓い) The main storyline centers on Megumi Yokota before and during her abduction by North Korea, and with a fictional ending where Megumi is reunited with her parents.

On 10 October 2011, Japan Today reported a defector had asserted that Yokota was still alive, but that she was not allowed to leave North Korea because she was in possession of sensitive information.

In October 2011, South Korean intelligence agencies reported they believed dozens of South Korean and Japanese abduction victims were moved to Wonhwa-ri in South Pyongan Province; this group may have included Yokota, Yaeko Taguchi, and Tadaaki Hara.

On 19 September 2017, U.S. President Donald Trump, in a speech to the United Nations General Assembly, included Yokota in a series of accusations against the North Korean government, saying, "We know it kidnapped a sweet 13-year-old Japanese girl from a beach in her own country to enslave her as a language tutor for North Korea's spies." Yokota's mother Sakie said, "I was really surprised, but it was great, and I'm thankful to (Trump) for bringing up the issue and putting it into words in front of those representatives from around the world. Every word on the issue is a chance. I believe (Trump's words) had a profound significance to the issue." It was reported that Trump sent a letter expressing his condolences to Sakie over the death of her husband Shigeru Yokota, who died on 5 June 2020, at the age of 87.

== Songs about Yokota ==
In early 2007, Paul Stookey (of U.S. folk group Peter, Paul and Mary) introduced a song dedicated to Megumi, titled "Song for Megumi". Stookey toured Japan to sing the song in February and attended media interviews with Yokota's parents.

In 2010, British rock singer Peter Frampton recorded two songs about Megumi Yokota after watching the documentary Abduction: The Megumi Yokota Story on PBS. Titled "Asleep at the Wheel" and "Suite Liberte", the songs are part of his album Thank You, Mr. Churchill.

== TV movie ==
In 2006, Nippon Television (NTV) aired Saikai -Yokota Megumi-san no Negai- (再会 ~横田めぐみさんの願い~ Reunion ~Yokota Megumi's Wish~) a television film about the life of Megumi Yokota. The movie starred Mayuko Fukuda and Nana Katase as Yokota during different periods in her life.

== See also ==
- List of people who disappeared mysteriously: post-1970
- Kim Hyon-hui
- North Korean abductions of Japanese citizens
- North Korean abductions of South Koreans
- POW/MIA
- North Korea Kidnapped My Daughter

== Sources ==
- "Tokyo ‘Hiding Knowledge of Megumi Yokota’s Death’", The Chosun Ilbo, August 17, 2006.
- "Until The Day We Sing Together", mylessenex.com, March 24, 2003.
- "Accounted For, At Last", Time (Asia), September 24, 2002.
- "Clues Found in North Korean Kidnappings", The Dong-a Ilbo, January 7, 2006.
- "U.S. folk star writes song about abductee Yokota", The Japan Times, February 16, 2007.
- "Parental love versus Kim Jong-il", By Kosuke Takahashi of Asia Times Online, April 28, 2009.
