= Takashi Uemura (academic) =

Japanese academic and former journalist

Takashi Uemura (植村 隆, Uemura Takashi) is a Japanese academic and former journalist who, while a reporter for The Asahi Shimbun, wrote about comfort women. He later came under scrutiny for alleged inaccuracy of terminology and omissions of information. Rival newspapers attacked him for twisting the truth, and more far-right figures went so far as to accuse him of fabrication.

His mother-in-law is Yang Sun-Im, a Korean activist who heads the Association for the Pacific War Victims and plaintiff groups for lawsuits by former comfort women. Yang was charged with fraudulently misleading donors to her organization, but has been acquitted, according to Uemura.

== Kim Hak-sun, story of a comfort woman ==
Uemura ran a story dated August 11, 1991 in the Asahi newspaper, which profiled a former comfort woman based on a tape-recorded testimony. The identity of the woman was withheld from Uemura at the time, but later it transpired that she was Kim Hak-sun. Kim disclosed her identity in a press conference she held 3 days after this article.

The precise wording in Uemura's article was as follows: "she was taken away under the name of the 'women volunteer corps'" and was a "Korean comfort woman serving the army. (Note: In Japanese: 「女子挺身隊」の名で戦場に連行され、日本軍人相手に売春行為を強いられた「朝鮮人従軍慰安婦」)

Uemura followed up with another article on December 25, 1991, based on the interview of Kim Hak-sun conducted by Japanese lawyers.

== Controversy ==
By 2014, Uemura had retired from the newspaper and was seeking university teaching positions. The articles Uemura had written in the 1990s about the comfort women came under fire, criticized for the choice of language as well as suppression of certain crucial information.

In 2014 Asahi retracted certain comfort women-related stories dating to the 1990s which were based on Seiji Yoshida's discredited testimony. There had been a pall of suspicion hanging over the veracity of Seiji's alleged accounts since soon after its publication. (Note: Yoshida claimed he was engaged by the army to round up residents in Jeju Island to be forcibly recruited as comfort women.) As a collateral fallout of these retractions, Uemura, whose articles were also subjected to certain critiques aforementioned, got labeled as "fabricator of the comfort women" by "Right-wing tabloids", even though Uemura was not the writer of these pieces based on Yoshida's hoax. (Note: Asahi subjected 16 Yoshida-related pieces to retraction (torikeshi) on the "Verification" (kenshō) article dated August 5, 2014, and added 2 more partial/entire retraction in the "Corrections" article in December.) (Note: The Asahi initially disclosed that the writer to break the Yoshida stories was certain ex-journalist of the Osaka Social Affairs Department age 66 as of August, or age 67 as of September 2, 2014, who confessed to believing Yoshida's story entirely. Then a different ex-journalist aged 66 later came forward to the 3rd party committee saying he may have possibly been the one to write the first article, but his memory was fuzzy. Thus the identity of the writer became inconclusive, as of December. Uemura was only age 56 as of 2014. Uemura was aged 56 as of 2014.) (Note: Uemura has stated on record he did listen to Yoshida talk for 3, 4 hours on one occasion, but the story of about Jeju Island, at the core [of the controversy], did not emerge, and what he wrote afterwards thereon was insubstantial.) Uemura has insisted he did not write any stories based on the Yoshida testimony.

While Uemura's articles were not outright retracted, Uemura's reporting on the comfort women were criticized and subjected to corrigenda in Asahi's "Corrections" article. Specifically, his phraseology that the "comfort women" were recruited "nominally as women volunteer corps", and secondly, for omitting the Korean victim Kim Hak-sun's background that she had been a kisaeng (courtesan) in-training prior to being dispatched as a comfort woman in China.

This "Corrections" piece was issued in the form of a "Third-party Committee Report".

=== Malapropism allegations ===
Rival papers such as the Sankei and Yomiuri have attacked the Uemura's use of the term "women volunteer corps" (女子挺身隊, Joshi Teishin-tai) to mean "comfort women", (Note: A Japan Times article thus capitalizes it as "Joshi Teishin-tai" indicating a proper name. An Asahi articles calls it a phrase meaning "women volunteer corps".) and similar usage of "volunteer corps" (teishin-tai) in an Asahi newspaper glossary piece. The Sankei newspaper has accused Uemura of "distortions of facts" in using such terminology, even though the Asahi's "Corrections" piece, the Third-party committee concluded there was no "distortion" here on Uemura's part.

The thrust of the criticism here is that the term Joshi Teishin-tai "women volunteer corps" was an entity clearly distinguishable from comfort women. (Note: A point echoed by a former Asahi correspondent (Keiji Maekawa).) The "women volunteer corps" has been described as a body akin to "Rosie the Riveter" in the U.S. Critics say that these comfort women were never recruited "as a" volunteer corps in fact, or even by name.

However, the instance of the term "volunteers" (teishin-tai) being used to refer to "comfort women" is hardly unique to the Asahi's or Uemura's articles dating to 1991–1992. There are multiple instances where the term has been used in the sense of "comfort women" in Korea, including a 1973 book, a 1946 newspaper article, and a name of two support organization for Korean comfort women.

As a matter of fact, the tape recording of the comfort woman (who turned out to be Kim Hak-sun) which Uemura used for his article had been provided him by the support group that refers to the comfort women as "volunteer corps". While its official English name is The Korean Council for the Women Drafted for Military Sexual Slavery by Japan, its native Korean name is Hanguk Jeongsindae Munje Daechaek Hyeobuihoe (Note: Jeongsindae is also transliterated as Chongsindae (McCune-Reischauer romainzation) used by e.g. American scholar Chunghee Sarah Soh. Soh states that Jungshindae is another alternate spelling.) which transliterates into Japanese as Kankoku Teishintai Mondai Taisaku Kyogikai and literally means "The Korean Council to Address the Issue of the Volunteer Corps". The fact that Uemura obtained access to hear the tape from this organization is plainly stated in his August 11 article.

When questioned in 2015, Uemura stated he could not ascertain if the term Joshi Teishin-tai ("women volunteer corps") actually appeared in the tape of Kim Hak-sun's testimony he listened to, since he did not retain a copy of the tape, leaving possibility the open that Kim did not use the term in the tape. As Uemura has pointed out, Kim Hak-sun was subsequently quoted as saying "I belonged to the volunteer corps" in such Korean Newspapers as the Joongang Ilbo. but Kim was also being introduced to the world at large as someone who was conducted away under the pretext of "volunteer corps" by Professor Yun Chung-ok who headed the support organization, (Note: And the Sankei newspaper which attacked Uemura for the use of the terminology admitted it too has used the terminology in print based on Yun's lectures.) and Yun was the intermediary who spoke to Uemura and provided access to the tape, and additionally, Yun recounted her own experience where she withdrew from college because her parents feared she could be coerced into joining the "women's volunteer corps". There was admittedly a popular notion that the "volunteer corps" was linked with the Japanese government implementing forced deployment of Korean women as sex workers, but this was strictly a rumor according to critics of the "paradigm" that the comfort women were forced, and if the brothel positions were being lied to as factory jobs, such misrepresentations were only undertaken by Korean human traffickers rather than the Japanese "colonial authorities" according to these critics.

=== Alleged suppression of Kim's kisaeng background ===
Three days after Uemura's article, Kim Hak-sun held her press conference August 14, 1991 attended by The Hokkaido Shimbun and Korean media where she revealed she attended a kisaeng school for three years, starting at the age of 14. Subsequently, on August 15, the Korean newspaper The Hankyoreh wrote a piece revealing that Kim "was sold to a kisaeng school (gwonbeon; Japanese: kenban (検番)) (Note: Sometimes styled kwonbon and glossed as a "guild"; In Japanese also written as 券番 or 巻番。) in Pyongyang at the age of 14 by her mother, and taken away (some years later) by her gwonbeon foster-father.

It was alleged by Professor Tsutomu Nishioka in articles written by the reporter for the Shūkan Bunshun weekly tabloid that Uemura must have been privy to the information about Kim's kisaeng background but had deliberately suppressed it. In 2014, Uemura stated that he had not heard her mention the kisaeng school background in the tape, and in October 2019, the tape was produced as evidence to the Tokyo District Court, revealing that the word kisaeng went unmentioned.

=== Pressures and threats of harm ===
Uemura left the Asahi Shimbun in March 2014, to pursue a second career as university lecturer. When the anti-Asahi bashing started faulting them for the comfort women coverage, Uemura became the target alongside. Hokusei Gakuen University in Sapporo, in northern Japan, where he lectures, has come under pressure to fire him. The college was bombarded by anonymous letters demanding his removal. "Many Japanese-language users of social media such as X and Facebook have joined in the drubbing of the Asahi, accusing it of "damaging" Japan's reputation", according to The Japan Times. This conduct has escalated into blackmail in the case of extremists among social media users. There has even been a bomb threat on this Hokkaido campus, blamed on ultra-nationalists; There has also been a call to drive Uemura's teenage daughter into suicide, which also has been attributed to the ultra-right.

=== Libel suits ===
In articles which ran in the weekly news magazine Shūkan Bunshun condemning Uemura, Professor Tsutomu Nishioka who was one of the sources, accused Uemura of engaging in willful "fabrication". Uemura has since initiated legal proceedings over the public accusation against its publisher, the Bungeishunjū publishing company. On March 12, 2021, the Supreme Court handed down a verdict dismissing all of Uemura's appeal finally.

On January 9, 2015, Uemura filed a defamation suit with the Tokyo District Court against Nishioka, then-professor of Korean studies at Tokyo Christian University, and Bungeishunjū, Ltd. (the publisher of Shūkan Bunshun) in response to the public accusations against him.

The suit focused on three claims made by Nishioka: first, that Uemura's depiction of Kim being "taken away under the name of the 'women volunteer corps'" as involving a misnomer and constituting a fabrication of facts; second, that Uemura knowingly suppressed Kim's background as a kisaeng in training to alter the story of her becoming comfort women that was different from the truth, third, that Uemura had written his piece to influence the impending class-action lawsuits by former comfort women because Uemura' Korean mother-in-law headed a comfort women support organization involved in this litigation.

Uemura provided the following counterarguments to these points. The term "volunteer corps" at least (Note: without "female".) was indeed used as synonym for comfort women in Korea and not a term conjured up by him. Kim being sent to kisaeng school and she being turned into comfort women were two separate events. On the third point, he said he accepted the assignment based on a lead given him by the Seoul bureau chief of his newspaper (not at his mother-in-law's behest), and he denied having written the piece to fulfill ulterior motives that Nishioka accused him of.

On February 18, 2020, Sapporo High Court handed down a verdict dismissing all of Uemura's appeal.
