= Kim Dong-shik =

Korean American minister (1947–2000)

- Born: 1947; South Korea
- Disappeared: after January 16, 2000; North Korea (presumed)
- Occupation: Christian minister
- Known for: Abduction and likely death at hands of suspected North Korean agents

Kim Dong-shik (Note: Sometimes romanized as Kim Dong-Sik or Kim Dongsik.) (Korean: 김동식; Hanja: 金東植, 1947 – disappeared January 16, 2000) was a Korean-American Protestant minister who went missing in China in January 2000. His missionary and humanitarian work in China had involved aiding North Korean defectors there, and evidence eventually emerged that the North Korean regime was responsible for his disappearance. In 2015, a U.S. federal court awarded damages to his family after determining that Kim had likely died in a North Korean prison camp after being abducted from China by North Korean operatives who regarded Kim's activities as a threat to the regime.

== Background ==
Kim was born in South Korea in 1947. He moved to Chicago, Illinois as a young man, becoming a permanent resident of the United States. He served as minister of the Chicago Evangelical Holiness Church.

In the 1990s, Kim came to the attention of North Korean authorities by aiding North Korean defectors in China, and by evangelizing to North Korean athletes attending the 1996 Olympic Games in Atlanta, Georgia. In late 1999, Kim was in northeastern China, where he had established shelters and a school for orphaned and handicapped refugees.

== Disappearance ==
On January 16, 2000, Kim was boarding (or, according to some sources, was forced into) a taxi outside a restaurant in Yanji, a Chinese city near the North Korean border, when unknown men jumped in after him and the vehicle sped away. Although Kim's family suspected North Korean involvement in his disappearance, little solid evidence about his fate emerged until 2004, when a North Korean defector to South Korea told authorities he had seen Kim in a cell at the Ministry of State Security office in Hoeryong – a North Korean town across the border from Yanji – shortly after his abduction. In 2005, a Chinese national of Korean descent confessed in a South Korean court that he had aided North Korean agents to abduct Kim and transport him across the border to North Korea.

In January 2005, a number of Illinois lawmakers, including then-senator Barack Obama, jointly signed a letter to North Korea's ambassador to the United Nations, describing Kim as a "hero" and requesting information from North Korea as to his whereabouts. Intelligence reports suggested that Kim had died on an undetermined date in a North Korean prison camp in the outskirts of Pyongyang.

== Lawsuit ==
In 2009, Kim's son and younger brother, both U.S. citizens, brought a lawsuit against North Korea in a U.S. federal court, seeking damages for Kim's torture and murder. Although the Foreign Sovereign Immunities Act (FSIA) usually protects foreign governments from being sued in U.S. courts, an exception exists for countries designated as state sponsors of terrorism, including North Korea. (Note: North Korea was first designated as a state sponsor of terrorism by the U.S. government in 1988. It was removed from that list on October 11, 2008, and was re-added on November 20, 2017. The Kim family filed its lawsuit in April 2009 within a 6-month leeway specified by the Foreign Sovereign Immunities Act.) North Korea did not respond to the lawsuit, which was initially dismissed by the court for lack of first-hand evidence that Kim had been tortured and killed by the North Korean regime. However, in December 2014, an appeals court overturned the dismissal, stating that evidence of North Korea's involvement in Kim's abduction, together with testimony from expert witnesses about widespread torture in North Korean prison camps, were sufficient for the family to seek damages. On April 9, 2015, the court handed down a default judgment that Kim had been abducted by North Korean agents, and had likely died in a North Korean prison camp after suffering torture there. His family was awarded damages of $330 million. The Times of Israel reported that "North Korea is not expected to pay the damages, but lawyers will seek the confiscation of North Korean assets such as bank accounts and company shares."

== Aftermath ==
In May 2019, a North Korean cargo ship, Wise Honest, was judicially seized in Indonesia by the U.S. government for allegedly transporting and selling North Korean coal in breach of international sanctions. U.S. federal judges ordered that the vessel be sold to compensate the family of Kim Dong-shik, and also the family of Otto Warmbier, an American tourist who had died in 2017 shortly after being repatriated in a coma to the U.S. from North Korea, where he had spent more than a year in custody on a charge of subversion. In both cases, U.S. federal courts had found North Korea liable for the men's deaths.

== See also ==
- List of kidnappings
- North Korean abductions of Japanese citizens
