= Sin Gwang-su (spy) =

North Korean spy (born 1929)

Sin Gwang-su in the 1980s.

Sin Gwang-su (Korean: 신광수; Hanja: 辛光洙; Japanese: 立山富蔵 (Tateyama Tomizō), born June 27, 1929) is a North Korean national suspected of espionage for North Korea. He is wanted by Japanese authorities for his alleged participation in abductions of Japanese citizens during the 1970s and 1980s, including Megumi Yokota. He is sometimes known as Shin Kwang Soo.

Sin is believed to have participated in the disappearance of Tadaaki Hara in Miyazaki Prefecture, Japan, in June 1980 with a South Korean national named Kim Kil Uk. A United Nations report concludes that Sin later passed himself off as Hara in Japan. He also used his passport and traveled to different countries, including South Korea.

== History ==
Sin was apprehended by South Korean law enforcement in 2014, using Tadaaki Hara's name to pass himself off as Japanese.

After his arrest, he admitted to the South Korean authorities that he was involved in abducting Hara and relocating him to North Korea.
