= Patty Kim (filmmaker) =

Patty Kim is a Canadian filmmaker and co-founder of Safari Media. She co-directed the 2006 award-winning feature documentary Abduction: The Megumi Yokota Story, produced in association with the BBC, and executive-produced by Jane Campion. The film was honored with an Alfred I. Du Pont Award. She also co-directed and produced the 2004 documentary Destiny about a young photojournalist murdered by a mob in Somalia; the film won a prize at the New York International Independent Film and Video Festival. Patty was consulting producer of the feature documentary "Give Up Tomorrow" which took home top prizes at the 2011 Tribeca Film Festival. She has worked as a journalist with the National Geographic Channel, National Geographic Television, Canadian Broadcasting Corporation, NBC, and CBS.
