= Asian Film Festival of Dallas =

Film festival

- Location: Dallas, Texas, United States
- Founded: 2001; 24 years ago
- Website: asianfilmdallas.com

The Asian Film Festival of Dallas (AFFD) is an annual film festival that takes place in July or August in Dallas, Texas. The festival showcases a diverse range of international films from Asia alongside Asian-American features and short films. Screenings take place at the Angelika Film Center at Mockingbird Station. AFFD is the largest Asian film festival in the southern United States.

The festival awards jury prizes for the best short and feature films in competition, as well as an Audience Award.

Well Go USA Entertainment is a major sponsor of the festival.

== History ==
The Asian Film Festival of Dallas was founded in 2001. Its first edition was in March 2002, as a four-day-long curated festival presenting 12 features from five countries. Films screened in the first year included the Dallas premiere of Battle Royale and repertory screenings of classic Asian films, such as Raise the Red Lantern and Seven Samurai. The festival was founded by Dallas local and aspiring filmmaker Mye Hoang as a way to share Asian films with Dallas audiences.

The festival expanded to a week-long event in 2003 and added a juried competition.

== Audience Award winners ==
- 2009: Ip Man
- 2010: Mao's Last Dancer
- 2011: Seven Souls in Skull Castle
- 2013: Go Grandriders
- 2015: The Last Reel
- 2024: Ashima
