= Tokyo Christian University =

Private university in Chiba, Japan

Coordinates: 35°44′16.42″N 139°49′39.00″E

- 東京基督教大学; Tōkyō kirisutokyō daigaku
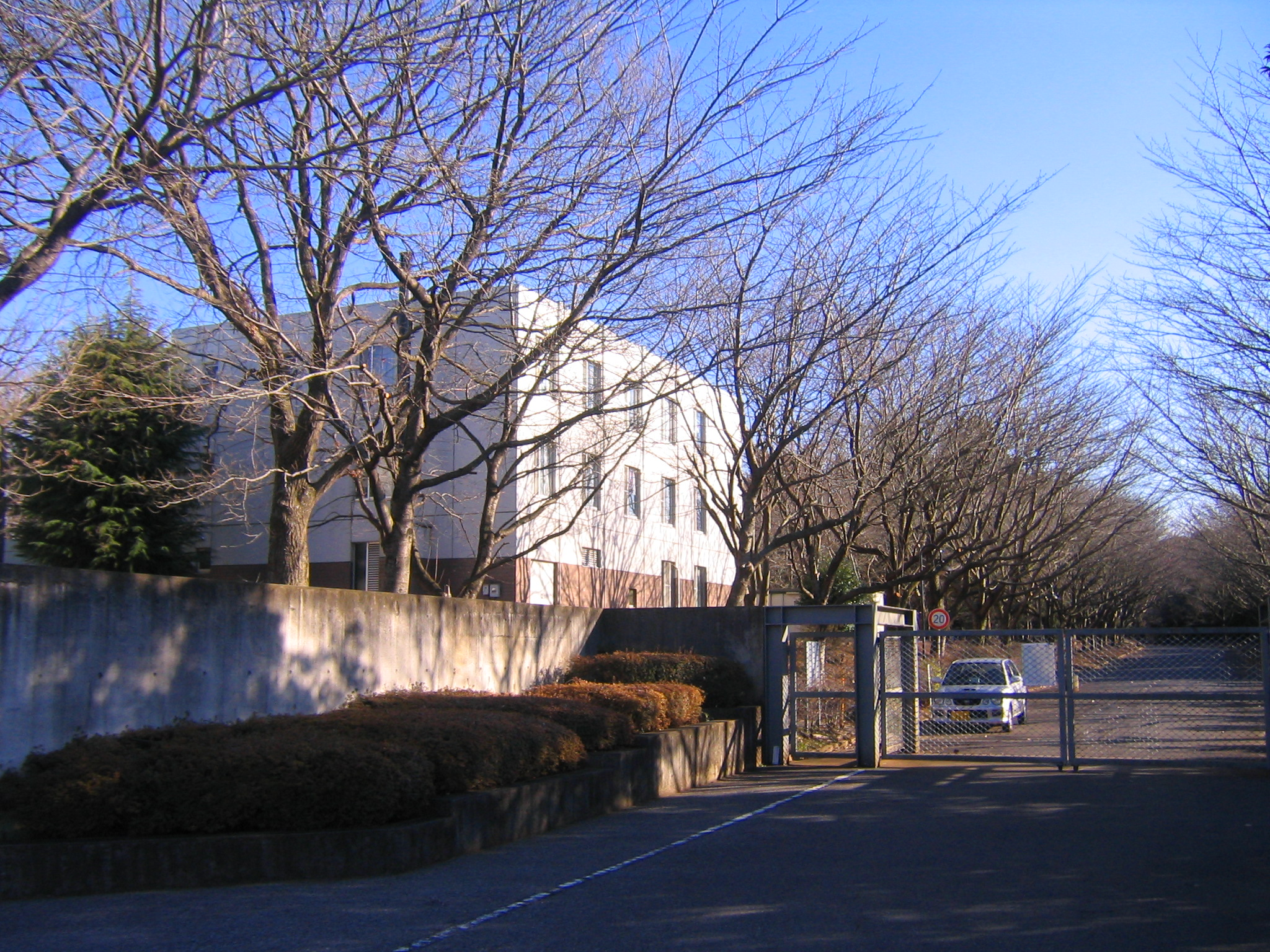
- Type: Private
- Established: 1966
- Location: Inzai, Chiba, Japan
- Website: Official website

Tokyo Christian University (東京基督教大学, Tōkyō kirisutokyō daigaku) is a private university in Inzai, Chiba, Japan, offering an undergraduate liberal arts degree in both Japanese and English. TCU is the only evangelical university fully accredited by the Japanese Ministry of Education, Culture, Sports, Science and Technology (MEXT).

== History ==
=== Tokyo ===
TCU's history spans 125 years of Japan's 140-year Protestant history. The university emerged from a merger of three Christian schools. The oldest, founded in 1881 in Yokohama, focused on women's education at a time when Japan offered women few opportunities for higher education. In 1949, the Tokyo Christian Theological Seminary came into existence, and in 1950, the Japan Domei Institute was established. The Domei Institute later offered both a three- and a four-year course, achieving accreditation as a junior college. In 1979, the three schools merged with the intention of upgrading the junior college into a university, while maintaining the seminary as a distinct graduate program with its own identity.

=== Chiba ===
In 1989, the merged school moved from Kunitachi in the West of Tokyo to its present location in Chiba New Town, a part of the greater Tokyo metropolitan area. Having achieved the approval of the Japanese Ministry of Education, the transition from the junior college to the university took place between 1990 and 1993. The university admitted its first group of students in 1990, when the junior college graduated its final class. In 1993, the university gained full recognition from the Japanese Ministry of Education, and it continues in this status until today. TCU is an accredited member of Asia Theological Association (ATA) and affiliated to Council for Christian Colleges & Universities (CCCU).
