= Kaoru Hasuike =

Japanese citizen (born 1957)

- 蓮池薫
- Born: September 29, 1957 (age 69); Kashiwazaki, Niigata Prefecture
- Education: Niigata University
- Occupations: University academic; translator
- Employer: Niigata Sangyo University
- Spouse: Okudo Yukiko
- Children: 2

Kaoru Hasuike (蓮池 薫, Hasuike Kaoru; born September 29, 1957) is a Japanese citizen who was abducted by North Korean spies along with his girlfriend Yukiko Okudo. They were abducted from their hometown of Kashiwazaki in Niigata prefecture on July 19, 1978. Hasuike was a law student at the time. During their captivity, in May 1980, Hasuike and Okudo were married. They had two children: a daughter, Shigeyo, and a son, Katsuya. On October 15, 2002, the North Korean government allowed Hasuike, Okudo and other victims to leave North Korea to visit Japan. Once there, Hasuike and Okudo decided to remain in Japan and to plead for the release of their children, which was eventually allowed in 2004.

After his escape, Hasuike wrote a book, Abduction and My Decision, about his experiences in North Korea.

In April 2013, Hasuike was appointed Associate Professor of economics at the Kashiwazaki-based Niigata Sangyo University, where he has taught Japanese and Korean languages since 2008. In addition, Hasuike runs a translation business.

His story and that of his brother Toru were adapted for a manga.

== See also ==
- North Korean abductions of Japanese citizens
