= North Korean abductions of Japanese citizens =

1977–1983 kidnapping cases

In May 2004, North Korea allowed the five children of two abducted couples to leave North Korea and join their families, who had come back to Japan a year and a half before.

Between 1977 and 1983, North Korean government agents abducted Japanese citizens from Japan. Although only 17 Japanese citizens (eight men and nine women) are officially recognized by the Japanese government as having been abducted, it is estimated that there may have been hundreds more. The Japanese National Police Agency lists 869 cases of missing persons in which the possibility of abduction by North Korea cannot be ruled out.

Many non-Japanese citizens, including eight citizens from European countries and one from the Middle East, have been abducted from Japan by North Korea.

== Background ==
In the 1970s, a number of Japanese citizens disappeared from coastal areas in Japan. The people who had disappeared were average Japanese people who were opportunistically abducted by operatives lying in wait. Although North Korean agents were suspected, the opinion that North Korea had nothing to do with the disappearances was widely held. Most of the missing were in their 20s; the youngest, Megumi Yokota, was 13 when she disappeared in November 1977, from the Japanese west coast city of Niigata.

Some of the victims were abducted to teach Japanese language and culture at North Korean spy schools. Older victims were also abducted for the purpose of obtaining their identities. It is speculated that Japanese women were abducted to have them become wives to a group of North Korea–based Japanese terrorists belonging to the Yodo-go terrorist group after a 1970 Japan Airlines hijacking and that some may have been abducted because they happened to witness activities of North Korean agents in Japan, which may explain Yokota's abduction at such a young age.

For a long time, these abductions were denied by North Korea and its sympathizers (including Chongryon and the Japan Socialist Party) and were often considered a conspiracy theory. Despite pressure from Japanese parent groups, the Japanese government took no action.

There are claims that this issue has been used by Japanese nationalists, including former Japanese Prime Ministers Yoshihide Suga and the late Shinzō Abe, to "further militarize", push for revision of the Constitution to reduce constitutional limits on the army, revise the Basic Education Law, and pursue other political goals. Such claims have been criticized by Kyoko Nakayama, the special adviser in Tokyo to the Japanese prime minister on the abduction issue, who said "This is about rescuing our citizens [from ongoing abduction] ... They deserve all possible support to regain their freedom and dignity. It is our duty to retrieve them." (See Norimitsu Onishi.)

== Talks between North Korea and Japan in 2002 and aftermath ==
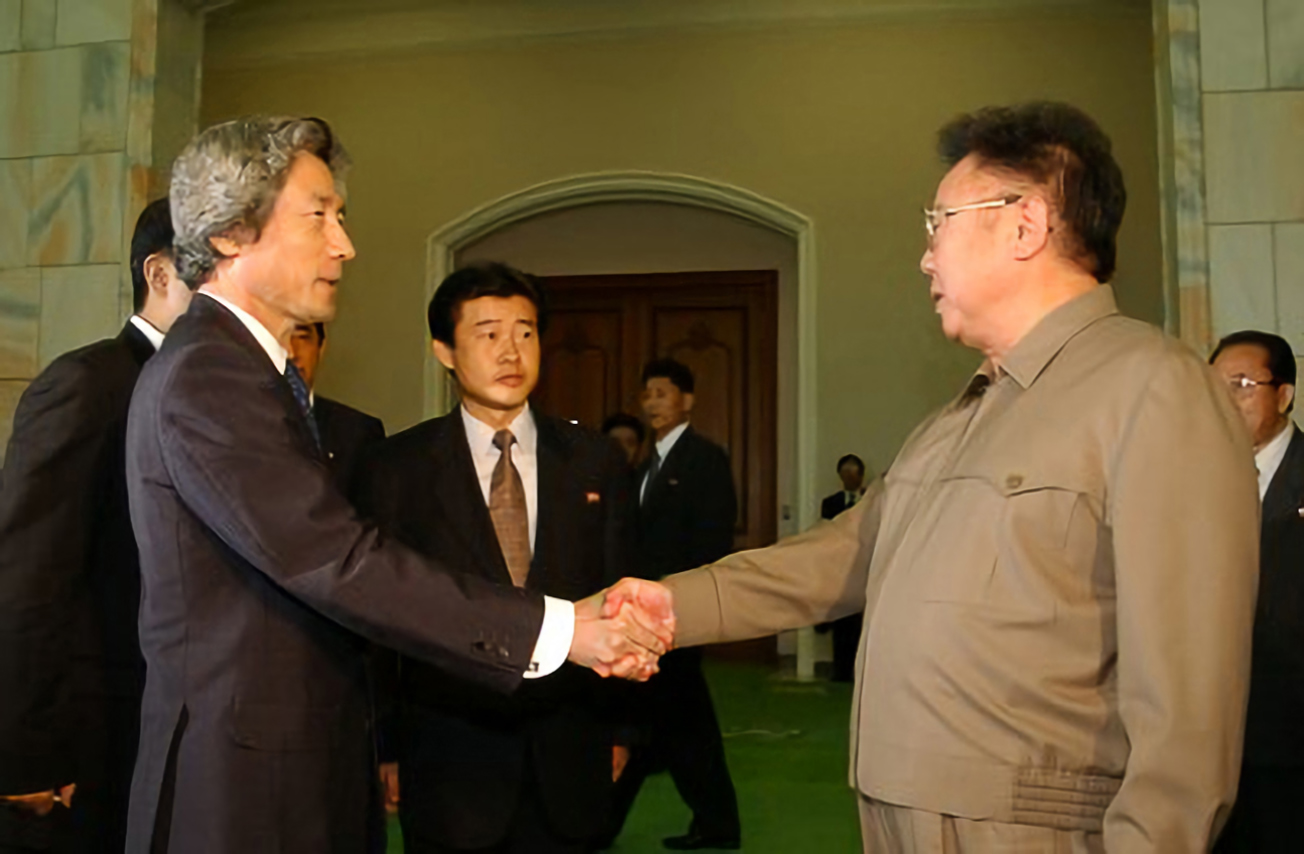
Junichiro Koizumi and Kim Jong Il

On September 17, 2002, then Japanese Prime Minister Junichiro Koizumi visited North Korea to meet North Korean leader Kim Jong Il for the First Japan–North Korea Summit. Before the summit began, Deputy Chief Cabinet Secretary Shinzo Abe, who was one of the members of the Diet most passionately dedicated to the abduction issue, advised Prime Minister Koizumi, "Absolutely do not show a smile." In the morning meeting, Abe judged that the North Korean side was not showing sincerity. Upon returning to the waiting room, he leveraged the high probability that the room was bugged by loudly stating, "Prime Minister, let's go home now." As the afternoon began, the North Korean side's attitude changed, and Kim Jong Il offered an apology, which allowed the meeting to immediately move forward and eventually resulted in the Japan–North Korea Pyongyang Declaration. To facilitate normalization of relations with Japan, Kim admitted North Korea had abducted at least 13 Japanese citizens and issued an oral apology:

"We have thoroughly investigated this matter. Decades of adversarial relations between our two countries provided the background of this incident. It was, nevertheless, an appalling incident. It is my understanding that this incident was initiated by special-mission organizations in the nineteen-seventies and eighties, driven by blindly motivated patriotism and misguided heroism.... As soon as their scheme and deeds were brought to my attention, those who were responsible were punished.... I would like to take this opportunity to apologize straightforwardly for the regrettable conduct of those people. I will not allow that to happen again."

— Kim Jong Il, apologizing for the abductions

During the meeting, North Korea also provided death certificates for eight people whom the North claimed were dead, but admitted in 2004 that these certificates had been hastily drafted shortly beforehand. For several reasons, the Japanese government and NGOs question whether or not those eight people are actually dead.

According to Russian scholar Andrei Lankov, the North Korean disclosure was a strategic mistake. What was intended to be a gesture of honesty was met with outrage within both the Japanese government and the general public, as the allegations that were previously thought of as conspiracy theories had proved to be true. Japan retaliated by trying to isolate North Korea by cutting trade and other exchanges. In Lankov's view, the North Korean government will "probably think twice" before making similar confessions in the future. The ordeal was also unnecessary because North Korea had ample supply of willing Japanese speakers through Chongryon.

=== Return of five victims ===
Later, North Korea allowed the five victims that it said were alive to return to Japan, on the condition that they return later to North Korea. The victims (whose identities were confirmed by DNA testing, dental records, and fingerprint analysis) were returned to Japan on October 15, 2002. The five repatriated victims were Fukie Chimura (née Hamamoto), Yasushi Chimura, Yukiko Hasuike (née Okudo), Kaoru Hasuike, and Hitomi Soga, the wife of Charles Robert Jenkins, who remained in North Korea. However, the Japanese Government, listening to the pleas of the general public and the abductees' families, told North Korea that the victims would not be returning. North Korea claimed that this was a violation of the agreement and refused to continue further talks.

=== Children/spouses of returned victims reunited ===
The three children of the Chimura family and the two children of the Hasuike family, who were born in North Korea, were allowed to rejoin their parents in Japan following the second visit of Japanese Prime Minister Koizumi to Pyongyang on May 22, 2004. They returned to Japan on July 18, 2004. According to their parents and other relatives, all five children expressed a desire to remain in Japan and live as Japanese citizens.

Hitomi Soga was able to reunite with her husband and children, but through a more circuitous route. Her husband, Charles Robert Jenkins, was a defector from the United States Army who fled to North Korea where he eventually met and married Soga. Fearing a court-martial, Jenkins and their two daughters initially met Soga in Jakarta, Indonesia, on July 9, 2004, eventually returning together to Japan on July 18. Two months later, on September 11, 2004, Jenkins reported to the army base at Camp Zama, Japan, served a light sentence after being found guilty of desertion and aiding the enemy, and was dishonorably discharged from the army. Charles then lived on Sado Island in Japan with his family until his death in 2017.

=== Further evidence and investigations ===
In November 2004, North Korea returned the cremated remains of two people, stating that they were those of Megumi Yokota and Kaoru Matsuki, who North Korea claimed died after being abducted. Subsequent Japanese DNA testing determined that those remains belonged to neither of the two. However, the independent scientific journal Nature published an article highly critical of this testing, which was performed at Teikyo University by Tomio Yoshii, a relatively junior faculty member (lecturer) in a forensics department, without a professor being present. Yoshii later acknowledged that he had no previous experience in the analysis of cremated specimens. This mistake—intentional or not—further strained relations between Japan and North Korea.

In an interview with Japanese police, Yasushi Chimura and Kaoru Hasuike, two of the abductees allowed to return to Japan in 2002, identified two of their abductors as Sin Gwang-su (known also as Sin Kwang-su) and a man known as "Pak". The National Police Agency has requested the arrests of Sin Gwang-su and Choi Sung-chol for the abductions of Japanese nationals. Sin reportedly told police in South Korea that he had been personally ordered by Kim Jong Il to carry out abductions.

In March 2006, Osaka police raided six facilities, including the North Korean Chamber of Commerce, in an investigation into the circumstances surrounding the June 1980 disappearance of one of the alleged abductees, Tadaaki Hara. All six facilities were linked to Chongryon, a pro-North Korean residents' organization in Japan. A police spokesman said that the head of Chongryon at the time was suspected of cooperating in his abduction.

=== Situation since 2004 ===
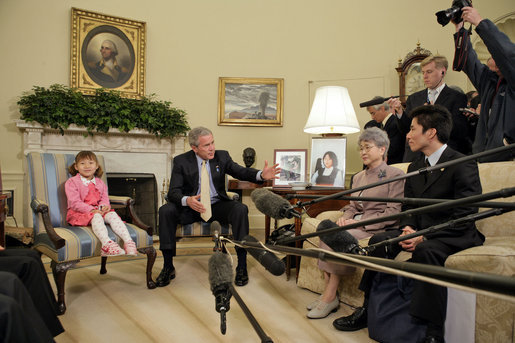
Sakie Yokota, the mother of the abducted girl Megumi Yokota, meets with U.S. President George W. Bush at the White House in April 2006.

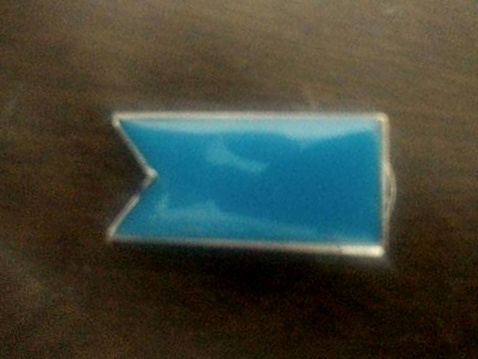
Badge worn in support of returning victims to Japan (often worn as a lapel pin [ja])

The North Korean government continues to claim that there were only 13 abductees and that the issue has been resolved with the return of the five victims. However, the Japanese government claims that the issue has not been properly resolved and that all evidence provided by North Korea is forged.

By May 2004, five abductee victims and their families (10 in total) returned from North Korea. However, a number of alleged victims are still missing. Although then Chief Cabinet Secretary Hiroyuki Hosoda commented on December 24, 2004, that "unless honest measures are taken swiftly, we cannot help but impose strict measures", hinting at possible sanctions.

The victims' support group has also looked to the United Nations (UN) for help. UN Secretary-General Kofi Annan, in a speech given in the Japanese Diet on February 24, 2004, mentioned the issue, sympathized with the victims and their families, and expressed wishes for a complete settlement. Later that year, the United States Congress passed the North Korean Human Rights Act of 2004. The victims' families and their supporters expressed gratitude toward the United States government and president.

In 2004, the Japanese Diet passed two laws designed to restrict trade with North Korea. On November 2, 2005, the United Kingdom led 45 countries, including the United States and Japan, in submitting a proposal condemning North Korea to the United Nations. On December 16, this proposal was passed by the UN General Assembly with 88 supporting, 21 opposing, and 60 abstention votes. In particular, China and Russia opposed this proposal and the South Korean government abstained. The proposal condemned North Korea for "systematic humanitarian violations" and mentioned the abduction issue, the existence of concentration camps and the abuse against North Korean defectors sent back to North Korea. United States Secretary of State Condoleezza Rice expressed support for the abduction issue. On April 27, 2006, Sakie Yokota, mother of abductee Megumi Yokota, testified in a United States House of Representatives subcommittee about the abduction issue. The next day, Yokota met with US President George W. Bush to ask for the United States' help in resolving the abduction issue. The President called the meeting "one of the most moving meetings" in his presidency and questioned North Korea's actions. On June 13, 2006, the North Korean Human Rights Bill, calling for sanctions to be placed on North Korea, was tabled in the Japanese Diet.

In October 2011, South Korean intelligence agencies reported they believed dozens of South Korean and Japanese abduction victims were moved to Wonhwa-ri in South Pyongan Province; this group may have included Megumi Yokota, Yaeko Taguchi, and Tadaaki Hara.

Following Kim Jong Il's death in December 2011, former abductee Kaoru Hasuike expressed a wish for the Japanese government to "carefully analyze the state of affairs in North Korea and do its best to secure the safety of abductees still left there". The abduction issue has become very central to Japan's North Korea policy and Japan's participation in the Six-Party Talks. Most importantly, "Tokyo has kept conditioning its provision of economic incentives, widely deemed to be crucial to a comprehensive and lasting solution of the nuclear conundrum, on the establishment of diplomatic relations with North Korea—a development which in turn hinges on a resolution of the abduction issue."

On August 29, 2013, families of victims including the Yokotas testified at a UN team hearing. In May 2014, after talks with Japan, North Korea agreed to probe the abductees issue. On 4 July 2014, Japan eased several of its sanctions on North Korea after talks between the two countries. Pyongyang agreed to reopen investigations about the abduction cases. In October 2014, a Japanese delegation visited North Korea.

In March 2015, after talks with North Korea failed to produce results, Japan extended its sanctions for another 24 months. These include barring North Korean ships from entering Japanese ports and limits on trade with the country. These sanctions have expired in March 2017.

In February 2019, it was announced by Japanese government sources that Minoru Tanaka, a restaurant worker believed to have been kidnapped in or around 1978, has been living in Pyongyang with his wife and children since then. North Korean authorities had previously denied any involvement with Tanaka's disappearance, and no immediate reaction was available.

Mainichi Shimbun reported in 2019 on May 20 that a man from Chiba that was listed as likely abducted by North Korea was found in Japan and no connections were made to North Korea involving his 1992 disappearance. The number of suspected Japanese citizens kidnapped by North Korea dropped to 882.

Japan Times reported on 7 August 2019 that a man listed as likely abducted by North Korea was found in Japan with his disappearance in 1974 having no connection to North Korea. The number of suspected kidnappings of Japanese citizens by North Korea dropped to 881 people. Tokyo Reporter reported on 8 September that Japanese police confirmed Takeshi Saito was dead and his body found in April 2018, the number of suspected kidnappings was lowered to 880. As of September 10, 2019, the National Police listed 879 Japanese citizens suspected of being kidnapped by North Korea, revised lower further to 871 on July 12, 2022

Following the resignation of long-serving prime minister Shinzō Abe in 2020 for health reasons, his replacement, Yoshihide Suga, claimed he wanted 'to make a breakthrough' regarding the situation, and went on to discuss the possibility of a meeting between himself and Kim Jong Un to discuss the issue. However, Suga resigned in 2021 before he could meet with Kim Jong Un, his successor, Fumio Kishida, did not comment on the abduction issue.

North Korean Foreign Minister Choe Son-hui restated Pyongyang's policy of rejecting any contact with Japan on March 29, 2024, and declared that holding discussions with Tokyo is of minimal importance to her country. Minister Choe criticized Japan's prime minister Fumio Kishida's announcement on March 28, 2024, that Japan would continue addressing issues regarding North Korea, including the abduction of Japanese nationals in the past.

== List of victims ==
Seventeen nationals are officially recognized by the Japanese government as victims of the abduction issue. The sixteenth, Minoru Tanaka, was added to the list on April 27, 2005, following discovery of evidence supporting the assertion that he was abducted. The seventeenth victim, Kyoko Matsumoto, was added to the list in November 2006.

Name	Sex	Born	Circumstances of disappearance	Current status
Yutaka Kume	Male	c. 1925	Disappeared September 19, 1977 from Noto Peninsula, Ishikawa Prefecture	North Korea denies any involvement.
Minoru Tanaka	Male	c. 1950	Disappeared in June 1978. Persuaded to go overseas, and later taken to North Korea.	North Korea denies any involvement, Japanese government announced in February 2019 that Tanaka is alive and living in Pyongyang.
Kyoko Matsumoto	Female	1948	Disappeared on October 21, 1977, on her way to a knitting class near her home	North Korea denies any involvement.
Keiko Arimoto	Female	January 12, 1960	Disappeared in June 1983 from Copenhagen, Denmark. She had previously been studying English in London.	Allegedly died on November 4, 1988, in North Korea. However, her parents still refuse to believe their daughter is dead until the North provides irrefutable evidence.
Megumi Yokota	Female	October 15, 1964	Disappeared November 15, 1977 from Niigata, Niigata Prefecture	Allegedly died on March 13, 1994, in North Korea (date was originally announced as 1993 but was later corrected by North Korea). However, her parents still refuse to believe their daughter is dead until the North provides irrefutable evidence.
Yaeko Taguchi	Female	August 10, 1955	Disappeared in June 1978 from Tokyo, Japan.	Allegedly died on July 30, 1986, in North Korea. However, Kim Hyon-hui, the surviving bomber of Korean Air Flight 858, denied North Korea's claim.
Yasushi Chimura	Male	June 4, 1955	Disappeared together on July 7, 1978, near coast of Obama, Fukui.	Alive (returned in 2002)
Fukie Hamamoto	Female	June 8, 1955	Disappeared together on July 7, 1978, near coast of Obama, Fukui.	Alive (returned in 2002)
Kaoru Hasuike	Male	September 29, 1957	Disappeared together on July 31, 1978, from the coast of Kashiwazaki, Niigata.	Alive (returned in 2002)
Yukiko Okudo	Female	April 15, 1956	Disappeared together on July 31, 1978, from the coast of Kashiwazaki, Niigata.	Alive (returned in 2002)
Hitomi Soga	Female	May 17, 1959	Disappeared together on August 12, 1978, from Sado Island, Niigata Prefecture	Alive (returned in 2002). Married Sergeant Charles Robert Jenkins, a 1965 deserter from the United States Army, in 1980, and returned to Japan with him in 2004.
Miyoshi Soga	Female	c. 1932	Disappeared together on August 12, 1978, from Sado Island, Niigata Prefecture	North Korea denies any involvement. However, Hitomi Soga, Miyoshi's daughter, denied North Korea's claim.
Rumiko Masumoto	Female	November 1, 1954	Disappeared together on August 12, 1978, from Fukiage, Kagoshima Prefecture	Allegedly died on August 17, 1981, in North Korea
Shuichi Ichikawa	Male	October 20, 1954	Disappeared together on August 12, 1978, from Fukiage, Kagoshima Prefecture	Allegedly died on September 4, 1979, in North Korea
Toru Ishioka	Male	June 29, 1957	Disappeared in May 1980 from Madrid, Spain during a trip in Europe	Allegedly died on November 4, 1988, in North Korea
Kaoru Matsuki	Male	June 23, 1953	Disappeared in May 1980 from Madrid, Spain during a trip in Europe	Allegedly died on August 23, 1996, in North Korea
Tadaaki Hara	Male	August 10, 1936	Disappeared in June 1980 from Miyazaki, Miyazaki Prefecture	Allegedly died on July 19, 1986, in North Korea

== Other abductions by North Korea ==
North Korea has also perpetrated abductions in South Korea, which has the highest number of citizens abducted by the North. The number of South Korean abductees is put at 3,800 in total, with an estimated 485 or 486 abductees still in North Korean captivity.

In December 1969, a Korean Air Lines YS-11 was hijacked by a North Korean agent soon after taking off from Gangneung. The pilot was forced to fly to and land in North Korea. The crew, aircraft, and seven of the passengers have yet to be returned. North Korea claims that this was an act of asylum by the pilot, but it is considered to be another case of abduction.

In the 1970s, many women were abducted from Lebanon and in July 1977 there was an attempt to abduct a Korean pianist/actress and her husband from Yugoslavia. Aleida "Leidy" Kaspersma, who was Dutch national, mysteriously vanished from Kenmare in 1978 after possibly being kidnapped.

There are testimonies that several others have been abducted, including two Chinese (Macau), two Dutch, three French, three Italians, a Jordanian, four Malaysians, and a Singaporean. There is also some evidence that suggests that a missing American citizen, David Sneddon, was kidnapped while traveling in China in 2004 by North Korean agents and brought to somewhere just outside Pyongyang to be the personal English language tutor for Kim Jong Un.

The UN Commission on Human Rights investigated the abductees issue, as part of the Commission of Inquiry on Human Rights in the Democratic People's Republic of Korea. Abductee Hitomi Soga has also testified that citizens of Romania and Thailand were among the abductees. The family of an abduction victim from Thailand has been identified and the Japanese government is working with the Thai government to resolve the issue.

According to the Committee for Democratization of North Korea (CDNK), North Korean agents are also believed to have abducted roughly 200 citizens of the People's Republic of China from the late 1990s onward, mostly ethnic Koreans from frontier towns in northeast China who provided aid to North Korean defectors. The kidnapped victims were then imprisoned in North Korea. The Chinese government reportedly has not officially requested the repatriation of any of these victims, a policy the CDNK describes as aimed at preserving harmony in the countries' bilateral relations.

== Controversies ==
There is controversy about whether the remains of Megumi Yokota returned by North Korea to Japan are genuine or not. The Japanese government tested them and claims they are not. But in February 2005, the British scientific journal Nature published an article in which the Teikyo University DNA analyst who did the tests, Tomio Yoshii, acknowledged that the results could be inconclusive. Likewise, the technique used is reportedly no longer used professionally in the United States due to the ease with which contamination can occur. According to the Japanese Foreign Ministry, the remains are not available for further testing.

Another controversy arose when, in May 2012, Japan strongly protested when a top American diplomat linked the issue of North Korean abductions of Japanese citizens with the issue of abduction to Japan by Japanese parents away from non-Japanese parents.

== In fiction ==
The protagonist of the novel The Orphan Master's Son spends several years during the early part of the book helping with and organizing abductions of Japanese citizens to North Korea. These abductions and some of their victims remain an important secondary theme for the rest of the book.

The novel Flashlight by Susan Choi also explores this concept.

== See also ==
- Abduction: The Megumi Yokota Story – 2006 American documentary
- Human rights in North Korea
- Japan–North Korea relations
- Japanese people in North Korea
- Kim Hyon-hui – South Korean citizen and former North Korean agent (born 1962)
- Korean War POWs detained in North Korea
- List of kidnappings
- Lists of people who disappeared – Lists of people of unknown locations and status
- Megumi Yokota – Japanese citizen kidnapped by North Korea (born 1964)
- North Korean abductions of South Koreans
